= 2017 Sydney Swans season =

Sydney Swans
2017 season
- President: Andrew Pridham
- Coach: John Longmire (7th season)
- Captains: Josh Kennedy (1st season)
- Home grounds: SCG (capacity: 48,000)
- AFL season: 6th (14–8)
- Finals: 5th (defeated by Geelong in Semi-Final)
- Bob Skilton Medal: Luke Parker
- Leading goalkicker: Lance Franklin (73)
- Highest home attendance: 46,323 (Elimination Final vs Essendon)
- Lowest home attendance: 20,692 (Round 12 vs Western Bulldogs)
- Average home attendance: 34,475 (▼5,955)
- Club membership: 58,838 (▲2,315)

The 2017 AFL season was the 121st season in the Australian Football League contested by the Sydney Swans. The team's reserve side also participated in the 2017 NEAFL season. Sydney made the finals after losing their first six matches, the only team to do so under the AFL final eight system.

== Squad for 2017 ==
Statistics are correct as of end of 2016 season. Flags represent the state of origin, i.e. the state in which the player played his under 18 football.

Senior list
No.	State	Player	Hgt (cm)	Wgt (kg)	Date of birth	Age (end 2017)	AFL debut	Recruited from	Games (end 2016)	Goals (end 2016)
1	(South Australia)	James Rose	185	85	16 April 1996	21	2015	Sturt	7	5
2	(Victoria (state))	Alex Johnson	193	91	2 March 1992	25	2011	Oakleigh (U18)	45	1
3	(New South Wales)	Jarrad McVeigh (lg)	184	82	7 April 1985	32	2004	NSW/ACT (U18)	287	192
4	(Victoria (state))	Dan Hannebery (vc)	181	76	24 February 1991	26	2009	Oakleigh (U18)	170	82
5	(New South Wales)	Isaac Heeney	185	85	5 May 1996	21	2015	Cardiff, Sydney Swans Academy	38	44
6	(New South Wales)	Jordan Foote	183	82	2 January 1996	21	2016	UNSW-Eastern Suburbs, Sydney Swans Academy	1	0
7	(New South Wales)	Harry Cunningham	181	77	6 December 1993	24	2012	NSW/ACT (U18)	70	36
8	(Queensland)	Kurt Tippett	202	105	8 May 1987	30	2008	Southport, Adelaide	169	318
9	(South Australia)	Will Hayward	185	75	26 October 1998	19		North Adelaide
10	(Victoria (state))	Zak Jones	181	79	15 March 1995	22	2014	Dandenong (U18)	31	4
11	(Victoria (state))	Jeremy Laidler	190	91	5 August 1989	28	2009	Calder (U18), Geelong, Carlton	84	7
12	(Victoria (state))	Josh Kennedy (c)	188	94	20 June 1988	29	2008	Sandringham (U18), Hawthorn	183	115
13	(Victoria (state))	Oliver Florent	183	74	22 July 1998	19		Sandringham (U18)
14	(New South Wales)	Callum Mills	188	83	2 April 1997	20	2016	North Shore, Sydney Swans Academy	22	1
15	(New South Wales)	Kieren Jack (lg)	177	77	28 June 1987	30	2007	NSW/ACT (U18)	210	144
16	(Victoria (state))	Gary Rohan	189	91	7 June 1991	26	2010	Geelong (U18)	79	67
17	(Western Australia)	Darcy Cameron	203	101	18 July 1995	22		Claremont
18	(Western Australia)	Callum Sinclair	199	102	23 September 1989	28	2013	Subiaco, West Coast	45	28
20	(Victoria (state))	Sam Reid	196	97	27 December 1991	26	2010	Murray (U18)	98	94
21	(Victoria (state))	Jack Maibaum	192	92	27 March 1998	19		Eastern (U18)
22	(Victoria (state))	Dean Towers	188	86	4 May 1990	27	2014	North Ballarat	30	18
23	(Western Australia)	Lance Franklin	199	106	30 January 1987	30	2005	Perth, Hawthorn	247	787
24	(New South Wales)	Dane Rampe (vc)	188	88	2 June 1990	27	2013	UNSW-Eastern	98	6
26	(Victoria (state))	Luke Parker (vc)	182	85	25 October 1992	25	2011	Dandenong (U18)	127	103
27	(New South Wales)	Daniel Robinson	184	85	3 July 1994	23	2015	Mosman Football Club	11	3
28	(Victoria (state))	Nic Newman	187	82	15 January 1993	24		Frankston
29	(South Australia)	George Hewett	187	81	29 December 1995	22	2016	North Adelaide	24	18
30	(Victoria (state))	Tyrone Leonardis	182	84	22 February 1997	20		Northern (U18)
31	(Western Australia)	Harrison Marsh	188	86	13 January 1994	23	2016	East Fremantle	7	0
32	(Victoria (state))	Michael Talia	192	94	11 February 1993	24	2012	Calder (U18), Western Bulldogs	31	3
33	(New South Wales)	Brandon Jack	182	81	25 May 1994	23	2013	Pennant Hills	27	16
34	(South Australia)	Jordan Dawson	190	84	9 April 1997	20		Sturt
35	(New South Wales)	Sam Naismith	206	105	16 July 1992	25	2014	North Shore	13	3
36	(Western Australia)	Aliir Aliir	194	95	5 September 1994	23	2016	East Fremantle	13	0
39	(South Australia)	Heath Grundy (lg)	192	105	2 June 1986	31	2006	Norwood	213	23
40	(Victoria (state))	Nick Smith (lg)	183	81	12 June 1988	29	2008	Oakleigh (U18)	167	10
41	(Victoria (state))	Tom Papley	177	77	13 July 1996	21	2016	Gippsland (U18)	20	29
44	(Victoria (state))	Jake Lloyd	180	77	20 September 1993	24	2014	North Ballarat (U18)	69	17
Rookie list
No.	State	Player	Hgt	Wgt	Date of birth	Age	Debut	Recruited from	Games	Goals
19	(Northern Territory)	Shaun Edwards	190	85	13 December 1993	24	2012	St Mary's (NTFL), Essendon	24	10
25	(Victoria (state))	Ben Ronke	181	73	18 December 1997	20		Calder (U18)
38	(Republic of Ireland)	Colin O'Riordan	186	86	12 October 1995	22		Tipperary GAA
42	(Victoria (state))	Robbie Fox	185	84	16 April 1993	24		Coburg VFL
43	(Victoria (state))	Lewis Melican	193	95	4 November 1996	21		Geelong U18
45	(New South Wales)	Sam Fisher	181	78	23 February 1998	19		Canberra
46	(Victoria (state))	Sam Murray	187	88	2 September 1997	20		Wodonga
47	(South Australia)	Toby Pink	193	85	11 August 1998	19		Glenelg
Senior coaching panel
	State	Coach	Coaching position				Sydney coaching debut	Former clubs as coach
	(New South Wales)	John Longmire	Senior coach				2002
	(South Australia)	Stuart Dew	Senior assistant coach (midfield)				2009
	(South Australia)	Josh Francou	Assistant coach (stoppages)				2015
	(New South Wales)	Brett Kirk	Assistant coach (forwards)				2016	Fremantle (a)
	(Victoria (state))	Henry Playfair	Assistant coach (defence)				2010	Sydney Swans (NEAFL) (s)
	(Victoria (state))	John Blakey	Coaching director/head of development				2006	Brisbane Lions (a)
	(Victoria (state))	Nick Davis	Development coach				2016
	(Victoria (state))	Rhyce Shaw	Reserves coach				2016
	(South Australia)	Jared Crouch	Academy coaching director				2011

- For players: (c) denotes captain, (vc) denotes vice-captain, (lg) denotes leadership group.
- For coaches: (s) denotes senior coach, (cs) denotes caretaker senior coach, (a) denotes assistant coach, (d) denotes development coach.

== Playing list changes ==
The following summarises all player changes between the conclusion of the 2015 season and the beginning of the 2016 season.

=== In ===
Player	Previous club	League	via
(Victoria (state)) Oliver Florent	Sandringham Dragons	TAC Cup	Pick 11, 2016 National Draft
(South Australia) Will Hayward	North Adelaide	SANFL	Pick 21, 2016 National Draft
(Victoria (state)) Jack Maibaum	Eastern Ranges	TAC Cup	Pick 45, 2016 National Draft
(Western Australia) Darcy Cameron	Claremont	WAFL	Pick 48, 2016 National Draft
(Victoria (state)) Ben Ronke	Calder Cannons	TAC Cup	Pick 17, 2017 Rookie Draft
(Victoria (state)) Robbie Fox	Coburg Lions	VFL	Pick 34, 2017 Rookie Draft
(Northern Territory) Shaun Edwards	Essendon	AFL	Pick 49, 2017 Rookie Draft
(South Australia) Toby Pink	Glenelg	SANFL	Pick 54, 2017 Rookie Draft
(New South Wales) Sam Fisher	Canberra	NEAFL	Category-B Rookie

=== Out ===
Player	New club	League	via
(Western Australia) Tom Mitchell	Hawthorn	AFL	Trade
(Tasmania) Toby Nankervis	Richmond	AFL	Trade
(Victoria (state)) Ted Richards			Retired
(Victoria (state)) Ben McGlynn			Retired
(Victoria (state)) Tom Derickx			Retired
(New South Wales) Abe Davis			Delisted
(New South Wales) Kyle Galloway			Delisted
(New South Wales) Jack Hiscox			Delisted
(Victoria (state)) Xavier Richards	Sydney University	NEAFL	Delisted

=== List management ===
Player	Change
(Victoria (state)) Tom Papley	Promoted from the rookie list to the senior list
(Western Australia) Harrison Marsh	Promoted from the rookie list to the senior list
(New South Wales) Jordan Foote	Promoted from the rookie list to the senior list
(Victoria (state)) Nic Newman	Promoted from the rookie list to the senior list

== Season summary ==
=== Pre-season matches ===
**Rd**	**Date and local time**	**Opponent**	**Scores** (Sydney's scores indicated in **bold**)			**Venue**	**Attendance**
**Rd**	**Date and local time**	**Opponent**	Home	Away	Result	**Venue**	**Attendance**
1	Sunday, 19 February	North Melbourne	**0.8.15 (63)**	0.9.11 (65)	Lost by 2 points	Coffs Harbour International Stadium (H)	3,040
2	Friday, 3 March (7:40 pm)	Greater Western Sydney	1.4.9 (42)	**0.8.6 (54)**	Won by 12 points	Blacktown International Sportspark (A)	2,695
3	Sunday, 12 March (7:10 pm)	St Kilda	0.10.14 (74)	**0.11.11 (77)**	Won by 3 points	Lavington Sports Ground (A)	6,893

=== Home and away season ===
**Rd**	**Date and local time**	**Opponent**	**Scores** (Sydney's scores indicated in **bold**)			**Venue**	**Attendance**	**Ladder** **position**	**Record**	**Ref.**
**Rd**	**Date and local time**	**Opponent**	Home	Away	Result	**Venue**	**Attendance**	**Ladder** **position**	**Record**	**Ref.**
1	Saturday, 25 March (4:35 pm)	Port Adelaide	**12.10 (82)**	17.8 (110)	Lost by 28 points	Sydney Cricket Ground (H)	33,129	14th	0–1	
2	Friday, 31 March (7:50 pm)	Western Bulldogs	16.14 (110)	**13.9 (87)**	Lost by 23 points	Etihad Stadium (A)	42,834	15th	0–2	
3	Friday, 7 April (7:50 pm)	Collingwood	**11.13 (79)**	11.14 (80)	Lost by 1 point	Sydney Cricket Ground (H)	35,310	16th	0–3	
4	Thursday, 13 April (6:10 pm)	West Coast	13.13 (91)	**10.5 (65)**	Lost by 26 points	Domain Stadium (A)	38,065	16th	0–4	
5	Saturday, 22 April (7:25 pm)	Greater Western Sydney	**9.9 (63)**	15.15 (105)	Lost by 42 points	Sydney Cricket Ground (H)	34,824	18th	0–5	
6	Saturday, 29 April (2:10 pm)	Carlton	15.7 (97)	**11.12 (78)**	Lost by 19 points	Melbourne Cricket Ground (A)	32,678	18th	0–6	
7	Sunday, 7 May (1:10 pm)	Brisbane Lions	**20.15 (135)**	12.9 (81)	Won by 54 points	Sydney Cricket Ground (H)	25,619	17th	1–6	
8	Sunday, 14 May (4:40 pm)	North Melbourne	11.12 (78)	**18.12 (120)**	Won by 42 points	Etihad Stadium (A)	21,589	15th	2–6	
9	Saturday, 20 May (1:45 pm)	St Kilda	10.8 (68)	**18.10 (118)**	Won by 50 points	Etihad Stadium (A)	29,778	12th	3–6	
10	Friday, 26 May (7:50 pm)	Hawthorn	**11.9 (75)**	12.9 (81)	Lost by 6 points	Sydney Cricket Ground (H)	36,221	15th	3–7	
11	Bye							16th	3–7	
12	Thursday, 8 June (7:20 pm)	Western Bulldogs	**12.16 (88)**	6.6 (42)	Won by 46 points	Sydney Cricket Ground (H)	20,692	14th	4–7	
13	Saturday, 17 June (1:45 pm)	Richmond	10.11 (71)	**12.8 (80)**	Won by 9 points	Melbourne Cricket Ground (A)	58,721	12th	5–7	
14	Friday, 23 June (7:50 pm)	Essendon	**11.20 (86)**	12.13 (85)	Won by 1 point	Sydney Cricket Ground (H)	34,575	10th	6–7	
15	Friday, 30 June (7:50 pm)	Melbourne	7.8 (50)	**11.19 (85)**	Won by 35 points	Melbourne Cricket Ground (A)	47,464	9th	7–7	
16	Saturday, 8 July (4:35 pm)	Gold Coast	**17.16 (118)**	7.9 (51)	Won by 67 points	Sydney Cricket Ground (H)	32,987	**8th**	8–7	
17	Saturday, 15 July (7:25 pm)	Greater Western Sydney	12.11 (83)	**14.12 (96)**	Won by 13 points	Spotless Stadium (A)	21,924	**6th**	9–7	
18	Saturday, 22 July (7:25 pm)	St Kilda	**14.17 (101)**	9.5 (59)	Won by 42 points	Sydney Cricket Ground (H)	35,773	**6th**	10–7	
19	Friday, 28 July (7:50 pm)	Hawthorn	10.12 (72)	**9.12 (66)**	Lost by 6 points	Melbourne Cricket Ground (A)	52,181	**6th**	10–8	
20	Friday, 4 August (7:50 pm)	Geelong	8.13 (61)	**16.11 (107)**	Won by 46 points	Simonds Stadium (A)	30,833	**6th**	11–8	
21	Saturday, 12 August (1:45 pm)	Fremantle	**22.11 (143)**	5.9 (39)	Won by 104 points	Sydney Cricket Ground (H)	39,281	**5th**	12–8	
22	Friday, 18 August (7:20 pm)	Adelaide	11.14 (80)	**13.5 (83)**	Won by 3 points	Adelaide Oval (A)	51,466	**6th**	13–8	
23	Saturday, 26 August (4:35 pm)	Carlton	**21.12 (138)**	8.9 (57)	Won by 81 points	Sydney Cricket Ground (H)	38,965	**6th**	14–8	

=== Finals matches ===
**Round**	**Date and local time**	**Opponent**	**Scores** (Sydney's scores indicated in **bold**)			**Venue**	**Attendance**	**Ref**
**Round**	**Date and local time**	**Opponent**	Home	Away	Result	**Venue**	**Attendance**	**Ref**
EF	Saturday, 9 September (4:20 pm)	Essendon	**19.7 (121)**	8.8 (56)	Won by 65 points	Sydney Cricket Ground (H)	46,323	
SF	Friday, 15 September (7:50 pm)	Geelong	15.8 (98)	**5.9 (39)**	Lost by 59 points	Melbourne Cricket Ground (A)	55,529	

== Ladder ==
Pos	Team	Pld	W	L	D	PF	PA	PP	Pts	Qualification
1	Adelaide	22	15	6	1	2415	1776	136.0	62	2017 finals
2	Geelong	22	15	6	1	2134	1818	117.4	62	2017 finals
3	Richmond (P)	22	15	7	0	1992	1684	118.3	60	2017 finals
4	Greater Western Sydney	22	14	6	2	2081	1812	114.8	60	2017 finals
5	Port Adelaide	22	14	8	0	2168	1671	129.7	56	2017 finals
6	Sydney	22	14	8	0	2093	1651	126.8	56	2017 finals
7	Essendon	22	12	10	0	2135	2004	106.5	48	2017 finals
8	West Coast	22	12	10	0	1964	1858	105.7	48	2017 finals
9	Melbourne	22	12	10	0	2035	1934	105.2	48	
10	Western Bulldogs	22	11	11	0	1857	1913	97.1	44	
11	St Kilda	22	11	11	0	1925	1986	96.9	44	
12	Hawthorn	22	10	11	1	1864	2055	90.7	42	
13	Collingwood	22	9	12	1	1944	1963	99.0	38	
14	Fremantle	22	8	14	0	1607	2160	74.4	32	
15	North Melbourne	22	6	16	0	1983	2264	87.6	24	
16	Carlton	22	6	16	0	1594	2038	78.2	24	
17	Gold Coast	22	6	16	0	1756	2311	76.0	24	
18	Brisbane Lions	22	5	17	0	1877	2526	74.3	20	

Source: AFL
Rules for classification: 1) points; 2) percentage; 3) number of points for.
(P) Premiers

== Awards and records ==
=== VFL/AFL records ===
The Swans became the first team ever to make the finals after starting 0-6.

=== Bob Skilton Medal ===
The Bob Skilton Medal is an annual award presented to the club's best and fairest player throughout the season. It was given to Luke Parker for the 2017 season.

Bob Skilton Medal
Rank	Player	Votes
1	Luke Parker	696
2e	Lance Franklin	650
2e	Jake Lloyd	650
4	Josh Kennedy	580
5	George Hewett	571
6	Heath Grundy	569
7	Tom Papley	556
8	Dan Hannebery	546
9	Zak Jones	543
10	Isaac Heeney	518

Rising Star Award: Lewis Melican

Dennis Carroll Trophy for Most Improved Player: George Hewett

Barry Round Shield for Best Clubman: Callum Sinclair

Paul Kelly Players’ Player: Josh Kennedy

Paul Roos Award for Best Player in a Finals Series: Heath Grundy & Kieren Jack

=== All-Australian Team ===
The 2017 All-Australian team included two Swans players in the initial 40-man squad, before naming just Lance Franklin in the final team.

All-Australian Team
No.	State	Player	Status	Position
23	(Western Australia)	Lance Franklin	In Team	Centre-half forward

=== Milestones ===
Milestones
No.	State	Player	Milestone	Round
20	(Victoria (state))	Sam Reid	100th career game	Round 2
23	(Western Australia)	Lance Franklin	250th career game	Round 3
23	(Western Australia)	Lance Franklin	800th career goal	Round 5
18	(Western Australia)	Callum Sinclair	50th career game	Round 7
24	(New South Wales)	Dane Rampe	100th career game	Round 9
5	(New South Wales)	Isaac Heeney	50th career game	Round 17
12	(Victoria (state))	Josh Kennedy	200th career game	Round 19
10	(Victoria (state))	Zak Jones	50th career game	Round 21
26	(Victoria (state))	Luke Parker	150th career game	Elimination Final
3	(New South Wales)	Jarrad McVeigh	300th career game	Semi-final

=== Debuts ===
Debuts
No.	State	Player	Round
13	(Victoria (state))	Oliver Florent	Round 1
9	(South Australia)	Will Hayward	Round 2
28	(Victoria (state))	Nic Newman	Round 2
42	(Victoria (state))	Robbie Fox	Round 2
34	(South Australia)	Jordan Dawson	Round 3
43	(South Australia)	Lewis Melican	Round 5

^{1}Had previously played for another club but played their first match for the Sydney Swans.

=== AFL Rising Star ===
Each round during the season a different eligible player is nominated for the annual award of AFL Rising Star, with a panel of experts voting on the nominated players at the end of the year. In 2017 two Swans players received nominations for the award.

AFL Rising Star
No.	State	Player	Status	Round
43	(South Australia)	Lewis Melican	Nominated	Round 18
9	(South Australia)	Will Hayward	Nominated	Round 23

=== 22 Under 22 Team ===
The 22 Under 22 team is a selection of the best team of AFL players under the age of 22, as selected by fans in an online poll. Three Swans players were selected for the team in 2017.

22 Under 22 team
No.	State	Player	Status
14	(New South Wales)	Callum Mills	Back pocket
41	(Victoria (state))	Tom Papley	Forward pocket
5	(New South Wales)	Isaac Heeney	Interchange

== Reserves ==
=== Regular season ===
**Rd**	**Date and local time**	**Opponent**	**Scores** (Sydney's scores indicated in **bold**)			**Venue**	**Ladder** **position**
**Rd**	**Date and local time**	**Opponent**	Home	Away	Result	**Venue**	**Ladder** **position**
1	Saturday, 1 April (1:30 pm)	Brisbane	17.9 (111)	**12.13 (85)**	Lost by 26 points	Blacktown International Sportspark (A)	8th
2	Saturday, 8 April (1:30 pm)	Southport	**20.9 (129)**	3.9 (27)	Won by 102 points	Blacktown International Sportspark (H)	**3rd**
3	Bye						**5th**
4	Saturday, 22 April (3:45 pm)	UWS Giants	**13.13 (91)**	8.7 (55)	Won by 36 points	Sydney Cricket Ground (H)	**3rd**
5	Friday, 28 April (7:30 pm)	NT Thunder	13.6 (84)	**16.12 (108)**	Won by 24 points	Marrara Oval (A)	**3rd**
6	Sunday, 7 May (9:30 am)	Brisbane	**15.12 (102)**	10.5 (65)	Won by 37 points	Sydney Cricket Ground (H)	**2nd**
7	Saturday, 13 May (12:00 pm)	Canberra	6.8 (44)	**25.15 (165)**	Won by 121 points	UNSW Canberra Oval (A)	**2nd**
8	Friday, 19 May (7:00 pm)	Sydney University	6.10 (46)	**16.17 (113)**	Won by 67 points	Henson Park (A)	**1st**
9	Saturday, 27 May (12:00 pm)	Gold Coast	**16.24 (120)**	4.8 (32)	Won by 88 points	Newcastle Oval (H)	**1st**
10	Bye						**2nd**
11	Saturday, 10 June (11:00 am)	UWS Giants	**28.17 (185)**	2.2 (14)	Won by 171 points	Blacktown International Sportspark (H)	**1st**
12	Saturday, 17 June (12:00 pm)	Aspley	8.4 (52)	**22.22 (154)**	Won by 102 points	South Pine Sports Complex (A)	**1st**
13	Friday, 23 June (4:10 pm)	Sydney University	9.10 (64)	**15.16 (106)**	Won by 42 points	Sydney Cricket Ground (A)	**1st**
14	Saturday, 1 July (12:00 pm)	Canberra	7.5 (47)	**20.18 (138)**	Won by 91 points	UNSW Canberra Oval (A)	**1st**
15	Saturday, 8 July (12:55 pm)	Gold Coast	**21.10 (136)**	4.5 (29)	Won by 107 points	Sydney Cricket Ground (H)	**1st**
16	Saturday, 15 July (3:45 pm)	UWS Giants	8.5 (53)	**16.16 (112)**	Won by 59 points	Spotless Stadium (A)	**1st**
17	Saturday, 22 July (3:45 pm)	NT Thunder	**21.21 (147)**	4.4 (28)	Won by 119 points	Sydney Cricket Ground (H)	**1st**
18	Bye						**1st**
19	Saturday, 5 August (12:45 pm)	Brisbane	19.14 (128)	**15.19 (109)**	Lost by 19 points	The Gabba (A)	**1st**
20	Saturday, 12 August (10:05 pm)	Redland	**26.17 (173)**	6.10 (46)	Won by 127 points	Sydney Cricket Ground (H)	**1st**

=== Finals series ===
**Rd**	**Date and local time**	**Opponent**	**Scores** (Sydney's scores indicated in **bold**)			**Venue**
**Rd**	**Date and local time**	**Opponent**	Home	Away	Result	**Venue**
EF	Bye					
SF	Saturday, 2 September (11:00 am)	Gold Coast	**21.16 (142)**	11.8 (74)	Won by 68 points	Blacktown International Sportspark (H)
GF	Saturday, 9 September (7:45 pm)	Brisbane	**10.22 (82)**	12.13 (85)	Lost by 3 points	Sydney Cricket Ground (H)
