= 2018 Sydney Swans season =

Sydney Swans
2018 season
- President: Andrew Pridham
- Coach: John Longmire (8th season)
- Captains: Josh Kennedy (2nd season)
- Home ground: SCG (capacity: 48,000)

The 2018 AFL season was the 122nd season in the Australian Football League contested by the Sydney Swans.

== Squad for 2018 ==
Statistics are correct as of end of 2016 season. Flags represent the state of origin, i.e. the state in which the player played his under 18 football.

Senior list
No.	State	Player	Hgt (cm)	Wgt (kg)	Date of birth	Age (end 2018)	AFL debut	Recruited from	Games (end 2017)	Goals (end 2017)
1	(South Australia)	James Rose	186	79	16 April 1996	22	2015	Sturt	8	5
3	(New South Wales)	Jarrad McVeigh	184	84	7 April 1985	33	2004	NSW/ACT (U18)	300	199
4	(Victoria (state))	Dan Hannebery	181	79	24 February 1991	27	2009	Oakleigh (U18)	193	94
5	(New South Wales)	Isaac Heeney	186	85	5 May 1996	22	2015	Cardiff, Sydney Swans Academy	58	60
6	(New South Wales)	Jordan Foote	184	81	2 January 1996	22	2016	UNSW-Eastern Suburbs, Sydney Swans Academy	6	1
7	(New South Wales)	Harry Cunningham	182	77	6 December 1993	25	2012	NSW/ACT (U18)	81	41
9	(South Australia)	Will Hayward	186	80	26 October 1998	20	2017	North Adelaide	17	22
10	(Victoria (state))	Zak Jones	181	78	15 March 1995	23	2014	Dandenong (U18)	54	14
11	(Victoria (state))	Tom Papley	177	77	13 July 1996	22	2016	Gippsland (U18)	40	59
12	(Victoria (state))	Josh Kennedy (c)	190	95	20 June 1988	29	2008	Sandringham (U18), Hawthorn	204	131
13	(Victoria (state))	Oliver Florent	183	80	22 July 1998	20	2017	Sandringham (U18)	9	4
14	(New South Wales)	Callum Mills	188	82	2 April 1997	21	2016	North Shore, Sydney Swans Academy	46	2
15	(New South Wales)	Kieren Jack	178	81	28 June 1987	31	2007	NSW/ACT (U18)	229	154
16	(Victoria (state))	Gary Rohan	189	92	7 June 1991	27	2010	Geelong (U18)	95	89
17	(Western Australia)	Darcy Cameron	204	100	18 July 1995	23		Claremont
18	(Western Australia)	Callum Sinclair	200	96	23 September 1989	29	2013	Subiaco, West Coast	64	42
19	(Victoria (state))	Matthew Ling	183	76	21 April 1999	19		Geelong (U18)
20	(Victoria (state))	Sam Reid	196	99	27 December 1991	27	2010	Murray (U18)	120	124
21	(Victoria (state))	Jack Maibaum	193	94	27 March 1998	20		Eastern (U18)
22	(Victoria (state))	Dean Towers	189	88	4 May 1990	28	2014	North Ballarat	49	26
23	(Western Australia)	Lance Franklin	199	107	30 January 1987	31	2005	Perth, Hawthorn	271	860
24	(New South Wales)	Dane Rampe	189	86	2 June 1990	28	2013	UNSW-Eastern	115	6
26	(Victoria (state))	Luke Parker	183	88	25 October 1992	26	2011	Dandenong (U18)	151	117
27	(New South Wales)	Daniel Robinson	184	88	3 July 1994	24	2015	Mosman Football Club	16	5
28	(Victoria (state))	Nic Newman	186	84	15 January 1993	25	2017	Frankston	20	7
29	(South Australia)	George Hewett	188	83	29 December 1995	23	2016	North Adelaide	48	27
30	(Victoria (state))	Tom McCartin	192	82	30 December 1999	19		Geelong (U18)
31	(Western Australia)	Harrison Marsh	189	85	13 January 1994	24	2016	East Fremantle	16	0
33	(Victoria (state))	Ryley Stoddart	184	73	15 October 1999	19		Eastern (U18)
34	(South Australia)	Jordan Dawson	190	88	9 April 1997	21	2017	Sturt	1	0
35	(New South Wales)	Sam Naismith	205	109	16 July 1992	26	2014	North Shore	28	3
36	(Western Australia)	Aliir Aliir	194	94	5 September 1994	24	2016	East Fremantle	16	0
39	(South Australia)	Heath Grundy	192	105	2 June 1986	32	2006	Norwood	237	23
40	(Victoria (state))	Nick Smith	183	83	12 June 1988	30	2008	Oakleigh (U18)	191	10
44	(Victoria (state))	Jake Lloyd	180	79	20 September 1993	25	2014	North Ballarat (U18)	92	23
Rookie list
No.	State	Player	Hgt	Wgt	Date of birth	Age	Debut	Recruited from	Games	Goals
2	(Victoria (state))	Alex Johnson	194	92	2 March 1992	26	2011	Oakleigh (U18)	45	1
25	(Victoria (state))	Ben Ronke	182	77	18 December 1997	21		Calder (U18)
32	(New South Wales)	James Bell	183	79	10 February 1999	19		UNSW-Eastern
38	(Republic of Ireland)	Colin O'Riordan	185	83	12 October 1995	23		Tipperary GAA
41	(New South Wales)	Jake Brown	185	77	19 March 1998	20		St George AFC
42	(Victoria (state))	Robbie Fox	185	85	16 April 1993	25	2017	Coburg VFL	3	1
43	(Victoria (state))	Lewis Melican	195	100	4 November 1996	22	2017	Geelong U18	17	1
45	(Victoria (state))	Angus Styles	185	71	3 May 1999	19		Sandringham U18
46	(Victoria (state))	Joel Amartey	196	88	2 September 1999	19		Sandringham U18
47	(South Australia)	Toby Pink	194	92	11 August 1998	20		Glenelg
Senior coaching panel
	State	Coach	Coaching position				Sydney coaching debut	Former clubs as coach
	(New South Wales)	John Longmire	Senior coach				2002
	(New South Wales)	Brett Kirk	Assistant coach (midfield)				2016	Fremantle (a)
	(Western Australia)	Dean Cox	Assistant coach (midfield)				2018	West Coast (a)
	(Victoria (state))	Rhyce Shaw	Assistant coach (backs)				2016
	(Victoria (state))	Steve Johnson	Assistant coach (forwards)				2018
	(Victoria (state))	John Blakey	Head of Development				2006	Brisbane Lions (a)
	(Republic of Ireland)	Tadhg Kennelly	Development Coach				2018
	(Victoria (state))	Jeremy Laidler	Development Coach				2018

- For players: (c) denotes captain, (vc) denotes vice-captain, (lg) denotes leadership group.
- For coaches: (s) denotes senior coach, (cs) denotes caretaker senior coach, (a) denotes assistant coach, (d) denotes development coach.

== Playing list changes ==
The following summarises all player changes between the conclusion of the 2015 season and the beginning of the 2016 season.

=== In ===
Player	Previous club	League	via
(Victoria (state)) Matthew Ling	Geelong Falcons	TAC Cup	Pick 14, 2017 National Draft
(Victoria (state)) Tom McCartin	Geelong Falcons	TAC Cup	Pick 33, 2017 National Draft
(Victoria (state)) Ryley Stoddart	Eastern Ranges	TAC Cup	Pick 53, 2017 National Draft
(Victoria (state)) Angus Styles	Sandringham Dragons	TAC Cup	Pick 14, 2018 Rookie Draft
(Victoria (state)) Joel Amartey	Sandringham Dragons	TAC Cup	Pick 28, 2018 Rookie Draft
(New South Wales) James Bell	UNSW-Eastern	NEAFL	Category-B Rookie (NSW Zone)
(New South Wales) Jake Brown	St George	Sydney AFL	Category-B Rookie (NSW Zone)

=== Out ===
Player	New club	League	via
(Queensland) Kurt Tippett			Retired
(Victoria (state)) Jeremy Laidler			Retired
(Northern Territory) Shaun Edwards			Retired
(Victoria (state)) Sam Murray	Collingwood	AFL	Traded
(New South Wales) Brandon Jack			Delisted
(New South Wales) Sam Fisher			Delisted
(Victoria (state)) Tyrone Leonardis			Delisted
(Victoria (state)) Michael Talia			Delisted
