= 2016 Sydney Swans season =

Sydney Swans
2016 season
- President: Andrew Pridham
- Coach: John Longmire (6th season)
- Captains: Kieren Jack (4th season); Jarrad McVeigh (6th season)
- Home ground: SCG (Capacity: 48,000)
- NAB Challenge: 6th
- AFL season: 1st (17-5)
- Finals: 2nd (defeated by Western Bulldogs in the Grand Final)
- Bob Skilton Medal: Josh Kennedy
- Leading goalkicker: Lance Franklin (81)
- Highest home attendance: 99,981 vs Western Bulldogs (Grand Final)
- Lowest home attendance: 19,086 vs Melbourne (Round 13)
- Average home attendance: 40,430 (▲8,939)
- Club membership: 56,523 (▲7,687)

The 2016 AFL season was the 120th season in the Australian Football League contested by the Sydney Swans.

== Club summary ==
After having split its home games between the Sydney Cricket Ground and ANZ Stadium since 2002, Sydney returned to playing all games at the Sydney Cricket Ground. The club and the stadium had originally planned to end their agreement at the end of the 2016 season, but the two parties agreed on February 29 to end the agreement one year early. The three 2016 matches which were scheduled for ANZ Stadium (Round 1 vs Collingwood, Round 7 vs Essendon and Round 18 vs Carlton) were shifted to the Sydney Cricket Ground as a result. Under the club's new stadium arrangement, it has committed to playing all home games at the Sydney Cricket Ground in a thirty-year deal, set to end in 2046.

On 12 April 2016, the Swans broke the 50,000 members milestone for the first time, breaking the club's record of 48,836 members set in 2015.

== Squad for 2016 ==
Statistics are correct as of end of 2015 season. Flags represent the state of origin, i.e. the state in which the player played his Under-18s football.

Senior List
No.	State	Player	Hgt (cm)	Wgt (kg)	Date of birth	Age (end 2015)	AFL Debut	Recruited from	Games (end 2015)	Goals (end 2015)
1	(South Australia)	James Rose	185	79	16 April 1996	19	2015	Sturt	2	3
2	(Victoria (state))	Alex Johnson	194	92	2 March 1992	23	2011	Oakleigh (U18)	45	1
3	(New South Wales)	Jarrad McVeigh (c)	184	74	7 April 1985	30	2004	NSW/ACT (U18)	266	184
4	(Victoria (state))	Dan Hannebery (lg)	181	79	24 February 1991	24	2009	Oakleigh (U18)	144	69
5	(New South Wales)	Isaac Heeney	184	80	5 May 1996	19	2015	Cardiff, Sydney Swans Academy	14	16
6	(Western Australia)	Tom Mitchell	181	83	31 May 1993	22	2013	Claremont	39	23
7	(New South Wales)	Harry Cunningham	181	76	6 December 1993	22	2012	NSW/ACT (U18)	52	31
8	(Queensland)	Kurt Tippett	202	108	8 May 1987	28	2008	Southport, Adelaide	152	301
9	(New South Wales)	Abaina Davis	192	97	27 January 1996	19		UNSW-Eastern Suburbs, Sydney Swans Academy
10	(Victoria (state))	Zak Jones	181	79	15 March 1995	20	2014	Dandenong (U18)	15	1
11	(Victoria (state))	Jeremy Laidler	190	89	5 August 1989	26	2009	Calder (U18), Geelong, Carlton	68	7
12	(Victoria (state))	Josh Kennedy (lg)	188	93	20 June 1988	27	2008	Sandringham (U18), Hawthorn	158	95
13	(Tasmania)	Toby Nankervis	199	106	12 August 1994	21	2015	North Launceston	5	1
14	(New South Wales)	Callum Mills	186	80	2 April 1997	18		North Shore, Sydney Swans Academy
15	(New South Wales)	Kieren Jack (c)	178	75	28 June 1987	28	2007	NSW/ACT (U18)	185	131
16	(Victoria (state))	Gary Rohan	188	90	7 June 1991	24	2010	Geelong (U18)	61	42
17	(New South Wales)	Jack Hiscox	184	74	23 March 1995	20		Sydney Uni, Sydney Swans Academy
18	(Western Australia)	Callum Sinclair	200	99	23 September 1989	26	2013	Subiaco, West Coast	29	18
19	(Western Australia)	Tom Derickx	200	102	7 December 1987	28	2012	Claremont, Richmond	15	6
20	(Victoria (state))	Sam Reid	196	98	27 December 1991	24	2010	Murray (U18)	98	94
21	(Victoria (state))	Ben McGlynn	172	76	6 August 1985	30	2006	Bendigo (U18), Hawthorn	153	171
22	(Victoria (state))	Dean Towers	189	86	4 May 1990	25	2014	North Ballarat	17	8
23	(Western Australia)	Lance Franklin	197	107	30 January 1987	29	2005	Perth, Hawthorn	221	706
24	(New South Wales)	Dane Rampe (lg)	188	87	2 June 1990	25	2013	UNSW-Eastern	72	5
25	(Victoria (state))	Ted Richards	193	92	11 January 1983	32	2002	Sandringham (U18), Essendon	253	32
26	(Victoria (state))	Luke Parker (lg)	183	85	25 October 1992	23	2011	Dandenong (U18)	101	78
27	(New South Wales)	Daniel Robinson	185	82	3 July 1994	21	2015	Mosman Football Club	4	2
29	(South Australia)	George Hewett	185	83	29 December 1995	20		North Adelaide
30	(Victoria (state))	Tyrone Leonardis	182	78	22 February 1997	18		Northern (U18)
32	(Victoria (state))	Michael Talia	194	94	11 February 1993	22	2012	Calder (U18), Western Bulldogs	30	3
33	(New South Wales)	Brandon Jack	182	77	25 May 1994	21	2013	Pennant Hills	27	16
34	(South Australia)	Jordan Dawson	190	84	9 April 1997	18		Sturt
35	(New South Wales)	Sam Naismith	206	108	16 July 1992	23	2014	North Shore	1	0
36	(Western Australia)	Aliir Aliir	193	94	5 September 1994	21		East Fremantle
39	(South Australia)	Heath Grundy (lg)	192	106	2 June 1986	29	2006	Norwood	187	23
40	(Victoria (state))	Nick Smith (lg)	183	79	12 June 1988	27	2008	Oakleigh (U18)	142	9
42	(Victoria (state))	Xavier Richards	195	91	25 April 1993	22	2013	Sandringham (U18)	2	0
44	(Victoria (state))	Jake Lloyd	180	76	20 September 1993	22	2014	North Ballarat (U18)	43	11
Rookie List
No.	State	Player	Hgt	Wgt	Date of birth	Age	Debut	Recruited from	Games	Goals
28	(Victoria (state))	Nic Newman	188	81	15 January 1993	22		Frankston
31	(Western Australia)	Harry Marsh	189	82	13 January 1994	21		East Fremantle
38	(Republic of Ireland)	Colin O'Riordan	188	87	12 October 1995	20		Tipperary GAA
41	(Victoria (state))	Tom Papley	176	71	13 July 1996	19		Gippsland (U18)
43	(Victoria (state))	Lewis Melican	194	80	4 November 1996	19		Geelong U18
45	(New South Wales)	Jordan Foote	183	76	2 January 1996	19		UNSW-Eastern Suburbs, Sydney Swans Academy
46	(Victoria (state))	Sam Murray	188	72	2 September 1997	18		Wodonga
47	(Victoria (state))	Kyle Galloway	206	104	21 November 1996	19		Shepparton
Senior coaching panel
	State	Coach	Coaching position				Sydney Coaching debut	Former clubs as coach
	(New South Wales)	John Longmire	Senior coach				2002
	(South Australia)	Stuart Dew	Senior Assistant Coach (midfield)				2009
	(South Australia)	Josh Francou	Assistant coach (Stoppages)				2015
	(New South Wales)	Brett Kirk	Assistant coach (Forwards)				2016	Fremantle (a)
	(Victoria (state))	Henry Playfair	Assistant coach (defence)				2010	Sydney Swans (NEAFL) (s)
	(Victoria (state))	John Blakey	Coaching Director/Head of Development				2006	Brisbane Lions (a)
	(Victoria (state))	Nick Davis	Development coach				2016
	(Victoria (state))	Rhyce Shaw	Reserves Coach				2016
	(South Australia)	Jared Crouch	Academy coaching Director				2011

- For players: (c) denotes captain, (vc) denotes vice-captain, (lg) denotes leadership group.
- For coaches: (s) denotes senior coach, (cs) denotes caretaker senior coach, (a) denotes assistant coach, (d) denotes development coach.

== Playing list changes ==
The following summarises all player changes between the conclusion of the 2015 season and the beginning of the 2016 season.

=== In ===
Player	Previous Club	League	via
(Western Australia) Callum Sinclair	West Coast	AFL	Trade
(Victoria (state)) Michael Talia	Western Bulldogs	AFL	Trade
(New South Wales) Callum Mills	North Shore	Sydney AFL	Pick 3, 2015 National Draft (Academy selection)
(Victoria (state)) Tyrone Leonardis	Northern (U18)	TAC Cup	Pick 51, 2015 National Draft
(South Australia) Jordan Dawson	Sturt	SANFL	Pick 56, 2015 National Draft
(Victoria (state)) Tom Papley	Gippsland (U18)	TAC Cup	Pick 14, 2016 Rookie Draft
(Victoria (state)) Kyle Galloway	Shepparton	GVFL	Pick 59, 2016 Rookie Draft
(Victoria (state)) Sam Murray	Wodonga	O&MFL	Pick 66, 2016 Rookie Draft
(Republic of Ireland) Colin O'Riordan	Tipperary	GAA	Pick 69, 2016 Rookie Draft (International Rookie)

=== Out ===
Player	New Club	League	via
(Victoria (state)) Adam Goodes			Retired
(Victoria (state)) Rhyce Shaw			Retired
(Canada) Mike Pyke			Retired
(Western Australia) Lewis Jetta	West Coast	AFL	Trade
(New South Wales) Craig Bird	Essendon	AFL	Trade
(New South Wales) Lloyd Perris			Delisted
(Victoria (state)) Sean McLaren			Delisted

=== List management ===
Player	Change
(New South Wales) Sam Naismith	Promoted from the rookie list to the senior list
(Western Australia) Harry Marsh	Demoted from the senior list to the rookie list during 2016 Rookie Draft (pick 32)

== Season summary ==
=== Pre-season matches ===
**Rd**	**Date and local time**	**Opponent**	**Scores** (Sydney's scores indicated in **bold**)			**Venue**	**Attendance**
**Rd**	**Date and local time**	**Opponent**	Home	Away	Result	**Venue**	**Attendance**
1	Saturday, 20 February (4:40 pm)	Port Adelaide	**1.10.12 (81)**	1.7.9 (60)	Won by 21 points	Blacktown International Sportspark (H)	3,172
2	Friday, 4 March (7:10 pm)	Greater Western Sydney	**1.8.3 (60)**	0.14.10 (94)	Lost by 34 points	Drummoyne Oval (H)	4,754
3	Friday, 11 March (5:50 pm)	Carlton	1.8.12 (69)	**0.14.7 (91)**	Won by 22 points	Etihad Stadium (A)	6,804

=== Home and away season ===
**Rd**	**Date and local time**	**Opponent**	**Scores** (Sydney's scores indicated in **bold**)			**Venue**	**Attendance**	**Ladder** **position**	**Record**	**Ref.**
**Rd**	**Date and local time**	**Opponent**	Home	Away	Result	**Venue**	**Attendance**	**Ladder** **position**	**Record**	**Ref.**
1	Saturday, 26 March (7:25 pm)	Collingwood	**18.25 (133)**	7.11 (53)	Won by 80 points	Sydney Cricket Ground (H)	33,857	**2nd**	1-0	
2	Sunday, 3 April (4:40 pm)	Carlton	10.11 (71)	**20.11 (131)**	Won by 60 points	Etihad Stadium (A)	33,146	**2nd**	2-0	
3	Saturday, 9 April (4:35 pm)	Greater Western Sydney	**14.9 (93)**	10.8 (68)	Won by 25 points	Sydney Cricket Ground (H)	37,045	**1st**	3-0	
4	Saturday, 16 April (7:10 pm)	Adelaide	16.17 (113)	**15.13 (103)**	Lost by 10 points	Adelaide Oval (A)	51,330	**3rd**	3-1	
5	Saturday, 23 April (1:40 pm)	West Coast	**12.16 (88)**	7.7 (49)	Won by 39 points	Sydney Cricket Ground (H)	35,427	**3rd**	4-1	
6	Sunday, 1 May (1:10 pm)	Brisbane Lions	14.10 (94)	**15.7 (97)**	Won by 3 points	The Gabba (A)	14,646	**3rd**	5-1	
7	Saturday, 7 May (4:35 pm)	Essendon	**20.15 (135)**	7.12 (54)	Won by 81 points	Sydney Cricket Ground (H)	29,527	**3rd**	6-1	
8	Saturday, 14 May (7:25 pm)	Richmond	14.17 (101)	**15.10 (100)**	Lost by 1 point	Melbourne Cricket Ground (A)	36,014	**4th**	6-2	
9	Friday, 20 May (7:50 pm)	Hawthorn	7.13 (55)	**10.9 (69)**	Won by 14 points	Melbourne Cricket Ground (A)	61,552	**4th**	7-2	
10	Friday, 27 May (7:50 pm)	North Melbourne	**14.7 (91)**	9.11 (65)	Won by 26 points	Sydney Cricket Ground (H)	38,498	**2nd**	8-2	
11	Saturday, 4 June (7:25 pm)	Gold Coast	6.5 (41)	**11.13 (79)**	Won by 38 points	Metricon Stadium (A)	4,368	**2nd**	9-2	
12	Sunday, 12 June (4:40 pm)	Greater Western Sydney	15.15 (105)	**9.9 (63)**	Lost by 42 points	Spotless Stadium (A)	21,541	**3rd**	9-3	
13	Sunday, 19 June (1:10 pm)	Melbourne	**12.14 (86)**	4.7 (31)	Won by 55 points	Sydney Cricket Ground (H)	19,086	**2nd**	10-3	
14	Bye							**2nd**	10-3	
15	Saturday, 2 July (4:35 pm)	Western Bulldogs	**11.13 (79)**	13.5 (83)	Lost by 4 points	Sydney Cricket Ground (H)	33,386	**4th**	10-4	
16	Friday, 8 July (7:50 pm)	Geelong	9.6 (60)	**15.8 (98)**	Won by 38 points	Simonds Stadium (A)	24,339	**2nd**	11-4	
17	Thursday, 14 July (7:20 pm)	Hawthorn	**10.10 (70)**	11.9 (75)	Lost by 5 points	Sydney Cricket Ground (H)	42,314	**5th**	11-5	
18	Saturday, 23 July (1:45 pm)	Carlton	**10.14 (74)**	10.8 (68)	Won by 6 points	Sydney Cricket Ground (H)	31,765	**3rd**	12-5	
19	Sunday, 31 July (1:20 pm)	Fremantle	7.5 (47)	**21.11 (137)**	Won by 90 points	Domain Stadium (A)	32,401	**3rd**	13-5	
20	Saturday, 6 August (1:45 pm)	Port Adelaide	**14.16 (100)**	4.9 (33)	Won by 67 points	Sydney Cricket Ground (H)	30,204	**2nd**	14-5	
21	Saturday, 13 August (7:25 pm)	St Kilda	11.10 (76)	**23.8 (146)**	Won by 70 points	Etihad Stadium (A)	33,059	**2nd**	15-5	
22	Saturday, 20 August (1:45 pm)	North Melbourne	10.16 (76)	**12.13 (85)**	Won by 9 points	Blundstone Arena (A)	16,495	**1st**	16-5	
23	Saturday, 27 August (4:35 pm)	Richmond	**25.14 (164)**	7.9 (51)	Won by 113 points	Sydney Cricket Ground (H)	36,570	**1st**	17-5	

=== Finals matches ===
**Round**	**Date and local time**	**Opponent**	**Scores** (Sydney's scores indicated in **bold**)			**Venue**	**Attendance**	**Ref**
**Round**	**Date and local time**	**Opponent**	Home	Away	Result	**Venue**	**Attendance**	**Ref**
QF	Saturday, 10 September (3:20 pm)	Greater Western Sydney	**7.13 (55)**	12.19 (91)	Lost by 36 points	Stadium Australia (H)	60,222	
SF	Saturday, 17 September (7:25 pm)	Adelaide	**18.10 (118)**	12.10 (82)	Won by 36 points	Sydney Cricket Ground (H)	38,136	
PF	Friday, 23 September (7:50 pm)	Geelong	8.12 (60)	**15.7 (97)**	Won by 37 points	Melbourne Cricket Ground (A)	71,772	
GF	Saturday, 1 October (2:30 pm)	Western Bulldogs	**10.7 (67)**	13.11 (89)	Lost by 22 points	Melbourne Cricket Ground (H)	99,981	

== Ladder ==
Pos	Team	Pld	W	L	D	PF	PA	PP	Pts	Qualification
1	Sydney	22	17	5	0	2221	1469	151.2	68	2016 finals
2	Geelong	22	17	5	0	2235	1554	143.8	68	2016 finals
3	Hawthorn	22	17	5	0	2134	1800	118.6	68	2016 finals
4	Greater Western Sydney	22	16	6	0	2380	1663	143.1	64	2016 finals
5	Adelaide	22	16	6	0	2483	1795	138.3	64	2016 finals
6	West Coast	22	16	6	0	2181	1678	130.0	64	2016 finals
7	Western Bulldogs (P)	22	15	7	0	1857	1609	115.4	60	2016 finals
8	North Melbourne	22	12	10	0	1956	1859	105.2	48	2016 finals
9	St Kilda	22	12	10	0	1953	2041	95.7	48	
10	Port Adelaide	22	10	12	0	2055	1939	106.0	40	
11	Melbourne	22	10	12	0	1944	1991	97.6	40	
12	Collingwood	22	9	13	0	1910	1998	95.6	36	
13	Richmond	22	8	14	0	1713	2155	79.5	32	
14	Carlton	22	7	15	0	1568	1978	79.3	28	
15	Gold Coast	22	6	16	0	1778	2273	78.2	24	
16	Fremantle	22	4	18	0	1574	2119	74.3	16	
17	Brisbane Lions	22	3	19	0	1770	2872	61.6	12	
18	Essendon	22	3	19	0	1437	2356	61.0	12	

Source: AFL
Rules for classification: 1) points; 2) percentage; 3) number of points for.
(P) Premiers

== Individual awards and records ==
=== Bob Skilton Medal ===
Bob Skilton Medal
Rank	Player	Votes
1	Josh Kennedy	922
2	Dan Hannebery	913
3	Heath Grundy	865
4	Luke Parker	834
5	Dane Rampe	833
6	Lance Franklin	827
7	Jake Lloyd	684
8	Tom Mitchell	672
9	Nick Smith	622
10	Kieren Jack	601

Rising Star Award: Callum Mills

Dennis Carroll Trophy for Most Improved Player: Aliir Aliir

Barry Round Shield for Best Clubman: Alex Johnson

Paul Kelly Players’ Player: Lance Franklin

Paul Roos Award for Best Player in a Finals Series: Heath Grundy & Josh Kennedy

=== All-Australian Team ===
AFL Rising Star
No.	State	Player	Status	Position
4	(Victoria (state))	Dan Hannebery	In Team	Wing
12	(Victoria (state))	Josh Kennedy	In Team	Centre
23	(Western Australia)	Lance Franklin	In Team	Centre-half forward
24	(New South Wales)	Dane Rampe	In Team	Back pocket
26	(Victoria (state))	Luke Parker	In Team	Interchange bench

=== Milestones ===
Milestones
No.	State	Player	Milestone	Round
8	(Queensland)	Kurt Tippett	50th club game	Round 2
12	(Victoria (state))	Josh Kennedy	150th club game	Round 5
4	(Victoria (state))	Dan Hannebery	150th career game	Round 6
11	(Victoria (state))	Jeremy Laidler	50th club game	Round 8
40	(Victoria (state))	Nick Smith	150th career game	Round 9
6	(Western Australia)	Tom Mitchell	50th career game	Round 11
39	(South Australia)	Heath Grundy	200th career game	Round 13
23	(Western Australia)	Lance Franklin	750th career goal	Round 13
15	(New South Wales)	Kieren Jack	200th career game	Round 16
23	(Western Australia)	Lance Franklin	200th club goal	Round 23
	(New South Wales)	John Longmire	100th career coaching win	Round 23

=== Debuts ===
Debuts
No.	State	Player	Round
14	(New South Wales)	Callum Mills	Round 1
18	(Western Australia)	Callum Sinclair	Round 1^{1}
29	(South Australia)	George Hewett	Round 1
32	(Victoria (state))	Michael Talia	Round 1^{1}
41	(Victoria (state))	Tom Papley	Round 1
36	(Western Australia)	Aliir Aliir	Round 6
17	(New South Wales)	Jack Hiscox	Round 8
31	(Western Australia)	Harry Marsh	Round 10
45	(New South Wales)	Jordan Foote	Round 18

^{1}Had previously played for another club but played their first match for the Sydney Swans.

=== AFL Rising Star ===
AFL Rising Star
No.	State	Player	Status	Round
41	(Victoria (state))	Tom Papley	Nominated	Round 5
14	(New South Wales)	Callum Mills	Winner	Round 16

== Reserves ==
=== Regular season ===
**Rd**	**Date and local time**	**Opponent**	**Scores** (Sydney's scores indicated in **bold**)			**Venue**	**Ladder** **position**
**Rd**	**Date and local time**	**Opponent**	Home	Away	Result	**Venue**	**Ladder** **position**
1	Saturday, 2 April (11:00 am)	Brisbane Lions	5.10 (40)	**25.12 (162)**	Won by 122 points	Burpengary Sports Complex (A)	**1st**
2	Saturday, 9 April (10:30 am)	UWS Giants	**17.13 (115)**	14.13 (97)	Won by 18 points	Blacktown International Sportspark (H)	**1st**
3	Saturday, 16 April (1:00 pm)	Redland	7.10 (52)	**23.11 (149)**	Won by 97 points	Leyshon Park (A)	**1st**
4	Saturday, 23 April (9:30 am)	Southport	**12.13 (85)**	6.9 (45)	Won by 40 points	Drummoyne Oval (H)	**1st**
5	Sunday, 1 May (9:30 am)	Brisbane Lions	3.7 (25)	**20.15 (135)**	Won by 110 points	Coorparoo (A)	**1st**
6	Saturday, 7 May (12:00 pm)	Gold Coast	**18.12 (120)**	8.7 (55)	Won by 65 points	Drummoyne Oval (H)	**1st**
7	Saturday, 14 May (12:00 pm)	Canberra	4.4 (28)	**26.14 (170)**	Won by 142 points	Manuka Oval (A)	**1st**
8	Bye						**1st**
9	Friday, 27 May (4:10 pm)	Sydney University	6.8 (44)	**15.13 (103)**	Won by 59 points	Sydney Cricket Ground (A)	**1st**
10	Saturday, 4 June (12:00 pm)	Gold Coast	3.3 (21)	**15.17 (107)**	Won by 86 points	Metricon Stadium (A)	**1st**
11	Sunday, 12 June (1:00 pm)	UWS Giants	16.13 (109)	**16.12 (108)**	Lost by 1 point	Spotless Stadium (A)	**1st**
12	Sunday, 19 June (9:30 am)	Aspley	**16.14 (110)**	7.5 (47)	Won by 63 points	Sydney Cricket Ground (H)	**1st**
13	Bye						**1st**
14	Saturday, 2 July (12:55 pm)	NT Thunder	**19.13 (127)**	9.7 (61)	Won by 66 points	Sydney Cricket Ground (H)	**1st**
15	Saturday, 9 July (12:00 pm)	Canberra	6.7 (43)	**20.20 (140)**	Won by 97 points	Manuka Oval (A)	**1st**
16	Saturday, 16 July (12:00 pm)	Gold Coast	**26.14 (170)**	7.4 (46)	Won by 124 points	Newcastle Oval (H)	**1st**
17	Saturday, 23 July (10:05 am)	UWS Giants	**4.19 (43)**	10.8 (68)	Lost by 25 points	Sydney Cricket Ground (H)	**1st**
18	Bye						**1st**
19	Saturday, 6 August (10:05 am)	Brisbane Lions	**24.16 (160)**	3.7 (25)	Won by 135 points	Sydney Cricket Ground (H)	**1st**
20	Saturday, 13 August (6:30 pm)	NT Thunder	14.8 (92)	**8.6 (54)**	Lost by 38 points	Marrara Oval (A)	**1st**
21	Saturday, 20 August (2:00 pm)	Sydney University	5.13 (43)	**10.8 (68)**	Won by 25 points	Blacktown International Sportspark (A)	**1st**

=== Finals series ===
**Rd**	**Date and local time**	**Opponent**	**Scores** (Sydney's scores indicated in **bold**)			**Venue**
**Rd**	**Date and local time**	**Opponent**	Home	Away	Result	**Venue**
EF	Bye					
SF	Saturday, 3 September (11:25 am)	Aspley	**15.23 (113)**	4.7 (31)	Won by 82 points	Blacktown International Sportspark (H)
GF	Sunday, 11 September (1:30 pm)	UWS Giants	**11.12 (78)**	11.16 (82)	Lost by 4 points	Blacktown International Sportspark (H)

=== Ladder ===
2016 Ladder
Pos	Team	Pld	W	L	D	PF	PA	PP	Pts
**1**	Sydney	**18**	**15**	**3**	**0**	**2126**	**941**	**225.9**	60
2	WSU Giants (P)	18	12	6	0	1911	1319	144.9	48
3	Sydney University	18	12	6	0	1471	1368	107.5	48
4	Aspley	18	12	6	0	1527	1432	106.6	48
5	NT Thunder	18	11	7	0	1619	1388	116.6	44
6	Gold Coast	18	8	10	0	1460	1832	79.7	32
7	Southport	18	7	11	0	1522	1473	103.3	28
8	Redland	18	7	11	0	1269	1572	80.7	28
9	Canberra	18	3	15	0	1196	1883	63.5	12
10	Brisbane	18	3	15	0	1061	1954	54.3	12

Rules for classification: 1) points; 2) percentage; 3) number of points for.
(P) Premiers
