= 2014 Sydney Swans season =

Sydney Swans
2014 season
- President: Andrew Pridham
- Coach: John Longmire (4th season)
- Captains: Kieren Jack (2nd season); Jarrad McVeigh (4th season)
- Home ground: SCG; ANZ Stadium
- AFL season: 1st (17-5)
- Finals series: 2nd
- Bob Skilton Medal: Luke Parker
- Leading goalkicker: Lance Franklin (79)
- Highest home attendance: 99,454 vs Hawthorn (Grand Final)
- Lowest home attendance: 25,376 vs Fremantle (Round 5)
- Average home attendance: 38,715 (▲10,802)
- Club membership: 40,126 (▲3,768)

The 2014 AFL season was the 118th season in the Australian Football League contested by the Sydney Swans.

== Squad for 2014 ==
Statistics are correct as of end of 2013 season. Flags represent the state of origin, i.e. the state in which the player played his Under-18s football.

Senior List
No.	State	Player	Hgt (cm)	Wgt (kg)	Date of birth	Age (end 2013)	AFL Debut	Recruited from	Games (end 2013)	Goals (end 2013)
1	(Victoria (state))	Tim Membrey	188	89	26 May 1994	19		Murray (U18)
2	(Victoria (state))	Rhyce Shaw (lg)	181	81	16 October 1981	32	2000	Preston (U18), Collingwood	193	42
3	(New South Wales)	Jarrad McVeigh (c)	183	82	7 April 1985	28	2004	NSW/ACT (U18)	219	157
4	(Victoria (state))	Dan Hannebery	181	81	24 February 1991	22	2009	Oakleigh (U18)	101	43
5	(Victoria (state))	Ryan O'Keefe (lg)	187	88	24 January 1981	32	2000	Calder (U18)	282	260
6	(Western Australia)	Tom Mitchell	181	83	31 May 1993	20	2013	Claremont	14	11
7	(New South Wales)	Harry Cunningham	180	80	6 December 1993	20	2012	NSW/ACT (U18)	6	4
8	(Queensland)	Kurt Tippett	202	104	8 May 1987	26	2008	Southport, Adelaide	116	223
9	(Victoria (state))	Nick Malceski	188	86	15 August 1984	29	2005	Eastern (U18)	151	59
10	(Victoria (state))	Zak Jones	183	75	15 March 1995	18		Dandenong (U18)
11	(Victoria (state))	Jeremy Laidler	189	89	5 August 1989	24	2009	Calder (U18), Geelong, Carlton	26	2
12	(Victoria (state))	Josh Kennedy (lg)	188	96	20 June 1988	25	2008	Sandringham (U18), Hawthorn	111	67
13	(Tasmania)	Toby Nankervis	199	102	12 August 1994	19		North Launceston
14	(New South Wales)	Craig Bird	179	85	21 January 1989	24	2008	NSW/ACT (U18)	110	47
15	(New South Wales)	Kieren Jack (c)	178	78	28 June 1987	26	2007	NSW/ACT (U18)	139	102
16	(Victoria (state))	Gary Rohan	189	89	7 June 1991	22	2010	Geelong (U18)	27	23
17	(Republic of Ireland)	Tommy Walsh	193	99	26 February 1988	25	2012	Kerins O'Rahilly's GAA, St Kilda	5	3
18	(Western Australia)	Jordan Lockyer	191	91	15 June 1993	20		West Perth
19	(Western Australia)	Tom Derickx	201	100	7 December 1987	26	2012	Claremont, Richmond	2	0
20	(Victoria (state))	Sam Reid	196	96	27 December 1991	22	2010	Murray (U18)	56	61
21	(Victoria (state))	Ben McGlynn (lg)	171	75	6 August 1985	28	2006	Bendigo (U18), Hawthorn	125	141
22	(Victoria (state))	Dean Towers	189	83	4 May 1990	23		North Ballarat
23	(Western Australia)	Lance Franklin	196	103	30 January 1987	27	2005	Perth, Hawthorn	182	580
24	(New South Wales)	Dane Rampe	189	89	2 June 1990	23	2013	UNSW-Eastern	23	1
25	(Victoria (state))	Ted Richards (lg)	192	94	11 January 1983	30	2002	Sandringham (U18), Essendon	206	32
26	(Victoria (state))	Luke Parker	183	86	25 October 1992	21	2011	Dandenong (U18)	57	35
28	(Victoria (state))	Matthew Dick	187	86	3 November 1994	19		Calder (U18)
29	(South Australia)	George Hewett	186	74	29 December 1995	18		North Adelaide
30	(New South Wales)	Lewis Roberts-Thomson	194	94	8 September 1983	30	2003	NSW/ACT (U18)	174	52
31	(Western Australia)	Harrison Marsh	189	84	13 January 1994	20		East Fremantle
32	(Western Australia)	Lewis Jetta	181	77	4 May 1989	24	2010	Swan Districts Football Club	78	71
33	(New South Wales)	Brandon Jack	182	77	25 May 1994	19	2013	Pennant Hills	9	7
34	(Victoria (state))	Alex Johnson	193	91	2 March 1992	21	2011	Oakleigh (U18)	45	1
36	(Western Australia)	Aliir Aliir	195	91	5 September 1994	19		East Fremantle
37	(Victoria (state))	Adam Goodes (lg)	191	100	8 January 1980	34	1999	North Ballarat (U18)	331	409
38	(Canada)	Mike Pyke	201	104	24 March 1984	29	2009	Canada Maple Leafs	71	41
39	(South Australia)	Heath Grundy	192	100	2 June 1986	27	2006	Norwood	139	22
40	(Victoria (state))	Nick Smith (lg)	183	83	12 June 1988	25	2008	Oakleigh (U18)	98	9
Rookie List
No.	State	Player	Hgt	Wgt	Date of birth	Age	Debut	Recruited from	Games	Goals
27	(New South Wales)	Daniel Robinson	183	84	3 July 1994	19		Mosman Football Club
35	(New South Wales)	Sam Naismith	203	104	16 July 1992	21		North Shore Australian Football Club
41	(New South Wales)	Lloyd Perris	179	74	2 January 1995	19		NSW/ACT (U18)
42	(Victoria (state))	Xavier Richards	194	87	25 April 1993	20	2013	Sandringham (U18)	1	0
44	(Victoria (state))	Jake Lloyd	180	75	20 September 1993	20		North Ballarat (U18)
45	(United States)	Patrick Mitchell	201	107	25 May 1989	24		North Dakota
46	(Victoria (state))	Shane Biggs	187	83	5 August 1991	22	2013	Bendigo	3	0
Senior coaching panel
	State	Coach	Coaching position				Sydney Coaching debut	Former clubs as coach
	(New South Wales)	John Longmire	Senior coach				2011
	(Victoria (state))	John Blakey	Assistant coach (defence)				2006	Brisbane Lions (a)
	(Victoria (state))	Henry Playfair	Assistant coach (forward-line)				2010	Sydney Swans (NEAFL) (s)
	(South Australia)	Stuart Dew	Assistant coach (strategy and midfield)				2009
	(South Australia)	Jared Crouch	Development coach				2011
	(South Australia)	Martin Mattner	Assistant coach (midfield)				2013

- For players: (c) denotes captain, (vc) denotes vice-captain, (lg) denotes leadership group.
- For coaches: (s) denotes senior coach, (cs) denotes caretaker senior coach, (a) denotes assistant coach, (d) denotes development coach.

== Playing list changes ==
The following summarises all player changes between the conclusion of the 2013 season and the beginning of the 2014 season.

=== In ===
Player	Previous Club	League	via
(Western Australia) Lance Franklin	Hawthorn Football Club	AFL	Free Agency
(Victoria (state)) Jeremy Laidler	Carlton Football Club	AFL	Free Agency
(Victoria (state)) Tom Derickx	Richmond Football Club	AFL	Free Agency
(Victoria (state)) Zak Jones	Dandenong Stingrays	TAC Cup	AFL National Draft, first round (No. 15 overall)
(South Australia) George Hewett	North Adelaide	SANFL	AFL National Draft, second round (No. 32 overall)
(Tasmania) Toby Nankervis	North Launceston	TFL	AFL National Draft, second round (No. 35 overall)
(Western Australia) Aliir Aliir	East Fremantle	WAFL	AFL National Draft, third round (No. 44 overall)
(United States) Patrick Mitchell	USA		AFL Rookie Draft, third round (No. 45 overall)
(New South Wales) Lloyd Perris	NSW/ACT Rams	NEAFL	AFL Rookie Draft, fourth round (No. 55 overall)

=== Out ===
Player	New Club	League	via
(South Australia) Martin Mattner			Retired
(Victoria (state)) Jude Bolton			Retired
(Western Australia) Mitch Morton	Perth	WAFL	Retired
(Victoria (state)) Alex Brown	Port Melbourne	VFL	Delisted
(New South Wales) Tony Armstrong	Collingwood	AFL	Delisted
(Victoria (state)) Shane Mumford	GWS Giants	AFL	Free Agent
(Queensland) Jesse White	Collingwood	AFL	Traded
(Victoria (state)) Andrejs Everitt	Carlton	AFL	Traded

=== List management ===
Player	Change
(New South Wales) Brandon Jack	Promoted from the rookie list to the senior list during AFL National Draft, fifth round (No. 80 overall)
(New South Wales) Dane Rampe	Promoted from the rookie list to the senior list during AFL National Draft, sixth round (No. 90 overall)

== Season summary ==
=== Pre-season matches ===
**Rd**	**Date and local time**	**Opponent**	**Scores** (Sydney's scores indicated in **bold**)			**Venue**	**Attendance**
**Rd**	**Date and local time**	**Opponent**	Home	Away	Result	**Venue**	**Attendance**
1	Thursday, 20 February (7:10 pm)	Greater Western Sydney	0.11.9 (75)	**2.15.7 (115)**	Won by 40 points	StarTrack Oval (A)	6,854
2	Thursday, 27 February (7:10 pm)	West Coast	**0.5.7 (37)**	0.10.12 (72)	Lost by 35 points	Blacktown Olympic Park (H)	3,045
3	Sunday, 8 March (2:30 pm)	Brisbane Lions	8.11 (59)	**12.14 (86)**	Won by 27 points	Burpengary (A)	6,096

=== Home and away season ===
**Rd**	**Date and local time**	**Opponent**	**Scores** (Sydney's scores indicated in **bold**)			**Venue**	**Attendance**	**Ladder**; **Position**	**Ref**
**Rd**	**Date and local time**	**Opponent**	Home	Away	Result	**Venue**	**Attendance**	**Ladder**; **Position**	**Ref**
1	Saturday, 15 March (4:40 pm)	Greater Western Sydney	15.9 (99)	**9.13 (67)**	Lost by 32 points	GIANTS Stadium (A)	17,102	14th	
2	Saturday, 29 March (7:40 pm)	Collingwood	**10.9 (69)**	12.17 (89)	Lost by 20 points	ANZ Stadium (H)	32,347	14th	
3	Saturday, 5 April (1:40 pm)	Adelaide	9.17 (71)	**21.8 (134)**	Won by 63 points	Adelaide Oval (A)	47,426	11th	
4	Sunday, 13 April (1:10 pm)	North Melbourne	**6.12 (48)**	13.13 (91)	Lost by 43 points	Sydney Cricket Ground (H)	25,505	13th	
5	Saturday, 19 April (4:40 pm)	Fremantle	**13.14 (92)**	11.9 (75)	Won by 17 points	Sydney Cricket Ground (H)	25,376	13th	
6	Saturday, 26 April (7:40 pm)	Melbourne	5.8 (38)	**9.15 (69)**	Won by 31 points	Melbourne Cricket Ground (A)	24,855	9th	
7	Saturday, 3 May (7:40 pm)	Brisbane Lions	6.8 (44)	**18.15 (123)**	Won by 79 points	The Gabba (A)	17,957	**7th**	
8	Friday, 9 May (7:50 pm)	Hawthorn	**15.17 (107)**	13.10 (88)	Won by 19 points	ANZ Stadium (H)	34,506	**4th**	
9	Friday, 16 May (7:50 pm)	Essendon	9.10 (64)	**18.6 (114)**	Won by 50 points	Etihad Stadium (A)	41,098	**3rd**	
10	Bye							**5th**	
11	Thursday, 29 May (7:10 pm)	Geelong	**22.16 (148)**	5.8 (38)	Won by 110 points	Sydney Cricket Ground (H)	37,355	**3rd**	
12	Sunday, 8 June (3:20 pm)	Gold Coast	10.14 (74)	**17.7 (109)**	Won by 35 points	Metricon Stadium (A)	21,354	**3rd**	
13	Saturday, 14 June (2:10 pm)	Port Adelaide	**14.14 (98)**	13.16 (94)	Won by 4 points	Sydney Cricket Ground (H)	41,317	**3rd**	
14	Friday, 20 June (7:50 pm)	Richmond	7.9 (51)	**9.8 (62)**	Won by 11 points	Melbourne Cricket Ground (A)	34,633	**3rd**	
15	Saturday, 28 June (7:40 pm)	Greater Western Sydney	**15.16 (106)**	8.12 (60)	Won by 46 points	Sydney Cricket Ground (H)	27,778	**3rd**	
16	Sunday, 6 July (1:20 pm)	West Coast	7.9 (51)	**10.19 (79)**	Won by 28 points	Patersons Stadium (A)	25,076	**1st**	
17	Saturday, 12 July (7:40 pm)	Carlton	**18.14 (122)**	7.9 (51)	Won by 71 points	Sydney Cricket Ground (H)	34,965	**1st**	
18	Saturday, 26 July (7:40 pm)	Hawthorn	15.14 (104)	**13.16 (94)**	Lost by 10 points	Melbourne Cricket Ground (A)	72,760	**1st**	
19	Friday, 1 August (7:50 pm)	Essendon	**11.13 (79)**	8.9 (57)	Won by 22 points	Sydney Cricket Ground (H)	36,804	**2nd**	
20	Saturday, 9 August (7:50 pm)	Port Adelaide	7.16 (58)	**12.12 (84)**	Won by 26 points	Adelaide Oval (A)	50,807	**2nd**	
21	Saturday, 16 August (1:45 pm)	St Kilda	**19.13 (127)**	8.8 (56)	Won by 71 points	Sydney Cricket Ground (H)	31,361	**1st**	
22	Sunday, 24 August (3:20 pm)	Western Bulldogs	9.13 (67)	**20.10 (130)**	Won by 63 points	Etihad Stadium (A)	22,430	**1st**	
23	Saturday, 30 August (4:40 pm)	Richmond	**9.11 (65)**	10.8 (68)	Lost by 3 points	ANZ Stadium (H)	31,227	**1st**	

=== Finals matches ===
**Rd**	**Date and local time**	**Opponent**	**Scores** (Sydney's scores indicated in **bold**)			**Venue**	**Attendance**	**Ref**
**Rd**	**Date and local time**	**Opponent**	Home	Away	Result	**Venue**	**Attendance**	**Ref**
QF	Saturday, 6 September (2:45 pm)	Fremantle	**13.15 (93)**	10.9 (69)	Won by 24 points	ANZ Stadium (H)	35,998	
SF	Bye							
PF	Friday, 19 September (7:50 pm)	North Melbourne	**19.22 (136)**	9.11 (65)	Won by 71 points	ANZ Stadium (H)	48,029	
GF	Saturday, 27 September (2:40 pm)	Hawthorn	**11.8 (74)**	21.11 (137)	Lost by 63 points	MCG (H)	99,454	

== Ladder ==
2014 AFL ladder
Pos	Team	Pld	W	L	D	PF	PA	PP	Pts	
1	Sydney	22	17	5	0	2126	1488	142.9	68	Finals series
2	Hawthorn (P)	22	17	5	0	2458	1746	140.8	68	Finals series
3	Geelong	22	17	5	0	2033	1787	113.8	68	Finals series
4	Fremantle	22	16	6	0	2029	1556	130.4	64	Finals series
5	Port Adelaide	22	14	8	0	2180	1678	129.9	56	Finals series
6	North Melbourne	22	14	8	0	2026	1731	117.0	56	Finals series
7	Essendon	22	12	9	1	1828	1719	106.3	50	Finals series
8	Richmond	22	12	10	0	1887	1784	105.8	48	Finals series
9	West Coast	22	11	11	0	2045	1750	116.9	44	
10	Adelaide	22	11	11	0	2175	1907	114.1	44	
11	Collingwood	22	11	11	0	1766	1876	94.1	44	
12	Gold Coast	22	10	12	0	1917	2045	93.7	40	
13	Carlton	22	7	14	1	1891	2107	89.7	30	
14	Western Bulldogs	22	7	15	0	1784	2177	81.9	28	
15	Brisbane Lions	22	7	15	0	1532	2212	69.3	28	
16	Greater Western Sydney	22	6	16	0	1780	2320	76.7	24	
17	Melbourne	22	4	18	0	1336	1954	68.4	16	
18	St Kilda	22	4	18	0	1480	2436	60.8	16	

Source: AFL Tables
Rules for classification: 1) points; 2) percentage; 3) number of points for.
(P) Premiers

== Team awards and records ==
Season records

- Sydney broke the 40,000 members milestone for the first time.
- Between Round 5 and Round 17 the Swans record 12 wins in a row, equaling the club record last set in 1935.
- Sydney's score of 19.22 (136) in the Preliminary Final broke the club record for biggest score in a final.
- Sydney's winning margin of 71 points in the Preliminary Final broke the club record for biggest victory in a final.

== Individual awards and records ==
=== Bob Skilton Medal ===
Bob Skilton Medal
Rank	Player	Votes
1	Luke Parker	758
2	Josh Kennedy	709
3	Lance Franklin	688
4	Kieren Jack	663
5	Jarrad McVeigh	624
6	Nick Malceski	576
7	Ben McGlynn	575
8	Nick Smith	568
9	Dane Rampe	548
10	Harry Cunningham	520

Rising Star Award - Harry Cunningham

Dennis Carroll Trophy for Most Improved Player – Ben McGlynn

Barry Round Shield for Best Clubman – Jarrad McVeigh

Paul Kelly Players’ Player – Luke Parker

Paul Roos Award for Best Player in a Finals Series – Lance Franklin

=== Coleman Medal ===
Lance Franklin won the 2014 Coleman medal with 67 goals, from Jay Schulz with 64 goals.

=== Milestones ===
- Round 1 - Rhyce Shaw (100 club games)
- Round 2 - Nick Smith (100 career games), Josh Kennedy (100 club games)
- Round 7 - Rhyce Shaw (200 career games), Tom Derickx (first goal), Jake Lloyd (first goal)
- Round 11 - Lance Franklin (600 career goals)
- Round 12 - Heath Grundy (150 career games)
- Round 13 - Kieren Jack (150 career games)
- Round 15 - Zak Jones (first goal)
- Round 16 - Adam Goodes (341 games, most by an Indigenous footballer)
- Round 21 - Lance Franklin (200 career games), Dean Towers (first goal)
- Round 23 - Lewis Jetta (100 career games)
- Preliminary Final - Adam Goodes (350 career games)
- Grand Final - Ben McGlynn (100 club games)

=== Debuts ===
- Round 1 - Lance Franklin (club debut), Jeremy Laidler (club debut)
- Round 2 - Tom Derickx (club debut)
- Round 5 - Jake Lloyd (debut)
- Round 14 - Zak Jones (debut)
- Round 17 - Dean Towers (debut)
- Round 19 - Tim Membrey (debut)

=== All-Australian Team ===
- Lance Franklin - Full-forward
- Josh Kennedy - Centre
- Nick Malceski - Half-back flank
- Nick Smith - Back pocket
- Luke Parker (nominated)

=== AFL Rising Star ===
The following Sydney players were nominated for the 2014 NAB AFL Rising Star award:

- Round 15 – Harry Cunningham (nominated)
- Round 21 – Jake Lloyd (nominated)

=== 22 Under 22 team ===
- Luke Parker - Wing

== Reserves results ==
=== Regular season ===
**Rd**	**Date and local time**	**Opponent**	**Scores** (Sydney's scores indicated in **bold**)			**Venue**	**Ladder** **position**
**Rd**	**Date and local time**	**Opponent**	Home	Away	Result	**Venue**	**Ladder** **position**
1	Sun, 30 March (3:15 pm)	Brisbane Lions	4.11 (35)	**12.17 (89)**	Won by 54 points	The Gabba (A)	**2nd**
2	Sun, 6 April (9:30 am)	UWS Giants	11.20 (86)	**12.6 (76)**	Lost by 10 points	Spotless Stadium (A)	**6th**
3	Sunday, 13 April (9:30 am)	Queanbeyan	**26.11 (167)**	3.12 (30)	Won by 137 points	Blacktown International Sportspark (H)	**4th**
4	Saturday, 19 April (1:00 pm)	Gold Coast	**19.17 (137)**	4.7 (31)	Won by 106 points	SCG (H)	**2nd**
5	Friday, 25 April (1:30 pm)	Brisbane Lions	6.14 (50)	**7.9 (51)**	Won by 1 point	Harrup Park (A)	**2nd**
6	Bye						**2nd**
7	Friday, 9 May (4:10 pm)	UWS Giants	**14.16 (100)**	3.7 (25)	Won by 75 points	ANZ Stadium (H)	**2nd**
8	Saturday, 17 May (12:00 pm)	Eastlake	3.7 (25)	**23.18 (156)**	Won by 131 points	Manuka Oval (A)	**2nd**
9	Bye						**2nd**
10	Saturday, 31 May (2:00 pm)	NT Thunder	**23.12 (150)**	12.11 (83)	Won by 67 points	Drummoyne Oval (H)	**1st**
11	Sunday, 8 June (11:30 am)	Gold Coast	9.12 (66)	**12.13 (85)**	Won by 19 points	Metricon Stadium (A)	**1st**
12	Saturday, 14 June (1:45 pm)	Sydney University	7.5 (47)	**9.13 (67)**	Won by 20 points	Blacktown International Sportspark (A)	**1st**
13	Saturday, 28 June (3:30 pm)	UWS Giants	**5.8 (38)**	10.21 (81)	Lost by 43 points	SCG (H)	**1st**
14	Sunday, 6 July (12:00 pm)	Ainslie	9.10 (64)	**10.10 (70)**	Won by 6 points	SCG (H)	**2nd**
15	Saturday, 12 July (12:00 pm)	Belconnen	6.11 (47)	**9.17 (71)**	Won by 24 points	SCG (H)	**2nd**
16	Bye						**2nd**
17	Saturday, 26 July (7:00 pm)	NT Thunder	**13.14 (82)**	8.11 (59)	Lost by 33 points	TIO Stadium (A)	**3rd**
18	Friday, 1 August (4:10 pm)	Brisbane Lions	**9.11 (65)**	4.14 (38)	Won by 27 points	SCG (H)	**4th**
19	Saturday, 9 August (4:10 pm)	Gold Coast	**13.14 (92)**	6.10 (46)	Won by 46 points	Blacktown International Sportspark (H)	**3rd**
20	Saturday, 16 August (10:05 am)	UWS Giants	**11.12 (78)**	11.11 (77)	Won by 1 point	SCG (H)	**3rd**
21	Sunday, 24 August (12:00 pm)	Sydney Hills Eagles	12.11 (83)	**18.9 (117)**	Won by 34 points	SCG (H)	**2nd**

=== Finals series ===
**Rd**	**Date and local time**	**Opponent**	**Scores** (Sydney's scores indicated in **bold**)			**Venue**
**Rd**	**Date and local time**	**Opponent**	Home	Away	Result	**Venue**
EF	Bye					
PF	Sun, 7 September (12:45 pm)	NT Thunder	**16.11 (107)**	6.9 (45)	Won by 62 points	Blacktown International Sportspark (H)
GF	Sat, 13 September (1:30 pm)	Aspley	15.12 (102)	**15.10 (100)**	Lost by 2 points	Graham Road Oval (A)

=== Ladder ===
2014 NEAFL Ladder
Pos	Team	Pld	W	L	D	PF	PA	PP	Pts
1	UWS Giants	18	15	3	0	2020	1097	184.1	60
**2**	Sydney	**18**	**15**	**3**	**0**	**1664**	**1006**	**165.4**	60
3	Northern Territory	18	15	3	0	1810	1397	129.6	60
4	Aspley (P)	18	13	5	0	1876	1117	167.9	52
5	Redland	18	13	5	0	1815	1438	126.2	52
6	Ainslie	18	12	6	0	1738	1353	128.5	48
7	Sydney University	18	10	8	0	1518	1495	101.5	40
8	Southport	18	8	10	0	1573	1266	124.2	32
9	Brisbane Lions	18	6	12	0	1432	1652	86.7	24
10	Sydney Hills	18	6	12	0	1371	1695	80.9	24
11	Belconnen	18	6	12	0	1279	1742	73.4	24
12	Queanbeyan	18	4	14	0	1329	1932	68.8	16
13	Eastlake	18	3	15	0	999	1931	51.7	12
14	Gold Coast Suns	18	0	18	0	954	2257	42.3	0

Source: Source
Rules for classification: 1) points; 2) percentage; 3) number of points for.
(P) Premiers
