= Megan Blake Irwin =

Australian model

- Born: July 9, 1992 (age 33); Adelaide, Australia
- Occupation: Model
- Agent: IMG Models

Megan Blake Irwin (Born July 9, 1992) is an Australian model.

Irwin was born in Adelaide, Australia and was discovered at age 14 by Pride Models. Both her mother and her sister modeled and she followed in their footsteps.

Irwin appeared in Mario Testino's guest-edited Vogue Australia issue when he hand picked her after a chance meeting at a bar in Sydney. Irwin was the muse in the Seduce x Disney collaboration, Alice in Wonderland, photographed by Margaret Zhang.

Irwin has modelled for Harper's Bazaar Singapore, Vogue Australia and Vogue Japan, Guess, David Jones, Kookai, GQ Magazine, Trussardi and Seafolly.

In 2015 and 2017 she walked in the Adelaide Fashion Festival for Paolo Sebastian and David Jones respectively.

== Personal life ==
In early 2017, Irwin dated Australian AFL player and model Tom Derickx and confirmed to Adelaide Confidential in September 2017 that she was dating businessman Nicolo Knows. In 2018, she dated billionaire David Mimran who was 22 years her senior after meeting at the Cannes Film Festival.

Irwin has an on again off again relationship with Scott Disick which started in 2016 and picked up again briefly in 2020. Skeet Ulrich dated Irwin for three months in 2020.

Irwin lives in New York City.
