= Shaun Edwards (Australian footballer) =

Australian rules footballer (born 1993)

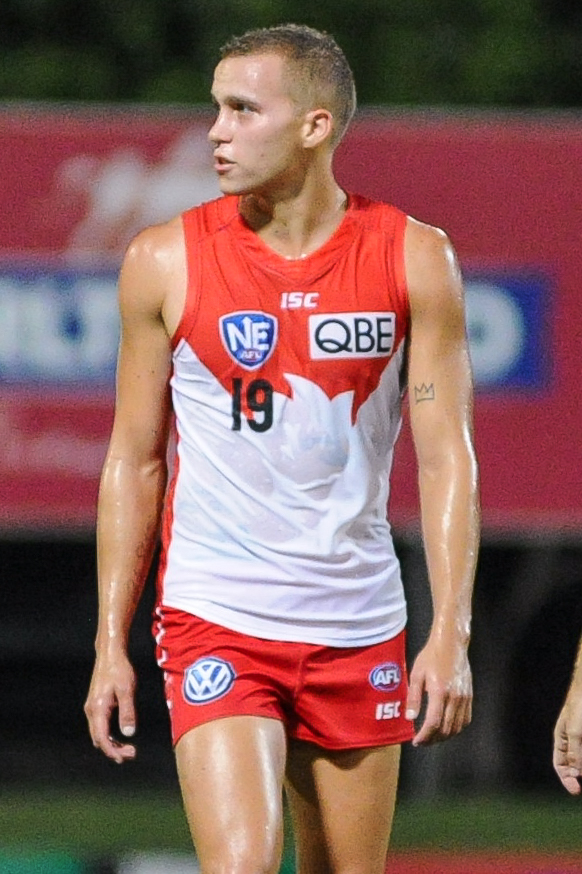
- Edwards in April 2017

Personal information
- Full name: Shaun Edwards
- Born: 13 December 1993 (age 32)
- Original team: St Mary's (NTFL)
- Height: 190 cm (6 ft 3 in)
- Weight: 84 kg (185 lb)
- Position: Forward / midfielder

Playing career^{1}
Years	Club	Games (Goals)
2012–2013	Greater Western Sydney	12 (2)
2014–2016	Essendon	12 (8)
2017	Sydney	0 (0)
Total		24 (10)
- ^{1} Playing statistics correct to the end of 2017.

Shaun Edwards (born 13 December 1993) is a former professional Australian rules footballer who played for the Greater Western Sydney Giants and Essendon Football Club in the Australian Football League (AFL).

== AFL career ==
Edwards was drafted by Greater Western Sydney in 2011, where he played his debut year in the NEAFL before they moved into the AFL, his first NEAFL match was against the Northern Territory Thunder at TIO Stadium. He made his AFL debut against Adelaide at AAMI Stadium in round 4, 2012. In October 2013, he was traded to Essendon for pick 48, in a deal that also saw Kurt Aylett arrive at Essendon. Edwards played the 2014 season in the Essendon VFL team before breaking into the senior team in round 11 of the 2015 season. Edwards won the Bill Hutchinson Community Award at the 2016 Crichton Medal presentations.

At the conclusion of the 2016 season, despite strong performances in the VFL, Edwards was delisted by Essendon. He was subsequently drafted by Sydney in the 2017 rookie draft. After failing to play a match during the 2017 season, he retired from AFL football at the conclusion of the season to focus on Indigenous education in Australia and around the world.

== House of Darwin ==
After his AFL career, Edwards formed fashion label House of Darwin. The brand draws inspiration from Darwin and the Northern Territory, blending vibrant, tropical influences with modern streetwear and high-fashion elements. House of Darwin has gained recognition for its bold prints, sustainable practices, and collaborations with artists and designers. The brand aims to promote a distinctive Australian identity and culture through its apparel and accessories, establishing itself as a prominent name in the contemporary fashion scene.

== Statistics ==
Statistics are correct to the end of the 2017 season

Legend
G	Goals	K	Kicks	D	Disposals	T	Tackles
B	Behinds	H	Handballs	M	Marks

Season	Team	No.	Games	Totals							Averages (per game)						
Season	Team	No.	Games	G	B	K	H	D	M	T	G	B	K	H	D	M	T
2012	Greater Western Sydney	22	10	2	4	91	41	132	31	11	0.2	0.4	9.1	4.1	13.2	3.1	1.1
2013	Greater Western Sydney	22	2	0	1	10	15	25	6	2	0.0	0.5	5.0	7.5	12.5	3.0	1.0
2014	Essendon	19	0	—	—	—	—	—	—	—	—	—	—	—	—	—	—
2015	Essendon	19	9	8	6	62	28	90	21	19	0.9	0.7	6.9	3.1	10.0	2.3	2.1
2016	Essendon	19	3	0	1	33	16	49	7	5	0.0	0.3	11.0	5.3	16.3	2.3	1.7
2017	Sydney	19	0	—	—	—	—	—	—	—	—	—	—	—	—	—	—
Career			24	10	12	196	100	296	65	37	0.4	0.5	8.2	4.2	12.3	2.7	1.5
