= Jack Hiscox =

Australian rules footballer

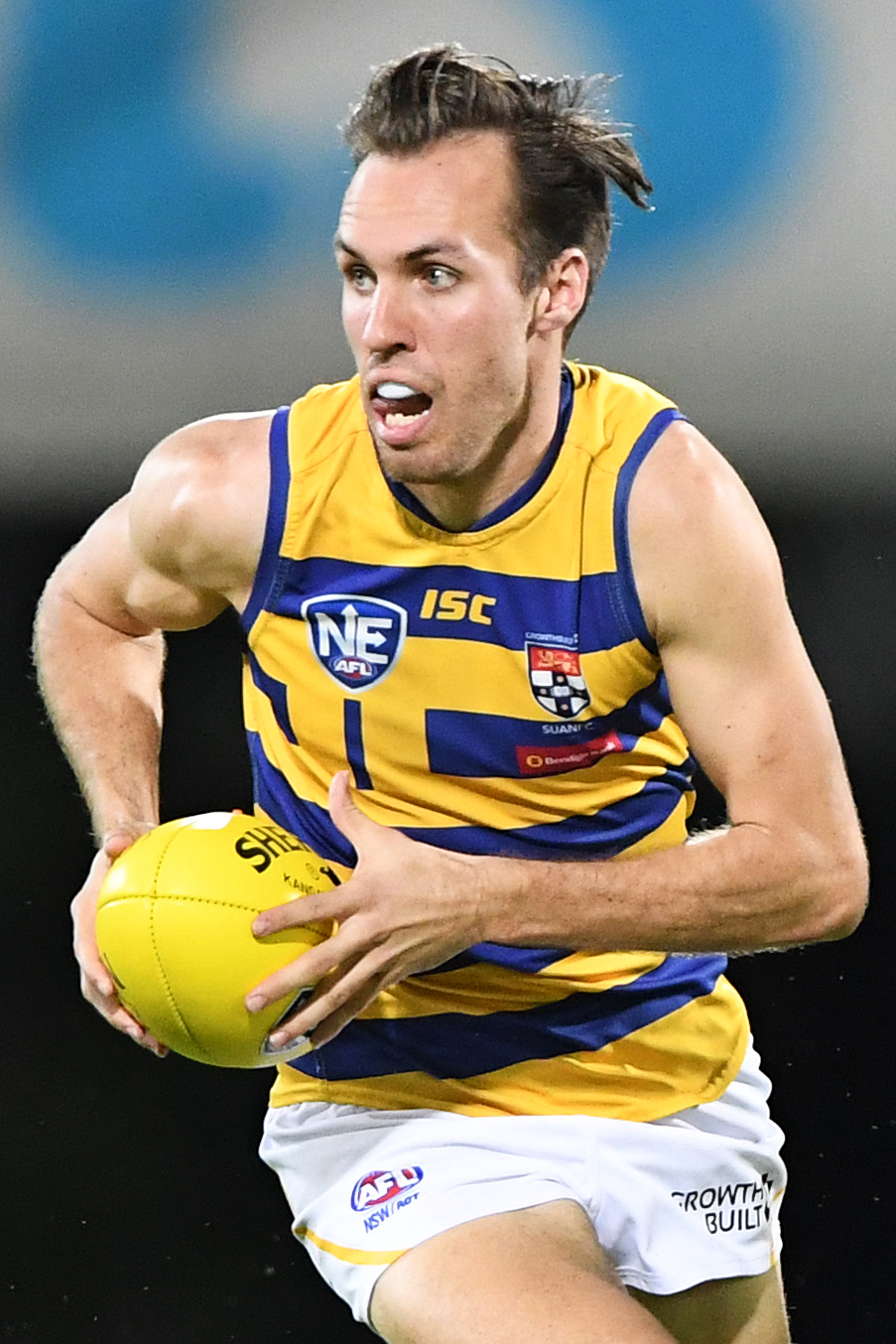
- Hiscox in August 2019

Personal information
- Full name: Jack Hiscox
- Born: 23 March 1995 (age 31)
- Original team: Sydney University (NEAFL)
- Draft: No. 38, 2014 national draft
- Debut: Round 8, 2016, Sydney vs. Richmond, at MCG
- Height: 184 cm (6 ft 0 in)
- Weight: 74 kg (163 lb)
- Position: Midfielder / forward

Playing career^{1}
Years	Club	Games (Goals)
2015–2016	Sydney	1 (0)
- ^{1} Playing statistics correct to the end of 2016.

Jack Hiscox (born 23 March 1995) is a former professional Australian rules footballer who played for the Sydney Swans in the Australian Football League (AFL). He was drafted by the Sydney Swans with their third selection and thirty-eighth overall in the 2014 national draft. He made his debut in the one point loss against Richmond in round 8, 2016 at the Melbourne Cricket Ground. At the conclusion of the 2016 season, he was delisted by Sydney.

Hiscox attended Newington College, completing his HSC in 2012. At Newington he was a star middle-distance athlete, winning the Ellison Stewart Cup for 800 and 1500m running.
