= Callum Sinclair =

Australian rules footballer (born 1989)

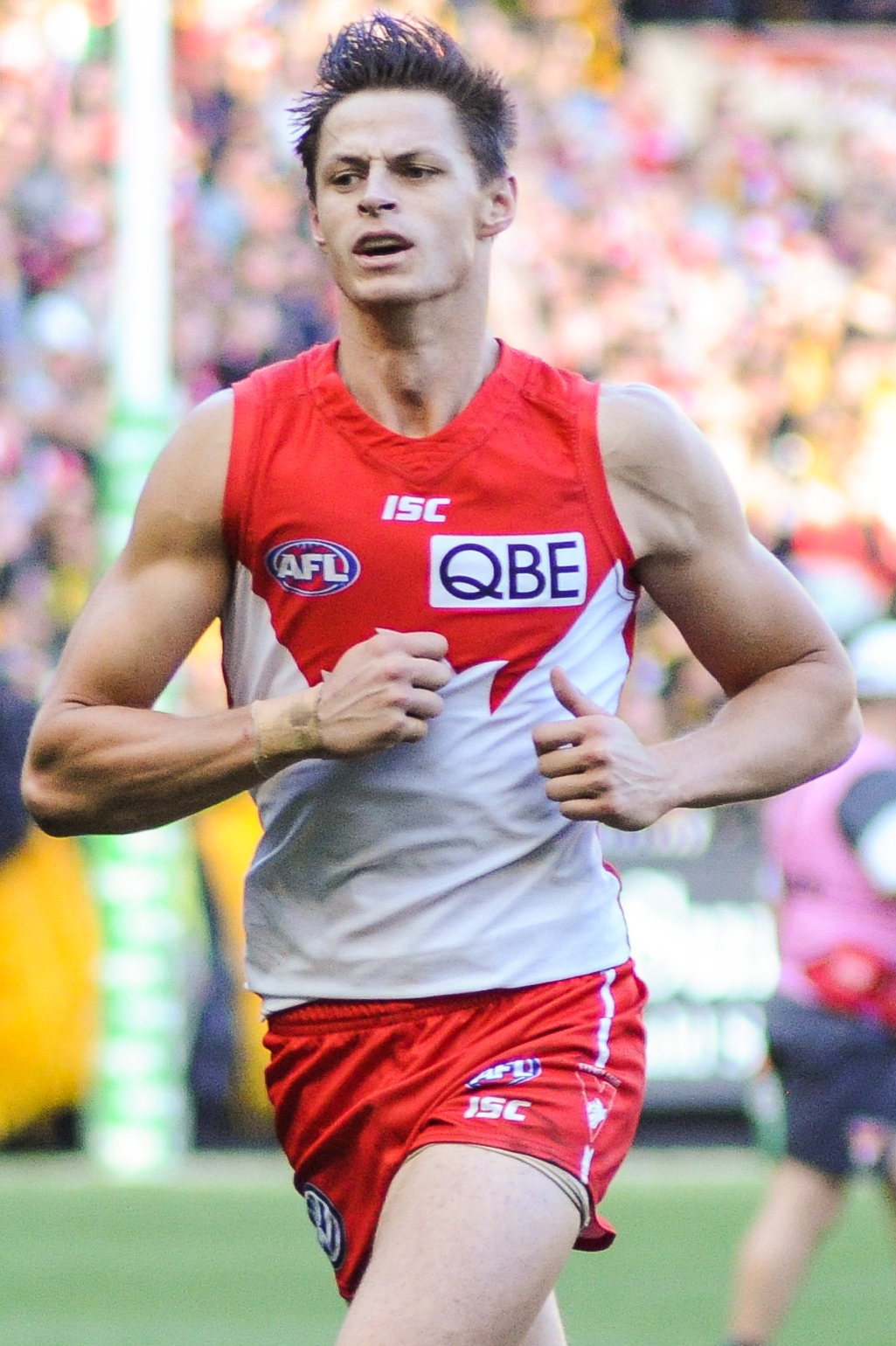
- Sinclair playing for Sydney in June 2017

Personal information
- Full name: Callum Sinclair
- Born: 23 September 1989 (age 37)
- Original team: Subiaco (WAFL)
- Draft: No. 12, 2013 Rookie Draft, West Coast
- Height: 200 cm (6 ft 7 in)
- Weight: 99 kg (218 lb)
- Position: Ruckman

Club information
- Current club: Sydney
- Number: 18

Playing career^{1}
Years	Club	Games (Goals)
2013–2015	West Coast	29 (18)
2016–2022	Sydney	89 (45)
Total		118 (63)
- ^{1} Playing statistics correct to the end of round 23, 2022.

Callum Sinclair (born 23 September 1989) is a former professional Australian rules footballer who played for the Sydney Swans and West Coast Eagles in the Australian Football League (AFL). He was recruited by the West Coast Eagles with the 12th pick in the 2013 rookie draft. He made his debut in round 2, 2013, against Hawthorn at Patersons Stadium.

== Early life ==
Originally from Melbourne, Sinclair participated in the Auskick program at Elsternwick, Victoria and played for Port Melbourne Football Club in the Victorian Football League (VFL) before moving to Western Australia to play for Subiaco in the West Australian Football League (WAFL). His father Allan played for Fitzroy and St Kilda in the 1970s. Callum went to school at Caulfield Grammar School and played in their 2007 APS Premiership team as a Full Forward. He played most junior football with Beaumaris Football Club. He also played for Old Caulfield Grammarians in VAFA and got selected for State Under 19 Football in 2008.

In 2010 his first season at Port Melbourne he was selected in the VFL team of the year Centre Half Forward. He missed selection in two AFL Drafts and left for WA in 2012 to play with Subiaco in the WAFL and made selection as Centre Half Forward for the WA State team. Injury interrupted his season however he played enough to get selected in the 2013 AFL draft.

== AFL career ==
Sinclair was drafted by the West Coast Eagles and made his AFL debut in round 2, 2013 against eventual premiers, Hawthorn Football Club. He played 5 consecutive games before his season was interrupted by injury. He returned to senior football in 2014, playing the first 3 rounds as a forward/ruck. He returned to the side, playing one more senior game for the season in round 17 against the Brisbane Lions.

In 2015, he missed the first 4 games of the season due to a fractured thumb, before returning to the side after 2 WAFL games. He missed just 2 more games for the rest of the season, playing 17 home and away games and 3 finals as a forward/ruck. He was selected in the 2015 AFL Grand Final against Hawthorn, playing in a losing team going down by 46 points. Following the Grand Final, he requested a trade to the Sydney Swans in a straight swap long term deal for the out-of-contract premiership player, Lewis Jetta.

Sinclair played 89 senior matches for the Sydney Swans and 29 games for the West Coast Eagles and kicked 63 goals, polled 9 Brownlow votes and finished his career at the end of season 2022.

== Statistics ==
Updated to the end of round 23, 2022.

Legend
G	Goals	K	Kicks	D	Disposals	T	Tackles
B	Behinds	H	Handballs	M	Marks	H/O	Hit-outs

Season	Team	No.	Games	Totals								Averages (per game)								Votes
Season	Team	No.	Games	G	B	K	H	D	M	T	H/O	G	B	K	H	D	M	T	H/O	Votes
2013	West Coast	22	5	3	5	30	19	49	21	6	47	0.6	1	6	3.8	9.8	4.2	1.2	9.4	0
2014	West Coast	22	4	2	3	24	16	40	8	6	35	0.5	0.8	6	4	10	2	1.5	8.8	0
2015	West Coast	22	20	13	10	134	111	245	83	32	369	0.7	0.5	6.5	5.6	12.3	4.2	1.6	18.5	0
2016	Sydney	18	16	10	6	87	70	157	45	49	221	0.6	0.4	5.4	4.4	9.8	2.8	3.1	13.8	0
2017	Sydney	18	19	14	9	136	92	228	61	53	337	0.7	0.5	7.2	4.8	12.0	3.2	2.8	17.7	3
2018	Sydney	18	23	12	8	216	120	336	86	70	667	0.5	0.3	9.4	5.2	14.6	3.7	3.0	29.0	6
2019	Sydney	18	14	5	2	106	62	168	38	44	350	0.4	0.1	7.6	4.4	12.0	2.7	3.1	25.0	0
2020 (Note: The 2020 season was played with 17 home-and-away matches per team (down from 22) and 16-minute quarters with time on (down from 20-minute quarters with time on) due to the impact of the COVID-19 pandemic.)	Sydney	18	13	3	3	64	55	119	32	33	293	0.2	0.2	4.9	4.2	9.2	2.5	2.5	22.5	0
2021	Sydney	18	4	1	0	19	21	40	10	11	99	0.3	0.0	4.8	5.3	10.0	2.5	2.8	24.8	0
2022	Sydney	18	0	–	–	–	–	–	–	–	–	–	–	–	–	–	–	–	–	–
Career			118	63	46	816	566	1382	384	304	2418	0.5	0.4	6.9	4.8	11.7	3.3	2.6	20.5	9

== See also ==
- List of Caulfield Grammar School people
