= James Rose (footballer) =

Australian rules footballer (born 1996)

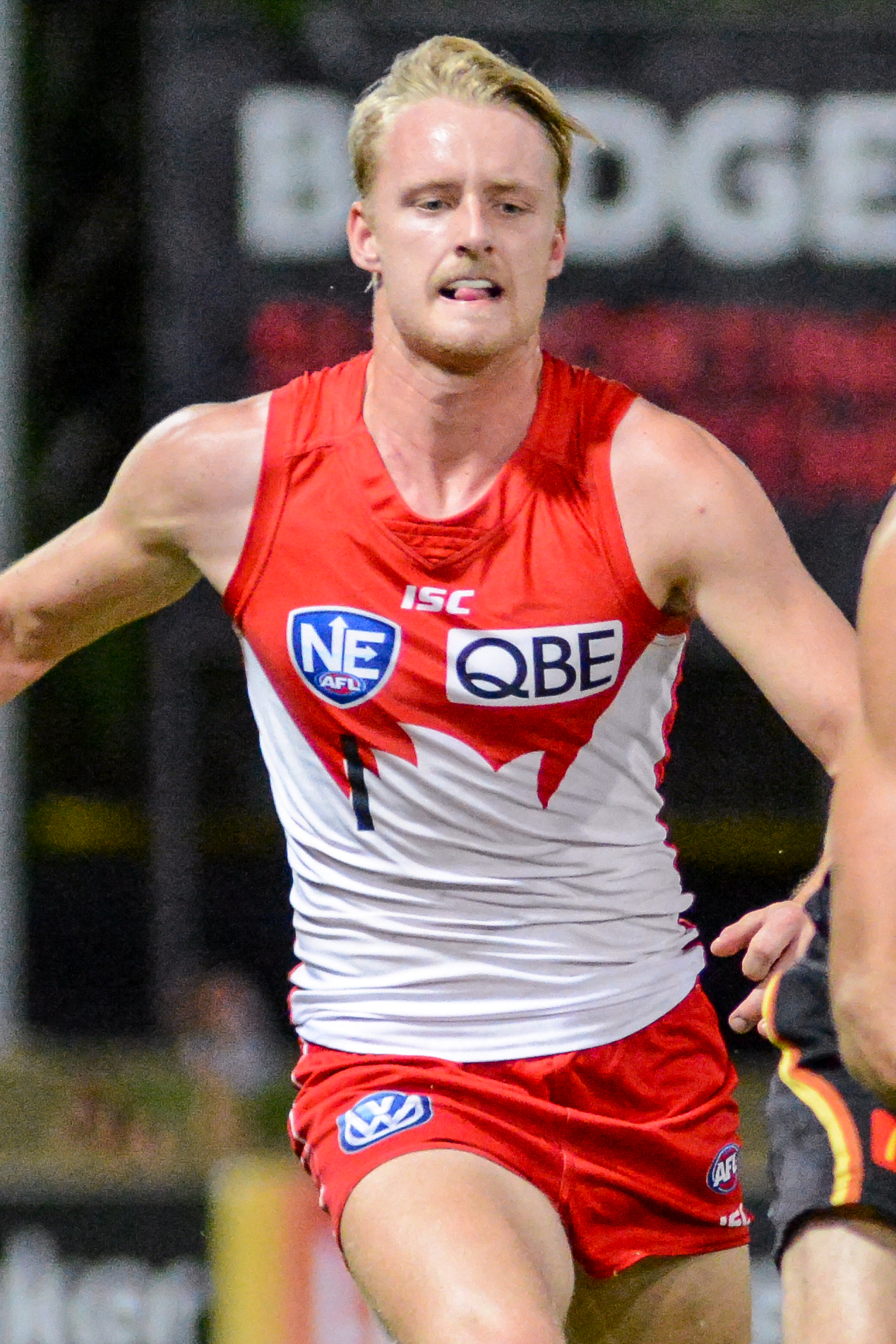
- Rose in August 2016

Personal information
- Full name: James Rose
- Born: 16 April 1996 (age 30)
- Original teams: Sturt Football Club, (SANFL)
- Draft: No. 37, 2014 national draft
- Height: 187 cm (6 ft 2 in)
- Weight: 87 kg (192 lb)

Playing career^{1}
Years	Club	Games (Goals)
2015–2019	Sydney	14 (7)
- ^{1} Playing statistics correct to the end of 2019.

James Rose (born 16 April 1996) is a professional Australian rules footballer who played for the Sydney Swans in the Australian Football League (AFL). He was recruited from the Sturt Football Club in the South Australian National Football League with the thirty-seventh selection in the 2014 national draft. He was delisted at the conclusion of the 2019 AFL season.

Rose made his debut in round 21, 2015, against Greater Western Sydney in the eighth edition of the Sydney Derby. After coming on as the substitute in the fourth quarter, Rose kicked three goals as the Swans won by 89 points. He then played his second game, and his first finals match, in the Swans' semi-final loss to North Melbourne a month later. He wore guernsey number 1, a number previously donned by past club legends such as Paul Roos and Barry Hall.

In January 2016, Rose signed on with the Swans for a further two seasons. He was selected for his first game of the year in round 11 against Gold Coast where he kicked a goal. He also kicked a goal the following week, and was named in the best in the loss to Greater Western Sydney.
