= Tom Derickx =

Australian model and Australian rules footballer

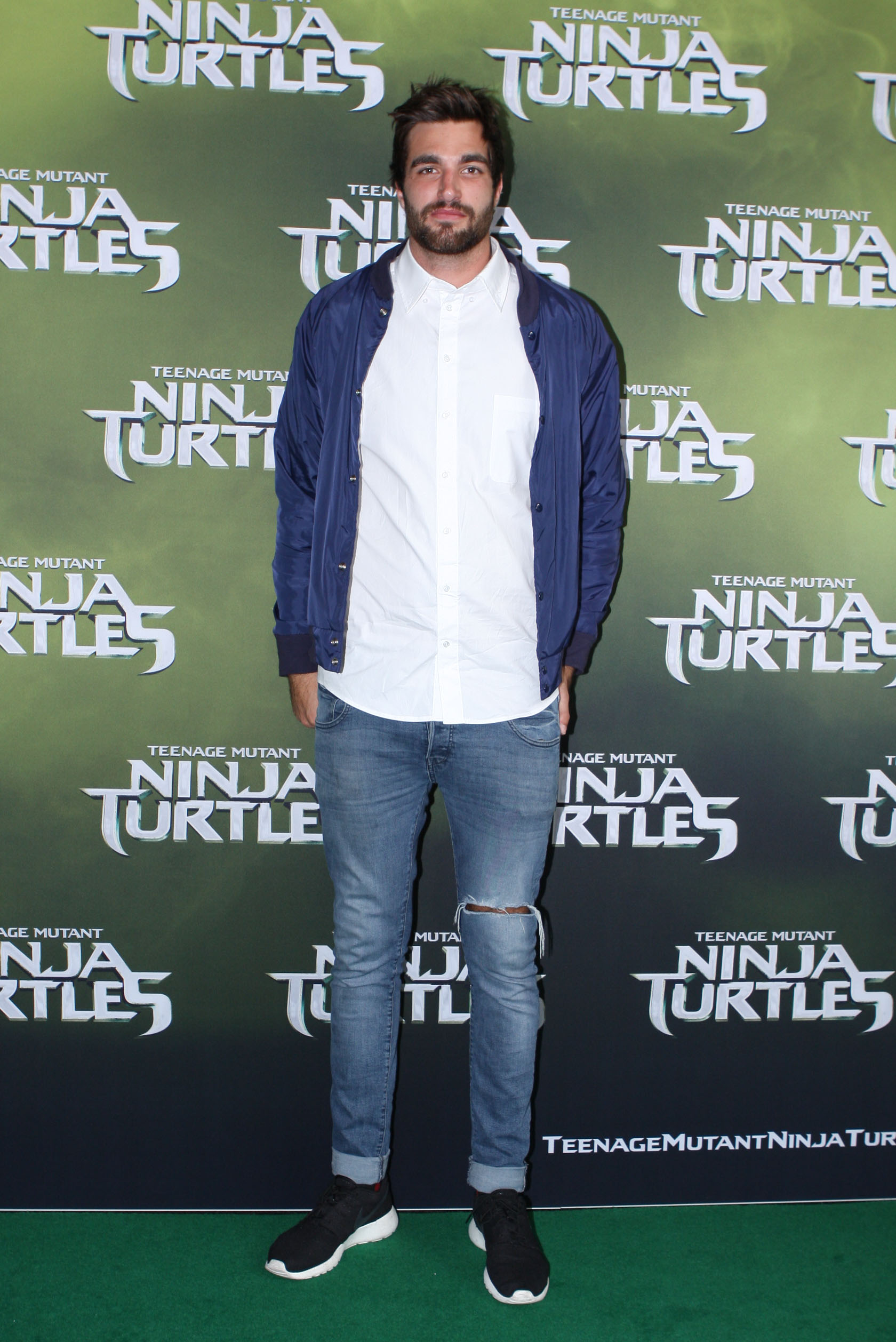

Personal information
- Full name: Thomas William Anton Derickx
- Born: 7 December 1987 (age 38)
- Original team: Claremont (WAFL)
- Draft: No. 63 2010: Richmond
- Height: 201 cm (6 ft 7 in)
- Weight: 99 kg (218 lb)
- Position: Forward / ruck

Playing career^{1}
Years	Club	Games (Goals)
2011–2013	Richmond	2 (0)
2014–2016	Sydney	13 (6)
Total		15 (6)
- ^{1} Playing statistics correct to the end of 2016.

Thomas William Anton Derickx (born 7 December 1987) is a model, musician and a former professional Australian rules footballer who played for the Richmond Football Club and Sydney Swans in the Australian Football League (AFL).

== Early life ==
Derickx is originally from Dunsborough in Western Australia's south-west. Derickx grew up playing Australian Rules Football but it wasn't his passion. He spent a lot of time surfing and began playing guitar during high school. Before joining the AFL, Derickx pursued a career as a carpenter.

His father sells animal health products to farmers.

== Career ==
Derickx was drafted to Richmond with the 63rd selection in 2010 AFL draft from the Claremont Football Club in the WAFL. At the completion of the 2013 season, Derickx was delisted by Richmond. However, he was later signed by the Sydney Swans as a delisted free agent. Derickx made his Swans debut in Round 2, 2014 against Collingwood. Derickx's biggest battle came in Round 8, 2014 when the Swans played Hawthorn where he rucked the whole game against Ben McEvoy and David Hale and was successful as the Swans got up by 19 points. After a successful first half of the year Derickx was dropped in favour of Mike Pyke for the remainder of the year. In 2015, he only played one game for Sydney, spending most of the season playing in the North East Australian Football League (NEAFL). He announced his retirement from the AFL at the conclusion of the 2016 season.

Since retiring from AFL, Derickx is a fashion model represented by IMG and is part of the dance band Kayex. He has modeled for brands including Tiffany & Co., Diesel and Jockey Underwear.

He is currently studying music composition and production, and released his first solo single "Horror Show" In October 2021.

== Personal life ==
Derickx is an ambassador for suicide prevention charity RUOK? and often discusses his struggles with depression and toxic masculinity to raise awareness.

In 2017, Derickx dated model Megan Blake Irwin.

Derickx resides in Sydney.
