= Xavier Richards =

Australian rules footballer

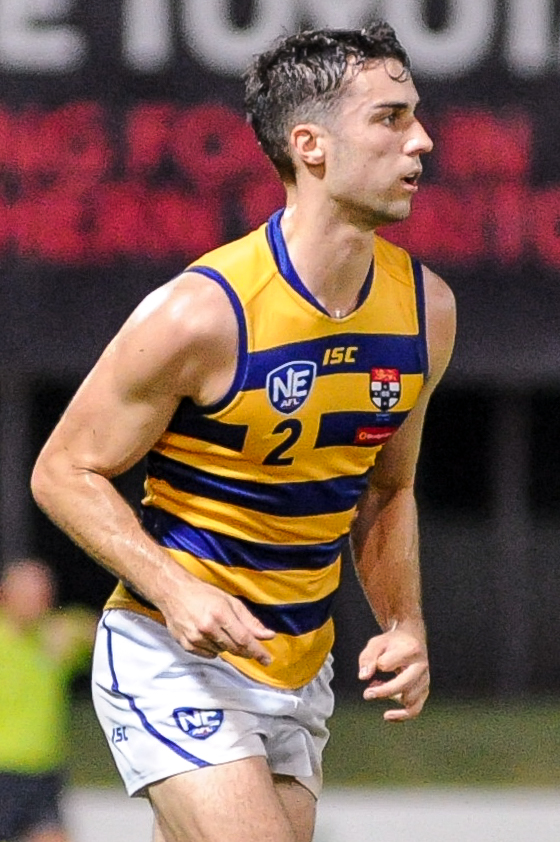
- Richards playing for Sydney University in June 2017

Personal information
- Full name: Xavier Richards
- Born: 25 April 1993 (age 33)
- Original team: Sandringham Dragons (TAC Cup)/Xavier College
- Draft: No. 29, 2013 rookie draft
- Height: 195 cm (6 ft 5 in)
- Weight: 91 kg (201 lb)
- Position: Forward / defender

Playing career^{1}
Years	Club	Games (Goals)
2013–2016	Sydney	12 (13)
- ^{1} Playing statistics correct to the end of 2016.

Xavier Richards (born 25 April 1993) is a former professional Australian rules footballer who played for the Sydney Swans in the Australian Football League (AFL).

Richards played for the East Sandringham Junior Club, he went on to play for the Sandringham Dragons in the TAC Cup and Vic Metro at the AFL Under 18 Championships. His older brother Ted Richards also played for the Sydney Swans.

He made his senior debut against Carlton in round 14 of the 2013 AFL season as a late replacement for Mitch Morton, who withdrew from the side due to injury.

At the conclusion of 2016 season, he requested a trade from the Swans after failing to agree to terms for a new contract. However, he was unable to find a club during the trade period and was subsequently delisted by the club less than four weeks after appearing in the 2016 AFL Grand Final. He nominated for the AFL draft, but was not selected by any club.

== Statistics ==
Legend
G	Goals	K	Kicks	D	Disposals	T	Tackles
B	Behinds	H	Handballs	M	Marks

Season	Team	No.	Games	Totals							Averages (per game)						
Season	Team	No.	Games	G	B	K	H	D	M	T	G	B	K	H	D	M	T
2013	Sydney	42	1	0	0	1	0	1	0	0	0.0	0.0	1.0	0.0	1.0	0.0	0.0
2014	Sydney	42	0	—	—	—	—	—	—	—	—	—	—	—	—	—	—
2015	Sydney	42	1	0	0	6	4	10	4	4	0.0	0.0	6.0	4.0	10.0	4.0	4.0
2016	Sydney	42	10	13	7	79	51	130	55	18	1.3	0.7	7.9	5.1	13.0	5.5	1.8
Career			12	13	7	86	55	141	59	22	1.1	0.6	7.2	4.6	11.8	4.9	1.8
