= Alex Johnson (Australian footballer) =

Australian rules football player (born 1992)

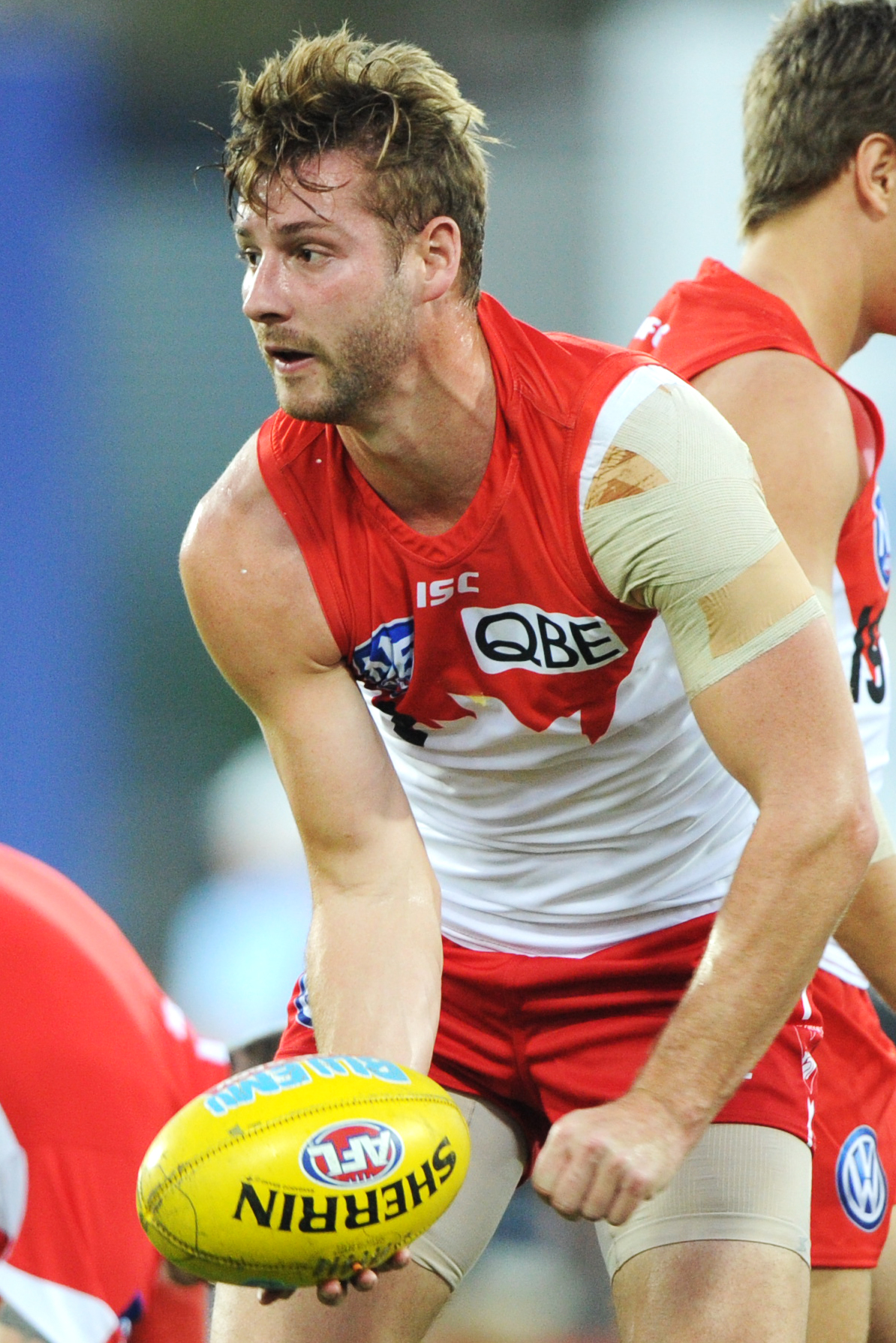
- Johnson playing for Sydney in July 2018

Personal information
- Full name: Alex Johnson
- Born: 2 March 1992 (age 34)
- Original team: Oakleigh Chargers (TAC Cup)
- Draft: No. 57, 2010 national draft
- Height: 193 cm (6 ft 4 in)
- Weight: 84 kg (185 lb)
- Position: Half-back flank

Playing career^{1}
Years	Club	Games (Goals)
2011–2018	Sydney	47 (1)
- ^{1} Playing statistics correct to the end of 2018.

Career highlights
- Sydney premiership player 2012

Alex Johnson (born 2 March 1992) is a former professional Australian rules footballer who played for the Sydney Swans in the Australian Football League (AFL). He was part of Sydney's 2012 premiership team.

== Career ==
Originally from Victoria, and educated at Xavier College, Johnson played under-18s football for Oakleigh Chargers in the TAC Cup, serving as captain in his final season. He was drafted by the Sydney Swans in the No. 57 selection in the 2010 AFL Draft, and made his first appearance at the senior AFL level early in the 2011 AFL season, debuting in Round 3 against West Coast and maintaining his position for the entire year.

Playing as the third tall defender in the side, Johnson performed his role wonderfully well and exceeded all expectations of him set by the coaching staff, ably filling the role left by retiring champion Craig Bolton early in the year. His poise and strong one on one contesting were the standout features of his game throughout 2011 and he also improved his rebound and attacking play as the season wore on. Johnson went on to be a key player in the Sydney Swans' AFL premiership–winning side, playing every game in the regular season and the finals series. His ability to play as a key defender and professional approach to the game saw him awarded with the 2012 Swans Rising Star Award in what was his second season.

After the 2012 premiership, Johnson suffered repeated knee injuries and did not make another senior appearance for Sydney for almost six years. His run of injuries began when he tore his left anterior cruciate ligament (ACL) in Sydney's 2013 pre-season match against the Gold Coast Suns. He underwent two knee reconstructions during 2013—a traditional reconstruction in April and a LARS reconstruction in July. He returned to the field for the Sydney reserves in early 2014, but he tore the ligament again in his first game back. It was not until September 2016 that Johnson was even able to return to running laps after this second injury, as it took a further three reconstruction surgeries between 2014 and 2016 before his knee successfully healed due to various complications and infections. Johnson remained on the Sydney playing list through this time, and performed an assistant coaching role with the Sydney reserves; and, although delisted by Sydney at the conclusion of the 2016 season, he was re-drafted by the club as a rookie during the 2017 AFL rookie draft.

Johnson returned to the field for the Sydney reserves in the NEAFL in July 2017, his first competitive game at any level for more than three years after his previous game. He played the rest of the season in the NEAFL, before a groin injury over the 2017/18 offseason again delayed his return to senior football. Johnson finally returned to play his first senior AFL match since the 2012 AFL Grand Final in Round 20, 2018, against Collingwood, almost six years since his previous game. The following week against Melbourne, he suffered another knee injury, this time rupturing the ACL in his previously undamaged right knee, ending his season and career with the Swans. He was delisted by Sydney at the end of the 2018 season, having played just 47 games over eight years.

In 2019, Johnson returned to Melbourne and joined the Northern Blues in the Victorian Football League as a player and development coach. In the 2020 season, he signed for the old boys' club of his alma mater, Old Xaverians, but suffered yet another ACL injury in pre-season training shortly before the season was cancelled due to the COVID-19 pandemic.

== Statistics ==
Statistics are correct to the end of the 2016 season

Legend
G	Goals	K	Kicks	D	Disposals	T	Tackles
B	Behinds	H	Handballs	M	Marks

Season	Team	No.	Games	Totals							Averages (per game)						
Season	Team	No.	Games	G	B	K	H	D	M	T	G	B	K	H	D	M	T
2011	Sydney	34	20	1	0	190	77	267	89	34	0.1	0.0	9.5	3.9	13.4	4.5	1.7
2012	Sydney	34	25	0	4	209	142	351	108	65	0.0	0.2	8.4	5.7	14.0	4.3	2.6
2013	Sydney	34	0	—	—	—	—	—	—	—	—	—	—	—	—	—	—
2014	Sydney	34	0	—	—	—	—	—	—	—	—	—	—	—	—	—	—
2015	Sydney	34	0	—	—	—	—	—	—	—	—	—	—	—	—	—	—
2016	Sydney	2	0	—	—	—	—	—	—	—	—	—	—	—	—	—	—
2017	Sydney	2	0	—	—	—	—	—	—	—	—	—	—	—	—	—	—
2018	Sydney	2	2	0	0	12	7	19	12	5	0.0	0.0	6.0	3.5	9.5	6.0	2.5
Career			47	1	4	399	219	618	197	99	0.0	0.1	8.9	4.9	13.7	4.4	2.2
