= Heath Grundy =

Australian rules footballer (born 1986)

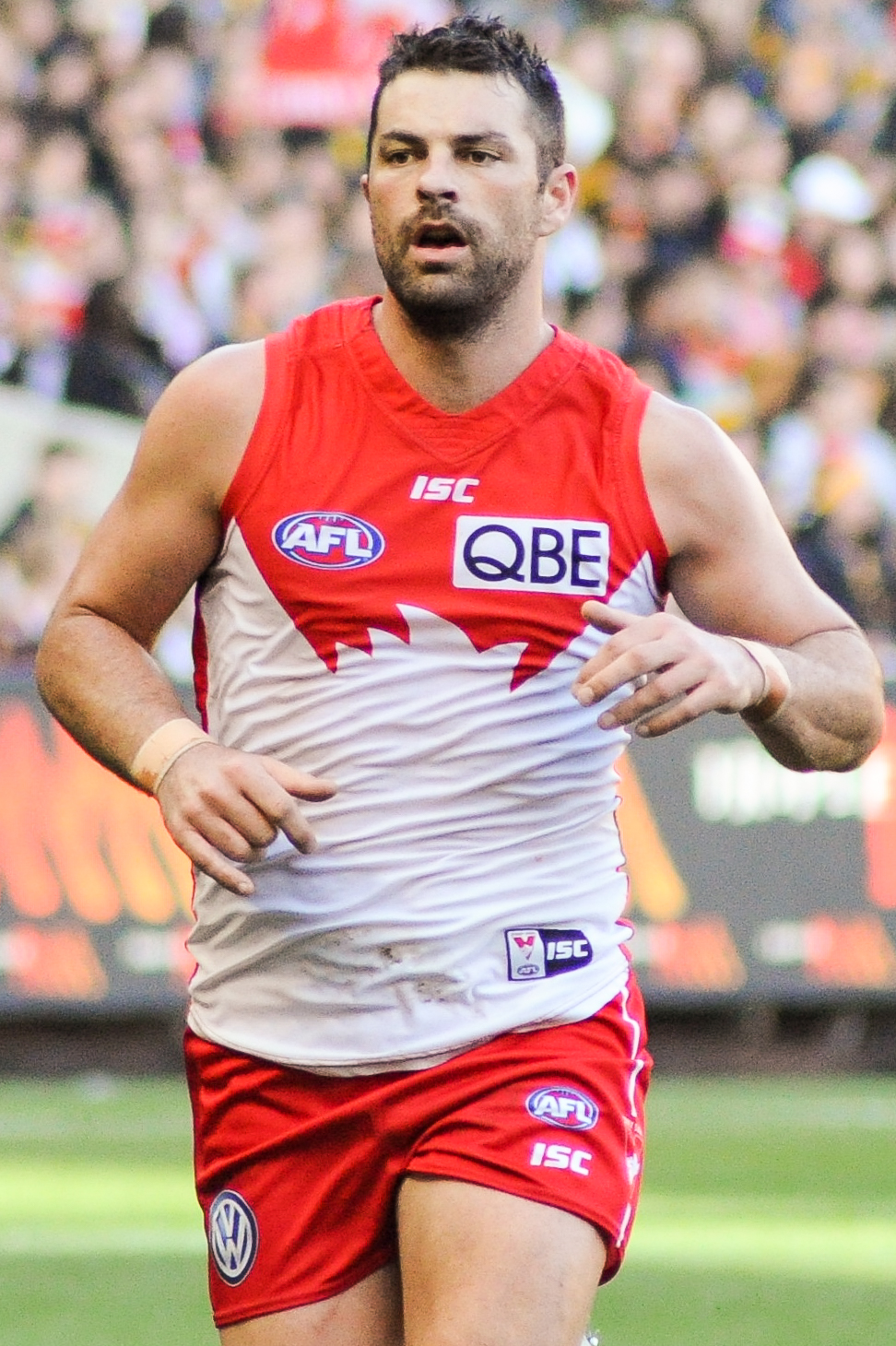
- Grundy playing for Sydney in June 2017

Personal information
- Full name: Heath Grundy
- Nickname: Reg
- Born: 2 June 1986 (age 40)
- Original team: Norwood (SANFL)
- Draft: No. 42, 2005 Rookie draft, Sydney
- Height: 192 cm (6 ft 4 in)
- Weight: 101 kg (223 lb)
- Position: Defender

Playing career^{1}
Years	Club	Games (Goals)
2005–2019	Sydney	256 (24)
- ^{1} Playing statistics correct to the end of 2019.

Career highlights
- Sydney premiership player 2012

Heath Grundy (born 2 June 1986) is a former Australian rules footballer who played for the Sydney Swans in the Australian Football League (AFL).

Nicknamed 'Reg' due to his namesake Reg Grundy, he was elevated from the Sydney Swans rookie list in 2005 after playing senior football with South Australian National Football League (SANFL) club Norwood and being an All-Australian under-18s player in 2004. He made an impressive senior debut in a Round 16, 2006, kicking three goals in a win against Richmond.

After his three-goal debut, Grundy was used predominantly in the forward line. After Grundy failed to convert his debut success on a consistent basis, Roos moved Grundy into defence where he has remained. It was not until 2009 that Grundy showed genuine promise as a defender. Grundy's ability to outmark his opponent (usually larger in weight and height) and find the ball more frequently, have been his most notable improvements.

In 2010, after Craig Bolton sustained a season-ending injury and then later on when Lewis Roberts-Thomson injured his hamstring, Grundy was called on by Roos to play on the competition's best forwards. He marked players including Nick Riewoldt, Matthew Pavlich, Jonathan Brown, Barry Hall and Lance Franklin. He finished 5th in the Bob Skilton Medal.

2011 was another fairly consistent year for Grundy. He formed a stable partnership with Ted Richards as the Swans' key position defenders and held down the centre half-back position with aplomb. He was forced out of the Swans' run into and through the finals due to contracting glandular fever late in the year.

== Statistics ==
Statistics are correct to the end of the 2016 season

Legend
G	Goals	K	Kicks	D	Disposals	T	Tackles
B	Behinds	H	Handballs	M	Marks

Season	Team	No.	Games	Totals							Averages (per game)						
Season	Team	No.	Games	G	B	K	H	D	M	T	G	B	K	H	D	M	T
2006	Sydney	39	6	9	3	34	11	45	21	4	1.5	0.5	5.7	1.8	7.5	3.5	0.7
2007	Sydney	39	8	1	1	29	22	51	21	11	0.1	0.1	3.6	2.8	6.4	2.6	1.4
2008	Sydney	39	10	2	0	68	70	138	49	16	0.2	0.0	6.8	7.0	13.8	4.9	1.6
2009	Sydney	39	22	6	4	181	163	344	126	43	0.3	0.2	8.2	7.4	15.6	5.7	2.0
2010	Sydney	39	24	0	1	287	199	486	158	47	0.0	0.0	12.0	8.3	20.3	6.6	2.0
2011	Sydney	39	20	1	0	250	136	386	110	32	0.1	0.0	12.5	6.8	19.3	5.5	1.6
2012	Sydney	39	24	2	0	258	166	424	117	25	0.1	0.0	10.8	6.9	17.7	4.9	1.0
2013	Sydney	39	25	1	1	198	200	398	97	38	0.0	0.0	7.9	8.0	15.9	3.9	1.5
2014	Sydney	39	25	1	0	224	195	419	117	48	0.0	0.0	9.0	7.8	16.8	4.7	1.9
2015	Sydney	39	23	0	0	228	196	424	135	31	0.0	0.0	9.9	8.5	18.4	5.9	1.3
2016	Sydney	39	26	0	0	264	161	425	126	49	0.0	0.0	10.2	6.2	16.3	4.8	1.9
Career			213	23	10	2021	1519	3540	1077	344	0.1	0.0	9.5	7.1	16.6	5.1	1.6
