= Dan Robinson (footballer) =

Australian rules footballer (born 1994)

Personal information
- Full name: Daniel Robinson
- Born: 3 July 1994 (age 32)
- Original team: NSW/ACT Rams/St Ignatius College, Riverview/Xavier College
- Draft: No. 51, 2013 rookie draft
- Height: 184 cm (6 ft 0 in)
- Weight: 80 kg (176 lb)
- Position: Midfielder

Playing career^{1}
Years	Club	Games (Goals)
2013–2018	Sydney	25 (6)
- ^{1} Playing statistics correct to the end of the 2018 season.

Daniel Robinson (born 3 July 1994) is a former professional Australian rules footballer who played for the Sydney Swans in the Australian Football League (AFL).

Robinson was a NSW Scholarship selection at #51 in the 2013 rookie draft and was elevated to the senior list prior to the 2015 season. He made his senior debut against Carlton in round 9. Robinson requested a trade away from Sydney during the 2017 trade period in search of more opportunity.

Robinson was delisted at the end of the 2018 season.
