= Dean Towers =

Australian rules footballer (born 1990)

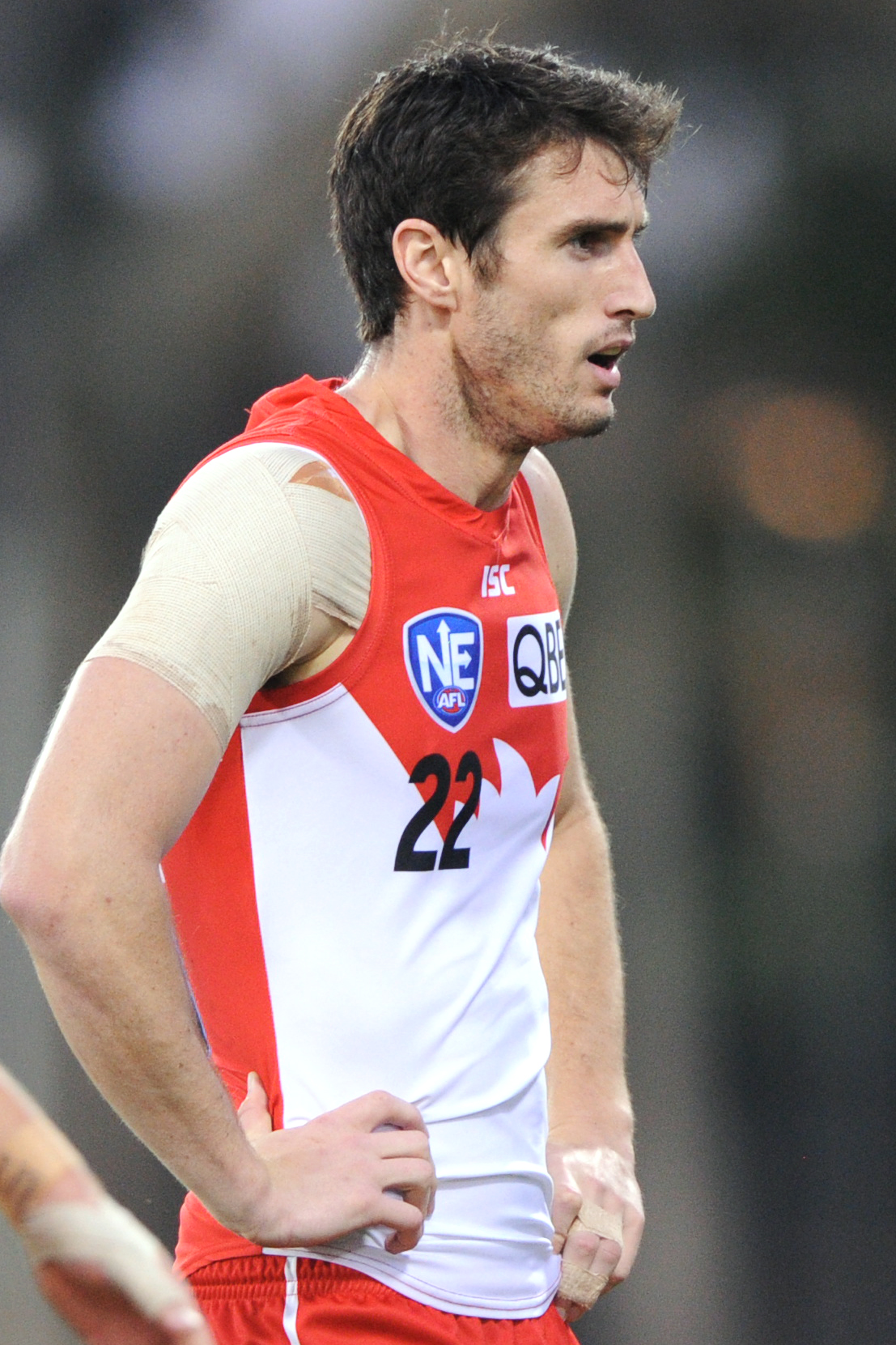
- Towers playing for Sydney in July 2018

Personal information
- Full name: Dean Neville Towers
- Nicknames: Beanie, Deano
- Born: 4 May 1990 (age 36)
- Original teams: Colac (GFL), Otway (CDFL)
- Draft: No. 22, 2012 National Draft, Sydney
- Height: 189 cm (6 ft 2 in)
- Weight: 87 kg (192 lb)

Playing career^{1}
Years	Club	Games (Goals)
2014–2018	Sydney	57 (31)
- ^{1} Playing statistics correct to the end of 2018.

Career highlights
- Fothergill–Round–Mitchell Medal: 2012

Dean Neville Towers (born 4 May 1990) is a former Australian rules footballer who played for the Sydney Swans in the Australian Football League (AFL).

== AFL career ==
Towers was drafted with the 22nd pick in 2012 AFL draft. He debuted in round 17, 2014 against the Carlton Football Club. and was delisted at the end of the 2018 AFL season.

In 2019, Towers became a player and head coach with the UNSW-Eastern Suburbs Bulldogs in the Sydney AFL competition.

== Personal life ==
Towers was born in Perth and spent his early years there before his family returned to Victoria. He grew up on a beef farm in Kawarren and attended Sacred Heart School and Elliminyt Primary School prior to spending his secondary schooling years at Colac Secondary College. He was a 3rd year undergraduate student in Physical Education (Teaching) at the University of Ballarat at the time he was drafted. He has two siblings, a brother Ryan and a sister Breanna. Towers' family were originally fans of Geelong Football Club but changed to following the Sydney Football Club when the Swans drafted Towers. Dean's brother Ryan quotes that "Yeah I'd say that we're converts now but I've still got a soft spot for Geelong."

In 2019, Towers was studying for a degree in Exercise Physiology at UNSW, with Towers completing his studies in 2022. He lives with his wife Jessica.
