= Harrison Marsh =

Australian rules footballer

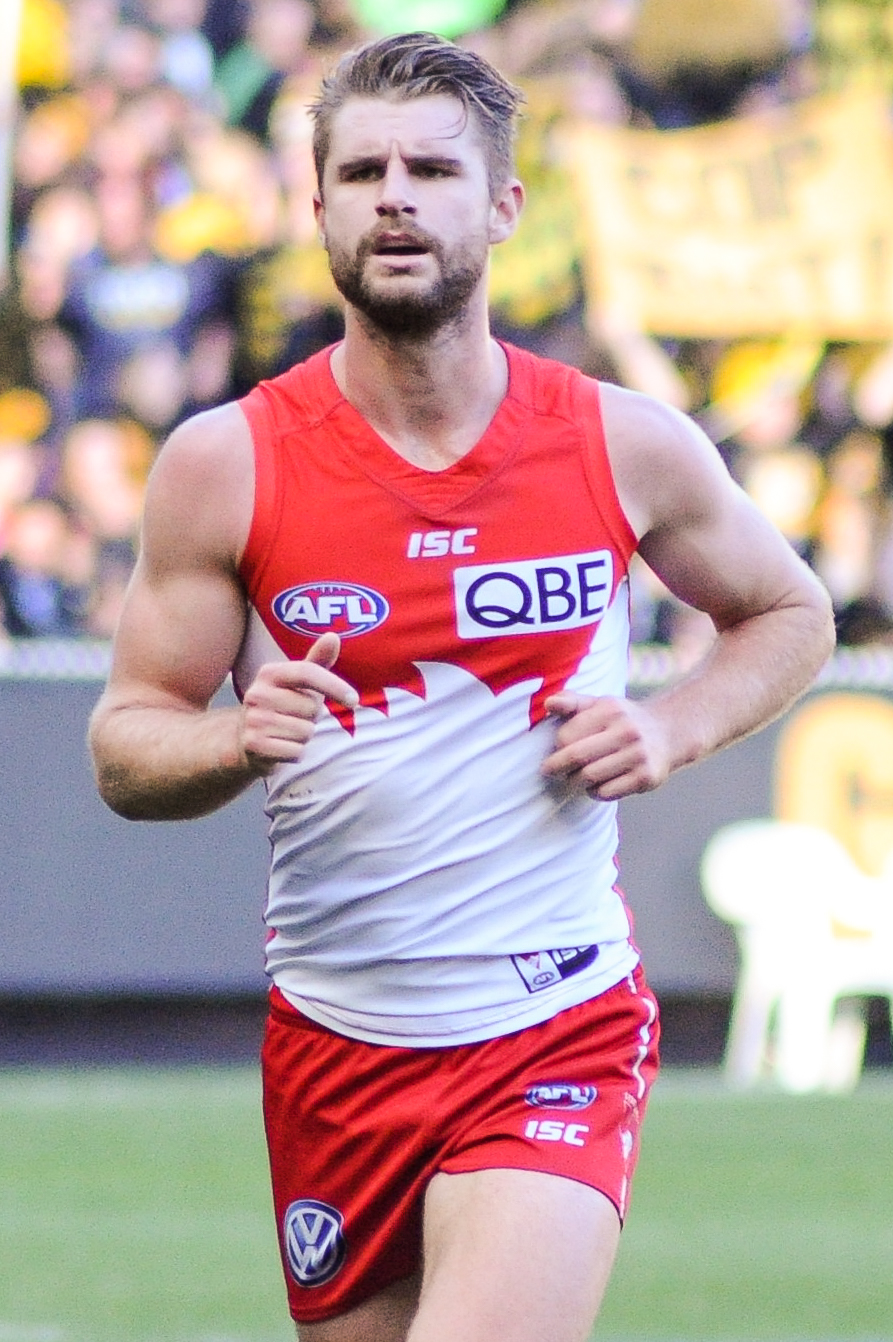
- Marsh playing for Sydney in June 2017

Personal information
- Full name: Harrison Marsh
- Born: 13 January 1994 (age 32)
- Original team: East Fremantle (WAFL)
- Draft: No. 44, 2012 national draft
- Debut: Round 10, 2016, Sydney vs. North Melbourne, at SCG
- Height: 189 cm (6 ft 2 in)
- Weight: 82 kg (181 lb)
- Position: Defender

Playing career^{1}
Years	Club	Games (Goals)
2013–2018	Sydney	25 (0)
2019–2022	Subiaco	50 (28)
2023–	East Fremantle	29 (15)
Total		79 (43)
- ^{1} Playing statistics correct to the end of round 2, 2025.

Career highlights
- WAFL premiership player: 2023

Harrison Marsh (born 13 January 1994) is a former professional Australian rules footballer who played for the Sydney Swans in the Australian Football League (AFL). Marsh currently plays for East Fremantle in the West Australian Football League. He was drafted by the Sydney Swans with their second selection and forty-fourth overall in the 2012 national draft. He was delisted at the conclusion of the 2015 season without playing an AFL match, he was however, re-drafted by Sydney as a rookie with the thirty-second pick in the 2016 rookie draft. He made his debut in the twenty-six point win against North Melbourne in round 10, 2016 at the Sydney Cricket Ground.

== Early life ==
Marsh is originally from Margaret River, Western Australia, 277 km south of Perth.

He is the oldest son of Kris Marsh, a policeman, and Melanie Marsh, née Sorrell. He has been playing football since he was about nine years old.

Marsh's maternal grandfather, Ray Sorrell, was a champion centreman for the East Fremantle team, based in Perth. Sorrell, who played midfield, was state captain, won Sandover Medals in 1961 and 1963, was named All-Australian in 1958 and 1961, and received two Simpson Medals for being best afield in a WAFL grand final. Marsh described his grandfather as "an absolute bull" and has said, "I'd love to be half as good as him."

In his early years, Marsh played six seasons for the Augusta-Margaret River Hawks, playing his last game for them in 2011. He then played at the colts level for East Fremantle and represented Western Australia in the under-18s carnival.

Marsh's younger brother Jonathon is also a football player who began playing for Collingwood in 2015.

== AFL career ==
Marsh, who is 189 cm tall and weighs 87 kg, has played for the Sydney Swans since 2013, after being selected with 44th pick in the 2012 NAB AFL draft.

He played for the reserve team, which plays in the North Eastern Australian Football League (NEAFL) from 2013 to 2015. In 2015, he was named in the League's "team of the year." He was delisted at the end of the 2015 season because it was felt that "his style of game was too 'safe,' that he needed to play with a bit more adventure." Consequently, Marsh had to undergo "a change of mindset." He was aided by player Rhyce Shaw, who "helped Marsh find the right balance between attack and defence."

He was then redrafted to the team through the rookie draft and named captain of the Swans' undefeated reserves team. In May 2016, he was moved up to the senior team. He was given guernsey number 31, a number previously worn by Brett Kirk, who retired in 2010. "It’s been a few years but I’m just so happy to finally do it," Marsh said just prior to his debut on the senior team. "It was pretty tough when I was delisted but the club kept me in the loop with what was going on. I continued to train at the club and I thought it could be worse and a lot can change in a year."

However, at the end of the 2018 season after only playing 25 games over three seasons, but including three finals in 2016, Marsh was again delisted.

He then returned to Western Australia to play for Subiaco. He was selected to represent Western Australia in the interstate match against South Australia in 2021.
