= Brandon Jack =

Australian rules footballer and journalist

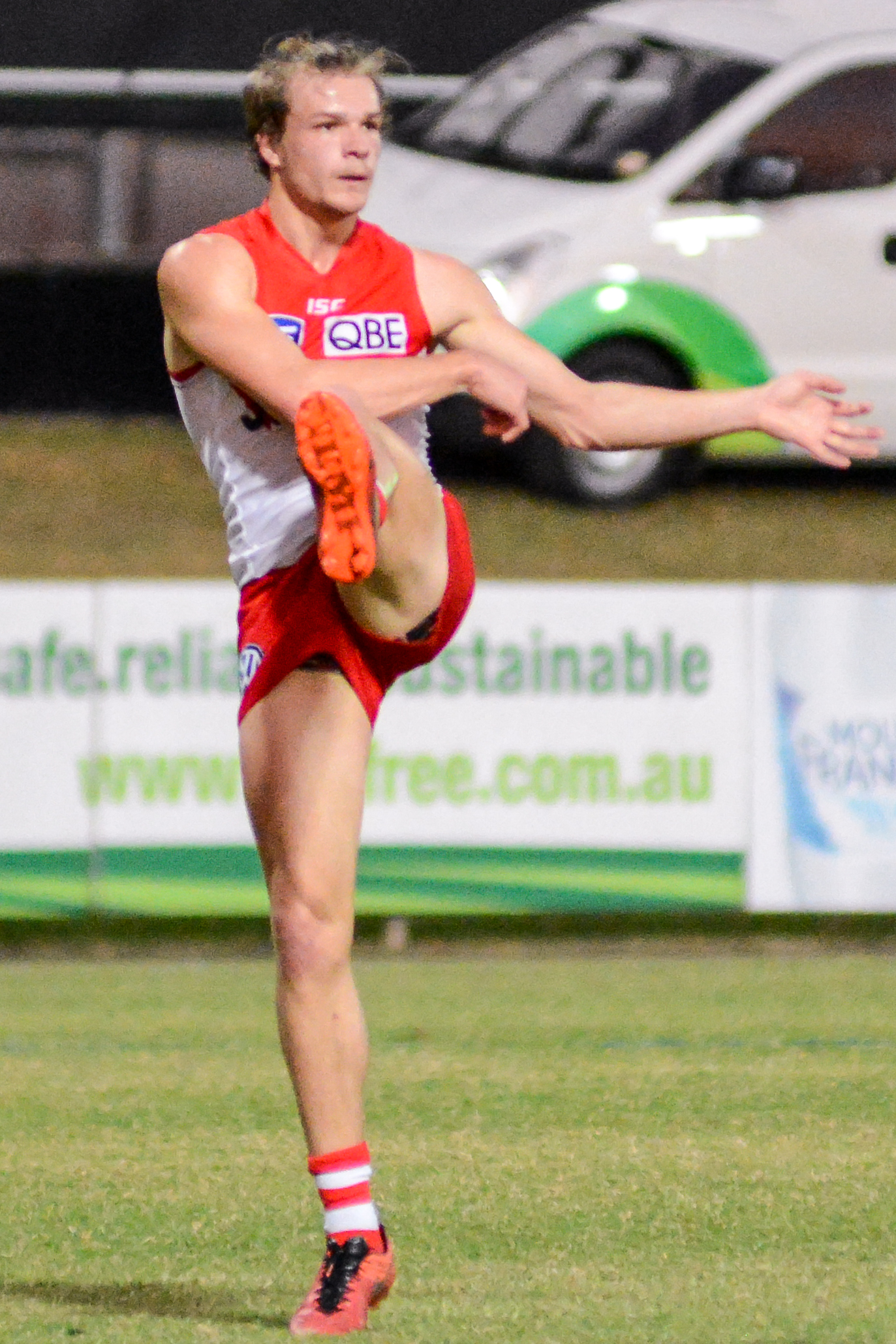
- Jack playing for the Sydney Swans reserves in August 2016

Personal information
- Full name: Brandon Luke Jack
- Born: 25 May 1994 (age 32); Manchester, England
- Original team: Pennant Hills (Sydney AFL)
- Draft: No. 58, 2013 rookie draft
- Height: 182 cm (6 ft 0 in)
- Weight: 80 kg (176 lb)
- Position: Midfield / forward

Playing career^{1}
Years	Club	Games (Goals)
2013–2017	Sydney	28 (16)
- ^{1} Playing statistics correct to the end of 2017.

Brandon Luke Jack (born 25 May 1994) is an Australian author, journalist and former professional footballer who played for the Sydney Swans in the Australian Football League (AFL).

As a youngster Jack played for Westbrook Junior AFL club. Jack then went on to play for Pennant Hills. Jack's older brother Kieren Jack also played for the Swans and his father Garry Jack is a former rugby league footballer and coach. At the conclusion of the 2017 season, he was delisted by Sydney.

Jack currently writes for the Sydney Morning Herald. After having previously enrolled in a law double degree, Jack studied a Bachelor of Arts, majoring in sociology with a minor in creative writing at UNSW, completing his studies in 2022.

In 2021, Jack released his memoirs, titled 28. He followed this up in 2025 with Pissants, a novel set at a football club.

== Statistics ==
Statistics are correct to the end of the 2017 season

Legend
G	Goals	K	Kicks	D	Disposals	T	Tackles
B	Behinds	H	Handballs	M	Marks

Season	Team	No.	Games	Totals							Averages (per game)						
Season	Team	No.	Games	G	B	K	H	D	M	T	G	B	K	H	D	M	T
2013	Sydney	33	9	7	5	40	28	68	11	20	0.8	0.6	4.4	3.1	7.6	1.2	2.2
2014	Sydney	33	8	3	3	29	32	61	12	23	0.4	0.4	3.6	4.0	7.6	1.5	2.9
2015	Sydney	33	10	6	5	66	60	126	26	31	0.6	0.5	6.6	6.0	12.6	2.6	3.1
2016	Sydney	33	0	—	—	—	—	—	—	—	—	—	—	—	—	—	—
2017	Sydney	33	1	0	0	2	7	9	3	5	0.0	0.0	2.0	7.0	9.0	3.0	5.0
Career			28	16	13	137	127	264	52	79	0.6	0.5	4.9	4.5	9.4	1.9	2.8
