= Bernie Evans =

Australian rules footballer

Personal information
- Born: 20 August 1957 (age 69)
- Original team: Port Melbourne (VFA)
- Height: 178 cm (5 ft 10 in)
- Weight: 76 kg (168 lb)

Playing career^{1}
Years	Club	Games (Goals)
1978–1985	South Melbourne/Sydney	148 (212)
1986–1988	Carlton	37 (45)
Total		185 (257)
- ^{1} Playing statistics correct to the end of 1988.

Bernie Evans (born 20 August 1957) is a former Australian rules footballer who played with South Melbourne and Carlton in the VFL.

Evans was a rover but was also used at half forward. He won Sydney's best and fairest award in 1984. In 1986 he moved to Carlton and played in that year's losing grand final. He missed out on a chance to go one better the following season after he was suspended for the grand final.
