= Bill Windley =

Australian rules footballer

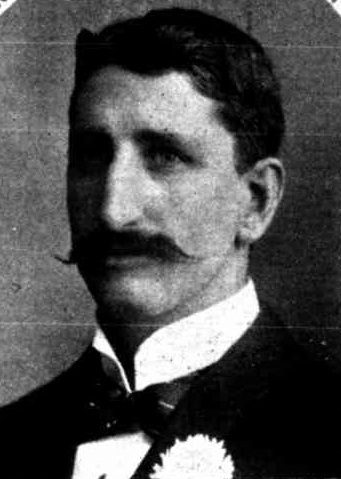
- Windley in 1899

Personal information
- Full name: William Dean Windley
- Born: 28 August 1868; South Melbourne, Victoria
- Died: 30 August 1953 (aged 85); Windsor, Victoria
- Original team: South Melbourne (VFA)
- Position: Centreman/Rover

Playing career^{1}
Years	Club	Games (Goals)
1886, 1888–1896	South Melbourne (VFA)	136 (30)
1897–1905	South Melbourne (VFL)	129 (36)
Total		265 (66)
- ^{1} Playing statistics correct to the end of 1905.

Career highlights
- VFA premiership player 1888–1890; South Melbourne captain 1900, 1902

William Dean Windley (28 August 1868 – 30 August 1953) was an Australian rules footballer who played with South Melbourne in the Victorian Football League (VFL).

== Football ==
Windley was one of South Melbourne's veteran players when they started out in the VFL, having played in the VFA since 1886, and been a regular selection since 1888. He had been a member of their 1888, 1889 and 1890 premiership teams, and their 1896 team that was beaten in the premiership play-off match.

An elusive player, he was a centreman in the VFA, but was often used as a rover later on in his career and also spent some time up forward. In the VFL, he captained South Melbourne in 1900 and 1902, and also played in their losing 1899 Grand Final team.

Off the field, he worked for The Argus newspaper for 55 years from 1881 to his retirement in 1936.

Windley retired after Round 16 of 1905, one week after his 37th birthday, and was later a trainer and equipment manager at South Melbourne; his career total of 265 games remained the club record until it was broken by Michael O'Loughlin in Round 19 of 2007, 102 years after Windley's last match, 54 years after his death, and 26 years after the Swans' relocation to Sydney.

At the time, Windley's 265 games was also second in elite Victorian football behind his former South Melbourne teammate Peter Burns (305 games, 216 in the VFA and 89 in the VFL), and equal third in elite Australian rules football with South Australian George "Geordie" Webb (played 238 games in the SAFA and 27 in the WAFA, and retired at the end of 1905), being behind Burns and the South Australian Jack "Dinny" Reedman (293 games, would retire in 1909 with 319 games).
