= Charles Clements (footballer) =

Australian rules footballer

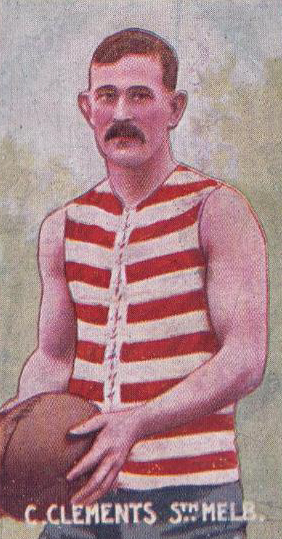
- Cigarette card of Clements in 1906

Personal information
- Full name: Charles Henry Clements
- Born: 21 March 1882; North Melbourne, Victoria
- Died: 1 May 1927 (aged 45); Dunolly, Victoria
- Original team: Brunswick (VFA)

Playing career^{1}
Years	Club	Games (Goals)
1904–1905	South Melbourne	32 (68)
- ^{1} Playing statistics correct to the end of 1905.

Charles 'Bones' Clements (21 March 1882 – 1 May 1927) was an Australian rules footballer who played for South Melbourne in the Victorian Football League (VFL).

Clements joined South Melbourne in 1904 after three seasons at Victorian Football Association (VFA) club Brunswick. A forward, Clements spent just two seasons with South Melbourne but managed to kick 68 goals, topping the club's goalkicking in both years.

Clements returned to Brunswick after the end of his VFL career, before moving first to Upper Goulburn Football Association club Murchison before moving back to the VFA at Northcote. While with Brunswick Clements kicked a club record 11 goals in a game against Essendon 'A', although he was mainly remembered by fans for his habit of leaving the ground at 1/2 time to drink three beers at a nearby pub before returning to the ground for the start of the third quarter (A break of no more than fifteen minutes).

== Sources ==
- Atkinson, G. (1982) Everything you ever wanted to know about Australian rules football but couldn't be bothered asking, The Five Mile Press: Melbourne. ISBN 0 86788 009 0.
