= Sydney Swans =

Australian rules football club

Names
- Full name: Sydney Swans Limited
- Former name(s): South Melbourne Football Club (1874–1981); The Swans (1982)
- Nickname(s): Swans, Swannies, Bloods
- Leading goalkicker: Charlie Curnow (75 goals)

Club details
- Founded: 19 June 1874; 152 years ago
- Colours: Red White
- Competition: AFL: Senior men AFLW: Senior women VFL: Reserves men
- Coach: AFL: Dean Cox; AFLW: Colin O'Riordan; VFL: Nick Malceski
- Captain(s): AFL: Callum Mills, Isaac Heeney (vice-captain); AFLW: Lucy McEvoy, Sofia Hurley (vice-captain), Cynthia Hamilton (vice-captain); VFL: Nic Shipley
- Membership (2025): ▲76,674
- Number-one ticket holder: Jason Kimberley
- Premierships: VFL/AFL (5): 1909; 1918; 1933; 2005; 2012; VFA (5): 1881; 1885; 1888; 1889; 1890; Reserves (4): 2005; 2006; 2007; 2008; South Melbourne in italics.
- Ground: AFL: Sydney Cricket Ground (48,000); AFLW: Henson Park (20,000) North Sydney Oval (10,000); VFL: Sydney Cricket Ground, Tramway Oval (1,000)
- Former ground: Lakeside Oval (1874–1981); Stadium Australia (2002–2015)
- Training ground: Outdoor: Sydney Cricket Ground, Tramway Oval, Moore Park; Indoor: Basil Sellers Richard Colless Centre (Royal Hall of Industries), Moore Park

Uniforms
Home	Clash	Heritage

Other information
- Official website: sydneyswans.com.au

The Sydney Swans are an Australian rules football club based in Sydney, New South Wales. The men's team competes in the Australian Football League (AFL), and the women's team in the AFL Women's (AFLW). The Swans also field a reserves men's team in the Victorian Football League (VFL). The Sydney Swans Academy, consisting of the club's best junior development signings, contests Division 2 of the men's and women's underage national championships and the Talent League.

The club's origins trace back to 21 March 1873, when a meeting was held at the Clarendon Hotel in South Melbourne to establish a junior football club, to be called the South Melbourne Football Club. The club commenced playing in 1874 at its home ground, Lakeside Oval in Albert Park. Playing as South Melbourne, it participated in the Victorian Football Association (VFA) competition from 1878. In 1880 the club merged with the Albert Park Football Club, adopting the latter's red and white colours. The club joined the breakaway Victorian Football League (VFL) as a founding member in 1897.

Originally known as the "Bloods" in reference to the red colour used on players' guernseys, the Swan emblem was adopted in 1933 after a journalist at the time referred to them using the moniker following a large influx of Western Australian players. In 1982, it became the first professional Australian football club to permanently relocate interstate (from Victoria to New South Wales). Initially playing in Sydney as "The Swans", it was given its current name in 1983.

The club has a rivalry with the Greater Western Sydney Giants, with whom they contest the Sydney Derby. Their headquarters and training facilities are located in the Moore Park sporting precinct, with offices and indoor training at the Royal Hall of Industries and outdoor sessions conducted on the adjacent Tramway Oval and Sydney Cricket Ground, the latter being the site of the club's senior men's team home matches since 1982. The Swans have won five VFL/AFL premierships including 1909, 1918, and 1933, before experiencing a 72-year premiership drought—the longest of any team in the competition's history. This premiership drought ended with the 2005 premiership, which was later followed by another title in 2012. Their five premierships are supplemented by fourteen grand final defeats, the most recent of which came in 2024. According to Roy Morgan statistics, the Swans are one of the most supported clubs in the AFL with more than a million fans in 2021; it has also been the most supported club in the league for the past nineteen years consecutively, dating back to 2006.

== History ==
=== Origins: 1873–1876 ===
The club's origins trace back to 21 March 1873, when a meeting was held at the Clarendon Hotel in South Melbourne for the purpose of establishing a junior football club, to be called the South Melbourne Football Club.

According to club historians, it was incorporated at the Temperance Hall, Napier Street at Emerald Hill 19 June 1874. It was first known as "Cecil Football Club" (after Cecil Street, South Melbourne, one of the early thoroughfares), but adopted the name "South Melbourne Football Club" four weeks later on 15 July. The club was based at Lake Oval alongside the lake in Albert Park, also home of the South Melbourne Cricket Club.

While one of the early favourites to win, South Melbourne were a notable exclusion from the Challenge Cup competitions of the 1870s with entry to this competition strictly limited to clubs playing under the Melbourne Football Club's rules. The club's lack of adherence to the Victorian Rules (and insistence on playing by its own rules) resulted in some controversial early wins. This, along with ability to regularly field a full senior team, may have contributed to its absence during the football season competition begun in the 1870s. Throughout this period South Melbourne, along with neighbouring Cup member club Albert Park FC, had experimented with rugby football rules which in May 1874 had advocated strongly for their widespread adoption in Victoria; however, this did not meet favour with the more powerful clubs in the colony.

Despite not being part of the big league of clubs, South Melbourne by the mid-1870s is recorded to have enough senior players to field two teams of twenty and played matches against non-Cup clubs during this time against nearby clubs including Fawkner Park, Elwood, West Melbourne, Southern Rifles in 1875 and Sandridge Alma, St Kilda Alma, Victoria Parade, and Williamstown in 1876 among others. Many of this group of clubs most of which had primarily juniors had also begun to discuss starting their own cup competition.

South was one of Victoria's most prolific touring clubs. Seeking more regular senior competition in 1876 South Melbourne also went on one of its first regional tours playing against newly formed clubs at Beechworth, Blackwood, Taradale and Ballarat.

=== VFA era: 1877–1896 ===
South Melbourne was a junior foundation club of the Victorian Football Association in 1877, and attained senior status in 1879.

==== Amalgamation with Albert Park FC ====
In 1880, South Melbourne amalgamated with the nearby Albert Park FC, which had a senior football history dating back to May 1867 (Albert Park FC had, in fact, been known as South Melbourne FC during its first year of existence). The 1880 amalgamation adopted the red and white colours of Albert Park under the name South Melbourne FC. While relying on the Albert Park FC lineage to claim status as the world's oldest surviving professional football club to wear a red and white strip, the modern-day Swans recognise their foundation year as 1874 rather than 1867 (Albert Park) or the 1880 amalgamation date. Following the amalgamation the club became the strongest in metropolitan Melbourne. Nicknamed the "Southerners", the team was more colourfully known as the "Bloods", in reference to the bright red diagonal sash on their white jumpers The colourful epithet the "Bloodstained Angels" was also in use.

==== VFA success ====
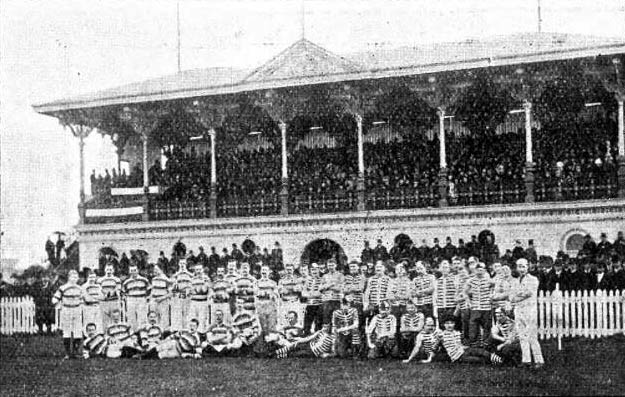
The Bloods and the touring British Lions in front of the grandstand at the South Melbourne Cricket Ground in 1888. South Melbourne won 7 goals to 3

Over its first decade as an amalgamated club, South Melbourne won five VFA premierships – in 1881, 1885 (undefeated) and three-in-a-row in 1888, 1889 and 1890 – and was runner-up to the provincial Geelong Football Club in 1880, 1883 and 1886. The 1886 season was notable for its 4 September match against Geelong, which generated unprecedented public interest as both clubs had entered the match undefeated.

The club was the second Victorian club to visit New South Wales in 1883 travelling to Newcastle where it also defeated the Northern Districts League by a goal before travelling to Sydney where it defeated Sydney by just a single goal in front of a large crowd at the Sydney Cricket Ground and East Sydney Football Club by a goal in front of 600 spectators.

In May 1889, the Swans lost narrowly to a touring Maori team from New Zealand.

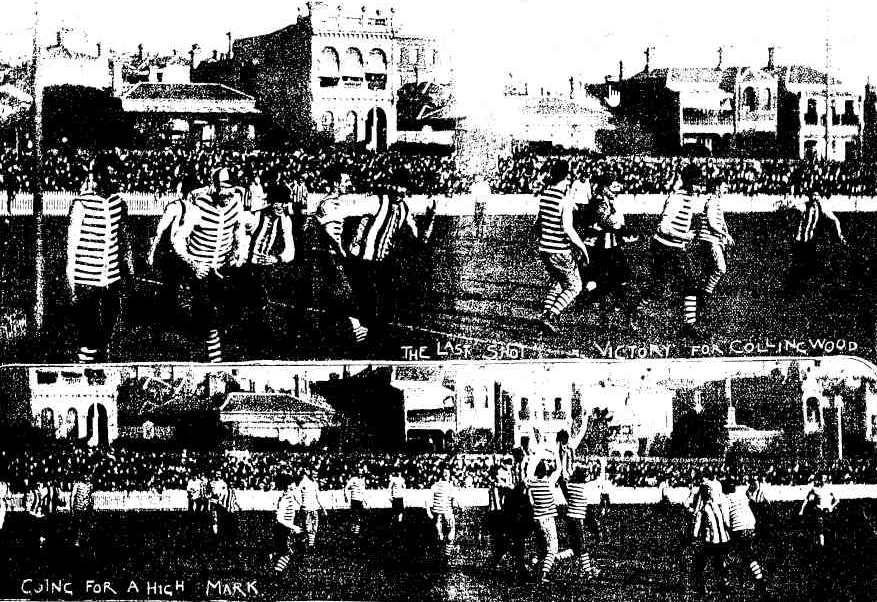
South Melbourne played in the first Victorian Grand Final, the 1896 VFA Grand Final

At the end of the 1896 season, Collingwood and South Melbourne finished equal at the top of the VFA's premiership ladder with records of 14–3–1, requiring a playoff match to determine the season's premiership; this was the first time this had occurred in VFA history. The match took place on 3 October 1896 at the East Melbourne Cricket Ground. Collingwood won the match, six goals to five, in front of an estimated crowd of 12,000.

This grand final would be the last match South Melbourne would play in the VFA, as the following season they would be one of eight founding clubs forming the breakaway Victorian Football League joining St Kilda, Essendon, Fitzroy, Melbourne, Geelong, Carlton and Collingwood.

=== VFL entry: 1897–1909 ===
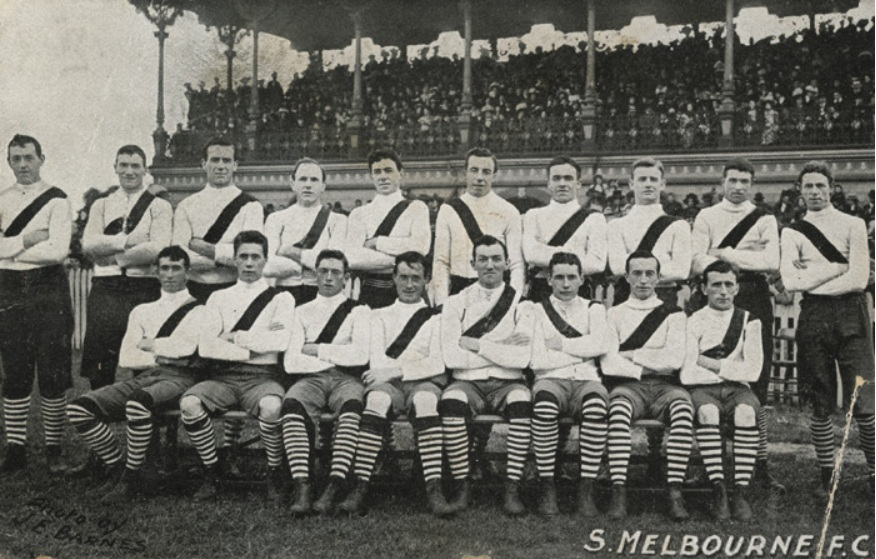
1909 VFL team

South Melbourne was one of the original founding clubs of the Victorian Football League that was formed in 1897.

=== Premiership success: 1909–1945 ===
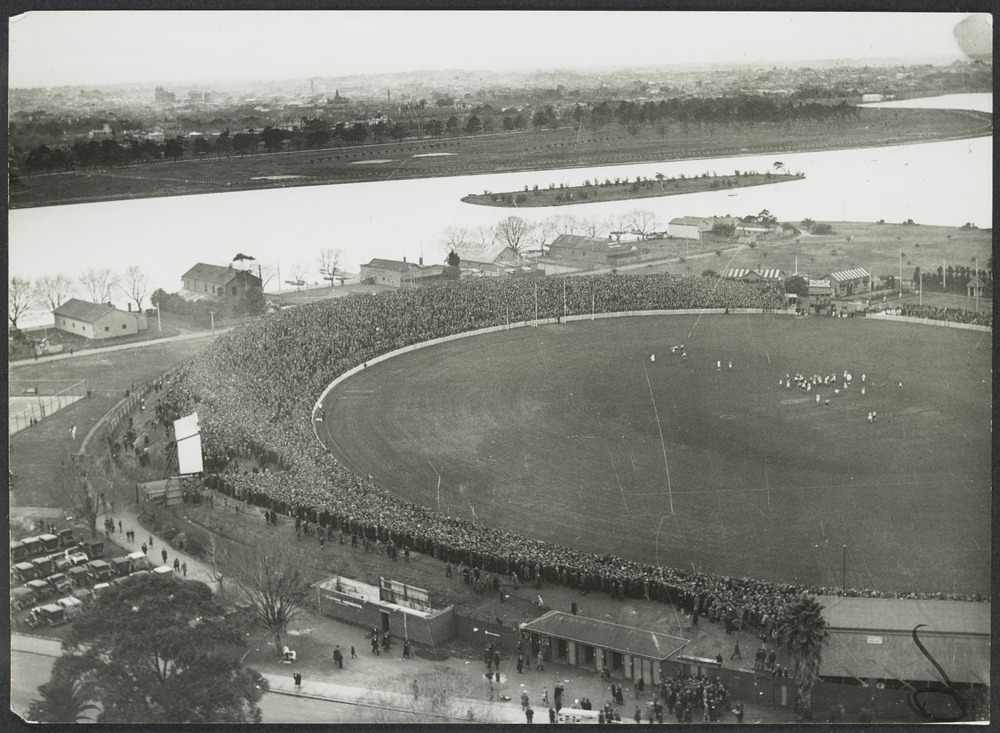
Aerial photo of the South Melbourne cricket ground during the 1920s with a SMFC match in progress

The club had early success and won three VFL premierships in 1909, 1918 and 1933. However, they were the subject of some off-field difficulties, and the late 1920s, the South Melbourne Districts Football Club donated 40 guineas to South Melbourne to stop them from folding. The Districts also often provided assistance payments to players when needed.

In 1932, the red sash on the guernsey was replaced with a red "V". The club was at its most successful in the 1930s, when key recruits from both Victoria and interstate led to a string of appearances in the finals, including four successive grand final appearances from 1933 to 1936, albeit with only one premiership in 1933. The collection of players recruited from interstate in 1932/1933 became known as South Melbourne's "Foreign Legion".

On grand final eve, 1935, as the Swans prepared to take on Collingwood, star full-forward Bob Pratt was clipped by a truck moments after stepping off a tram and subsequently missed the match for South. Ironically, the truck driver was a South Melbourne supporter.

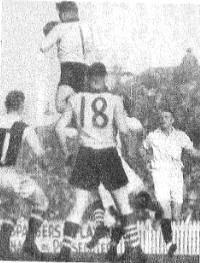
Captain Laurie Nash marks on 26 June 1937

It was during this period that the team became known as the Swans. The nickname, which was suggested by a Herald and Weekly Times artist in 1933, was inspired by the number of Western Australians in the team (the black swan being the state emblem of Western Australia), and was formally adopted by the club before the following season 1934. The name stuck, in part due to the club's association with nearby Albert Park and Lake, also known for its swans (although there are no longer any non-native white swans and only black, indigenous swans in the lake).

After several years with only limited success, South Melbourne next reached the grand final in 1945. The match, played against Carlton, was to become known colloquially as "the Bloodbath", due to the player brawl that overshadowed the match, with a total of 9 players being reported by the umpires. Carlton won the match by 28 points, and from then on, South Melbourne struggled for many years.

=== Struggling times: 1946–1981 ===
Following the end of the second world war, South Melbourne consistently struggled, as their traditional inner-city recruiting district largely emptied as a result of demographic shifts. The club missed the finals in 1946 and continued to fall such that by 1950 they were second-last on the ladder. They narrowly missed the finals in 1952, but from 1953 to 1969, they never finished any higher than eighth on the ladder. By the 1960s it was clear that South Melbourne's financial resources would not be capable of allowing them to compete in the growing market for country and interstate players, and their own local zone was never strong enough to compensate for this. The introduction of country zoning failed to help, as the Riverina Football League proved to be one of the least profitable zones.

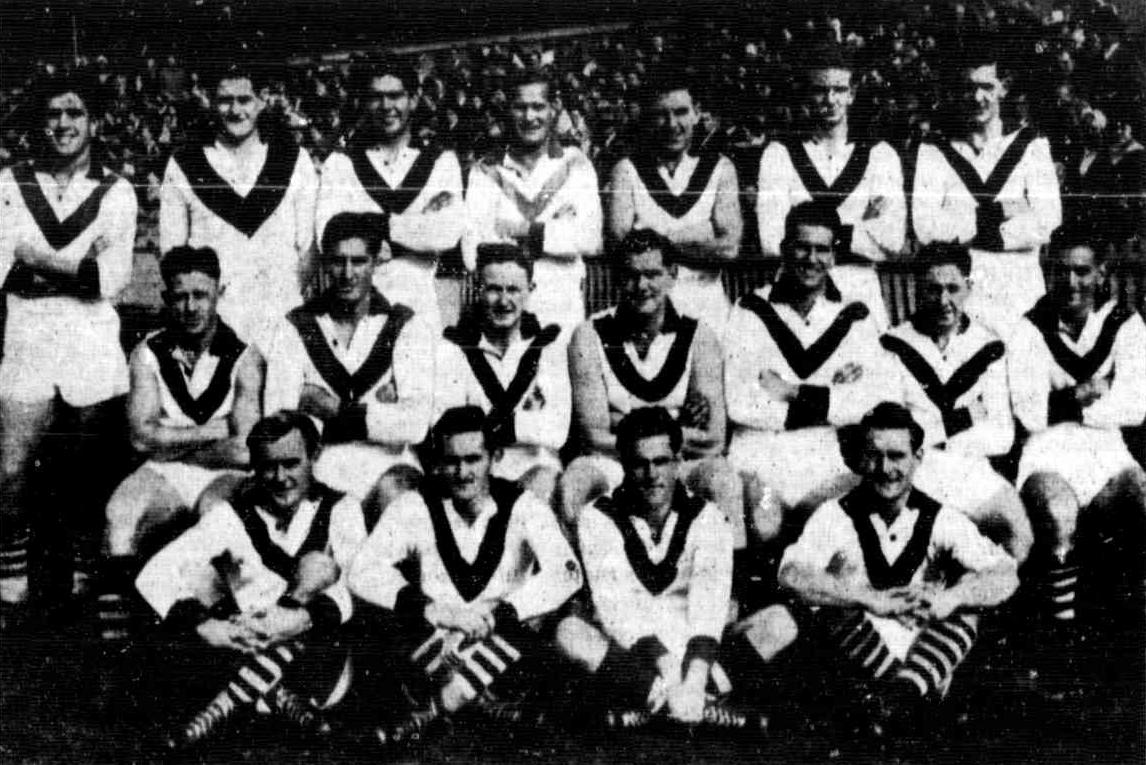
1951 VFL team

Between 1945 and 1981, South Melbourne made the finals only twice: under legendary coach Norm Smith, South Melbourne finished fourth in 1970, but lost the first semi-final; and, in 1977, the club finished fifth under coach Ian Stewart, but lost the elimination final. In that time, they "won" three wooden spoons. Between Round 7, 1972 and Round 13, 1973, the team lost 29 consecutive games. By the end of the 1970s, South Melbourne were saddled with massive debts after struggling for such a long period of time.

=== A VFL club for Sydney ===
Chart of yearly ladder positions for Sydney in VFL/AFL

The first football clubs in Sydney of any code were established in 1865 with two Australian rules football clubs named the Sydney FC and the Australian FC. The president of Sydney FC was cricket player and administrator Richard Driver, who between 1857 and 1865 had come into contact with cricketer and football pioneer Tom Wills numerous times in Sydney and Melbourne. The public road today situated outside the western walls of the SCG and Sydney Football Stadium is named Driver Avenue in his honour. The two clubs in 1865 played their matches on Hyde Park in the city. Both clubs were defunct after just two seasons and over the remainder of the 19th century the code had a sporadic existence in Sydney.

The VFL had been actively seeking an audience in Sydney since its first exhibition match in 1903 drew 20,000 people. For more than three quarters of a century, it had strategically scheduled matches in Sydney and through the Australian National Football Council – had allocated a significant share of its marketing budget to developing the code in Sydney, showcasing interstate tournaments and encouraging its clubs to play against the state representative side. At one point, it even attempted to negotiate a hybrid code with rugby league. However interest in the code in Sydney remained the poorest in the country (where it was behind three other football codes). In the late 1970s, however, with increasing professionalism of the sport there was an overall increase in national interest in the VFL competition.

In 1976, Melbourne journalist Jim Main began to break a story that a leading Melbourne businessman who had relocated to Sydney, Mannie Bongornio, had been meeting with Allen Aylett about luring a VFL club to Sydney. The idea began to gain traction and in 1977, Ron Barassi proposed the VFL setting up a club in Sydney, which he offered to coach believing that it would help spread the code in the state. Upon becoming league president, Aylett had the league investigate playing Sunday matches at the SCG. The VFL scheduled 2 premiership matches for the Sydney Cricket Ground in 1979. One of them, between the previous year's grand finalists North Melbourne and Hawthorn drew a record 31,395 to the gates. In 1979 the financially struggling Fitzroy Lions conducted a feasibility into the possibility of moving to North Sydney and a proposal was put forward, but was voted down by its board in 1980. To test the market further, the VFL scheduled 4 matches for the SCG in 1980 with an average attendance of 19,000. In April 1980, the VFL stated that its market study showed there was sufficient support for a Sydney team, finding that there was an increase in television ratings in Sydney and sustained attendance at matches and that it intended to have a team in Sydney, possibly as soon as 1982. A 1981 report by Graham Huggins concluded that there was an "untapped market in Sydney which represented an excellent opportunity for the league." The report claimed that 60,000 people in Sydney had stated that they would regularly support the new club and 90% of these supporters would watch VFL on television from Sydney and 80% of these supporters had not attended rugby and 92% believed that Australian rules could become popular in Sydney.

In 1981 the VFL had decided that it would establish an entirely new 13th VFL club in Sydney along with a possible 14th team. The VFL was under strong pressure from interests in Adelaide to admit a South Australian club and from the ACT for a new Canberra license, however VFL president Allan Aylett was convinced that Sydney was the most viable option. By 1981, Canberra's ACTAFL had edged out rugby league in popularity with an increase in participation it had become the number one sport. Under significant pressure from a rugby league junior development push and fearing the impact on its strong local competition of entry of a Sydney team made a formal bid for licence to enter a Canberra team into the VFL. With corporate backing and strong public support including local legend Alex Jesaulenko, the Canberra bid was confident it would be a successful expansion club. Aylett however, determined to pursue the entry of a Sydney team, dismissed the Canberra bid publishing a scathing report on the development of football in the ACT, stating that the VFL might consider Canberra for a licence in another 10 years. Aylett's view was that Sydney offered a much bigger television audience and the most potential to add to the league's lucrative television rights. The league had also estimated that the club could initially draw support from an estimated 300,000 ex-Victorians living in and around Sydney.

With the possibility of another club making Sydney a viable move, in 1981, the South Melbourne board, recognising the structural difficulties it faced with long-term viability and financial stability in Melbourne, decided not to miss what it saw as a strategic opportunity to capture an untapped market and save its club. The board made the decision to play all 1982 home games in Sydney. The club had been operating at a loss of at least $150,000 for the previous five years. News of the proposal broke on 2 July 1981, after which a letter was sent to members justifying the board's reasons for making the proposal and noting that the coach and current players were in favour of the move. On 29 July 1981, the VFL formally accepted the proposal, and paved the way for the Swans to shift to Sydney in 1982.

Inevitably, the move caused very great internal difficulties as a large supporters' group known as Keep South at South campaigned against the move throughout the rest of 1981; and, at an extraordinary general meeting on 22 September, the group democratically won control of the club's board. However, the new board did not have the power to unilaterally stop the move to Sydney: under the VFL constitution, to rescind the decision that had been made on 29 July required a three-quarters majority in a vote of all twelve clubs, and at a meeting on 14 October it failed to obtain this majority. The new board, whilst representative of most fans, lacked the support of the players, many of whom were in favour of a long-term move to Sydney; in early November, after the board promised that it would try to bring the club back to Melbourne in 1983, the players went on strike, seeking to force the new board to commit to Sydney in the long term as well as seeking payments that the cash-strapped club owed them from the previous season. The board ended up undermining its own position when it accepted a $400,000 loan from the VFL in late November in order to stay solvent, under the condition that it commit to Sydney for at least two years. Finally, in early December, the Keep South at South board resigned and a board in favour of the move to Sydney was installed.

=== Swans move to Sydney: 1982–1984 ===
In 1982, the club was still technically a Melbourne-based club which played all of its home games at the Sydney Cricket Ground. Its physical "home club" was the "Southern Cross Social Club" at 120a Clovelly Road, Randwick In response to the move, the club's sponsors, Bond Corporation pulled out and the club was left without a major backer. At a major launch in Sydney, Aylett vindicated the league's decision, announcing it had signed a new sponsor, Ward Transport, and that on-field success for the Swans would soon follow. The Swans experienced success in the 1982 Escort Championships with 1,000 supporters packing out the Chevron Hotel ballroom in King Cross in response to the win, however Channel Seven did not broadcast the match in Sydney.

1982 Escort Championships Final	G	B	Total
Swans	13	12	90
North Melbourne	8	10	58
Venue: VFL Park	Crowd: 20,028

The club won their first official Sydney home game against Melbourne in front of 15,764.

On 2 June 1982, it dropped the name "South Melbourne", officially becoming "the Swans" for the rest of the season. The name change, however, did not endear either the Sydney media or the Sydney public, and after successive games at home, began to draw as few as 10,000. Despite just missing the finals, and some good wins at home and respectable home crowds against league leaders Carlton and Richmond, the lack of success and cold reception in Sydney led to the lustre quickly leaving the league's glamour team. It was officially renamed the "Sydney Swans" in 1983.

In 1983 average crowds in Sydney continued to plummet to 12,000 and Swans supporter packages dropped to as low as 100 members (well short of the 20,000 average crowds predicted by the VFL's 1980 Hennessy Report). Television ratings and sponsorship revenue in Sydney were also far below the league's expectations.

Operating at a loss well short of the VFL's predicted $750,000 a year profit poor financial performance continued to drown the club in 1984, with the club flagging pay cuts to its players in order to survive. Coach Ricky Quade resigned and caretaker coach Bob Hammond, despite showing some promise, was unable to turn the club's poor performance around. In order to keep the club solvent during this time, the VFL began to write loans to the Swans that the club would have been unable to pay off on its own. The Swans were the league's most reliant on sponsorship and subsidies from the VFL to stay solvent and meet player payments due to its continued poor crowds, public apathy and poor TV ratings.

Public support for the Swans in Sydney was so bad that by the start of the 1985 season, the VFL began to backflip and the league's administrators, having sunk large amounts of money into the club began looking to offload it.

=== Edelsten era and privatisation: 1985–1987 ===
On 31 July 1985, for what was thought to be $6.3 million, Geoffrey Edelsten "bought" the Swans; in reality it was $2.9 million in cash with funding and other payments spread over five years. Edelsten resigned as chairman in less than twelve months, but had already made his mark. He immediately recruited former Geelong coach Tom Hafey. Hafey, in turn, used his knowledge of Geelong's contracts to recruit David Bolton, Bernard Toohey and Greg Williams, who would all form a key part of the Sydney side, at a league-determined total fee of $240,000 (less than the $500,000 Geelong demanded and even the $300,000 Sydney offered). The likes of Gerard Healy, Merv Neagle and Paul Morwood were also poached from other clubs, and failed approaches were made to Simon Madden, Terry Daniher, Andrew Bews and Maurice Rioli.

During the Edelsten years, the Swans were seen by the Sydney public as a flamboyant, flashy club, typified by the style of its spearhead, Warwick Capper, his long bright blond mullet and bright pink boots made him unmissable on the field and his pink Lamborghini, penchant for girlfriends who were fashion models and his general showy eccentricity made him notorious off the field – all somewhat fashionable in the 1980s. During Capper's peak years, the Swans had made successive finals appearances for the first time since relocating. His consistently spectacular aerial exploits earned him the Mark of the Year award in 1987 while his goalkicking efforts (amassing 103 goals in 1987) made him runner up in the Coleman Medal two years running. The Swans' successive finals appearances saw crowds during this time peak at an average of around 25,000 per game. Edelsten also introduced the "Swanettes", becoming the sole such American-style cheerleading group among VFL teams following the disbandment of Carlton's Blue Birds in 1986. The Swanettes did not get much performance time, owing to the short intervals between quarters of play in the VFL and the lack of space in which they might perform while other activities take place on the field. The Swanettes were rapidly discontinued. During the Edelsten era, the club's owner and the private company Westec are reported to have sunk more than $10 million in additional private capital to keep the club afloat.

When the Southern Cross club went bankrupt in 1987, the club relocated to the newly built Sydney Football Stadium.

In 1987, the Swans scored 201 points against the West Coast Eagles and the following week scored 236 points against the Essendon Football Club. Both games were at the SCG. The Swans remain one of only two clubs to have scored consecutive team tallies above 200 points, the only other being Geelong in 1992. However, this was followed by several heavy losses, including defeat by Hawthorn by 99 points in the Qualifying Final and by 76 points against Melbourne in the First Semi-final.

=== Dark times: 1988–1994 ===
The club's form was to slump in the following year. Losses were in the millions. It was obvious to most that the Swans were struggling financially, though the owners, Sydney Rules Pty Ltd a subsidiary of Powerplay International Ltd were not selling. In early 1988 the company advised the Australian Securities Exchange to cease trading its shares as it could not continue to trade until it had offloaded the Swans. A Canberra consortium including the ACTAFL initially proposed to buy the failed club and shift it to Canberra, however the VFL claimed this was too extreme a move. The league compromised and along with Aylett, who had denied Canberra a licence in 1981, proposed that the Swans play away games in the ACT with a dual aim of giving the club a sustainable supporter base and helping resurrect the code in the ACT which had lost enormous ground to rugby league since the introduction of the Canberra Raiders. However the VFL blocked the move feeling that the club would lose its identity if it were to play matches in Canberra.

By mid year the VFL had revoked the Swans licence and took over ownership of the club, after an investigation under VFL CEO Ross Oakley determined that it was unable to continue operating. However, there were no buyers. On 6 May 1988 the VFL paid Powerplay just $10 to transfer ownership of the club in an attempt to keep it afloat until a buyer could be found. The VFL would wait months for the club to regain financial security. The VFL had reported that it needed to find a buyer willing to pay at least $4 million in order to make the club financially viable in the medium to long term. In the meantime, the league had secured a sponsor which helped underwrite the club until the sale.

At the end of 1988 the VFL re-tendered the Swans licence and a group of financial backers including Mike Willesee, Basil Sellers, Peter Weinert and Craig Kimberley, purchased the licence and bankrolled the club.

Morale at the side plummeted as players were asked to take pay cuts. Coach Tom Hafey was sacked by the club in 1988 after a player-led rebellion at his tough training methods (unusual in the semi-professional days of that era). The Willesee consortia appointed Col Kinnear as the new coach.

Capper was sold to the Brisbane Bears for AUD$400,000 in a desperate attempt to improve the club's finances. Instead, it only led to disastrous on-field performances. Instead of a 100-goal-a-season forward, Sydney's goalkicking was led by Bernard Toohey (usually a defender) with 29 in 1989, then Jim West with 34 in 1990. Players left the club in droves, including Brownlow Medalist Greg Williams, Bernard Toohey and Barry Mitchell. The careers of stars such as Dennis Carroll, David Bolton, Ian Roberts, Tony Morwood and David Murphy wound down, while promising young players like Jamie Lawson, Robert Teal and Paul Bryce had their careers cut short by injury.

Attendances consistently dropped below 10,000 when the team performed poorly between 1990 and 1994. Kinnear in 1990 urged his players rally to support the club's loyal fans and stem their mass exodus however he was ultimately stood down in August 1991. The nadir came with three consecutive wooden spoons in 1992, 1993 and 1994.

In October 1992, members from the 15 AFL clubs voted on axing the struggling Swans. To fill the void left by the Swans, the league floated a radical proposal for Carlton or Collingwood to play all of their away games in Sydney, however it was felt that even the leagues most popular clubs wouldn't be able to draw a sufficient audience in Sydney to cover for the loss of the Swans. The AFL extended an offer for a Tasmanian licence which was declined, and received an offer from the ACTAFL to relocate the club to Canberra, however the AFL rejected this. There were also strong rumours that the AFL intended to merge the club with the Brisbane Bears to form a combined New South Wales/Queensland team, fold altogether, or even move back to South Melbourne. Without adequate alternatives the AFL Commission instead decided to step in and save the club, offering substantial monetary and management support, with the 15 clubs asked to cover the club's AUD$1.2 million annual expenses including licence fee and hire of the SCG. With draft and salary cap concessions in the early 1990s and a series of notable recruits, the team became competitive after the early part of the decade.

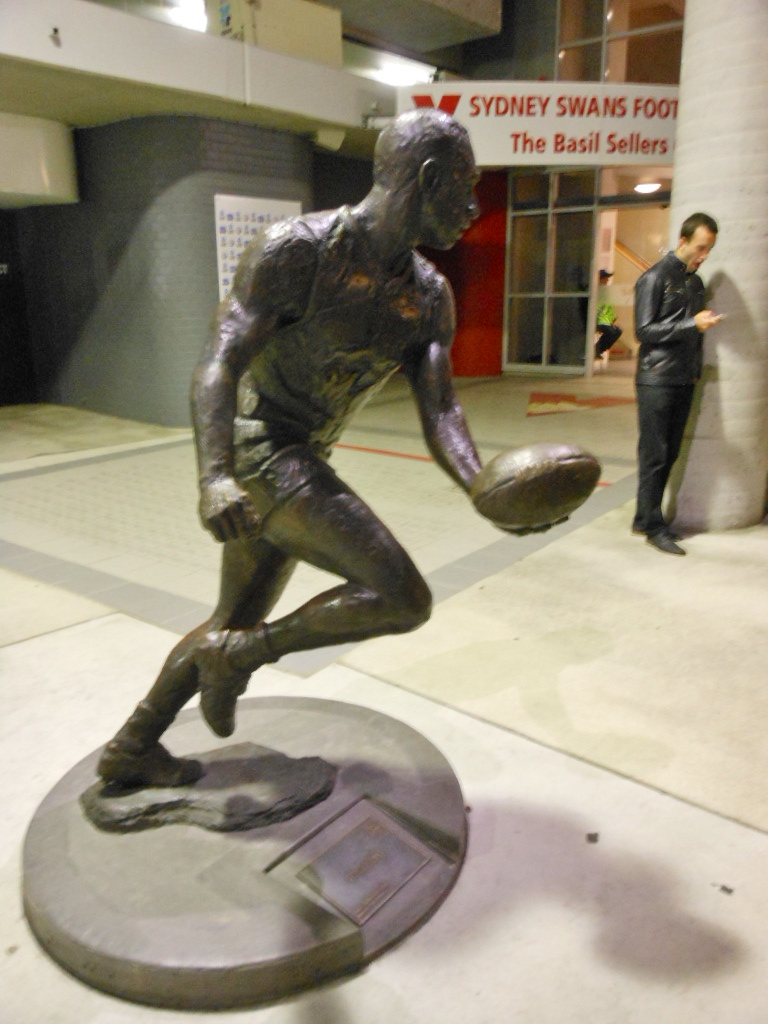
Statue of Paul Kelly at the SCG. Kelly, a New South Welshman, known as "captain courageous" he was one of Sydney's longest serving skippers captaining the side between 1993 and 2002.

During this time, the side was largely held together by two inspirational skippers, both from the Wagga Wagga region of country New South Wales, Dennis Carroll and later the courageous captain Paul Kelly. However coach Gary Buckenara was sacked after 18 straight losses, managing to register just 2 wins and a draw during his term.

Desperate to hang on, the club was keen to enlist the biggest names and identities in the AFL, and recruited Ron Barassi as coach who helped save the club from extinction while serving them as coach from Round 7, 1993 to 1995. At roughly the same time, Dermott Brereton was also recruited from Hawthorn on a three-year contract becoming one of the swans highest paid players, and was considered to replace Paul Kelly as club captain. However, Brereton's time in Sydney was marred by multiple tribunal appearances, including 6- and 7-week bans, and, while he starred in some upset wins, he spent more time off the field than on it, resulting in Barassi labelling the experiment as a disappointment, and he was not offered a contract extension.

=== Tony Lockett and grand final return: 1995–2001 ===
A big coup for the club was recruitment of St Kilda Football Club champion Tony "Plugger" Lockett in 1995. Lockett became a cult figure in Sydney, with an instant impact and along with the Super League war in the dominant rival rugby league football code in Australia, helped the Swans to become a powerhouse Sydney icon.

1995 would be Barassi's last year in charge. The Swans won eight games – as many as they did in the previous three seasons combined – and finished with a percentage of over 100. They were also one of only two teams to defeat the all-conquering Carlton side of that year. Captain Paul Kelly won the League's highest individual honour, the Brownlow Medal. Barassi left an improving team, a club in a much better state than he found them.

1996 AFL Home & Away Season	W	L	D	Total	%
Sydney Swans	16	5	1	66	123.9
	Minor Premiers

Former Hawthorn player Rodney Eade took over the reins in 1996 and after a slow start (they lost their first two games of the season), turned the club around into powerful force. The Swans ended the minor round on top of the premiership table with 16 wins, 5 losses and 1 draw. In the finals, the Swans won one of the most thrilling AFL preliminary finals in history after Plugger Lockett kicked a behind after the siren to win the game. The Swans lost the grand final to North Melbourne, which had been their first appearance in a grand final since 1945. The game was played in front of 93,102 at the MCG.

The Swans then made the finals for four of the next five full years that Rodney Eade was in charge. In 1998 they finished 3rd on the AFL ladder; despite beating St Kilda in their first final the Swans were then beaten by eventual premiers Adelaide in the semi-final at the SCG.

The 1999 season was a largely uneventful year for the club, the only real highlight being Tony Lockett kicking his record-breaking 1300th goal against Collingwood in Round 10. The 1999 season ended with a 69-point mauling at the hands of minor premiers Essendon.

After missing the finals in 2000, the Swans rebounded to finish 7th in 2001, but were beaten by Hawthorn by 55 points in their elimination final at Colonial Stadium.

=== Rebuilding and finals return: 2002–2004 ===
Former Swans favourite son Paul Roos was appointed caretaker coach midway through the 2002 season, replacing Rodney Eade who was removed after Round 12. Roos won six of the remaining 10 games that year (including the last four of the season) and was installed as the permanent coach from the 2003 season onwards, despite rumours that Sydney had nearly concluded a deal with Terry Wallace.

Roos continued a record as a successful coach with the Swans for the eight full seasons that would follow.

A new home ground at Stadium Australia provided increased capacity over the SCG. The Swans' first game played at the stadium in Round 9, 2002 against Essendon attracted 54,169 spectators. The Sydney Swans v Collingwood match on 23 August 2003 set an attendance record for the largest crowd to watch an AFL game outside of Victoria with an official attendance of 72,393 and was the largest home and away AFL crowd at any stadium for 2003. A preliminary final against the Brisbane Lions in 2003 attracted 71,019 people. The Swans lost all three of those significant matches.

2004 saw an average year for Sydney, however one highlight was when they ended St Kilda's undefeated start to the season in Round 11. The match was notable for Leo Barry's effort in nullifying the impact of St Kilda full-forward and eventual Coleman Medallist Fraser Gehrig, whom Barry restricted to only two possessions for the entire match

Sydney recruited Barry Hall from St Kilda. Like Lockett, Hall was a forward from St Kilda whose discipline and attitude had been questioned. Hall performed well at Sydney and later became a club leader.the new century dawned, Sydney implemented a policy of giving up high order draft picks in exchange for players who struggled at other clubs. It was during this era that the Swans picked up the likes of Paul Williams, Barry Hall, Craig Bolton, Darren Jolly, Ted Richards, Peter Everitt, Martin Mattner, Rhyce Shaw, Shane Mumford, Ben McGlynn and Mitch Morton, amongst others, and giving up higher order draft picks meant the Swans missed out on the likes of Daniel Motlop, Nick Dal Santo, James Kelly, Courtenay Dempsey and Sam Lonergan who went to Port Adelaide, St Kilda, Geelong and the latter two to Essendon respectively. This policy is said to have paid off in the Roos era, as they implemented a strict culture of discipline at the club.

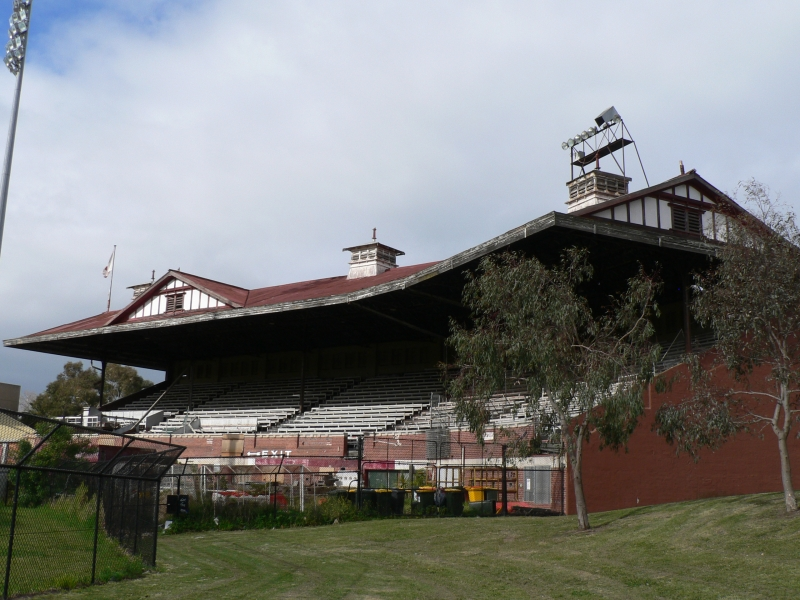
Derelict grandstand at Lake Oval. In 2005, the Swans launched a campaign to prevent its demolition of all that remains of its former home and restore it as a club museum.

=== Premiership glory: 2005 ===
In 2005, the Swans came under enormous public scrutiny, even from AFL CEO Andrew Demetriou, for their unorthodox, "boring" defense-oriented tactics that included tightly controlling the tempo of the game and starving the opposition of possession (in fact, seven teams that season had their lowest possession total while playing against the Swans). Swans coach Paul Roos maintained that playing contested football was the style used by all recent Premiership-winning teams, and felt that it was ironic that the much criticised strategy proved ultimately successful.

Nick Davis! Nick Davis! I don't believe it! I see it, but I don't believe it!

— Anthony Hudson's TV call of Nick Davis' fourth and match-winning goal in the semi-final against Geelong on Network Ten

Cox throws it onto the left, one last roll of the dice for the Eagles – Leo Barry, you star!...(Siren in background)...The longest Premiership drought in football history is over! For the first time in 72 years, the Swans are the champions of the AFL!"

— Stephen Quartermain's TV call of Leo Barry's match- and title-clinching mark on Network Ten

After finishing third during the regular season, the Swans lost the second qualifying final against the West Coast Eagles at Subiaco Oval on 2 September by 10.5 (65) to 10.9 (69). This dropped them into a semi-final against the Geelong Cats at the SCG on 9 September, and the Swans trailed the Cats 31–53 before Nick Davis kicked four consecutive goals, with the last one a matter of seconds before the siren, to win the game for Sydney by 7.14 (56) to 7.11 (53). In the first preliminary final at the MCG on 16 September against St Kilda, the Swans used a seven-goal blitz in 11 minutes of the fourth quarter to overturn an 8-point deficit and overrun the Saints by 15.6 (96) to 9.11 (65).

The Swans faced the Eagles in the AFL Grand Final on 24 September 2005, their first Grand Final appearance since 1996. The Swans prevailed by four points, final score 8.10 (58) to West Coast's 7.12 (54). In the last few minutes, the Sydney defence held strong, with Leo Barry marking the ball just before the siren to stop the Eagles' final desperate shot at goal. The Premiership was the Swans' first in 72 years and their first since being based in Sydney.

2005 AFL Grand Final	G	B	Total
Sydney Swans	8	10	58
West Coast Eagles	7	12	54
Venue: Melbourne Cricket Ground	Crowd: 91,898

On 30 September 2005, a ticker tape parade down Sydney's George Street was held in honour of the Swans' achievements, which ended with a rally at Sydney Town Hall, where Lord Mayor Clover Moore presented the team with the key to the city. The flag of the Swans also flew on top of the Sydney Harbour Bridge during the week; the same flag was later given to Premier of Western Australia Geoff Gallop to fly on top of the state legislature in Perth as part of the friendly wager between Gallop and Premier of New South Wales Morris Iemma.

Off the field the Grand Final success instigated moves to make the club sustainable in the long term and capitalise on the success to grow the code in the state. The Greater Sydney Australian Football Foundation Limited was formed, which would later become the Sydney Swans Foundation aimed initially at raising $5 million in funds to develop the Swans and the code in New South Wales. The Foundation has raised millions since its inception and helped keep the Swans sustainable in Sydney.

=== Grand final loss: 2006 ===
As reigning premiers, the Sydney Swans started the 2006 season slowly, losing three of their first four games, including in round one to an Essendon side that would finish near the bottom of the ladder with only three wins and a draw, and finish with the worst defensive record of any side for the season (Sydney, conversely, had the best defensive record of any side).

The 2006 AFL Grand Final was contested between the Sydney Swans and West Coast Eagles at the Melbourne Cricket Ground on 30 September 2006. The West Coast Eagles avenged their 2005 Grand Final defeat by beating the Sydney Swans by one point, only the fourth one-point grand final margin in the competition's history.

The rivalry between the Sydney Swans and West Coast Eagles has become one of the modern rivalries. The six games between the two sides (from the start of the 2005 finals to the first round of 2007 inclusive) were decided by a combined margin of 13 points. Four of those six games were finals and 2 grand finals.

=== Finals goal: 2007–2010 ===
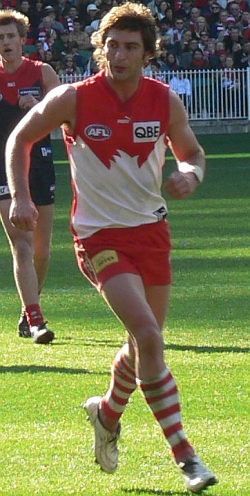
Brett Kirk, a New South Welshman, captained the side from 2005 to 2010 leading the club to its first premiership in 72 years

Sydney finished the 2007 home and away season in 7th place, and advanced to the finals, where they faced and were defeated by Collingwood by 38 points in the elimination final. It was their earliest exit from the finals since 2001 and was a culmination of a mostly disappointing season, as only victories against lesser teams saw them through to a fifth consecutive finals campaign.

The conclusion of the 2007 trade saw the loss of Adam Schneider and Sean Dempster to St Kilda, the delisting of Simon Phillips, Jonathan Simpkin and Luke Vogels, and the gain of Henry Playfair from Geelong and Martin Mattner from Adelaide.

The Swans spent the middle part of the 2008 season inside the top four, however a late form slump which yielded only three wins in the last nine rounds saw the Swans drop to sixth at the conclusion of the 2008 regular season. Having qualified for the finals for a sixth consecutive season, the Swans defeated North Melbourne in the elimination final before losing to the Western Bulldogs the following week.

2009 saw the club register only eight victories as they failed to reach the finals for the first time since 2002, finishing 12th with a percentage of below 100% for the first time since 1994. Barry Hall, Leo Barry, Jared Crouch, Michael O'Loughlin, Amon Buchanan and Darren Jolly all departed at the conclusion of the season, with Mark Seaby, Daniel Bradshaw and Shane Mumford, among others, joining the club during the trade period.

The 2010 season saw Sydney return to the finals by virtue of a fifth-place finish at the end of the regular season. The club defeated Carlton by five points in the elimination final before losing to the Western Bulldogs in the semi-finals for the second time in three seasons. The loss signalled the end of the Swans coaching career of Paul Roos as well as that of the playing career of Brett Kirk.

=== John Longmire era: 2011–2024 ===
2012 AFL Grand Final	G	B	Total
Sydney Swans	14	7	91
Hawthorn	11	15	81
Venue: Melbourne Cricket Ground	Crowd: 99,683
2014 AFL Grand Final	G	B	Total
Sydney Swans	11	8	74
Hawthorn	21	11	137
Venue: Melbourne Cricket Ground	Crowd: 99,460
2016 AFL Grand Final	G	B	Total
Sydney Swans	10	7	67
Western Bulldogs	13	11	89
Venue: Melbourne Cricket Ground	Crowd: 99,981
2022 AFL Grand Final	G	B	Total
Geelong	20	13	133
Sydney Swans	8	4	52
Venue: Melbourne Cricket Ground	Crowd: 100,024
2024 AFL Grand Final	G	B	Total
Sydney Swans	9	6	60
Brisbane Lions	18	12	120
Venue: Melbourne Cricket Ground	Crowd: 100,013

Former North Melbourne premiership-winning forward John Longmire took over as coach of the Swans as part of a succession plan initiated by Paul Roos in 2009 prior to the beginning of the 2011 season. He led the club to a seventh-place finish at the end of the regular season, therefore qualifying for the finals for the 13th time in the past 16 seasons. The Swans defeated St Kilda in an elimination final at Docklands Stadium before losing to Hawthorn in the semi-finals the following week.

It was during the regular season that the Swans caused the upset of the season, defeating the star-studded Geelong Cats on its home ground, Skilled Stadium, where the home tenant had won its past 29 games in succession, and its past two matches at the ground by a combined margin of 336 points, in Round 23. It was the Swans' first win over the Cats since 2006 and its first win at the ground since Round 8, 1999. The Swans were also the only team to defeat the West Coast Eagles at Patersons Stadium during the regular season. The Swans' victory over Geelong was overshadowed by the news that co-captain Jarrad McVeigh's baby daughter had died in the week leading up to the match, forcing him to miss that match.

==== 2012: Premiership year, Sydney becomes a two team town ====
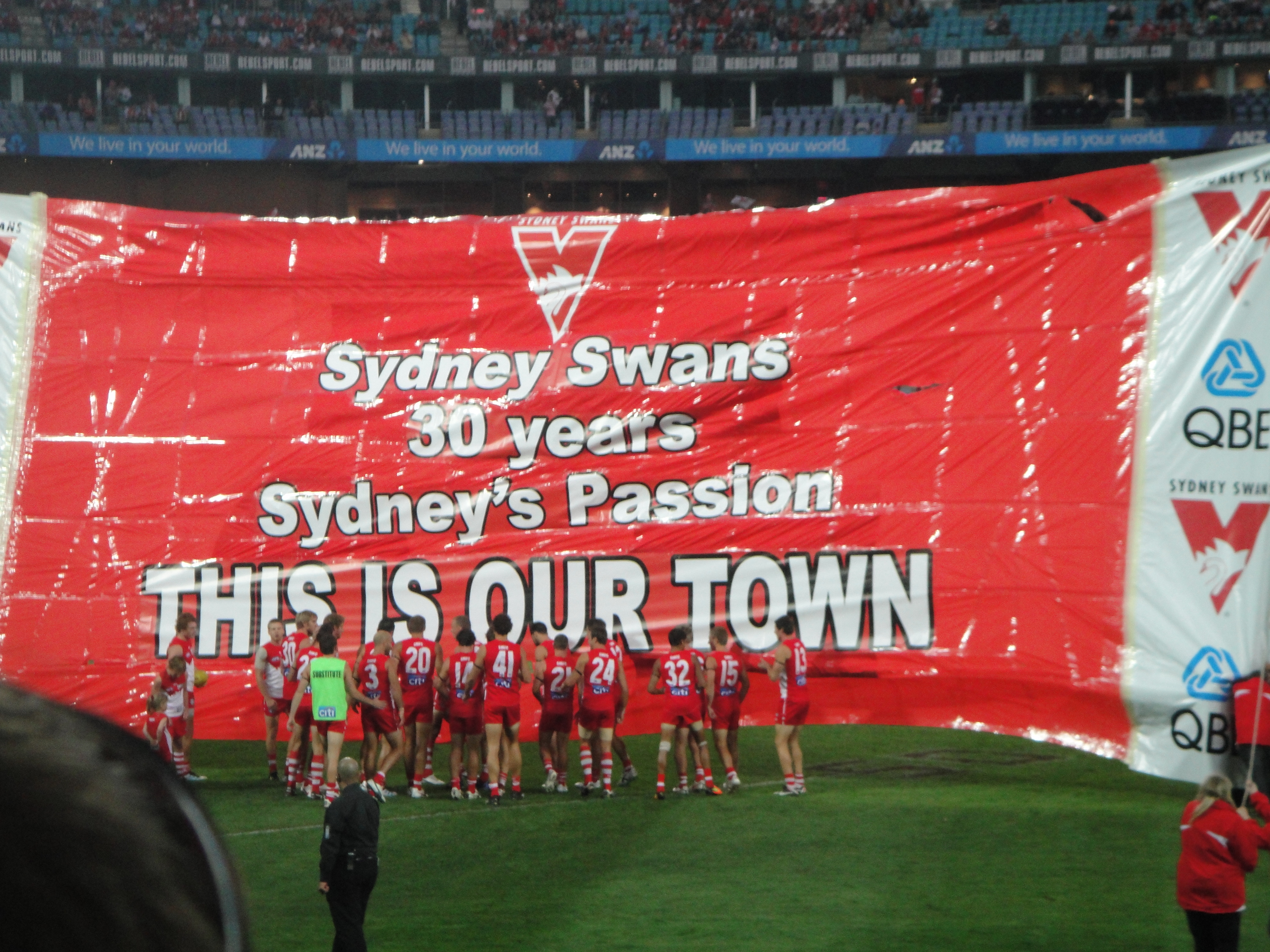
Sydney Swans players run through the banner before the inaugural Sydney Derby on 24 March 2012.

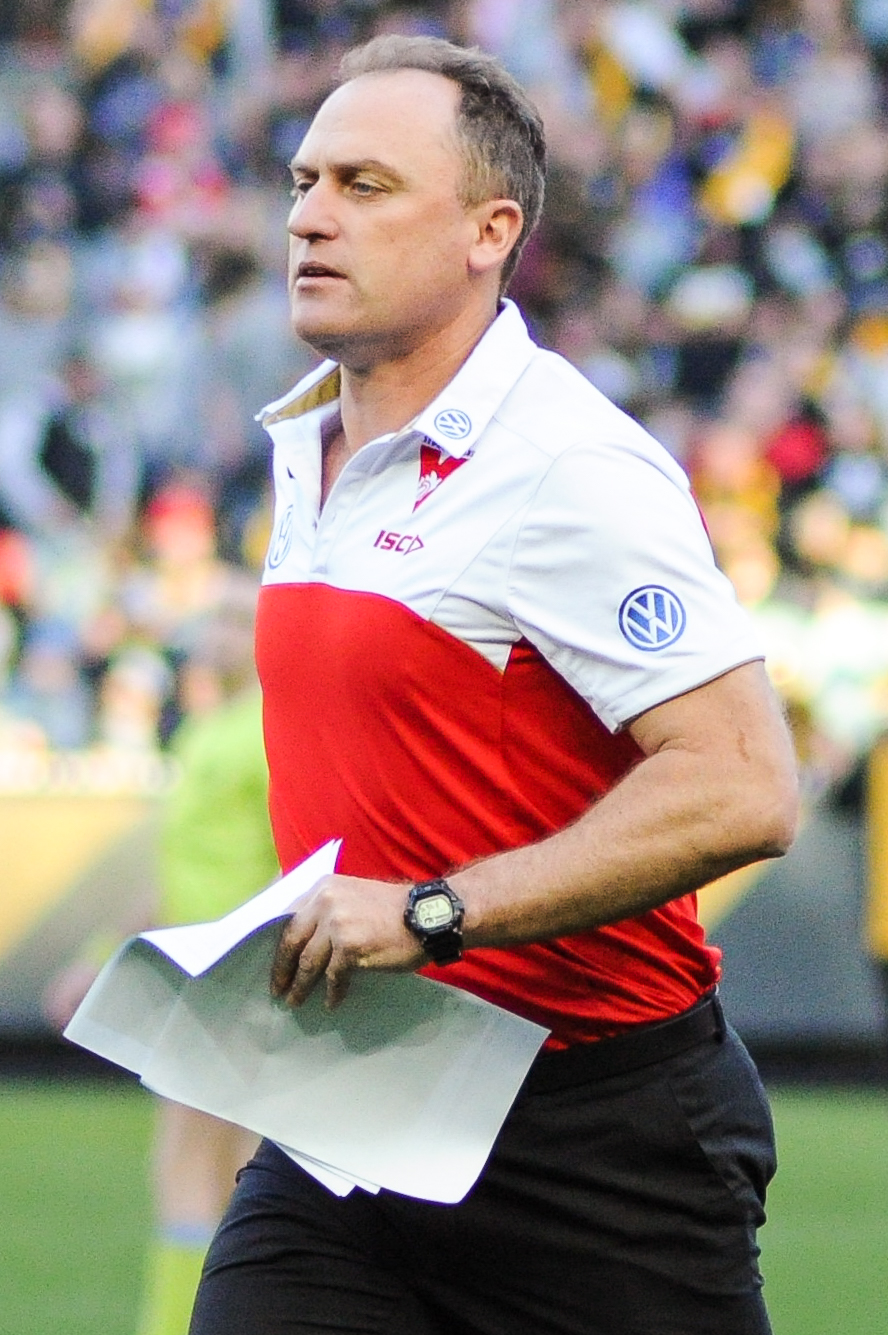
Coach John Longmire, a New South Welshman, led Sydney to a premiership in 2012

The 2012 season began for the Swans with the inaugural Sydney Derby against AFL newcomers Greater Western Sydney. After an even and physical first half, Sydney went on to win by 63 points. Subsequent wins over Fremantle, Port Adelaide, North Melbourne and Hawthorn saw the Swans sit second behind West Coast on percentage after Round 5, but the Swans would proceed to lose three of their next four matches before embarking on a nine-match winning streak between Rounds 10 and 19 inclusive. The Swans eventually finished the regular season in third place after losing three of their final four matches, all against their fellow top-four rivals (Collingwood, Hawthorn and Geelong in Rounds 20, 22 and 23 respectively).

The Swans defeated Adelaide by 29 points in their qualifying final at AAMI Stadium, thus earning a week off and a home preliminary final, where they then defeated Collingwood by 26 points to qualify for their first grand final since 2006, ending an eleven-match losing streak against the Magpies in the process.

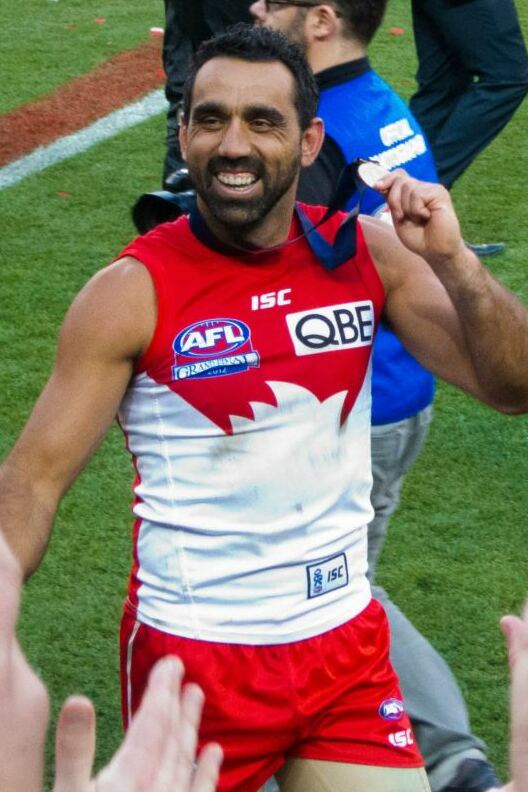
Adam Goodes served as captain between 2009 and 2012 leading the side to a premiership in 2012

In the grand final, the Swans defeated Hawthorn by ten points in front of 99,683 people at the MCG, with Nick Malceski kicking a snap goal with 34 seconds left to seal the Swans' fifth premiership and first since 2005. Ryan O'Keefe was named the Norm Smith Medallist and the Swans' best player in September.

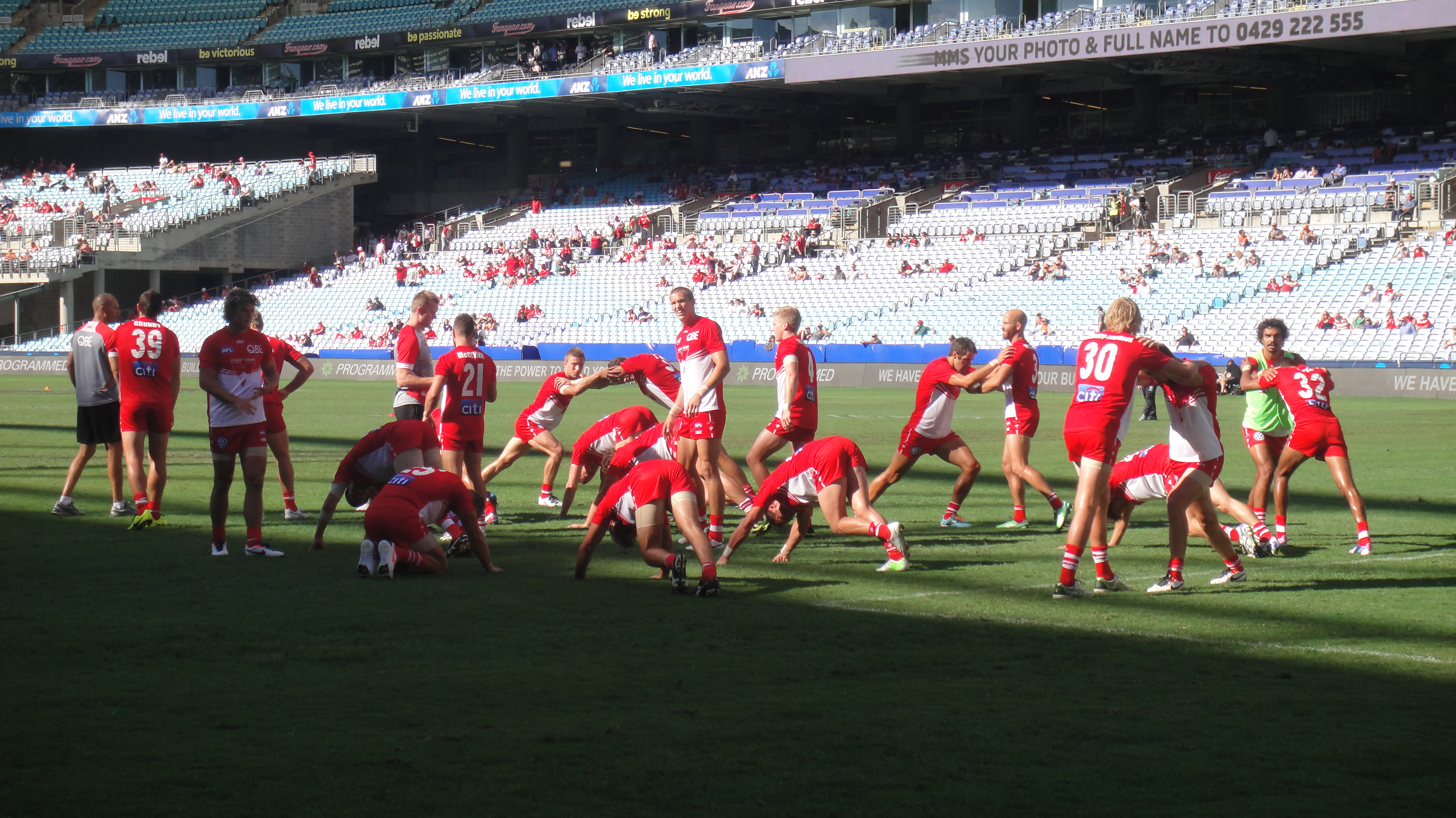
The Sydney Swans warm up before a match in 2013.

The Swans' 2013 season was marred by long-term injuries to many of its key players, namely Adam Goodes, Sam Reid, Lewis Jetta, Rhyce Shaw and Lewis Roberts-Thomson, among others; despite this setback, the team were still able to reach the finals for the fifteenth time in 18 seasons, reaching the preliminary finals where they were defeated by Fremantle at Patersons Stadium, its first loss at the venue since 2009.

==== 2014–2016: Grand final losses ====
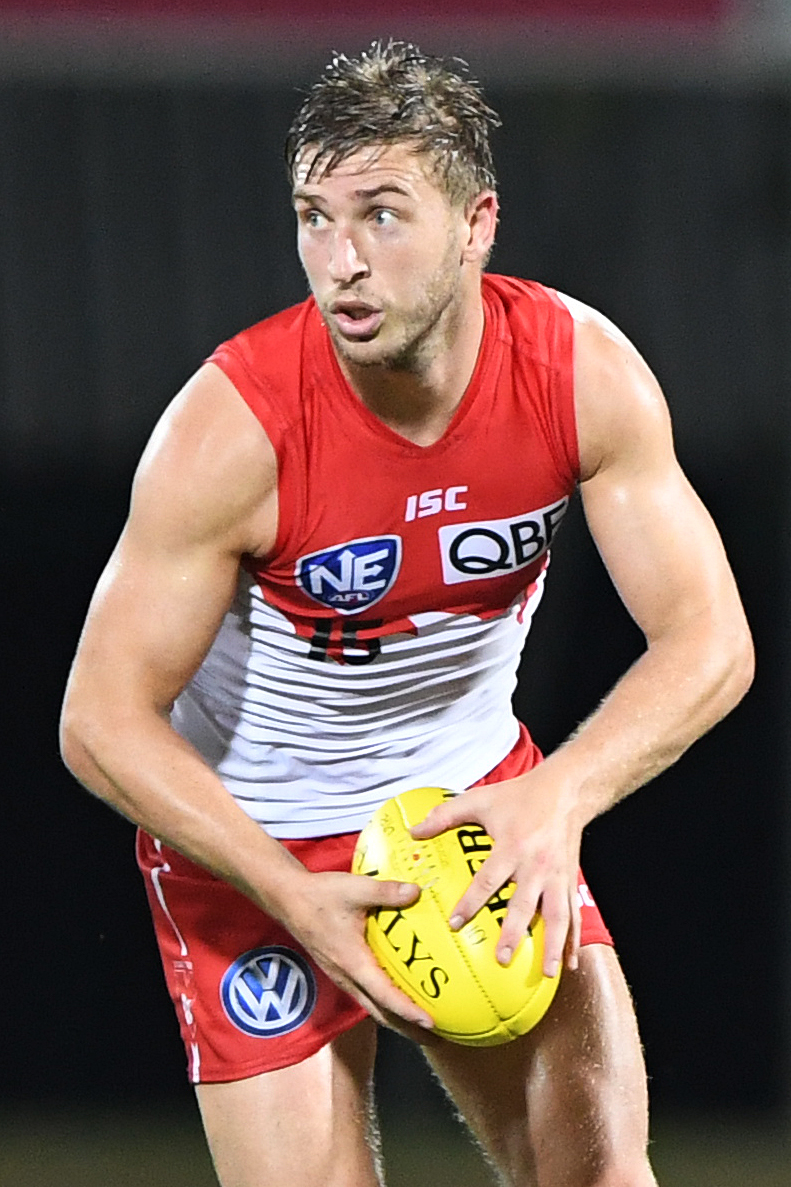
Kieren Jack, born and bred Sydneysider, served as captain between 2013 and 2016

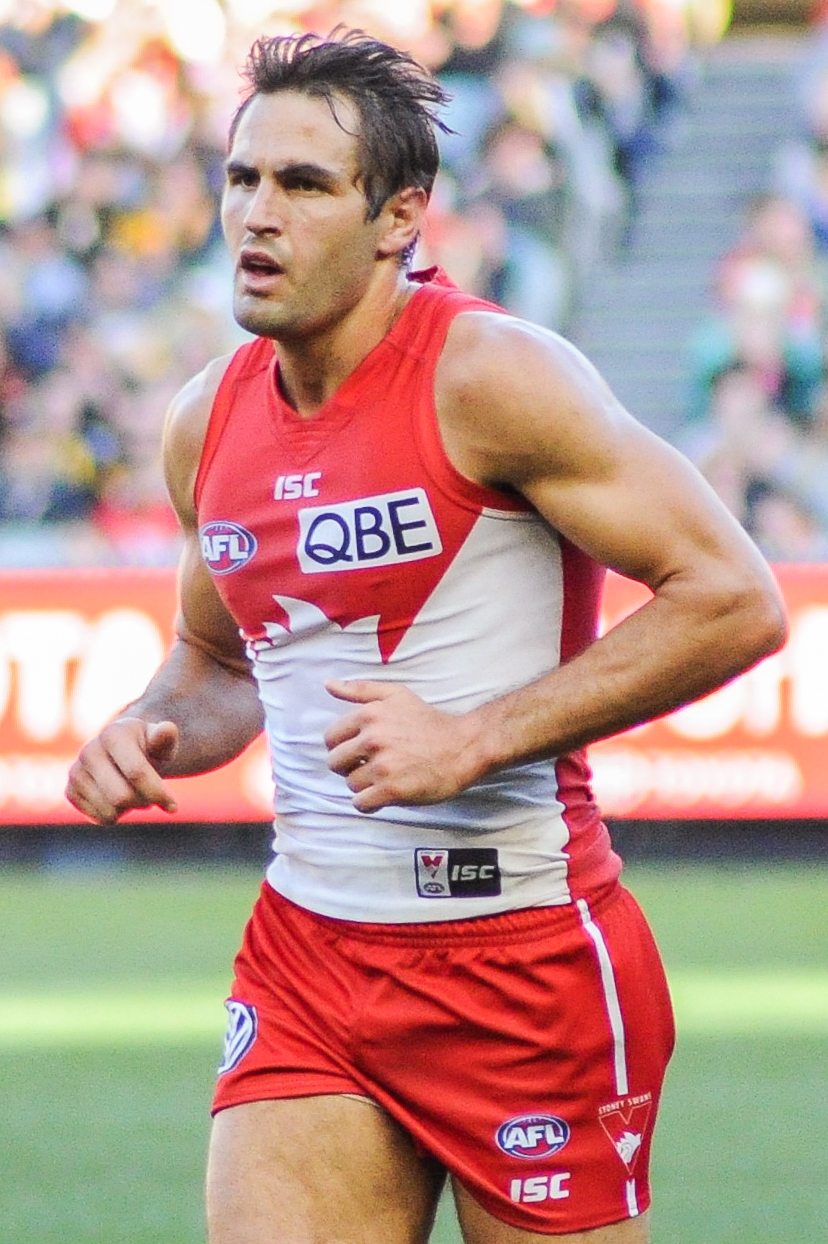
Josh Kennedy served as captain between 2017 and 2019

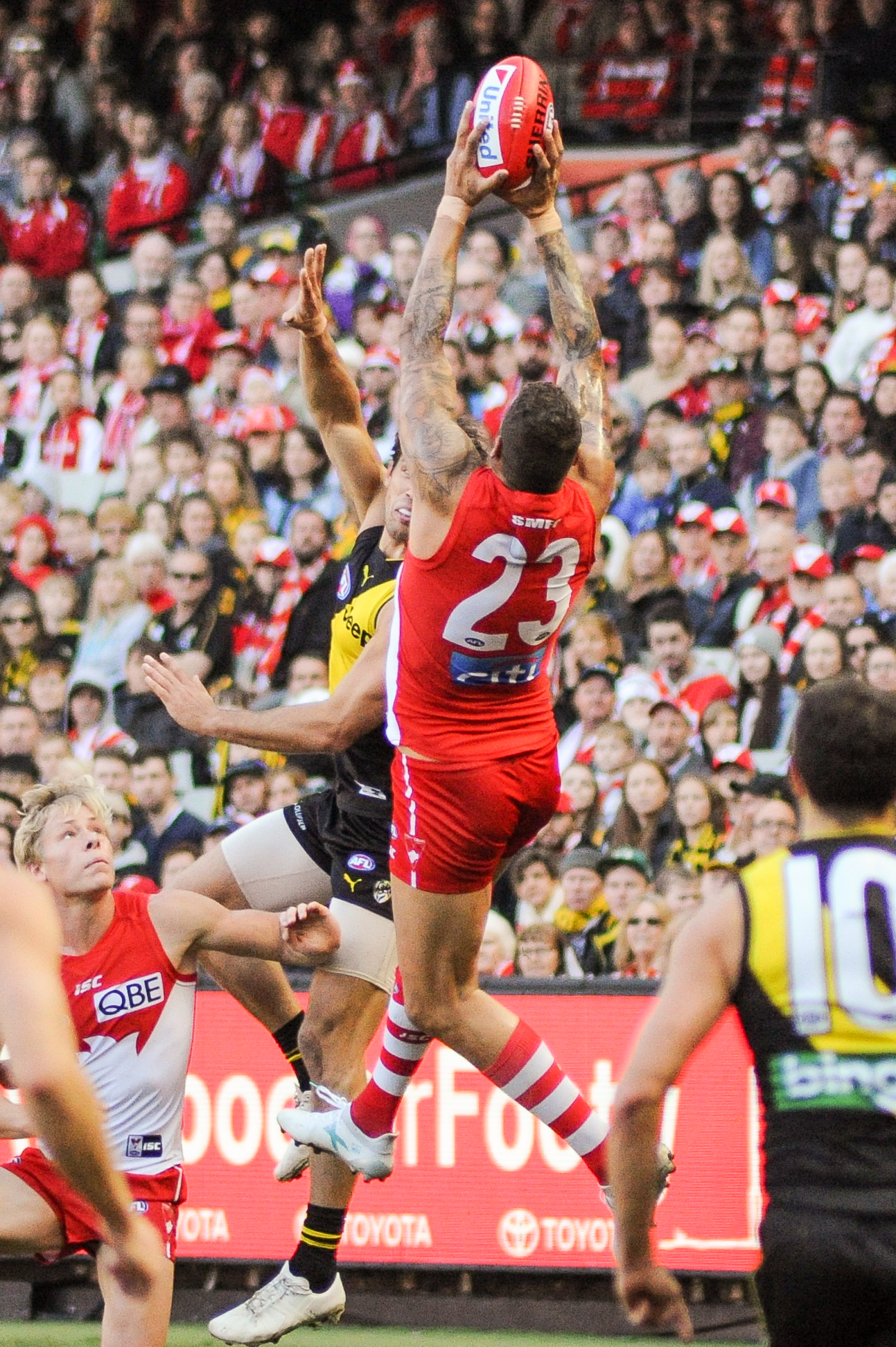
Lance "Buddy" Franklin marking in 2017. Franklin spearheaded the club at full forward between 2014 and 2023, becoming the third highest goalscorer in the club's history.

The 2014 AFL season began with some difficulties for the Swans. Sydney lost their first game against Greater Western Sydney and then to Collingwood before becoming the first non-South Australian team to win at Adelaide Oval defeating Adelaide by 63 points with Lance Franklin and Luke Parker kicking 4 goals each. After a loss to North Melbourne in Round 4, the Swans' won twelve games in a row, including victories against 2013 grand finalists Fremantle and Hawthorn, Geelong by 110 points at the SCG and then ladder leaders Port Adelaide. In Round 17, the Swans defeated Carlton to match a winning streak set three times in club history, the last of which came way back in 1935, and eventually closed out the season with their first minor premiership in 18 years and a club record 17 wins for the season, eclipsing the previous highest of 16, which was achieved on six past occasions in 2012, 1996, 1986, 1945, 1936 and 1935. In 2014 the Swans were minor premiers, and also qualified for the 2014 AFL Grand Final. They defeated Fremantle at home in the first qualifying final in Round one of the finals series and so earned a one-week break. In the first preliminary final the Swans had a convincing win against North Melbourne, which led them to their fourth grand final in 10 years. The 2014 AFL Grand Final was played on Saturday, 27 September 2014, in near perfect weather conditions, with Sydney seen as favourites leading up to the match. This was the first time in a finals series that former Hawk player Lance Franklin would play against his former team, one of very few players to have played back to back grand finals for two different teams. The Hawks dominated the game quite early and eventually defeated the Swans 11.8.(74) to 21.11.(137). The 63-point loss was Sydney's biggest ever loss in a grand final and their biggest defeat all season, meaning Hawthorn would become back to back premiers for the second time in their history.

The Swans started the 2015 AFL season well, winning their first three, before losing their next two games against Fremantle, where they trailed by as many as 8 goals before half-time, and the Western Bulldogs. They won their next 6 leading into the bye, including home wins against Geelong and North Melbourne, and an upset away win against Hawthorn in the grand final replay. The Swans lost their first game after the bye, their 3rd of the season to Richmond at the SCG, 11.11 (77) to 14.11. (95). The Swans rebounded with unconvincing wins against Port Adelaide and Brisbane Lions, before suffering their heaviest defeat for 17 seasons against the Hawks by 89 points. The following week was no better with a road trip to Perth and another loss, this time to the Eagles by 52 points, the scoreline ultimately flattering the Swans. The Swans bounced back against Adelaide with a convincing win 52-point win, but lost their next game to Geelong at Simmonds stadium; a close affair that Geelong blew apart in the 3rd quarter. The Swans won their final 4 games to secure a top 4 finish, against Collingwood, Greater Western Sydney, St Kilda and Gold Coast.

The Swans faced minor premiers Fremantle in the first qualifying final, their first finals match without Franklin, who had withdrawn from the finals due to illness. Ultimately the Swans would go down in a low-scoring affair, effectively kicking themselves out of the game after losing Sam Reid to a hamstring injury midway through the 2nd quarter. The following week the Swans were knocked out of the finals in a one-sided contest against North Melbourne, struggling to score throughout the first half with the game effectively over by half-time. For the first time since 2011, the Swans failed to make a preliminary final.

The Swans' continued period of success, in which it has missed the finals only three times since 1995, has led to some criticism about a salary cap concession which the club receives; the concession is in the form of an additional Cost of Living Allowance (COLA), due to the higher cost of living in Sydney compared with any other Australian city. It was, however, announced in March 2014 that this allowance would be scrapped. The trade ban was fought by the club before the 2015 season and a reprieve was won, with the AFL allowing the club to participate in the 2015 AFL draft. There was a catch however, with the league imposing an edict that the club could only recruit players at or below current average wage of $340,000 (adjusted figures for 2015 was $349,000). During the 2015 season, with the Swans team stretched by ageing players and injuries, it had become apparent that the trade restrictions that had prevented the Swans from participating in the 2014 draft, had impacted the list. With the trade period looming, Andrew Pridham lobbied the AFL to lift the trade restrictions, labeling the ban as a restraint of trade. In response to continued discussions between the club and league, as well as lobbying by the AFLPA, the league further relaxed the trade restrictions for the Swans during the 2015 AFL Finals. The AFL changed the sanctions so that the Swans could replace a player that leaves the club as either a free agent, or through trade, with another player on a contract up to $450,000 per year. This allowed the Swans to trade for Callum Sinclair in a swap deal, as well as trade a late pick for out-of-contract defender, Michael Talia from the Western Bulldogs.

The Swans started off the 2016 season with a convincing 80-point round 1 win against Collingwood, with new Swans recruit Michael Talia suffering a long-term foot injury. They followed up the next round with a 60-point win against the Blues, with new recruit Callum Sinclair kicking 3 goals. The following week they defeated GWS by 25 points, with Lance Franklin kicking 4 goals. In the following match against the Crows, Isaac Heeney starred with 18 touches and 4 goals in a losing side. Three more wins followed, against West Coast, Brisbane and Essendon respectively before a shock loss to Richmond in round 8 by a solitary point, after a kick after the siren. They bounced back to win against top spot North Melbourne, and the Hawks at the MCG, with Lance Franklin booting 3 goals, including a bomb from 80 metres. After a tight slog against the Suns, the Swans played the Giants once more and were defeated in the club's 100th game. They won their next game by 55 points against the Demons, in a fourth quarter breeze. After a bye in Round 14, the Sydney Swans lost their first game after, again with the last kick of the game, by 4 points. The week after was soured by a family feud involving co-captain Kieren Jack and his parents, after they were reportedly told by him not to come to is 200-game milestone. After the spat, Jack led the Swans to an emphatic upset victory against Geelong, booting 3 goals and gathering 24 possessions in the one-sided 38-point victory at Simonds Stadium. They then travelled back home where they faced Hawthorn and lost their 3rd match of the season by under a goal, as Buddy went goalless for the first time in the season. After an unconvincing win the following week against Carlton, the Swans went on to win their last 5 home and away games by a combined total of 349 points, giving them top spot and a home qualifying final.

Ahead of their first final against cross-town rivals the Giants, the Swans confirmed that they would play all home finals at the SCG except for Sydney Derbies, which would be played at Stadium Australia. The final would create history, being the first Sydney Derby to be played in a final. It was also the first time that the Giants would make the finals in their fifth year. In a low-scoring first half, the Swans were very competitive, trailing by only 2 points. However, a mark not paid to Isaac Heeney midway through the third quarter turned all the momentum the Giants way, as they kicked away to win by 36 points. The Swans only kicked 2 goals after half-time with Giant Jeremy Cameron outscoring them in the third quarter alone with 3 goals. They were quick to bounce back the following week, thumping the Adelaide Crows by 6 goals, with Franklin and Tom Papley kicking 4 goals a piece, after a blistering 7 goal to 1 quarter. The story was pretty much the same in the preliminary final against the Geelong Cats at the MCG. The Swans kept the Cats goalless for the first quarter, and were never really challenged in their 37-point triumph. It would take them to their third grand final in five years, against the Western Bulldogs at the MCG. After leading by a scant 2-point margin at half time, the Bulldogs pulled away towards the end of the fourth quarter to hand Sydney their second grand final loss in three years.

The Swans began the 2017 season with six straight losses, after being upset at home by Port Adelaide in the opening round, they were upset by Collingwood and Carlton, and suffered defeats to the Western Bulldogs, Greater Western Sydney (who won their first game at the SCG) and West Coast Eagles (in Perth). However, they managed to win 13 of their last 15, losing both their games to Hawthorn by 1 goal. Some of their best wins include against the reigning premiers the Bulldogs, GWS, and comeback wins against Richmond and Essendon. After becoming the first grand-finalist to lose their first six games, they have become the first team to reach the finals after starting the season 0–6. They would comprehensively defeat Essendon in their first final, before slumping to an ugly defeat against Geelong, ending their season.

The Swans had an indifferent 2018, compounded by their struggles at home, losing 5 out of 11 games at the SCG. A lean patch of form which included upset losses to Gold Coast (for the first time ever) and Essendon (for the first time since 2011) had them looking likely to miss finals altogether; however, three out of four wins in the last four rounds was enough to see them into their ninth consecutive finals series, where they were comprehensively beaten by GWS in the elimination finals.

The Swans' golden era of finals appearances came to an end in 2019. They missed the finals for the first time in a decade, finishing 15th on the ladder with 8 wins and 14 losses. They started the season poorly with just one win in their first seven matches, although they would briefly recover after winning five of the next seven games. Six losses on the trot ended any chance of a tenth consecutive finals appearance, but strong wins over also-rans Melbourne and St Kilda in the final two rounds ensured the season ended on a positive note.

==== 2016–present: Pride Games ====
In 2015, a pre-season Pride Game was played at Drummoyne Oval between the Swans and the Fremantle Dockers. From the following year, it became an annual fixture marking the club's support for the LGBTQIA+ community. The annual Pride Games are currently only played between the Swans and St Kilda. As of November 2023 the AFL had no plans to introduce a Pride Round, although the AFLW Pride Round was established in 2018.

==== 2020s: Return to finals ====
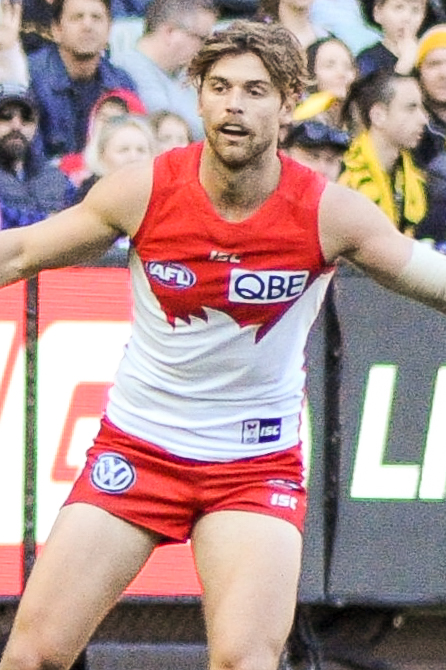
Dane Rampe, Sydney born and raised, has been a club captain between 2019 and 2023

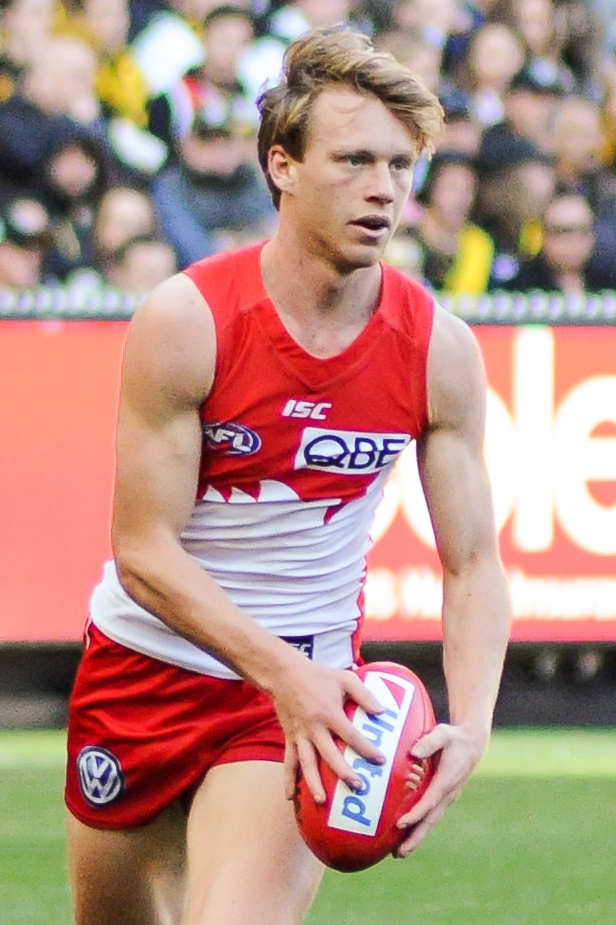
Callum Mills, Sydney born and raised was named sole captain in 2024

The Swans won their first match of the interrupted 2020 season against Adelaide at the Adelaide Oval by three points, but won only four more games for the season, missing the finals in consecutive seasons for the first time since 1994–95. The 16th-place finish was also the lowest in club history.

After two seasons out of the finals, the Swans rebounded to great effect in 2021. An excellent first month of the season, which saw them upset Brisbane and reigning premiers Richmond, set up a strong home-and-away campaign. Seven wins in their final eight games saw Sydney secure sixth position with a 15–7 win-loss record, just percentage outside the top four, but their year came to a premature end in the finals after a heartbreaking one-point loss to crosstown rival Greater Western Sydney in the second elimination final. The players felt as though they had more to give, and were overcome with disappointment knowing that they had no finals win to show for it, in a season which had otherwise been a massive step in the right direction.

In 2022, the Swans backed up their meteoric rise up the ladder with another promising start, winning five of their first six matches. This included a 30-point win against Geelong in Round 2, which involved Lance Franklin kicking his 1000th career goal, sparking one of the biggest pitch invasions in AFL history. After a mid-year slump, in which the Swans lost winnable games against Gold Coast, Port Adelaide and Essendon, they finished the home-and-away season with seven wins in a row, securing a top-4 berth for the first time since 2016.

In the 2022 finals series, the Swans beat Melbourne by 22 points at the Melbourne Cricket Ground to lock in a home preliminary final. The Swans played Collingwood in the preliminary final and won by a single point, qualifying to play in their fourth grand final in 12 years under Longmire.

On 24 September, the Swans were defeated by Geelong by 133 points to 52 in the 2022 AFL Grand Final.

In 2023 the Swans started well winning their opening two matches and on top of the ladder. A mid season slump saw them drop to as low as 15th but they turned it around winning six in a row to qualify for the finals.

In 2024, the Swans finished the season on top of the ladder with a record of 17–6. This gave them the minor premiership, their first since 2016. They defeated GWS in the Qualifying Final and Port Adelaide in the Preliminary Final to qualify for their 7th Grand Final of the 21st century and their 5th under John Longmire. However they were defeated by the Brisbane Lions in the 2024 Grand Final 120 to 60.

On 26 November 2024, a few months after his fourth grand final loss, John Longmire decided to announce his resignation as senior coach of Sydney Swans and hand the senior coach role to assistant coach Dean Cox.

=== Dean Cox era: 2025–present ===
Former West Coast, six-time All-Australian, premiership-winning ruckman Dean Cox was appointed the 45th head coach of the Sydney Swans ahead of the 2025 AFL season. At a press conference in December 2024, Cox flagged improvements to defence and contested work, which he described as "really poor" in the 2024 Grand Final. He also confirmed that key defender Tom McCartin had trained as a forward during much of the preseason. The club conducted a seven-and-a-half-hour review of the Grand Final loss, including one hour devoted to the opening minute of the match. Cox reinforced his approach of "challenging" the playing group with back-to-back 2 km time trials in February.

The early stages of the 2025 season were affected by an expanded injury list, including key players Callum Mills, Errol Gulden, Brodie Grundy, Tom Papley, Logan McDonald, and six other players. The Swans lost in Opening Round at the SCG to Hawthorn by 20 points, with Cox acknowledging post-match that he had "gotten some things wrong." The following week, Sydney lost at home once again, this time by 4 points to Brisbane in a Grand Final rematch.

The first win during the Cox era came in Round 2, with a 3-point victory over Fremantle at Optus Stadium. After a bye, the Swans defeated North Melbourne by 63 points in Round 4, but lost during Gather Round to Collingwood by 31 points. Media sources described Sydney's second-quarter performance as "unacceptable," with the team recording a pressure rating of 139 amid a run of Collingwood goals.

Extended conceding runs continued throughout the season, including Round 7 against Gold Coast (12 goals to none), Round 11 against Melbourne (12 goals to 6), Round 12 (12 goals to none) and Round 20 against GWS (11 goals to none). In Round 10, the Swans contested their annual Marn Grook Game against Carlton, regaining a first-quarter lead in the final term to win by 16 points.

Sydney suffered its largest home defeat since 1998 in Round 12, losing 90 points to Adelaide at the SCG on 31 May. Cox described the performance as "unacceptable and embarrassing," adding:

"For a team that played desperate, uncompromising, ruthless football, and that (tonight) was far from it, so we need to strip it back and get to work real quick."

Fans engaged in bronx cheering during the second quarter, which commentator Anthony Hudson called "Humiliating," while Adelaide's Wayne Milera labelled the Swans "a bit of a rabble," for which the Adelaide Football Club later apologised.

The following morning, the squad held an impromptu dawn training session at Clovelly Beach, including push-ups and sit-ups, later reported to have been initiated by the club leaders and players. The following week Dane Rampe stated the players had "let him (Cox) down" and that Milera's comment was "not far from the truth."

Sydney rebounded with a 44-point win over Richmond in Round 13. After the midseason bye, key players Errol Gulden and Tom Papley returned for a 19-point victory against Port Adelaide in Round 15. The Swans won six of their final nine games, but finals hopes ended in Round 20 with a 44-point loss to GWS at Engie Stadium, ending a five-match winning streak against the Giants.

Cox trialled a faster playing style in Round 22 in the second Grand Final rematch against Brisbane, during which Isaac Heeney scored an equal career-best five goals. Sydney led by 20 points in the penultimate minute, but held on to win by just two as Brisbane rapidly kicked the final three goals.

Ahead of Round 22, former Fremantle captain and broadcaster Matthew Pavlich was announced as the club's new CEO, replacing Tom Harley who had been announced earlier in the season as the incoming Chief Operating Officer for the AFL. Sydney's Round 21 Pride Game resulted in a 14-point win over Essendon. The contest was affected by rain and marked by far the Swans' lowest home attendance of the season (20,805). It was also the first time that pride game was contested against a team other than St Kilda, who proposed the original concept.

Member Thank You Round was celebrated in Round 23, at the final home game for the season, which ended in a 43-point loss to Geelong. The season concluded with a 67-point win over West Coast at Optus Stadium, Cox's first time coaching against his former club.

Sydney finished tenth overall, with a 12–11 record, a 5–6 record at home, and a percentage of 97, marking just their fifth finals absence since 2000. Isaac Heeney was selected as an All-Australian for the third time in his career, also winning a second consecutive Bob Skilton Medal. Teammate Brodie Grundy made the 44-man All-Australian squad.

In the offseason, Sydney made several staff changes ahead of the 2026 season. Long term head of National Recruitment Manager Kinnear Beatson transitioned to the Swans Academy, replaced by John Giramondo and Chris Keane. 2021 Premiership winning former Melbourne Coach Simon Goodwin was appointed in a new role called Director of Coaching & Performance. Former Swans player and VFL coach Jeremy Laidler returned to the club as an AFL assistant coach, alongside former Gold Coast GM of Football Wayne Campbell, who was appointed head of the Swans Academy. Swans 2012 Premiership player Nick Malceski was announced as coach of the VFL team, replacing former Swans teammate Jarrad McVeigh. In November 2025, it was announced that inaugural Swans AFLW coach Scott Gowans, resigned from the role after a ninth-place finish. He was replaced by Irish-born former player Colin O'Riordan, who played 34 games for the Sydney Swans, before transitioning to a role in coaching.

During the 2025 AFL Trade Period, Sydney acquired dual Coleman Medalist Charlie Curnow from Carlton in exchange for Oliver Florent and Will Hayward, with Hayward reporting to AFL.com.au that the move "probably could've been handled better." The Swans also successfully recruited Jai Serong (Hawthorn) and Malcolm Rosas (Gold Coast), both of whom requested trades to Sydney.

==== 2026 season and player suspensions ====
The Swans improved throughout the 2026 season, recording all but one of its opening 13 matches of the season on the way to securing a top-four finish in the home-and-away season. Following the round 23 victory against Essendon, which secured the team a second-place finish with one game remaining in the home-and-away season, several players were involved in an alleged incident at a hotel in East Melbourne. The matter was investigated by Victoria Police, though charges were not laid. Several days after the incident, the club suspended players Riley Bice, Nick Blakey, Isaac Heeney, James Jordon and Chad Warner for the remainder of the season.

==== 2026 onwards ====
Following the club's self-imposed season ending bans on the five players, the side rallied to record an unexpected victory in the qualifying final against the Brisbane Lions, though were defeated in the preliminary final by Fremantle. The club's women's team also recorded a preliminary final finish, which gave the club its fourth McClelland Trophy, and first since the award was combined to recognise the men's and women's competition.

== Club identity ==
The club's on-field nickname, the Swans, was suggested by a Herald and Weekly Times artist in 1933 in reference to the number of Western Australians in the team (the black swan being the state emblem of Western Australia). It was formally adopted by the club before the following season of 1934. The name is also thought to refer to the population of black swans in the Albert Park Lake, near the team's original home ground, South Melbourne Cricket Ground. The Chicago Swans are affiliated with the club and share a similar logo.

=== Uniforms ===
The jumper is white with a red back and a red yoke with a silhouette of the Sydney Opera House at the point of the yoke. The Opera House design was first used at the start of the 1987 season, replacing the traditional red "V" on white design. Until 1991, the back of the jumper was white with the yoke only extending to the back of the shoulders and each side of the jumper had a red vertical stripe. The current predominantly red design appeared at the start of the 1992 season. The club's major sponsor is QBE Insurance. In 2004 the club added the initials 'SMFC' in white lettering at the back of the collar to honour the club's past as South Melbourne Football Club. The move was welcomed by Melbourne-based fans. From 2011 to 2021, the clash guernsey was a predominantly white version of the home guernsey similar to the original Opera House guernsey design, including a white back, but was rarely used, since the two Queensland clubs (the Brisbane Lions and Gold Coast Suns) and cross town rivals GWS Giants are the only clubs with which there is a clash. As of 2023 in addition to being used in games in Victoria unless there is a clash, the red "V" is used as a clash guernsey against Gold Coast and Brisbane.

Nike is the current manufacturer of the Swans' apparel. Previous manufacturers were Puma (from mid-1990s to 2009) and ISC (2010 to 2020).

==== Evolution ====
Uniform Evolution
Design	Period	Description and history
	1874–1879	The club's original guernsey. A blue and white hoop design, with blue shorts.
	1880–1904	The same hoop design, but utilising the modern Red and White colour scheme for the guernsey, from the merger with Albert Park. Retains the blue shorts from its predecessor.
	1905–1906	A red and white guernsey, with a vertical "bar" design. A one-off jumper based on this design was utilised in 1996, for the Centenary Celebration Round.
	1907–1911; 1913–1919; 1923–1931	A white guernsey base, with a red "sash". The sash goes from the left shoulder to the right hip. A one-off version of this guernsey was worn in 2018 to commemorate the 100th anniversary of the 1918 premiership.
	1912	A reversed form of the same sash guernsey, with the sash going from the right shoulder to the left hip.
	1920–1922	A full red guernsey with white shorts. Bore the SMFC monogram on its front.
	1932–1974	A white guernsey bearing a red chevron, paired with black shorts. Worn in 2003 for the first AFL Heritage Round.
	1975–1986, 2021–present	The same guernsey design, but with red shorts instead of black. Used on numerous occasion for heritage purposes, such as for Heritage Rounds between 2004 and 2007. Was worn for part of the 2021 season, due to the club's temporary relocation to Melbourne and since the 2022 season, is used as an away guernsey for games in Victoria as well as an alternate against Gold Coast and Brisbane.
	1987–present	A white guernsey, with a red panel at the top. The red panel is cut in a manner to allow the Sydney Opera House to appear on the guernsey. Paired with red shorts.

=== Club song ===
In the 1930s, the South Melbourne Swans song was an adaptation of "Springtime in the Rockies." A newspaper article from 1932 also documents that the club sang themed parodies of "Mademoiselle from Armentières" and "You Will Remember Vienna", the theme from the film Viennese Nights.

In 1951, "Cheer, Cheer Red and the White" was officially adopted. The melody originated from the "Victory March" fight song of the Notre Dame Fighting Irish, which Australian audiences had heard in the 1940 film Knute Rockne, All American.

The encouraging phrase "Up there, Cazaly", referring to South Melbourne player Roy Cazaly, was first used by club fans in the 1920s before entering the Australian lexicon in general, especially after World War II. This later inspired the 1979 Mike Brady song "Up There Cazaly" which is today associated with Australian rules football in general and performed at every Grand Final. In 1982, when the Swans relocated to Sydney, the official club song was changed to a rewritten version entitled "Up There for Sydney." This was used intermittently until the mid-1990s, when "Cheer, Cheer the Red and the White" was reinstated. It remains the club song to this day.

In March 2021, the "Cheer, Cheer" lyrics were changed from "while our loyal sons are marching" to "while our loyal Swans are marching" in order to be inclusive of the AFLW team.

=== Home ground and training base ===
The club's original home ground was Lakeside Oval, when they were known as the South Melbourne Football Club from 1879 until 1981.

Since the 2016 AFL season, the Swans have played all their home games at the Sydney Cricket Ground, a 48,000 capacity venue located in inner-east suburb of Moore Park. The venue has been home to Swans home games since the club's relocation to Sydney in 1982. In the years 2002–2015, the Swans played between three and four home matches per season and most home finals matches at Stadium Australia (commercially known as ANZ Stadium), an 80,000 capacity stadium located in the west of the city. During the first five years at the ground average crowds were high, but issues with the surface as well as fan and player disengagement resulted in the club ending its association with the venue.

The club also trains on the SCG during the season and had its indoor training facilities and offices located within the stadium. During the off-season, when the ground is configured for cricket, the Swans train on the adjacent Tramway Oval (previously known as Lakeside Oval) also located within the Moore Park precinct. The oval is located less than one hundred metres from the SCG and since undergoing a redevelopment in 2018/19, has the same dimensions as the Docklands Stadium in Melbourne. The Swans NEAFL/reserves team have played some home matches at the oval, which has grassed hills and standing areas for several hundred spectators.

In October 2018 the club announced it would shift all offices and indoor training facilities to Moore Park's Royal Hall of Industries sometime in the early-to-mid 2020s, after announcing a $55 million deal with the New South Wales Government to redevelop the Hall. The club pulled out of the agreement in April 2020 due to the financial implications of the COVID-19 pandemic. In August 2021, the Swans announced it had re-negotiated a lease with the government to immediately commence the project. The facility provides indoor training facilities and administration for the Swans AFL, VFL and AFLW teams. The club began moving into the facility in December 2022. It was formally opened by the Prime Minister and New South Wales Premier in June 2023. The facility includes an indoor training field, gym, wet recovery area, medical amenities, a retail store, commercial kitchen, media studio, auditorium, learning centre, office space and a rooftop terrace, while the newly built adjoining building includes an international standard multi-purpose indoor sports court.

== Rivalries ==
=== Greater Western Sydney ===
The introduction of the GWS Giants to the AFL in 2012 resulted in the formation of the Sydney Derby. The Swans compete against their cross-city rivals twice every season. The best performed player from every derby match is awarded the Brett Kirk Medal.

Initially, the rivalry was a one-sided affair in favour of the Swans, who won 8 of the first 9 derbies. However, it has become more competitive in recent years, with the Giants winning 5 of the 7 most recent derbies. The Swans have also played the Giants in four finals matches, losing three of them.

=== West Coast Eagles ===
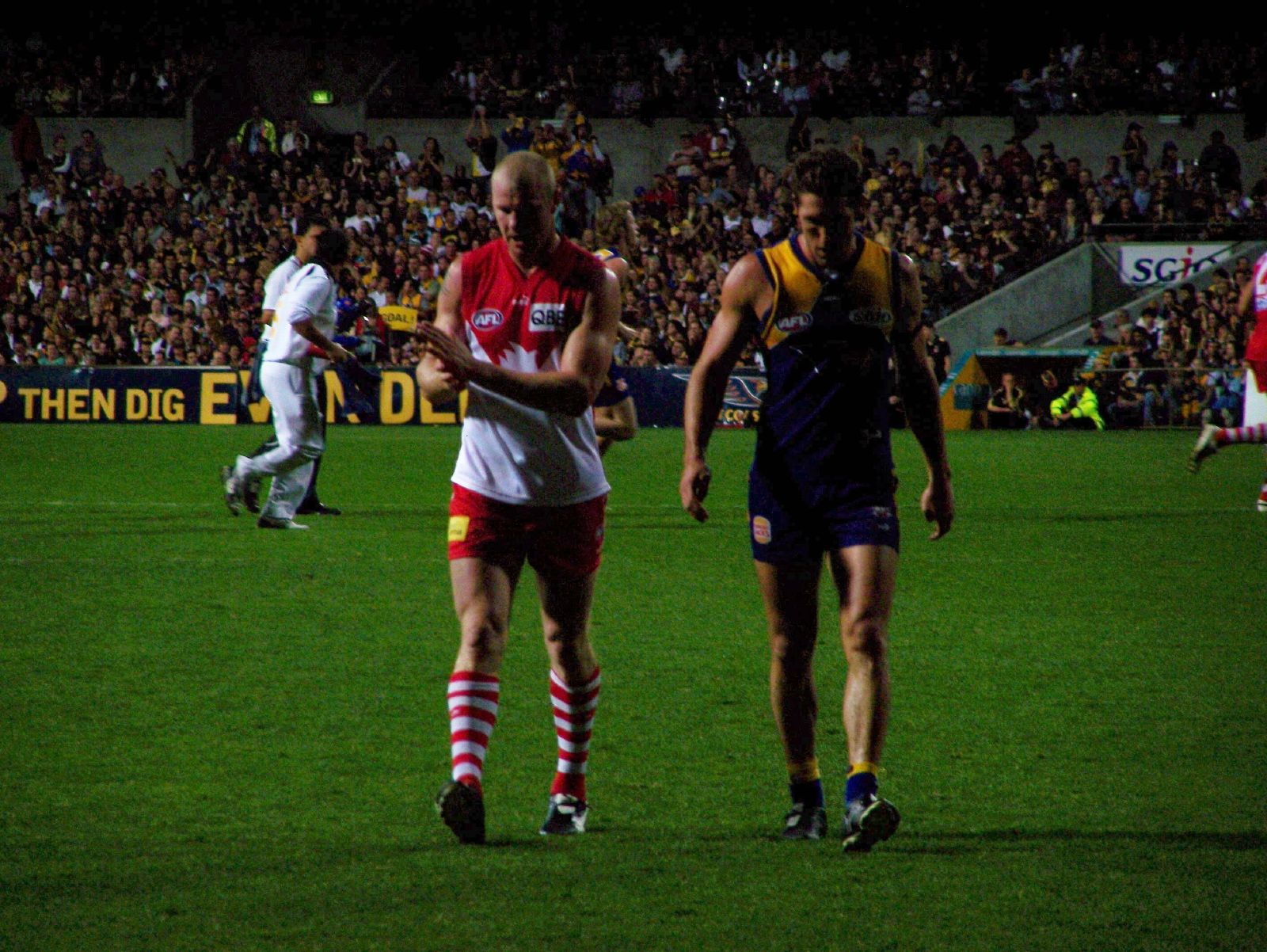
Barry Hall and Darren Glass

The Swans developed a famous modern rivalry against the Perth-based West Coast Eagles between 2005 and 2007, when six consecutive games between the two teams, including two qualifying finals and two grand finals, were decided by less than a goal. The rivalry was highlighted by Sydney's four-point win against West Coast in the 2005 Grand Final, and West Coast's one-point win against Sydney in the 2006 Grand Final.

=== Hawthorn ===
The rivalry with Hawthorn has been more recent, mostly defined by two grand finals (2012 and 2014). The Swans beat Hawthorn in 2012 by 10 points to claim their fifth premiership. The rivalry grew in 2013, when Hawthorn forward Lance Franklin transferred to the Swans as a free agent on a nine-year, $10 million deal. In 2014, the Swans finished minor premiers and were favourites to win the grand final, however were defeated by 63 points. Both teams have had close games since their grand final encounters, with their matches often finishing within single digit margins.

== Men's team ==
=== Current squad ===
Sydney Swans · AFL personnel
Playing list		Inactive list	Coaching staff
1 Chad Warner; 2 Hayden McLean; 4 Brodie Grundy; 5 Isaac Heeney (vc); 6 Logan McDonald; 7 Harry Cunningham; 8 James Rowbottom; 9 Jesse Dattoli; 10 Malcolm Rosas; 11 Tom Papley; 12 Angus Sheldrick; 13 Jai Serong; 14 Callum Mills (c); 15 Sam Wicks; 16 Braeden Campbell; 17 James Jordon; 18 Jevan Phillipou; 19 Peter Ladhams; 20 Riak Andrew; 21 Errol Gulden; 23 Ned Bowman; 25 Billy Cootee	26 Riley Bice; 27 Justin McInerney; 28 Will Edwards; 29 Joel Hamling*; 30 Tom McCartin; 31 Max King; 32 Harry Kyle; 33 Caiden Cleary; 34 Matthew Roberts; 35 Charlie Curnow; 37 Corey Warner; 39 Liam Hetherton*; 40 Tom Hanily*; 41 Patrick Snell; 42 Noah Chamberlain*; 43 Lewis Melican; 44 Jake Lloyd*; 45 Will Green; Mitch Knevitt; Mason McGroder; Caylen Murray; Brady Wright		Senior coach: Dean Cox; Assistant coaches: Ben Mathews (senior assistant); Amon Buchanan (assistant); Jeremy Laidler (assistant); Adam Kennedy (development); Paddy McCartin (development); Andrew Boston (development); Legend: (c) captain; (vc) vice-captain; * rookie; Updated: 22 November 2026; Sources: Players, coaches

== Women's team ==
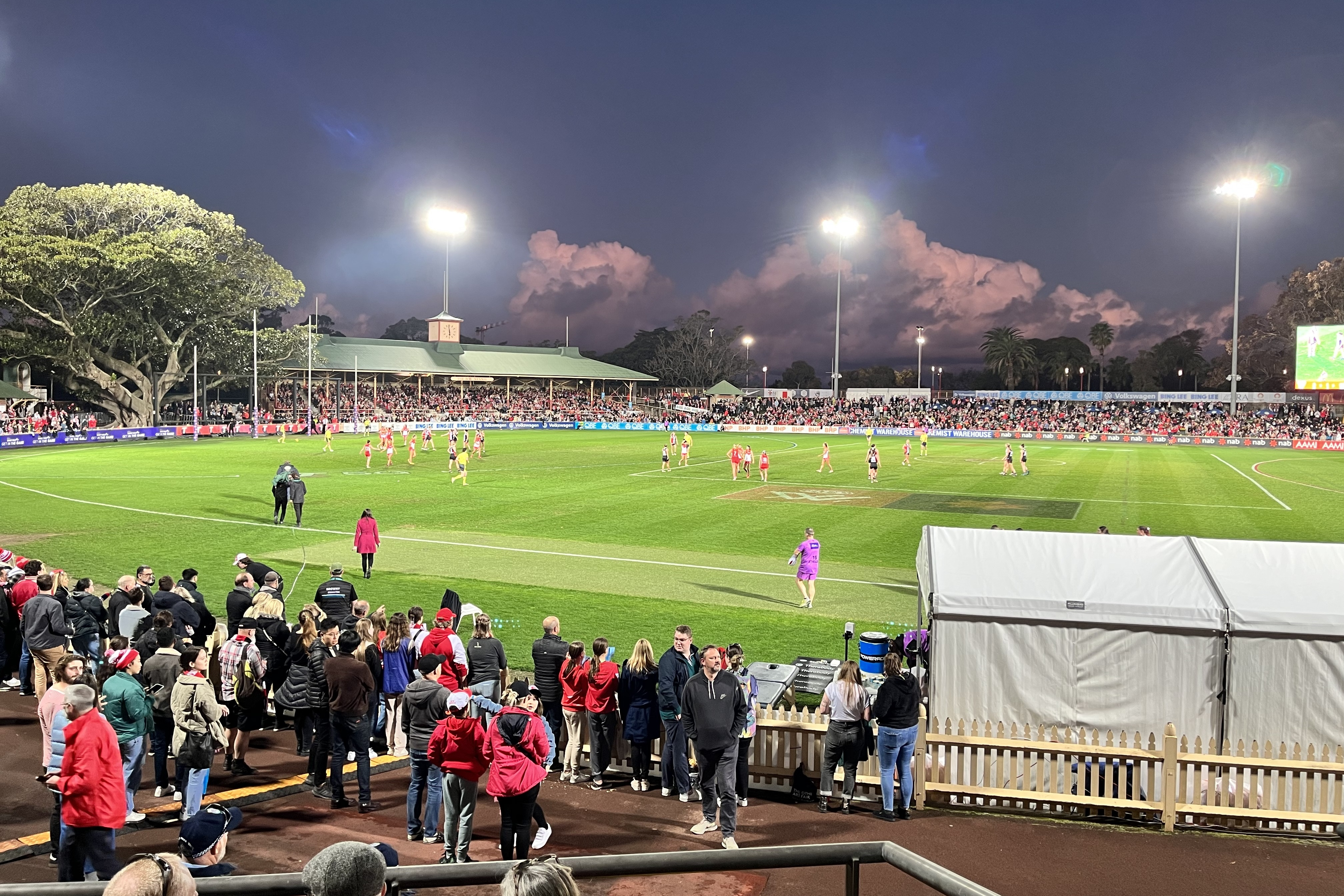
The Sydney Swans women's first home game at the North Sydney Oval on 27 August 2022 set a new record crowd for women's Australian rules football in New South Wales with 8,264 in attendance.

The Sydney Swans women's team was founded for the 2016 exhibition series; however, they did not bid for AFLW entry until 2022. Following the granting of an official AFLW license, the team made its debut in 2022 AFL Women's season 7. It was the most supported in the AFLW in 2022 (S7) with 7,757 members. Despite finishing last in its debut season, the women's team had the 4th highest average home attendance in the league, with 3,773 playing out of the North Sydney Oval and Henson Park.

=== Current squad ===
Sydney Swans · AFL Women's personnel
Playing list		Inactive list	Coaching staff
1 Imogen Brown; 2 Holly Cooper; 3 Taylor Smith; 4 Darcy Moloney; 5 Chloe Molloy; 6 Molly Thomas; 7 Ally Morphett; 9 Lucy McEvoy (c); 10 Cynthia Hamilton (vc); 11 Jasmine Grierson; 12 Lulu Pullar; 13 Caitlin Reid; 15 Paris McCarthy; 16 Sarah Grunden; 17 Ashleigh Van Loon	18 Montana Ham; 19 Maddie Quinn; 20 Brenna Tarrant; 21 Amelia Martin; 22 Sarah Steele-Park; 23 Zippy Fish; 24 Julie O'Sullivan; 25 Sofia Hurley (vc); 26 Lara Hausegger; 27 Mary-Kate Lynch*; 28 Emma Juneja; 29 Tanya Kennedy; 30 Lexi Hamilton; 31 Laura Gardiner; 32 Indiana Williams	8 Alice Mitchell; 14 Alex Neyland	Senior coach: Colin O'Riordan; Assistant coaches: Tanya Hetherington (senior assistant/back line); Lachie Hunter (midfield); Brooke Lochland (forward line); Willem Smit (development); Legend: (c) captain; (vc) vice-captain; * rookie; Updated: 22 November 2026; Sources: Players, coaches

=== Club Champion ===
Season	Winner	Runner-up	Third place	Ref.
2022 (S7)	Cynthia Hamilton	Montana Ham	Sofia Hurley	
2023	Laura Gardiner	Chloe Molloy	Ally Morphett	
2024	Sofia Hurley	Lucy McEvoy	Laura Gardiner	
2025	Laura Gardiner	Tanya Kennedy	Montana Ham	

== Reserves team ==
The Sydney reserves are the reserves side of the club, playing in the Victorian Football League since 2021.

=== History ===
South Melbourne Juniors was formed by the South Melbourne Football Club on 29 March 1900, joining the Metropolitan Junior Football Association (MJFA).

In 1919, the Victorian Junior Football League (VFL) was formed, with the Leopold Football Club operating as South Melbourne's affiliate. At the end of the 1924 season, Leopold was replaced by the South Melbourne Second Eighteen.

The side competed in the VFL seconds (which later became the AFL reserves) until the competition's demise at the end of 1999, even after the move Sydney in 1982. The team enjoyed little success in the reserves competition, with its best performances in losing grand finals in 1927, 1956, 1980 and 1995.

In 2000, the Sydney reserves – known as the Redbacks – joined the Sydney AFL competition, but was so dominant in the lower competition that it withdrew prior to the finals series because the club felt the difference in standard was too greatly in favour of the Swans. Between 2001 and 2002, the Swans affiliated themselves with the Port Melbourne Football Club in the VFL, sending most of its reserves players there, while also retaining the Redbacks in the Sydney AFL as a junior development team. From 2003, the Sydney reserves recombined to a single team, which contested the higher standard AFL Canberra, winning four consecutive premierships between 2005 and 2008.

In 2011 the Swans reserves team joined the newly established North East Australian Football League with the rest of the AFL Canberra competition. The side often played as a curtain raiser to senior AFL games. The side never won a premiership, eliminated in the Eastern Conference Grand Finals in 2011 and 2012; then losing the overall NEAFL grand final five times: 2013, 2014, 2016, 2017 and 2018.

Following the disbandment of the NEAFL in 2020, the Sydney reserves have competed in the Victorian Football League.

== Sydney Swans Academy ==
The Sydney Swans Academy consists of the club's junior development signings. It was formed in 2010 as one of two in Sydney including the GWS Giants Academy and one of four Northern Academies including the Brisbane Lions Academy and Gold Coast Suns Academy.

72 spread staff across 9 facilities manage 550 selected underage players from age 10 up with regional hubs in Illawarra, Central Coast, Newcastle, Port Macquarie and Northern Rivers.

The men's and women's U16 and U18 teams have contested Division 2 of the men's and women's underage championships since 2017.

The Swans Academy also joined the Talent League in 2019.

== Corporate ==
=== Governance ===
The AFL Commission owns the majority stake in the club and elects seven of the nine members of its board with the two remaining being elected by the club members.

=== Administration ===
Directors:

- Andrew Pridham chairman (2013–present)
- Andrew Ireland
- Sam Mostyn
- Robert Morgan
- Greg Paramor
- Darren Steinberg
- Leo Barry
- Alexandra Goodfellow
- Brian Tyson

CEOs:

- Matthew Pavlich (2025–current)
- Andrew Ireland (2009–2018)
- Myles Baron-Hay (2004–2009)
- Phil Mullen
- Colin Seery
- Kelvin Templeton
- Jordan Sembel

=== Sponsors ===
==== Current major sponsors ====
As of November 2023, the club's sponsors are:

- realestate.com.au
- Volkswagen

==== Premier partners ====
- Nike
- Qatar Airways
- HSBC
- Carsales
- Origin Energy
- Channel 7
- Independent Reserve
- Transport for NSW
- Fiserv
- McDonalds
- Office of Responsible Gambling
- Sydney Children's Hospitals Foundation

=== Supported charities ===
- Wally Jackson Research Fund
- Sydney Australian Football Foundation (SAFF)

== Supporter base ==
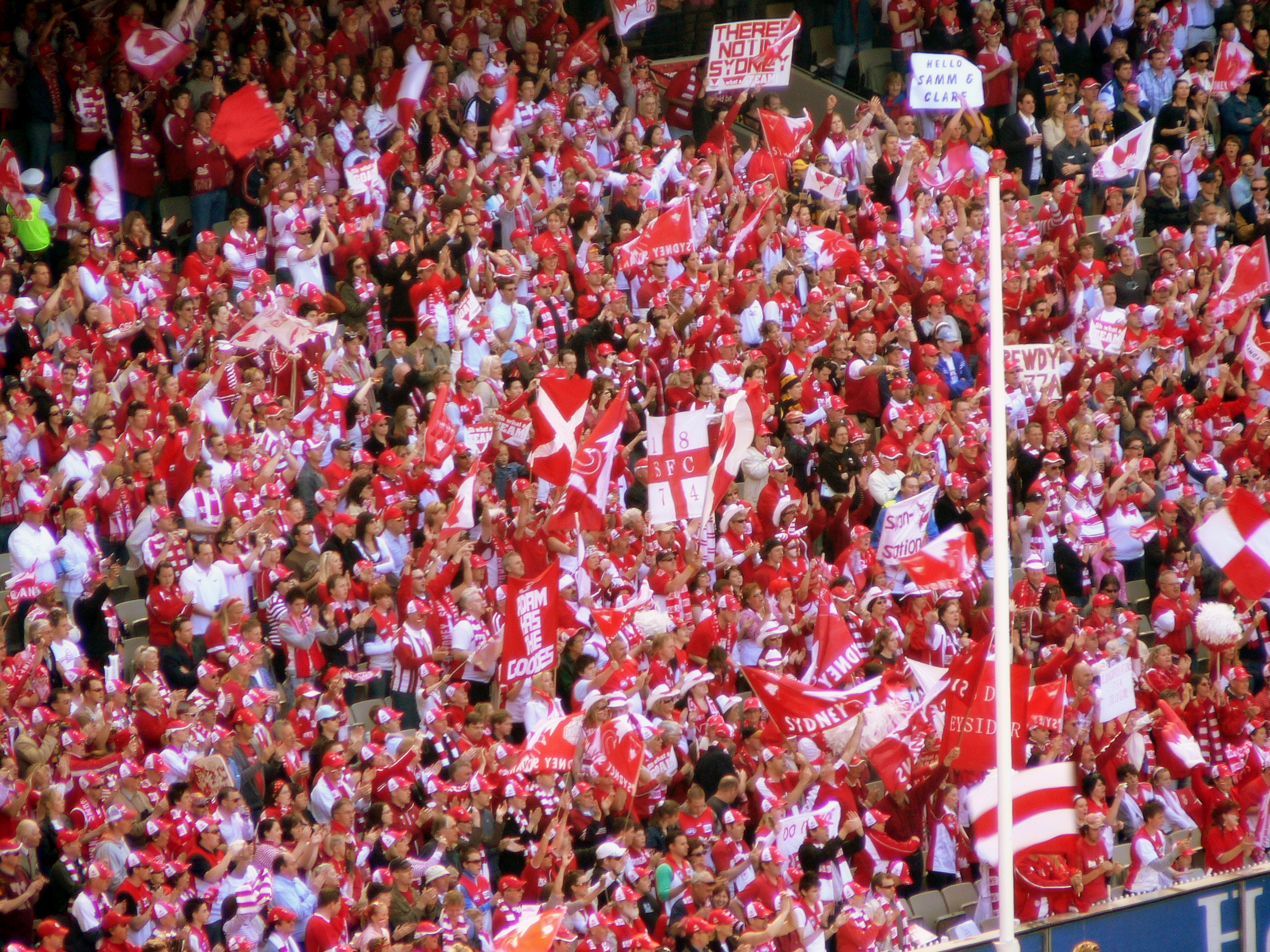
Sydney Swans supporters

Although a large majority of the existing fan base strongly objected to the relocation of the club from South Melbourne, the Sydney Swans have built a large following in the city they now call home. Attendances and memberships in Sydney grew dramatically during the Lockett era, helped out by the Super League War plaguing Rugby League. Nevertheless, the Swans continue to have a substantial supporter base in Victoria, with attendances for Swans games in Melbourne being much higher than other non-Victorian teams. In 2024, the Sydney Swans achieved their highest home attendances in club history, with an average of 38,202 fans at each of their 11 home games at the SCG, far surpassing the previous record of 35,818 that was set back in 1997. The club also reached a new membership record of 73,757 as of September 2024, 12.9% more than their previous record of 65,332, set one year earlier in 2023.

Aboriginal actress and dancer Lillian Crombie founded the First Nations supporters club, the Black Swans.

According to Roy Morgan Research, the club has been the most supported club among all AFL supporters in every year since 2004.

The club also has an official Sydney LGBTQIA+ supporter group, Rainbow Swans.

Legend: Premiers Grand Finalist Finals Wooden spoon

Year	Members	Finishing position	Average Home crowd
1982		7th	15,993
1983		11th	12,025
1984	2,750	10th	12,497
1985	2,777	10th	10,137
1986	4,927	4th	25,819
1987	3,594	4th	22,032
1988	2,516	7th	12,311
1989	2,631	7th	12,317
1990	2,624	13th	9,178
1991	2,907	12th	11,521
1992	3,020	15th	9,881
1993	3,097	15th	9,423
1994	3,327	15th	9,813
1995	6,088	12th	15,949
1996	9,525	2nd	24,996
1997	22,109	7th	36,612
1998	31,089	5th	31,549
1999	31,175	8th	30,586
2000	30,177	10th	25,308
2001	28,022	7th	27,556
2002	27,755	11th	25,270
2003	21,270	3rd	32,244
2004	25,010	5th	30,964
2005	24,955	1st	31,516
2006	30,382	2nd	32,877¹
2007	28,764	7th	35,632¹
2008	26,721	6th	32,834
2009	26,269	12th	30,506
2010	28,671	5th	31,586
2011	27,106	6th	26,615
2012	29,873	1st	27,663
2013	36,358	4th	29,104
2014	40,126	2nd	32,579
2015	48,836	5th	32,217
2016	56,523	2nd	33,425
2017	58,838	5th	34,475
2018	60,934	7th	32,575
2019	61,912	15th	31,070
2020	48,322	16th	3,421
2021	50,144	6th	21,209
2022	55,394	2nd	29,424
2023	65,332	8th	32,824
2024	75,277	2nd	38,202
2025	76,674	10th	34,277

== Club honour boards ==
=== Honour board ===
Year	Posn	Coach	Captain	Best & Fairest	Leading goalkicker (goals)
1897	5	Bill Fraser	Bill Fraser		Dinny McKay (14)
1898	5	Bill Fraser	Bill Fraser		Charlie Colgan (13)
1899	6	Dave Adamson	Dave Adamson		Charlie Colgan (27)
1900	5	George Davidson, Bill Windley	George Davidson, Bill Windley		Harry Lampe (16)
1901	6	Albert Trim	Albert Trim		Harry Lampe (20)
1902	5	Bill Windley	Bill Windley		Charlie Goding (19)
1903	8	Tom Fogarty	Tom Fogarty		Charlie Goding (10)
1904	5	Bill McGee	Bill McGee		Charles Clements (37)
1905	5	Bill McGee, Tom Fogarty	Bill McGee, Tom Fogarty		Charles Clements (31)
1906	5	Herb Howson	Herb Howson		Len Mortimer (24)
1907	2	Bill Dolphin	Bill Dolphin		Len Mortimer (37)
1908	5	Bill Dolphin	Bill Dolphin		Len Mortimer (40)
1909	1	Charlie Ricketts	Charlie Ricketts		Len Mortimer (50)
1910	3	Charlie Ricketts	Charlie Ricketts		Len Mortimer (28)
1911	4	Bill Thomas	Bill Thomas		Len Mortimer (44)
1912	2	Charlie Ricketts	Charlie Ricketts		Len Mortimer (40)
1913	3	Harvey Kelly	Vic Belcher		Bill Strang (29)
1914	2	Vic Belcher	Vic Belcher		Jack Freeman (36)
1915	5	Vic Belcher	Vic Belcher		Harry Morgan (35)
1916	–	Did not compete due to World War I			
1917	4	Vic Belcher	Vic Belcher		Harry Morgan (23)
1918	1	Bert Howson, Sonny Elms	Charlie Pannam		Gerald P. Ryan (32)
1919	3	Bert Howson, Sonny Elms	Jim Caldwell		Harold Robertson (38)
1920	5	Arthur Hiskins	Vic Belcher		Stan Wootton (28)
1921	7	Artie Wood	Carl Willis		Roy Cazaly (19)
1922	9	Roy Cazaly	Roy Cazaly, Mark Tandy		Roy Cazaly (28)
1923	3	Charlie Pannam	Paddy Scanlan		Ted Johnson (40)
1924	6	Charlie Pannam	Paddy Scanlan		Ted Johnson (60)
1925	8	Charlie Pannam	Paddy Scanlan		Ted Johnson (60)
1926	5	Charlie Pannam	Charlie Pannam	Roy Cazaly	Ted Johnson (45)
1927	6	Charlie Pannam	Charlie Pannam	Hec McKay	Ted Johnson (50)
1928	10	Charlie Pannam	Charlie Pannam, Joe Scanlan	Len Thomas	Ted Johnson (60)
1929	8	Jim Caldwell, Fred Fleiter	Charlie Stanbridge	Danny Wheelahan	Austin Robertson Sr. (53)
1930	7	Paddy Scanlan	Joe Scanlan	Ron Hillis	Austin Robertson Sr. (54)
1931	7	Paddy Scanlan	Joe Scanlan	Len Thomas	Austin Robertson Sr. (38)
1932	4	Johnny Leonard	Johnny Leonard	Bill Faul	Bob Pratt (71)
1933	1	Jack Bissett	Jack Bissett	Harry Clarke	Bob Pratt (109)
1934	2	Jack Bissett	Jack Bissett	Terry Brain	Bob Pratt (150)
1935	2	Jack Bissett	Jack Bissett	Ron Hillis	Bob Pratt (103)
1936	2	Jack Bissett	Jack Bissett	Herbie Matthews	Bob Pratt (64)
1937	9	Roy Cazaly	Laurie Nash	Herbie Matthews	Laurie Nash (37)
1938	12	Roy Cazaly	Herbie Matthews	Len Thomas	Roy Moore (34)
1939	12	Herbie Matthews	Herbie Matthews	Herbie Matthews	Bob Pratt (72)
1940	10	Herbie Matthews	Herbie Matthews	Herbie Matthews	Lou Reiffel (33)
1941	8	Joe Kelly	Herbie Matthews	Reg Ritchie	Jack Graham (33)
1942	3	Joe Kelly	Herbie Matthews	Jim Cleary	Lindsay White (80)
1943	8	Joe Kelly	Herbie Matthews	Herbie Matthews	Charlie Culph (35)
1944	7	Joe Kelly	Herbie Matthews	Jim Cleary	Ron Hartridge (31)
1945	2	William Adams	Herbie Matthews	Jack Graham	Laurie Nash (56)
1946	7	William Adams	Jack Graham	Bill Williams	Harry Mears (32)
1947	8	William Adams	Jack Graham	Bill Williams	Bill Williams (38)
1948	10	William Adams, Jack Hale	Jack Graham	Ron Clegg	Jack Graham (32)
1949	10	Jack Hale	Bert Lucas	Ron Clegg	Dick Jones (27)
1950	11	Gordon Lane	Gordon Lane	Bill Williams	Gordon Lane (47)
1951	8	Gordon Lane	Gordon Lane	Ron Clegg	Bill Williams (41)
1952	5	Gordon Lane	Gordon Lane	Keith Schaefer	Gordon Lane (33)
1953	8	Laurie Nash	Ron Clegg	Jim Taylor	Ian Gillett (34)
1954	10	Herbie Matthews	Ron Clegg	Eddie Lane	Eddie Lane (28)
1955	10	Herbie Matthews	Bill Gunn	Ian Gillett	Eddie Lane (36)
1956	9	Herbie Matthews	Ian Gillett	Jim Dorgan	Bill Gunn (28)
1957	10	Herbie Matthews	Ron Clegg	Jim Taylor	Fred Goldsmith (43)
1958	9	Ron Clegg	Ron Clegg	Bob Skilton	Max Oaten (34)
1959	9	Ron Clegg	Ron Clegg	Bob Skilton	Bob Skilton (60)
1960	8	Bill Faul	Ron Clegg	Frank Johnson	Max Oaten (39)
1961	11	Bill Faul	Bob Skilton	Bob Skilton	Brian McGowan (38)
1962	12	Noel McMahen	Bob Skilton	Bob Skilton	Bob Skilton (36)
1963	11	Noel McMahen	Bob Skilton	Bob Skilton	Bob Skilton (36)
1964	11	Noel McMahen	Bob Skilton	Bob Skilton	Max Papley (25)
1965	8	Bob Skilton	Bob Skilton	Bob Skilton	Bob Kingston (48)
1966	8	Bob Skilton	Bob Skilton	Max Papley	Austin Robertson Jr. (60)
1967	9	Alan Miller	Bob Skilton	Bob Skilton	John Sudholz (35)
1968	9	Alan Miller	Bob Skilton	Bob Skilton	John Sudholz (36)
1969	9	Norm Smith	Bob Skilton	Peter Bedford	John Sudholz (35)
1970	4	Norm Smith	Bob Skilton	Peter Bedford	John Sudholz (62)
1971	12	Norm Smith	Bob Skilton	Peter Bedford	Peter Bedford (44)
1972	11	Norm Smith	John Rantall	Russell Cook	Peter Bedford (28)
1973	12	Graeme John	Peter Bedford	Peter Bedford	Peter Bedford (52)
1974	9	Graeme John	Peter Bedford	Norm Goss Jr.	Norm Goss Jr. (37)
1975	12	Graeme John	Peter Bedford	Peter Bedford	Graham Teasdale (38)
1976	8	Ian Stewart	Peter Bedford	Rick Quade	Robert Dean (37)
1977	5	Ian Stewart	Rick Quade	Graham Teasdale	Graham Teasdale (38)
1978	8	Des Tuddenham	Rick Quade	John Murphy	John Murphy (31)
1979	10	Ian Stewart	Rick Quade	Barry Round	Tony Morwood (56)
1980	6	Ian Stewart	Barry Round	David Ackerly	John Roberts (67)
1981	9	Ian Stewart	Barry Round	Barry Round	John Roberts (51)
1982	7	Rick Quade	Barry Round	David Ackerly	Tony Morwood (45)
1983	11	Rick Quade	Barry Round	Mark Browning	Craig Braddy (48)
1984	10	Rick Quade, Bob Hammond	Barry Round, Mark Browning	Bernie Evans	Warwick Capper (39)
1985	10	John Northey	Mark Browning	Stephen Wright	Warwick Capper (45)
1986	4	Tom Hafey	Dennis Carroll	Gerard Healy	Warwick Capper (92)
1987	4	Tom Hafey	Dennis Carroll	Gerard Healy	Warwick Capper (103)
1988	7	Tom Hafey	Dennis Carroll	Gerard Healy	Barry Mitchell (35)
1989	7	Col Kinnear	Dennis Carroll	Mark Bayes	Bernard Toohey (27)
1990	13	Col Kinnear	Dennis Carroll	Stephen Wright	Jim West (34)
1991	12	Col Kinnear	Dennis Carroll	Barry Mitchell	Jason Love (52)
1992	15	Gary Buckenara	Dennis Carroll	Paul Kelly	Simon Minton-Connell (60)
1993	15	Gary Buckenara, Brett Scott, Ron Barassi	Paul Kelly	Paul Kelly	Simon Minton-Connell (41)
1994	15	Ron Barassi	Paul Kelly	Daryn Cresswell	Simon Minton-Connell (68)
1995	12	Ron Barassi	Paul Kelly	Tony Lockett	Tony Lockett (110)
1996	2	Rodney Eade	Paul Kelly	Paul Kelly	Tony Lockett (121)
1997	7	Rodney Eade	Paul Kelly	Paul Kelly	Tony Lockett (37)
1998	5	Rodney Eade	Paul Kelly	Michael O'Loughlin	Tony Lockett (109)
1999	8	Rodney Eade	Paul Kelly	Wayne Schwass	Tony Lockett (82)
2000	10	Rodney Eade	Paul Kelly	Andrew Schauble	Michael O'Loughlin (53)
2001	7	Rodney Eade	Paul Kelly	Paul Williams	Michael O'Loughlin (35)
2002	11	Rodney Eade, Paul Roos	Paul Kelly	Paul Williams	Barry Hall (55)
2003	4	Paul Roos	Stuart Maxfield	Adam Goodes	Barry Hall (64)
2004	5	Paul Roos	Stuart Maxfield	Barry Hall	Barry Hall (74)
2005	1	Paul Roos	Stuart Maxfield (Note: Six rounds into the 2005 season, Stuart Maxfield ended his playing career due to chronic injury. Six players rotated as captain throughout the rest of the season: Brett Kirk, Leo Barry, Barry Hall, Ben Mathews, Adam Goodes and Jude Bolton.)	Brett Kirk	Barry Hall (80)
2006	2	Paul Roos	Barry Hall, Brett Kirk and Leo Barry	Adam Goodes	Barry Hall (78)
2007	7	Paul Roos	Barry Hall, Brett Kirk and Leo Barry	Brett Kirk	Barry Hall (44)
2008	6	Paul Roos	Brett Kirk, Leo Barry and Craig Bolton	Jarrad McVeigh	Barry Hall (41)
2009	12	Paul Roos	Brett Kirk, Adam Goodes and Craig Bolton	Ryan O'Keefe	Adam Goodes (38)
2010	5	Paul Roos	Brett Kirk, Adam Goodes and Craig Bolton	Kieren Jack	Adam Goodes (44)
2011	6	John Longmire	Adam Goodes and Jarrad McVeigh	Adam Goodes	Adam Goodes (41)
2012	1	John Longmire	Adam Goodes and Jarrad McVeigh	Josh Kennedy	Lewis Jetta (45)
2013	4	John Longmire	Kieren Jack and Jarrad McVeigh	Jarrad McVeigh	Kurt Tippett (35)
2014	2	John Longmire	Kieren Jack and Jarrad McVeigh	Luke Parker	Lance Franklin (79)
2015	5	John Longmire	Kieren Jack and Jarrad McVeigh	Josh Kennedy	Lance Franklin (47)
2016	2	John Longmire	Kieren Jack and Jarrad McVeigh	Josh Kennedy	Lance Franklin (81)
2017	5	John Longmire	Josh Kennedy	Luke Parker	Lance Franklin (73)
2018	6	John Longmire	Josh Kennedy	Jake Lloyd	Lance Franklin (57)
2019	15	John Longmire	Josh Kennedy, Dane Rampe and Luke Parker	Dane Rampe	Tom Papley (37)
2020	16	John Longmire	Josh Kennedy, Dane Rampe and Luke Parker	Jake Lloyd	Tom Papley (26)
2021	7	John Longmire	Josh Kennedy, Dane Rampe and Luke Parker	Luke Parker	Lance Franklin (51)
2022	2	John Longmire	Callum Mills, Dane Rampe and Luke Parker	Callum Mills	Lance Franklin (52)
2023	8	John Longmire	Callum Mills, Dane Rampe and Luke Parker	Errol Gulden	Tom Papley (37)
2024	2	John Longmire	Callum Mills	Isaac Heeney	Joel Amartey (43)
2025	10	Dean Cox	Callum Mills	Isaac Heeney	Isaac Heeney (37)

=== Team of the century ===
Sydney announced its team of the century on 8 August 2003:

=== Hall of fame ===
Sydney Swans
**Hall of Fame**
**Individuals**

**Peter Bedford**
David Ackerly
Jack Bisset
Mark Browning
Rod Carter
**Jared Crouch**
**Paul Kelly**
William Faul
**Barry Hall**
Herb Howson
Barry Mitchell
Bill Windley
**Bob Skilton**
Ron Hillis
Tadhg Kennelly

Craig Kimberley
Denis McKay
Tony Morwood
**Michael O'Loughlin**
Charlie Ricketts
Bruce Sloss
Len Thomas
**Greg Williams**
Jimmy Young
**Peter Burns**
**Paul Roos**
Bernard Toohey
Dennis Carroll
Stuart Maxfield
Len Mortimer

Leo Barry
Craig Bolton
Jim Caldwell
**Roy Cazaly**
Andrew Dunkley
Fred Goldsmith
**Gerard Healy**
**Herbie Matthews**
Graeme John
Brett Kirk
**Laurie Nash**
Adam Goodes
Harry Clarke
Ryan O'Keefe
Ted Richards

David McLeish
David Murphy
Rick Quade
Lewis Roberts-Thomson
**Mark Tandy**
William Thomas
Paul Williams
Stephen Wright
Graham Teasdale
Edward Johnson
**John Rantall**
Terry Brain
Bernie Evans
**Barry Round**

Mark Bayes
**Ron Clegg**
Jude Bolton
**Bob Pratt**
Warwick Capper
Jim Cleary
Henry Elms
Jack Graham
John Heriot
**Tony Lockett**
Jim Taylor
**Vic Belcher**
Bill Gunn
Billy Williams

Players listed in **bold** are inductees in the Australian Football Hall of Fame.
Players listed in **bold and italics** are legends in the Australian Football Hall of Fame.

== Achievements ==
=== Club achievements ===
Premierships
Competition	Level	Wins	Years won
Australian Football League	Seniors	5	1909, 1918, 1933, 2005, 2012
Victorian Football Association (1879–1896)	Seniors	5	1881, 1885, 1888, 1889, 1890
AFL Canberra (2003–2010)	Reserves	4	2005, 2006, 2007, 2008
AFL Under-19s	Under 19s	1	1956
Other titles and honours
VFL Night Series	Seniors	3	1956, 1957, 1960
AFC Night Series	Seniors	1	1982
McClelland Trophy	Multiple (Note: Between 1951 and 1990 the McClelland Trophy was awarded to the club with the highest-aggregate points across the VFL/AFL seniors premiership, VFL/AFL reserves premiership, and VFL/AFL under 19s premiership. Between 1991 and 2022 it was awarded to the club who finished on top of the AFL premiership ladder, thereby merging it with the minor premiership. Since 2023 it has been awarded to the club with the highest aggregate-points across the AFL and AFL Women's competitions.)	4	1996, 2014, 2016, 2026
Finishing positions
Australian Football League	Minor premiership	10	1909, 1912, 1918, 1935, 1936, 1945, 1996, 2014, 2016, 2024
Australian Football League	Grand Finalist	14	1899, 1907, 1912, 1914, 1934, 1935, 1936, 1945, 1996, 2006, 2014, 2016, 2022, 2024
Australian Football League	Wooden spoons	11	1903, 1922, 1938, 1939, 1962, 1971, 1973, 1975, 1992, 1993, 1994
AFL Women's	Minor premiership	0	
AFL Women's	Grand Finalist	0	
AFL Women's	Wooden spoons	1	2022 (S7)

=== Individual achievements ===
Bob Skilton Medal (Club best and fairest)

Brownlow Medal (League best and fairest)

- Herbie Matthews – 1940
- Ron Clegg – 1949
- Fred Goldsmith – 1955
- Bob Skilton – 1959, 1963, 1968
- Peter Bedford – 1970
- Graham Teasdale – 1977
- Barry Round – 1981
- Greg Williams – 1986
- Gerard Healy – 1988
- Paul Kelly – 1995
- Adam Goodes – 2003, 2006

Norm Smith Medal (AFL Grand Final best on ground)

- Ryan O'Keefe – 2012

Leigh Matthews Trophy (AFLPA Most Valuable Player)

- Gerard Healy – 1988

Coleman Medal (Leading Goal Kicker)

- Tony Lockett – 1996, 1998
- Lance Franklin – 2014, 2017
- Charlie Curnow - 2026

AFL Rising Star (Best player under 21)

- Adam Goodes – 1999
- Dan Hannebery – 2010
- Callum Mills – 2016

== Records ==
- Most games – Adam Goodes (372)
- Most goals – Bob Pratt (681)
- Most goals in match – Tony Lockett (16), Round 19, 1995 v Fitzroy at Western Oval
- Most goals in a season – Bob Pratt (150) in 1934
- Most games coached – John Longmire (300)
- Highest score – 36.20 (236) vs Essendon 11.7 (73), Round 17, 1987
- Lowest score – South Melbourne 0.5 (5) vs Carlton 3.6 (24), Round 8, 1899
- Lowest score since 1919 – South Melbourne 1.9 (15) vs Geelong 8.9 (57), Round 16, 1964
- Highest losing score – South Melbourne 24.10 (154) vs Melbourne 24.23 (167), Round 1, 1979
- Lowest winning score – South Melbourne 2.3 (15) vs Melbourne 1.7 (13), Round 6, 1898
- Lowest winning score since 1919 – South Melbourne 4.15 (39) vs Fitzroy 4.12 (36), Round 4, 1919
  - Since 1920 – South Melbourne 5.11 (41) vs St. Kilda 5.9 (39), Round 16, 1948
- Greatest Winning Margin
  - As South Melbourne – (171 points) – South Melbourne 29.15 (189) vs St. Kilda 2.6 (18), Round 12, 1919
  - As Sydney Swans – (171 points) – Sydney Swans 31.19 (205) vs West Coast Eagles 5.4 (34), Round 15, 2023
- Greatest Losing Margin – (165 points) – South Melbourne 2.7 (19) vs Essendon 28.16 (184), Round 18, 1964

== Activism ==
=== Same-sex marriage ===
During the Australian Marriage Law Postal Survey, Sydney Swans supported the Yes vote.

=== Voice to Parliament ===
Sydney Swans was a supporter of the Voice to Parliament.

== See also ==
- Australian rules football in New South Wales
- Sport in Australia
- Sport in New South Wales
