= 1889 VFA season =

13th season of the Victorian Football Association

Overview
- Date: 4 May – 28 September 1889
- Teams: 12
- Premiers: South Melbourne; 4th premiership

The 1889 VFA season was the 13th season of the Victorian Football Association (VFA), the highest-level senior Australian rules football competition in Victoria.

South Melbourne won the premiership for the fourth time, making it the club's second out of a sequence of three consecutive premierships won from 1888 to 1890.

== Association membership ==
The number of teams contesting the Association premiership reduced from 16 senior teams to 12 in 1889.

The three Ballarat-based clubs – Ballarat, South Ballarat and Ballarat Imperial remained senior clubs, represented on the Association Board of Management and contested the Ballarat premiership, but matches played against them by metropolitan clubs (which often occurred during bye weeks) no longer qualified for the premiership. University, after a winless 1888 season, dropped out of the Association and went into recess.

== Ladder ==
Teams did not play a uniform number of premiership matches during the season. As such, in the final standings, each team's premiership points were adjusted upwards proportionally to represent a 21-match season – e.g., South Melbourne played 19 matches, so its tally of premiership points was increased by a factor of 21/19. After this adjustment, there was no formal process for breaking a tie.

Pos	Team	Pld	W	L	D	GF	GA	Pts	Adj Pts
1	South Melbourne (P)	19	14	2	3	122	49	62	68.53
2	Carlton	20	15	5	0	100	64	60	63.00
3	Port Melbourne	20	13	4	3	93	55	58	60.90
4	Essendon	21	13	8	0	112	55	52	52.00
5	Geelong	20	10	6	4	88	73	48	50.40
6	North Melbourne	20	11	8	1	94	75	46	48.30
7	Fitzroy	20	10	8	2	86	66	44	46.20
8	Richmond	19	7	11	1	62	102	30	33.16
9	St Kilda	19	6	12	1	61	114	26	30.33
10	Williamstown	20	5	13	2	55	73	24	25.20
11	Melbourne	21	4	16	1	46	142	18	18.00
12	Footscray	16	1	15	0	37	88	4	5.25

(P) Premiers

== Notable events ==
- Amendments to the rules prior to the season included:
  - Changes the rules related to the end of a quarter, allowing a ball in transit at the sound of the bell to score, and allowing a player who had marked prior to the bell to take a set shot after the bell which would still count. Prior to this, the ball was declared dead for no score as soon as the bell sounded in either instance.
  - A new requirement that a team kicking off from the centre (to start a quarter or after a goal) kick a distance of at least twenty yards, preventing them from dribble-kicking and immediately recovering the ball.
- Footscray defeated Melbourne 5–2 in its sixth premiership fixture for the season, but the win was awarded to Melbourne on protest because Footscray fielded a player without the proper clearance.
