= Len Mortimer =

Australian rules footballer and coach

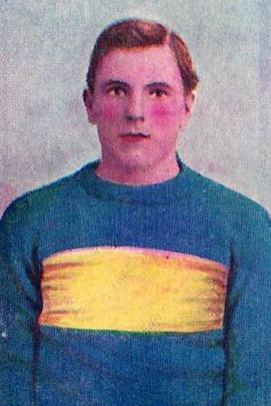
- Cigarette card of Mortimer in 1905

Personal information
- Full name: Edward Lennox Mortimer
- Born: 24 April 1886; Footscray, Victoria
- Died: 2 November 1962 (aged 76); Footscray, Victoria
- Original team: Williamstown (VFA)
- Height: 178 cm (5 ft 10 in)
- Weight: 74 kg (163 lb)

Playing career^{1}
| Years | Club | Games (Goals) |
| 1904–1905 | Williamstown (VFA) | 31 (67) |
| 1906–1915 | South Melbourne | 153 (289) |
- ^{1} Playing statistics correct to the end of 1915.

Career highlights
- 1909 South Melbourne premiership

Edward Lennox Mortimer (24 April 1886 – 2 November 1962) was an Australian rules footballer who played with South Melbourne in the VFL.

He was recruited from Williamstown, where he played 31 games and kicked 67 goals in 1904 and 1905. A full forward, he was the leading goalkicker in the 1905 Victorian Football Association, with a total of 48, and became the first Williamstown player to ever head the Association goalkicking list. In his first seven seasons in the VFL he topped South Melbourne's goalkicking charts and was a member of the club's inaugural premiership side in 1909.

In 1916, he was appointed as coach of Yarraville, which competed in the Victorian Junior Football Association at the time.
