= 2012 AFL finals series =

2012 premiership season
- Date: 7–29 September 2012
- Teams: 8
- Premiers: Sydney (5th premiership)
- Runners-up: Hawthorn (16th grand final)
- Minor premiers: Hawthorn (8th minor premiership)

Attendance
- Matches played: 9
- Total attendance: 539,948 (59,994 per match)
- Highest: 99,683 (Grand Final, Hawthorn vs. Sydney)

The 2012 Australian Football League finals series determined the winner of the 2012 AFL season. The series took place over four weekends in September 2012, culminating with the 116th AFL/VFL Grand Final at the Melbourne Cricket Ground on 29 September 2012.

== The finals system ==
The system is a final eight system. This system is currently used by the National Rugby League, and is different from the McIntyre final eight system, which was previously used by both the AFL and the NRL.

The top four teams in the eight receive what is popularly known as the "double chance" when they play in week-one qualifying finals. This means that even if a top-four team loses in the first week, it still remains in the finals, playing a semi-final the next week against the winner of an elimination final. The bottom four of the eight play knock-out games, in that only the winners survive and move on to the next week. Home-state advantage goes to the team with the higher seed in the first two weeks, to the qualifying final winners in the third week. Games in Victoria are played at the MCG, regardless of the team's usual home ground, if a crowd larger than the seating capacity of Etihad Stadium (53,359) is expected.

In the second week, the winners of the qualifying finals receive a bye to the third week. The losers of the qualifying final plays the elimination finals winners in a semi-final. In the third week, the winners of the semi-finals from week two play the winners of the qualifying finals in the first week. The winners of those matches move on to the Grand Final at the MCG in Melbourne.

== Qualification ==
2012 AFL ladder
Pos	Team	Pld	W	L	D	PF	PA	PP	Pts	
1	Hawthorn	22	17	5	0	2679	1733	154.6	68	Finals series
2	Adelaide	22	17	5	0	2428	1833	132.5	68	Finals series
3	Sydney (P)	22	16	6	0	2290	1629	140.6	64	Finals series
4	Collingwood	22	16	6	0	2123	1823	116.5	64	Finals series
5	West Coast	22	15	7	0	2244	1807	124.2	60	Finals series
6	Geelong	22	15	7	0	2209	1886	117.1	60	Finals series
7	Fremantle	22	14	8	0	1956	1691	115.7	56	Finals series
8	North Melbourne	22	14	8	0	2359	2097	112.5	56	Finals series
9	St Kilda	22	12	10	0	2347	1903	123.3	48	
10	Carlton	22	11	11	0	2079	1925	108.0	44	
11	Essendon	22	11	11	0	2091	2090	100.0	44	
12	Richmond	22	10	11	1	2169	1943	111.6	42	
13	Brisbane Lions	22	10	12	0	1904	2092	91.0	40	
14	Port Adelaide	22	5	16	1	1691	2144	78.9	22	
15	Western Bulldogs	22	5	17	0	1542	2301	67.0	20	
16	Melbourne	22	4	18	0	1580	2341	67.5	16	
17	Gold Coast	22	3	19	0	1509	2481	60.8	12	
18	Greater Western Sydney	22	2	20	0	1270	2751	46.2	8	

Rules for classification: 1) points; 2) percentage; 3) number of points for.
(P) Premiers

== Summary of results ==
Qualifying and elimination finals
7 September, MCG
1	Hawthorn	20.15 (135)
4	Collingwood	15.7 (97)
9 September, Patersons Stadium
5	West Coast	24.18 (162)
8	North Melbourne	9.12 (66)
8 September, MCG
6	Geelong	11.14 (80)
7	Fremantle	14.12 (96)
8 September, AAMI Stadium
2	Adelaide	5.12 (42)
3	Sydney	11.5 (71)

Semi-finals
15 September, MCG
Collingwood	10.13 (73)
West Coast	9.6 (60)
14 September, AAMI Stadium
Adelaide	12.9 (81)
Fremantle	11.5 (71)

Preliminary finals
22 September, MCG
Hawthorn	13.19 (97)
Adelaide	14.8 (92)
21 September, ANZ Stadium
Sydney	13.18 (96)
Collingwood	10.10 (70)

Grand final
29 September, MCG
Hawthorn	11.15 (81)
Sydney	14.7 (91)

== Week one (qualifying & elimination finals) ==
=== First qualifying final (Hawthorn vs. Collingwood) ===
First qualifying final
Friday, 7 September (7:50 pm)	Hawthorn	def.	Collingwood	MCG (crowd: 84,625)	Report
4.6 (30); 9.10 (64); 15.13 (103); 20.15 (135)	Q1; Q2; Q3; Final	2.3 (15); 7.4 (46); 12.7 (79); 15.7 (97)	Television broadcast: Seven Network, Fox Footy (simulcast)
4: Franklin; 2: Breust, Gunston, Hale, Hodge, Rioli, Savage; 1: Ellis, Puopolo, Roughead, Smith	Goals	6: Cloke; 4: Krakouer; 2: Wellingham; 1: Dawes, Shaw, Sinclair
Mitchell, Sewell, Franklin	Best	Cloke, Pendlebury, Beams
Whitecross (knee)	Injuries

=== Second qualifying final (Adelaide vs. Sydney) ===
Second qualifying final
Saturday, 8 September (2:45 pm)	Adelaide	def. by	Sydney	AAMI Stadium (crowd: 44,849)	Report
1.3 (9); 2.7 (19); 3.10 (28); 5.12 (42)	Q1; Q2; Q3; Final	2.2 (14); 7.2 (44); 8.4 (52); 11.5 (71)	Television broadcast: Seven Network, Fox Footy (simulcast)
1: Callinan, Johncock, Sloane, van Berlo, Walker	Goals	3: Goodes; 2: Jetta, Morton; 1: Kennedy, McGlynn, Parker, Reid
Thompson, Sloane, Doughty	Best	O'Keefe, Kennedy, Goodes
Talia (arm)	Injuries
Sydney improved to 2-0 in September Finals in Adelaide. In both games they never trailed.

=== Second elimination final (Geelong vs. Fremantle) ===
Second elimination final
Saturday, 8 September (7:45 pm)	Geelong	def. by	Fremantle	MCG (crowd: 44,460)	Report
0.1 (1); 3.5 (23); 6.9 (45); 11.14 (80)	Q1; Q2; Q3; Final	5.7 (37); 8.9 (57); 12.11 (83); 14.12 (96)	Television broadcast: Seven Network, Fox Footy (simulcast)
2: Mackie, J. Hunt; 1: Selwood, Duncan, Christensen, Stokes, Taylor, Vardy, Motlop	Goals	6: Pavlich; 3: Ballantyne; 2: Walters; 1: Crowley, de Boer, Pearce
Selwood, Bartel, Mackie	Best	Pavlich, Mundy. Ballantyne
Fremantle won their first finals game outside of Western Australia.

=== First elimination final (West Coast vs. North Melbourne) ===
First elimination final
Sunday, 9 September (1:15 pm)	West Coast	def.	North Melbourne	Patersons Stadium (crowd: 41,790)	Report
7.4 (46); 11.8 (74); 15.11 (101); 24.18 (162)	Q1; Q2; Q3; Final	0.3 (3); 2.8 (20); 8.10 (58); 9.12 (66)	Television broadcast: Seven Network, Fox Footy (simulcast)
4: Embley, Darling, Kennedy; 3: Lynch; 1: Kerr, Masten, Shuey, Hurn, Cox, Naitanui, Hill, McGinnity, Mackenzie	Goals	3: Campbell, Harvey; 1: Cunnington, Hansen, Petrie
Embley, Cox, Kerr	Best	Swallow, Ziebell, Harvey
Waters (foot)	Injuries
Reports	Harvey (striking)

== Week two (semi-finals) ==
=== First semi-final (Collingwood vs. West Coast) ===
First semi-final
Saturday, 15 September (7:45 pm)	Collingwood	def.	West Coast	MCG (crowd: 65,483)	Report
3.4 (22); 4.5 (29); 8.10 (58); 10.13 (73)	Q1; Q2; Q3; Final	5.1 (31); 6.4 (40); 7.6 (48); 9.6 (60)	Television broadcast: Seven Network, Fox Footy (simulcast)
3:Thomas; 2: Swan; 1: Pendlebury, Goldsack, Blair, Jolly, O'Brien	Goals	2: Hill, Darling; 1: Kerr, Cox, McGinnity, Naitanui, Kennedy
Pendlebury, Swan, Thomas	Best	Kerr, Gaff, Shuey

=== Second semi-final (Adelaide vs. Fremantle) ===
Second semi-final
Friday, 14 September (8:15 pm)	Adelaide	def.	Fremantle	AAMI Stadium (crowd: 31,742)	Report
1.3 (9); 4.7 (31); 8.9 (57); 12.9 (81)	Q1; Q2; Q3; Final	4.1 (25); 7.2 (44); 8.4 (52); 11.5 (71)	Television broadcast: Seven Network, Fox Footy (simulcast)
5: Walker; 3: Porplyzia; 1: Vince, Dangerfield, Wright, Tippett	Goals	3: Mayne, Walters; 1: Fyfe, Ibbotson, Ballantyne, Pavlich, Suban
Walker, Porplyzia, Reilly	Best	Mundy, Mayne, Johnson
Petrenko (shoulder)	Injuries

== Week three (preliminary finals) ==
=== Second preliminary final (Sydney vs. Collingwood) ===
Second preliminary final
Friday, 21 September (7:50 pm)	Sydney	def.	Collingwood	ANZ Stadium (crowd: 57,156)	Report
5.5 (35); 7.9 (51); 9.14 (68); 13.18 (96)	Q1; Q2; Q3; Final	2.3 (15); 3.6 (24); 5.8 (38); 10.10 (70)	Umpires: Matt Stevic, Simon Meredith, Brett Rosebury; Television broadcast: Seven Network, Fox Footy (simulcast)
3: Jetta; 2: Kennedy, Bolton, Roberts-Thomson; 1: O'Keefe, Goodes, Bird, Mumford	Goals	3: Cloke; 1: Beams, Swan, Johnson, Fasolo, Tarrant, Dawes, Goldsack
Kennedy, O'Keefe, Goodes	Best	Pendlebury, Beams, O'Brien
Jude Bolton (Sydney) played his 300th game.; Sydney defeated Collingwood for the first time since round 13, 2005, breaking an eleven-game losing streak.

=== First preliminary final (Hawthorn vs. Adelaide) ===
First preliminary final
Saturday, 22 September (5:15 pm)	Hawthorn	def.	Adelaide	MCG (crowd: 69,146)	Report
2.6 (18); 5.10 (40); 11.14 (80); 13.19 (97)	Q1; Q2; Q3; Final	4.1 (25); 7.3 (45); 10.4 (64); 14.8 (92)	Umpires: Chris Donlon, Mathew Nicholls, Shane McInerney; Television broadcast: Seven Network, Fox Footy (simulcast)
3: Franklin; 2: Rioli, Breust, Gunston; 1: Young, Shiels, Burgoyne, Suckling	Goals	4: Tippett, Walker; 1: Porplyzia, Sloane, van Berlo, Henderson, Smith, Johncock
Mitchell, Rioli, Sewell	Best	Porplyzia, Dangerfield, Tippett

== Week four (Grand Final) ==
Grand Final
Saturday, 29 September (2:30 pm)	Hawthorn	def. by	Sydney	MCG (crowd: 99,683)	Report
4.5 (29); 4.6 (30); 9.10 (64); 11.15 (81)	Q1; Q2; Q3; Final	1.4 (10); 7.4 (46); 10.5 (65); 14.7 (91)	Umpires: Rosebury, Stevic, Meredith; Norm Smith Medal: Ryan O'Keefe (Sydney); Television broadcast: Seven Network; National anthem: Marina Prior
Franklin 3, Breust 2, Gunston 2, Hale 2, Ellis, Smith	Goals	Jack 2, Kennedy 2, Malceski 2, McVeigh 2, Morton 2, Goodes, Hannebery, Reid, Roberts-Thomson
Franklin, Sewell, Burgoyne, Mitchell, Breust, Hale	Best	Hannebery, O'Keefe, Kennedy, McVeigh, Jetta, Goodes
Ellis (calf), Hodge (head)	Injuries	Goodes (knee), Johnson (wrist)
Nil	Reports	Nil

== Scheduling Issues ==
There were a number of scheduling issues during the 2012 AFL finals series:

- In Week 1, West Coast was forced to play on either the Friday night or Sunday due to Patersons Stadium being unavailable on the Saturday due to a rugby union international between the Wallabies and the Springboks.
- In week 2, the late match starting time between Adelaide and Fremantle of 8:15 pm ACST contributed to the lowest crowd for an Adelaide final. 31,742 fans attended the match at AAMI Stadium, almost 20,000 short of capacity. The AFL dismissed suggestions that ticket prices were to blame, but said the unusual starting time and possibly the pessimistic expectations of local supporters following their defeat to Sydney the previous week may have led to the poor turnout.
- In week 3, a potential fixturing clash between the AFL and NRL at ANZ Stadium in Sydney led to the AFL scheduling the second preliminary on the Friday night. The SCG would usually be used for finals in the event of a fixture clash at ANZ Stadium, but it was unavailable due to a redevelopment. Normally, it is AFL policy to schedule the highest ranked qualifying winner on the Friday night to give that team the longest time to prepare for the grand final the following week.
- There was a disagreement about the starting time of the first preliminary final. Hawthorn pushed for a day game to minimise the time difference between its game and the second preliminary final the night before; the AFL and broadcasters preferred a night time-slot to maximise television audiences. The AFL ultimately scheduled a twilight 5:15 pm AEST game as a compromise between the two drivers.
