= 2010 AFL finals series =

Australian Football League playoffs

2010 premiership season
- Date: 3 September – 2 October 2010
- Teams: 8
- Premiers: Collingwood (15th premiership)
- Runners-up: St Kilda (7th grand final)
- Minor premiers: Collingwood (18th minor premiership)

Attendance
- Matches played: 10
- Total attendance: 650,654 (65,065 per match)
- Highest: 100,016 (Grand Final, Collingwood vs. St Kilda)

The Australian Football League's 2010 finals series determined the top eight final positions of the 2010 AFL season. The series was scheduled to occur over four weekends in September 2010, culminating with the 114th AFL/VFL Grand Final at the Melbourne Cricket Ground on 25 September 2010. However, after Collingwood and St Kilda drew in the grand final, the series was extended to five weeks, ending on 2 October, with the first Grand Final replay since 1977 (and the last, due to rules changes in 2016). Collingwood won the replay by 56 points to become the 2010 premiers.

== The finals system ==
The system is a final eight system. This system is different from the McIntyre final eight system, which was previously used by the AFL.

The top four teams in the eight receive what is popularly known as the "double chance" when they play in week-one qualifying finals. This means that even if a top-four team loses in the first week, it still remains in the finals, playing a semi-final the next week against the winner of an elimination final. The bottom four of the eight play knock-out games, in that only the winners survive and move on to the next week. Home-state advantage goes to the team with the higher seed in the first two weeks, to the qualifying final winners in the third week. Games in Victoria are played at the MCG, regardless of the team's usual home ground, if a crowd larger than the seating capacity of Etihad Stadium (53,359) is expected.

In the second week, the winners of the qualifying finals receive a bye to the third week. The losers of the qualifying final plays the elimination finals winners in a semi-final. In the third week, the winners of the semi-finals from week two play the winners of the qualifying finals in the first week. The winners of those matches move on to the Grand Final at the MCG in Melbourne.

== Qualification ==
2010 AFL ladder
Pos	Team	Pld	W	L	D	PF	PA	PP	Pts	
1	Collingwood (P)	22	17	4	1	2349	1658	141.7	70	Finals series
2	Geelong	22	17	5	0	2518	1702	147.9	68	Finals series
3	St Kilda	22	15	6	1	1935	1591	121.6	62	Finals series
4	Western Bulldogs	22	14	8	0	2174	1734	125.4	56	Finals series
5	Sydney	22	13	9	0	2017	1863	108.3	52	Finals series
6	Fremantle	22	13	9	0	2168	2087	103.9	52	Finals series
7	Hawthorn	22	12	9	1	2044	1847	110.7	50	Finals series
8	Carlton	22	11	11	0	2143	1983	108.1	44	Finals series
9	North Melbourne	22	11	11	0	1930	2208	87.4	44	
10	Port Adelaide	22	10	12	0	1749	2123	82.4	40	
11	Adelaide	22	9	13	0	1763	1870	94.3	36	
12	Melbourne	22	8	13	1	1863	1971	94.5	34	
13	Brisbane Lions	22	7	15	0	1775	2158	82.3	28	
14	Essendon	22	7	15	0	1930	2402	80.3	28	
15	Richmond	22	6	16	0	1714	2348	73.0	24	
16	West Coast	22	4	18	0	1773	2300	77.1	16	

Source: AFL ladder
Rules for classification: 1) points; 2) percentage; 3) number of points for.
(P) Premiers

Collingwood won the minor premiership, followed by 2009 Grand finalists Geelong and St Kilda, while giving Western Bulldogs a second chance spot in the top four. Sydney and Fremantle, the only non-Victorian clubs in the finals series, finished equal on points, but Sydney earned a game against Carlton on percentage. Hawthorn finished 7th despite a poor start to the season.

== Summary of results ==
Qualifying and elimination finals
4 Sep, MCG
1	Collingwood	17.22 (124)
4	Western Bulldogs	8.14 (62)
5 Sep, ANZ Stadium
5	Sydney	14.15 (99)
8	Carlton	13.16 (94)
4 Sep, Subiaco Oval
6	Fremantle	14.10 (94)
7	Hawthorn	8.16 (64)
3 Sep, MCG
2	Geelong	11.13 (79)
3	St Kilda	12.11 (83)

Semi-finals
11 Sep, MCG
Western Bulldogs	11.11 (77)
Sydney	10.12 (72)
10 Sep, MCG
Geelong	20.15 (135)
Fremantle	10.6 (66)

Preliminary finals
17 Sep, MCG
Collingwood	18.12 (120)
Geelong	11.13 (79)
18 Sep, MCG
St Kilda	13.10 (88)
Western Bulldogs	8.16 (64)

Grand final and replay
25 Sep, MCG; Replay: 2 Oct MCG
Collingwood	9.14 (68)	16.12 (108)
St Kilda	10.8 (68)	7.10 (52)

== Week one ==
=== First qualifying final (Collingwood vs. Western Bulldogs) ===
First qualifying final
4 September, 7:20pm	Collingwood	def.	Western Bulldogs	MCG (crowd: 66,545)	Report
3.6 (24); 7.15 (57); 11.18 (84); 17.22 (124)	Q1; Q2; Q3; Final	0.5 (5); 3.7 (25); 5.11 (41); 8.14 (62)	Umpires: Vozzo, Nicholls, Chamberlain; Television broadcast: Ten / One
Swan, Sidebottom 3 L. Brown, Didak, Pendlebury 2 Cloke, Thomas, Dawes, Davis, Jolly 1	Goals	Griffen, Hall, Higgins 2 Hahn, Giansiracusa 1
Swan, Maxwell, Pendlebury, Thomas, O'Brien, Ball	Best	Griffen, Murphy, Hudson, Gilbee, Cross
Sharrod Wellingham (ankle)	Injuries	Callan Ward (elbow), Brian Lake (arm)
Nil	Reports	Barry Hall (using abusive language towards umpire Nicholls)
Collingwood was never challenged by the Bulldogs throughout the game. Collingwood midfielders Dane Swan (39 disposals, 3 goals), and Scott Pendlebury (30 disposals and 2 goals) controlled the game. The Bulldogs' best player was Ryan Griffen (34 disposals, 2 goals), who had come into the game under an injury cloud. Collingwood advanced to the preliminary final to play the winner of the second semi-final (Geelong), and the Bulldogs advanced to the first semi-final against Sydney.

=== Second qualifying final (Geelong vs. St Kilda) ===
Second qualifying final
3 September, 7:45pm	Geelong	def. by	St Kilda	MCG (crowd: 63,608)	Report
3.4 (22); 5.6 (36); 10.6 (66); 11.13 (79)	Q1; Q2; Q3; Final	4.7 (31); 8.8 (56); 11.11 (77); 12.11 (83)	Umpires: Rosebury, Stevic, Ryan; Television broadcast: Seven
Mooney 3 Johnson, Stokes, Varcoe 2 Byrnes, Chapman 1	Goals	Milne, Riewoldt 3 Gardiner, Goddard, Jones, Koschitzke, Montagna, Schneider 1
Bartel, Chapman, Ablett, Ling, Milburn	Best	Hayes, Riewoldt, Goddard, S Fisher, Milne, Dal Santo
St Kilda won in an upset against Geelong in the qualifying final. The Saints controlled the first half, and held a 33-point early in the third quarter, before Geelong fought back. The final quarter was played in heavy rain, and Geelong dominated general play, recording seventeen inside-50s to St Kilda's five; however, wayward goalkicking saw Geelong score 1.7 (13) to St Kilda's 1.0 (6). A potential go-ahead goal by Cameron Ling with one minute remaining was disallowed because Cameron Mooney pushed James Gwilt in the back during the tackle which set up the shot on goal. Although controversial, the free kick was deemed to be correct. Mooney and Geelong coach Mark Thompson were both criticised in the media for their response to the free kick, but neither was penalised by the AFL. St Kilda advanced to the preliminary final to play the winner of the first semi-final (Western Bulldogs), while Geelong advanced to the second semi-final against Fremantle.

=== First elimination final (Sydney vs. Carlton) ===
First elimination final
5 September, 2:40pm	Sydney	def.	Carlton	ANZ Stadium (crowd: 41,596)	Report
6.6 (42); 11.8 (74); 11.11 (77); 14.15 (99)	Q1; Q2; Q3; Final	4.3 (27); 7.8 (50); 12.12 (84); 13.16 (94)	Umpires: McBurney, Jeffery, McInerney; Television broadcast: Seven
Dennis-Lane 4 Bevan 3 Shaw 2 Jack, White, Goodes, Jetta, O'Keefe 1	Goals	Walker, Waite 3 Warnock, Garlett, Henderson 2 Murphy 1
Kennedy, Goodes, Kirk, Dennis-Lane, Shaw, Smith	Best	Judd, Waite, Walker, Jacobs, Carrazzo, Murphy
Sydney recorded a memorable elimination final win against Carlton at ANZ Stadium by five points. Sydney scored the first four goals of the game, and maintained that advantage at half time, but Carlton scored five unanswered goals in the third quarter to lead by seven points at three-quarter time. First-year forward Trent Dennis-Lane proved the match-winner in the final quarter, scoring two of the Swans' three goals, as Sydney won by five points. Josh Kennedy played his best game for the Swans, Brett Kirk effectively tagged Kade Simpson and Dennis-Lane finished with four crucial goals. Carlton captain Chris Judd was instrumental in Carlton's third-quarter fightback, while Marc Murphy was damaging through the midfield and Andrew Walker, who had played mainly in defence during the season, played forward and scored three goals.

=== Second elimination final (Fremantle vs. Hawthorn) ===
Second elimination final
4 September, 1:20pm	Fremantle	def.	Hawthorn	Subiaco Oval (crowd: 42,719)	Report
4.3 (27); 6.4 (40); 12.7 (79); 14.10 (94)	Q1; Q2; Q3; Final	1.4 (11); 1.11 (17); 4.13 (37); 8.16 (64)	Umpires: Donlon, Kennedy, Meredith; Television broadcast: Ten / One
Pavlich 3 Mayne 2 Broughton, Morabito, Sandilands, Walters, Hill, Crowley, McPhee, Mundy, Silvagni 1	Goals	Roughead 4 Franklin 2 Whitecross, Ladson 1
McPhee, Mundy, McPharlin, Broughton, Hill, Fyfe, Morabito	Best	Mitchell, Burgoyne, Sewell, Gibson, Skipper
Aaron Sandilands (knee)	Injuries	Peterson replaced in selected side by Ladson, Cyril Rioli (hamstring), Xavier Ellis (ankle)
Fremantle record its second win in a finals match in the club's history, overpowering Hawthorn by 30 points at Subiaco Oval. Fremantle built a 42-point lead at three-quarter time, while Hawthorn's goalkicking accuracy was poor, scoring 1.11 (17) in the first half. Hawthorn kicked four goals to two in the final quarter, but Fremantle withstood the minor challenge to win and advance to the second semi-final against Geelong. Tagger Adam McPhee was particularly influential on Luke Hodge, holding the former Norm Smith medallist to only five disposals in the first three-quarters.

== Week two ==
=== First semi-final (Western Bulldogs vs. Sydney) ===
First semi-final
11 September, 7:20pm	Western Bulldogs	def.	Sydney	MCG (crowd: 39,596)	Report
3.4 (22); 5.6 (36); 8.9 (57); 11.11 (77)	Q1; Q2; Q3; Final	3.4 (22); 8.4 (52); 8.9 (57); 10.12 (72)	Umpires: Rosebury, Stevic, Ryan; Television broadcast: Ten / One
Hall 4 Giansiracusa 3 Addison, Hooper, Grant, Murphy 1	Goals	Bradshaw 3 Goodes, Shaw 2 J Bolton, McGlynn, Jetta 1
Hall, Harbrow, Griffen, Boyd, Murphy, Picken, Giansiracusa	Best	Goodes, Kennelly, Kennedy, McVeigh, Jack, Malceski, Mattner, Kirk
Sydney entered as narrow favourites, having won its last five games, and with full forward Daniel Bradshaw and goalsneak Ben McGlynn back into the side. After a close first quarter, Sydney dominated the second quarter, kicking five goals in a row to lead by as much as 30 points. However, goals against the run of play to Bulldogs Barry Hall and debutante Andrew Hooper reduced the margin to 16 points at half time. The Bulldogs' played much better in the third quarter, scoring three goals to Sydney's none to tie the scores at three quarter time; the Swans missed several opportunities, scoring 0.5 (5) in the quarter. In a tight final quarter, the Bulldogs opened up a 13-point lead, and while Sydney brought the margin back to 5 points, the Bulldogs held on for the victory. The loss was the final game for Sydney captain Brett Kirk and coach Paul Roos, who had both pre-announced their retirements at the end of the season. The Bulldogs advance to their third consecutive preliminary final, a rematch of the 2009 preliminary final against St Kilda.

=== Second semi-final (Geelong vs. Fremantle) ===
Second semi-final
10 September, 7:45pm	Geelong	def.	Fremantle	MCG (crowd: 45,056)	Report
8.1 (49); 10.7 (67); 14.13 (97); 20.15 (135)	Q1; Q2; Q3; Final	1.1 (7); 4.2 (26); 7.6 (48); 10.6 (66)	Umpires: Vozzo, McBurney, Chamberlain; Television broadcast: Seven
S Johnson, Podsiadly, Stokes 3 Wojcinski 2 Bartel, Byrnes, Chapman, Hawkins, Ling, Mooney, Ottens, Selwood, Varcoe 1	Goals	Pavlich 4 Walters 3 Duffield, Fyfe, Mayne 1
Ablett, Wojcinski, Bartel, Chapman, Varcoe, Corey, Selwood, S Johnson	Best	Pavlich, Mundy, Walters, McPharlin, Broughton, Fyfe, M Johnson
Geelong scored eight goals to Fremantle's one in the first quarter of their semi-final to take a 42-point lead into quarter time. From there, Geelong was never seriously challenged, eventually winning by 69 points. Geelong dominated the disposal count, recording 484 disposals (the highest ever in a final) to Fremantle's 287. Geelong advanced to its fourth consecutive preliminary final, and the third of those to be played against Collingwood.

== Week three ==
=== First preliminary final (Collingwood vs. Geelong) ===
First preliminary final
17 September, 7:45pm	Collingwood	def.	Geelong	MCG (crowd: 95,241)	Report
7.2 (44); 13.7 (85); 16.11 (107); 18.12 (120)	Q1; Q2; Q3; Final	1.1 (7); 3.5 (23); 6.10 (46); 11.13 (79)	Umpires: Rosebury, Chamberlain, Ryan; Television broadcast: Seven
Cloke 3 Pendlebury, Sidebottom, Swan, Wellingham 2 Beams, Brown, Dawes, Didak, Johnson, Macaffer, Thomas 1	Goals	Varcoe, Stokes, Byrnes 2 Bartel, Johnson, Mooney, Ottens, Podsiadly 1
Swan, Pendlebury, Brown, Thomas, Toovey, Cloke, Didak	Best	Ablett, Varcoe, Bartel, Kelly
Ball (hamstring)	Injuries	Nil
Collingwood built a big lead early in the game, and Geelong was never able to bring the game back to competitive. At one stage, Collingwood led by over 80 points, before Geelong scored 8 second half goals to finish 41 points behind, meaning they missed out on competing in the AFL Grand Final for the first time since 2007. The Cats' 62-point half-time deficit was the largest that Geelong had faced in any game since Round 18, 1998 against Sydney.

=== Second preliminary final (St Kilda vs. Western Bulldogs) ===
Second preliminary final
18 September, 7:20pm	St Kilda	def.	Western Bulldogs	MCG (crowd: 62,694)	Report
1.5 (11); 3.6 (24); 10.10 (70); 13.10 (88)	Q1; Q2; Q3; Final	3.1 (19); 4.6 (30); 5.9 (39); 8.16 (64)	Umpires: Vozzo, McBurney, Stevic; Television broadcast: Ten / One
Riewoldt, Schneider 3 Milne, Koschitzke 2 Gardiner, McEvoy, Peake 1	Goals	Hahn 2 Addison, Giansiracusa, Gilbee, Grant, Hall, Picken 1
Riewoldt, Montagna, Dawson, Hayes, Gwilt, Fisher, Gram, Jones	Best	Ward, Cross, Lake, Picken, Boyd, Griffen
Despite being underdogs, the Bulldogs started the match well. In slippery conditions, the Bulldogs made the most of their opportunities to take a six-point lead at half time. In the third quarter, Nick Riewoldt inspired the Saints to a seven-goals-to-one quarter, opening up a 31-point lead from which the Bulldogs could not recover. It was the Bulldogs' third consecutive preliminary final loss, marked the final game of retiring captain Brad Johnson. St Kilda advanced to its second consecutive Grand Final.

== Weeks four and five ==
=== Grand final and replay (Collingwood vs. St Kilda) ===
Note: this article covers both the drawn grand final and the grand final replay

=== Scorecards ===
Grand final
25 September, 2:30pm	Collingwood	drew with	St Kilda	MCG (crowd: 100,016)	Report
4.2 (26); 7.8 (50); 7.13 (55); 9.14 (68)	Q1; Q2; Q3; Final	3.2 (20); 4.2 (26); 7.5 (47); 10.8 (68)	Umpires: Chamberlain, Rosebury, Ryan; Norm Smith Medal: Lenny Hayes; Television broadcast: Seven / 7mate National anthem: Cameron and Taylor Henderson
Cloke 2 Jolly, Blair, Didak, Thomas, Macaffer, O'Brien, Davis	Goals	Riewoldt, Milne, Goddard 2 Schneider, Koschitzke, Gilbert, Hayes
Shaw, Thomas, Swan, N. Brown, Maxwell, Pendlebury	Best	Hayes, Goddard, Fisher, Gilbert, Gwilt, Schneider
Prestigiacomo (groin), replaced in the side by N. Brown	Injuries	Gardiner (hamstring)
The third drawn Grand Final in VFL/AFL history, following previous draws in 1948 and 1977.

Grand final replay
2 October, 2:30pm	Collingwood	def.	St Kilda	MCG (crowd: 93,853)	Report
3.2 (20); 6.5 (41); 11.8 (74); 16.12 (108)	Q1; Q2; Q3; Final	0.2 (2); 1.8 (14); 4.9 (33); 7.10 (52)	Umpires: Chamberlain, Rosebury, Ryan; Norm Smith Medal: Scott Pendlebury; Television broadcast: Seven / 7mate National anthem: Julie Anthony
Dawes, Didak, Macaffer, Sidebottom 2 Goldsack, Johnson, Jolly, O'Brien, Swan, D. Thomas	Goals	Milne 2 Dal Santo, Gilbert, Goddard, Hayes, Koschitzke
Ball, N. Brown, Jolly, Pendlebury, Shaw, Sidebottom, D. Thomas, Wellingham	Best	Dawson, Gilbert, Goddard, Gwilt, Jones
Reid (leg)	Injuries	Eddy (arm), Fisher (hamstring)

== See also ==
- 2010 AFL season
