= Vic Belcher =

Australian rules footballer, coach, and umpire

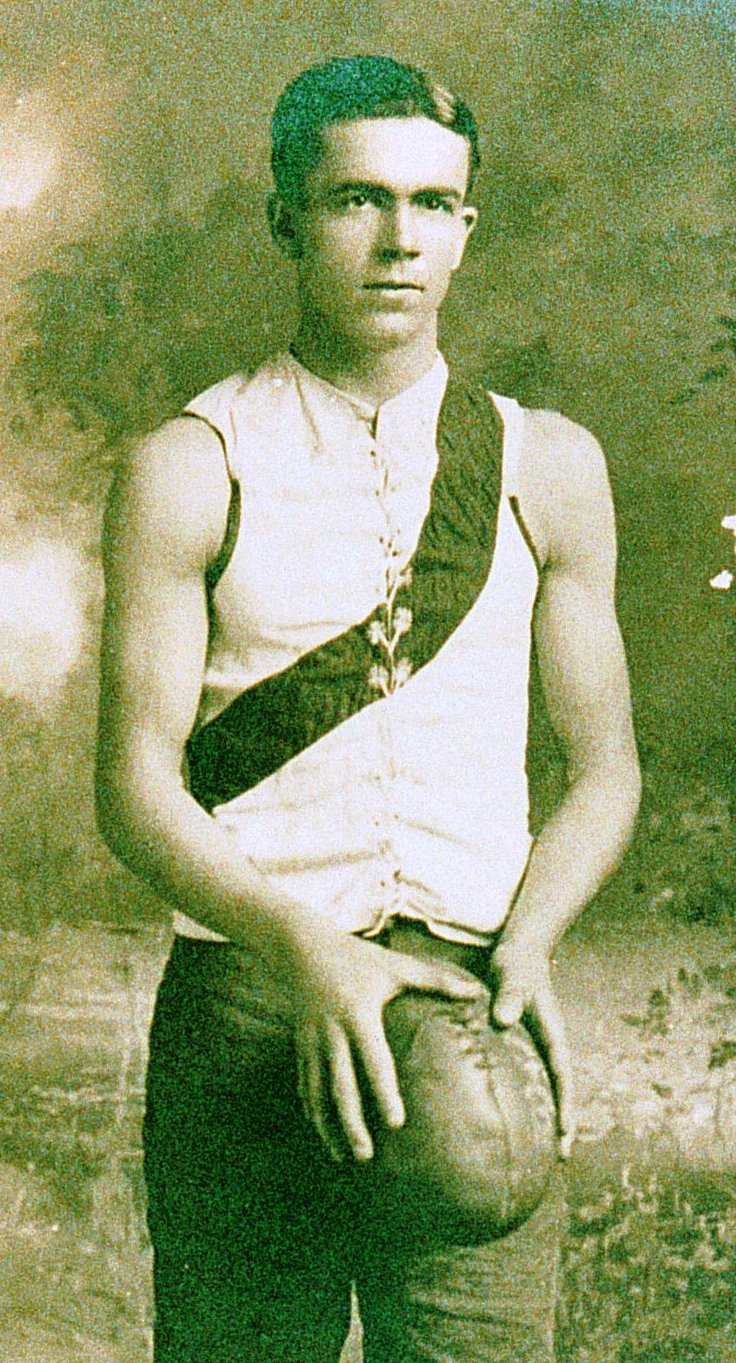

Personal information
- Full name: Victor George Belcher
- Born: 24 August 1888; Lebrina, near Launceston
- Died: 3 January 1977 (aged 88); Brunswick
- Original team: Brunswick
- Height: 180 cm (5 ft 11 in)
- Weight: 80 kg (176 lb)

Playing career^{1}
Years	Club	Games (Goals)	
1907–1920	South Melbourne	226 (62)	

Representative team honours
Years	Team	Games (Goals)	
1919	Victoria	2	

Coaching career^{3}
Years	Club	Games (W–L–D)	
1914–1917	South Melbourne	53 (30–21–1)	
1922–1924	Fitzroy	57 (37–19–1)	
1926–1927	Fitzroy	36 (12–23–1)	
Total		146 (80–63–3)	

Umpiring career
Years	League	Role	Games
1921 1930	VFL; VFL	Boundary umpire Boundary umpire	16; 1
- ^{1} Playing statistics correct to the end of 1920.^{3} Coaching statistics correct as of 1927.

Career highlights
- South Melbourne premiership player 1909, 1918; Fitzroy premiership coach 1922; Sydney Team of the Century; South Melbourne captain 1913–1915, 1917, 1920; Australian Football Hall of Fame 1996

Victor George Belcher (24 August 1888 – 3 January 1977) was an Australian rules footballer, coach and umpire in the (then) Victorian Football League.

== Early life and family ==
Belcher was born at Hall's Track (now known as Lebrina) north east of Launceston to William (a labourer) and Isabella Mary Belcher (née Mitchell). The family moved around Tasmania at the time, there having been two elder brothers born at New Norfolk, Allan (b 1884), and Albert Victor (b & d 1887) and in 1890 another brother Gabriel Lawrence was born at Formby (now Devonport). The family then moved to Victoria and in 1893 the birth of another brother Ernest Staley was registered in the Brunswick area of Melbourne.

== Playing career ==
By the time Vic was seventeen years old he was still in the Brunswick area where he played for both All Stars and Coburg (VJFA) before joining his brother, Allan, at Brunswick Football Club in August 1905.

Immediately successful as a defender, Belcher was selected in the back-pocket to represent the VFA in 1906 when they played the Bendigo and Northern District Association. That year he shared club's the best defender trophy. He was recruited by South Melbourne secretary Bert Howson and debuted for them in round 1, 1907. Despite residing in Brunswick, Belcher chose South because he supported them as a youth and cycled to the Lake Oval to train and play.

South made the 1907 grand final but lost to Carlton. Belcher began in defence but was moved to the ruck in the second quarter where he performed creditably. This match was an early indicator of Belcher's career. He was a tireless ruckman who could also play in a key position. South were premiers in 1909 and Belcher rucked the whole match.

In 1913 Belcher was elected South's captain, a position he would hold until 1917 and again in 1920. He had been stand-in captain in the 1912 semi-final against his brother's Essendon side and as a result they became the first brother's to not only captain opposing sides, but to also play on each other during the match. Essendon were victors. Two weeks later they met again in the grand final but not as captains as Charlie Ricketts had returned from injury. South lost again and not until 2013, did brothers face each other in a grand final.

Belcher was appointed South Melbourne captain-coach from 1914 to 1915 and 1917, losing the 1914 grand final and finishing fifth and seventh in the other seasons. South had withdrawn from the VFL in 1916 at the height of the First World War.

As vice-captain in 1918 Belcher won his second premiership with South and enhanced his reputation as a good finals player. Collingwood led by 12 points at the final break of the grand final but South switched Belcher from defence to the ruck and he was instrumental in a comeback that saw South win by five points. Until 2012 he was the only person in VFL/AFL history to win two premierships with the South Melbourne Swans.

Belcher represented Victoria against South Australia twice in 1919, both times he was elected captain.

Upon his retirement at the end of the 1920 season Jack Worrall assessed his career:

When he began playing senior football, Belcher was a ruckman, being as fine a performer in that position as any man playing. In his latter years he has been a noted defender, his coolness, judgement, fine marking qualities and dash making him an ideal back man and captain. Like the vast majority of champions Belcher has been fairness personified. He possesses fine spring and determination, was a hard man to beat and was a manly opponent

In 1996, Belcher was inducted into the Australian Football Hall of Fame and in 2003 was named in the Sydney Swans Team of the Century. He was the last survivor of the 1909 premiership team.

Belcher is one of only five dual South Melbourne/Sydney Swans premiership players, the other four being Jude Bolton, Adam Goodes, Ryan O'Keefe and Lewis Roberts-Thomson.

== Coaching career ==
As a playing-coach, Belcher guided South Melbourne in 53 matches. After a single season as an umpire in 1921 he was appointed coach of Fitzroy Football Club in 1922 and led them to that season's premiership. He continued in 1923–24, finishing second and third, respectively.

Having received a playing clearance from South Melbourne, he was recruited by City Football Club in the Launceston-based NTFA competition for the 1925 season. Belcher played regularly until a groin injury in a representative match ended his on-field season. City finished third for the season.

Belcher returned to Melbourne as non-playing coach of Fitzroy from 1926 to 1927; then, he moved to a junior team, East Brunswick, as playing-coach in 1928.

After a year on the committee, Belcher was appointed non-playing coach at Brunswick in 1932.

== Umpiring career ==
Belcher had two stints as an umpire with the VFL and a single season with the VFA.

In 1921, he applied for a position as an umpire with the VFL. He was accepted and made his debut as a boundary umpire in round two's Melbourne versus Collingwood match earning Heritage Number 134. Belcher umpired 16 VFL matches during the season, all on the boundary, and was appointed to the 1921 VFL Grand Final. He returned to coaching the following season.

In 1928, Belcher trialled as a boundary umpire for the VFL but was unsuccessful and instead field umpired in the VFA seconds for the season. He trialled again in 1930 and was placed on the VFL list as a field umpire. As a country field umpire he officiated in 14 matches for the season. He was appointed to the Benalla-Mulwala Association grand final which became a particularly violent match. It degenerated to a series of melees in the second half, although no blame was attached to Belcher.

During this period the VFL appointed one field umpire to senior matches as a boundary umpire in case of emergency. In this capacity Belcher officiated in his final senior match in round 5, 1930—Geelong versus Carlton.

After being elected to a committee position with the Brunswick Football Club in January 1931 Belcher umpired only a single country match that season before retiring from umpiring for the final time.
