= Ryan O'Keefe =

Australian rules footballer, born 1981

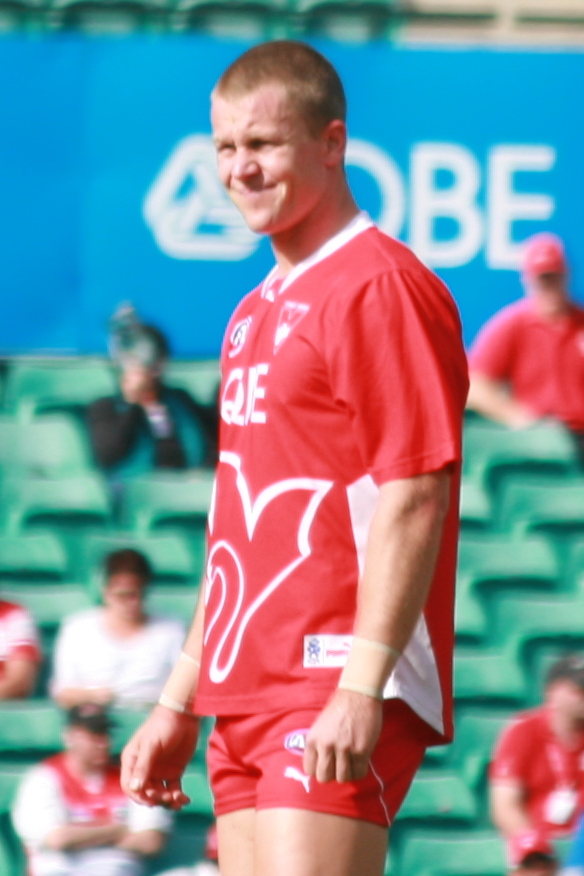
- O'Keefe with Sydney in 2009

Personal information
- Full name: Ryan O'Keefe
- Born: 24 January 1981 (age 45)
- Original team: Calder Cannons (TAC Cup)
- Draft: No. 56, 1999 National Draft, Sydney
- Height: 188 cm (6 ft 2 in)
- Weight: 88 kg (194 lb)
- Position: Midfielder

Playing career^{1}
Years	Club	Games (Goals)
2000–2014	Sydney	286 (261)

Representative team honours
Years	Team	Games (Goals)
2008	Victoria	1 (1)

International team honours
2005–2006	Australia	4 (0)
- ^{1} Playing statistics correct to the end of Round 4, 2014.

Career highlights
- 2× AFL premiership player: 2005, 2012; Norm Smith Medal: 2012; Bob Skilton Medal: 2009; All-Australian Team: 2006

Ryan O'Keefe (born 24 January 1981) is a former professional Australian rules footballer with the Sydney Swans in the Australian Football League (AFL), and was part of the Swans' 2005 and 2012 premiership-winning sides.

O'Keefe was a member of the 2006 All-Australian side and is key forwards. He is known for his fitness and running ability, as well as his marking overhead. He is also a left-foot kicker, which has served him well since he transformed from a defender to a forward early in his career with the Swans.

In 2015 Ryan began his coaching career as a midfield development coach with Adelaide.

== Early life ==
Ryan O'Keefe was educated at St Kevin's College in Melbourne, where he was the football team captain. He played for the Calder Cannons in the TAC Cup. In 1999, Ezra Bray lived with O'Keefe's family whilst on an AFL scholarship to attend Essendon Keilor College.

== AFL career ==
O'Keefe was drafted in the 1999 AFL draft with the 56th selection.

In 2002, O'Keefe's younger brother Aaron died in a car accident. His family had lost another son at nine months of age to sudden infant death syndrome when Ryan was 5 years old. He also has a younger sister and brother. His father Brian played football for Fitzroy reserves and his grandfather Lionel Ryan played for Footscray in the 1950s.

O'Keefe struggled to maintain his place in the Sydney side in his first few years at the club, but his form improved when he concentrated more on running and less on weight training. He also shifted from defence to a midfield and attack role.

=== 2005 ===
O'Keefe played all 26 games in Sydney's premiership year of 2005, having a particularly brilliant finals series, and was best on ground in the preliminary final win against St Kilda. In the same year, he represented Australia in the International Rules series.

=== 2006 ===
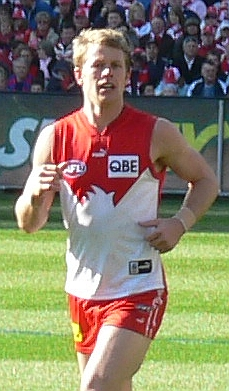
O'Keefe with Sydney in 2006

In 2006, he made All-Australian selection, and was once again selected to represent Australia in the International Rules series. He had a highly successful series, scoring more points than any other player. He was awarded the Jim Stynes medal for the best Australian player in the series.

O'Keefe played his 100th AFL game in Round 7 against Richmond. In what was also Paul Williams' 300th game, Sydney defeated Richmond by 118 points.

He came equal second in the running for the Bob Skilton Medal, which is annually awarded to the Best and Fairest player at the Sydney Swans, to one of the three Co-Captains, Brett Kirk.

=== 2007 ===
O'Keefe continued his All-Australian form of 2006 through the 07 season, finishing second in the votes for the Bob Skilton medal behind Brett Kirk.

=== 2008–2012 ===
After a strong start to the season, increased pressure was placed on O'Keefe following the suspension of troubled forward target Barry Hall. O'Keefe also played for the Victorian team for the one-off match in May, but instead of wearing his normal #5, he wore #1.

Following the 2008 Grand Final, O'Keefe signalled his intentions to continue his career elsewhere, specifically in Victoria - his place of birth, after knocking back an initial three-year contract offer by the Swans. After a suitable swap was not able to be arranged during the AFL's "trade week," however, O'Keefe decided against entering a pre-season draft where three teams outside Victoria had picks before any other Victorian teams. He then signed a 4-year contract with the Sydney Swans.

O'Keefe attracted press criticism after making a slow start to the 2009 season, but after moving into a midfield role he performed strongly through the majority of the 2009 season, and was rewarded by being selected as the Bob Skilton medallist for the season.

After a very impressive first month of play in 2010, O'Keefe suffered a concussion against the Brisbane Lions at the SCG which somewhat stalled his season. He also sustained a groin injury later in the year which severely hampered his ability to cover the ground with his elite endurance. Accordingly, he was prevented from spending whole games in the midfield and towards the end of the year he spent more and more time in the forward line. O'Keefe did manage to play some impressive football however, particularly against Hawthorn at the SCG when he blanketed Luke Hodge while kicking four goals himself (he was awarded three Brownlow votes for his game). Since the end of the season, O'Keefe has had groin surgery and will be able to participate in pre-season training.

Having recovered from his debilitating groin injury in 2010, O'Keefe returned to very strong and consistent form in 2011. He spent most of his time in the midfield, though did play some meaningful roles up forward late in the year, kicking 4 goals in the Elimination Final against St.Kilda at Etihad Stadium in a BOG performance and then kicking 3 the next week against Hawthorn in the Swans' Semi Final Loss at the MCG. O'Keefe finished 4th in the Bob Skilton Medal count for season 2011.

O'Keefe won the Norm Smith Medal after his side the Sydney Swans beat Hawthorn by 10 points in the 2012 AFL Grand Final, the first Swans player to do so since the medal's inception in 1979. O'Keefe finished 3rd in the 2012 Bob Skilton Medal after a superb season. He combined magnificently with the likes of Skilton Medal winner Josh Kennedy, Jarrad McVeigh, Kieren Jack, Lewis Jetta, Dan Hannebery and Craig Bird to become one of the best midfields in the competition. In August 2014, O'Keefe quit the Swans due to limited opportunities and was hoping to be picked up by another club next year. However, he announced his retirement a month later on in September, stating his intention to finish his career as a one-club player for Sydney.

== Coaching career ==
In October 2014, O'Keefe was appointed as a midfield development coach at Adelaide to begin his coaching career. In November 2016, he was appointed as coach of the club's SANFL team. After two years with Adelaide, O'Keefe replaced Torin Baker in December 2018 as coach of the Western Jets in the TAC Cup.

== Career highlights ==
- TAC Cup Team of the Year 1999
- International Rules Series 2005, 2006 (Jim Stynes Medal 2006)
- Sydney Swans Premiership player 2005
- All-Australian 2006
- Sydney Swans Premiership player 2012
- Norm Smith Medal 2012

== Statistics ==
Legend
G	Goals	K	Kicks	D	Disposals	T	Tackles
B	Behinds	H	Handballs	M	Marks

Season	Team	No.	Games	Totals							Averages (per game)						
Season	Team	No.	Games	G	B	K	H	D	M	T	G	B	K	H	D	M	T
2000	Sydney	39	5	1	0	14	10	24	9	4	0.2	0.0	2.8	2.0	4.8	1.8	0.8
2001	Sydney	5	13	6	4	78	20	98	20	14	0.5	0.3	6.0	1.5	7.5	1.5	1.1
2002	Sydney	5	9	12	8	62	32	94	33	14	1.3	0.9	6.9	3.6	10.4	3.7	1.6
2003	Sydney	5	16	17	5	74	35	109	41	22	1.1	0.3	4.6	2.2	6.8	2.6	1.4
2004	Sydney	5	24	33	17	244	103	347	124	56	1.4	0.7	10.2	4.3	14.5	5.2	2.3
2005	Sydney	5	26	31	33	280	105	385	128	65	1.2	1.3	10.8	4.0	14.8	4.9	2.5
2006	Sydney	5	25	32	22	356	119	475	178	64	1.3	0.9	14.2	4.8	19.0	7.1	2.6
2007	Sydney	5	23	23	18	282	122	404	122	83	1.0	0.8	12.3	5.3	17.6	5.3	3.6
2008	Sydney	5	23	23	26	303	149	452	113	68	1.0	1.1	13.2	6.5	19.7	4.9	3.0
2009	Sydney	5	22	13	7	287	238	525	95	117	0.6	0.3	13.0	10.8	23.9	4.3	5.3
2010	Sydney	5	23	17	15	269	210	479	98	98	0.7	0.7	11.7	9.1	20.8	4.3	4.3
2011	Sydney	5	24	20	20	317	226	543	75	139	0.8	0.8	13.2	9.4	22.6	3.1	5.8
2012	Sydney	5	24	20	7	329	271	600	72	156	0.8	0.3	13.7	11.3	25.0	3.0	6.5
2013	Sydney	5	25	12	11	308	267	575	96	164	0.5	0.4	12.3	10.7	23.0	3.8	6.6
2014	Sydney	5	4	1	0	24	20	44	11	11	0.3	0.0	6.0	5.0	11.0	2.8	2.8
Career			286	261	193	3227	1927	5154	1215	1075	0.9	0.7	11.3	6.7	18.0	4.2	3.8

== Personal life ==
In January 2008 O'Keefe married Tara Duggan and together they have a son Levi born September 2009 and a second child, Savannah, born in April 2012.

He was nominated for the Cleo Bachelor of the Year in 2005 and once dated Mary, Crown Princess of Denmark.
