= 2012 AFL Grand Final =

Grand final of the 2012 Australian Football League season

2012 Australian Football League Grand Final

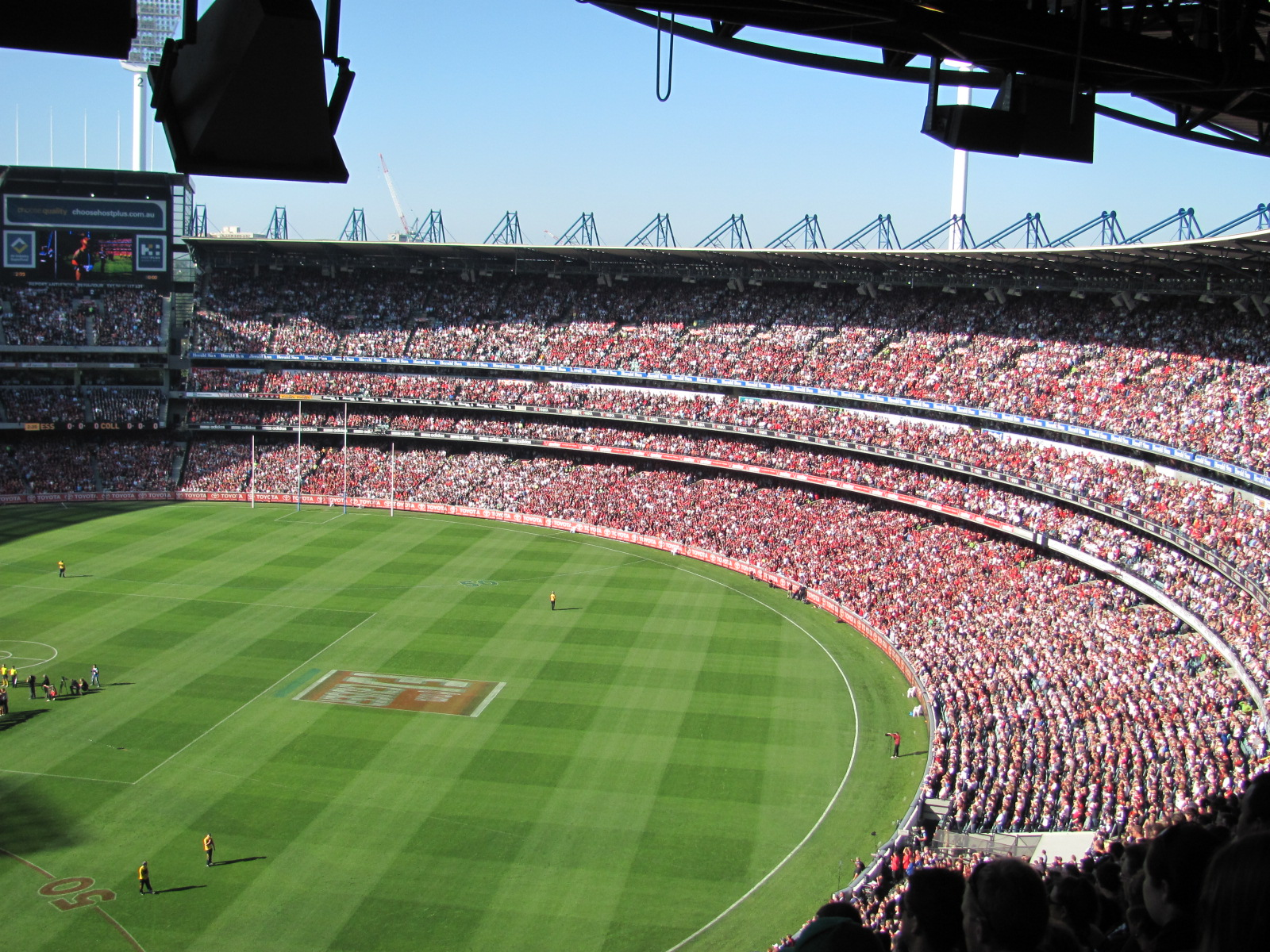
- The Melbourne Cricket Ground (pictured), where the 2012 AFL Grand Final was played.

Hawthorn	Sydney
11.15 (81)	14.7 (91)
	1	2	3	4
HAW	4.5 (29)	4.6 (30)	9.10 (64)	11.15 (81)
SYD	1.4 (10)	7.4 (46)	10.5 (65)	14.7 (91)
- Date: 29 September 2012, 2:30pm
- Stadium: Melbourne Cricket Ground
- Attendance: 99,683
- Favourite: Hawthorn
- Umpires: Simon Meredith, Brett Rosebury, Matt Stevic
- Coin toss won by: Hawthorn
- Kicked toward: City End

Ceremonies
- Pre-match entertainment: Paul Kelly, Tim Rogers
- National anthem: Marina Prior
- Halftime show: The Temper Trap
- Post-match entertainment: Paul Kelly, The Temper Trap

Accolades
- Norm Smith Medallist: Ryan O'Keefe (Sydney)
- Jock McHale Medallist: John Longmire (Sydney)

Broadcast in Australia
- Network: Seven Network
- Commentators: Bruce McAvaney (host and commentator); Dennis Cometti (commentator); Tom Harley (expert commentator); Leigh Matthews (expert commentator); Tim Watson (boundary rider); Matthew Richardson (boundary rider); Cameron Ling (analyst); Mick Malthouse (analyst)

The 2012 AFL Grand Final was an Australian rules football game contested between the Hawthorn Football Club and the Sydney Swans at the Melbourne Cricket Ground on 29 September 2012. It was the 117th annual grand final of the Australian Football League (formerly the Victorian Football League), staged to determine the premiers for the 2012 AFL season. The match, attended by 99,683 spectators, was won by Sydney by 10 points, marking the club's fifth VFL/AFL premiership victory. Sydney's Ryan O'Keefe was awarded the Norm Smith Medal as the best player on the ground.

== Background ==
Hawthorn entered the 2012 season having been eliminated in the preliminary finals in 2011 by Collingwood. Hawthorn's start to the year was average, with a record of 5–4 after nine matches; the team then won its next eight matches by an average of 81 points. A narrow loss against Geelong in Round 19 was its only other loss of the season, and Hawthorn finished the regular season on top of the AFL ladder with a win–loss record of 17–5. Hawthorn defeated Collingwood in its first qualifying final by 38 points to progress to the preliminary final, then beat Adelaide in a close preliminary final by five points to qualify for the grand final.

Sydney entered the 2012 season having been eliminated in the semi-finals by Hawthorn in 2011. Sydney won its first five matches of the season, before losing three of its next four matches to fall to 6–3; it then won its next nine matches by an average of 46.5 points; this streak took Sydney to the top of the ladder in Round 15, a position that the Swans held for seven weeks. Sydney lost three of its last four matches, including narrow losses to top four teams Hawthorn and Collingwood, to finish third with a record of 16–6. Sydney led from start to finish and beat Adelaide by 29 points in the qualifying final, then defeated Collingwood for the first time in 12 matches by 26 points in the preliminary final to qualify for the grand final.

The two matches between Hawthorn and Sydney were split this season. Sydney recorded a convincing 37-point victory at Aurora Stadium in Launceston, Tasmania, in Round 5, and Hawthorn recorded a narrow 7-point victory at the SCG in Round 22; it was the latter result which saw Hawthorn move ahead of Sydney on the premiership ladder.

Hawthorn was contesting its first grand final since its victory in 2008, and Sydney its first since being defeated in 2006. It was the first time the two clubs had met in a grand final.

== Media coverage ==
The match was televised by the Seven Network. The coverage commentators included Brian Taylor, Matthew Richardson, Cameron Ling, Michael Malthouse, Tom Harley, Luke Darcy and Leigh Matthews.

The primary match commentary was by Bruce McAvaney and Dennis Cometti

The network's coverage of the match peaked at 5.084 million viewers as the match neared its conclusion, with Sydney recording 795,000 and Melbourne recording a peak of 1.574 million.

Seven's parent company Seven West Media said the grand final reached "more than 6 million Australians" during the course of coverage.

== Pre-match entertainment ==
Following criticism of the performance of Meat Loaf at the 2011 AFL Grand Final, the AFL changed the format of the entertainment to have a small pre-match show, a larger half-time show, and, for the first time, a free concert open to the public at the Melbourne Cricket Ground after the match. Tim Rogers, who was featured in the AFL's finals series advertising campaign, and Paul Kelly performed before the game, and Marina Prior performed the national anthem; The Temper Trap performed at half-time on a stage on the arena. Kelly and The Temper Trap played at the post match concert.

The annual Grand Final Sprint was moved from half time to pre-match to accommodate the new entertainment schedule. Patrick Dangerfield (Adelaide) won his second consecutive Grand Final Sprint, with Harry Cunningham (Sydney) second and Angus Litherland (Hawthorn) third.

== Match summary ==
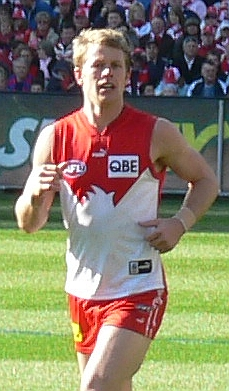
Ryan O'Keefe

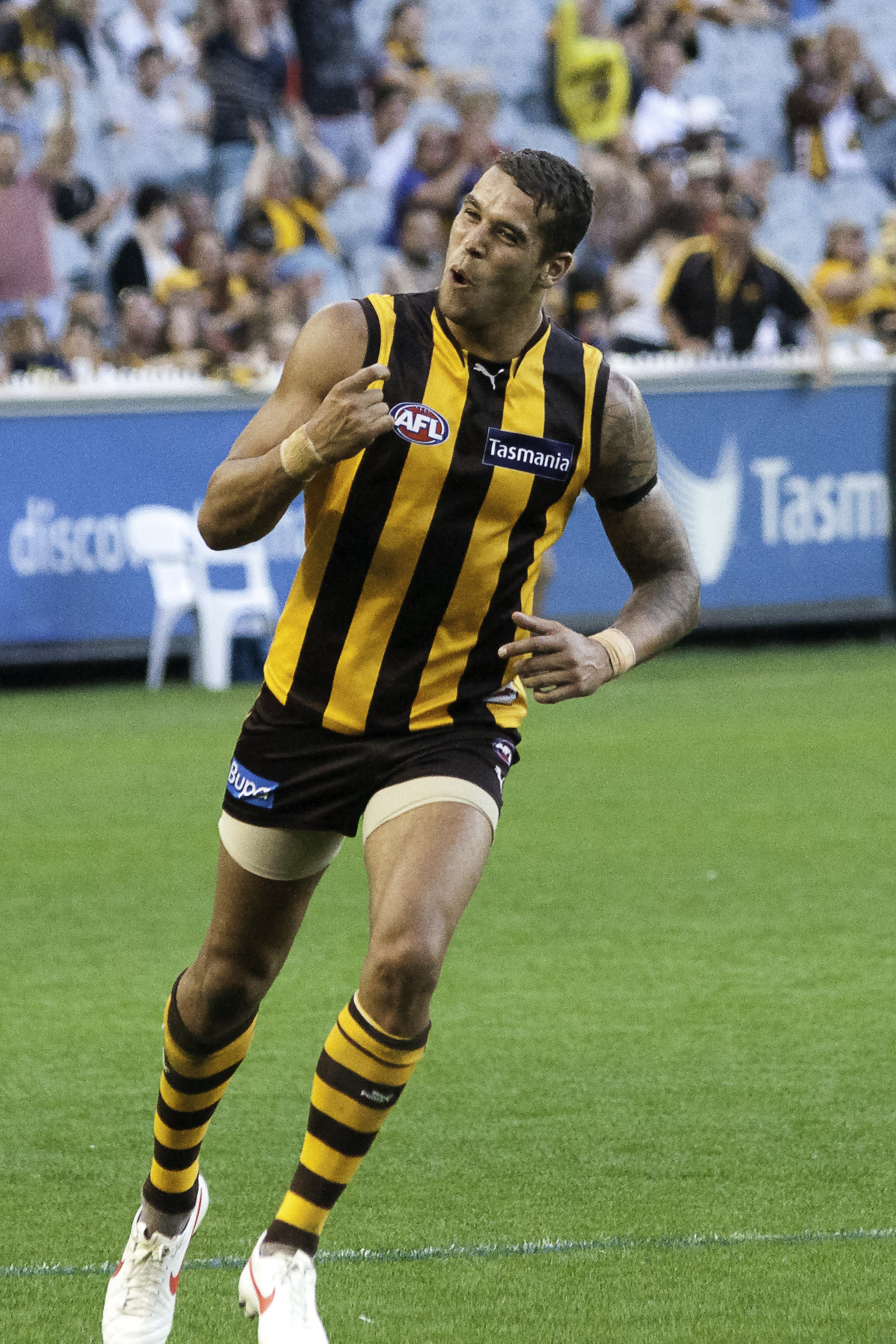
Hawthorn's Lance Franklin kicked three goals during the game, the most of any player on the ground

The match was played in dry, gusty conditions. Throughout most of the lead-up to the match, weather forecasts had been predicting heavy rain, with potential hail and thunderstorms for the match, but the worst of these predictions did not eventuate. Light rain fell during the halftime entertainment, but the weather for the match itself was primarily cloudy but dry with winds at the MCG trending towards the City End.

=== First quarter ===
Hawthorn won the toss and chose to attack the City End first. The first minutes of the match saw the ball move back and forth along the ground. Within a minute of play, Hawthorn's Lance Franklin had the first set shot on goal but missed to the left. Two minutes later, after a scramble at Sydney's attacking end, Lewis Jetta had a shot on goal that missed to the right. About 5½ minutes in, Hawthorn captain Luke Hodge was forced off the field because of a cut above his right eye. This injury would require him to come off the ground several times throughout the game. By six minutes in, Hawthorn pressed an attack at their forward 50 and finally got the first goal of the match from a quick opportunity by Xavier Ellis. One minute later, however, Sydney attacked back, and Nick Malceski hooked a shot from near the boundary to even the score. For the next 9 minutes, neither side could kick a goal. Although Hawthorn pressed an attack and dominated in possession, the result was only 0.4 for them and 0.1 for Sydney. Finally, near the 17th minute, Franklin took a mark on the forward 50 and kicked a goal. Sydney tried to respond with a rally of its own but Craig Bird and Lewis Roberts-Thomson both missed to the left; the trending wind was believed to be a factor in both behinds. Afterwards, Hawthorn got some good bounces and responded with two straight goals (by Luke Breust and Jack Gunston) in the 20th minute to take a nineteen-point lead to quarter time.

=== Second quarter ===
As much as the first quarter was dominated by Hawthorn, Sydney responded even more convincingly in the second, showing considerable improvement in tackling pressure and clearances, denying Hawthorn many opportunities despite plenty of time in the forward 50. At the 1st minute, Josh Kennedy took a mark and kicked a goal to begin closing the gap. Sydney would take two marks full forward and kick goals as a result, closing the gap to just one point: Kieren Jack near the 5th minute and Jarrad McVeigh in the 6th minute. Sydney finally took the lead halfway through the quarter on a rapid drive down the middle of the ground finished by a kick by Sam Reid from the forward 50. Hawthorn finally had a shot on goal at the 13th minute from a David Hale mark, but it missed left. Sydney's Mitch Morton then kicked consecutive goals at the 14th and 16th minutes. Hawthorn had two last shots in the closing two minutes, but both Franklin and Clinton Young kicked out on the full to the right. Sydney dominated the quarter with six goals to Hawthorn's lone behind, going from a 19-point deficit to a 16-point lead at half time.

=== Third quarter ===
Hawthorn's Jarryd Roughead opened the quarter with a set shot missing to the left. Between spells of back-and-forth play, Sydney managed to make two more goals from set shots: Kennedy in the 3rd minute, then Roberts-Thomson in the 6th minute. Kennedy almost had another in the 8th minute but hit the post to extend the margin to 28: the largest at any point in the match. Then Hawthorn started a 5.2 comeback: goals from David Hale, Franklin (2) Gunston, and Isaac Smith and behinds from Franklin and Matt Suckling (rushed) took them to a four-point lead. At this point, Hawthorn took out Xavier Ellis to bring in substitute Shane Savage. However, a crucial moment in the 18th minute in which Sam Mitchell gave away a 50-metre penalty saw Sydney captain McVeigh kick the resultant goal to regain the lead for Sydney. Roughead crumbed one final shot at goal but hit the post, cutting Sydney's lead to just one point going into the final break.

=== Final quarter ===
Within one minute, Breust kicked his second goal, followed by another from Hale one minute later and a Franklin behind to give Hawthorn the lead by 12. After trading behinds with Hawthorn, Sydney finally substituted out Shane Mumford for Luke Parker, and they found opportunities with a goal from Dan Hannebery at the 9th minute. Meanwhile, Hodge's cut re-opened, forcing him off the field for several crucial minutes while they tried to bandage it. After several more back-and-forth minutes, Jack finally leveled the scores at 78 each with his second goal. After Sydney forced a rushed behind to take a one-point lead, they stretched the lead to seven with a crumbing goal by Adam Goodes. Hawthorn then pressed a lengthy attack in the forward 50 but could not convert on three opportunities: Gunston hit the post while two quick kicks from Brad Sewell went wide; they would only cut the lead to four. Finally, Sydney cleared the ball and pressed their own attack. With less than 40 seconds left, Nick Malceski snapped the clinching goal from a pack in Sydney's forward line: the final score of the match. Hawthorn made a determined effort to come back, but Sydney played physically to deny them progress, keeping the ball at center square until the final siren. Sydney won by ten points: 14.7 (91) to 11.15 (81).

=== Overall report ===
The match in aggregate was a very even affair, with both sides dominating large passages of play. There is contention in who played better on the day, with Hawthorn missing key opportunities and registering more scoring shots. Despite this, It is generally agreed that Sydney performed at key points in the game, including the last 10 minutes, with goals to Adam Goodes and Nick Malceski effectively sealing the game for Sydney. Overall, the game was called as one of the best in modern times by Bruce McAvaney and Dennis Cometti, who were commentating on the day, for its sportsmanship and contest.

Four members of the Sydney Swans' 2005 premiership team – Jude Bolton, Adam Goodes, Ryan O'Keefe and Lewis Roberts-Thomson – joined Vic Belcher as the only dual South Melbourne/Sydney Swans premiership players with the victory.

=== Norm Smith Medal ===
Norm Smith Medal voting tally
Position	Player	Club	Total votes	Vote summary
1st (winner)	Ryan O'Keefe	Sydney Swans	12	3,3,3,2,1
2nd	Brad Sewell	Hawthorn	7	3,2,2
3rd - tied	Lance Franklin	Hawthorn	5	2,2,1
3rd - tied	Dan Hannebery	Sydney Swans	5	3,1,1
5th	Jarrad McVeigh	Sydney Swans	1	1

The Norm Smith Medal was won by Sydney's Ryan O'Keefe, who had 28 disposals and 15 tackles for the match. O'Keefe polled 12 out of a maximum possible 15 votes for the award. Ryan O'Keefe became the first man in South Melbourne/Sydney Swans history to win the Norm Smith Medal, making him one of the club's most decorated players in history with two premierships and a Norm Smith Medal.

Hawthorn's Brad Sewell finished second, with seven votes. Sydney's Dan Hannebery and Hawthorn's Lance Franklin both polled five votes and Sydney captain Jarrad McVeigh polled one vote.

Chaired by Brett Ratten, the voters and their choices were as follows:

Voter	Role	3 votes	2 votes	1 vote
Brett Ratten	Former AFL Player	Brad Sewell	Ryan O'Keefe	Lance Franklin
Neil Cordy	The Daily Telegraph	Ryan O'Keefe	Lance Franklin	Jarrad McVeigh
Mick Malthouse	Channel 7	Ryan O'Keefe	Brad Sewell	Dan Hannebery
Tim McGrath	Former AFL Player	Dan Hannebery	Brad Sewell	Ryan O'Keefe
Drew Morphett	ABC	Ryan O'Keefe	Lance Franklin	Dan Hannebery

== Teams ==
Sydney did not change its team from the previous week's preliminary final, while Hawthorn omitted Tom Murphy in favour of the club's captain, Luke Hodge, who had been absent with illness the previous week:

Hawthorn	Sydney

Hawthorn
B:	14 Grant Birchall	6 Josh Gibson	24 Ben Stratton
HB:	4 Matt Suckling	25 Ryan Schoenmakers	9 Shaun Burgoyne
C:	3 Jordan Lewis	5 Sam Mitchell	16 Isaac Smith
HF:	19 Jack Gunston	23 Lance Franklin	22 Luke Breust
F:	33 Cyril Rioli	2 Jarryd Roughead	28 Paul Puopolo
Foll:	20 David Hale	15 Luke Hodge (c)	12 Brad Sewell
Int:	11 Clinton Young	26 Liam Shiels	8 Xavier Ellis
Int:	21 Shane Savage (sub)		
Coach:	Alastair Clarkson		

Sydney
B:	2 Rhyce Shaw	25 Ted Richards	29 Martin Mattner
HB:	34 Alex Johnson	39 Heath Grundy	40 Nick Smith
C:	32 Lewis Jetta	15 Kieren Jack	3 Jarrad McVeigh (c)
HF:	14 Craig Bird	20 Sam Reid	5 Ryan O'Keefe
F:	38 Mike Pyke	37 Adam Goodes	30 Lewis Roberts-Thomson
Foll:	41 Shane Mumford	12 Josh Kennedy	24 Jude Bolton
Int:	9 Nick Malceski	4 Dan Hannebery	10 Mitch Morton
Int:	26 Luke Parker (sub)		
Coach:	John Longmire		

Umpires

The umpiring panel for the grand final comprised nine match day umpires and three emergencies. Among the umpires were four grand final debutants: field umpires Matt Stevic and Simon Meredith, boundary umpire Rob Haala and goal umpire Chelsea Roffey. Roffey became the first woman to officiate in an AFL grand final.

2012 AFL Grand Final umpires
Position	Umpire 1	Umpire 2	Umpire 3	Umpire 4	Emergency
Field:	8 Brett Rosebury (5)	9 Matt Stevic (1)	21 Simon Meredith (1)		Mathew Nicholls
Boundary:	Ian Burrows (4)	Jonathan Creasey (4)	Mark Foster (5)	Rob Haala (1)	Chris Gordon
Goal:	Chelsea Roffey (1)	Luke Walker (4)			Adam Wojcik

Numbers in brackets represent the number of grand finals umpired; this number includes 2012 and does not include times selected as an emergency umpire.

== Scorecard ==
Grand Final
Saturday, 29 September (2:30 pm)	Hawthorn	def. by	Sydney	MCG (crowd: 99,683)	Report
4.5 (29); 4.6 (30); 9.10 (64); 11.15 (81)	Q1; Q2; Q3; Final	1.4 (10); 7.4 (46); 10.5 (65); 14.7 (91)	Umpires: Rosebury, Stevic, Meredith; Norm Smith Medal: Ryan O'Keefe (Sydney); Television broadcast: Seven Network; National anthem: Marina Prior
Franklin 3 Breust, Gunston, Hale 2 Ellis, Smith 1	Goals	2 Jack, Kennedy, Malceski, McVeigh, Morton; 1 Goodes, Hannebery, Reid, Roberts-Thomson
Franklin, Sewell, Burgoyne, Mitchell, Breust, Hale	Best	Hannebery, O'Keefe, Kennedy, McVeigh, Jetta, Goodes
Ellis (calf), Hodge (head)	Injuries	Goodes (knee), Johnson (wrist)
Nil	Reports	Nil

== See also ==
- 2012 AFL finals series
- 2012 AFL season
- 2012 NAB Cup
