= Simon Meredith =

Simon Meredith may refer to:

- Simon Meredith (Emmerdale), a character on the ITV soap opera Emmerdale
- Simon Meredith (umpire) (born 1975), Australian rules football field umpire
