= Chelsea Roffey =

Australian journalist and goal umpire

Chelsea Roffey (born 1 August 1981) is a journalist and a goal umpire in the Australian Football League (AFL).

Roffey was born in South Australia. She began her goal-umpiring career in Brisbane, Queensland, eventually making her AFL goal-umpiring debut in 2004. Roffey became the first woman to officiate an AFL Grand Final when she was selected as goal umpire for the 2012 Grand Final. In 2024 she officiated at her 300th AFL game.
