= NSW/ACT Rams =

Australian rules football team

NSW/ACT (also known as NSW-ACT and nicknamed the 'Rams'), is an underage Australian rules football representative team managed by AFL NSW/ACT. The team represents New South Wales and the Australian Capital Territory and its moniker, partly derived as an acronym from Riverina, ACT, Murrumbidgee and Sydney, the four regions supplying the bulk of the team's squad, also evokes the rural nature of the area. The team is based at the Blacktown International Sports Park in Western Sydney and has training hubs in Canberra, Sydney, Albury, Wodonga, Newcastle and Coffs Harbour. It has both Under 16 and Under 18 squads for male and female players.

The Rams joined the TAC Cup competition in 1996 with another non-Victorian team, the Tassie Mariners and also participated in the AFL National Championships. Both sides left the competition in 2002 when the TAC Cup became a Victorian-focused competition. The Rams then played around three or four games a year, with players instead playing club football on the remaining weeks of the year. Prior to the 2014 season, the NSW/ACT Rams was reestablished as a TAC Cup team, with players from the Sydney Swans and Greater Western Sydney Giants young academy sides being picked for the NSW/ACT team. The team played only 7 games in the competition and could not qualify for finals like the Victorian teams in the competition.

NSW/ACT have claimed 8 Division 2 titles in the AFL National Championships however were dropped from both the AFL National Championships and Talent League in 2017 in favour of a club Academy Series featuring the Sydney Swans Academy and Greater Western Sydney Giants Academy.

== AFL players ==
The following former NSW/ACT Rams players have gone on to play in the Australian Football League:

- Tony Armstrong – Adelaide
- Paul Bevan – Sydney
- Craig Bird – Sydney
- Craig Bolton – Brisbane Lions/Sydney
- Nick Davis – Collingwood/Sydney
- Ryan Davis – West Coast
- Ben Fixter – Sydney
- Brad Fuller – Collingwood
- Ray Hall – Richmond
- Lenny Hayes – St Kilda
- Malcolm Lynch – Western Bulldogs
- Jarrad McVeigh – Sydney
- Mark McVeigh – Essendon
- Cameron Mooney – North Melbourne/Geelong
- Henry Playfair – Geelong/Sydney
- Lewis Roberts-Thomson – Sydney
- Aaron Rogers – Melbourne/Sydney
- Adam Schneider – Sydney/St Kilda
- Brent Staker – West Coast/Brisbane Lions
- Taylor Walker – Adelaide
- Josh Wooden – West Coast
- Jacob Townsend - Greater Western Sydney/Richmond
- Isaac Heeney - Sydney
- Luke Breust - Hawthorn

== See also ==
- TAC Cup
- AFL draft
