= Paul Bevan =

Australian rules footballer

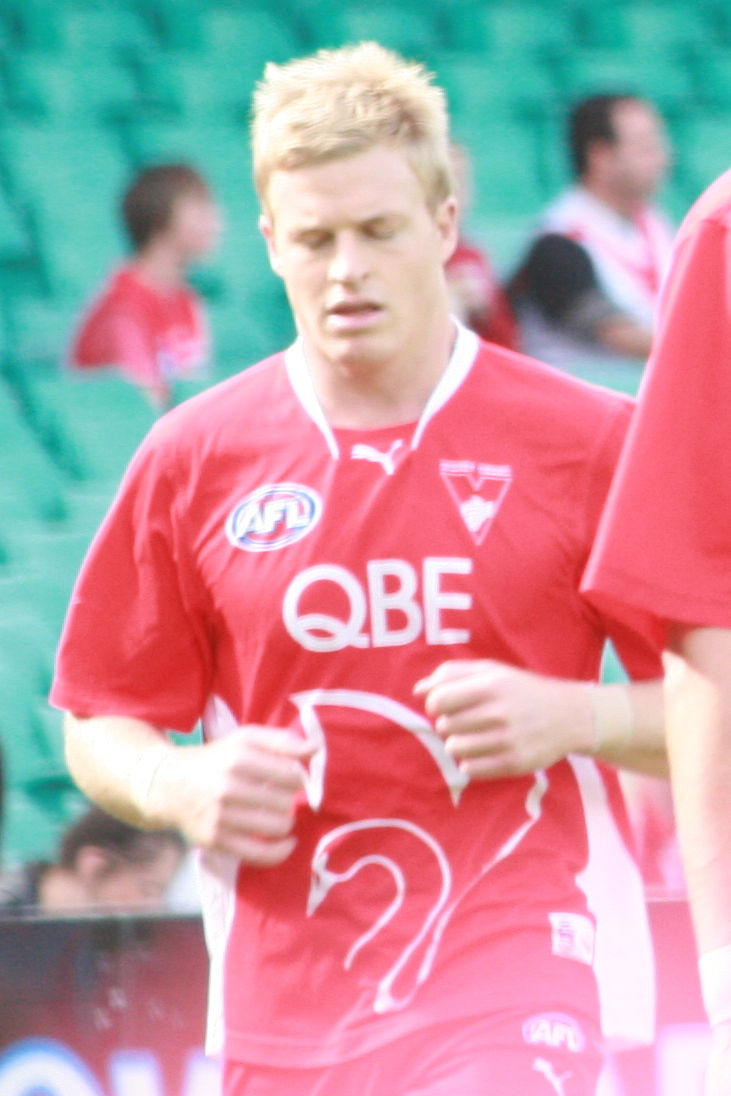
- Bevan with Sydney in 2009

Personal information
- Full name: Paul Bevan
- Born: 27 September 1984 (age 42)
- Original teams: Western Suburbs Magpies (Sydney AFL); NSW/ACT Rams (TAC Cup)
- Height: 184 cm (6 ft 0 in)
- Weight: 83 kg (183 lb)
- Position: Utility

Playing career^{1}
Years	Club	Games (Goals)
2003–2011	Sydney	129 (39)
- ^{1} Playing statistics correct to the end of 2011.

Career highlights
- NAB AFL Rising Star Nomination 2004; Sydney premiership player 2005

Paul Bevan (born 27 September 1984) is an Australian rules football player with the Sydney Swans of the Australian Football League (AFL).

Having grown up in Central Coast and later Sydney, playing for Western Suburbs Magpies AFC in the Sydney AFL and the NSW/ACT under-18s team, he was elevated from the Swans' rookie list in 2004. He was initially drafted in the 2003 AFL rookie draft with pick 64.

He played 24 senior games in that year and earned a nomination for the Rising Star award in round four. In 2005, he played 15 games and was a member of the Swans' first premiership winning team in 72 years.

In 2010, Bevan managed to solidify his place in the senior side again. He played mostly in defence but also appeared in the forward line, where he had trained all off season, to good effect. His best game of the year was possibly the Elimination Final against Carlton, in which he kicked 3 goals as a dangerous small forward. He was dropped along with Jesse White the next week however as Ben McGlynn and Daniel Bradshaw were brought back from injury. He requested a trade to a Victorian club due to his omission from the finals side, but no trade was arranged and he stayed a Swan in 2011. Bevan was delisted by the Swans after he struggled to find form and consistency in the last few years.

Bevan has played for the Perth Demons in the WAFL (Western Australia) for the past two years.

== Statistics ==
Legend
G	Goals	K	Kicks	D	Disposals	T	Tackles
B	Behinds	H	Handballs	M	Marks

Season	Team	No.	Games	Totals							Averages (per game)						
Season	Team	No.	Games	G	B	K	H	D	M	T	G	B	K	H	D	M	T
2004	Sydney	42	24	7	2	132	102	234	75	46	0.3	0.1	5.5	4.3	9.8	3.1	1.9
2005	Sydney	42	15	3	1	68	51	119	34	36	0.2	0.1	4.5	3.4	7.9	2.3	2.4
2006	Sydney	42	9	0	1	70	36	106	45	36	0.0	0.1	7.8	4.0	11.8	5.0	4.0
2007	Sydney	42	17	3	1	109	94	203	83	35	0.2	0.1	6.4	5.5	11.9	4.9	2.1
2008	Sydney	42	24	10	10	182	133	315	124	86	0.4	0.4	7.6	5.5	13.1	5.2	3.6
2009	Sydney	42	19	2	3	132	137	269	99	53	0.1	0.2	6.9	7.2	14.2	5.2	2.8
2010	Sydney	42	14	9	9	120	87	207	78	35	0.6	0.6	8.6	6.2	14.8	5.6	2.5
2011	Sydney	42	7	5	7	38	25	63	14	37	0.7	1.0	5.4	3.6	9.0	2.0	5.3
Career			129	39	34	851	665	1516	552	364	0.3	0.3	6.6	5.2	11.8	4.3	2.8

== Family ==
He is the great nephew of rugby league legend Brian Bevan.
