= Craig Bird =

Australian rules footballer

Personal information
- Full name: Craig Bird
- Born: 21 January 1989 (age 37)
- Original teams: NSW/ACT Rams (TAC Cup); Nelson Bay (BDAFL)
- Draft: No. 59, 2007 national draft
- Height: 180 cm (5 ft 11 in)
- Weight: 85 kg (187 lb)
- Position: Midfielder

Playing career^{1}
Years	Club	Games (Goals)
2008–2015	Sydney	137 (56)
2016–2017	Essendon	20 (3)
Total		157 (59)
- ^{1} Playing statistics correct to the end of 2017.

Career highlights
- AFL premiership player: 2012

Craig Bird (born 21 January 1989) is a former professional Australian rules footballer who played for the Sydney Swans and Essendon Football Club in the Australian Football League (AFL).

He was drafted to the Swans with the 59th pick in the 2007 AFL draft after previously being part of the NSW AFL scholarship program. He was recruited from Nelson Bay and made his debut in round one of 2008 season, wearing the number 14 guernsey, previously worn by club legends Paul Kelly and Bob Skilton. At the end of the 2008 season he was named as the Sydney Swans Rising Star of 2008 tied with Kieren Jack.

His 2010 season was delayed due to a stress fracture of the toe.

Bird enjoyed his best year at the Swans in 2011, managing to play 22 out of 24 games for the season. Bird was given a tagging role for much of the year and played the role exceptionally well for the most part. He played on some of the best midfielders in the league over the course of the season. However his best performance of the year came against the Western Bulldogs in round 18 when he kicked 4 goals as a defensive forward having been given the job of limiting the influence of dangerous rebounding defender, Robert Murphy.

Bird continued his consistent run of form in 2012 as he played on the competition's best midfielders and running defenders. Bird took his place in the Swans' 22 for the 2012 AFL Grand Final victory and went on to finish 9th in the 2012 Bob Skilton Medal, the highest placing of his career to date. After the 2012 AFL Premiership, Craig Bird has been regularly referred to in popular culture by the nicknames "Premiership Bird" and "PB", owing to his significant contribution during the Sydney Swans Premiership victory.

By 2015, however he had lost a regular spot in the side, as talent such as Tom Mitchell and Jake Lloyd cemented their spots. This left Bird struggling for opportunities.

In October 2015, Bird was traded to the Essendon Football Club.

At the conclusion of the 2017 season, he was delisted by Essendon.

== Statistics ==
Statistics are correct to the end of round 5, 2015

Legend
G	Goals	K	Kicks	D	Disposals	T	Tackles
B	Behinds	H	Handballs	M	Marks

Season	Team	No.	Games	Totals							Averages (per game)						
Season	Team	No.	Games	G	B	K	H	D	M	T	G	B	K	H	D	M	T
2008	Sydney	14	21	8	3	144	144	288	62	47	0.4	0.1	6.9	6.9	13.7	3.0	2.2
2009	Sydney	14	15	5	3	108	130	238	41	48	0.3	0.2	7.2	8.7	15.9	2.7	3.2
2010	Sydney	14	4	1	0	35	34	69	14	11	0.3	0.0	8.8	8.5	17.3	3.5	2.8
2011	Sydney	14	22	11	9	184	170	354	43	113	0.5	0.4	8.4	7.7	16.1	2.0	5.1
2012	Sydney	14	25	12	12	220	207	427	69	105	0.5	0.5	8.8	8.3	17.1	2.8	4.2
2013	Sydney	14	23	10	5	269	152	421	53	84	0.4	0.2	11.7	6.6	18.3	2.3	3.7
2014	Sydney	14	21	6	5	206	209	415	58	105	0.3	0.2	9.8	10.0	19.8	2.8	5.0
2015	Sydney	14	5	3	1	48	49	97	15	19	0.6	0.2	9.6	9.8	19.4	3.0	3.8
Career			136	56	38	1214	1095	2309	355	532	0.4	0.3	8.9	8.1	17.0	2.6	3.9
