= Matt Stevic =

Australian rules football field umpire

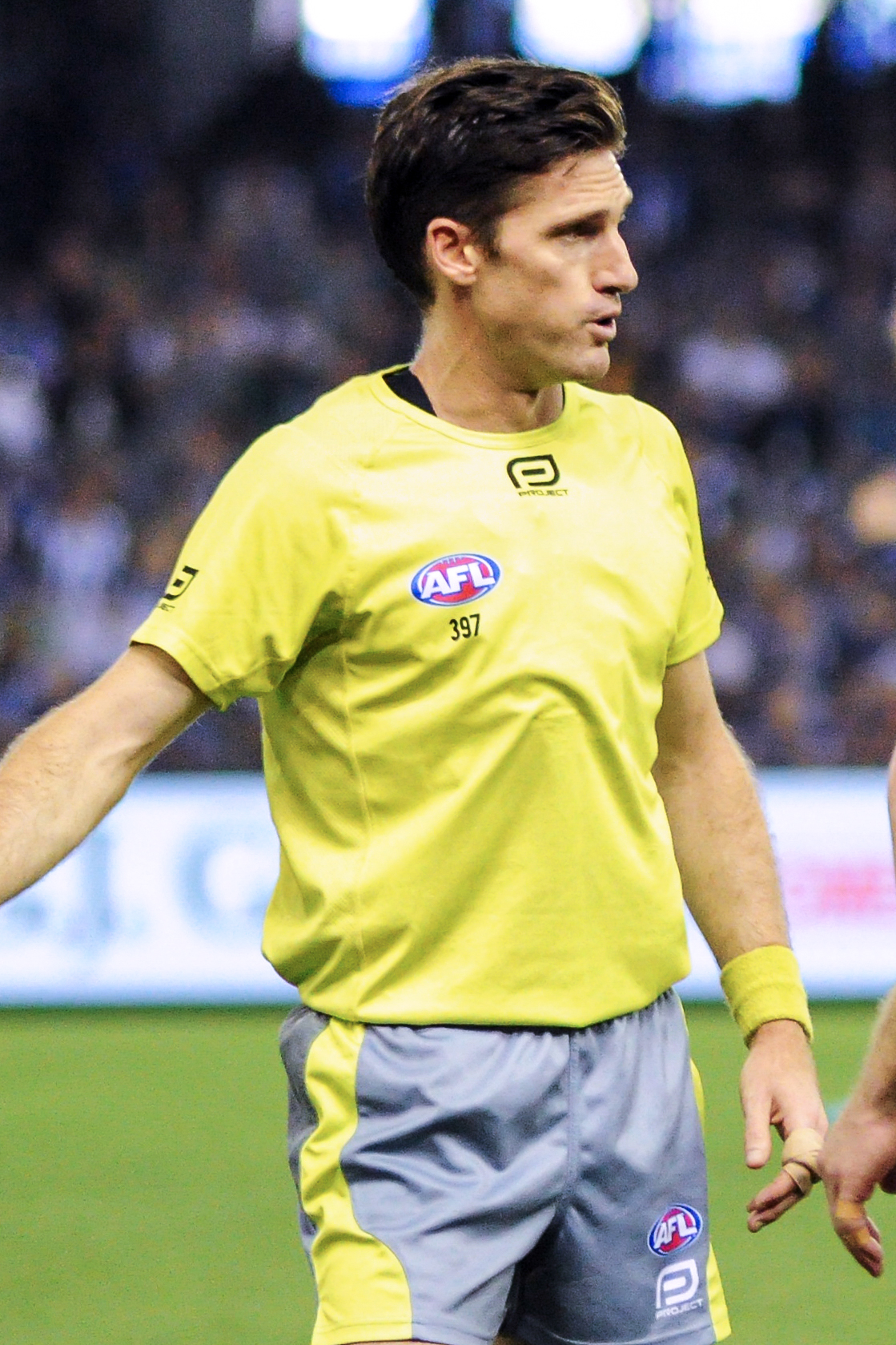
- Stevic in April 2018

Personal information
- Full name: Matthew Stevic
- Born: 12 November 1979 (age 46); Leongatha, Victoria

Umpiring career
Years	League	Role	Games
2004–present	AFL	Field umpire	509

Career highlights
- 12× AFL grand finals: 2012, 2014, 2015, 2016, 2017, 2018, 2019, 2020, 2021, 2022, 2023, 2024 (league record); 60× AFL finals (league record)

Matthew Stevic (born 12 November 1979) is an Australian rules football field umpire in the Australian Football League (AFL).

Stevic was born in Leongatha, Victoria. He made his debut umpiring his first match in the AFL in Round 1, 2004, between the Western Bulldogs and the West Coast Eagles at the Telstra Dome, and he has since umpired internationally.

He used to teach physical education, business management and geography at secondary schools, including Melbourne Grammar, Scotch College and Xavier College.

Stevic has umpired in a record twelve grand finals. Stevic umpired his first grand final alongside Brett Rosebury and Simon Meredith, which was the 2012 AFL Grand Final; after not being selected in 2013, he umpired in every grand final from 2014 until 2024. Since the 2023 grand final, his eleventh, he has held the outright record for most VFL/AFL grand finals umpired, surpassing the long-standing record held by Jack Elder. As of the end of the 2025 season, he has umpired a total of 63 finals matches in his career, also a VFL/AFL record; and 517 career AFL games, the third-most of any umpire.

Stevic studied applied science (sport coaching and administration) at Deakin University with a major in sport coaching.
