= Lewis Roberts-Thomson =

Former Australian rules footballer, born 1983

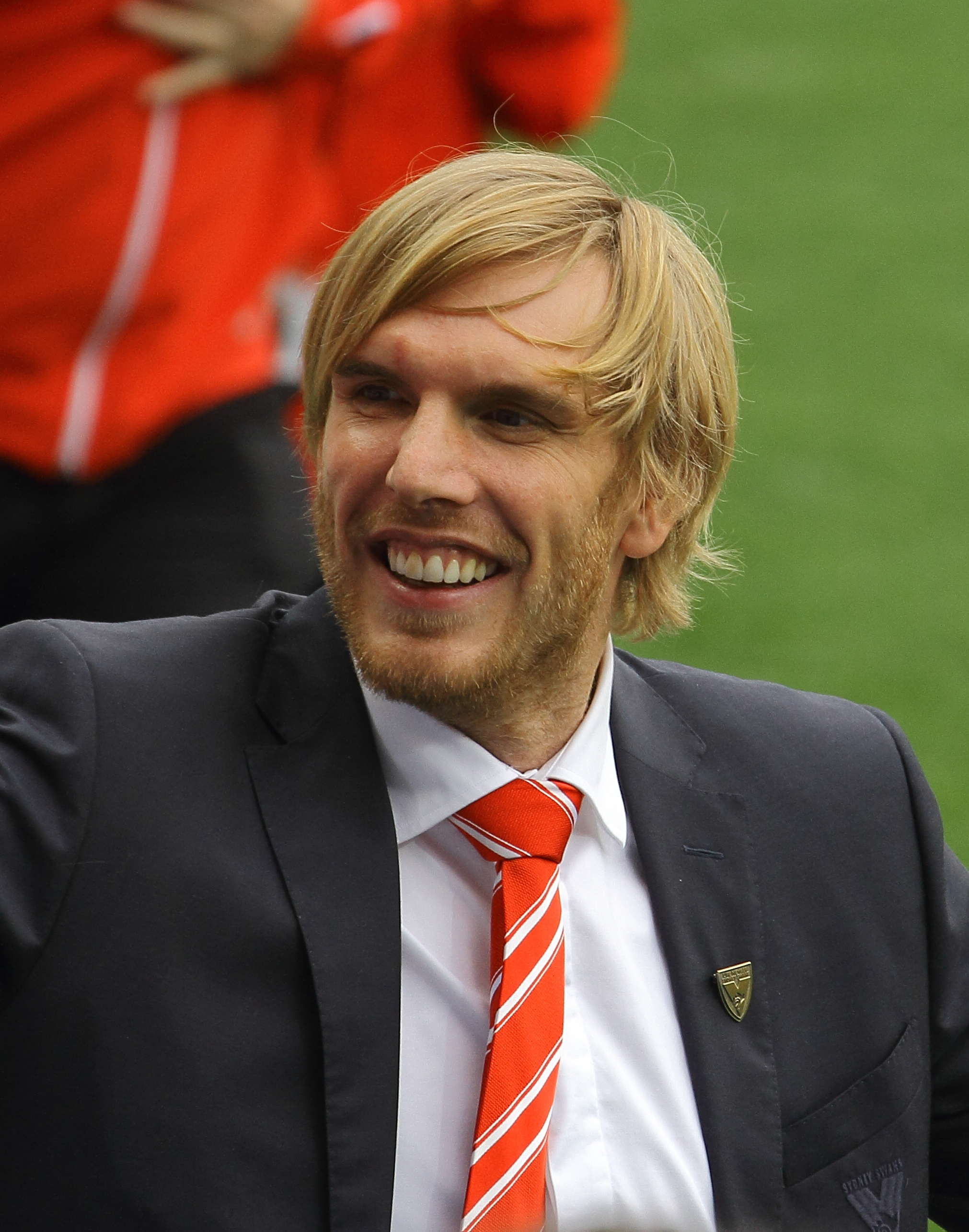
- Roberts-Thomson says farewell after announcing his retirement

Personal information
- Full name: Lewis Roberts-Thomson
- Nickname: L.R.T.
- Born: 8 September 1983 (age 43); Brisbane, Queensland
- Original team: NSW/ACT Rams (TAC Cup)/North Shore Bombers
- Draft: No. 29, 2001 National Draft
- Height: 194 cm (6 ft 4 in)
- Weight: 92 kg (203 lb)
- Position: Defender

Playing career^{1}
Years	Club	Games (Goals)
2003–2014	Sydney	179 (54)
- ^{1} Playing statistics correct to the end of 2014.

Career highlights
- 2x Premierships 2005, 2012; 2003 AFL Rising Star nominee

Lewis Roberts-Thomson (born 8 September 1983) is a former Australian Rules Football player, who played for the Sydney Swans in the Australian Football League. He has been colloquially known to fans and commentators as either "LRT" or the "Hyphenator".

== Early life ==
Roberts-Thomson was born in Brisbane, Queensland to a farming family from North-West Tasmania who moved to Sydney, New South Wales when he was a child. He grew up playing rugby union as a contemporary of Wallaby Phil Waugh at Sydney Church of England Grammar School.

At age 14, he was introduced to Australian rules football and quickly excelled. He played 40 Aussie rules matches up to 2001 mostly for the North Shore Bombers, although he had already been named in the 2001 under-18 All-Australian team.

Roberts-Thomson was drafted by the Swans from the NSW-ACT U18s with the 29th selection in the 2001 AFL draft.

== AFL career ==
After being injured for most of the 2002 season, he was awarded an AFL Rising Star nomination in his tenth game in 2003, after making his debut in Round 8. He was then injured again for most of the 2004 season with thumb and achilles injuries.

His performance as a key defender in 2005, including his performance in that year's Grand Final against the West Coast Eagles, secured a permanent position in the Swans' backline.

After an injury riddled 2008 season, Roberts-Thomson not only re-solidified his place at CHB in the Swans' defence in 2009, he improved vastly through the season playing on some of the best forwards in the AFL.

In 2010, Roberts-Thomson continued his strong form and with Craig Bolton suffering a serious Achilles tendon injury early in the year, he and Heath Grundy stepped up manfully to take on the brunt of the defensive work. He injured his hamstring about halfway through the year and was forced to sit out the rest of the season.

For Roberts-Thomson, 2011 was an up and down year as injury and the rapid improvement from Ted Richards and Alex Johnson didn't allow for him to take up his normal position as a tall defender. Consequently, he was used mostly as a 2nd ruckman and tall forward when in the senior side. Illness to Grundy allowed Roberts-Thomson to take up a position in the backline late in the year however, a role that he would fill well for the Swans' run into the finals.

In round 2 of the 2012 season, Roberts-Thomson reached life membership of the Swans in 2012 after playing his 150th game. He went on to play in the Swans' 2012 premiership side who were victorious over Hawthorn.

After managing only nine appearances across the 2013 and 2014 seasons, Roberts-Thomson retired from AFL football in August 2014.

== Statistics ==
Legend
G	Goals	K	Kicks	D	Disposals	T	Tackles
B	Behinds	H	Handballs	M	Marks

Season	Team	No.	Games	Totals							Averages (per game)						
Season	Team	No.	Games	G	B	K	H	D	M	T	G	B	K	H	D	M	T
2003	Sydney	30	16	5	4	46	44	90	29	12	0.3	0.3	2.9	2.8	5.6	1.8	0.8
2004	Sydney	30	7	0	1	12	22	34	7	4	0.0	0.1	1.7	3.1	4.9	1.0	0.6
2005	Sydney	30	25	0	3	95	103	198	58	37	0.0	0.1	3.8	4.1	7.9	2.3	1.5
2006	Sydney	30	24	3	1	129	116	245	87	30	0.1	0.0	5.4	4.8	10.2	3.6	1.3
2007	Sydney	30	2	0	0	14	15	29	13	3	0.0	0.0	7.0	7.5	14.5	6.5	1.5
2008	Sydney	30	24	4	1	152	134	286	108	48	0.2	0.0	6.3	5.6	11.9	4.5	2.0
2009	Sydney	30	21	2	0	175	156	331	144	28	0.1	0.0	8.3	7.4	15.8	6.9	1.3
2010	Sydney	30	14	0	2	114	80	194	87	34	0.0	0.1	8.1	5.7	13.9	6.2	2.4
2011	Sydney	30	15	12	5	71	44	115	42	39	0.8	0.3	4.7	2.9	7.7	2.8	2.6
2012	Sydney	30	22	25	10	125	98	223	76	47	1.1	0.5	5.7	4.5	10.1	3.5	2.1
2013	Sydney	30	4	1	1	22	14	36	7	6	0.3	0.3	5.5	3.5	9.0	1.8	1.5
2014	Sydney	30	5	2	1	21	12	33	13	9	0.4	0.2	4.2	2.4	6.6	2.6	1.8
Career			179	54	29	976	838	1814	671	297	0.3	0.2	5.5	4.7	10.1	3.7	1.7
