= Nick Malceski =

Australian rules footballer (born 1984)

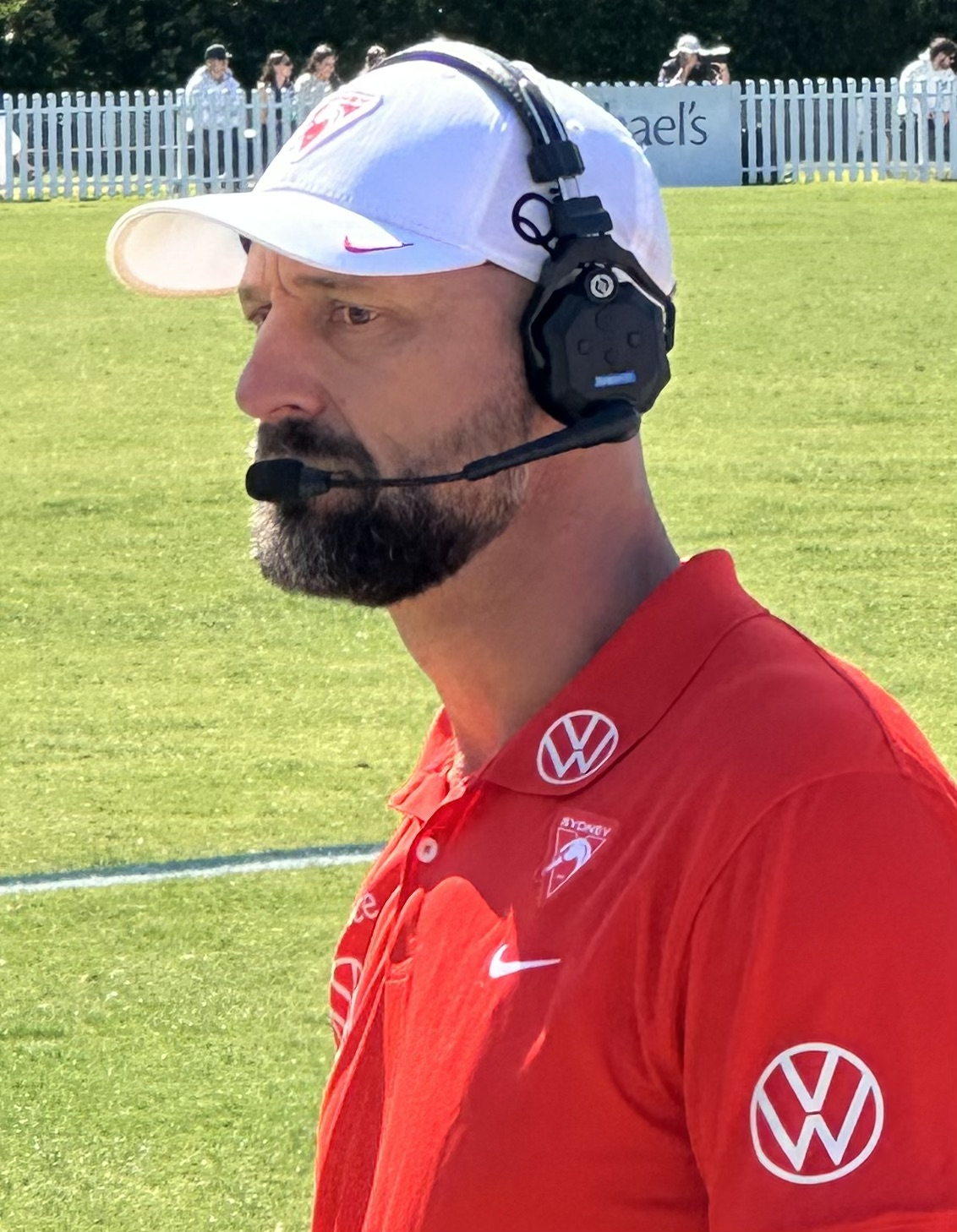
- Malceski in April 2026

Personal information
- Full name: Nick Malceski
- Born: 15 August 1984 (age 42); Melbourne, Victoria
- Original team: Eastern Ranges (TAC Cup)
- Draft: No. 64, 2002 national draft
- Height: 188 cm (6 ft 2 in)
- Weight: 85 kg (187 lb)
- Position: Defender

Playing career^{1}
Years	Club	Games (Goals)
2005–2014	Sydney	176 (67)
2015–2016	Gold Coast	34 (8)
Total		210 (75)
- ^{1} Playing statistics correct to the end of 2016.

Career highlights
- AFL premiership player: 2012; All-Australian: 2014; Brett Kirk Medal: 2013 (round 16)

Nick Malceski (born 15 August 1984) is a former professional Australian rules footballer who played for the Sydney Swans and Gold Coast Suns in the Australian Football League (AFL).

A running defender, Malceski was part of the Sydney line-up that won the 2012 AFL Grand Final, and in total played 176 games for the club between 2005 and 2014. He was named in the 2014 All-Australian team, but at the end of that season joined the Gold Coast, where he played two seasons (consisting of 34 games) before retiring at the end of the 2016 season.

== AFL career ==
=== Recruitment ===
Malceski is a Macedonian Australian. He was recruited from the Eastern Ranges by the Sydney Swans in the 2002 AFL draft with the 64th overall pick.

In his first year at the club, the talented midfielder played in the Wizard Home Loans Cup and then followed up with a full season for the Swans Reserves, where he impressed coaching staff with his magnificent disposal skills on both sides of his body and excellent decision-making abilities in both attack and defence. After a successful first season with the Swans Reserves, Malceski and coaching staff had high hopes for him making his debut for the seniors in the 2004 premiership season. Unfortunately, Malceski ruptured his left anterior cruciate ligament during a trial game, requiring him to have a knee reconstruction, thus ruining any hopes of him making a seniors debut in 2004.

=== Sydney (2005–2014) ===
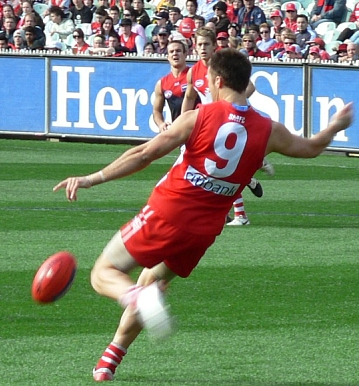
Malceski executing a drop punt for the Sydney Swans in 2006

In 2005, Malceski surprised everyone by fully recovering from his knee injury both physically and mentally, and was rewarded with a seniors debut against Carlton in round eleven, the week after the Swans had suffered a 43-point loss to St Kilda which placed the entire club under severe scrutiny. He scored his first career goal with his first kick. Malceski went on to play another four matches for the seniors, but eventually missed out on playing in the premiership side at the end of the season.

In 2006, Malceski got the call up to play for the seniors in round 3, along with a new guernsey, number 9. He played well and held his spot in the team, scoring five goals and averaged 14 possessions a game. However, Malceski pulled up with a hamstring injury during the first quarter of the Swans' round 9 clash against Hawthorn at the MCG. Scans later revealed he would miss the next 3 or 4 weeks.

In the Round 4, 2006 match against Melbourne, he had the opportunity to level the scores in the dying moments but missed from 25 metres out and the Demons hung on. This was an inapt way to cap off his game which was considered to have shown a lot of promise – with several long kicks and attacking flair shown. The match marked his arrival as a promising young player.

Malceski's form earned him selection in the 2006 AFL Grand Final where he garnered 10 possessions and kicked an important goal, however his side ultimately lost in his first Grand Final appearance to the West Coast Eagles.

In 2007, Malceski continued to impress with exquisite disposal skills and cemented his place in the Sydney Swans team with several stand-out performances early in the season. His speed and accuracy off half-back has made him an important cog in the Swans team. In Round 5, 2007 against the Melbourne Demons, Malceski was awarded best on ground with 28 disposals and 1 goal. A great season performance in 2007 resulted Malceski to be runner-up in the clubs prestigious Skilton Medal, only second to Sydney midfielder Brett Kirk.

After his break-out year in 2007, Malceski and Swans coaching staff had high hopes for an even more successful 2008. However, their hopes were delivered a cruel blow when Malceski suffered what appeared to be a serious knee injury to his right knee after he twisted it when changing direction during the 3rd quarter of the Swans Round 1, NAB Cup clash with Hawthorn in Tasmania. It was expected that the knee injury would rule Malceski out for the remainder of the season, however, a synthetic ligament was installed into the knee and he returned to the side in a game against Essendon mid-way through the season.

In 2010, after two years of disappointing form and recovery from his serious knee injury, Malceski returned to his best form. Returning to the half-back line, his run and precision kicking were great assets for the Swans as they pushed towards the finals. He capped off his year by placing 7th in the Bob Skilton Medal and being named in the initial 40 man All-Australian squad.

In the 2011 pre-season, Malceski re-tore his anterior cruciate ligament in his right knee. It was announced he would be having LARS surgery again and he would be out for 10–12 weeks.

Malceski was part of the Sydney Swans team which won the 2012 AFL Grand Final, where he kicked his side's first and last goals of the match through miraculous snap shots. Malceski's year was typified by his run and delivery off the half-back line while he has also sharpened his defensive skills dramatically to ensure he is not a weak link. He helped the Swans' defensive units become the stingiest and one of the toughest to score against in season 2012.

=== Gold Coast (2015–2016) ===
On 6 October 2014, Malceski signed a three-year deal with the Gold Coast Football Club, parting ways with Sydney after ten seasons. At the conclusion of the 2016 season, he announced his retirement from the AFL due to ongoing knee injuries.

== Statistics ==
Legend
G	Goals	K	Kicks	D	Disposals	T	Tackles
B	Behinds	H	Handballs	M	Marks

Led the league for the season only
Led the league after season and finals

Season	Team	No.	Games	Totals							Averages (per game)						
Season	Team	No.	Games	G	B	K	H	D	M	T	G	B	K	H	D	M	T
2005	Sydney	40	5	1	1	21	11	32	10	3	0.2	0.2	4.2	2.2	6.4	2.0	0.6
2006	Sydney	9	17	9	7	148	57	205	68	53	0.5	0.4	8.7	3.4	12.1	4.0	3.1
2007	Sydney	9	23	14	5	333	148	481	150	60	0.6	0.2	14.5	6.4	20.9	6.5	2.6
2008	Sydney	9	11	6	1	110	47	157	53	19	0.5	0.1	10.0	4.3	14.3	4.8	1.7
2009	Sydney	9	12	5	5	113	70	183	37	16	0.4	0.4	9.4	5.8	15.3	3.1	1.3
2010	Sydney	9	24	7	9	339	204	543	128	60	0.3	0.4	14.1	8.5	22.6	5.3	2.5
2011	Sydney	9	12	6	7	126	53	179	51	32	0.5	0.6	10.5	4.4	14.9	4.3	2.7
2012	Sydney	9	22	6	5	295	106	401	68	77	0.3	0.2	13.4	4.8	18.2	3.1	3.5
2013	Sydney	9	25	5	4	429	123	552	101	52	0.2	0.2	17.2	4.9	22.1	4.0	2.1
2014	Sydney	9	25	8	7	427	149	576	98	72	0.3	0.3	17.1	6.0	23.0	3.9	2.9
2015	Gold Coast	7	16	3	3	182	83	265	75	37	0.2	0.2	11.4	5.2	16.6	4.7	2.3
2016	Gold Coast	7	18	5	7	219	125	344	93	48	0.3	0.4	12.2	6.9	19.1	5.2	2.7
Career			210	75	61	2742	1176	3918	932	529	0.4	0.3	13.1	5.6	18.7	4.4	2.5
