= Lewis Jetta =

Australian rules footballer

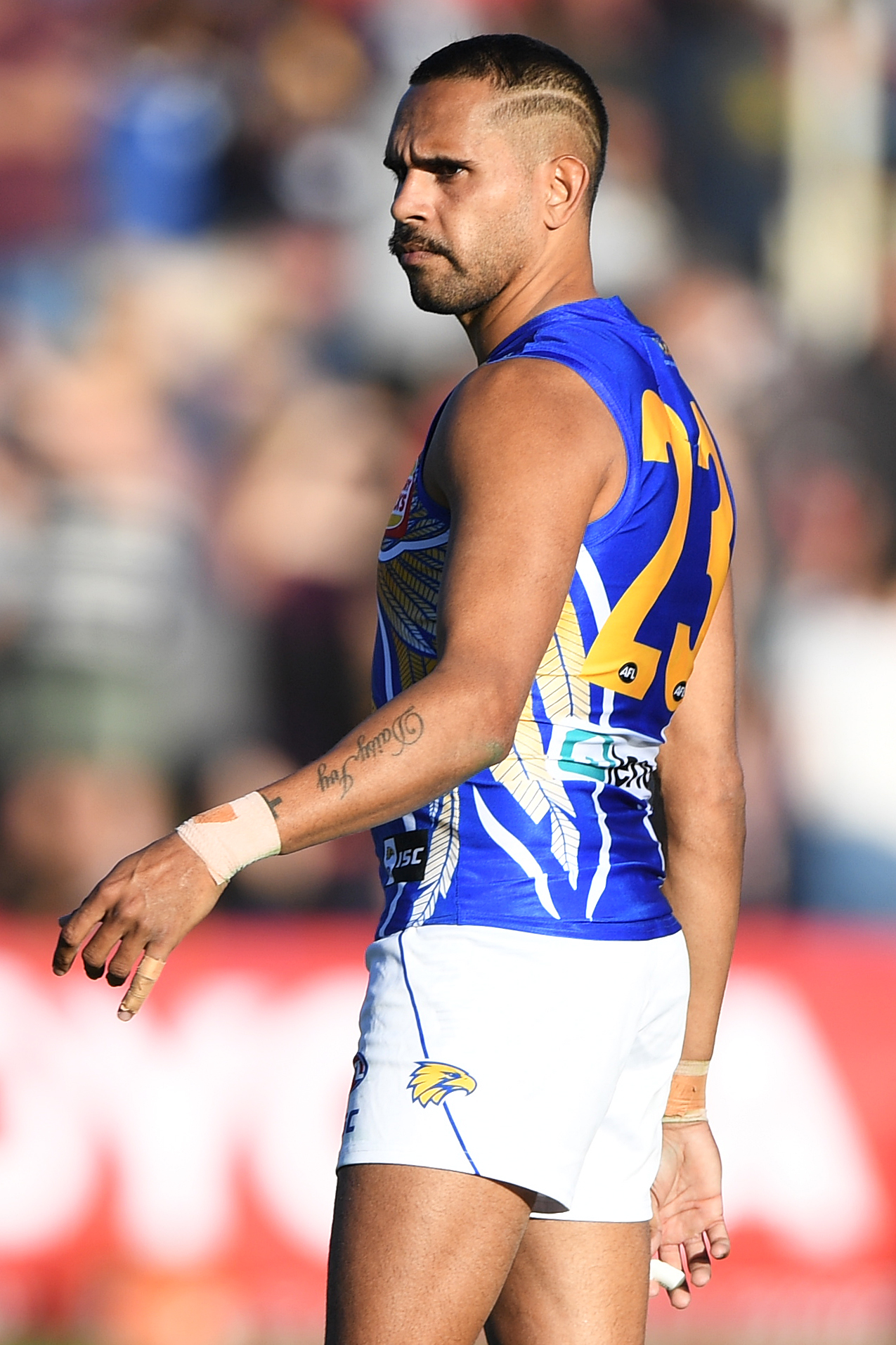
- Jetta playing for West Coast in July 2019

Personal information
- Full name: Lewis Jetta
- Born: 4 May 1989 (age 37); Bunbury, Western Australia
- Original team: Sydney Swans (AFL)
- Draft: 14th overall, 2009; Sydney Swans
- Height: 182 cm (6 ft 0 in)
- Weight: 80 kg (176 lb)
- Position: Half-forward/Half-back

Playing career^{1}
Years	Club	Games (Goals)
2010–2015	Sydney	127 (99)
2016–2020	West Coast	75 (17)
Total		202 (116)
- ^{1} Playing statistics correct to the end of 2020.

Career highlights
- 2× AFL premiership player: 2012, 2018; Sydney leading goalkicker: 2012; Chris Mainwaring Medal: 2018

Lewis Jetta (born 4 May 1989) is a former Australian rules footballer who played for the Sydney Swans and West Coast Eagles in the Australian Football League (AFL).

== Career ==
=== Early career ===
Jetta played his junior football with Carey Park Junior Football Club, a Bunbury side in the South West Football League (SWFL), before playing for Western Australian Football League (WAFL) club Swan Districts and was a part of the colts premiership in 2007.

He was overlooked in the 2007 AFL draft and decided to return to his hometown Bunbury to play for Bridgetown Football Club in the Lower South West Football League. After one season with Bridgetown Lewis returned to Swan Districts to play senior football in 2009.

=== AFL career ===
Jetta was drafted by Sydney with the 14th selection in the 2009 AFL draft, which had been traded from Collingwood in exchange for Darren Jolly.

Jetta is a small, but extremely quick and skilful player who was overlooked in both the 2007 and 2008 drafts, before having a breakthrough year for Swan Districts in 2009. He represented Western Australia in their state game against South Australia in June 2009 and kicked three goals, including the WA's last goal in the final minutes. He is the cousin of Neville Jetta who plays for Melbourne and his brother Graham Jetta plays for Swan Districts.

Jetta was impressive against Carlton in the opening round of the 2010 NAB Cup.

In 2010, Jetta's debut season, he scored 19 consecutive behinds without a goal. In round 19, against Hawthorn at the Sydney Cricket Ground, he kicked his first goal late in the game to break his streak and received a standing ovation from the crowd.

Jetta came third in the 2010 AFL Grand Final sprint, representing Sydney.

2011 was a relatively disappointing year for Jetta as he struggled to have an impact in several games. While he was able to have an influence at times throughout the year when he came on as the Swans' substitute, he often found it difficult to find the ball through 4 quarters of football. Although he suffered a disappointing 2011 season, he had an impressive lift of form in the 2012 season. The most notable improvements in his form are improved foot speed, kicking accuracy, and decision making. In 2011, Jetta only managed to kick 9 goals in the entirety of the season, yet by the end of round 16 of the 2012 season, he had kicked 36, making him first for goals in the Sydney squad and seventh in the competition itself. Jetta has improved immensely and has credited this to an outstanding pre-season.

On 8 June 2013 Jetta re-signed with the Sydney Swans for another two seasons.

In October 2015 Jetta was traded to the West Coast Eagles in exchange for Callum Sinclair.

Jetta was delisted at the conclusion of the 2020 AFL season.

== Personal life ==
Jetta and his ex partner Jessica Miller have a son together: Lewis Oliver Miller Jetta, born 26 December 2010. and a daughter, Daisy Ivy Miller Jetta, born 28 August 2013.

== Statistics ==
Statistics are correct to the end of round 7, 2019

Legend
G	Goals	K	Kicks	D	Disposals	T	Tackles
B	Behinds	H	Handballs	M	Marks

Season	Team	No.	Games	Totals							Averages (per game)						
Season	Team	No.	Games	G	B	K	H	D	M	T	G	B	K	H	D	M	T
2010	Sydney	32	20	7	21	181	86	267	75	36	0.4	1.1	9.1	4.3	13.4	3.8	1.8
2011	Sydney	32	20	9	12	132	56	188	45	50	0.5	0.6	6.6	2.8	9.4	2.3	2.5
2012†	Sydney	32	25	45	17	278	118	396	84	69	1.8	0.7	11.1	4.7	15.8	3.4	2.8
2013	Sydney	32	13	10	3	116	38	154	43	37	0.8	0.2	8.9	2.9	11.8	3.3	2.8
2014	Sydney	32	25	14	22	311	116	427	107	77	0.6	0.9	12.4	4.6	17.1	4.3	3.1
2015	Sydney	32	24	14	12	300	138	438	92	75	0.6	0.5	12.5	5.8	18.3	3.8	3.1
2016	West Coast	23	12	6	4	98	54	152	39	24	0.5	0.3	8.2	4.5	12.7	3.3	2.0
2017	West Coast	23	15	9	5	158	81	239	57	33	0.6	0.3	10.5	5.4	15.9	3.8	2.2
2018†	West Coast	23	20	1	1	227	101	328	91	32	0.1	0.1	11.4	5.1	16.4	4.6	1.6
2019	West Coast	23	6	0	0	77	25	102	29	6	0.0	0.0	12.8	4.2	17.0	4.8	1.0
Career			180	115	97	1878	813	2691	662	439	0.6	0.5	10.4	4.5	15.0	3.7	2.4
