= Jarrad McVeigh =

Australian rules footballer (born 1985)

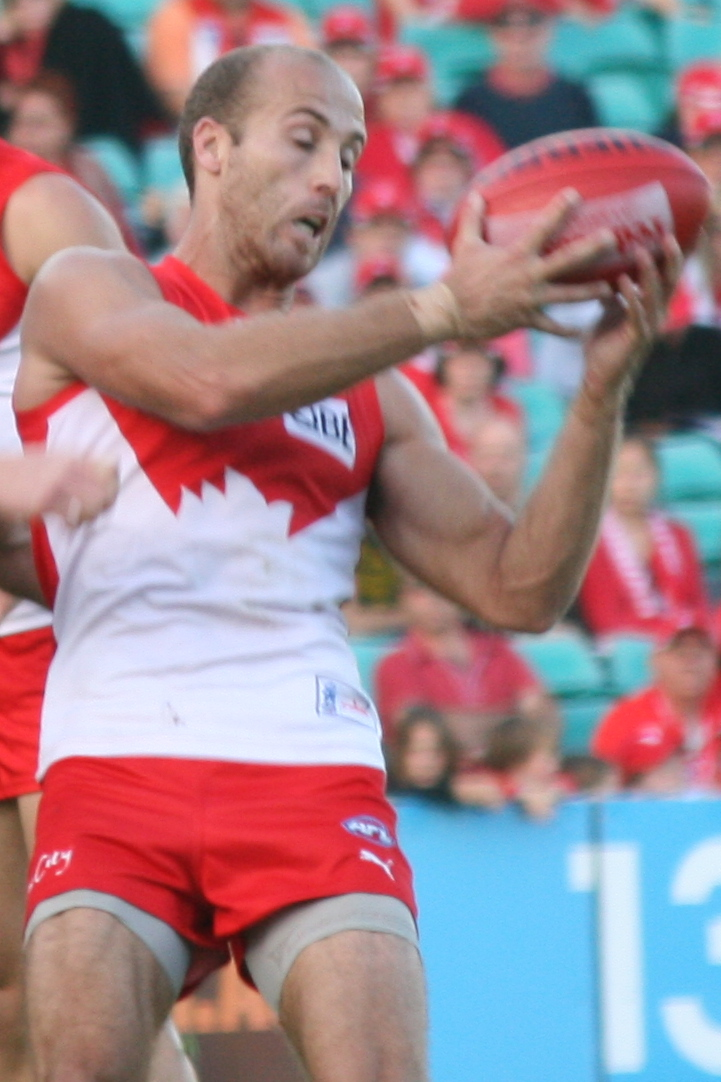
- McVeigh with Sydney in 2009

Personal information
- Full name: Jarrad McVeigh
- Born: 7 April 1985 (age 41); Central Coast (New South Wales)
- Original teams: NSW/ACT Rams (TAC Cup); Pennant Hills Demons
- Draft: No. 5, 2002 national draft
- Height: 184 cm (6 ft 0 in)
- Weight: 81 kg (179 lb)
- Position: Defender / Midfielder

Playing career^{1}
Years	Club	Games (Goals)
2003–2019	Sydney	325 (201)

International team honours^{2}
Years	Team	Games (Goals)
2010	Australia	2 (1)
- ^{1} Playing statistics correct to the end of 2019.^{2} Representative statistics correct as of 2010.

Career highlights
- AFL premiership captain: 2012; Sydney Captain 2011–2016; 2× Bob Skilton Medal: 2008, 2013; Carey-Bunton Medal (2011); All-Australian Team: 2013

Jarrad McVeigh (born 7 April 1985) is a former Australian rules footballer who played for the Sydney Swans in the Australian Football League (AFL). He is the younger brother of former Essendon midfielder Mark McVeigh. He was co-captain of the Sydney Swans alongside Adam Goodes in 2011 and 2012 and Kieren Jack from 2013 to 2016.

== Early life ==
McVeigh was born on the Central Coast in New South Wales to mother Margaret (a former Victorian basketball player) and father Tony (a former Williamstown Football Club player). Following their move from Melbourne to the Central Coast, Tony began coaching and captaining the Killarney Vale Bombers where Jarrad and his brother Mark would eventually play junior football.

Jarrad went from Killarney Vale to Pennant Hills AFC in the Sydney AFL competition before representing his state at junior level in the NSW/ACT Rams. In 2001 he was the joint winner of the McLean Medal for best player at the National AFL Under 16 Championships. He performed well at the AFL draft camp, recording the highest score in the beep test and the fastest three-kilometre run time. He was recruited by the Sydney Swans with the fifth selection in the 2002 AFL draft, which was plagued by the Carlton Football Club salary cap breach which saw the Swans advance up the order by two picks; without the punishments Carlton copped, McVeigh would've been drafted by the Brisbane Lions instead. In a 2024 interview, Paul Roos revealed that he chose to draft McVeigh over other prospects purely because he was from New South Wales, with McVeigh's New South Wales origins meaning that unlike drafting interstate players, the Swans would not need to worry about him seeking to leave the club to join a club closer to home.

== AFL career ==
=== Sydney (2004–2019) ===
McVeigh made his AFL debut, wearing guernsey number 3, in the Swans' loss to triple-defending premiers, the Brisbane Lions, at the Gabba in Round 1 of the 2004 season.

Earning the Swans Most Improved Award from the 2007 season, McVeigh established himself from a tagger to a goal-kicking midfielder. In round 18, 2008 against the Western Bulldogs, he kicked a career-high 6 goals.

At the end of the 2008 season, McVeigh won his first Bob Skilton Medal, as the Swans Best and Fairest, posting 578 votes, 10 points in front of runner-up Brett Kirk, polling the maximum 50 votes in the round-18 clash against the Western Bulldogs. In 2009, McVeigh had a less successful year, missing some games due to a hamstring injury, and finishing sixth in the Best and Fairest award.

In 2010, McVeigh finished fourth in the Bob Skilton Medal. He was selected on the International Rules squad for the tour to Ireland in October.

In 2011, McVeigh was appointed co-captain of the Sydney Swans alongside Adam Goodes. The death of his newborn daughter, Luella, marred his season. In his absence, the Swans defeated eventual premiers Geelong at Skilled Stadium (the first time a visiting side had won at that location in four years) in round 23 and dedicated the win to the McVeigh family and Luella. Despite such a tragedy, he managed to finish 10th in the 2011 Skilton Medal. In 2012, McVeigh captained the Sydney Swans to the 2012 premiership. His strong year was rewarded with a fifth-place finish in the 2012 Bob Skilton Medal. In 2015, McVeigh became only the seventh person to reach 250 games for the Swans in round 7.

On 1 August 2019, McVeigh announced that he would retire at the conclusion of the 2019 AFL season.

== Personal life ==
McVeigh is married to Clementine McVeigh. On 25 July 2011 they had their first child, Luella, who died barely a month later following serious heart complications.

In the first match since this tragedy, on 27 August 2011 the Swans caused one of the biggest upsets of the season, defeating Geelong at its home ground, where it had not lost in 1462 days; for Sydney, it was their first win at the venue for more than 12 years. Sydney and Geelong players wore black armbands in the match 'as a mark of respect for their absent co-captain Jarrad McVeigh and his wife Clementine'. The remarkable victory by the Swans was considered a tribute to McVeigh and his daughter.

Essendon's Mark McVeigh, the older brother of Jarrad who had a baby daughter himself earlier in the year, paid tribute to Luella by 'blowing a kiss to the heavens' following his team's seven-point win over Port Adelaide the following day. Essendon's players also wore black armbands in their match in respect to Mark's niece.

It was confirmed in February 2012 that Jarrad and his wife Clementine were expecting another baby. The McVeighs' second child was born on 8 July 2012. They had another daughter on 12 September 2017.

== Statistics ==
Legend
G	Goals	K	Kicks	D	Disposals	T	Tackles
B	Behinds	H	Handballs	M	Marks

Season	Team	No.	Games	Totals							Averages (per game)						
Season	Team	No.	Games	G	B	K	H	D	M	T	G	B	K	H	D	M	T
2004	Sydney	3	20	6	7	85	60	145	32	26	0.3	0.4	4.3	3.0	7.3	1.6	1.3
2005	Sydney	3	13	4	6	66	54	120	34	28	0.3	0.5	5.1	4.2	9.2	2.6	2.2
2006	Sydney	3	25	21	7	173	79	252	82	71	0.8	0.3	6.9	3.2	10.1	3.3	2.8
2007	Sydney	3	23	11	15	212	106	318	105	52	0.5	0.7	9.2	4.6	13.8	4.6	2.3
2008	Sydney	3	24	32	14	251	216	467	114	75	1.3	0.6	10.5	9.0	19.5	4.8	3.1
2009	Sydney	3	18	14	10	189	190	379	69	56	0.8	0.6	10.5	10.6	21.1	3.8	3.1
2010	Sydney	3	24	16	11	277	240	517	91	85	0.7	0.5	11.5	10.0	21.5	3.8	3.5
2011	Sydney	3	22	19	11	297	173	470	81	97	0.9	0.5	13.5	7.9	21.4	3.7	4.4
2012	Sydney	3	25	18	13	352	264	616	108	80	0.7	0.5	14.1	10.6	24.6	4.3	3.2
2013	Sydney	3	25	16	7	404	284	688	102	88	0.6	0.3	16.2	11.4	27.5	4.1	3.5
2014	Sydney	3	25	15	9	327	255	582	105	110	0.6	0.4	13.1	10.2	23.3	4.2	4.4
2015	Sydney	3	22	12	5	290	243	533	121	99	0.5	0.2	13.2	11.0	24.2	5.5	4.5
2016	Sydney	3	21	8	6	249	178	427	70	78	0.4	0.3	11.9	8.5	20.3	3.3	3.7
2017	Sydney	3	13	7	6	147	94	241	64	29	0.5	0.5	11.3	7.2	18.5	4.9	2.2
2018	Sydney	3	19	1	0	235	166	401	92	42	0.1	0.0	12.4	8.7	21.1	4.8	2.2
2019	Sydney	3	6	1	0	57	51	108	24	7	0.2	0.0	9.5	8.5	18.0	4.0	1.2
Career			325	201	127	3611	2653	6264	1294	1023	0.6	0.4	11.1	8.2	19.3	4.0	3.1
