= Kieren Jack =

Australian rules footballer

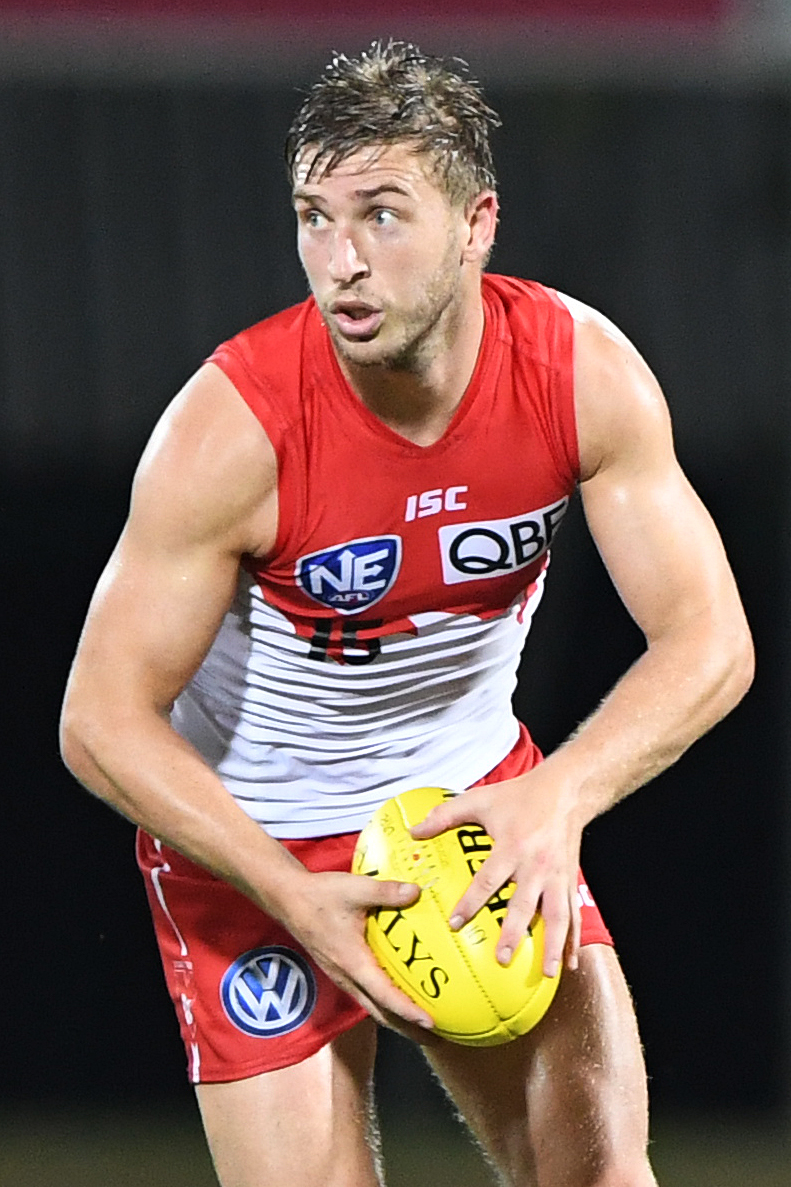
- Jack playing for Sydney in July 2019

Personal information
- Full name: Kieren Jack
- Born: 28 June 1987 (age 39); Sydney, New South Wales
- Original team: NSW/ACT Rams (TAC Cup)
- Height: 178 cm (5 ft 10 in)
- Weight: 81 kg (179 lb)
- Position: Midfielder

Playing career^{1}
Years	Club	Games (Goals)
2007–2019	Sydney	256 (166)

International team honours
Years	Team	Games (Goals)
2010	Australia	2 (0)
- ^{1} Playing statistics correct to the end of 2019.

Career highlights
- AFL premiership player: 2012; Sydney Swans captain: 2013–2016; Bob Skilton Medal: 2010; All-Australian team: 2013; 2008 AFL Rising Star: nominee; 3 × Brett Kirk Medal: 2012, 2013, 2014; 2 x Carey-Bunton Medal (2012, 2013)

Kieren Jack (born 28 June 1987) is a former Australian rules footballer who played for the Sydney Swans in the Australian Football League (AFL). He was the co-captain of the Sydney Swans, alongside Jarrad McVeigh from 2013 to 2016.

== Early life ==
Jack was born in Sydney, New South Wales. The son of former Balmain, NSW and Australian rugby league player Garry Jack, Kieren is the eldest of three brothers raised in the Cherrybrook suburb of Sydney. His younger brothers are Rhys and Brandon.

Kieren was educated at West Pennant Hills Primary School where he played in its AFL team, including the premiership side in 1999.

His first experience of Australian rules was in the Paul Kelly Cup in 1998 in primary school playing for the junior Pennant Hills Demons AFC. He went on to play a key part in premierships with the junior Demons in 1999 and 2000. He played both rugby league (Carlingford Cougars) and Australian rules until 2000 before breaking the news to his father that he wanted to stop playing league to focus on Australian Rules. He was identified by AFL talent scouts and taken by Sydney in the 2005 Rookie draft from the NSW/ACT Rams Under 18 team.

== AFL career ==
Before even making his debut, Kieren made news in 2007 as one of four players allegedly involved in an AFL betting scandal, though many criticised the AFL's decision to identify him, as his was only a $5 bet. He was later promoted from the rookie list. Notable for his tackling and running abilities, he plays as a midfielder for the Swans. In Round 4, 2008, he gained a NAB AFL Rising Star nomination for his role on West Coast Eagles onballer Daniel Kerr in a match the Swans won by 62 points (their biggest win over the Eagles since 2000).

His career year was capped off with taking home the Bob Skilton Medal as the Swans' best and fairest player over Shane Mumford and Josh Kennedy. After a breakthrough season in 2010, Jack struggled through much of 2011 with an ankle injury. He missed 6 games due to injury and was for the most part unable to recapture his form and impact from 2010. He played his 100th AFL game for the Sydney Swans against Essendon in Round 11, 2012. He finished 4th in the 2012 Bob Skilton Medal a week after kicking 2 crucial goals in the Swans' Grand Final victory at the MCG over the Hawthorn Hawks.

In 2013, Jack was named co-captain of the Sydney Swans, alongside 2012 Premiership Captain, Jarrad McVeigh. This decision was made after previous co-captain Adam Goodes announced he was stepping down from the position.

On 19 August 2019, Jack announced that he would retire at the end of the 2019 AFL season.

== Personal life ==
Kieren Jack is married to television journalist and presenter Charlotte Goodlet.

In July 2016, it was reported Jack had a falling out with his parents and that he did not invite his parents to his 200th AFL game. Former Swan and radio personality Ryan Fitzgerald criticized Garry Jack and his wife for airing the feud publicly on Twitter.

== Statistics ==
Statistics are correct to the end of the 2016 season

Legend
G	Goals	K	Kicks	D	Disposals	T	Tackles
B	Behinds	H	Handballs	M	Marks

Season	Team	No.	Games	Totals							Averages (per game)						
Season	Team	No.	Games	G	B	K	H	D	M	T	G	B	K	H	D	M	T
2007	Sydney	48	2	0	0	8	10	18	4	4	0.0	0.0	4.0	5.0	9.0	2.0	2.0
2008	Sydney	15	23	11	9	171	113	284	69	91	0.5	0.4	7.4	4.9	12.3	3.0	4.0
2009	Sydney	15	22	13	10	174	149	323	55	85	0.6	0.5	7.9	6.8	14.7	2.5	3.9
2010	Sydney	15	24	21	15	307	181	488	68	147	0.9	0.6	12.8	7.5	20.3	2.8	6.1
2011	Sydney	15	18	6	7	228	115	343	36	96	0.3	0.4	12.7	6.4	19.1	2.0	5.3
2012	Sydney	15	25	27	13	359	242	601	65	140	1.1	0.5	14.4	9.7	24.0	2.6	5.6
2013	Sydney	15	25	24	14	350	281	631	53	159	1.0	0.6	14.0	11.2	25.2	2.1	6.4
2014	Sydney	15	24	18	13	323	249	572	82	131	0.8	0.6	13.5	10.4	23.9	3.4	5.5
2015	Sydney	15	22	11	7	243	265	508	87	132	0.5	0.3	11.0	12.0	23.1	4.0	6.0
2016	Sydney	15	25	13	13	310	254	564	83	145	0.5	0.5	12.4	10.2	22.6	3.3	5.8
Career			210	144	101	2473	1859	4332	602	1130	0.7	0.5	11.8	8.9	20.6	2.9	5.4
