= Xavier Ellis =

Australian rules footballer and media personality

Personal information
- Full name: Xavier John Ellis
- Born: 28 February 1988 (age 38)
- Original team: Gippsland Power (TAC Cup)
- Draft: No. 3 (PP), 2005 national draft
- Debut: Round 1, 2007, Hawthorn vs. Brisbane Lions, at The Gabba
- Height: 187 cm (6 ft 2 in)
- Weight: 81 kg (179 lb)
- Position: Midfielder

Playing career^{1}
Years	Club	Games (Goals)
2006–2013	Hawthorn	86 (28)
2014–2016	West Coast	34 (9)
Total		120 (37)
- ^{1} Playing statistics correct to the end of 2016.

Career highlights
- AFL premiership player: 2008

Xavier John Ellis (born 28 February 1988) is a media personality and former professional Australian rules football player who played with the Hawthorn Football Club and West Coast Eagles in the Australian Football League. Over 125 senior matches and two AFL Clubs, he played in three grand finals (2008, 2012 and 2015), winning in 2008.

== AFL career ==
Ellis was drafted by the Hawthorn Football Club with their first selection and third overall in the 2005 national draft. In 2006, he focused on completing his year twelve studies and playing football for Melbourne Grammar, where he was co-captain of the 1st XVIII. His season was wrecked by injuries, but he managed to play several games for Hawthorn's VFL affiliate, the Box Hill Hawks.

He made his senior debut against the Brisbane Lions in round one, 2007 and scored his first goal in round four against Geelong at Aurora Stadium. His debut season saw him rewarded with the club's best first year player.

During the 2008 season, he played 23 matches, averaging 20 disposals. Xavier played in the 2008 AFL Grand Final, where he amassed 28 disposals (the most for Hawthorn) and helped his team defeat Geelong. This would be his first and only Premiership as a player but he would go onto play in two more grand finals.

From 2009 to 2012, he was hampered by a string of injuries throughout this period. He missed most of the 2012 season, only managing to play five matches, including the 2012 grand final loss. This would Xavier's second Grand Final appearance and first loss as a player.

In 2013, he was restricted to just two games after numerous calf injuries and at the end of the season he signed with the West Coast as an unrestricted free agent. This would be the same time former Hawthorn Football Club Assistant Coach Adam Simpson would become West Coast Eagles Head Coach.

From 2014 to 2015, he played the majority of both seasons including the 2015 AFL Grand Final against his old side, Hawthorn. This would Xavier's third grand final appearance and second loss as a player.

After managing just two matches in the 2016 season, Ellis announced his immediate retirement from the AFL in August via a post on Instagram.

== Media ==
In February 2017, Ellis was announced as co-host of Weekend Breakfast on Hit 92.9 with Heidi Anderson.

In January 2018, Ellis was announced at co-host of Heidi, Xavier and Ryan, Hit 92.9's Weekday breakfast program with Heidi Anderson and Ryan Jon.

Throughout the 2018 WAFL season Xavier was seen on the Channel Seven television coverage. The following year, Ellis would replace Peter Bell for Channel Seven's coverage of AFL matches in Perth. His role has been primarily as a boundary rider and to conduct interviews during the quarter breaks.

Ellis is currently the co-host of the 'Moreira's Magic' AFL Fantasy podcast with Selby-Lee Steere.

== Statistics ==
Legend
G	Goals	K	Kicks	D	Disposals	T	Tackles
B	Behinds	H	Handballs	M	Marks

Season	Team	No.	Games	Totals							Averages (per game)							Votes
Season	Team	No.	Games	G	B	K	H	D	M	T	G	B	K	H	D	M	T	Votes
2006	Hawthorn	32	0	—	—	—	—	—	—	—	—	—	—	—	—	—	—	0
2007	Hawthorn	32	13	3	2	78	74	152	49	24	0.2	0.2	6.0	5.7	11.7	3.8	1.8	0
2008^{#}	Hawthorn	8	23	3	1	205	250	455	151	53	0.1	0.0	8.9	10.9	19.8	6.6	2.3	1
2009	Hawthorn	8	11	3	0	87	105	192	47	35	0.3	0.0	7.9	9.5	17.5	4.3	3.2	0
2010	Hawthorn	8	23	10	7	207	193	400	106	89	0.4	0.3	9.0	8.4	17.4	4.6	3.9	0
2011	Hawthorn	8	8	3	1	84	64	148	46	19	0.4	0.1	10.5	8.0	18.5	5.8	2.4	0
2012	Hawthorn	8	6	6	0	44	35	79	14	8	1.0	0.0	7.3	5.8	13.2	2.3	1.3	0
2013	Hawthorn	8	2	0	2	9	3	12	3	4	0.0	1.0	4.5	1.5	6.0	1.5	2.0	0
2014	West Coast	18	17	7	2	174	84	258	53	40	0.4	0.1	10.2	4.9	15.2	3.1	2.4	0
2015	West Coast	18	15	1	0	164	62	226	76	22	0.1	0.0	10.9	4.2	15.1	5.1	1.5	0
2016	West Coast	18	2	1	0	11	11	22	6	4	0.5	0.0	5.5	5.5	11.0	3.0	2.0	0
Career:			120	37	15	1063	881	1944	551	298	0.3	0.1	8.9	7.3	16.2	4.6	2.5	1

== Honours and achievements ==
Team

- AFL premiership player (Hawthorn): 2008
- 2× Minor premiership (Hawthorn): 2012, 2013

Individual

- Under 18 All-Australian team: 2005
