= Simon Meredith (umpire) =

Australian rules football field umpire

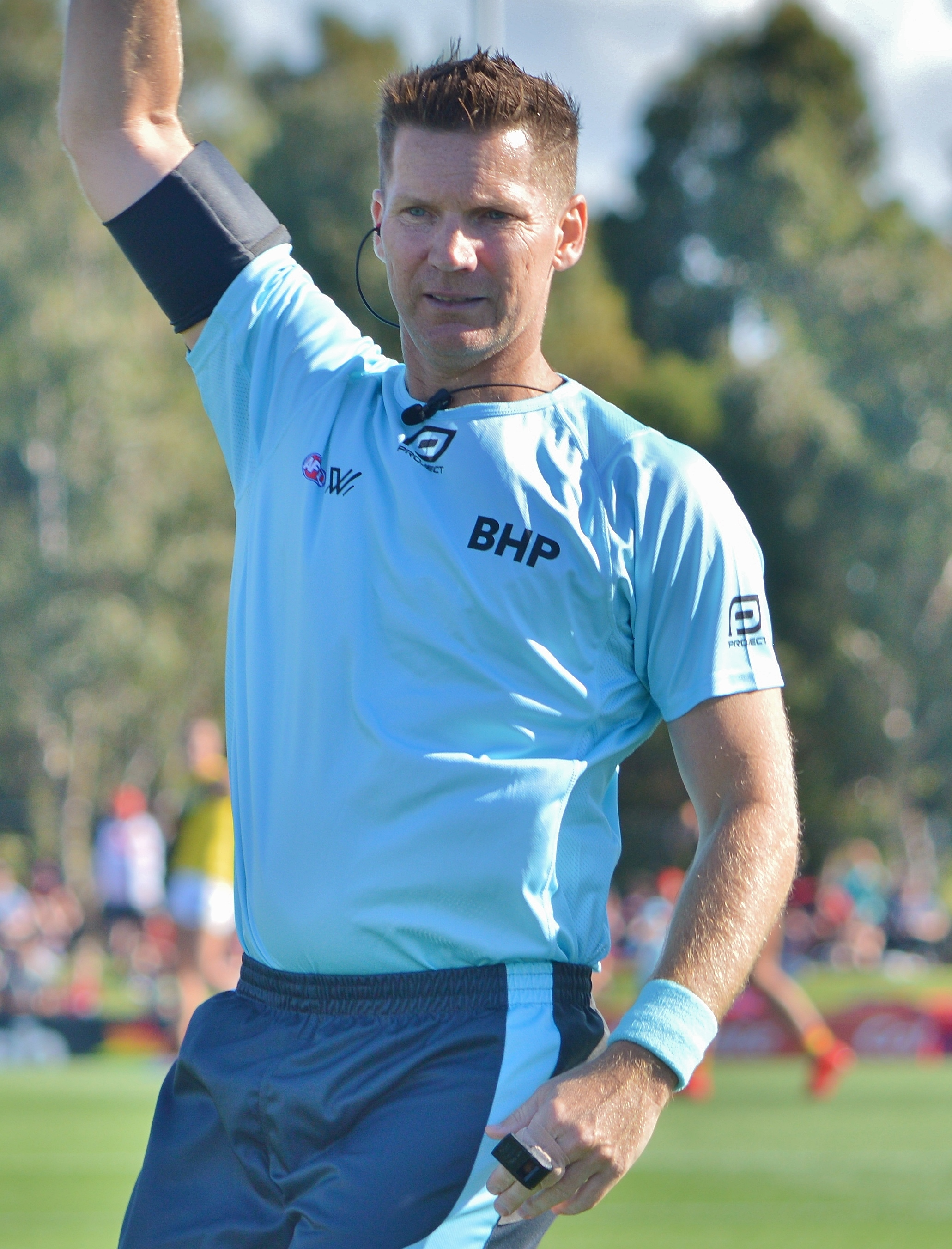
- Meredith umpiring an AFLW match in February 2021

Personal information
- Full name: Simon Meredith
- Born: 11 March 1975 (age 51)

Umpiring career
Years	League	Role	Games
2004–present	AFL	Field umpire	550

Simon Meredith (born 11 March 1975) is an Australian rules football field umpire in the Australian Football League. One of the league's most experienced umpires, he has officiated in ten AFL Grand Finals: 2012, 2013, 2014, 2016, 2017, 2020,2022, 2023, 2024 and 2025.

In June 2014, Meredith suffered severe headaches whilst umpiring a game between Sydney and Port Adelaide. He was taken to hospital and diagnosed with a subarachnoid hemorrhage. He spent over a week in hospital before returning to Melbourne. He recovered fully and went on to umpire in that season's grand final.

In 2017, Meredith received AFL life membership after umpiring 300 games, becoming the 22nd umpire to do so. Meredith officiated his 500th match when Sydney played Hawthorn during Round OR of the 2025 season. He became the 3rd umpire in VFL/AFL history to achieve this feat.
