= List of Sydney Swans leading goalkickers =

The following is a list of Sydney Swans (formerly South Melbourne Football Club) leading goalkickers in each season of the Australian Football League (formerly the Victorian Football League).

== VFL/AFL ==
^	Denotes current player

Season	Leading goalkicker	Goals
1897	Dinny McKay	14
1898	Charlie Colgan	13
1899	Charlie Colgan (2)	27
1900	Harry Lampe	16
1901	Harry Lampe (2)	20
1902	Charlie Goding	19
1903	Charlie Goding (2)	10
1904	Charles Clements	37
1905	Charles Clements (2)	31
1906	Len Mortimer	24
1907	Len Mortimer (2)	37
1908	Len Mortimer (3)	40
1909	Len Mortimer (4)	50
1910	Len Mortimer (5)	28
1911	Len Mortimer (6)	44
1912	Len Mortimer (7)	40
1913	Bill Strang	29
1914	Jack Freeman	36
1915	Harry Morgan	35
1917	Harry Morgan (2)	23
1918	Gerald P. Ryan	32
1919	Harold Robertson	38
1920	Stan Wootton	28
1921	Roy Cazaly	19
1922	Roy Cazaly (2)	28
1923	Ted Johnson	40
1924	Ted Johnson (2)	60
1925	Ted Johnson (3)	60
1926	Ted Johnson (4)	45
1927	Ted Johnson (5)	50
1928	Ted Johnson (6)	60
1929	Austin Robertson, Sr.	53
1930	Austin Robertson, Sr. (2)	54
1931	Austin Robertson, Sr. (3)	38
1932	Bob Pratt	71
1933	Bob Pratt (2)	109
1934	Bob Pratt (3)	150
1935	Bob Pratt (4)	103
1936	Bob Pratt (5)	64
1937	Laurie Nash	37
1938	Roy Moore	34
1939	Bob Pratt (6)	72
1940	Lou Reiffel	33
1941	Jack Graham	33
1942	Lindsay White	80
1943	Charlie Culph	35
1944	Ron Hartridge	31
1945	Laurie Nash (2)	56
1946	Harry Mears	32
1947	Bill Williams	97
1948	Jack Graham (2)	33
1949	Dick Jones	27
1950	Gordon Lane	47
1951	Bill Williams (2)	41
1952	Gordon Lane (2)	52
1953	Ian Gillett	34
1954	Eddie Lane	28
1955	Eddie Lane (2)	36
1956	Bill Gunn	28
1957	Fred Goldsmith	43
1958	Max Oaten	34
1959	Bob Skilton	60
1960	Max Oaten (2)	39
1961	Brian McGowan	38
1962	Bob Skilton (2)	36
1963	Bob Skilton (3)	36
1964	Max Papley	25
1965	Bob Kingston	48
1966	Austin Robertson, Jr.	60
1967	John Sudholz	35
1968	John Sudholz (2)	36
1969	John Sudholz (3)	35
1970	John Sudholz (4)	60
1971	Peter Bedford	44
1972	Peter Bedford (2)	28
1973	Peter Bedford (3)	52
1974	Norm Goss, Jr.	37
1975	Graham Teasdale	38
1976	Robert Dean	37
1977	Graham Teasdale (2)	38
1978	John Murphy	31
1979	Tony Morwood	56
1980	John Roberts	67
1981	John Roberts (2)	51
1982	Tony Morwood (2)	45
1983	Craig Braddy	48
1984	Warwick Capper	39
1985	Warwick Capper (2)	45
1986	Warwick Capper (3)	92
1987	Warwick Capper (4)	103
1988	Barry Mitchell	35
1989	Bernard Toohey	27
1990	Jim West	34
1991	Jason Love	52
1992	Simon Minton-Connell	60
1993	Simon Minton-Connell (2)	41
1994	Simon Minton-Connell (3)	68
1995	Tony Lockett	110
1996	Tony Lockett (2)	121
1997	Tony Lockett (3)	34
1998	Tony Lockett (4)	109
1999	Tony Lockett (5)	82
2000	Michael O'Loughlin	53
2001	Michael O'Loughlin (2)	35
2002	Barry Hall	55
2003	Barry Hall (2)	64
2004	Barry Hall (3)	74
2005	Barry Hall (4)	80
2006	Barry Hall (5)	78
2007	Barry Hall (6)	44
2008	Barry Hall (7)	41
2009	Adam Goodes	38
2010	Adam Goodes (2)	44
2011	Adam Goodes (3)	41
2012	Lewis Jetta	45
2013	Kurt Tippett	35
2014	Lance Franklin	79
2015	Lance Franklin (2)	47
2016	Lance Franklin (3)	81
2017	Lance Franklin (4)	73
2018	Lance Franklin (5)	57
2019	Tom Papley^	37
2020	Tom Papley^ (2)	26
2021	Lance Franklin (6)	51
2022	Lance Franklin (7)	52
2023	Tom Papley^ (3)	37
2024	Joel Amartey^	43
2025	Isaac Heeney^	37
2026	Charlie Curnow^	75

== AFL Women's ==
^	Denotes current player

Season	Player	Total
2022 (S7)	Brooke Lochland	7
2023	Chloe Molloy^	18
2024	Rebecca Privitelli^	12
2025	Chloe Molloy^ (2)	19

== Multiple winners ==
Wins	Player	Seasons
7	Len Mortimer	1906, 1907, 1908, 1909, 1910, 1911, 1912
7	Barry Hall	2002, 2003, 2004, 2005, 2006, 2007, 2008
7	Lance Franklin	2014, 2015, 2016, 2017, 2018, 2021, 2022
6	Ted Johnson	1923, 1924, 1925, 1926, 1927, 1928
6	Bob Pratt	1932, 1933, 1934, 1935, 1936, 1939
5	Tony Lockett	1995, 1996, 1997, 1998, 1999
4	John Sudholz	1967, 1968, 1969, 1970
4	Warwick Capper	1984, 1985, 1986, 1987
