= 2015 Sydney Swans season =

Sydney Swans
2015 season
- President: Andrew Pridham
- Coach: John Longmire (5th season)
- Captains: Kieren Jack (3rd season); Jarrad McVeigh (5th season)
- Home ground: SCG; ANZ Stadium
- AFL season: 4th (16-6)
- Finals: 5th
- Bob Skilton Medal: Josh Kennedy
- Leading goalkicker: Lance Franklin (47)
- Highest home attendance: 38,690 vs Adelaide (Round 18)
- Lowest home attendance: 23,274 vs Essendon (Round 1)
- Average home attendance: 31,491 (▼7,221)
- Club membership: 48,836 (▲8,710)

The 2015 AFL season was the 119th season in the Australian Football League contested by the Sydney Swans.

== Squad for 2015 ==
Statistics are correct as of end of 2014 season. Flags represent the state of origin, i.e. the state in which the player played his Under-18s football.

Senior List
No.	State	Player	Hgt (cm)	Wgt (kg)	Date of birth	Age (end 2014)	AFL Debut	Recruited from	Games (end 2014)	Goals (end 2014)
1	(South Australia)	James Rose	185	79	16 April 1996	18		Sturt
2	(Victoria (state))	Rhyce Shaw (lg)	182	81	16 October 1981	33	2000	Preston (U18), Collingwood	213	43
3	(New South Wales)	Jarrad McVeigh (c)	184	82	7 April 1985	29	2004	NSW/ACT (U18)	244	172
4	(Victoria (state))	Dan Hannebery	181	81	24 February 1991	23	2009	Oakleigh (U18)	120	54
5	(New South Wales)	Isaac Heeney	184	80	5 May 1996	18		Cardiff, Sydney Swans Academy
6	(Western Australia)	Tom Mitchell	181	84	31 May 1993	21	2013	Claremont	20	13
7	(New South Wales)	Harry Cunningham	181	78	6 December 1993	21	2012	NSW/ACT (U18)	31	19
8	(Queensland)	Kurt Tippett	201	105	8 May 1987	27	2008	Southport, Adelaide	130	257
9	(New South Wales)	Abaina Davis	192	97	27 January 1996	18		UNSW-Eastern Suburbs, Sydney Swans Academy
10	(Victoria (state))	Zak Jones	181	75	15 March 1995	19	2014	Dandenong (U18)	4	1
11	(Victoria (state))	Jeremy Laidler	190	89	5 August 1989	25	2009	Calder (U18), Geelong, Carlton	45	3
12	(Victoria (state))	Josh Kennedy (lg)	188	96	20 June 1988	26	2008	Sandringham (U18), Hawthorn	134	80
13	(Tasmania)	Toby Nankervis	199	101	12 August 1994	20		North Launceston
14	(New South Wales)	Craig Bird	179	83	21 January 1989	25	2008	NSW/ACT (U18)	131	53
15	(New South Wales)	Kieren Jack (c)	178	81	28 June 1987	27	2007	NSW/ACT (U18)	163	120
16	(Victoria (state))	Gary Rohan	189	88	7 June 1991	23	2010	Geelong (U18)	43	29
17	(New South Wales)	Jack Hiscox	184	74	23 March 1995	19		Sydney Uni, Sydney Swans Academy
19	(Western Australia)	Tom Derickx	204	96	7 December 1987	27	2012	Claremont, Richmond	14	5
20	(Victoria (state))	Sam Reid	196	95	27 December 1991	23	2010	Murray (U18)	76	78
21	(Victoria (state))	Ben McGlynn	172	76	6 August 1985	29	2006	Bendigo (U18), Hawthorn	144	165
22	(Victoria (state))	Dean Towers	189	87	4 May 1990	24	2014	North Ballarat	6	3
23	(Western Australia)	Lance Franklin	198	102	30 January 1987	28	2005	Perth, Hawthorn	204	659
24	(New South Wales)	Dane Rampe	188	88	2 June 1990	24	2013	UNSW-Eastern	48	4
25	(Victoria (state))	Ted Richards	192	94	11 January 1983	31	2002	Sandringham (U18), Essendon	231	32
26	(Victoria (state))	Luke Parker (lg)	184	85	25 October 1992	22	2011	Dandenong (U18)	82	60
27	(New South Wales)	Daniel Robinson	184	80	3 July 1994	20		Mosman Football Club
29	(South Australia)	George Hewett	185	77	29 December 1995	19		North Adelaide
31	(Western Australia)	Harry Marsh	188	82	13 January 1994	20		East Fremantle
32	(Western Australia)	Lewis Jetta	181	75	4 May 1989	25	2010	Swan Districts Football Club	103	85
33	(New South Wales)	Brandon Jack	182	80	25 May 1994	20	2013	Pennant Hills	17	10
34	(Victoria (state))	Alex Johnson	193	91	2 March 1992	22	2011	Oakleigh (U18)	45	1
36	(Western Australia)	Aliir Aliir	194	91	5 September 1994	20		East Fremantle
37	(Victoria (state))	Adam Goodes (lg)	191	100	8 January 1980	34	1999	North Ballarat (U18)	351	439
38	(Canada)	Mike Pyke	201	104	24 March 1984	30	2009	Canada Maple Leafs	90	44
39	(South Australia)	Heath Grundy	192	101	2 June 1986	28	2006	Norwood	164	23
40	(Victoria (state))	Nick Smith (lg)	183	82	12 June 1988	26	2008	Oakleigh (U18)	121	9
42	(Victoria (state))	Xavier Richards	196	93	25 April 1993	21	2013	Sandringham (U18)	1	0
44	(Victoria (state))	Jake Lloyd	180	77	20 September 1993	21	2014	North Ballarat (U18)	21	8
Rookie List
No.	State	Player	Hgt	Wgt	Date of birth	Age	Debut	Recruited from	Games	Goals
28	(Victoria (state))	Nic Newman	188	81	15 January 1993	21		Frankston
30	(Victoria (state))	Sean McLaren	198	93	10 January 1996	18		Sandringham
35	(New South Wales)	Sam Naismith	205	104	16 July 1992	22	2014	North Shore Australian Football Club	1	0
41	(New South Wales)	Lloyd Perris	178	77	2 January 1995	19		NSW/ACT (U18)
43	(Victoria (state))	Lewis Melican	194	80	4 November 1996	18		Geelong U18
45	(New South Wales)	Jordan Foote	183	76	2 January 1996	18		UNSW-Eastern Suburbs, Sydney Swans Academy
Senior coaching panel
	State	Coach	Coaching position				Sydney Coaching debut	Former clubs as coach
	(New South Wales)	John Longmire	Senior coach				2011
	(Victoria (state))	John Blakey	Assistant coach (defence)				2006	Brisbane Lions (a)
	(South Australia)	Stuart Dew	Assistant coach (strategy and midfield)				2009
	(Victoria (state))	Henry Playfair	Assistant coach (Forwards)				2010	Sydney Swans (NEAFL) (s)
	(South Australia)	Josh Francou	Assistant coach (midfield)				2015
	(South Australia)	Jared Crouch	Development coach				2011

- For players: (c) denotes captain, (vc) denotes vice-captain, (lg) denotes leadership group.
- For coaches: (s) denotes senior coach, (cs) denotes caretaker senior coach, (a) denotes assistant coach, (d) denotes development coach.

== Playing list changes ==
The following summarises all player changes between the conclusion of the 2014 season and the beginning of the 2015 season.

=== In ===
Player	Previous Club	League	via
(New South Wales) Isaac Heeney	Cardiff	BDAFL	AFL National Draft, first round (No. 18 overall), Sydney Swans Academy selection
(South Australia) James Rose	Sturt	SANFL	AFL National Draft, second round (No. 37 overall)
(New South Wales) Jack Hiscox	Sydney Uni	NEAFL	AFL National Draft, second round (No. 38 overall), Sydney Swans Academy selection
(New South Wales) Abaina Davis	UNSW-Eastern Suburbs	NEAFL	AFL National Draft, fourth round (No. 70 overall), Sydney Swans Academy selection
(Victoria (state)) Sean McLaren	Sandringham	TAC Cup	AFL Rookie Draft, first round (No. 17 overall)
(Victoria (state)) Nic Newman	Frankston	VFL	AFL Rookie Draft, second round (No. 35 overall)
(Victoria (state)) Lewis Melican	Geelong U18	TAC Cup	AFL Rookie Draft, third round (No. 52 overall)
(New South Wales) Jordan Foote	UNSW-Eastern Suburbs	NEAFL	AFL Rookie Draft, ninth round (No. 76 overall)

=== Out ===
Player	New Club	League	via
(Victoria (state)) Lewis Roberts-Thomson			Retired
(Victoria (state)) Ryan O'Keefe			Retired
(Victoria (state)) Nick Malceski	Gold Coast	AFL	Free Agency
(Victoria (state)) Shane Biggs	Western Bulldogs	AFL	Trade
(Victoria (state)) Tim Membrey	St Kilda	AFL	Delisted
(Victoria (state)) Matthew Dick	Carlton	AFL	Delisted
(Western Australia) Jordan Lockyer	Subiaco	WAFL	Delisted
(Republic of Ireland) Tommy Walsh			Returned to Ireland
(United States) Patrick Mitchell			Returned to USA

=== List management ===
Player	Change
(Victoria (state)) Xavier Richards	Promoted from the rookie list to the senior list during AFL National Draft (pick 94)
(Victoria (state)) Jake Lloyd	Promoted from the rookie list to the senior list during AFL National Draft (pick 112)
(New South Wales) Daniel Robinson	Promoted from the rookie list to the senior list during AFL National Draft (pick 130)

== Season summary ==
=== Pre-season matches ===
**Rd**	**Date and local time**	**Opponent**	**Scores** (Sydney's scores indicated in **bold**)			**Venue**	**Attendance**	**Ref**
**Rd**	**Date and local time**	**Opponent**	Home	Away	Result	**Venue**	**Attendance**	**Ref**
1	Friday, 6 March (7:10 pm)	Brisbane Lions	**1.4.6 (39)**	0.10.15 (75)	Lost by 36 points	Coffs Harbour International Stadium (H)	4,077	
2	Sunday, 15 March (4:10 pm)	Fremantle	**1.7.14 (65)**	1.6.11 (56)	Won by 9 points	Drummoyne Oval (H)	4,343	
3	Sunday, 22 March (1:10 pm)	Greater Western Sydney	0.9.13 (67)	**0.11.7 (73)**	Won by 6 points	StarTrack Oval (A)		

=== Home and away season ===
**Rd**	**Date and local time**	**Opponent**	**Scores** (Sydney's scores indicated in **bold**)			**Venue**	**Attendance**	**Ladder** **position**	**Ref**
**Rd**	**Date and local time**	**Opponent**	Home	Away	Result	**Venue**	**Attendance**	**Ladder** **position**	**Ref**
1	Saturday, 4 April (4:35 pm)	Essendon	**10.12 (72)**	9.6 (60)	Won by 12 points	ANZ Stadium (H)	23,274	**5th**	
2	Saturday, 11 April (7:10 pm)	Port Adelaide	6.8 (44)	**14.8 (92)**	Won by 48 points	Adelaide Oval (A)	49,765	**2nd**	
3	Saturday, 18 April (4:35 pm)	Greater Western Sydney	**16.15 (111)**	12.18 (90)	Won by 21 points	SCG (H)	31,966	**2nd**	
4	Saturday, 25 April (6:40 pm)	Fremantle	11.8 (74)	**8.12 (60)**	Lost by 14 points	Patersons Stadium (A)	39,009	**4th**	
5	Saturday, 2 May (2:10 pm)	Western Bulldogs	**10.13 (73)**	11.11 (77)	Lost by 4 points	SCG (H)	25,541	**6th**	
6	Saturday, 9 May (7:20 pm)	Melbourne	7.8 (50)	**12.16 (88)**	Won by 38 points	MCG (A)	26,894	**4th**	
7	Saturday, 16 May (7:20 pm)	Geelong	**18.12 (120)**	11.11 (77)	Won by 43 points	ANZ Stadium (H)	28,063	**3rd**	
8	Saturday, 23 May (7:20 pm)	Hawthorn	9.15 (69)	**11.7 (73)**	Won by 4 points	MCG (A)	63,319	**3rd**	
9	Friday, 29 May (7:50 pm)	Carlton	**19.8 (122)**	9.8 (62)	Won by 60 points	SCG (H)	32,105	**3rd**	
10	Saturday, 6 June (4:35 pm)	Gold Coast	5.11 (41)	**13.15 (93)**	Won by 52 points	Metricon Stadium (A)	13,068	**2nd**	
11	Saturday, 13 June (7:20 pm)	North Melbourne	10.15 (75)	**14.7 (91)**	Won by 16 points	Etihad Stadium (A)	32,217	**2nd**	
12	Bye							**3rd**	
13	Friday, 26 June (7:50 pm)	Richmond	**11.11 (77)**	14.11 (95)	Lost by 18 points	SCG (H)	37,579	**3rd**	
14	Thursday, 2 July (7:20 pm)	Port Adelaide	**14.10 (94)**	12.12 (84)	Won by 10 points	SCG (H)	28,316	**3rd**	
15	Sunday, 12 July (4:40 pm)	Brisbane Lions	7.7 (49)	**10.10 (70)**	Won by 21 points	The Gabba (A)	16,936	**3rd**	
16	Saturday, 18 July (7:20 pm)	Hawthorn	**7.15 (57)**	23.8 (146)	Lost by 89 points	ANZ Stadium (H)	37,369	**4th**	
17	Sunday, 26 July (2:40 pm)	West Coast	15.13 (103)	**7.9 (51)**	Lost by 52 points	Patersons Stadium (A)	38,760	**4th**	
18	Saturday, 1 August (4:35 pm)	Adelaide	**17.15 (117)**	9.11 (65)	Won by 52 points	SCG (H)	38,690	**4th**	
19	Saturday, 8 August (7:20 pm)	Geelong	14.11 (95)	**9.9 (63)**	Lost by 32 points	Simonds Stadium (A)	27,910	**5th**	
20	Friday, 14 August (7:50 pm)	Collingwood	**13.9 (87)**	10.16 (76)	Won by 11 points	SCG (H)	38,408	**5th**	
21	Saturday, 22 August (2:10 pm)	Greater Western Sydney	6.8 (44)	**20.13 (133)**	Won by 89 points	Spotless Stadium (A)	19,507	**4th**	
22	Sunday, 30 August (3:20 pm)	St Kilda	4.14 (38)	**20.15 (135)**	Won by 97 points	Etihad Stadium (A)	27,856	**4th**	
23	Saturday, 5 September (7:20pm)	Gold Coast	**19.13 (127)**	9.10 (64)	Won by 63 points	SCG (H)	25,424	**4th**	

=== Finals matches ===
**Rd**	**Date and local time**	**Opponent**	**Scores** (Sydney's scores indicated in **bold**)			**Venue**	**Attendance**	**Ref**
**Rd**	**Date and local time**	**Opponent**	Home	Away	Result	**Venue**	**Attendance**	**Ref**
QF	Saturday, 12 September (1:20 pm)	Fremantle	10.9 (69)	**7.18 (60)**	Lost by 9 points	Patersons Stadium (A)	40,071	
SF	Saturday, 19 September (7:20 pm)	North Melbourne	**7.9 (51)**	11.11 (77)	Lost by 26 points	ANZ Stadium (H)	31,162	

== Ladder ==
Pos	Team	Pld	W	L	D	PF	PA	PP	Pts	Qualification
1	Fremantle	22	17	5	0	1857	1564	118.7	68	Finals series
2	West Coast	22	16	5	1	2330	1572	148.2	66	Finals series
3	Hawthorn (P)	22	16	6	0	2452	1548	158.4	64	Finals series
4	Sydney	22	16	6	0	2006	1578	127.1	64	Finals series
5	Richmond	22	15	7	0	1930	1568	123.1	60	Finals series
6	Western Bulldogs	22	14	8	0	2101	1825	115.1	56	Finals series
7	Adelaide	21	13	8	0	2107	1821	115.7	54 (Note: The round 14 match between Adelaide and Geelong was cancelled due to the death of Adelaide coach Phil Walsh, and both teams were awarded two premiership points each.)	Finals series
8	North Melbourne	22	13	9	0	2062	1937	106.5	52	Finals series
9	Port Adelaide	22	12	10	0	2002	1874	106.8	48	
10	Geelong	21	11	9	1	1853	1833	101.1	48	
11	Greater Western Sydney	22	11	11	0	1872	1891	99.0	44	
12	Collingwood	22	10	12	0	1972	1856	106.3	40	
13	Melbourne	22	7	15	0	1573	2044	77.0	28	
14	St Kilda	22	6	15	1	1695	2162	78.4	26	
15	Essendon	22	6	16	0	1580	2134	74.0	24	
16	Gold Coast	22	4	17	1	1633	2240	72.9	18	
17	Brisbane Lions	22	4	18	0	1557	2306	67.5	16	
18	Carlton	22	4	18	0	1525	2354	64.8	16	

Rules for classification: 1) points; 2) percentage; 3) number of points for.
(P) Premiers

== Team awards and records ==
Game records

- In Round 1, Sydney trailed Essendon by 41 points during time on in the third quarter, before Sydney scored the last eight goals of the game to come from behind to record a twelve-point win. Sydney's three-quarter time deficit of 34 points was the largest it had ever overcome to win in the club's history.

== Individual awards and records ==
=== Bob Skilton Medal ===
Bob Skilton Medal
Rank	Player	Votes
1	Josh Kennedy	831
2	Dan Hannebery	742
3	Kieren Jack	586
4	Heath Grundy	575
5	Jarrad McVeigh	568
6	Dane Rampe	559
7	Luke Parker	523
8	Kurt Tippett	482
9	Tom Mitchell	464
10	Nick Smith	460

Rising Star Award: Isaac Heeney

Dennis Carroll Trophy for Most Improved Player: Tom Mitchell

Barry Round Shield for Best Clubman: Rhyce Shaw

Paul Kelly Players’ Player: Josh Kennedy

Paul Roos Award for Best Player in a Finals Series: Josh Kennedy

=== All-Australian Team ===
- Dan Hannebery (wing)
- Josh Kennedy (nominated)

=== AFL Players Association awards ===
Most Courageous Player: Luke Parker
Best First Year Player: Isaac Heeney

=== Milestones ===
- Round 2 - Ted Richards (200 club games), Dane Rampe (50 career games)
- Round 5 - Jeremy Laidler (50 career games)
- Round 7 - Jarrad McVeigh (250 career games), Gary Rohan (50 career games)
- Round 9 - Ben McGlynn (150 career games), Lance Franklin (100 club goals)
- Round 10 - Mike Pyke (100 career games)
- Round 17 - Josh Kennedy (150 career games)
- Round 19 - Luke Parker (100 career games)
- Round 21 - Kurt Tippett (100 club goals)
- Round 22 - Ted Richards (250 career games)
- Round 23 - Kurt Tippett (150 career games), Harry Cunningham (50 career games)
- Semi Final - Kurt Tippett (300 career goals)

=== Debuts ===
- Round 1 - Isaac Heeney (AFL debut)
- Round 9 - Daniel Robinson (AFL debut)
- Round 14 - Toby Nankervis (AFL debut)
- Round 21 - James Rose (AFL debut)

=== AFL Rising Star ===
The following Sydney players were nominated for the 2015 NAB AFL Rising Star award:

- Round 3 – Isaac Heeney (nominated)
- Isaac Heeney finished 4th in final voting.

=== 22under22 Team ===
The following Sydney players were selected in the 22under22 Team:

- Luke Parker (vice-captain, half-forward flank)

== Reserves ==
=== Regular season ===
**Rd**	**Date and local time**	**Opponent**	**Scores** (Sydney's scores indicated in **bold**)			**Venue**	**Ladder** **position**
**Rd**	**Date and local time**	**Opponent**	Home	Away	Result	**Venue**	**Ladder** **position**
1	Saturday, 11 April (11:30 am)	Ainslie	6.15 (51)	**16.12 (108)**	Won by 57 points	Ainslie Oval (A)	**2nd**
2	Saturday, 18 April (10:30 am)	UWS Giants	**9.4 (58)**	17.19 (121)	Lost by 63 points	Tramway Oval (H)	8th
3	Saturday, 25 April (12:00 pm)	Gold Coast	5.12 (42)	**16.14 (110)**	Won by 68 points	Harrup Park (A)	**3rd**
4	Saturday, 2 May (6:30 pm)	Sydney Uni	3.10 (28)	**10.9 (69)**	Won by 41 points	Drummoyne Oval (A)	**3rd**
5	Saturday, 9 May (12:55 pm)	UWS Giants	12.16 (88)	**12.9 (81)**	Lost by 7 points	Spotless Stadium (A)	**4th**
6	Saturday, 16 May (3:40 pm)	Southport	**14.13 (97)**	6.9 (45)	Won by 52 points	ANZ Stadium (H)	**3rd**
7	Bye						**3rd**
8	Saturday, 30 May (12:00 pm)	Brisbane Lions	**16.14 (110)**	5.6 (36)	Won by 74 points	Newcastle Oval (H)	**3rd**
9	Saturday, 6 June (12:55 pm)	Gold Coast	7.17 (59)	**12.17 (89)**	Won by 30 points	Metricon Stadium (A)	**3rd**
10	Saturday, 13 June (12:00 pm)	Eastlake	5.6 (36)	**14.17 (101)**	Won by 65 points	StarTrack Oval (A)	**3rd**
11	Bye						**3rd**
12	Friday, 26 June (4:10 pm)	Sydney Uni	**5.11 (41)**	18.8 (116)	Lost by 75 points	SCG (H)	**3rd**
13	Saturday, 4 July (2:00 pm)	UWS Giants	**2.2 (14)**	30.17 (197)	Lost by 183 points	Drummoyne Oval (H)	**4th**
14	Sunday, 12 July (12:00 pm)	Brisbane Lions	8.5 (53)	**13.5 (83)**	Won by 30 points	Coorparoo Oval (A)	**4th**
15	Saturday, 18 July (3:40 pm)	Redland	**16.9 (105)**	7.8 (50)	Won by 55 points	ANZ Stadium (H)	**4th**
16	Saturday, 25 July (6:30 pm)	NT Thunder	15.7 (97)	**6.8 (44)**	Lost by 53 points	TIO Stadium (A)	**4th**
17	Saturday, 1 August (12:55 pm)	Brisbane Lions	**10.26 (86)**	5.11 (41)	Won by 45 points	SCG (H)	**4th**
18	Bye						**5th**
19	Saturday, 15 August (12:00 pm)	Gold Coast	**10.7 (67)**	8.8 (56)	Won by 11 points	SCG (H)	**5th**
20	Saturday, 22 August (10:30 pm)	UWS Giants	16.26 (122)	**6.6 (42)**	Lost by 80 points	Spotless Stadium (A)	**5th**
21	Saturday, 29 August (12:00 pm)	Aspley	9.11 (65)	**12.13 (85)**	Won by 20 points	Graham Road Oval (A)	**5th**

=== Finals series ===
**Rd**	**Date and local time**	**Opponent**	**Scores** (Sydney's scores indicated in **bold**)			**Venue**
**Rd**	**Date and local time**	**Opponent**	Home	Away	Result	**Venue**
EF	Sun, 7 September (12:45 pm)	Aspley	**9.13 (67)**	9.6 (60)	Lost by 7 points	Graham Road Oval (A)

=== Ladder ===
2015 NEAFL Ladder
Pos	Team	Pld	W	L	D	PF	PA	PP	Pts
1	UWS Giants	18	16	2	0	2366	1106	213.9	64
2	NT Thunder (P)	18	15	3	0	1800	1334	134.9	60
3	Sydney University	18	12	6	0	1718	1263	136.0	48
4	Aspley	18	12	6	0	1695	1420	119.4	48
**5**	Sydney	**18**	**12**	**6**	**0**	**1390**	**1303**	**106.7**	48
6	Southport	18	8	10	0	1660	1582	104.9	32
7	Gold Coast	18	8	10	0	1573	1636	96.1	32
8	Redland	18	7	11	0	1311	1620	80.9	28
9	Ainslie	18	5	12	1	1426	1823	78.2	22
10	Brisbane	18	2	16	0	1187	1970	60.3	8
11	Eastlake	18	1	16	1	1031	2100	49.1	6

Rules for classification: 1) points; 2) percentage; 3) number of points for.
(P) Premiers

=== Awards ===
==== NEAFL Team of the Year ====
- Harry Marsh (back pocket)
- George Hewett (interchange)
