= Ron Clegg =

Australian rules footballer and coach (1927-1990)

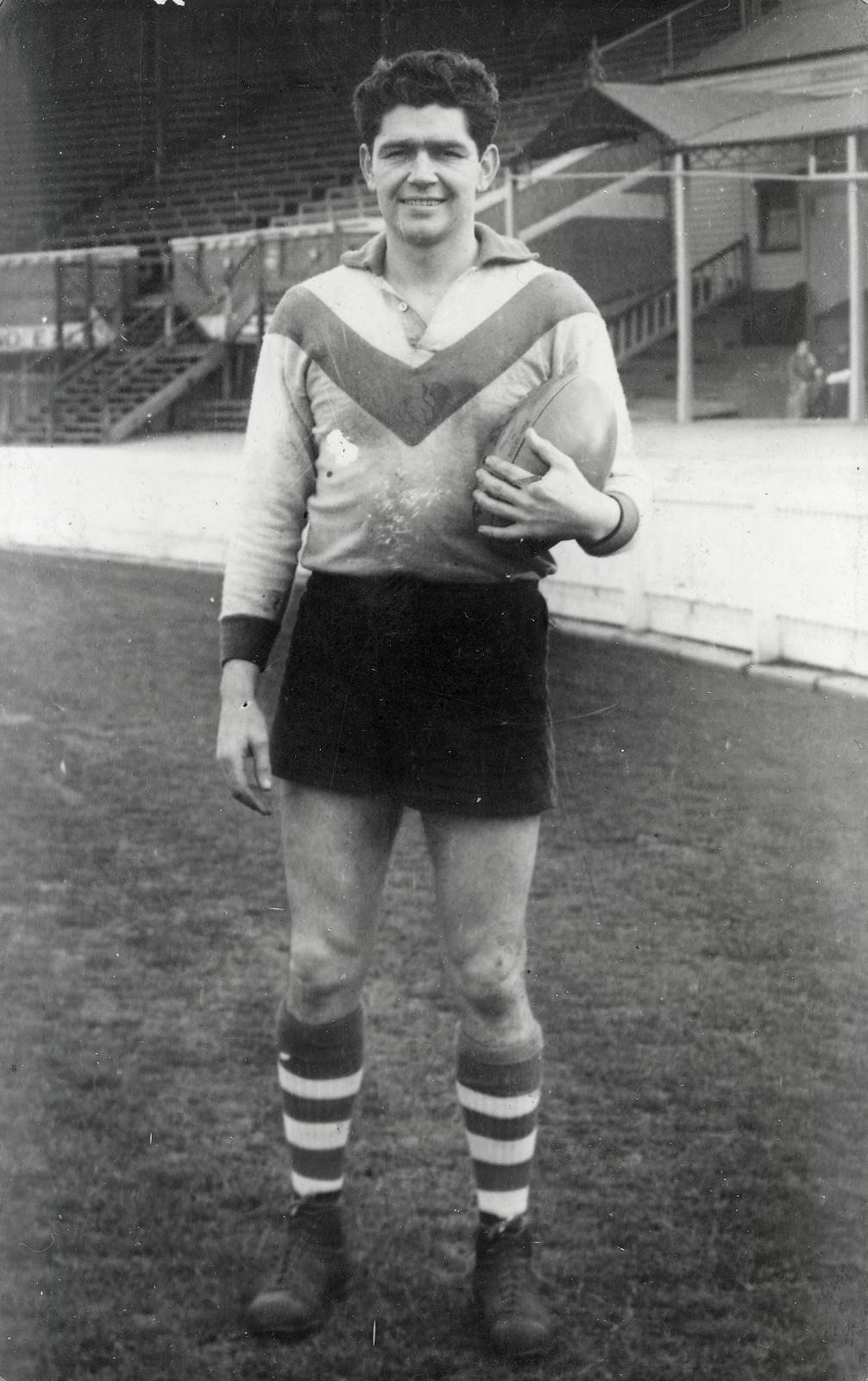

Personal information
- Born: 17 November 1927
- Died: 23 August 1990 (aged 62)
- Original team: South Melbourne Under 19's
- Height: 183 cm (6 ft 0 in)
- Weight: 84 kg (185 lb)

Playing career^{1}
Years	Club	Games (Goals)
1945-1954, 1956-1960	South Melbourne	231 (156)

Coaching career
Years	Club	Games (W–L–D)
1958–1959	South Melbourne	36 (15–21–0)
- ^{1} Playing statistics correct to the end of 1960.

Career highlights
- Brownlow Medal 1949; Runner Up Brownlow Medal 1951; South Melbourne Best & Fairest 1948, 1949, 1951; South Melbourne captain 1953-1954, 1957-1960; South Melbourne/Sydney Swans Team of the Century; Victorian representative (15 games, 7 goals)

Ron "Smokey" Clegg (17 November 1927 – 23 August 1990) was an Australian rules footballer in the (then) Victorian Football League.

Clegg was recruited from the South Melbourne Under 19's after winning the 1944 Melbourne Boys Football League's best and fairest award and was best on ground in the 1944 grand final for South Melbourne.

Richmond were very keen to secure Clegg's signature in 1944, before he settled on South Melbourne.

Clegg debuted in 1945 and from early on South Melbourne knew they had a star in the making and he played in South Melbourne's losing 1945 VFL grand final.

By the time Clegg was 18 years old he had established himself as a gifted senior player in the VFL in 1946.

A brilliant key position player at either centre half-forward or centre half-back, he was awarded the Brownlow Medal in 1949 while playing with the then South Melbourne Football Club and was runner up in the Brownlow in 1951.

He won the club's Best and Fairest award three times, in 1948, 1949 and 1951 and was runner in the 1953 award to follower, Jim Taylor and again in 1954 to Eddie Lane.

Clegg sought a clearance to New Norfolk in early 1951 and was refused a clearance, then was later appointed as vice captain of South Melbourne FC in 1951. Clegg won the 1951 London Stores Best Player Award in the VFL.

In 1951, Clegg took an incredible 32 marks against Fitzroy at the Lakeside Oval.

Clegg was appointed as club captain in 1953 and also lead the club in 1954 too.

In 1955, Clegg was captain-coach of the North Wagga Football Club in the Albury & District Football League, winning the £50 - Border Mail Newspaper / Albury & DFL Footballer of the Year Award, before returning to South Melbourne in 1956.

Clegg represented Victoria on 15 occasions in the key positions at either half forward or half back.

In 1961 and 1962, Clegg was captain-coach of the Brunswick Football Club.

Clegg played 42 first eleven games of Victorian Premier Cricket for South Melbourne between 1942 and 1947 before giving it away to concentrate on VFL football. Clegg made his debut in round one, 1942 as a 14 year old left hand bat.

In 1996, Clegg was inducted into the Australian Football Hall of Fame.

In 2003, Clegg was named at centre half back in South Melbourne's Team of the Century.
