= 1982 Swans season =

103rd season of the Swans (formerly South Melbourne)

Swans
1982 season
- Coach: Ricky Quade
- Captain: Barry Round
- Home ground: Sydney Cricket Ground
- Home-and-away: 12th
- Best-and-fairest: David Ackerly
- Leading goalkicker: Tony Morwood (45)
- Highest home attendance: 25,601 (Round 19 vs Carlton)
- Lowest home attendance: 10,034 (Round 13 vs St Kilda)
- Average home attendance: ▼15,993 (Note: The average home attendance for the Swans in 1982 was 15,993 across eleven VFL matches. South Melbourne had an average home attendance of 16,849 during the 1981 VFL season, but this included one match each at VFL Park, the Sydney Cricket Ground and the Melbourne Cricket Ground. Across the eight matches at Lake Oval in 1981, there was an average home attendance of 14,592.)

The 1982 season was the 85th season of the Swans in the Victorian Football League (VFL) and its 103rd season overall. The club – formerly known as South Melbourne – was relocated from Victoria to New South Wales this year, playing all home matches at the Sydney Cricket Ground (SCG) on Sunday afternoons.

South Melbourne had been operating at a loss of at least $150,000 for the previous five years, leading to the club's board deciding to play all 1982 home games in Sydney as a strategic opportunity to capture an untapped market and save the club. The proposal was formally accepted by the VFL in July 1981 and took place despite a large supporters' group, known as "Keep South at South", taking control of the club's board for several months in late 1981. The club was known simply as "the Swans" during the 1982 season, with the VFL approving a formal change on 2 June 1982 that saw "South Melbourne" dropped from the club's name. It was officially renamed to the "Sydney Swans" prior to the 1983 season.

On the field, the Swans had limited success during the VFL season, winning 12 of its 22 matches but missing out on the finals series. However, the club won the Australian Football Championships night series for the first and only time in its history, defeating North Melbourne in the Escort Championships grand final by 32 points. The Swans averaged an attendance of just under 16,000 people at the SCG during the home-and-away season, the lowest of any VFL club in 1982 and slightly worse than their average home attendance the previous season.

== VFL season ==
=== Home-and-away season ===
Rd	Date and local time	Opponent	Scores (Swans' scores indicated in bold)			Venue	Crowd	Ladder
Rd	Date and local time	Opponent	Home	Away	Result	Venue	Crowd	Ladder
1	Sunday, 28 March (2:10 pm)	Melbourne	**20.17 (137)**	16.12 (108)	Won by 29 points	SCG (H)	15,764	4th
2	Saturday, 3 April (2:10 pm)	North Melbourne	24.13 (157)	**16.21 (117)**	Lost by 40 points	Arden Street Oval (A)	14,097	7th
3	Saturday, 10 April (2:10 pm)	St Kilda	17.14 (116)	**20.22 (142)**	Won by 26 points	Moorabbin Oval (A)	17,811	6th
4	Sunday, 18 April (2:10 pm)	Fitzroy	**24.18 (162)**	14.22 (106)	Won by 56 points	SCG (H)	13,617	4th
5	Sunday, 24 April (2:10 pm)	Geelong	12.12 (84)	**11.16 (82)**	Lost by 2 points	Kardinia Park (A)	20,770	6th
6	Sunday, 2 May (2:10 pm)	Essendon	**15.21 (111)**	18.9 (117)	Lost by 6 points	SCG (H)	15,461	6th
7	Saturday, 8 May (2:10 pm)	Footscray	15.20 (110)	**20.11 (131)**	Won by 21 points	Western Oval (A)	11,487	7th
8	Sunday, 16 May (2:10 pm)	Collingwood	**15.25 (115)**	13.19 (97)	Won by 18 points	SCG (H)	20,905	6th
9	Saturday, 22 May (2:10 pm)	Carlton	27.23 (185)	**12.11 (83)**	Lost by 102 points	Princes Park (A)	23,954	7th
10	Sunday, 30 May (2:10 pm)	Hawthorn	**15.13 (103)**	24.13 (157)	Lost by 54 points	SCG (H)	15,420	8th
11	Saturday, 5 June (2:10 pm)	Richmond	20.14 (134)	**18.25 (133)**	Lost by 1 point	MCG (A)	28,216	8th
12	Sunday, 13 June (2:10 pm)	North Melbourne	**15.15 (105)**	16.15 (111)	Lost by 6 points	SCG (H)	14,523	8th
13	Sunday, 20 June (2:10 pm)	St Kilda	**30.19 (199)**	15.13 (103)	Won by 96 points	SCG (H)	10,034	7th
14	Saturday, 26 June (2:10 pm)	Fitzroy	16.16 (112)	**20.13 (133)**	Won by 21 points	Junction Oval (A)	12,300	6th
15	Sunday, 4 July (2:10 pm)	Geelong	**18.18 (126)**	12.15 (87)	Won by 39 points	SCG (H)	12,221	6th
16	Saturday, 17 July (2:10 pm)	Essendon	12.10 (82)	**17.13 (115)**	Won by 33 points	Windy Hill (A)	22,278	6th
17	Sunday, 25 July (2:10 pm)	Footscray	**14.27 (111)**	15.8 (98)	Won by 13 points	SCG (H)	11,289	6th
18	Saturday, 31 July (2:10 pm)	Collingwood	12.13 (85)	**13.12 (90)**	Won by 5 points	Victoria Park (A)	20,636	6th
19	Sunday, 8 August (2:10 pm)	Carlton	**15.16 (106)**	9.18 (72)	Won by 34 points	SCG (H)	25,601	6th
20	Saturday, 14 August (2:10 pm)	Hawthorn	18.18 (126)	**8.14 (62)**	Lost by 64 points	Princes Park (A)	15,743	6th
21	Sunday, 22 August (2:10 pm)	Richmond	**16.14 (110)**	19.13 (127)	Lost by 17 points	SCG (H)	21,083	7th
22	Saturday, 28 August (2:10 pm)	Melbourne	25.13 (163)	**22.16 (148)**	Lost by 15 points	MCG (A)	27,521	7th

== Escort Championships ==
Rd	Date and local time	Opponent	Scores (Swans' scores indicated in bold)			Venue	Crowd
Rd	Date and local time	Opponent	Home	Away	Result	Venue	Crowd
1	Tuesday, 11 May (8:30 pm)	South Fremantle	**24.16 (160)**	6.9 (45)	Won by 115 points	VFL Park	4,752
QF	Tuesday, 8 June (8:30 pm)	St Kilda	7.9 (51)	**8.11 (59)**	Won by 8 points	VFL Park	4,761
SF	Tuesday, 6 July (8:30 pm)	Richmond	**13.17 (95)**	7.9 (51)	Won by 53 points	VFL Park	4,955
GF	Tuesday, 20 July (8:30 pm)	North Melbourne	8.10 (58)	**13.12 (90)**	Won by 32 points	VFL Park	20,028
