= Wagga Tigers =

Wagga

Names
- Full name: Wagga Tigers Football and Netball Club
- Former name(s): Federal Football Club (1861–1947)
- Nickname: Tigers
- Club song: "We're from Tigerland"

Club details
- Founded: 1861; 165 years ago
- Colours
- Competition: Riverina Football Netball League
- President: Paul Lucas
- Coach: Murray Stephenson
- Ground: Robertson Oval (capacity: 9,000)

Uniforms
Home

Other information
- Official website: waggatigers.com.au

The Wagga Tigers Football and Netball Club, nicknamed the Tigers, is an Australian rules football club based at Robertson Oval in Wagga Wagga, New South Wales, Australia. Its senior men's team competes in the Riverina Football Netball League. It also fields a women's team in the Southern NSW Women's League, junior teams in the Wagga & District Junior Football Association and a women's netball team. Formed as the Federal Football Club in 1861, it is the oldest football club in New South Wales and the oldest outside of Victoria. The club has won more than 22 senior football premierships, the first of which was in 1887.

== History ==
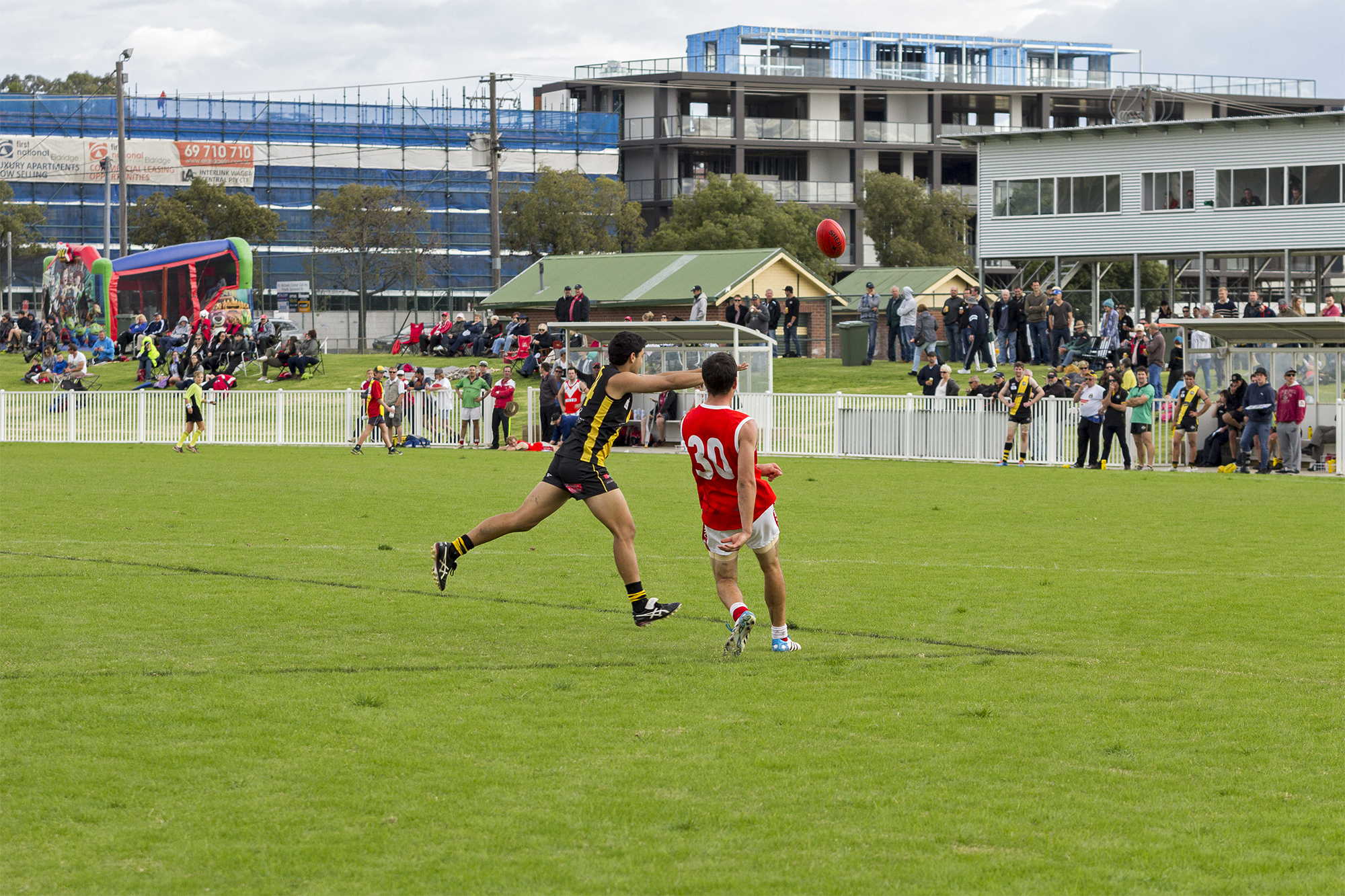
RFNL match between Wagga Tigers and Collingullie at Robertson Oval in 2015

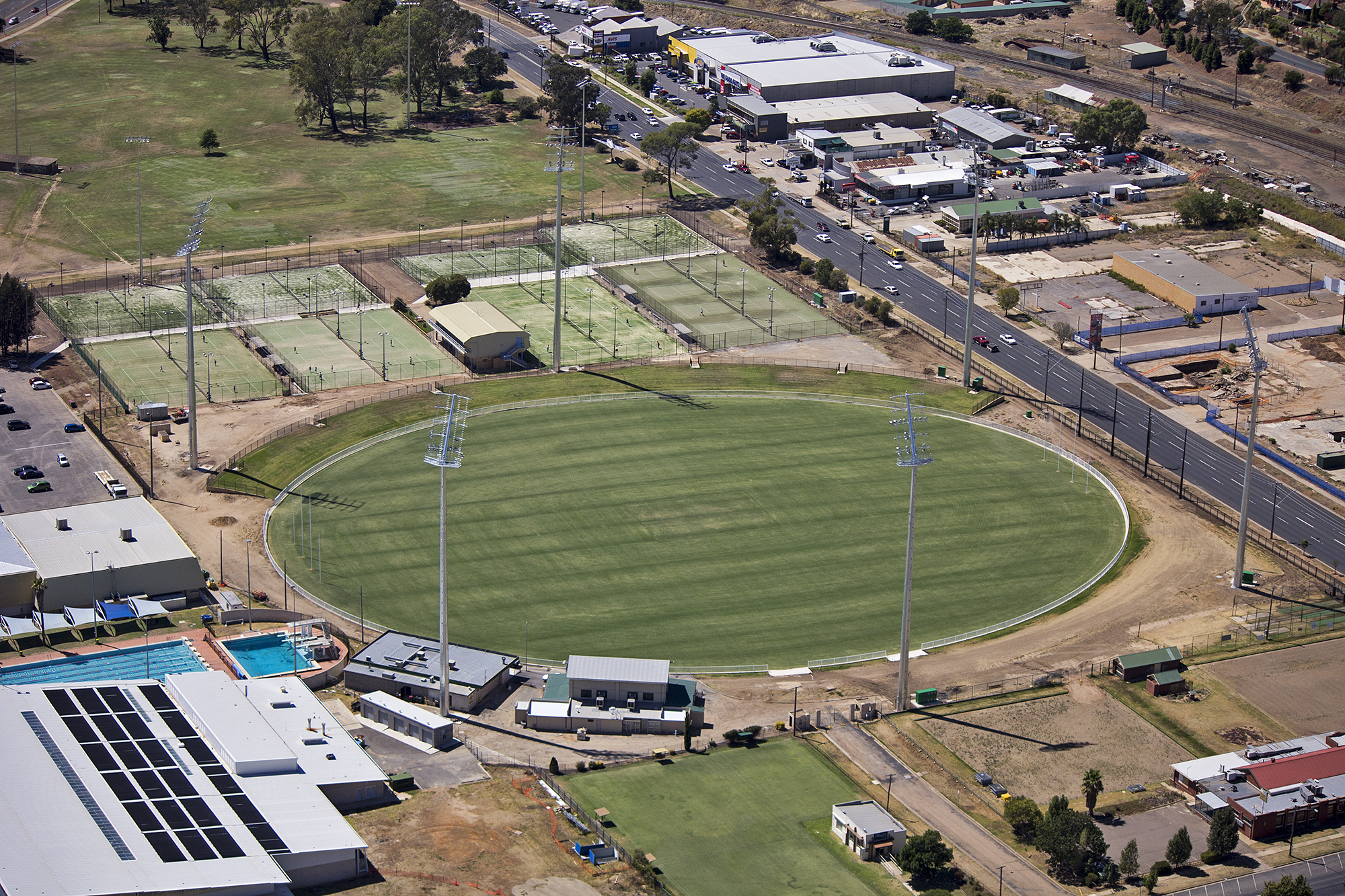
Robertson Oval Wagga, from the air home of the Tigers

The Federal Football Club was formed at the Imperial Hotel in Wagga Wagga in 1861, making it the oldest Australian rules football club outside of Victoria, however little else of the early history of the club. Its first recorded interclub matches did not appear for at least another decade. Federal wore red and white vertical stripes. It appears to have organised scratch intraclub scratch matches and early records appear to indicate that it aligned with the Victorian Rules of football.

In response to the rapid growth of the Victorian code the newly formed Sydney based Southern Rugby Football Union (SRFU) in 1874 instituted a ban on its member clubs from playing any matches under those rules. Wagga were left with little other option than to organise local scratch matches as most surrounding clubs had by then begun adopting rugby.

Its first recorded interclub match was in 1881 against the Albury Football Club in Wagga, just a year before the first rugby matches were held in the region. Despite the SRFU ban, the Victorian code was rapidly growing in popularity and by 1882 there were two more clubs in Wagga. The club competed against newly formed opponents such as Narrandera, Albury Mechanics and Wagga Mechanics in 1882. Local competition between clubs commenced in earnest in 1884 around Wagga Wagga which became the Wagga Football Association.

In 1949, the Richmond Football Club provided jumpers and the club was renamed the Wagga Tigers. The club has gone on to sustained success with consistent premierships in each decade since.

== Premierships ==
1887, 1957, 1958, 1959, 1961, 1962, 1975, 1977, 1978, 1980, 1981, 1985, 1993, 1994, 1995, 1997, 1998, 1999, 2001, 2007, 2016, 2019, 2020

== AFL/VFL players ==
There is a list of players who have played at AFL/VFL:

- Ron Birch
- James Byrne
- John Bradley
- Bryce Campbell
- Paul Hawke
- Paul Kelly
- Kim Kershaw
- Bill Lampe
- Neville Miller
- Bill Mohr
- Jack Mohr
- Ted Obudzinski
- John Pitura
- Brad Seymour
- Isaac Smith
- Matt Suckling
