= 1939 Hawthorn Football Club season =

15th season in the Victorian Football League

Hawthorn Football Club
1939 season
- President: Dr. Jacob Jona
- Coach: Len Thomas
- Captain: Len Thomas
- Home ground: Glenferrie Oval
- VFL Season: 5–12–1 (10th)
- Finals Series: Did not qualify
- Best and Fairest: Bert Mills
- Leading goalkicker: Alec Albiston (37)
- Highest home attendance: 21,000 (Round 8 vs. Richmond
- Lowest home attendance: 6,000 (Round 15 vs. Fitzroy)
- Average home attendance: 12,889

The 1939 season was the Hawthorn Football Club's 15th season in the Victorian Football League and 38th overall.

== Fixture ==
=== Premiership Season ===
Rd	Date and local time	Opponent	Scores (Hawthorn's scores indicated in bold)			Venue	Attendance	Record
Rd	Date and local time	Opponent	Home	Away	Result	Venue	Attendance	Record
1	Saturday, 22 April (2:45 pm)	St Kilda	18.20 (128)	**9.13 (67)**	Lost by 61 points	Junction Oval (A)	15,500	0–1
2	Saturday, 29 April (2:45 pm)	North Melbourne	**17.13 (115)**	11.11 (77)	Won by 38 points	Glenferrie Oval (H)	11,000	1–1
3	Saturday, 6 May (2:45 pm)	Geelong	**17.14 (116)**	8.18 (66)	Won by 50 points	Glenferrie Oval (H)	12,000	2–1
4	Saturday, 13 May (2:45 pm)	Fitzroy	10.17 (77)	**11.11 (77)**	Draw	Brunswick Street Oval (A)	12,000	2–1–1
5	Saturday, 20 May (2:45 pm)	Carlton	**13.8 (86)**	11.17 (83)	Won by 3 points	Glenferrie Oval (H)	20,000	3–1–1
6	Saturday, 27 May (2:45 pm)	Collingwood	14.14 (98)	**12.7 (79)**	Lost by 19 points	Victoria Park (A)	15,000	3–2–1
7	Saturday, 3 June (2:30 pm)	Footscray	**12.15 (87)**	7.23 (65)	Won by 22 points	Glenferrie Oval (H)	12,500	4–2–1
8	Saturday, 10 June (2:45 pm)	Richmond	**7.13 (55)**	12.21 (93)	Lost by 38 points	Glenferrie Oval (H)	21,000	4–3–1
9	Saturday, 17 June (2:45 pm)	South Melbourne	15.18 (108)	**12.14 (86)**	Lost by 22 points	Lake Oval (A)	9,000	4–4–1
10	Saturday, 24 June (2:45 pm)	Essendon	19.11 (125)	**16.19 (115)**	Lost by 10 points	Windy Hill (A)	11,000	4–5–1
11	Saturday, 1 July (2:45 pm)	Melbourne	**8.4 (52)**	7.12 (54)	Lost by 2 points	Glenferrie Oval (H)	8,000	4–6–1
12	Saturday, 8 July (2:45 pm)	St Kilda	**11.18 (84)**	15.17 (107)	Lost by 23 points	Glenferrie Oval (H)	18,000	4–7–1
13	Saturday, 15 July (2:45 pm)	North Melbourne	18.11 (119)	**11.16 (82)**	Lost by 37 points	Arden Street Oval (A)	8,000	4–8–1
14	Saturday, 22 July (2:45 pm)	Geelong	15.22 (112)	**13.12 (90)**	Lost by 22 points	Corio Oval (A)	5,000	4–9–1
15	Saturday, 5 August (2:45 pm)	Fitzroy	**10.20 (80)**	12.7 (79)	Won by 1 point	Glenferrie Oval (H)	6,000	5–9–1
16	Saturday, 12 August (2:45 pm)	Carlton	18.16 (124)	**7.20 (62)**	Lost by 62 points	Princes Park (A)	11,000	5–10–1
17	Saturday, 19 August (2:45 pm)	Collingwood	**6.15 (51)**	7.17 (59)	Lost by 8 points	Glenferrie Oval (H)	7,500	5–11–1
18	Saturday, 2 September (2:45 pm)	Footscray	11.17 (83)	**6.7 (43)**	Lost by 40 points	Western Oval (A)	3,500	5–12–1

== Ladder ==
(P)	Premiers
	Qualified for finals

#	Team	P	W	L	D	PF	PA	%	Pts
1	Melbourne (P)	18	15	3	0	1928	1502	128.4	60
2	Collingwood	18	15	3	0	1872	1535	122.0	60
3	Richmond	18	13	5	0	1734	1469	118.0	52
4	St Kilda	18	13	5	0	1806	1550	116.5	52
5	Carlton	18	12	6	0	1796	1459	123.1	48
6	Essendon	18	8	10	0	1696	1749	97.0	32
7	Geelong	18	7	11	0	1582	1713	92.4	28
8	Fitzroy	18	6	11	1	1482	1661	89.2	26
9	North Melbourne	18	6	12	0	1561	1709	91.3	24
10	Hawthorn	18	5	12	1	1427	1657	86.1	22
11	Footscray	18	4	14	0	1494	1809	82.6	16
12	South Melbourne	18	3	15	0	1367	1932	70.8	12

Rules for classification: 1. premiership points; 2. percentage; 3. points for
Average score: 91.4
Source: AFL Tables
