= Jack Dorgan =

Australian rules footballer

Personal information
- Full name: John Walter Dorgan
- Nickname: Black Jack
- Born: 8 November 1926
- Died: 2 September 2001 (aged 74)

Playing career^{1}
Years	Club	Games (Goals)
1949	Melbourne	3 (0)
- ^{1} Playing statistics correct to the end of 1949.

John Walter 'Jack' Dorgan (8 November 1926 – 2 September 2001) was an Australian rules footballer who played with Melbourne in the Victorian Football League (VFL) in 1949.

After leaving the VFL, Dorgan was cleared to Richmond before playing for the Williamstown Rovers in 1950 before moving to play for Echuca in 1951, winning their best and fairest award. He later played for and coached Echuca East and was awarded a life membership of Echuca in 1999.

For many years, Jack's brother Jim was officially credited with playing the three games for Melbourne in 1949 as well as over one hundred games for South Melbourne. A third brother, Frank, was a premiership winning coach of the Williamstown Rovers.
