= Robertson Oval =

Sports ground in New South Wales, Australia

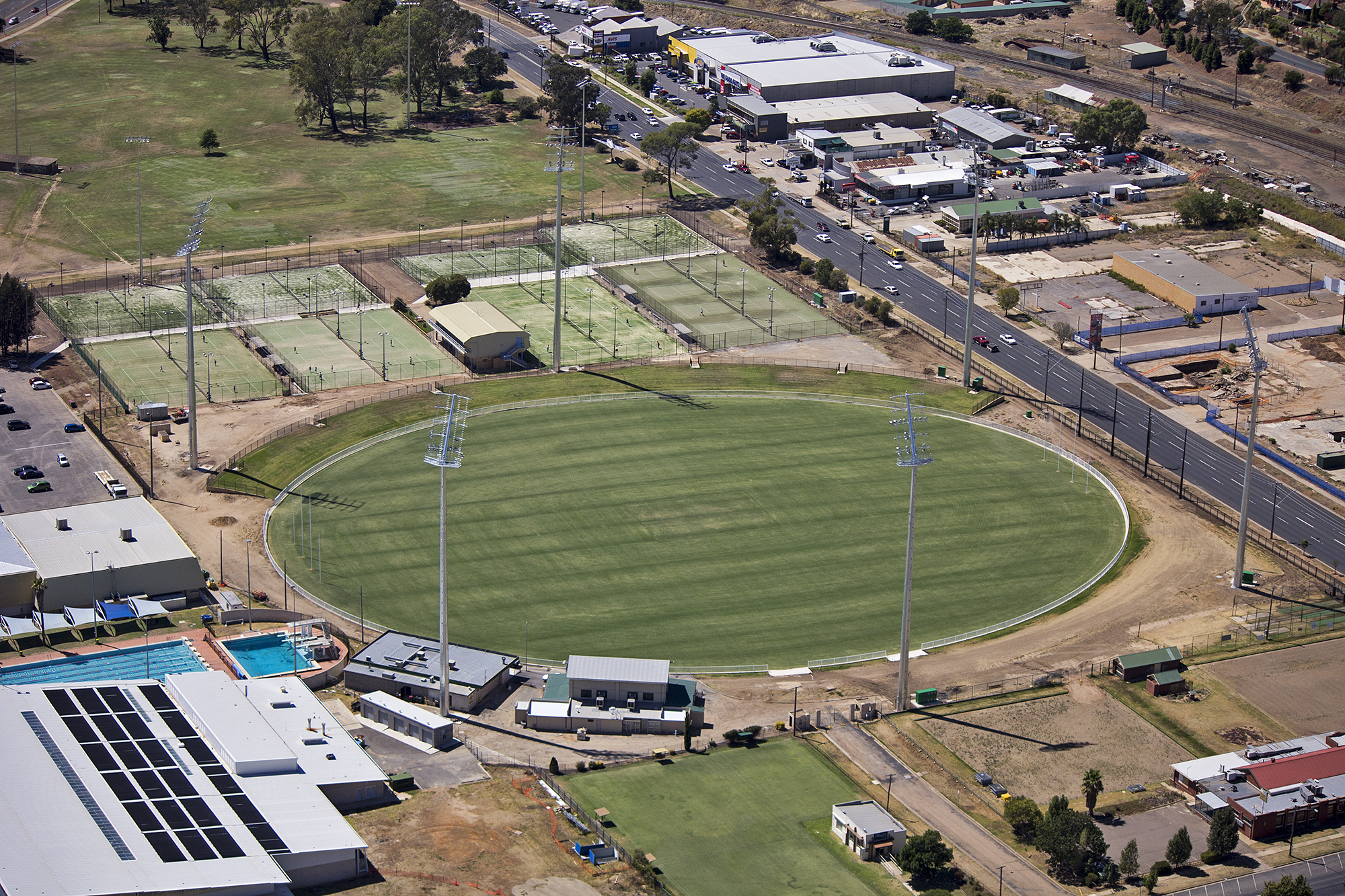
- Aerial view of Robertson Oval, post redevelopment
- Interactive map of Robertson Oval
- Location: Edward Street, Wagga Wagga, New South Wales, Australia
- Coordinates: 35°7′6″S 147°22′20″E
- Owner: Wagga Wagga City Council (grounds); Wagga Tigers (clubrooms)
- Operator: New South Wales Cricket Association
- Capacity: 9,000
- Surface: Grass

Construction
- Opened: First recorded cricket match 1878
- Renovated: 2013

Tenant
- New South Wales cricket team

The Robertson Oval is a multi-use sports facility in Wagga Wagga, New South Wales, Australia. It primarily hosts cricket, Australian rules football and rugby league matches. A grass embankment runs around three-quarters of the oval with a 350-seat grandstand and social club on western side of the ground. Plans are in place for a 3–5 million dollar redevelopment of the arena. As the oval is located in the heart of Wagga Wagga CBD, the AFL and New South Wales Cricket Association will use the oval after redevelopment preferring it to other regional venues.

== Teams ==
- Wagga Tigers – Aussie Rules, Riverina Football League
- Hosts matches for various teams from the Wagga Cricket League

NOTE: The playing surface is currently too small to host top-class cricket and AFL matches, something the redevelopment will address.

== History ==
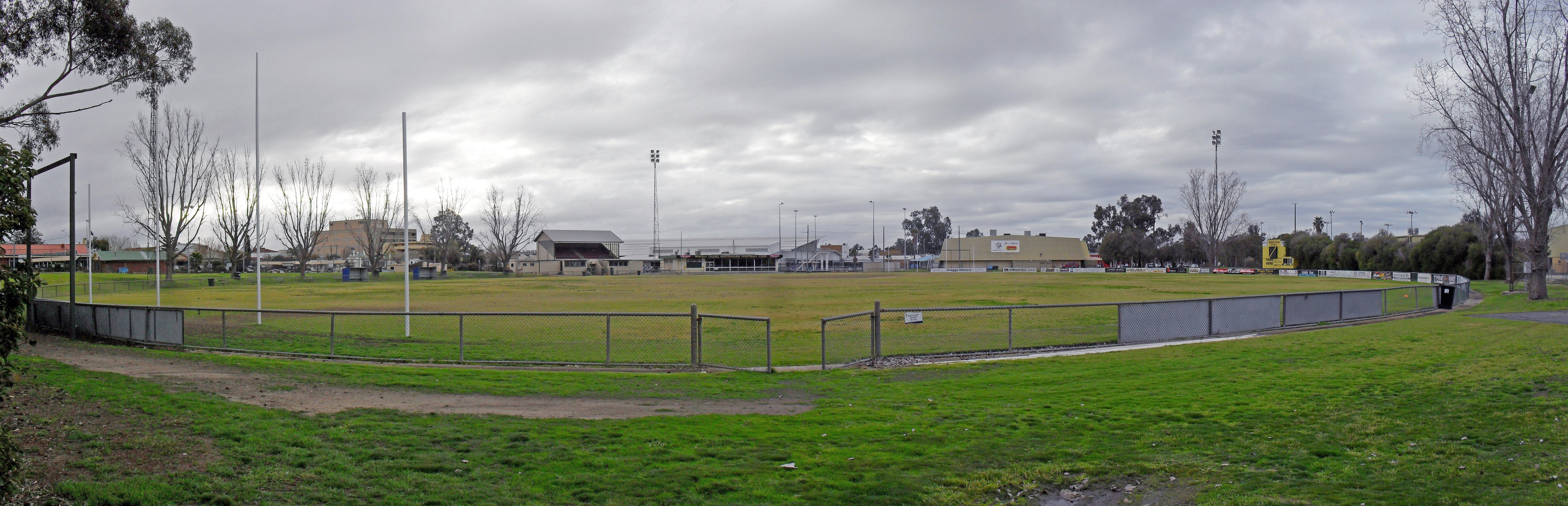
Panorama of Robertson Oval in 2009

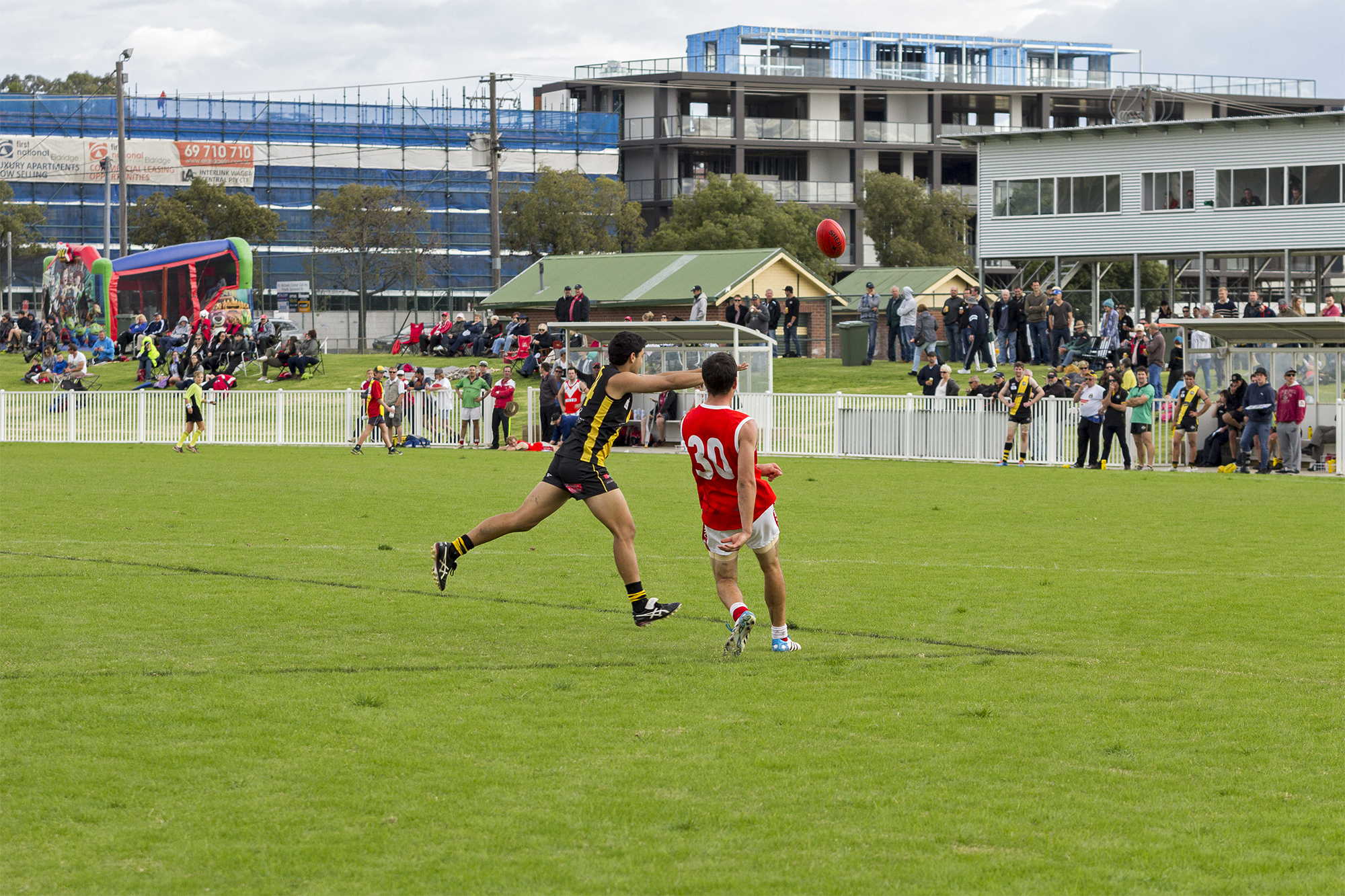
Wagga Tigers vs Collingullie at Robertson Oval in 2015

A cricket match between Wagga Wagga and an Australian XI on 8 March 1878 is the first recorded First-Grade cricket match at the Robertson Oval. 22 men of Wagga Wagga took on 11 Australians in a two-day match. The Australians, under their first captain, Dave Gregory won by an innings and 117 runs. The match was played in preparation for the 1878 Tour to England.

The ground was the venue for a Sheffield Shield game between New South Wales and Victoria from February 15 to 18, 2015, due to the unavailability of the Sydney Cricket Ground during the 2015 World Cup.

The city will also host under-14 State Challenge matches in 2016 and 2017 and there will be funding set aside to help develop cricket at a grassroots level too.

The Australians scorecard is noted below:

Australians First Innings		Runs
C Bannerman	c Harris b Douglas	2
AC Bannerman	c & b Douglas	2
TP Horan	b Thompson	8
GH Bailey	b Thompson	16
*DW Gregory	c Black b Thompson	36
TW Garrett	c Douglas b Harris	73
WL Murdoch	b Nelson	93
+JM Blackham	c Crocker b Blakeney	14
HF Boyle	not out	2
FE Allan	c Blakeney b Nelson	0
TK Kendall	absent	
Sundries		14
Total	(all out, 162.3 overs)	260

Fall of Wickets: 1-? (C Bannerman), 2-? (AC Bannerman), 3-21 (Horan), 4-42 (Bailey), 5-98 (Gregory), 6-202 (Garrett), 7-253 (Blackham), 8-260 (Murdoch), 9-260 (Allan, 162.3 ov)

Wagga Wagga Bowling	Overs	Maidens	Runs	Wkts
Thompson	73	29	94	3
Douglas	44	16	46	2
Howard	4	0	6	0
Fell	4	0	14	0
Clayton	2	0	7	0
Troy	5	1	22	0
Harris	23	6	36	1
Nelson	4.3	1	15	2
Blakeney	3	0	7	1

== Attendance records ==
- 11,000 in 1960 for an International Rugby league match (France 25 beat Riverina 14)
- 10,732 in 1954 for an International Rugby League match between Great Britain and a Riverina Invitational side. Great Britain were on a gruelling tour of Australia and New Zealand of over three months, including 32 matches. The British, captained by Willie Horne won narrowly 36–26. Great Britain would later go on to win the inaugural Rugby League World Cup, in France, later that year.

== Notable cricket matches ==
10 and 12 December 1932 (2-day Match)
scorecard

Southern New South Wales	v	Marylebone Cricket Club
226 (60.6 overs); S Sly 67*; Mitchell 7/77 (19.6)		313 (61.3 overs); LEG Ames 91; Rumble 5/73 (17.3)
68/7 (15 overs); SL Josselyn; Mitchell 5/26 (6)

Match Drawn
Umpires: F Hamilton & D Mooney

9 February 1959 (Single Inning One Day Match)
scorecard

Southern New South Wales	v	Marylebone Cricket Club
117 (35.7 overs); M Rudd 24; Laker 4/22 (12)		260/8 (35 overs); PE Richardson 77; Stuckings 3/96 (13)

MCC Won by 8 wickets and batted on

7 January 1971 (Single Inning One Day Match)
scorecard

New South Wales Country	v	Marylebone Cricket Club
117 (39.2 overs); M Shepherd 35; Cowdrey 2/9 (1.2)		241/4 (37.1 overs); G Boycott 76; Dasey 2/40 (5)

MCC Won by 6 wickets and batted on

24 January 1979 (World Series Cricket Country Cup 50 Over Match)
scorecard

WSC World XI	v	WSC Cavaliers
167 (49 overs); Haroon Rasheed 51; Prior 3/37 (10)		168/0 (47 overs); RB McCosker 89

WSC Cavaliers won by 10 wickets

5 December 1980 (50 Over Match)
scorecard

New South Wales Country	v	New Zealanders
108 (48.4 overs); G Bennett 25; Boock 5/27 (11)		174/9 (50 overs); JV Coney 46; Regan 2/16 (7)

New Zealanders won by 66 runs

21 November 1991 (50 Over Match)
scorecard

New South Wales Country	v	Indians
220/7 (50 overs); GG Geise 102; Prabhakar 5/26 (9)		221/2 (47.2 overs); Manjrekar 46

Indians won by 8 wickets
Umpires: K Norris & KJ Pye

15–18 February 2015
Scorecard

(home team) New South Wales	v	Victoria
206 (86.2 overs); NJ Maddinson 49 (116); PM Siddle 2/37 (19 overs)		114 (50.1 overs); MP Stoinis 64 (138); SJN O'Keefe 4/46 (18.1 overs)
233 (47.3 overs); NJ Maddinson 93 (85); SM Boland 3/41 (10 overs)		169 (67.3 overs); PSP Handscomb 66 (167); SJN O'Keefe 4/40 (18 overs)

New South Wales won by 156 runs
Robertson Oval, Wagga Wagga
Umpires: Mick Martell and Phillip Gillespie
Player of the match: SJN O'Keefe (NSW)

- New South Wales won the toss and elected to bat
- Doug Bollinger (NSW) took a hat-trick in Victoria's first innings dismissing Peter Siddle, Chris Tremain and Scott Boland in consecutive deliveries
