= Harry Lampe =

Australian rules footballer

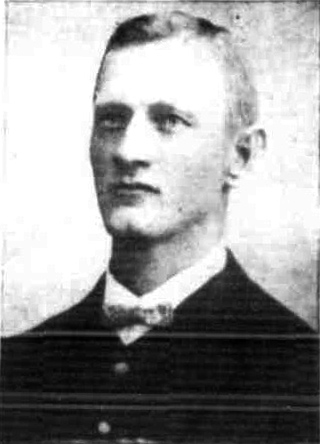

Personal information
- Full name: Henry Dedrich Lampe
- Born: 14 September 1874; Wagga Wagga, New South Wales
- Died: 25 August 1939 (aged 64); Wagga Wagga, New South Wales
- Original team: Wagga Wagga
- Positions: Forward, defender

Playing career^{1}
Years	Club	Games (Goals)
1899–1907	South Melbourne	135 (57)
- ^{1} Playing statistics correct to the end of 1907.

Career highlights
- South Melbourne leading goalkicker 1900, 1901

Henry Dedrich "Harry" Lampe (14 September 1874 – 25 August 1939) was an Australian rules footballer who played with the South Melbourne Football Club in the Victorian Football League (VFL). Originally from Wagga Wagga, he was considered one of the best Australian rules footballers from New South Wales.

== Football ==
Lampe started out as a forward and kicked two of South Melbourne's three goals in their 1899 VFL Grand Final loss to Fitzroy. During the next two seasons he was his club's main attacking weapon and topped their goal-kicking with 16 goals in 1900 and 20 goals in 1901. He finished his career as a defender with his last game coming in the Swans 1907 VFL Grand Final loss to Carlton.

In 1909, Lampe worked as a VFL boundary umpire for six games and appeared once as a field umpire. He later moved back to Wagga Wagga and continued to play football until the age of 52. It was claimed that he played matches for 36 consecutive years. After finally retiring from football, Lampe played bowls.

His son Bill also played football and represented New South Wales in first-class cricket.
