= Charlie Goding =

Australian rules footballer (1876–1926)

Personal information
- Full name: Charles Alfred Goding
- Born: 3 August 1876; Melbourne
- Died: 5 September 1926 (aged 50); Caulfield, Victoria

Playing career^{1}
Years	Club	Games (Goals)
1897	Melbourne	4 (1)
1899–1904	South Melbourne	63 (60)
Total		67 (61)
- ^{1} Playing statistics correct to the end of 1904.

Charles Alfred Goding (3 August 1876 – 5 September 1926) was an Australian rules footballer who played with Melbourne and South Melbourne in the Victorian Football League (VFL).

Goding started his VFL career at Melbourne, for the inaugural league season in 1897. He joined South Melbourne in 1899 and was a centre half-back in their team which lost that year's grand final. From 1901 he played as a forward. In his first season up forward he kicked 19 goals, finishing one goal behind Harry Lampe in the South Melbourne goal-kicking. He equaled that tally in 1902 and kicked another 10 goals in 1903, winning the club's goal-kicking award on each occasion.

His sole representative match came in 1901, when he appeared for the VFL against South Australia.

He also played for Essendon Association in the Victorian Football Association, after leaving South Melbourne.
