= Ron Hillis =

Australian rules footballer, born 1906

Personal information
- Born: 19 February 1906
- Died: 6 December 1976 (aged 70)
- Original team: Middle Park
- Height: 183 cm (6 ft 0 in)
- Weight: 82 kg (181 lb)

Playing career^{1}
| Years | Club | Games (Goals) |
| 1929–1937 | South Melbourne | 137 (16) |
- ^{1} Playing statistics correct to the end of 1937.

Ron Hillis (19 February 1906 – 6 December 1976) was an Australian rules footballer who played with South Melbourne in the VFL during the 1930s.

A full back, Hillis was a Best and Fairest award winner with South Melbourne in 1930 and 1935. He was also a 4 time VFL representative at interstate football. Despite playing 19 games during the 1933 season, injury prevented him from being a member of their premiership side that year.
