= Jim Dorgan =

Australian rules footballer

Personal information
- Full name: James Anthony Dorgan
- Born: 26 November 1930
- Died: 30 January 2003 (aged 72)
- Original team: Williamstown (VFA)
- Height: 173 cm (5 ft 8 in)
- Weight: 73 kg (161 lb)

Playing career^{1}
Years	Club	Games (Goals)
1951–1958	South Melbourne	102 (2)
- ^{1} Playing statistics correct to the end of 1958.

James Anthony Dorgan (26 November 1930 – 30 January 2003) was an Australian rules footballer who played with South Melbourne in the VFL during the 1950s.

Dorgan played in the back pocket and had his best season in 1956 where he won South Melbourne's Best and Fairest award as well as finishing 3rd in the Brownlow Medal.

For many years, Dorgan was officially credited with playing three games for Melbourne in 1949, but in 2018 these were correctly reassigned to his brother Jack Dorgan. A third brother, Frank, was a premiership winning coach of the Williamstown Rovers.

== Bibliography ==
- Spaull, Roger, "The Dashing Defender of the Lake Oval", The Footy Almanac, 6 December 2022
