= Paul Williams (Australian rules footballer) =

Australian rules footballer (born 1973)

Personal information
- Full name: Paul Williams
- Born: 3 April 1973 (age 53)
- Original team: North Hobart (TFL)
- Draft: No. 70, 1989 National draft, Collingwood
- Height: 177 cm (5 ft 10 in)
- Weight: 83 kg (183 lb)
- Position: Utility

Playing career^{1}
| Years | Club | Games (Goals) |
| 1991–2000 | Collingwood | 189 (223) |
| 2001–2006 | Sydney | 117 (84) |
| Total | | 306 (307) |

Coaching career^{3}
| Years | Club | Games (W–L–D) |
| 2011 | Western Bulldogs | 3 (2–1–0) |
- ^{1} Playing statistics correct to the end of 2006.^{3} Coaching statistics correct as of 2011.

Career highlights
- AFL Premiership player: (2005); 2× Bob Skilton Medal: (2001, 2002); All-Australian team: (2003); Larke Medal: (1990); Harry Collier Trophy 1991; Wrecker Award 1991; Tasmanian Team of the Century

Paul Williams (born 3 April 1973) is a former Australian rules footballer who played for the Collingwood Football Club and the Sydney Swans in the Australian Football League (AFL). He is also a former assistant coach in the AFL, which most notably included a brief period as caretaker coach of the Western Bulldogs towards the end of the 2011 season.

== Playing career ==
=== Collingwood Football Club ===
Williams began his AFL career with Collingwood Football Club, joining them from Tasmanian club North Hobart. Playing in a number of positions ranging from half back to half forward, the tough-tackling Williams was a regular in the mostly unsuccessful Collingwood side of the late 1990s, racking up 189 games and kicking 223 goals (his best being 6 against Carlton in 1996).

=== Sydney Swans ===
However, at the end of the 2000 season, he was traded to Sydney Swans for two draft picks. There, he immediately made an impact, winning two consecutive Bob Skilton Medals in 2001 and 2002, as well as being selected in the All-Australian team of 2003.

In 2005, Williams played in the Swans' premiership side. In doing so, he established an AFL record for most matches played by a player before being in a premiership side, with the Grand Final having been his 294th game. Shane Crawford surpassed this record in 2008.

On 13 May 2006 against Richmond at the Telstra Dome (now known as Marvel Stadium), Williams became the 45th player to play 300 VFL/AFL games. The Swans won this match by 118 points, setting a record for the biggest winning margin in a match featuring a player playing his 300th VFL/AFL game.

=== Retirement ===
On 21 June 2006, Williams announced he would be retiring at the end of the 2006 premiership season, which was his 16th at AFL level (and 6th with Sydney). Reasons cited for his retirement were the fact that his family was based in Melbourne, and that more opportunities for selection to younger players such as Tim Schmidt and Paul Bevan was important for the club.

On 11 July 2006, senior coach of Sydney Swans Paul Roos reported at a press conference that Williams was a chance to be rested for the forthcoming game against West Coast. Hours later, Williams announced his retirement, effective immediately due to surgery required on a broken collarbone, not seeing out his initial promise to retire at the end of the season.

== Coaching career ==
=== Melbourne Football Club ===
In 2007, Williams took up an assistant coaching role at the Melbourne Football Club, serving there for two years.

=== Western Bulldogs ===
In 2009, he moved into an assistant coaching role at the Western Bulldogs, and served there for three years. While at the Bulldogs, Williams served three matches as caretaker senior coach after Rodney Eade left the club before the end of the 2011 season. Williams' first match as caretaker senior coach of Bulldogs resulted in a 60-point win over bottom-of-the-ladder Port Adelaide. During this period, he coached his 2005 Sydney premiership teammate Barry Hall, who retired at season's end. Williams was however not retained as the Bulldogs senior coach at the conclusion of the 2011 season and was replaced by Brendan McCartney as the senior coach of the Western Bulldogs Football Club.

=== Carlton Football Club ===
Williams shifted to a midfield assistant coaching role at the Carlton Football Club in 2012 on a two-year contract, but was sacked after one unsuccessful season.

== Post-coaching career ==
Williams now sits on the AFL Tribunal jury, adjudicating on high-profile cases that arise during the regular season.

== Statistics ==
=== Playing statistics ===
Legend
| G | Goals | K | Kicks | D | Disposals | T | Tackles |
| B | Behinds | H | Handballs | M | Marks |

| Season | Team | No. | Games | Totals | | | | | | | Averages (per game) | | | | | | |
| Season | Team | No. | Games | G | B | K | H | D | M | T | G | B | K | H | D | M | T |
|---|---|---|---|---|---|---|---|---|---|---|---|---|---|---|---|---|---|
| 1991 | Collingwood | 37 | 19 | 19 | 21 | 207 | 104 | 311 | 51 | 47 | 1.0 | 1.1 | 10.9 | 5.5 | 16.4 | 2.7 | 2.5 |
| 1992 | Collingwood | 10 | 13 | 11 | 10 | 129 | 63 | 192 | 50 | 22 | 0.8 | 0.8 | 9.9 | 4.8 | 14.8 | 3.8 | 1.7 |
| 1993 | Collingwood | 10 | 20 | 16 | 16 | 198 | 121 | 319 | 61 | 54 | 0.8 | 0.8 | 9.9 | 6.1 | 16.0 | 3.1 | 2.7 |
| 1994 | Collingwood | 10 | 18 | 31 | 21 | 169 | 85 | 254 | 56 | 47 | 1.7 | 1.2 | 9.4 | 4.7 | 14.1 | 3.1 | 2.6 |
| 1995 | Collingwood | 10 | 22 | 30 | 22 | 306 | 107 | 413 | 88 | 56 | 1.4 | 1.0 | 13.9 | 4.9 | 18.8 | 4.0 | 2.5 |
| 1996 | Collingwood | 10 | 21 | 38 | 25 | 295 | 105 | 400 | 87 | 32 | 1.8 | 1.2 | 14.0 | 5.0 | 19.0 | 4.1 | 1.5 |
| 1997 | Collingwood | 10 | 22 | 28 | 23 | 332 | 163 | 495 | 99 | 46 | 1.3 | 1.0 | 15.1 | 7.4 | 22.5 | 4.5 | 2.1 |
| 1998 | Collingwood | 10 | 16 | 9 | 11 | 219 | 95 | 314 | 61 | 38 | 0.6 | 0.7 | 13.7 | 5.9 | 19.6 | 3.8 | 2.4 |
| 1999 | Collingwood | 10 | 17 | 14 | 9 | 206 | 98 | 304 | 46 | 17 | 0.8 | 0.5 | 12.1 | 5.8 | 17.9 | 2.7 | 1.0 |
| 2000 | Collingwood | 10 | 21 | 27 | 17 | 253 | 118 | 371 | 88 | 70 | 1.3 | 0.8 | 12.0 | 5.6 | 17.7 | 4.2 | 3.3 |
| 2001 | Sydney | 10 | 23 | 25 | 28 | 282 | 143 | 425 | 92 | 62 | 1.1 | 1.2 | 12.3 | 6.2 | 18.5 | 4.0 | 2.7 |
| 2002 | Sydney | 10 | 19 | 21 | 18 | 273 | 146 | 419 | 52 | 68 | 1.1 | 0.9 | 14.4 | 7.7 | 22.1 | 2.7 | 3.6 |
| 2003 | Sydney | 10 | 23 | 20 | 9 | 263 | 154 | 417 | 66 | 72 | 0.9 | 0.4 | 11.4 | 6.7 | 18.1 | 2.9 | 3.1 |
| 2004 | Sydney | 10 | 21 | 9 | 8 | 229 | 156 | 385 | 59 | 44 | 0.4 | 0.4 | 10.9 | 7.4 | 18.3 | 2.8 | 2.1 |
| 2005 | Sydney | 10 | 19 | 5 | 4 | 194 | 121 | 315 | 51 | 44 | 0.3 | 0.2 | 10.2 | 6.4 | 16.6 | 2.7 | 2.3 |
| 2006 | Sydney | 10 | 12 | 4 | 4 | 108 | 67 | 175 | 52 | 24 | 0.3 | 0.3 | 9.0 | 5.6 | 14.6 | 4.3 | 2.0 |
| Career | | | 306 | 307 | 246 | 3663 | 1846 | 5509 | 1059 | 743 | 1.0 | 0.8 | 12.0 | 6.0 | 18.0 | 3.5 | 2.4 |

=== Coaching statistics ===
Legend
| W | Wins | L | Losses | D | Draws | W% | Winning percentage | LP | Ladder position | LT | League teams |

| Season | Team | Games | W | L | D | W % | LP | LT |
|---|---|---|---|---|---|---|---|---|
| 2011 | Western Bulldogs | 3 | 2 | 1 | 0 | 66.7% | 10 | 18 |
| Career totals | | 3 | 2 | 1 | 0 | 66.7% | | |

== Honours and achievements ==
Brownlow Medal votes
| Season | Votes |
| 1991 | 3 |
| 1992 | 2 |
| 1993 | 4 |
| 1994 | 1 |
| 1995 | 6 |
| 1996 | 6 |
| 1997 | 10 |
| 1998 | 6 |
| 1999 | 2 |
| 2000 | 9 |
| 2001 | 3 |
| 2002 | 16 |
| 2003 | 8 |
| 2004 | 9 |
| 2005 | 4 |
| 2006 | 0 |
| Total | 89 |

Team

- AFL Premiership (Sydney): 2005

Individual

- Bob Skilton Medal (Sydney Swans/South Melbourne F.C. Best & Fairest): 2001, 2002
- All-Australian: 2003
- Harry Collier Trophy (Collingwood FC Best First Year Player Award): 1991
- Wrecker Award (Collingwood FC Leading Desire Indicator): 1991
- Larke Medal: 1990
- Tasmanian Team of the Century - Interchange
