= Jim Taylor (Australian footballer) =

Australian rules footballer

Personal information
- Full name: James Joseph Taylor
- Born: 6 January 1932; Melbourne
- Died: 18 April 2000 (aged 68); Royal Brisbane Hospital
- Original team: Caulfield Grammarians (VAFA)
- Debut: 16 July 1949, South Melbourne vs. St Kilda, at Junction Oval
- Height: 191 cm (6 ft 3 in)
- Weight: 87 kg (192 lb)

Playing career^{1}
Years	Club	Games (Goals)
1949–1954	South Melbourne	81 (26)
1955	Norwood	13
1956–1961	South Melbourne	72 (9)
- ^{1} Playing statistics correct to the end of 1961.

Career highlights
- Best and Fairest, South Melbourne (1953, 1957); Victorian interstate team 13 games; South Australian interstate team 4 games

James Joseph Taylor (6 January 1932 – 18 April 2000) was an Australian rules footballer who played with South Melbourne in the Victorian Football League (VFL) during the 1950s.

== Family ==
The son of James Edward Arthur Taylor (1884-1956), and Amy Linda Taylor (1899-1993), née Farnsworth, James Joseph Taylor was born on 6 January 1932.

He married Evelyn Ruth Stockton on 14 March 1953. They had two children: James Scott Taylor (b.1954) and Ross Stockton Taylor (b.1958).

== Junior career ==
=== Athletics ===
He was a successful schoolboy athlete who competed as both a sprinter and a high-jumper at Caulfield Grammar School.

At the 1947 Associated Grammar Schools Combined Athletics Meeting, Taylor won both the under-16 high-jump and the open high-jump — his winning jump in each event was 5 ft 5 in (1.65 m) — and, according to Wilkinson (1997, p. 151), he was part of the winning team in the under-16 4×220 yard relay.

At the 1948 A.G.S. Combined Sports he won the open high-jump, setting a new record of 5 ft 11 5/8 in (1.82 m), and won the open 100 yards (in 10.7 secs), which was an extraordinary feat, given that he had badly strained his ankle a week earlier, and had been unable to train at all for the five days prior to the competition. He also competed in the long-jump.

At 15 he had already cleared 6 ft 1 in (1.85 m) using a "scissors jump" technique. His best-ever jump was 6 ft 3 in (1.91 m). He eventually gave up high jumping because he became too heavy; and, in particular, because no up-to-date high jump coaching was available to him.

=== Football ===
He played in Caulfield Grammar's First XVIII; and, in 1949, he was recruited from the V.A.F.A. team Caulfield Grammarians.

== Senior career ==
Promoted from the Third XVIII, and then the Second XVIII, Taylor played his first senior match for South Melbourne, at 17, on 16 July 1949 (round 13) against St Kilda at the St Junction Oval. Playing as a forward pocket and in the second ruck, he kicked one goal and was one of South Melbourne's best players.

He played as both a defender (mainly centre-half back) and ruckman for South Melbourne, and was a regular for both Victoria and South Melbourne during the next decade.

He played 81 senior games with South Melbourne between 1949 and 1954.

In 1955, aged 23, he moved to Norwood in the South Australian National Football League. He played 13 S.A.F.L. games for Norwood, including the Grand Final, in which he was the best player for the losing team. He played four Interstate matches for South Australia in 1955.

He then returned to South Melbourne and played another 72 senior VFL matches from 1956 to 1961.

Taylor played in the first ruck in his first return match (round 1, 1956) against Geelong at the Lake Oval. The match against Geelong was a very low standard scrappy affair. Geelong won 11.11 (77) to 7.8 (50), and Taylor was one of South Melbourne's best players (on one occasion he took a spectacular diving one-handed mark, with his left hand). Taylor came off the ground after the match only to be told that his father, who had served as vice-president of the South Melbourne Football Club from 1952 to 1954, had died in the committee reserve whilst the match was in progress, and that his mother had requested that he not be told until after the match was over.

He represented Victoria at interstate football 13 occasions.

In 1973 he was chairman of selectors at South Melbourne.

== Awards ==
He was South Melbourne's Best and Fairest player in 1953 and 1957.

In 1957 he was fourth in the Brownlow Medal, and in 1961, his final VFL season, he finished equal fifth, in a year he played only 12 games

== See also ==
- List of Caulfield Grammar School people
