= David Ackerly =

Australian rules footballer

Personal information
- Born: 27 November 1960 (age 65)
- Height: 178 cm (5 ft 10 in)
- Weight: 81 kg (179 lb)

Playing career^{1}
Years	Club	Games (Goals)
1979–1985	South Melbourne/Sydney	138 (12)
1986–1989	North Melbourne	53 (5)
Total		191 (17)
- ^{1} Playing statistics correct to the end of 1989.

David Ackerly (born 27 November 1960) is a former Australian rules footballer who played with South Melbourne and North Melbourne in the VFL during the 1980s.

Ackerly played in the back pocket and was South Melbourne's best and fairest in 1980 and 1982.

In 1991 and 1992, he played 36 games and kicked 3 goals for Williamstown in the Victorian Football Association including the losing 1992 grand final against Sandringham at Carlton. He finished in third place in the Club best and fairest in 1991, won the most consistent player award and also the Ron James MVP. Ackerley was assistant coach in 1992.

He is currently employed as an assistant coach of football at Wesley College, Melbourne.
