= Isaac Heeney =

Australian rules footballer (born 1996)

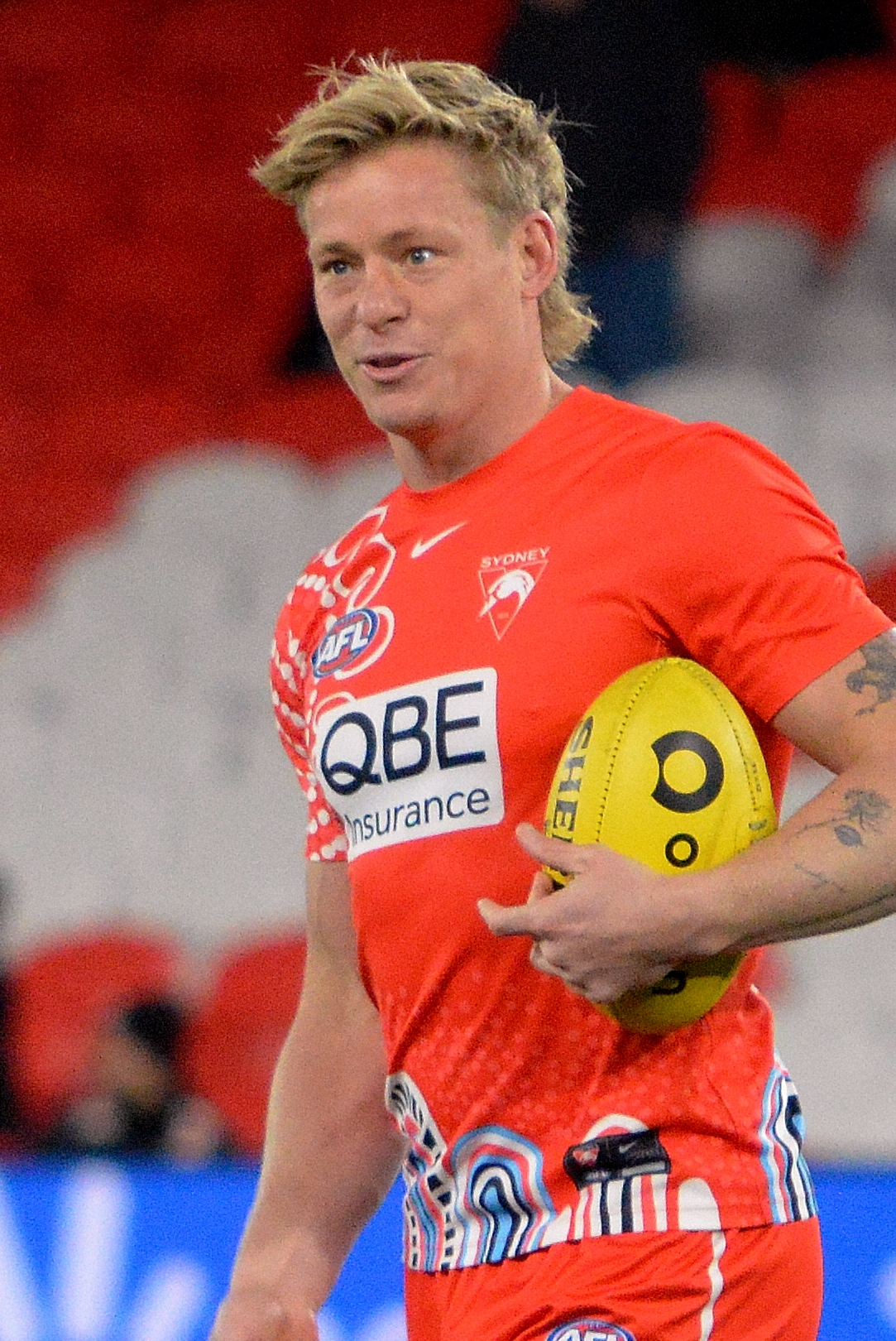
- Heeney in August 2026

Personal information
- Full name: Isaac Heeney
- Nickname: Heens
- Born: 5 May 1996 (age 30); Maitland, New South Wales
- Original team: Cardiff Hawks (BDAFL)/Sydney Swans (NEAFL)
- Draft: No. 18, 2014 national draft
- Height: 185 cm (6 ft 1 in)
- Weight: 88 kg (194 lb)
- Position: Midfielder

Club information
- Current club: Sydney
- Number: 5

Playing career^{1}
Years	Club	Games (Goals)
2015–	Sydney	244 (330)
- ^{1} Playing statistics correct to the end of round 23, 2026.

Career highlights
- 3x All-Australian: 2022, 2024, 2025; 3x Bob Skilton Medal: 2024, 2025, 2026; Sydney leading goalkicker: 2025; 2× 22under22 team: 2017, 2018; AFL Mark of the Year: 2018; AFLPA Best First Year Player: 2015; AFLCA Best Young Player: 2016; AFL Rising Star nominee: 2015; 3x Goodes-O'Loughlin Medal: 2018, 2021, 2025

Isaac Heeney (born 5 May 1996) is an Australian rules footballer who plays for the Sydney Swans in the Australian Football League (AFL).

== Early life ==
Heeney was born in Maitland, New South Wales, to mother Rochelle and father Adam. He grew up in the Hunter Region. He received primary level education at Black Hill Public School in Black Hill. He then attended All Saints College. He began playing soccer at the age of 7 and managed to kick 68 goals in 12 games. Shortly after, he picked up a cricket bat and played an age level above his own. He had a batting average of 216. He also travelled with his school to compete in a Sydney rugby league tournament and scored five tries in his team's grand final victory.

Heeney played his junior football for the Cardiff Hawks in the Black Diamond Australian Football League. A highly rated junior player, he joined the Sydney Swans Academy at the age of 12 years. He moved to Sydney for his draft year, completing his final year of school at Waverley College; he lived with a host family in South Coogee and played in the NEAFL for the Swans reserves team.

Heeney later revealed he was the only student throughout his entire schooling that played Australian rules football and would have quit in favour of rugby league had the Swans Academy not existed. He grew up supporting the Swans and idolised Ryan O'Keefe as a child. Heeney is also an avid fan of the National Rugby League and supports the Sydney Roosters club.

== AFL career ==
Heeney was selected by the Swans in the 2014 AFL draft. His selection was controversial in that the Melbourne Football Club bid their first selection, number 2 overall, for Heeney but under drafting rules at the time, the Swans were able to match with their first selection, which was 18th overall. As a result of this, and the similar round-based bidding process used for father–son rule selections, the draft criteria were changed to a points-based system to provide for a more equitable outcome.

Heeney made his debut for Sydney at ANZ Stadium against Essendon in round 1 of the 2015 season. He kicked his first AFL goal, which was also the match-winning goal and last in the match, late in the final quarter as the Swans came from 41 points down in the third quarter to win by 12 points. Following a four-goal performance at the Sydney Cricket Ground in round 3, Heeney picked up an AFL Rising Star nomination as the Swans got off to an unbeaten start in the 2015 season. After a promising start to his season, Heeney suffered a knee injury in round 6. He returned to the team in round 17, kicking 2 goals and having an instant impact on the team. Heeney played out the remainder of the season, including in the team's finals games. He was named as the Sydney Swans' rising star after kicking 16 goals and averaging 12.6 disposals.

Heeney had a successful 2016 AFL season, playing every game except for rounds 16 and 17. Heeney set a new personal record for disposals in the opening round, collecting 23. He had a breakout game in round 4, kicking four important goals and collecting 18 disposals and being named as one of Sydney's best on ground. He had one of the best games in his career in round 7, where he kicked a bag of 5, his highest goal tally to that point. He received 3 Brownlow votes for his performance. Heeney remained in the team throughout the first half of the season, posing a consistent threat up forward. In round 13, the Swans beat Melbourne, simultaneously helping to break the record for most tackles ever laid by a team in a single match. Of these 155 tackles, Heeney laid the second-most with 13. Despite this, he only gathered 6 possessions, followed by 4 in the following game. Subsequently, Heeney was rested between rounds 16 and 17, before returning to the team. In the 2016 finals series, Heeney was instrumental in both the semi-final (32 possessions, 1 goal) and preliminary final (28 possessions, 7 tackles). He played in the 2016 AFL Grand Final, which the Swans lost by 22 points to the Western Bulldogs.

Heeney suffered a season-ending injury in the Swans' 8-point loss to Richmond in the 6th round of the 2020 AFL season, after dislocating and rupturing his medial ligament in his right ankle. He had surgery soon after which kept him confined to a moon boot for a few weeks after the completion of the surgery. He also underwent stem cell treatment to help with the healing of his cartilage that had been removed during the operation.

=== 2024 season ===
After a strong start to the season, Heeney was considered a favourite for the Brownlow medal but was then controversially suspended. Some thought he may poll the most votes and be an ineligible winner, but he finished in equal fourth.

==== Qualifying final mark ====
In GWS's 2024 qualifying final against Sydney, Heeney took what many to be considered Mark of the Year with a high-flying specky over Jack Buckley, although Heeney was ineligible for the award due to it being in a finals match, a fact that attracted criticism in the press. In any case, Buckley received widespread respect and acclaim for his act of sportsmanship for holding Heeney's hand to ensure his fall was safe, as Heeney was otherwise falling head-first and could have suffered a severe injury had Buckley not intervened. Among the many that praised Buckley's quick thinking, Heeney's own mother public thanked Buckley on Facebook. He also scored the second-last goal of the game, levelling the scores. This was a crucial moment which helped push the team to victory, with Joel Amartey scoring the match-winning goal. Heeney later said that the game was “as loud as [he’d] heard the SCG.”

=== 2026 season ===
Heeney's 2026 season drew praise for his versatility and has placed him in Brownlow Medal contention. After the Swans defeated the Gold Coast Suns at Gather Round in Adelaide, The Courier described Heeney as one of the AFL’s most complete players.

On 19 August 2026, Heeney was one of five Sydney players suspended by the club for the remainder of the 2026 AFL season after an incident inside a hotel room in Melbourne. A report of sexual assault was made by a woman who was in the hotel room, although it has not been suggested in media reports that any of the players are being accused of sexual assault.

He won his third consecutive Bob Skilton Medal, but was absent from the ceremony due to the ongoing case of the hotel room incident.

== Statistics ==
Updated to the end of round 22, 2026.

Legend
G	Goals	K	Kicks	D	Disposals	T	Tackles
B	Behinds	H	Handballs	M	Marks

Season	Team	No.	Games	Totals							Averages (per game)							Votes
Season	Team	No.	Games	G	B	K	H	D	M	T	G	B	K	H	D	M	T	Votes
2015	Sydney	5	14	16	10	120	57	177	67	44	1.1	0.7	8.6	4.1	12.6	4.8	3.1	2
2016	Sydney	5	24	28	15	218	180	398	113	92	1.2	0.6	9.1	7.5	16.6	4.7	3.8	5
2017	Sydney	5	20	16	13	250	161	411	100	95	0.8	0.7	12.5	8.1	20.6	5.0	4.8	4
2018	Sydney	5	22	19	14	248	200	448	99	111	0.9	0.6	11.3	9.1	20.4	4.5	5.0	7
2019	Sydney	5	22	26	15	237	204	441	126	85	1.2	0.7	10.8	9.3	20.0	5.7	3.9	6
2020 (Note: The 2020 season was played with 17 home-and-away matches per team (down from 22) and 16-minute quarters with time on (down from 20-minute quarters with time on) due to the impact of the COVID-19 pandemic.)	Sydney	5	6	7	7	53	33	86	29	15	1.2	1.2	8.8	5.5	14.3	4.8	2.5	5
2021	Sydney	5	21	36	21	222	111	333	119	41	1.7	1.0	10.6	5.3	15.9	5.7	2.0	8
2022	Sydney	5	25	49	28	251	159	410	117	118	2.0	1.1	10.0	6.4	16.4	4.7	4.7	7
2023	Sydney	5	23	30	19	214	143	357	110	99	1.3	0.8	9.3	6.2	15.5	4.8	4.3	2
2024	Sydney	5	24	34	20	328	274	602	108	113	1.4	0.8	13.7	11.4	25.1	4.5	4.7	28
2025	Sydney	5	23	37	21	298	244	542	87	88	1.6	0.9	13.0	10.6	23.6	3.8	3.8	17
2026	Sydney	5	19	29	12	244	265	509	60	91	1.5	0.6	12.8	13.9	26.8	3.2	4.8	0
Career			243	327	195	2683	2031	4714	1135	992	1.3	0.8	11.0	8.4	19.4	4.7	4.1	91

== Honours and achievements ==
Team

- Minor Premiership (Sydney): 2016, 2024
- McClelland Trophy (Sydney): 2016, 2026

Individual

- 3× Bob Skilton Medal: 2024, 2025, 2026
- 3x All-Australian team: 2022, 2024, 2025
- 2× 22under22 team: 2017, 2018
- AFL Mark of the Year: 2018
- AFLPA Best First Year Player: 2015
- AFLCA Best Young Player: 2016
- AFL Rising Star nominee: 2015 (round 3)
