= Bill Williams (Australian footballer) =

Australian rules footballer

- 1948 cigarette card of Williams

Personal information
- Full name: William Williams
- Born: 13 September 1925
- Died: 7 July 2016 (aged 90)
- Original team: Spotswood (FDFL)
- Height: 168 cm (5 ft 6 in)
- Weight: 67 kg (148 lb)
- Position: Rover

Playing career^{1}
Years	Club	Games (Goals)
1945–1951	South Melbourne	124 (180)
- ^{1} Playing statistics correct to the end of 1951.

William Williams (13 September 1925 – 7 July 2016) was an Australian rules footballer who played with South Melbourne in the Victorian Football League (VFL) during the late 1940s.

A rover, Williams won the best and fairest award for South in 1946, 1947 and 1950. A handy goalkicker, he twice topped their season ending list for goals.

He joined Williamstown as captain-coach in 1952.

In 2003 he was named on the interchange bench in the club's official Team of the Century.

Williams died 7 July 2016 aged 90.
