= Ted Johnson (footballer, born 1901) =

Australian rules footballer (1901–1970)

Personal information
- Born: 12 November 1901
- Died: 21 April 1970 (aged 68)
- Original team: Leopold
- Height: 178 cm (5 ft 10 in)
- Weight: 78 kg (172 lb)

Playing career^{1}
Years	Club	Games (Goals)
1923–1931	South Melbourne	136 (385)
- ^{1} Playing statistics correct to the end of 1931.

Edward Johnson (12 November 1901 – 21 April 1970) was an Australian rules footballer who played with South Melbourne in the VFL during the 1920s. He was a key position forward and represented Victoria at interstate football.

== Football ==
From his debut in 1923 he topped the club's goalkicking for six successive seasons. From 1924 to 1928 he kicked 50 goals in a season with the exception of 1926 when he kicked 45 goals. His best tally in those years was 60 goals and he achieved that three times without being able to go over.

=== Place-kicks ===
Johnson favoured punting over place-kicking, after infamously kicking only two goals from 14 place kicks in the match, against Melbourne, at the Melbourne Cricket Ground, on 24 May 1924.
