= Jake Lloyd (footballer) =

Australian rules footballer

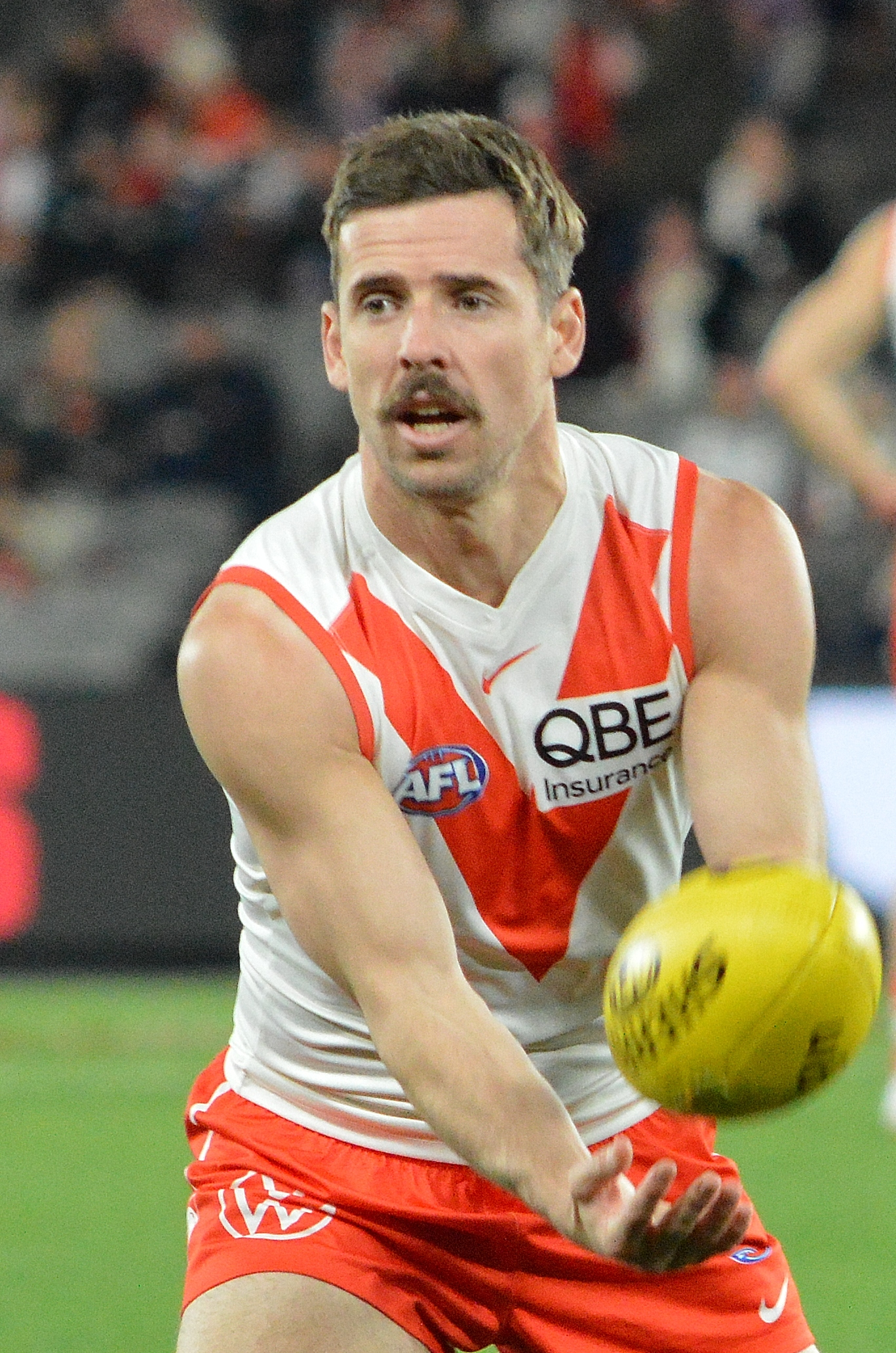
- Lloyd in August 2026

Personal information
- Born: 20 September 1993 (age 33); Horsham, Victoria
- Original team: North Ballarat Rebels
- Draft: No. 16, 2013 Rookie Draft, Sydney
- Height: 182 cm (6 ft 0 in)
- Weight: 80 kg (176 lb)
- Position: Defender

Club information
- Current club: Sydney
- Number: 44

Playing career^{1}
Years	Club	Games (Goals)
2014–	Sydney	296 (67)

Representative team honours
Years	Team	Games (Goals)
2020	Victoria	1 (0)
- ^{1} Playing statistics correct to the end of the 2026 season.

Career highlights
- 2× Bob Skilton Medal: 2018, 2020; 2× Adam Goodes Trophy: 2017, 2021; AFL Rising Star nominee: 2014

Jake Lloyd (born 20 September 1993) is an Australian rules footballer who plays for the Sydney Swans in the Australian Football League (AFL).

== Early career ==
Lloyd grew up in Horsham, Victoria and won four straight senior flags with his home club the Horsham Demons, the first of which came when he was a 16-year-old. Lloyd was good enough to play for Victoria Country at under-16s and under-18s level, and won a gold medal at the national championships. He later played for the North Ballarat Rebels in the TAC Cup. Lloyd was drafted by the Swans in the 2013 Rookie Draft. He secured a premiership medallion playing in the NEAFL for the club's reserves in 2013 and was named in the NEAFL team of the year.

== AFL career ==
In April 2014, Lloyd was elevated from the Swans' rookie list and made his AFL debut against Fremantle. On 18 August, he received the round 21 nomination for the AFL Rising Star Award. On 27 September, he participated in the 2014 AFL Grand Final, a match the Swans lost 137–74 to Hawthorn. Two years later, he participated in the 2016 AFL Grand Final, a match the Swans lost 89–67 to the Western Bulldogs.

Between 2016 and 2019, Lloyd placed in the top ten in the AFL for kicks in each of the four seasons. In 2017 he was runner-up in the Bob Skilton Medal, capping his rise by winning the award twice in 2018 and 2020, along with earning recognition in the 40-man All-Australian squad in 2018. Also in 2018, he became the fastest Sydney Swans player and equal-third fastest in VFL/AFL history to reach 100 games. Following speculation linking him with a move to the Gold Coast Suns, he re-signed with the Swans for a further four seasons in September 2018.

In February 2020, Lloyd represented Victoria in the AFL State of Origin for Bushfire Relief.

On August 29, 2020, Lloyd became the fastest Sydney Swan to reach 150 AFL games. He brought up the milestone in a 26-point loss to Port Adelaide at the Adelaide Oval.

== Statistics ==
Updated to the end of round 22, 2026.

Legend
G	Goals	K	Kicks	D	Disposals	T	Tackles
B	Behinds	H	Handballs	M	Marks
†	Led the league for the season

Season	Team	No.	Games	Totals							Averages (per game)							Votes
Season	Team	No.	Games	G	B	K	H	D	M	T	G	B	K	H	D	M	T	Votes
2013	Sydney	44	0	—	—	—	—	—	—	—	—	—	—	—	—	—	—	0
2014	Sydney	44	21	8	5	163	157	320	90	57	0.4	0.2	7.8	7.5	15.2	4.3	2.7	0
2015	Sydney	44	22	3	4	248	197	445	96	49	0.1	0.2	11.3	9.0	20.2	4.4	2.2	0
2016	Sydney	44	26	6	3	390	244	634	105	59	0.2	0.1	15.0	9.4	24.4	4.0	2.3	0
2017	Sydney	44	23	6	4	370	227	597	136	34	0.3	0.2	16.1	9.9	26.0	5.9	1.5	2
2018	Sydney	44	23	3	3	420	219	639	149	37	0.1	0.1	18.3^{†}	9.5	27.8	6.5	1.6	6
2019	Sydney	44	22	3	4	431	246	677	137	37	0.1	0.2	19.6	11.2	30.8	6.2	1.7	3
2020 (Note: The 2020 season was played with 17 home-and-away matches per team (down from 22) and 16-minute quarters with time on (down from 20-minute quarters with time on) due to the impact of the COVID-19 pandemic.)	Sydney	44	17	1	0	284	155	439	81	38	0.1	0.0	16.7^{†}	9.1	25.8	4.8	2.2	3
2021	Sydney	44	22	1	1	404	210	614	124	40	0.0	0.0	18.4	9.5	27.9	5.6	1.8	2
2022	Sydney	44	24	2	0	385	185	570	143	56	0.1	0.0	16.0	7.7	23.8	6.0	2.3	1
2023	Sydney	44	23	3	1	372	163	535	138	54	0.1	0.0	16.2	7.1	23.3	6.0	2.3	0
2024	Sydney	44	26	6	3	320	192	512	166	47	0.2	0.1	12.3	7.4	19.7	6.4	1.8	0
2025	Sydney	44	22	7	12	277	164	441	157	47	0.3	0.5	12.6	7.5	20.0	7.1	2.1	0
2026	Sydney	44	21	15	8	195	156	351	90	44	0.7	0.4	9.3	7.4	16.7	4.3	2.1	0
Career			292	64	48	4259	2515	6774	1612	599	0.2	0.2	14.6	8.6	23.2	5.5	2.1	17

== Honours and achievements ==
Team

- 3x Minor Premiership (Sydney): 2014, 2016, 2024

Individual

- 2× Bob Skilton Medal: 2018, 2020
- Victoria representative honours in State of Origin for Bushfire Relief Match: 2020
- AFL Rising Star nominee: 2014 (round 21)
