= Harry Mears =

Australian rules footballer

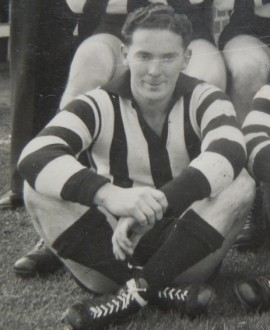
- Mears during his Collingwood career

Personal information
- Full name: Harry Mears
- Born: 30 April 1922
- Died: 30 March 1999 (aged 76)
- Original team: Alphington Amateurs
- Height: 168 cm (5 ft 6 in)
- Weight: 72 kg (159 lb)

Playing career^{1}
Years	Club	Games (Goals)
1940–1946	Collingwood	62 (61)
1946–1948	South Melbourne	35 (47)
Total		97 (108)
- ^{1} Playing statistics correct to the end of 1948.

Harry Mears (30 April 1922 – 30 March 1999) was an Australian rules footballer who played with Collingwood and South Melbourne in the Victorian Football League (VFL).

A rover, Mears made his way into the Collingwood team from the league seconds. Mears played 19 games for Collingwood in the 1945 VFL season, but usually started on the bench, so he transferred to South Melbourne in 1946, seeking greater opportunities. He had a strong first season at South Melbourne in 1946, finishing as their leading goal-kicker with 32 goals. He also polled 11 Brownlow Medal votes, the most by a South Melbourne player. Mears spent two more seasons at the club and then joined Mortlake in the Hampden Football League, as coach.
