= Len Thomas =

Australian rules footballer and coach

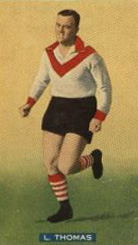

Personal information
- Born: 20 July 1908; South Melbourne, Victoria
- Died: 17 August 1943 (aged 35); Salamaua, Territory of New Guinea
- Height: 179 cm (5 ft 10 in)
- Weight: 80 kg (176 lb)

Playing career^{1}
Years	Club	Games (Goals)
1927–1938	South Melbourne	187 (54)
1939	Hawthorn	16 (15)
1940	North Melbourne	6 (9)
Total		209 (78)

Coaching career
Years	Club	Games (W–L–D)
1939	Hawthorn	18 (5–12–1)
1940	North Melbourne	7 (2–5–0)
Total		25 (7–17–1)
- ^{1} Playing statistics correct to the end of 1940.

Len Thomas (20 July 1908 – 17 August 1943) was an Australian rules footballer who played 187 games with South Melbourne in the Victorian Football League (VFL), before finishing his career as captain-coach at both Hawthorn and North Melbourne. He was the son of South Melbourne player William Thomas.

== Football career ==
Thomas made his debut for South Melbourne in 1927 and went on to become one of their better players during the 1930s. He won the club's Best and Fairest award in 1931 and 1938. A premiership player in 1933, he played through the centre in their Grand Final victory over Richmond.

In 1939 he moved to Hawthorn where he had accepted the role of captain-coach and the club finished tenth. The following season he crossed to North Melbourne with the same leadership role. Seven games into the 1940 season Thomas decided to enlist in order to take up military service. That left Jim Adamson to take charge for the rest of the season.

== Military career ==
Although Thomas had attained the rank of Corporal, upon his evacuation from the Middle East in September 1941 he requested that he be allowed to revert to the rank of Private, so that he could serve as a commando. His request was granted. He served with the 2/3rd Independent (Commando) Company, Second A.I.F.

He became the most experienced VFL footballer to be killed in war^{[a]} when he lost his life fighting the Japanese in New Guinea in 1943. He was wounded in the leg during fighting and spent time in hospital, only to be killed when the Japanese pushed the town of Salamaua.

== See also ==
- List of Victorian Football League players who died on active service

== Notes ==
^{a} East Fremantle's "Hooky" Doig, a member of that famous football family, played 225 games for Old Easts – sixteen more than Thomas – between 1899 and 1912 before being killed in World War I at the age of forty.
