= Eddie Lane =

Australian rules footballer (1929–2018)

Personal information
- Full name: Esmond James Lane
- Born: 25 June 1929
- Died: 28 May 2018 (aged 88)
- Original team: South Districts
- Height: 168 cm (5 ft 6 in)
- Weight: 66 kg (146 lb)

Playing career^{1}
| Years | Club | Games (Goals) |
| 1951–1956 | South Melbourne | 96 (130) |
- ^{1} Playing statistics correct to the end of 1956.

Esmond James Lane (25 June 1929 – 28 May 2018) was an Australian rules footballer who played with South Melbourne in the VFL during the 1950s.

Lane was a 168 centimetres (5 ft 6 in) rover and handy goalkicker. His best season came in 1954 when he won the South Melbourne Best and Fairest award and finished equal third in the Brownlow Medal. He topped the club's goal kicking in both 1954 and 1955.
