= William Lampe =

Australian cricketer

Personal information
- Born: 29 August 1902; Wagga Wagga, Australia
- Died: 22 December 1987 (aged 85); Wagga Wagga, Australia
- Source: ESPNcricinfo, 4 January 2017

William Lampe (29 August 1902 – 22 December 1987) was an Australian cricketer. He played two first-class matches for New South Wales between 1927/28 and 1928/29.

== See also ==
- List of New South Wales representative cricketers
