= Bob Skilton Medal =

Honor awarded to Australian rules football players

The Bob Skilton Medal is an annual Australian rules football award presented to the player(s) adjudged the best and fairest at the Sydney Swans (formerly the South Melbourne Football Club) throughout the Victorian Football League/Australian Football League (VFL/AFL) season. It is named after Bob Skilton, who won the award a record nine times from 1958 to 1968. The voting system, as of the 2017 AFL season, involves five coaches giving an undetermined number of players up to ten votes each after every match. Players can receive a maximum of 50 votes for a game.

== Recipients ==
^	Denotes current player
+	Player won Brownlow Medal in same season

Season	Recipient(s)	Ref.
1927	Hec McKay	
1928	Charlie Stanbridge	
1929	Danny Wheelahan	
1930	Ron Hillis	
1931	Len Thomas	
1932	Bill Faul	
1933	Harry Clarke	
1934	Terry Brain	
1935	Ron Hillis (2)	
1936	Herbie Matthews	
1937	Herbie Matthews (2)	
1938	Len Thomas (2)	
1939	Herbie Matthews (3)	
1940	Herbie Matthews+ (4)	
1941	Rex Ritchie	
1942	Jim Cleary	
1943	Herbie Matthews (5)	
1944	Jim Cleary (2)	
1945	Jack Graham	
1946	Bill Williams	
1947	Bill Williams (2)	
1948	Ron Clegg	
1949	Ron Clegg+ (2)	
1950	Bill Williams (3)	
1951	Ron Clegg (3)	
1952	Keith Schaefer	
1953	Jim Taylor	
1954	Eddie Lane	
1955	Ian Gillett	
1956	Jim Dorgan	
1957	Jim Taylor (2)	
1958	Bob Skilton	
1959	Bob Skilton+ (2)	
1960	Frank Johnson	
1961	Bob Skilton (3)	
1962	Bob Skilton (4)	
1963	Bob Skilton+ (5)	
1964	Bob Skilton (6)	
1965	Bob Skilton (7)	
1966	Max Papley	
1967	Bob Skilton (8)	
1968	Bob Skilton+ (9)	
1969	Peter Bedford	
1970	Peter Bedford+ (2)	
1971	Peter Bedford (3)	
1972	Russell Cook	
1973	Peter Bedford (4)	
1974	Norm Goss	
1975	Peter Bedford (5)	
1976	Rick Quade	
1977	Graham Teasdale+	
1978	John Murphy	
1979	Barry Round	
1980	David Ackerly	
1981	Barry Round+ (2)	
1982	David Ackerly (2)	
1983	Mark Browning	
1984	Bernie Evans	
1985	Stephen Wright	
1986	Gerard Healy	
1987	Gerard Healy (2)	
1988	Gerard Healy+ (3)	
1989	Mark Bayes	
1990	Stephen Wright (2)	
1991	Barry Mitchell	
1992	Paul Kelly	
1993	Paul Kelly (2)	
1994	Daryn Cresswell	
1995	Tony Lockett	
1996	Paul Kelly (3)	
1997	Paul Kelly (4)	
1998	Michael O'Loughlin	
1999	Wayne Schwass	
2000	Andrew Schauble	
2001	Paul Williams	
2002	Paul Williams (2)	
2003	Adam Goodes+	
2004	Barry Hall	
2005	Brett Kirk	
2006	Adam Goodes+ (2)	
2007	Brett Kirk (2)	
2008	Jarrad McVeigh	
2009	Ryan O'Keefe	
2010	Kieren Jack	
2011	Adam Goodes (3)	
2012	Josh Kennedy	
2013	Jarrad McVeigh (2)	
2014	Luke Parker	
2015	Josh Kennedy (2)	
2016	Josh Kennedy (3)	
2017	Luke Parker (2)	
2018	Jake Lloyd^	
2019	Dane Rampe^	
2020	Jake Lloyd^ (2)	
2021	Luke Parker (3)	
2022	Callum Mills^	
2023	Errol Gulden^	
2024	Isaac Heeney^	
2025	Isaac Heeney^ (2)	
2026	Isaac Heeney^ (3)	

== Multiple winners ==
^	Denotes current player

Player	Medals	Seasons
Bob Skilton	9	1958, 1959, 1961, 1962, 1963, 1964, 1965, 1967, 1968
Peter Bedford	5	1969, 1970, 1971, 1973, 1975
Herbie Matthews	5	1936, 1937, 1939, 1940, 1943
Paul Kelly	4	1992, 1993, 1996, 1997
Ron Clegg	3	1948, 1949, 1951
Adam Goodes	3	2003, 2006, 2011
Gerard Healy	3	1986, 1987, 1988
Josh Kennedy	3	2012, 2015, 2016
Luke Parker	3	2014, 2017, 2021
Bill Williams	3	1946, 1947, 1950
Isaac Heeney^	3	2024, 2025, 2026
David Ackerly	2	1980, 1982
Jim Cleary	2	1942, 1944
Ron Hillis	2	1930, 1935
Brett Kirk	2	2005, 2007
Jake Lloyd^	2	2018, 2020
Jarrad McVeigh	2	2008, 2013
Barry Round	2	1979, 1981
Jim Taylor	2	1953, 1957
Len Thomas	2	1931, 1938
Paul Williams	2	2001, 2002
Stephen Wright	2	1985, 1990
