= 2014 Essendon Football Club season =

Essendon Football Club
2014 season
- President: Paul Little
- Coach: Mark Thompson (1st season)
- Captains: Jobe Watson (5th season)
- Home ground: Docklands Stadium
- Highest home attendance: 74,664 vs Richmond (Round 11)
- Lowest home attendance: 30,948 vs Adelaide (Round 14)

The 2014 Essendon Football Club season was the club's 116th season in the Australian Football League (AFL).

== Squad ==
Essendon Football Club
Senior list		Rookie List	Coaching staff
1 Michael Hibberd; 2 Tom Bellchambers; 3 Paul Chapman; 4 Jobe Watson (c); 5 Brent Stanton; 6 Joe Daniher; 7 Leroy Jetta; 8 Jason Winderlich; 9 Brendon Goddard; 10 Nick O'Brien; 11 David Zaharakis; 12 Mark Baguley; 14 Jason Ashby; 15 Courtenay Dempsey; 16 Tayte Pears; 17 Jake Melksham; 18 Michael Hurley; 19 Shaun Edwards; 20 Jackson Merrett; 21 Dyson Heppell	22 Jake Carlisle; 23 David Myers; 24 Alex Browne; 26 Cale Hooker; 27 Zach Merrett; 28 Elliott Kavanagh; 30 Paddy Ryder; 31 Dustin Fletcher (vet); 32 Travis Colyer; 33 Dylan Van Unen; 34 Kyle Hardingham; 35 Martin Gleeson; 36 Lauchlan Dalgleish; 37 Sean Gregory; 38 Nick Kommer; 39 Heath Hocking (vc); 40 Ben Howlett; 41 Will Hams; 43 Kurt Aylett; 46 Orazio Fantasia	25 Ariel Steinberg; 29 Cory Dell'Olio; 44 Fraser Thurlow; 45 Johnny Rayner; 47 Patrick Ambrose	Head coach: Mark Thompson; Assistant coaches: Simon Goodwin (senior assistant); Neil Craig (head of coaching development and strategy); Matthew Egan (Defensive structure); James Byrne (development); Nathan Bassett (forward structure); Hayden Skipworth (VFL); Legend: (c) Captain(s); (vc) Vice-captain(s); Long-term injury list; Upgraded rookie(s); (vet) Veterans list; Updated: 28 November 2013; Source(s): Playing list, Coaching staff

=== Trades ===
In

Player	Traded From	Traded For
(New South Wales) Kurt Aylett (Northern Territory) Shaun Edwards	Greater Western Sydney	Draft Pick #48
(Victoria (state)) Paul Chapman	Geelong	Draft Pick #84

Out

Player	Traded To	Traded For
(Western Australia) Scott Gumbleton	Fremantle	Draft Pick #55
(Victoria (state)) Stewart Crameri	Western Bulldogs	Draft Pick #26

=== Drafts ===
National Draft

Round	Pick	Name	From	League
2	26	Zach Merrett	Sandringham Dragons	TAC Cup
3	55	Orazio Fantasia	Norwood	SANFL
4	66	Lauchlan Dalgleish	Rookie Promotion	

Pre-Season Draft

Round	Pick	Name	From	League
No Picks

Rookie Draft

Round	Pick	Name	From	League
1	9	Fraser Thurlow	Labrador	NEAFL
2	26	Patrick Ambrose	Old Xaverians	VAFA
3	41	Johnny Rayner	Alternative Talent Program	

=== Delisted ===
Seasons^{[s]}	Player
13	David Hille
6	Nathan Lovett-Murray
7	Alwyn Davey
3	Luke Davis
2	Hal Hunter

= Retired

== Results ==
=== Pre-season ===
==== Game 1 ====
	Game 1
Monday, 17 February 6:10 pm	Gold Coast 1.11.15 (90)	def.	Essendon 0.13.11 (89)	Metricon Stadium (crowd: 6,083)	Report

==== Game 2 ====
	Game 2
Tuesday, 25 February 7:10 pm	Essendon 0.9.11 (65)	def. by	Port Adelaide 1.11.15 (90)	Etihad Stadium (crowd: 8,022)	Report

==== Game 3 ====
	Game 3
Friday, 7 March 1:00 pm	Richmond 15.11 (101)	def.	Essendon 8.8 (56)	Punt Road (crowd: 2,100)	Report

=== Home and Away season ===
==== Round 1 ====
Round 1
Friday, 21 March 7:50 pm	North Melbourne	def. by	Essendon	Etihad Stadium (crowd: 42,332)	Report
3.0 (18); 5.3 (33); 8.5 (53); 9.6 (60)	Q1; Q2; Q3; Final	4.1 (25); 8.5 (53); 11.8 (74); 15.9 (99)	Umpires: Dalgleish, Mitchell, Mollison; Television broadcast: Channel 7
Thomas 4 Black, Dal Santo, Harvey, McKenzie, Wright 1	Goals	4 Chapman; 3 Goddard; 2 Hardingham, Daniher, Watson; 1 Howlett, Ryder
Thomas, Macmillan, Harvey, Cunnington, Mullett	Best	Watson, Chapman, Goddard, Heppell, Zaharakis, J.Merrett, Hooker
Goldstein (shoulder), Cunnington (concussion)	Injuries	Nil
Dustin Fletcher plays game 379 breaking Essendon's Most Games Played club record previously held by Simon Madden since 1992.

Brownlow Votes
3 TBA; 2 TBA; 1 TBA

Game Milestone
Debut Martin Gleeson; Debut Patrick Ambrose; Debut Zach Merrett; Club Debut Paul Chapman; 150 Games Ryder; 50 Games Jake Carlisle

==== Round 2 ====
Round 2
Friday, 28 March 7:50 pm	Essendon	def. by	Hawthorn	Etihad Stadium (crowd: 44,163)	Report
1.5 (11); 3.7 (25); 9.10 (64); 12.14 (86)	Q1; Q2; Q3; Final	4.1 (25); 9.3 (57); 9.7 (61); 13.12 (90)	Umpires: Chamberlain, Meredith, Ryan; Television broadcast: Channel 7
Ambrose 3 Hardingham, Carlisle 2 Zaharakis, Stanton, Hocking, Merrett, Chapman 1	Goals	2 Suckling, Breust, Rioli; 1 Roughead, Hill, Gunston, Hale, Lewis, Puopolo, Simpkin
Hibberd, Goddard, Watson, Heppell, Zaharakis, Ambrose	Best	Burgoyne, Gibson, Rioli, Suckling, Cheney
Ryder (left ankle)	Injuries	Hodge (groin)

==== Round 3 ====
Round 3
Sun, 6-Apr-2014 7:10 PM	Essendon	def.	Carlton	MCG (crowd: 62730)	Report
6.3 (39); 10.6 (66); 16.8 (104); 21.12 (138)	Q1; Q2; Q3; Final	0.3 (3); 3.4 (22); 6.8 (44); 8.9 (57)	Umpires: Fleer, Schmidt, Pannell; Television broadcast: Channel 7
Chapman, Winderlich 4 Hardingham, Stanton 3 Goddard 2 Heppell, Hocking, Melksham, Carlisle, Daniher 1	Goals	2 Ellard, Menzel; 1 Garlett, Henderson, Murphy, Tuohy
Hocking, Chapman, Winderlich, Carlisle, Goddard, Hibberd	Best	Walker, Simpson, Carrazzo, Gibbs
Ambrose (quad) replaced in selected side by Melksham	Injuries	Nil
Nil	Reports	Nil

== Ladder ==
2014 AFL ladder
Pos	Team	Pld	W	L	D	PF	PA	PP	Pts	
1	Sydney	22	17	5	0	2126	1488	142.9	68	Finals series
2	Hawthorn (P)	22	17	5	0	2458	1746	140.8	68	Finals series
3	Geelong	22	17	5	0	2033	1787	113.8	68	Finals series
4	Fremantle	22	16	6	0	2029	1556	130.4	64	Finals series
5	Port Adelaide	22	14	8	0	2180	1678	129.9	56	Finals series
6	North Melbourne	22	14	8	0	2026	1731	117.0	56	Finals series
7	Essendon	22	12	9	1	1828	1719	106.3	50	Finals series
8	Richmond	22	12	10	0	1887	1784	105.8	48	Finals series
9	West Coast	22	11	11	0	2045	1750	116.9	44	
10	Adelaide	22	11	11	0	2175	1907	114.1	44	
11	Collingwood	22	11	11	0	1766	1876	94.1	44	
12	Gold Coast	22	10	12	0	1917	2045	93.7	40	
13	Carlton	22	7	14	1	1891	2107	89.7	30	
14	Western Bulldogs	22	7	15	0	1784	2177	81.9	28	
15	Brisbane Lions	22	7	15	0	1532	2212	69.3	28	
16	Greater Western Sydney	22	6	16	0	1780	2320	76.7	24	
17	Melbourne	22	4	18	0	1336	1954	68.4	16	
18	St Kilda	22	4	18	0	1480	2436	60.8	16	

Source: AFL Tables
Rules for classification: 1) points; 2) percentage; 3) number of points for.
(P) Premiers

=== Ladder progress ===
Round	1	2	3	4	5	6	7	8	9	10	11	12	13	14	15	16	17	18	19	20	21	22	23
Ground	A	H	H	A	H	A	H	A	H	B	H	A	H	H	A	A	H	A	A	A	H	H	A
Result	W	L	W	L	L	L	W	W	L	B	W	W	L	W	L	W	W	W	L	L	W	W	D
Position	3	7	4	7	10	12	10	9	11	11	10	9	9	9	10	10	7	7	7	8	7	7	7

Source: Competitive Matches
A = Away; H = Home; B = Bye; W = Win; D = Draw; L = Lose

== Tribunal cases ==
Player	Round	Charge category (Level)	Verdict	Points^{[a]}	Result	Victim	Club	Ref(s)
None

== Season Statistics ==
=== Home attendance ===
Round	Opponent	Attendance
2	Hawthorn	44,163
3	Carlton	62,730
5	St Kilda	36,041
7	Western Bulldogs	33,289
9	Sydney	41,098
11	Richmond	74,664
13	Melbourne	44,626
14	Adelaide	30,948
17	Collingwood	58,996
21	West Coast	35,905
22	Gold Coast	33,281
Total Attendance		977,965
Average Attendance		44,453

== Notes ==
- ^{a} "Points" refers to carry-over points accrued following the sanction. For example, 154.69 points draw a one-match suspension, with 54.69 carry-over points (for every 100 points, a one-match suspension is given).
- ^{s} Denotes amount of seasons on the Essendon list only.
