= 2013 Essendon Football Club season =

Kunal lokre

Essendon Football Club
2013 season
- President: David Evans; Paul Little
- Coach: James Hird (3rd season)
- Captains: Jobe Watson (4th season)
- Home ground: Docklands Stadium
- AFL season: 9th
- Finals Series: Disqualified^{[b]}
- Best and Fairest: Brendon Goddard
- Leading goalkicker: Stewart Crameri (30)
- Highest home attendance: 93,373 vs. Collingwood (Round 5)
- Lowest home attendance: 30,143 vs. Greater Western Sydney (Round 6)
- Average home attendance: 46,412
- Club membership: 56,314 (▲8,606 / +6.54%)

The 2013 Essendon Football Club season was the club's 115th season in the Australian Football League (AFL).

This season also represented the first time since 2002 that the club independently competed with a reserves team in the Victorian Football League (VFL).

== Supplements controversy ==
On 5 February the Essendon Football Club asked Australian Sports Anti-Doping Authority (ASADA) to investigate the concerns over the clubs possible use of un-approved supplements during the 2012 season.
An Independent review conducted by Ziggy Switkowski regarding the Essendon Football Club governance processes was released to the public on 6 May.
CEO Ian Robson hands in his resignation on 23 May. He is replaced by former Tatts Group CEO and Essendon board member Ray Gunston as the interim CEO.
Chairman David Evans resigns citing health issues on 27 July. Former Toll Holdings Managing Director and Essendon board member Paul Little is elected to replace him as the new Essendon Chairman.
On 27 August, the AFL charged the Essendon Football Club with breaking "Rule 1.6 - engaging in conduct that is unbecoming or likely to prejudice the interests or reputation of the Australian Football League or to bring the game of football into disrepute". There have been no player sanctions from ASADA, whose investigation is still ongoing.

The following charges were handed down against club and personnel:

- $2,000,000 fine
- Club forfeits place in finals and deemed to have finished 9th
- Loss of First and Second Round draft selections in 2013 and 2014 draft
- Club receives end of First Round selection in 2014 draft
- James Hird, Head Coach - 12-month suspension (backdated to 25 August 2013)
- Danny Corcoran, Football Manager - 6-month suspension (two months of which is suspended for a period of two years)
- Mark Thompson, Senior Assistant - $30,000 fine
- Bruce Reid, Club Doctor - charges dropped

== Squad ==
Essendon Football Club
Senior list		Rookie List	Coaching staff
1 Michael Hibberd; 2 Tom Bellchambers; 3 Scott Gumbleton; 4 Jobe Watson (c); 5 Brent Stanton; 6 Joe Daniher; 7 Leroy Jetta; 8 Jason Winderlich; 9 Brendon Goddard; 10 Nick O'Brien; 11 David Zaharakis; 12 Stewart Crameri; 14 Jason Ashby; 15 Courtenay Dempsey; 16 Tayte Pears; 17 Jake Melksham; 18 Michael Hurley; 19 David Hille (vc) (vet); 20 Jackson Merrett; 21 Dyson Heppell	22 Jake Carlisle; 23 David Myers; 24 Alex Browne; 26 Cale Hooker; 27 Luke Davis; 28 Elliott Kavanagh; 29 Alwyn Davey; 30 Paddy Ryder; 31 Dustin Fletcher (vet); 32 Travis Colyer; 33 Dylan Van Unen; 34 Kyle Hardingham; 35 Martin Gleeson; 37 Sean Gregory; 38 Nick Kommer; 39 Heath Hocking (vc); 40 Ben Howlett; 41 Will Hams; 42 Nathan Lovett-Murray; 46 Mark Baguley	25 Ariel Steinberg; 36 Lauchlan Dalgleish; 45 Hal Hunter; 47 Cory Dell'Olio	Head coach: James Hird; Assistant coaches: Mark Thompson (senior assistant); Sean Wellman (defensive structure); Simon Goodwin (midfield structure); Matthew Egan (forward structure); James Byrne (development); Hayden Skipworth (Bendigo); Legend: (c) Captain(s); (vc) Vice-captain(s); Long-term injury list; Upgraded rookie(s); (vet) Veterans list; Updated: 31 October 2013; Source(s): Playing list, Coaching staff

=== Trades ===
In

Player	Traded From	Traded For
(Victoria (state)) Brendon Goddard^{[r]}	St Kilda	

= Free Agent

Out

Player	Traded To	Traded For
(South Australia) Angus Monfries	Port Adelaide	Draft Pick #48

=== Drafts ===
National Draft

Round	Pick	Name	From	League
1	10	(Victoria (state)) Joe Daniher^{[f]}	Calder Cannons	TAC Cup
2	34	(Victoria (state)) Jason Ashby	Oakleigh Chargers	TAC Cup
3	51	(Victoria (state)) Dylan Van Unen	Frankston Football Club	VFL
3	53	(Victoria (state)) Martin Gleeson	North Ballarat Rebels	TAC Cup
4	73	(Western Australia) Nicholas Kommer	East Perth Football Club	WAFL
5	88	(Victoria (state)) Sean Gregory	Calder Cannons	TAC Cup
6	101	Pass		
6	106	(Victoria (state)) Mark Baguley	Rookie promotion	

= Father–son selection

Rookie Draft

Round	Pick	Name	From	League
1	8	(Victoria (state)) Ariel Steinberg	Essendon	AFL

Pre-Season Draft

Round	Pick	Name	From	League
1	6	(Victoria (state)) Will Hams	Gippsland Power	TAC Cup

=== Delisted ===
Seasons^{[s]}	Player
14	Mark McVeigh
9	Ricky Dyson
8	Henry Slattery
7	Sam Lonergan
6	Kyle Reimers
4	Brent Prismall
2	Michael Ross
2	Anthony Long
2	Ariel Steinberg
1	Brendan Lee

= Retired

== Results ==
=== Pre-season (NAB Cup) ===
==== Round 1 ====
The three teams in each pool play each other in games of two 20 minute halves, with all three games being played over a three-hour period at the one venue.

	Round 1
Friday, 15 February 6:45 pm	Essendon 1.5.6 (45)	def.	Western Bulldogs 1.1.4 (19)	Etihad Stadium (crowd: 24,817)	Report
Friday, 15 February 8:55 pm	Collingwood 1.2.10 (31)	def.	Essendon 0.4.5 (29)	Etihad Stadium (crowd: 26,921)	Report

==== Round 2 ====
	Round 2
Saturday, 2 March 5:10 pm	Essendon 1.10.9 (78)	def. by	Richmond 2.8.20 (86)	Wangaratta Showgrounds (crowd: 11,000)	Report

==== Round 3 ====
	Round 3
Friday, 8 March 6:10 pm	Greater Western Sydney 0.4.4 (28)	def. by	Essendon 1.16.14 (119)	Manuka Oval (crowd: 8,044)	Report

=== Home and Away season ===
==== Round 1 ====
Round 1
Friday, 22 March 8:10 pm	Adelaide	def. by	Essendon	AAMI Stadium (crowd: 42,218)	Report
3.4 (22); 4.9 (33); 8.14 (62); 11.16 (82)	Q1; Q2; Q3; Final	1.3 (9); 7.5 (47); 13.7 (85); 18.9 (117)	Umpires: Rosebury, Meredith, Jeffery; Television broadcast: Channel 7
Walker 3 Douglas 2 Jenkins, Johncock, Mackay, Petrenko, Porplyzia, Van Berlo 1	Goals	4 Howlett; 3 Davey; 1 Bellchambers, Crameri, Dempsey, Goddard, Hibberd, Hocking, Kommer, Melksham, Myers, Stanton, Watson
Wright, Sloane, Douglas, Reilly, Vince	Best	Watson, Howlett, Heppell, Dempsey, Myers, Hibberd, Kommer, Merrett, Carlisle
Brown (Left Foot)	Injuries	Nil

Brownlow Votes
3 TBA; 2 TBA; 1 TBA

Game Milestone
Debut Nicholas Kommer

==== Round 2 ====
Round 2
Saturday, 6 April 7:40 pm	Essendon	def.	Melbourne	MCG (crowd: 51,153)	Report
6.2 (38); 13.6 (84); 21.11 (137); 28.16 (184)	Q1; Q2; Q3; Final	2.1 (13); 4.5 (29); 5.5 (35); 5.6 (36)	Umpires: Hosking, Kamolins, Wenn; Television broadcast: Channel 7
Crameri 6 Bellchambers 4 Watson 3 Davey, Heppell, Howlett, Merrett, Hurley, Stanton 2 Goddard, Ryder, Dempsey 1	Goals	2 Davey; 1 Grimes, Clark, Jones
Heppell, Watson, Bellchambers, Crameri, Goddard, Fletcher, Stanton, Howlett, Zaharakis	Best	Howe, Frawley, N Jones, Garland
Set Essendon's new largest winning margin against the Melbourne Football Club; Set Essendon's new largest winning margin at the MCG; Set Essendon's new largest winning margin in AFL era.

Brownlow Votes
3 TBA; 2 TBA; 1 TBA

==== Round 3 ====
Round 3
Friday, 12 April 6:40 pm	Fremantle	def. by	Essendon	Patersons Stadium (crowd: 35,963)	Report
5.3 (33); 7.5 (47); 7.7 (49); 9.14 (68)	Q1; Q2; Q3; Final	0.3 (3); 1.5 (11); 6.10 (46); 10.12 (72)	Umpires: Margetts, Farmer, Mollison; Television broadcast: Channel 7
Mayne 3 Fyfe, Walters 2 Ballantyne, Duffield 1	Goals	3 Crameri; 2 Hurley; 1 Kavanagh, Howlett, Kommer, Heppell, Ryder
Duffield, Fyfe, Mundy, Barlow, Ballantyne, Walters	Best	Hibberd, Carlisle, Hooker, Crameri, Ryder, Hurley
McPharlin (Concussed), Bradley (Cut Head)	Injuries	Hurley (Right Wrist)

Brownlow Votes
3 TBA; 2 TBA; 1 TBA

==== Round 4 ====
Round 4
Saturday, 20 April 4:40 pm	St Kilda	def. by	Essendon	Etihad Stadium (crowd: 46,965)	Report
3.2 (20); 5.6 (36); 9.9 (63); 13.13 (91)	Q1; Q2; Q3; Final	6.2 (38); 10.7 (67); 15.8 (98); 19.14 (128)	Umpires: Dalgleish, Chamberlain, Ryan; Television broadcast: Fox Sports
Riewoldt 3 Maister, Saad, Dennis-Lane 2 Gilbert, Milne, Armitage, Steven 1	Goals	4 Gumbleton, 3 Hurley, 2 Davey, Stanton, Watson, Bellchambers, 1 Dempsey, Goddard, Howlett, Merrett
Riewoldt, Armitage, Fisher, Roberton, Jones	Best	Watson, Heppell, Gumbleton, Hurley, Goddard, Hibberd, Stanton, Myers, Zaharakis
Injuries	Hurley (Ankle)

Brownlow Votes
3 TBA; 2 TBA; 1 TBA

==== Round 5 ====
Round 5
Thursday, 25 April 2:40 pm	Essendon	def.	Collingwood	MCG (crowd: 93,373)	Report
2.3 (15); 6.4 (40); 12.8 (80); 18.13 (121)	Q1; Q2; Q3; Final	1.5 (11); 4.12 (36); 7.14 (56); 10.15 (75)	Umpires: Rosebury, Meredith, Mollison; Television broadcast: Channel 7
Zaharakis 4 Winderlich 3 Gumbleton, Merrett, Watson, Davey, Bellchambers 2 Crameri 1	Goals	2 Blair, Pendlebury, Goldsack, Cloke; 1 Sidebottom, Elliott
Zaharakis, Watson, Winderlich, Stanton, Goddard, Carlisle, Hibberd	Best	Swan, Pendlebury, Reid, Sidebottom, Shaw
Carlisle (Foot)	Injuries	Toovey (Left Knee)
Third largest home and away crowd in VFL/AFL history

Brownlow Votes
3 TBA; 2 TBA; 1 TBA

Game Milestone
50 David Myers; 50 Kyle Hardingham

Anzac Medal
David Zaharakis

==== Round 6 ====
Round 6
Saturday, 4 May 1:45 pm	Essendon	def.	Greater Western Sydney	Etihad Stadium (crowd: 30,143)	Report
1.5 (11); 3.8 (26); 10.15 (75); 17.18 (120)	Q1; Q2; Q3; Final	5.2 (32); 7.5 (47); 8.9 (57); 12.19 (81)	Umpires: McBurney, Bannister, Burgess; Television broadcast: Channel 7
Crameri, Davey 4 Gumbleton 3 Hardingham, Goddard, Hocking, Bellchambers, Baguley, Hille 1	Goals	6 Cameron; 2 Scully, Adams; 1 Treloar, Bruce
Zaharakis, Hibberd, Goddard, Davey, Gumbleton, Dempsey, Crameri	Best	Cameron, Adams, Townsend, Mohr, Scully, Treloar
Stanton (Groin)	Injuries	Nil

Brownlow Votes
3 TBA; 2 TBA; 1 TBA

==== Round 7 ====
Round 7
Friday, 10 May 7:50 pm	Geelong	def.	Essendon	Etihad Stadium (crowd: 53,014)	Report
2.2 (14); 7.7 (49); 13.9 (87); 17.11 (113)	Q1; Q2; Q3; Final	2.5 (17); 6.9 (45); 7.18 (60); 11.19 (85)	Umpires: Rosebury, Stevic, Ryan; Television broadcast: Channel 7
Stokes 3 Blicavs, Hawkins, Lonergan, Smedts 2 Bartel, Christensen, Duncan, Motlop, Schroder, Selwood 1	Goals	2 Gumbleton, Myers, 1 Bellchambers, Crameri, Davey, Goddard, Hibberd, Hocking, Hurley
Johnson, Stokes, Motlop, Kelly, Enright, Blicavs, Smedts, Lonergan	Best	Hocking, Zaharakis, Goddard, Howlett, Heppell, Myers
Taylor Hunt (Right Shoulder)	Injuries	Alwyn Davey (Left Hamstring)
Was the 4th Highest attendance ever at Docklands Stadium

Brownlow Votes
3 TBA; 2 TBA; 1 TBA

==== Round 8 ====
Round 8
Saturday, 18 May 1:45 pm	Essendon	def. by	Brisbane Lions	Etihad Stadium (crowd: 33,915)	Report
3.1 (19); 7.6 (48); 10.9 (69); 12.14 (86)	Q1; Q2; Q3; Final	3.4 (22); 6.5 (41); 11.7 (73); 14.12 (96)	Umpires: Wenn, Pannell, Fisher; Television broadcast: Channel 7
Bellchambers, Heppell, Crameri 2 Watson, Myers, Kavanagh, Hocking, Ryder, Howlett 1	Goals	3 Zorko; 2 Brown; 1 Leuenberger, Redden, Black, Lisle, Hanley, Raines, Polkinghorne, Moloney, Staker
Heppell, Goddard, Carlisle, Watson, Hibberd, Zaharakis	Best	Zorko, Redden, Leuenberger, Polkinghorne, Raines, Lester, Bewick, Brown
Hurley (Concussion)	Injuries

Brownlow Votes
3 TBA; 2 TBA; 1 TBA

==== Round 9 ====
Round 9
Saturday, 25 May 7:45 pm	Richmond	def. by	Essendon	MCG (crowd: 84, 234)	Report
2.2 (14); 4.5 (29); 6.5 (41); 9.8 (62)	Q1; Q2; Q3; Final	2.3 (15); 7.7 (49); 11.9 (75); 13.13 (91)	Umpires: Donlon, Rosebury, Findlay; Television broadcast: Channel 7
Riewoldt 2 Cotchin, Edwards, King, Martin, McGuane, Nahas, Vlastuin 1	Goals	3 Crameri, Watson; 2 Zaharakis; 1 Hibberd, Howlett, Melksham, Stanton, Winderlich
Rance, Grigg, Chaplin, Vlastuin, Newman, Jackson	Best	Watson, Zaharakis, Stanton, Goddard, Hibberd, Hocking, Dempsey
Injuries	Hurley (Ankle)

Brownlow Votes
3 TBA; 2 TBA; 1 TBA

==== Round 10 ====
Round 10
Saturday, 1 June 4:40 pm	Sydney	v	Essendon	SCG (crowd: 29,792)
3.4.22; 6.7.43; 11.10.76; 17.13.115	Q1; Q2; Q3; Final	1.4.10; 3.7.25; 7.9.51; 10.11.71	Umpires: Donlon, Dalgleish, Rosebury; Television broadcast: Fox Sports
Goodes 4, Malceski 2, Parker, O’Keefe, Mumford, Mitchell, McGlynn, Kennedy, Jetta, Jack Everett, Bird, Pyke	Goals	Goddard 2, Crameri 2, Carlisle 2, Winderlich, Melksham, Hibberd, Bellchambers
Kennedy, Grundy, Goodes, Bird, McVeigh, Jack	Best	Stanton, Goddard, Heppell, Zaharakis, Watson, Windsrlich
Walsh (hamatring)	Injuries	Dempsey (chest, lungs), Gumbleton (ankle), Howlett (shoulder)
nil	Reports	nil

Brownlow Votes
3 TBA; 2 TBA; 1 TBA

==== Round 11 ====
Round 11
Friday, 7 June 7:50 pm	Essendon	v	Carlton	MCG
Q1; Q2; Q3; Final	Television broadcast: Channel 7
This game celebrates the 140th anniversary of the Essendon Football Club's first ever match, played against Carlton on 7 June 1873.

Brownlow Votes
3 TBA; 2 TBA; 1 TBA

==== Round 12 ====
Round 12
Saturday, 15 June 7:40 pm	Essendon	v	Gold Coast	Etihad Stadium
Q1; Q2; Q3; Final	Television broadcast: Channel 7

Brownlow Votes
3 TBA; 2 TBA; 1 TBA

==== Round 13 ====
Bye

==== Round 14 ====
Round 14
Thursday, 27 June 6:10 pm	West Coast	v	Essendon	Patersons Stadium
Q1; Q2; Q3; Final	Television broadcast: Channel 7

Brownlow Votes
3 TBA; 2 TBA; 1 TBA

==== Round 15 ====
Round 15
Sunday, 7 July 4:40 pm	Essendon	v	Port Adelaide	Etihad Stadium
Q1; Q2; Q3; Final	Television broadcast: Fox Sports

Brownlow Votes
3 TBA; 2 TBA; 1 TBA

==== Round 16 ====
Round 16
Sunday, 14 July 3:15 pm	Western Bulldogs	v	Essendon	Etihad Stadium
Q1; Q2; Q3; Final	Television broadcast: Channel 7

Brownlow Votes
3 TBA; 2 TBA; 1 TBA

==== Round 17 ====
Round 17
Saturday, 20 July 2.10 pm	Greater Western Sydney	v	Essendon	Skoda Stadium
Q1; Q2; Q3; Final	Television broadcast: Fox Sports

Brownlow Votes
3 TBA; 2 TBA; 1 TBA

==== Round 18 ====
Round 18
Friday, 26 July 7:50 pm	Essendon	v	Hawthorn	Etihad Stadium
Q1; Q2; Q3; Final	Television broadcast: Channel 7

Brownlow Votes
3 TBA; 2 TBA; 1 TBA

==== Round 19 ====
Round 19
Sunday, 4 August 4:40 pm	Collingwood	v	Essendon	MCG
Q1; Q2; Q3; Final	Television broadcast: Fox Sports

Brownlow Votes
3 TBA; 2 TBA; 1 TBA

==== Round 20 ====
Round 20
Sunday, 11 August 1:10 pm	Essendon	v	West Coast	Etihad Stadium
Q1; Q2; Q3; Final	Television broadcast: Fox Sports

Brownlow Votes
3 TBA; 2 TBA; 1 TBA

==== Round 21 ====
Round 21
Saturday, 17 August 4:40 pm	Essendon	v	North Melbourne	Etihad Stadium
Q1; Q2; Q3; Final	Television broadcast: Fox Sports

Brownlow Votes
3 TBA; 2 TBA; 1 TBA

==== Round 22 ====
Round 22
Saturday, 24 August 7:40 pm	Carlton	v	Essendon	MCG
Q1; Q2; Q3; Final	Television broadcast: Channel 7

Brownlow Votes
3 TBA; 2 TBA; 1 TBA

==== Round 23 ====
Round 23
TBC	Essendon	v	Richmond	MCG
Q1; Q2; Q3; Final	Television broadcast: TBC

Brownlow Votes
3 TBA; 2 TBA; 1 TBA

== Ladder ==
2013 AFL ladder
Pos	Team	Pld	W	L	D	PF	PA	PP	Pts	
1	Hawthorn (P)	22	19	3	0	2523	1859	135.7	76	Finals series
2	Geelong	22	18	4	0	2409	1776	135.6	72	Finals series
3	Fremantle	22	16	5	1	2035	1518	134.1	66	Finals series
4	Sydney	22	15	6	1	2244	1694	132.5	62	Finals series
5	Richmond	22	15	7	0	2154	1754	122.8	60	Finals series
6	Collingwood	22	14	8	0	2148	1868	115.0	56	Finals series
7	Port Adelaide	22	12	10	0	2051	2002	102.4	48	Finals series
8	Carlton	22	11	11	0	2125	1992	106.7	44	Finals series
9	Essendon	22	14	8	0	2145	2000	107.3	56 (Note: Essendon was relegated to ninth due to irregularities in its supplements program during the 2012 season.)	
10	North Melbourne	22	10	12	0	2307	1930	119.5	40	
11	Adelaide	22	10	12	0	2064	1909	108.1	40	
12	Brisbane Lions	22	10	12	0	1922	2144	89.6	40	
13	West Coast	22	9	13	0	2038	2139	95.3	36	
14	Gold Coast	22	8	14	0	1918	2091	91.7	32	
15	Western Bulldogs	22	8	14	0	1926	2262	85.1	32	
16	St Kilda	22	5	17	0	1751	2120	82.6	20	
17	Melbourne	22	2	20	0	1455	2691	54.1	8	
18	Greater Western Sydney	22	1	21	0	1524	2990	51.0	4	

Source: AFL Tables
Rules for classification: 1) points; 2) percentage; 3) number of points for.
(P) Premiers

=== Ladder progress ===
Round	1	2	3	4	5	6	7	8	9	10	11	12	13	14	15	16	17	18	19	20	21	22	23
Ground	A	H	A	A	H	H	A	H	A	A	H	H	B	A	H	A	A	H	A	H	H	A	H
Result	W	W	W	W	W	W	L	L	W	L	W	W		W	W	W	W	L	L	L	L	W	L
Position	3	1	1	1	1	1	2	3	3	5	4	3	4	3	3	3	2	4	5	7	7	9^{[b]}	9^{[b]}

Source: Competitive Matches
A = Away; H = Home; B = Bye; W = Win; D = Draw; L = Lose

== Tribunal cases ==
Player	Round	Charge category (Level)	Verdict	Points^{[a]}	Result	Victim	Club	Ref(s)
Paddy Ryder	3	Rough Conduct (4)	Guilty (Early Plea)	368.25	3 Weeks	Luke McPharlin	Fremantle	
Nick Kommer	3	Rough Conduct (3)	Guilty (Early Plea)	243.75	2 Weeks	Kepler Bradley	Fremantle	
Tom Bellchambers	4	Engaging in a Melee	Guilty (Early Plea)	0	$2100		St Kilda	
Michael Hibberd	4	Engaging in a Melee	Guilty (Early Plea)	0	$2100		St Kilda	
Jake Carlisle	4	Engaging in a Melee	Guilty (Early Plea)	0	$2100		St Kilda	
Leroy Jetta	10	Rough Conduct (1)	Guilty (Early Plea)	93.75	Reprimand	Ben McGlynn	Sydney	
Jake Carlisle	18	Striking (2)	Guilty (Early Plea)	93.75	Reprimand	Lance Franklin	Hawthorn	
Jake Melksham	18	Rough Conduct (1)	Guilty (Early Plea)	93.75	Reprimand	Jarryd Roughead	Hawthorn	
Nick Kommer	18	Abusive Language	Guilty (Early Plea)	0	$1950	Michael Palm	Umpire	

== Season Statistics ==
=== Home attendance ===
Round	Opponent	Attendance
2	Melbourne	51,153
5	Collingwood	93,373
6	Greater Western Sydney	30,143
8	Brisbane Lions	33,915
11	Carlton	82,639
12	Gold Coast	31,452
15	Port Adelaide	40,817
18	Hawthorn	49,505
20	West Coast	32,595
21	North Melbourne	34,102
23	Richmond	60,979
Total Attendance		510,530
Average Attendance		46,412

=== Awards ===
==== Brownlow Medal ====
Votes	Player
17	Jobe Watson
10	Dyson Heppell
9	Brendon Goddard
8	Michael Hibberd
6	Jake Carlisle
5	Tom Bellchambers
4	David Zaharakis
3	Ben Howlett
2	Cale Hooker
2	Brent Stanton
2	Jason Winderlich
1	Stewart Crameri
1	Michael Hurley
1	Heath Hocking
1	Paddy Ryder

= Ineligible due to suspension

==== Crichton Medal ====
Votes	Player
431	Brendon Goddard
382	Jobe Watson
336	Dyson Heppell
321	Michael Hibberd
294	Jake Melksham
241	Jake Carlisle
229	Brent Stanton
211	Heath Hocking
207	Cale Hooker
191	David Zaharakis

==== Other Awards ====
Award Name	Player
Bruce Heymanson Best Clubman	Dyson Heppell
Matthew Lloyd Senior Leading Goal Kicking	Stewart Crameri
Lindsay Griffiths Rising Star	Jackson Merrett
Most Improved Player	Mark Baguley
Adam Ramanauskas Most Courageous Player	Michael Hibberd
Best Team Player	Kyle Hardingham
Essendon Goal of the Year	TBA
Essendon Mark of the Year	TBA

== Season Financials ==
EFC Annual Report 2013

Item	$2013	$2012	Change
Revenue	$63,690,189	$65,012,247	$1,322,058
Membership & Reserved Seating	$10,347,024	$9,367,066	$979,958
Gate Receipts	$637,773	$726,504	$88,731
Marketing Revenue	$16,837,899	$15,902,153	$935,746
Merchandise Revenue	$3,249,850	$3,226,302	$23,548
Football Department Spend	$20,824,236	$19,200,704	$1,623,532
Operating Profit/Loss	-$3,194,755	$401,429	$2,793,326
Total Profit/Loss	$2,148,492	$12,345,536	$10,197,044

== Notes ==
- ^{a} "Points" refers to carry-over points accrued following the sanction. For example, 154.69 points draw a one-match suspension, with 54.69 carry-over points (for every 100 points, a one-match suspension is given).
- ^{f} Son of Anthony Daniher (118 Games).
- ^{r} Restricted Free agent
- ^{s} Denotes amount of seasons on the Essendon list only.
- ^{H} Home game.
- ^{A} Away game.
- ^{b} Relegated to 9th place due to AFL Sanctions
