= 2018 Essendon Football Club season =

The 2018 Essendon Football Club season was the Essendon Football Club's 120th season in the Australian Football League. They also fielded a reserves team in the Victorian Football League.

== AFL ==
Essendon Football Club
2018 season
- President: Lindsay Tanner
- Coach: John Worsfold
- Captain: Dyson Heppell
- Home grounds: Etihad Stadium (Capacity: 56,347)

=== List changes ===
Three veteran Essendon players decided to retire at the end of the 2017 season: two-time All-Australian Jobe Watson, former Geelong three-time premiership player James Kelly and 255-game player Brent Stanton. After the season Essendon also announced that they had delisted Heath Hocking.

During trade period three different players requested trades to Essendon. The first trade to be completed was that of Greater Western Sydney player Devon Smith, who Essendon acquired with their first round pick for the 2017 draft. Later they also secured Adam Saad from Gold Coast with their 2018 second round pick, before getting forward Jake Stringer from the Western Bulldogs in exchange for two second-round draft picks on the last day of the trade period.

==== Retirements and delistings ====
| Player | Date | Reason | Games | Goals | Ref. |
|---|---|---|---|---|---|
| Yestin Eades | 15 February 2017 | Delisted | 0 | 0 | |
| Jobe Watson | 9 August 2017 | Retired, effective at end of season | 220 | 113 | |
| James Kelly | 16 August 2017 | Retired, effective at end of season | 313 | 90 | |
| Brent Stanton | 24 August 2017 | Retired, effective at end of season | 255 | 158 | |
| Heath Hocking | 15 September 2017 | Delisted | 126 | 45 | |

==== Trades ====
| Date | Gained | From | Lost | Ref. |
|---|---|---|---|---|
| 12 October 2017 | Devon Smith; Pick 24; 2018 second round pick (Greater Western Sydney) | Greater Western Sydney | Pick 11; 2018 third round pick (Essendon) | |
| 16 October 2017 | Adam Saad | Gold Coast | 2018 second round pick (Essendon) | |
| 19 October 2017 | Jake Stringer | Western Bulldogs | Pick 25; Pick 30 | |

=== Squad ===
Essendon Football Club
| Senior list | | Rookie list | Coaching staff |
|---|---|---|---|
| 1 Andrew McGrath; 2 Tom Bellchambers; 3 Darcy Parish; 4 Kyle Langford; 5 Devon Smith; 6 Joe Daniher; 7 Zach Merrett (vc); 8 Martin Gleeson; 9 Brendon Goddard; 10 Aaron Francis; 11 David Zaharakis; 12 Mark Baguley; 13 Orazio Fantasia; 14 Jordan Ridley; 15 Josh Green; 16 Josh Begley; 17 James Stewart; 18 Michael Hurley; 19 Kobe Mutch; 20 Jackson Merrett | 21 Dyson Heppell (c); 22 Matthew Leuenberger; 23 David Myers; 24 Jordan Houlahan; 25 Jake Stringer; 26 Cale Hooker (vc); 27 Mason Redman; 28 Mitch Brown; 29 Patrick Ambrose; 30 Brandon Zerk-Thatcher; 32 Travis Colyer; 33 Jayden Laverde; 34 Jake Long; 35 Matt Guelfi; 36 Michael Hartley; 37 Dylan Clarke; 42 Adam Saad; 43 Anthony McDonald-Tipungwuti; 45 Conor McKenna; 49 Matt Dea | 38 Sam Draper; 39 Trent Mynott; 40 Luke Lavender (B); 41 Ben McNiece (B); 44 Shaun McKernan | Head coach: John Worsfold; Assistant coaches: Mark Neeld (general performance manager); Hayden Skipworth (midfield); Mark Harvey (defence); James Kelly (development coach); Mark Corrigan (performance coach); Dan Jordan (VFL coach); Paul Corrigan (forwards); Rob Harding (opposition strategy and game intelligence); Legend: (c) Captain(s); (vc) Vice-captain(s); (B) Category B rookie; Updated: 28 November 2017; Source(s): Playing list, Coaching staff |

=== Ladder ===
| Pos | Team | Pld | W | L | D | PF | PA | PP | Pts | Qualification |
|---|---|---|---|---|---|---|---|---|---|---|
| 1 | Richmond | 22 | 18 | 4 | 0 | 2143 | 1574 | 136.1 | 72 | 2018 finals |
| 2 | West Coast (P) | 22 | 16 | 6 | 0 | 2012 | 1657 | 121.4 | 64 | 2018 finals |
| 3 | Collingwood | 22 | 15 | 7 | 0 | 2046 | 1699 | 120.4 | 60 | 2018 finals |
| 4 | Hawthorn | 22 | 15 | 7 | 0 | 1972 | 1642 | 120.1 | 60 | 2018 finals |
| 5 | Melbourne | 22 | 14 | 8 | 0 | 2299 | 1749 | 131.4 | 56 | 2018 finals |
| 6 | Sydney | 22 | 14 | 8 | 0 | 1822 | 1664 | 109.5 | 56 | 2018 finals |
| 7 | Greater Western Sydney | 22 | 13 | 8 | 1 | 1898 | 1661 | 114.3 | 54 | 2018 finals |
| 8 | Geelong | 22 | 13 | 9 | 0 | 2045 | 1554 | 131.6 | 52 | 2018 finals |
| 9 | North Melbourne | 22 | 12 | 10 | 0 | 1950 | 1790 | 108.9 | 48 | |
| 10 | Port Adelaide | 22 | 12 | 10 | 0 | 1780 | 1654 | 107.6 | 48 | |
| 11 | Essendon | 22 | 12 | 10 | 0 | 1932 | 1838 | 105.1 | 48 | |
| 12 | Adelaide | 22 | 12 | 10 | 0 | 1941 | 1865 | 104.1 | 48 | |
| 13 | Western Bulldogs | 22 | 8 | 14 | 0 | 1575 | 2037 | 77.3 | 32 | |
| 14 | Fremantle | 22 | 8 | 14 | 0 | 1556 | 2041 | 76.2 | 32 | |
| 15 | Brisbane Lions | 22 | 5 | 17 | 0 | 1825 | 2049 | 89.1 | 20 | |
| 16 | St Kilda | 22 | 4 | 17 | 1 | 1606 | 2125 | 75.6 | 18 | |
| 17 | Gold Coast | 22 | 4 | 18 | 0 | 1308 | 2182 | 59.9 | 16 | |
| 18 | Carlton | 22 | 2 | 20 | 0 | 1353 | 2282 | 59.3 | 8 | |

Source: AFL
Rules for classification: 1) points; 2) percentage; 3) number of points for.
(P) Premiers
