= 2017 Essendon Football Club season =

Essendon Football Club
2017 season
- President: Lindsay Tanner
- Coach: John Worsfold
- Captain: Dyson Heppell
- Home ground: Etihad Stadium
- AFL season: 7th
- Finals series: 8th
- W. S. Crichton Medal: Joe Daniher
- Leading goalkicker: Joe Daniher (65)

The 2017 Essendon Football Club season was Essendon's 119th season in the Australian Football League.

== Squad ==
Essendon Football Club
Senior list		Rookie list	Coaching staff
1 Andrew McGrath; 2 Tom Bellchambers; 3 Darcy Parish; 4 Jobe Watson; 5 Brent Stanton; 6 Joe Daniher; 7 Zach Merrett (vc); 8 Martin Gleeson; 9 Brendon Goddard; 10 Aaron Francis; 11 David Zaharakis; 12 Mark Baguley; 13 Orazio Fantasia; 14 Jordan Ridley; 15 Josh Green; 16 Josh Begley; 17 James Stewart; 18 Michael Hurley; 19 Kobe Mutch; 20 Jackson Merrett	21 Dyson Heppell (c); 22 Matthew Leuenberger; 23 David Myers; 24 Craig Bird; 25 Alex Morgan; 26 Cale Hooker (vc); 27 Mason Redman; 28 Mitch Brown; 29 Patrick Ambrose; 30 Kyle Langford; 32 Travis Colyer; 33 Jayden Laverde; 36 Michael Hartley; 37 Dylan Clarke; 39 Heath Hocking; 40 Ben Howlett; 43 Anthony McDonald-Tipungwuti; 45 Conor McKenna; 47 James Kelly; 49 Matt Dea	34 Jake Long; 38 Sam Draper; 41 Ben McNiece (B); 44 Shaun McKernan	Head coach: John Worsfold; Assistant coaches: Mark Neeld (general performance manager); Hayden Skipworth (forwards); Mark Harvey (defence); Guy McKenna (midfield); Mark Corrigan (development coach); Dan Jordan (development coach); Paul Corrigan (VFL coach); Rob Harding (opposition strategy and game intelligence); Legend: (c) Captain(s); (vc) Vice-captain(s); Long-term injury list; Upgraded rookie(s); (B) Category B rookie; Updated: 22 June 2017; Source(s): Playing list, Coaching staff

== Season summary ==
=== Pre-season ===
**Week**	**Date and local time**	**Opponent**	**Scores** (Essendon's scores indicated in **bold**)			**Venue**	**Attendance**	**Ref.**
**Week**	**Date and local time**	**Opponent**	Home	Away	Margin	**Venue**	**Attendance**	**Ref.**
1	Thursday, 16 February (7:40 pm)	Collingwood	2.13.9 (105)	**0.14.10 (94)**	Lost by 11 points	Etihad Stadium (A)	16,521	
2	Sunday, 26 February (3:40 pm)	Gold Coast	0.12.7 (79)	**0.12.4 (76)**	Lost by 3 points	Harrup Park Country Club (A)	3,893	
3	Sunday, 12 March (4:10 pm)	Geelong	1.17.11 (122)	**2.12.10 (100)**	Lost by 22 points	Queen Elizabeth Oval (A)	8,391	

=== Home and Away season ===
**Round**	**Date and local time**	**Opponent**	**Scores** (Essendon's scores indicated in **bold**)			**Venue**	**Attendance**	**Ref.**
**Round**	**Date and local time**	**Opponent**	Home	Away	Margin	**Venue**	**Attendance**	**Ref.**
1	Saturday, 25 March (7:25 pm)	Hawthorn	**17.14 (116)**	12.19 (91)	Won by 25 points	MCG (H)	78,294	
2	Saturday, 1 April (6:25 pm)	Brisbane Lions	12.12 (84)	**17.9 (111)**	Won by 27 points	Gabba (A)	21,749	
3	Sunday, 9 April (3:20 pm)	Carlton	7.15 (57)	**6.6 (42)**	Lost by 15 points	MCG (A)	48,022	
4	Saturday, 15 April (7:10 pm)	Adelaide	24.9 (153)	**13.10 (88)**	Lost by 65 points	Adelaide Oval (A)	47,492	
5	Tuesday, 25 April (3:20 pm)	Collingwood	**15.10 (100)**	11.16 (82)	Won by 18 points	MCG (H)	87,685	
6	Sunday, 30 April (1:10 pm)	Melbourne	**10.14 (74)**	17.10 (112)	Lost by 38 points	Etihad Stadium (H)	44,040	
7	Sunday, 7 May (2:40 pm)	Fremantle	17.14 (116)	**11.13 (79)**	Lost by 37 points	Domain Stadium (A)	33,393	
8	Saturday, 13 May (7:25 pm)	Geelong	**17.8 (110)**	13.15 (93)	Won by 17 points	MCG (H)	57,172	
9	Sunday, 21 May (1:10 pm)	West Coast	**19.11 (125)**	8.16 (64)	Won by 61 points	Etihad Stadium (H)	36,403	
10	Saturday, 27 May (7:25 pm)	Richmond	11.15 (81)	**10.6 (66)**	Lost by 15 points	MCG (A)	85,656	
11	Saturday, 3 June (4:35 pm)	Greater Western Sydney	18.9 (117)	**15.11 (101)**	Lost by 16 points	Spotless Stadium (A)	13,671	
12	Saturday, 10 June (7:25 pm)	Port Adelaide	**19.17 (131)**	8.13 (61)	Won by 70 points	Etihad Stadium (H)	34,022	
13	Bye							
14	Friday, 23 June (7:50 pm)	Sydney	11.20 (86)	**12.13 (85)**	Lost by 1 point	SCG (A)	34,575	
15	Sunday, 2 July (1:10 pm)	Brisbane Lions	**11.16 (82)**	13.12 (90)	Lost by 8 points	Etihad Stadium (H)	41,246	
16	Saturday, 8 July (2:10 pm)	Collingwood	12.8 (80)	**18.9 (117)**	Won by 37 points	MCG (A)	63,537	
17	Friday, 14 July (7:50 pm)	St Kilda	7.15 (57)	**17.16 (118)**	Won by 61 points	Etihad Stadium (A)	47,156	
18	Saturday, 22 July (1:45 pm)	North Melbourne	**20.12 (132)**	16.9 (105)	Won by 27 points	Etihad Stadium (H)	40,359	
19	Sunday, 30 July (1:10 pm)	Western Bulldogs	19.13 (127)	**13.19 (97)**	Lost by 30 points	Etihad Stadium (A)	48,754	
20	Saturday, 5 August (2:10 pm)	Carlton	**11.18 (84)**	11.10 (76)	Won by 8 points	MCG (H)	58,562	
21	Saturday, 12 August (7:25 pm)	Adelaide	**12.8 (80)**	18.15 (123)	Lost by 43 points	Etihad Stadium (H)	38,487	
22	Saturday, 19 August (7:25 pm)	Gold Coast	9.3 (57)	**12.18 (90)**	Won by 33 points	Metricon Stadium (A)	16,817	
23	Sunday, 27 August (1:10 pm)	Fremantle	**16.11 (107)**	14.8 (92)	Won by 15 points	Etihad Stadium (H)	42,665	

=== Finals ===
**Round**	**Date and local time**	**Opponent**	**Scores** (Essendon's scores indicated in **bold**)			**Venue**	**Attendance**	**Ref.**
**Round**	**Date and local time**	**Opponent**	Home	Away	Margin	**Venue**	**Attendance**	**Ref.**
EF2	Saturday, 9 September (4:20 pm)	Sydney	19.7 (121)	**8.8 (56)**	Lost by 65 points	SCG	46,323	

=== Ladder ===
Pos	Team	Pld	W	L	D	PF	PA	PP	Pts	Qualification
1	Adelaide	22	15	6	1	2415	1776	136.0	62	2017 finals
2	Geelong	22	15	6	1	2134	1818	117.4	62	2017 finals
3	Richmond (P)	22	15	7	0	1992	1684	118.3	60	2017 finals
4	Greater Western Sydney	22	14	6	2	2081	1812	114.8	60	2017 finals
5	Port Adelaide	22	14	8	0	2168	1671	129.7	56	2017 finals
6	Sydney	22	14	8	0	2093	1651	126.8	56	2017 finals
**7**	Essendon	**22**	**12**	**10**	**0**	**2135**	**2004**	**106.5**	48	2017 finals
8	West Coast	22	12	10	0	1964	1858	105.7	48	2017 finals
9	Melbourne	22	12	10	0	2035	1934	105.2	48	
10	Western Bulldogs	22	11	11	0	1857	1913	97.1	44	
11	St Kilda	22	11	11	0	1925	1986	96.9	44	
12	Hawthorn	22	10	11	1	1864	2055	90.7	42	
13	Collingwood	22	9	12	1	1944	1963	99.0	38	
14	Fremantle	22	8	14	0	1607	2160	74.4	32	
15	North Melbourne	22	6	16	0	1983	2264	87.6	24	
16	Carlton	22	6	16	0	1594	2038	78.2	24	
17	Gold Coast	22	6	16	0	1756	2311	76.0	24	
18	Brisbane Lions	22	5	17	0	1877	2526	74.3	20	

Source: AFL
Rules for classification: 1) points; 2) percentage; 3) number of points for.
(P) Premiers
