= Zach Merrett =

Australian rules footballer (born 1995)

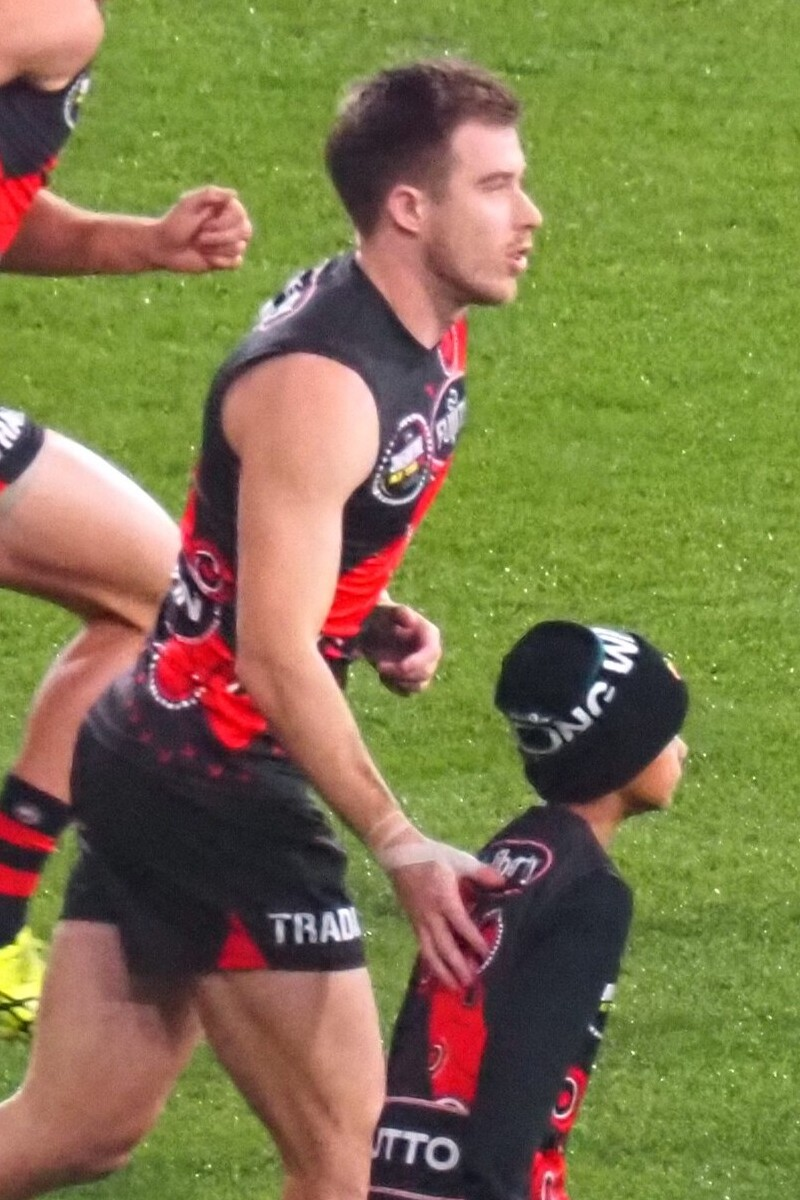
- Merrett pre-match with Essendon in 2025

Personal information
- Full name: Zachary Merrett
- Born: 3 October 1995 (age 31); Cobden, Victoria
- Original team: Sandringham Dragons (TAC Cup)
- Draft: No. 26, 2013 national draft
- Debut: Round 1, 2014, Essendon vs. North Melbourne, at Etihad Stadium
- Height: 180 cm (5 ft 11 in)
- Weight: 83 kg (183 lb)
- Position: Midfielder

Club information
- Current club: Hawthorn

Playing career^{1}
| Years | Club | Games (Goals) |
| 2014–2026 | Essendon | 274 (97) |
| 2027– | Hawthorn | 0 (0) |
| Total | | 274 (97) |

Representative team honours^{2}
| Years | Team | Games (Goals) |
| 2026 | Victoria | 1 (2) |
- ^{1} Playing statistics correct to the end of the 2026 season.^{2} Representative statistics correct as of 2026.

Career highlights
- Essendon captain: 2023–2025; 3× All-Australian team: 2017, 2021, 2023; 7× Crichton Medal: 2016, 2019, 2021, 2023, 2024, 2025, 2026; Anzac Medal: 2024; Yiooken Award: 2023; AFL Rising Star nominee: 2014

Zachary Merrett (born 3 October 1995) is a professional Australian rules footballer playing for the Hawthorn Football Club in the Australian Football League (AFL). Inititally drafted to Essendon, Merrett is a three-time All-Australian and seven-time Crichton Medallist; he also won the Yiooken Award in 2023 and the Anzac Medal in 2024. Merrett served as Essendon captain from 2023 to 2025.

== Early life and junior football ==
Merrett grew up in Cobden, Victoria, before boarding at Melbourne Grammar School on a cricket scholarship. Merrett participated in the Auskick program at Cobden. As a junior, Merrett played for Cobden Football Club and as a kid supported the Western Bulldogs. After a promising junior cricket career, Merrett focused on his football and had a breakout year. He played every game for Vic Country and impressed in many; he took that form into the end of the TAC Cup season, where he was a consistent contributor for the Sandringham Dragons. Known as a ball-winner in the TAC cup, he averaged 25.7 disposals a game during the tournament. He is the younger brother and former teammate of Jackson Merrett.

Zach's father, Greg, is a second cousin to the former Essendon and Brisbane Bears dual-premiership player Roger Merrett. This makes Zach (along with his brother Jackson) second cousins, once removed, to Roger.

The family tree actually has quite a deep VFL/AFL pedigree. Beyond Roger, Zach is also related to Collingwood dual-premiership player Thorold Merrett. On top of that, his grandmother is cousins with the 1960s Geelong premiership twins Alistair and Stewart Lord.

== AFL career ==
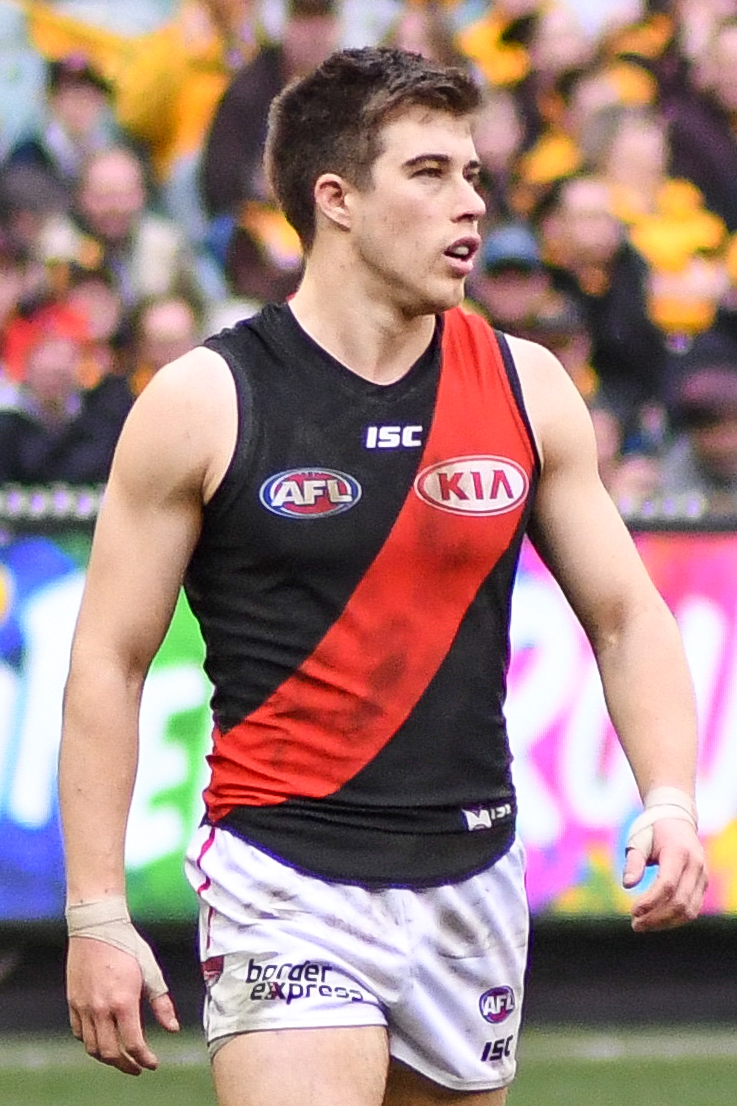
Merrett playing for Essendon in 2018

After predictions Merrett would be drafted inside the top thirty in the 2013 national draft, he was recruited by the Essendon Football Club with their second selection and twenty-sixth overall. Merrett made his debut in the opening round of the 2014 AFL season against North Melbourne. He was named as the substitute and came on late in the game, replacing Martin Gleeson. He was rewarded with a nomination for the 2014 AFL Rising Star after he collected 22 disposals, three tackles, and two goals in the round 11 win against Richmond.

The 2015 AFL season saw Merrett spend more time in the midfield. In August, following Essendon's 87-point loss to the Western Bulldogs in round 18, it was announced that he would miss the remainder of the season with a major stress fracture in his foot.

In round 21, 2016, he became the third-youngest match-day captain in Essendon history when he led the side against Gold Coast at Etihad Stadium. Under his leadership, they won just their second match for the season, defeating the Suns by six points. He won the W.S. Crichton Medal as the club's best and fairest player for 2016, becoming the youngest player in 35 years to win the award. His magnificent season was capped off by polling 19 votes in the 2016 Brownlow Medal. This was the third-most votes for a player whose team won three or fewer games, and the most for a Bombers player since Jobe Watson polled 30 votes (although Watson's award was later rescinded due to the Essendon Football Club supplements saga).

Merrett was named vice-captain for the 2017 AFL season. He had another fantastic season, collecting 659 disposals, receiving his first selection in the All-Australian team, and being named vice-captain in the 22under22 team for the second year in a row.

His 2018 season failed to reach the heights of his previous, after being concussed in the opening round against the Adelaide Crows. He was continuously tagged throughout the year, but he showed signs of improvement as Essendon worked towards a resurgence.

In January of the 2019 pre-season, Merrett injured his ankle, resulting in the use of a moon boot for 2 weeks; however, he was available for selection in round 1. Merrett went on to return to near his best football during the 2019 season, which was capped off with a second club best and fairest award, comfortably surpassing new Essendon recruit Dylan Shiel.

The Essendon midfielder in 2020 averaged 26.3 disposals and 4.3 marks, a statistic ranked elite by Champion Data, in shortened quarters to finish second in the Crichton Medal. His 13 Brownlow Medal votes from 16 games, equal 11th overall, saw him rise to 12th position on the club's all-time votes leaderboard.

Before the start of the 2021 AFL season, Merrett was re-added to the club’s leadership group with fellow Bombers Michael Hurley, Andrew McGrath and club captain Dyson Heppell. This was after being removed from the club leadership in the 2020 season, which was seen by some as a surprising move. Merrett started the 2021 season in great form with 31 disposals and a goal in Essendon's round 1 loss to Hawthorn. With injuries to key midfielders Jye Caldwell and Dylan Shiel in Essendon's Round 2 loss to Port Adelaide, much of the midfield load was placed upon Merrett. Merrett would share most of the midfield responsibilities with fellow emerging talent Darcy Parish, as both of them announced themselves as one of the most damaging midfield duos of the 2021 AFL season. This fact was made apparent in Essendon's round 11 win over the West Coast Eagles, where the duo would combine for 73 disposals, 13 inside-50s, 12 clearances, and 9 tackles. The performance would earn both Merrett and Parish 9 coaches votes each. After continuing his good form through to the midway point of the season, Merrett, on June 17 2021, re-signed with the Essendon Football Club on a 6-year deal until 2027. After finishing the 2021 home-and-away season with 694 disposals (going at an average of 31.5 disposals a game, ranked elite by Champion Data) and 103 tackles (going at an average of 4.7 tackles a game, ranked above average by Champion Data), Merrett was awarded with his second All-Australian blazer.

In 2022, Merrett had another consistent season, finishing runner-up in the Best and Fairest behind first-time winner Peter Wright. This was Merrett's sixth top-three finish in the Crichton Medal of his career, which included three wins.

On 21 February 2023, Merrett was named the captain of the Essendon Football Club, succeeding Dyson Heppell. Merrett won the Yiooken Award for his best-on-ground performance in Essendon's 1-point win over Richmond in the 2023 edition of Dreamtime at the 'G.

In 2024, Merrett won the Anzac Medal for his performance in the annual Anzac Day match against Collingwood, in a match that was drawn. Merrett would also win the Crichton Medal, his 5th club Best and Fairest.

At the conclusion of the 2025 season, it was reported that he had met with Hawthorn coach Sam Mitchell, in potential trade talks. Amid media speculation of his future at the club, Essendon president David Barham and coach Brad Scott both stated that Merrett was contracted, and they expected him to remain at the club. Weeks later, Merrett won his sixth Crichton Medal, with uncertainty and controversy still hanging over his head. Ultimately, after tense negotiations during the trade period, Essendon refused to trade him and held him to his contract. Merrett subsequently resigned from his position as captain of the team, after returning for pre-season.

Following the 2026 AFL season, where he would win his seventh Crichton Medal, Merrett finally got his wish to be traded to Hawthorn. He was traded on the first day of the AFL trade period, in exchange for picks 15, 25, and a future second round pick.

== Player profile ==
Merrett plays as an outside-inside midfielder with the ability to win the ball at the source of the contest. He was regarded as one of the best footy decision-makers out of the 2013 AFL draft pool and uses his left foot as a penetrating weapon to spot up teammates inside the 50 metre arc. Merrett is also known for his defensive work efforts and, as of the end of the 2025 season, averages over five tackles a game.

== Statistics ==
Updated to the end of 2026.

Legend
| G | Goals | K | Kicks | D | Disposals | T | Tackles |
| B | Behinds | H | Handballs | M | Marks |

| Season | Team | No. | Games | Totals | | | | | | | Averages (per game) | | | | | | | Votes |
| Season | Team | No. | Games | G | B | K | H | D | M | T | G | B | K | H | D | M | T | Votes |
|---|---|---|---|---|---|---|---|---|---|---|---|---|---|---|---|---|---|---|
| 2014 | Essendon | 27 | 20 | 11 | 2 | 170 | 134 | 304 | 67 | 79 | 0.6 | 0.1 | 8.5 | 6.7 | 15.2 | 3.4 | 4.0 | 0 |
| 2015 | Essendon | 7 | 17 | 4 | 4 | 186 | 195 | 381 | 60 | 98 | 0.2 | 0.2 | 10.9 | 11.5 | 22.4 | 3.5 | 5.8 | 1 |
| 2016 | Essendon | 7 | 22 | 7 | 7 | 349 | 308 | 657 | 110 | 136 | 0.3 | 0.3 | 15.9 | 14.0 | 29.9 | 5.0 | 6.2 | 19 |
| 2017 | Essendon | 7 | 22 | 9 | 8 | 382 | 277 | 659 | 95 | 122 | 0.4 | 0.4 | 17.4 | 12.6 | 30.0 | 4.3 | 5.5 | 15 |
| 2018 | Essendon | 7 | 22 | 5 | 7 | 281 | 309 | 590 | 69 | 132 | 0.2 | 0.3 | 12.8 | 14.0 | 26.8 | 3.1 | 6.0 | 10 |
| 2019 | Essendon | 7 | 23 | 8 | 10 | 338 | 313 | 651 | 90 | 124 | 0.3 | 0.4 | 14.7 | 13.6 | 28.3 | 3.9 | 5.4 | 16 |
| 2020 (Note: The 2020 season was played with 17 home-and-away matches per team (down from 22) and 16-minute quarters with time on (down from 20-minute quarters with time on) due to the impact of the COVID-19 pandemic.) | Essendon | 7 | 16 | 2 | 2 | 221 | 199 | 420 | 69 | 55 | 0.1 | 0.1 | 13.8 | 12.4 | 26.3 | 4.3 | 3.4 | 13 |
| 2021 | Essendon | 7 | 23 | 4 | 7 | 361 | 364 | 725 | 97 | 112 | 0.2 | 0.3 | 15.7 | 15.8 | 31.5 | 4.2 | 4.9 | 20 |
| 2022 | Essendon | 7 | 19 | 6 | 6 | 297 | 275 | 572 | 75 | 82 | 0.3 | 0.3 | 15.6 | 14.5 | 30.1 | 3.9 | 4.3 | 17 |
| 2023 | Essendon | 7 | 22 | 8 | 10 | 336 | 298 | 634 | 112 | 121 | 0.4 | 0.5 | 15.3 | 13.5 | 28.8 | 5.1 | 5.5 | 17 |
| 2024 | Essendon | 7 | 23 | 14 | 15 | 361 | 287 | 648 | 99 | 114 | 0.6 | 0.7 | 15.7 | 12.5 | 28.2 | 4.3 | 5.0 | 18 |
| 2025 | Essendon | 7 | 22 | 9 | 11 | 335 | 276 | 611 | 82 | 96 | 0.4 | 0.5 | 15.2 | 12.5 | 27.8 | 3.7 | 4.4 | 14 |
| 2026 | Essendon | 7 | 23 | 10 | 6 | 330 | 299 | 629 | 106 | 108 | 0.4 | 0.3 | 14.4 | 13.0 | 27.4 | 4.6 | 4.7 | 9 |
| Career | | | 274 | 97 | 95 | 3947 | 3534 | 7481 | 1131 | 1379 | 0.4 | 0.3 | 14.4 | 12.9 | 27.3 | 4.1 | 5.0 | 169 |

== Honours and achievements ==
- Essendon captain: 2023–2025
- 3× All-Australian team: 2017, 2021, 2023
- 7× Crichton Medal: 2016, 2019, 2021, 2023, 2024, 2025, 2026
- Anzac Medal: 2024
- Yiooken Award: 2023
- AFL Rising Star nominee: 2014
