= Elliott Kavanagh =

Australian rules footballer

Personal information
- Full name: Elliott Kavanagh
- Born: 19 May 1993 (age 33)
- Original team: Western Jets (TAC Cup)
- Draft: No. 19, 2011 National Draft
- Height: 187 cm (6 ft 2 in)
- Weight: 80 kg (176 lb)
- Position: Midfielder

Playing career^{1}
Years	Club	Games (Goals)
2012–2015	Essendon	12 (2)
- ^{1} Playing statistics correct to the end of 2015.

Elliott Kavanagh (born 19 May 1993) is a former professional Australian rules footballer who played for the Essendon Football Club in the Australian Football League (AFL). He was recruited by the club in the 2011 National Draft, with pick 19. Kavanagh made his debut in round 18, 2012, against Hawthorn at Docklands Stadium. He was delisted in October 2015.
