= 2012 Brownlow Medal =

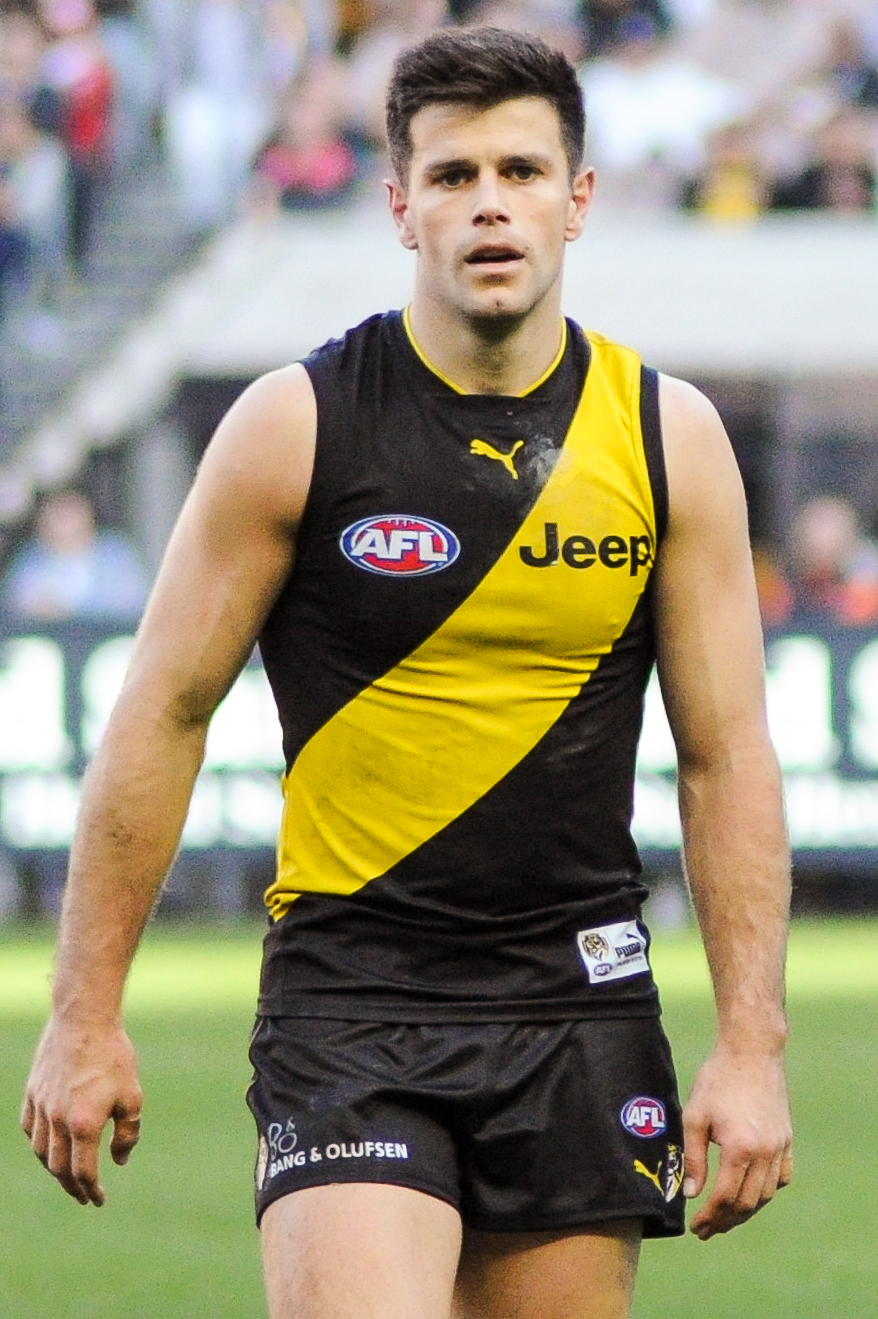
- Trent Cotchin, who shared the award with Sam Mitchell after Jobe Watson's medal was rescinded due to the Essendon Football Club supplements saga
- Date: 24 September
- Location: Crown Palladium
- Hosted by: Bruce McAvaney
- Winners: Trent Cotchin (Richmond); Sam Mitchell (Hawthorn)

Television/radio coverage
- Network: Seven Network; Fox Footy

The 2012 Brownlow Medal was the 85th year the award was presented to the player adjudged the fairest and best player during the Australian Football League (AFL) home-and-away season. The award was won jointly by Sam Mitchell of the Hawthorn Football Club and Trent Cotchin of the Richmond Football Club, each of whom polled 26 votes during the 2012 AFL season.

Jobe Watson of the Essendon Football Club originally received the medal by polling 30 votes. However, Watson and 33 of his Essendon teammates were later found guilty and suspended for using a banned substance during the 2012 season, under the club's sports science program, a scandal known as the Essendon supplements saga. On 15 November 2016, four years after initially receiving the medal, the AFL Commission ruled Watson retrospectively ineligible for the award due to the suspension he received, and awarded the medal jointly to Cotchin and Mitchell, the players with the next most votes.

== Leading vote-getters ==
	Player	Votes
	Jobe Watson (Essendon)*	30
=1st	Trent Cotchin (Richmond)	26
=1st	Sam Mitchell (Hawthorn)	26
=3rd	Scott Thompson (Adelaide)	25
=3rd	Dane Swan (Collingwood)	25
5th	Gary Ablett (Gold Coast)	24
6th	Patrick Dangerfield (Adelaide)	23
=7th	Dayne Beams (Collingwood)	19
=7th	Lenny Hayes (St Kilda)	19
=7th	Josh Kennedy (Sydney)	19
=10th	Kieren Jack (Sydney)	15
=10th	Scott Selwood (West Coast)	15
=10th	Scott Pendlebury (Collingwood)	15
	Matthew Pavlich (Fremantle)**	15

* Watson was retroactively deemed ineligible to win the Brownlow due to his involvement in the Essendon supplements saga.
** Pavlich was ineligible for the medal after being suspended during the home-and-away season.

== Voting procedure ==
The three field umpires (those umpires who control the flow of the game, as opposed to goal or boundary umpires) confer after each match and award three votes, two votes, and one vote to the players they regard as the best, second-best and third-best in the match, respectively. The votes are kept secret until the awards night, and they are read and tallied on the evening.

As the medal is awarded to the fairest and best player in the league, those who have been suspended during the season by the AFL Tribunal (or, who avoided suspension only because of a discount for a good record or an early guilty plea) are ineligible to win the award; however, they may still continue to poll votes. Notable players who were ineligible entering the count this season included, among others: former Brownlow Medallists Jimmy Bartel, Simon Black, Chris Judd and Adam Goodes, as well as Fremantle captain Matthew Pavlich.

== Effect of Essendon supplements saga ==
In February 2013, the Australian Sports Anti-Doping Authority (ASADA) and the World Anti-Doping Agency (WADA) began an investigation into the legality of Essendon's supplements program during the 2012 AFL season and the preceding preseason. Thirty-four Essendon players—including Watson—were suspected of taking the banned peptide Thymosin beta-4. This quickly led to debate over whether or not a guilty verdict would see Watson stripped of the medal. The investigation and court action stretched over the following four years. Initially, the AFL Tribunal delivered a not guilty verdict in March 2015, but on appeal in the Court of Arbitration for Sport (CAS), the players were found guilty in January 2016, resulting in the suspensions of all thirty-four players. An appeal lodged against that decision in the Federal Supreme Court of Switzerland was dismissed in October 2016.

Following the guilty verdict handed down by the CAS in January, it was announced the AFL Commission would meet in February to determine whether Watson would retain his Brownlow Medal; however, this decision was delayed until the outcome of the Federal Supreme Court appeal. The final decision regarding Jobe Watson's Brownlow medal win was decided by the AFL Commission in late November 2016, with Watson retrospectively ruled ineligible for the award, and the medal then awarded to the next highest vote-getters, Cotchin and Mitchell, under the normal rules regarding ineligible players; Watson had pre-empted the decision by announcing on 11 November 2016 that he would hand back the medal. The medals were presented to Cotchin and Mitchell in a small ceremony in Melbourne on 13 December 2016. Watson's physical medal was handed back to the AFL CEO Gillon McLachlan in early 2017, with no plans in place to re-present or display it as of February 2017.
