= Dylan Van Unen =

Australian rules footballer

Personal information
- Born: 22 June 1990 (age 36)
- Original team: Frankston
- Draft: No. 51, 2012 National Draft, Essendon
- Height: 188 cm (6 ft 2 in)
- Weight: 85 kg (187 lb)

Playing career^{1}
Years	Club	Games (Goals)
2014	Essendon	1 (0)
- ^{1} Playing statistics correct to the end of 2014.

Dylan Van Unen (born 22 June 1990) is a professional Australian rules footballer who played for the Essendon Football Club in the Australian Football League (AFL).

Van Unen was picked by Essendon with pick 51 of the 2012 National Draft. He made his debut against Fremantle in round 4 of the 2014 season.

Van Unen was delisted at the conclusion of the 2014 AFL season. He is of Lithuanian descent.
