= Brent Stanton =

Australian rules footballer (born 1986)

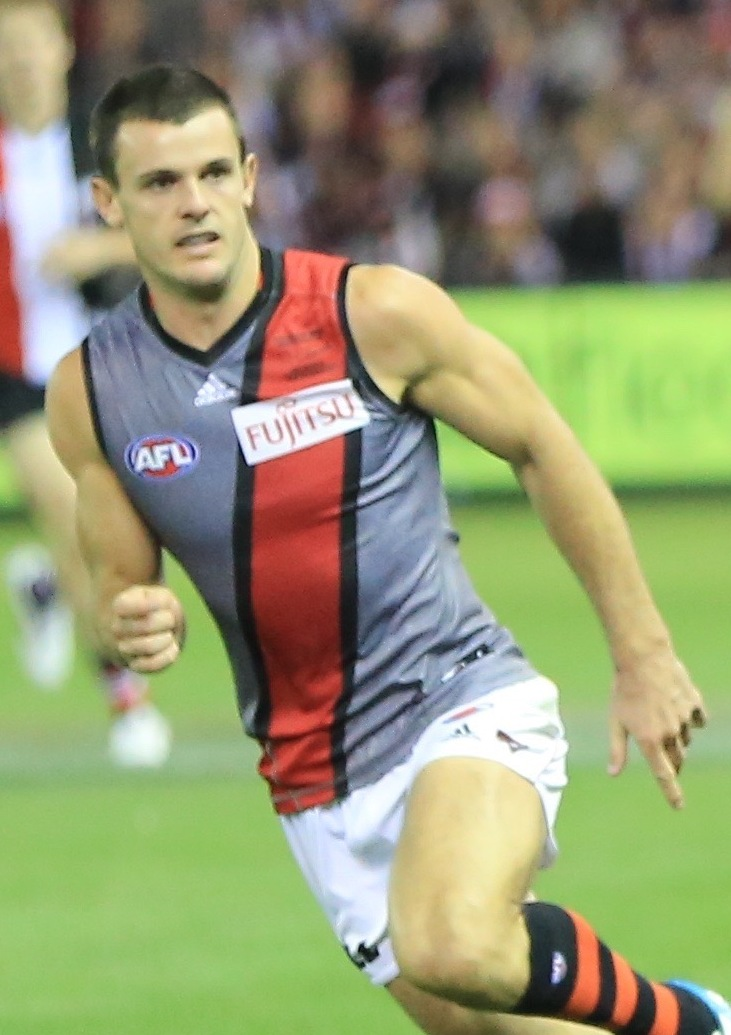
- Stanton playing for Essendon in May 2015

Personal information
- Full name: Brent Stanton
- Born: 1 May 1986 (age 40); Darwin, Australia
- Original team: Northern Knights (TAC Cup)
- Draft: No. 13, 2003 national draft
- Height: 183 cm (6 ft 0 in)
- Weight: 82 kg (181 lb)
- Position: Midfielder / defender

Playing career^{1}
Years	Club	Games (Goals)
2004–2017	Essendon	255 (158)

International team honours^{2}
Years	Team	Games (Goals)
2006	Australia	2 (1)
- ^{1} Playing statistics correct to the end of 2017.^{2} Representative statistics correct as of 2006.

Career highlights
- Archer–Hird Medal 2012; 2004 AFL Rising Star nominee

Brent Stanton (born 1 May 1986) is a retired professional Australian rules footballer who played his entire career for the Essendon Football Club in the Australian Football League (AFL).

== Early life ==
Stanton attended Banyule Primary School and Viewbank College. At the age of 16, Stanton was selected to play for the 2002 Northern Knights team in the TAC Cup. He played nine games, averaged 16 possessions and kicked 11 goals. Growing up, Stanton supported the Carlton Football Club.

== Playing career ==
=== 2000s ===
Stanton was drafted by Essendon with the thirteenth overall selection in the 2003 national draft, Essendon's second pick overall in the draft. Due to many key players being injured in the 2004 pre-season, Stanton was immediately brought into the Essendon team for the round 1 match against Port Adelaide where the Bombers were comfortably defeated by 96 points. Stanton was the round nomination for the Rising Star after the round 20 win against Collingwood.

Stanton started his 2005 season by changing to the number 24 jumper, previously worn by former Essendon great Joe Misiti. Stanton had a strong season, in the 19 games that he played, he averaged 18 possessions and kicked 13 goals. In just his second year of football he showed much improvement from his debut season, Stanton finished third in the 2005 Crichton Medal behind Mark Johnson and Jason Johnson with 253 votes.

Stanton worked hard during the pre-season, and was able to increase his physical size. During 2006, he played a different role on the wing, opposite Scott Camporeale. During a horror season which netted only three wins and a draw for Essendon (one of which was against reigning premiers Sydney), Stanton was one of only three players in the team who played in every game that season. Stanton averaged 22 possessions and kicked 12 goals finishing fourth in the 2006 Crichton Medal with 196 votes.

Stanton became a far more prominent player for the Bombers in 2007, he averaged a career-high 25 possessions in the first 10 rounds of the season. Stanton became renowned around the AFL for his endurance and quickly established himself as one of the club's key players and most dangerous midfielders. He finished off an impressive season by finishing sixth in the 2007 Crichton Medal with 197 votes.

In the 2008 pre-season, Stanton would be handed the number five guernsey, worn by retired club captain James Hird. Stanton struggled early in the season due to close checking from opposition players. Although he only averaged 22 possessions and kicked 18 goals in the season, his much-criticised tackling had improved vastly. Stanton finished third in the 2008 Crichton Medal, behind Matthew Lloyd and David Hille, with 188 votes.

In 2009, Stanton was a significant player in an Essendon team which went through the home and away season with 10 wins, 11 defeats and a draw. He played every game in the home and away season in which they qualified in eighth position for the finals series, losing the First Elimination Final to Adelaide by 96 points. Stanton polled a career high eight votes in the Brownlow Medal and finished third in the 2009 Crichton Medal behind, Dustin Fletcher and Jobe Watson with 284 votes. Stanton played his 100th AFL game in round 2 against Fremantle.

=== 2010s ===
Stanton was elected into the Essendon leadership group for the 2010 season. Stanton amassed 477 possessions and kicked 13 goals in 20 games for an Essendon team which won seven matches and lost fifteen in a year that would see their coach, Matthew Knights, sacked one day after the conclusion of the regular season. Stanton polled six votes in the Brownlow Medal and finished fifth in the 2010 Crichton Medal with 167 votes.

Stanton continued to improve during the year. Stanton led the club in kicks and handballs received and was in the top five for marks, handballs, inside-50s, rebound-50s and loose-ball gets. Into his ninth AFL season and in the Essendon leadership group, Stanton finished second in the 2011 Crichton Medal behind David Zaharakis. He played his 150th AFL game against Melbourne in Round 11.

Wearing the number 5, his running and ability to accumulate possessions contributed to every victory during the 2012 season. He has now polled a career high 14 votes in the 2012 Brownlow Medal.

In Round 6 of the 2012 AFL season, Stanton collected a record 193 Dream Team points in Essendon's win against the Brisbane Lions at Docklands Stadium. His statistics included: 39 disposals (from 32 kicks and 7 handballs), 17 marks and 8 tackles. As of 2015, it remains the highest Dream Team score by a midfielder.

Stanton played his 200th game in Round 20, 2013 against West Coast at Etihad Stadium.

Stanton, along with 33 other Essendon players, was found guilty of using a banned performance-enhancing substance, thymosin beta-4, as part of Essendon's sports supplements program during the 2012 season. He and his team-mates were initially found not guilty in March 2015 by the AFL Anti-Doping Tribunal, but a guilty verdict was returned in January 2016 after an appeal by the World Anti-Doping Agency. He was suspended for two years which, with backdating, ended in November 2016; as a result, he served approximately fourteen months of his suspension and missed the entire 2016 AFL season.

On 10 August 2016 Stanton re-committed to the Bombers on a one-year deal. Early in the 2017 season, Stanton played his 250th AFL game against the Brisbane Lions at the Gabba.

On 24 August 2017, Stanton announced that he would retire at the end of the 2017 season.

== Coaching career ==
=== Carlton Football Club ===
In 2018, Stanton joined the Carlton Football Club in an assistant coaching role as a development coach. He also plays for the Banyule Bears in the Northern Football League who were eliminated in their preliminary final after they were beaten by the Lower Plenty Jabba's.

In August 2021, at the end of the 2021 season, Stanton was sacked by Carlton as an assistant coach, due to a clean-out at the club, after an extensive review of the club's football operations.

=== Essendon Football Club ===
He subsequently returned to Essendon Football Club after being appointed its VFL coach. He was later appointed as an assistant coach of the AFL men's side, working alongside senior coach Brad Scott.

== Statistics ==
Statistics are correct to the end of 2014 season

Legend
G	Goals	K	Kicks	D	Disposals	T	Tackles
B	Behinds	H	Handballs	M	Marks

Season	Team	No.	Games	Totals							Averages (per game)						
Season	Team	No.	Games	G	B	K	H	D	M	T	G	B	K	H	D	M	T
2004	Essendon	34	15	6	6	110	41	151	47	20	0.4	0.4	7.3	2.7	10.1	3.1	1.3
2005	Essendon	24	19	13	9	252	100	352	123	39	0.7	0.5	13.3	5.3	18.5	6.5	2.0
2006	Essendon	24	22	12	18	332	153	485	134	41	0.6	0.8	15.1	7.0	22.0	6.1	1.9
2007	Essendon	24	20	11	5	322	147	469	139	28	0.6	0.2	16.1	7.4	23.4	7.0	1.4
2008	Essendon	5	22	18	13	321	165	486	122	72	0.8	0.6	14.6	7.5	22.1	5.6	3.3
2009	Essendon	5	23	15	13	329	243	572	139	87	0.6	0.6	14.3	10.6	24.9	6.0	3.8
2010	Essendon	5	20	13	8	285	192	477	122	81	0.6	0.4	14.2	9.6	23.8	6.1	4.0
2011	Essendon	5	21	15	14	343	178	521	107	116	0.7	0.7	16.3	8.5	24.8	5.1	5.5
2012	Essendon	5	20	13	9	359	137	496	129	86	0.6	0.4	18.0	6.8	24.8	6.4	4.3
2013	Essendon	5	21	14	11	362	162	524	112	81	0.7	0.5	17.2	7.7	25.0	5.3	3.9
2014	Essendon	5	23	17	13	347	187	534	139	86	0.7	0.6	15.1	8.1	23.2	6.0	3.7
Career			226	147	119	3362	1705	5067	1313	737	0.7	0.5	14.9	7.5	22.4	5.8	3.3
