= Ariel Steinberg =

Australian rules footballer (born 1992)

Personal information
- Full name: Ariel Steinberg
- Born: 26 August 1992 (age 34)
- Original teams: Mildura Imperials, Bendigo Pioneers
- Draft: 31st overall, 2010 national draft
- Height: 192 cm (6 ft 4 in)
- Weight: 86 kg (190 lb)
- Position: Forward

Playing career^{1}
Years	Club	Games (Goals)
2014–2015	Essendon	10 (0)
- ^{1} Playing statistics correct to the end of 2015.

Ariel Steinberg (born 26 August 1992 in Mildura, Victoria, Australia) is an Australian rules footballer who played for the Essendon Football Club in the Australian Football League (AFL). He made his senior debut against West Coast in round 21 of the 2014 season.

== AFL career ==
Steinberg was selected by Essendon with the thirty-first pick in the 2010 AFL draft in November 2010. Ariel was drafted from the Bendigo Pioneers in the TAC Cup having joined the Pioneers squad halfway through the 2010 season.

He started playing for the Bendigo Bombers in their 2011 season. He kicked 3 goals against Frankston on 17 April 2011. He kicked 5 goals against the Box Hill Hawks on 19 June 2011. He kicked four goals against the Werribee Tigers on 7 August 2011. He kicked three goals against the Northern Bullants on 4 September 2011. He scored 25 goals in 2011. He was delisted in October 2015.

Steinberg, along with 33 other Essendon players, was found guilty of using a banned performance-enhancing substance, thymosin beta-4, as part of Essendon's sports supplements program during the 2012 season. He and his teammates were initially found not guilty in March 2015 by the AFL Anti-Doping Tribunal, but a guilty verdict was returned in January 2016 after an appeal by the World Anti-Doping Agency. He was suspended for two years which, with backdating, ended in November 2016; as a result, he served approximately fourteen months of his suspension and missed the entire 2016 VFL season, during which time he had intended to play for VFL club Williamstown.

== Personal life ==
Growing up in Mildura, he supported the Essendon Football Club, and his hero was Matthew Lloyd. In 2009, Steinberg played gridiron in Alberta, Canada whilst on student exchange. In Canada, Steinberg was the punter for his high school, the McNally Tigers, and he also played regular Aussie Rules games for the Edmonton men's side and helped coach and umpire for the Emus women's team. Women's Australian rules Football in Edmonton now rapidly growing supplying half the women for the Canadian National team. He has two sisters, Hadassah and Yael, and brother Asher.
