= Josh Begley (footballer) =

Australian rules footballer

Personal information
- Full name: Joshua Begley
- Nickname: "Fridge"
- Born: 3 July 1998 (age 28)
- Original team: Eastern Ranges (TAC Cup)
- Draft: No. 31, 2016 national draft
- Height: 188 cm (6 ft 2 in)
- Weight: 89 kg (196 lb)
- Position: Forward / Midfielder

Club information
- Current club: Essendon
- Number: 16

Playing career^{1}
Years	Club	Games (Goals)
2017–2020	Essendon	17 (15)
- ^{1} Playing statistics correct to the end of 2020.

Joshua Begley (born 3 July 1998) is a professional Australian rules footballer who last played for the Essendon Football Club in the Australian Football League (AFL). He was recruited by the Essendon Football Club with the 31st overall selection in the 2016 national draft.

He made his debut in round 22 of the 2017 AFL season, in which he recorded thirteen disposals, seven marks, two goals and three goal assists in a thirty-three point win against Gold Coast at Metricon Stadium. His first 5 disposals in AFL football resulted in 2 goals and 3 score assists. He remained in the side for the final game of the season and played in Essendon's losing elimination final against Sydney in his third game, scoring two goals.

At the end of the 2020 AFL season, Begley was informed he would not be receiving a new contract, and would be delisted from the club. Since 2021 Begley has been playing for the Frankston Football Club in the Victorian Football League.
