= Lauchlan Dalgleish =

Australian rules footballer

Personal information
- Full name: Lauchlan James Dalgleish
- Born: 22 June 1993 (age 33)
- Original team: North Ballarat Rebels (TAC Cup)
- Draft: No. 11, 2012 Rookie Draft
- Height: 185 cm (6 ft 1 in)
- Weight: 77 kg (170 lb)
- Position: Defender

Playing career^{1}
Years	Club	Games (Goals)
2013–2015	Essendon	3 (1)
- ^{1} Playing statistics correct to the end of 2015.

Lauchlan Dalgleish (born 22 June 1993) is a former professional Australian rules footballer who played for the Essendon Football Club in the Australian Football League (AFL). He was recruited by Essendon with the 11th pick in the 2012 rookie draft. Dalgleish won the 120-metre Terang Gift in 12.25 seconds three days after missing out in the national draft and is known for his work ethic, speed and agility as a midfielder. He made his AFL debut in round 21 of the 2013 season, playing three games and kicking one goal for the season. In October 2013, the Essendon Football Club announced that Dalgleish had been promoted to the senior list for season 2014. He was delisted at the conclusion of the 2015 season, without having added to his 3 games in his debut season. He currently plays for the Drysdale Hawks in the Bellarine Football League.
