= Nick Kommer =

Australian rules footballer

Personal information
- Full name: Nicholas Kommer
- Born: 28 September 1990 (age 36); Perth
- Original team: East Perth (WAFL)
- Draft: No. 73, 2012 national draft
- Height: 184 cm (6 ft 0 in)
- Weight: 78 kg (172 lb)

Playing career^{1}
Years	Club	Games (Goals)
2013–2016	Essendon	22 (13)
- ^{1} Playing statistics correct to the end of 2016.

Nicholas Kommer (born 28 September 1990) is a former professional Australian rules footballer who played for the Essendon Football Club in the Australian Football League (AFL). Kommer was recruited from East Perth in the West Australian Football League (WAFL), he was selected by Essendon with the seventy-third overall pick in the 2012 national draft. He made his AFL debut in the season-opening game against Adelaide in 2013. He was delisted at the end of the 2016 season.

Kommer now works at Servite College, Tuart Hill as a teacher.

== Statistics ==
Legend
G	Goals	K	Kicks	D	Disposals	T	Tackles
B	Behinds	H	Handballs	M	Marks

Season	Team	No.	Games	Totals							Averages (per game)						
Season	Team	No.	Games	G	B	K	H	D	M	T	G	B	K	H	D	M	T
2013	Essendon	38	19	10	8	114	103	217	55	62	0.5	0.4	6.0	5.4	11.4	2.9	3.3
2014	Essendon	38	0	—	—	—	—	—	—	—	—	—	—	—	—	—	—
2015	Essendon	38	0	—	—	—	—	—	—	—	—	—	—	—	—	—	—
2016	Essendon	38	3	3	1	12	14	26	8	5	1.0	0.3	4.0	4.7	8.7	2.7	1.7
Career			22	13	9	126	117	243	63	67	0.6	0.4	5.7	5.3	11.0	2.9	3.0
