= Jason Ashby =

Australian rules footballer

Personal information
- Full name: Jason Ashby
- Born: 16 May 1994 (age 32)
- Original team: Oakleigh Chargers (TAC Cup)
- Draft: No. 34, 2012 national draft
- Height: 187 cm (6 ft 2 in)
- Weight: 84 kg (185 lb)
- Position: Defender / Midfielder

Playing career^{1}
Years	Club	Games (Goals)
2013–2016	Essendon	12 (0)
- ^{1} Playing statistics correct to the end of 2016.

Jason Ashby (born 16 May 1994) is a professional Australian rules footballer with the Essendon Football Club in the Australian Football League (AFL).

Ashby attended Carey Baptist Grammar School, and played for the Oakleigh Chargers in the TAC Cup. He was recruited by Essendon with the 34th overall selection in the 2012 national draft and made his debut against Carlton in round 3, 2014. At the conclusion of the 2016 season, he was delisted.

== Statistics ==
Legend
G	Goals	K	Kicks	D	Disposals	T	Tackles
B	Behinds	H	Handballs	M	Marks

Season	Team	No.	Games	Totals							Averages (per game)						
Season	Team	No.	Games	G	B	K	H	D	M	T	G	B	K	H	D	M	T
2014	Essendon	14	5	0	0	30	33	63	12	9	0.0	0.0	6.0	6.6	12.6	2.4	1.8
2015	Essendon	14	5	0	0	17	19	36	9	15	0.0	0.0	3.4	3.8	7.2	1.8	3.0
2016	Essendon	14	2	0	0	12	11	23	2	8	0.0	0.0	6.0	5.5	11.5	1.0	4.0
Career			12	0	0	59	63	122	23	32	0.0	0.0	4.9	5.3	10.2	1.9	2.7
