= Will Hams =

Australian rules footballer

Personal information
- Full name: William Hams
- Born: 14 July 1994 (age 32)
- Original team: Gippsland Power (TAC Cup)
- Draft: No. 6, 2013 pre-season draft
- Height: 180 cm (5 ft 11 in)
- Weight: 76 kg (168 lb)
- Position: Midfielder

Playing career^{1}
Years	Club	Games (Goals)
2013–2016	Essendon	13 (4)
- ^{1} Playing statistics correct to the end of 2016.

Career highlights
- VFL premiership player: 2018

William "Will" Hams (born 14 July 1994) is an Australian rules footballer who currently plays for the Box Hill Hawks in the Victorian Football League. He previously played for the Essendon Football Club in the Australian Football League (AFL). Originally from Sale, Victoria, he was drafted with Essendon's only pick in the 2013 pre-season draft with pick 6. He made his debut in round 10, 2013 against Sydney at the Sydney Cricket Ground as the substitute.

He was delisted in November 2015, however, he was re-drafted in the 2016 rookie draft. At the conclusion of the 2016 season, he was delisted again by Essendon.

On 20 December 2016, Hams joined the Box Hill Hawks.

== Statistics ==
Legend
G	Goals	K	Kicks	D	Disposals	T	Tackles
B	Behinds	H	Handballs	M	Marks

Season	Team	No.	Games	Totals							Averages (per game)						
Season	Team	No.	Games	G	B	K	H	D	M	T	G	B	K	H	D	M	T
2013	Essendon	41	2	0	0	1	6	7	0	2	0.0	0.0	0.5	3.0	3.5	0.0	1.0
2014	Essendon	41	0	—	—	—	—	—	—	—	—	—	—	—	—	—	—
2015	Essendon	41	3	0	2	8	8	16	1	6	0.0	0.7	2.7	2.7	5.3	0.3	2.0
2016	Essendon	41	8	4	2	56	55	111	33	27	0.5	0.3	7.0	6.9	13.9	4.1	3.4
Career			13	4	4	65	69	134	34	35	0.3	0.3	5.0	5.3	10.3	2.6	2.7

== Honours and achievements ==
Team

- VFL premiership player: 2018
