= Patrick Ambrose =

Australian rules footballer

Personal information
- Full name: Patrick Ambrose
- Born: 1 September 1991 (age 35)
- Original teams: Old Xaverians (VAFA); Essendon reserves (VFL)
- Draft: No. 26, 2014 rookie draft
- Height: 193 cm (6 ft 4 in)
- Weight: 92 kg (203 lb)
- Position: Defender / forward

Playing career^{1}
Years	Club	Games (Goals)
2014–2021	Essendon	88 (23)
- ^{1} Playing statistics correct to the end of round 12, 2021.

Patrick Ambrose (born 1 September 1991) is a former professional Australian rules footballer who played for the Essendon Football Club in the Australian Football League (AFL). After playing with the Bombers reserves team in the Victorian Football League (VFL), he was recruited by Essendon with the twenty-sixth pick in the 2014 rookie draft and was elevated to the main team list prior to the start of the 2014 season, replacing Alex Browne. He made his debut against North Melbourne in round 1 of the 2014 season.

Ambrose is currently studying a Bachelor of Environmental Science (Environmental Management and Sustainability) at Deakin University.
