= David Hille =

Australian rules footballer, born 1981

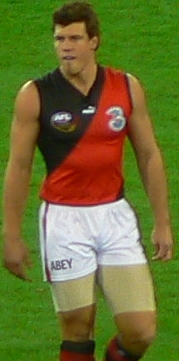

Personal information
- Full name: David Barry Hille
- Born: 2 June 1981 (age 45)
- Original team: Dandenong Stingrays (TAC Cup)
- Draft: No. 40, 1999 National Draft, Essendon
- Height: 202 cm (6 ft 8 in)
- Weight: 108 kg (238 lb)
- Position: Ruckman

Playing career^{1}
Years	Club	Games (Goals)
2001–2013	Essendon	197 (153)
- ^{1} Playing statistics correct to the end of 2013.

Career highlights
- W. S. Crichton Medal 2008; Yiooken Award 2010

David Barry Hille (born 2 June 1981) is a former Australian rules footballer with the Essendon Football Club.

== Early life ==
In his senior year at high school, Hille and seven other schoolmates from Peninsula Grammar lodged themselves into a station wagon and crashed it 500m up the road from where they took off in South Frankston. Three of the boys in the car were killed, and the other three seriously injured, but Hille was not injured. The accident report claims that Hille was wearing his seatbelt, which is why he has appeared on commercials about buckling up when driving.

== Football career ==
He made his debut in 2001 with the Essendon Football Club and proved to be a solid ruckman for a number of years. In 2006, Hille was appointed stand-in captain after Matthew Lloyd suffered a season-ending hamstring injury in round three.

He captained his first game in Round 6, 2006. From 2007 to 2012, he held the role of vice-captain of the Essendon Football Club which he shared with Mark McVeigh for the most part.

In the Round 17, 2006 clash between Essendon and Brisbane Lions (the first match Essendon won under his captaincy, and since the beginning of April that year), Brisbane ruckman Jamie Charman fell heavily in a contest, seriously injuring his shoulder. The image of David Hille comforting his opponent whilst medical help arrived was often replayed by the football media as a rare example of sportsmanship in such a competitive game.

At the 2008 Essendon Best and Fairest, Hille swept the floor by taking the most prestigious award of the night, the 'Best and Fairest'. Hille also came away with the 'Cheersquad award'.

Hille suffered a knee injury in the second minute of the Bombers' annual ANZAC Day match against Collingwood in Round 5, 2009. Scans confirmed he had ruptured his anterior cruciate ligament, requiring a full knee construction and ending his season.

== Retirement ==
On 29 August 2013, Hille announced his intention to retire from AFL Football at season's end. Hille's career at Essendon included captaining the team in 2006 in the absence of injured forward and captain Matthew Lloyd, winning Essendon's best and fairest, the W.S. Crichton Medal, in 2008 and winning the Yiooken Award in 2010, awarded for being adjudged best on ground in the annual Dreamtime at the 'G match between Essendon and Richmond.

Hille, along with 33 other Essendon players, was found guilty of using a banned performance-enhancing substance, thymosin beta-4, as part of Essendon's sports supplements program during the 2012 season. He and his team-mates were initially found not guilty in March 2015 by the AFL Anti-Doping Tribunal, but a guilty verdict was returned in January 2016 after an appeal by the World Anti-Doping Agency. He was suspended for two years which, with backdating, ended in November 2016, although by this stage had already retired from football at all levels.

On 13 November 2026, Hille joined the Greater Western Sydney Giants as a part-time ruck coach.

== Personal life ==
Studied a Bachelor of Business at RMIT University and currently lives in Sydney with his wife Kirsty. David and Kirsty have a two-year-old daughter, Matilda and will soon have a second child. David completed postgraduate studies at Sydney University and now works for Deloitte as a senior analyst.

== Statistics ==
Statistics are correct to Round 6 of the 2013 season.

Season	Team	No.	Games	Totals							Averages (per game)						
Season	Team	No.	Games	G	B	K	H	D	M	T	G	B	K	H	D	M	T
2001	Essendon	34	6	1	3	23	12	35	13	3	0.2	0.5	3.8	2.0	5.8	2.2	0.5
2002	Essendon	34	19	11	10	100	65	165	77	27	0.6	0.5	5.3	3.4	8.7	4.0	1.4
2003	Essendon	19	24	20	14	171	91	262	78	32	0.8	0.6	7.1	3.8	10.9	3.2	1.3
2004	Essendon	19	23	25	18	149	92	241	83	29	1.1	0.8	6.5	4.0	10.5	3.6	1.3
2005	Essendon	19	13	10	7	83	100	183	56	19	0.8	0.5	6.4	7.7	14.1	4.3	1.5
2006	Essendon	19	21	13	15	136	164	300	92	29	0.6	0.7	6.5	7.8	14.3	4.4	1.4
2007	Essendon	19	18	7	8	113	115	228	70	33	0.4	0.4	6.3	6.4	12.7	3.9	1.8
2008	Essendon	19	20	19	18	177	147	324	103	34	1.0	0.9	8.8	7.4	16.2	5.2	1.7
2009	Essendon	19	5	1	3	25	34	59	15	4	0.2	0.6	5.0	6.8	11.8	3.0	0.8
2010	Essendon	19	16	16	11	123	139	262	90	24	1.0	0.7	7.7	8.7	16.4	5.6	1.5
2011	Essendon	19	19	20	13	147	149	296	110	27	1.0	0.7	7.7	7.8	15.6	5.8	1.4
2012	Essendon	19	9	9	7	73	54	127	47	10	1.0	0.8	8.1	6.0	14.1	5.2	1.1
2013	Essendon	19	3	1	4	24	20	44	10	3	0.3	1.3	8.0	6.7	14.7	3.3	1
Career			196	153	131	1344	1182	2526	844	274	0.8	0.7	6.9	6.0	12.9	4.3	1.4

Legend
G	Goals	K	Kicks	D	Disposals	T	Tackles
B	Behinds	H	Handballs	M	Marks
