= Jackson Merrett =

Australian rules footballer (born 1993)

Personal information
- Full name: Jackson Merrett
- Born: 27 February 1993 (age 33)
- Original team: Geelong Falcons (TAC Cup)
- Draft: No. 31, 2011 national draft
- Height: 185 cm (6 ft 1 in)
- Weight: 84 kg (185 lb)
- Position: Midfielder / Forward

Playing career^{1}
Years	Club	Games (Goals)
2012–2018	Essendon	56 (23)
- ^{1} Playing statistics correct to the end of 2018.

Jackson Merrett (born 27 February 1993) is a former professional Australian rules footballer who played for the Essendon Football Club in the Australian Football League (AFL). He was recruited by the Essendon Football Club with the 31st overall selection in the 2011 national draft. He made his AFL debut against Collingwood at the Melbourne Cricket Ground in round 23 of the 2012 AFL season. He is the older brother and former teammate of Zach Merrett.

Merrett was delisted at the end of the 2018 season. He played for Peel Thunder in the WAFL until 2021 and currently plays for East Point in the Ballarat Football League.
