= Mark Baguley =

Australian rules footballer

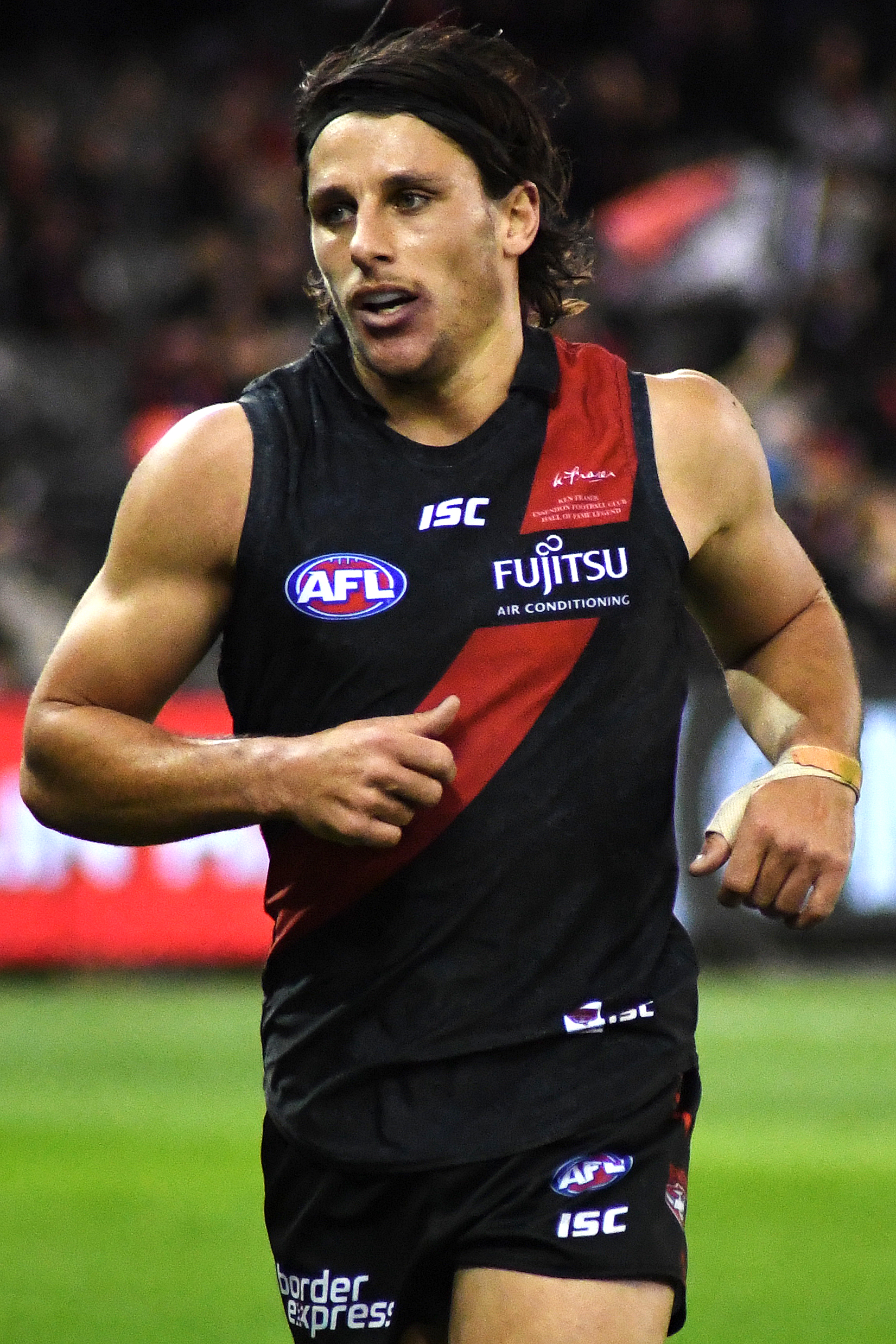
- Baguley playing for Essendon in August 2018

Personal information
- Full name: Mark Baguley
- Born: 21 May 1987 (age 39)
- Original team: Frankston (VFL)
- Draft: No. 47, 2012 rookie draft
- Height: 178 cm (5 ft 10 in)
- Weight: 81 kg (179 lb)
- Position: Defender / Forward

Playing career^{1}
Years	Club	Games (Goals)
2012–2019	Essendon	134 (35)
- ^{1} Playing statistics correct to the end of 2019.

Mark Baguley (born 21 May 1987) is a former professional Australian rules footballer who played for the Essendon Football Club in the Australian Football League (AFL). Baguley played local footy with Langwarrin before joining Frankston in 2009 as a 21-year-old. He played there for three seasons, coming second in their best and fairest in 2011. He was recruited as a mature-age rookie by Essendon with pick 47 in the 2012 rookie draft. In July 2012 he was elevated to the senior list. He debuted in round 16 against Port Adelaide at AAMI Stadium.

In 2024, Mark Baguley was named at Number 97 in Don The Stat's Countdown of the Top 100 Essendon Players since 1980.

== Statistics ==
Statistics are correct to the end of round 4 of the 2017 season

Legend
G	Goals	K	Kicks	D	Disposals	T	Tackles
B	Behinds	H	Handballs	M	Marks

Season	Team	No.	Games	Totals							Averages (per game)						
Season	Team	No.	Games	G	B	K	H	D	M	T	G	B	K	H	D	M	T
2012	Essendon	46	7	0	0	71	42	113	28	15	0.0	0.0	10.1	6.0	16.1	4.0	2.1
2013	Essendon	46	21	2	1	177	159	336	111	59	0.1	0.0	8.4	7.6	16.0	5.3	2.8
2014	Essendon	12	22	0	2	234	162	396	138	71	0.0	0.1	10.6	7.4	18.0	6.3	3.2
2015	Essendon	12	22	0	0	212	171	383	135	84	0.0	0.0	9.6	7.8	17.4	6.1	3.8
2016	Essendon	12	10	1	3	103	72	175	63	35	0.1	0.3	10.3	7.2	17.5	6.3	3.5
2017	Essendon	12	4	0	0	38	18	56	26	13	0.0	0.0	9.5	4.5	14.0	6.5	3.3
Career			86	3	6	835	624	1459	501	277	0.0	0.1	9.7	7.3	17.0	5.8	3.2
