= David Zaharakis =

Australian rules footballer

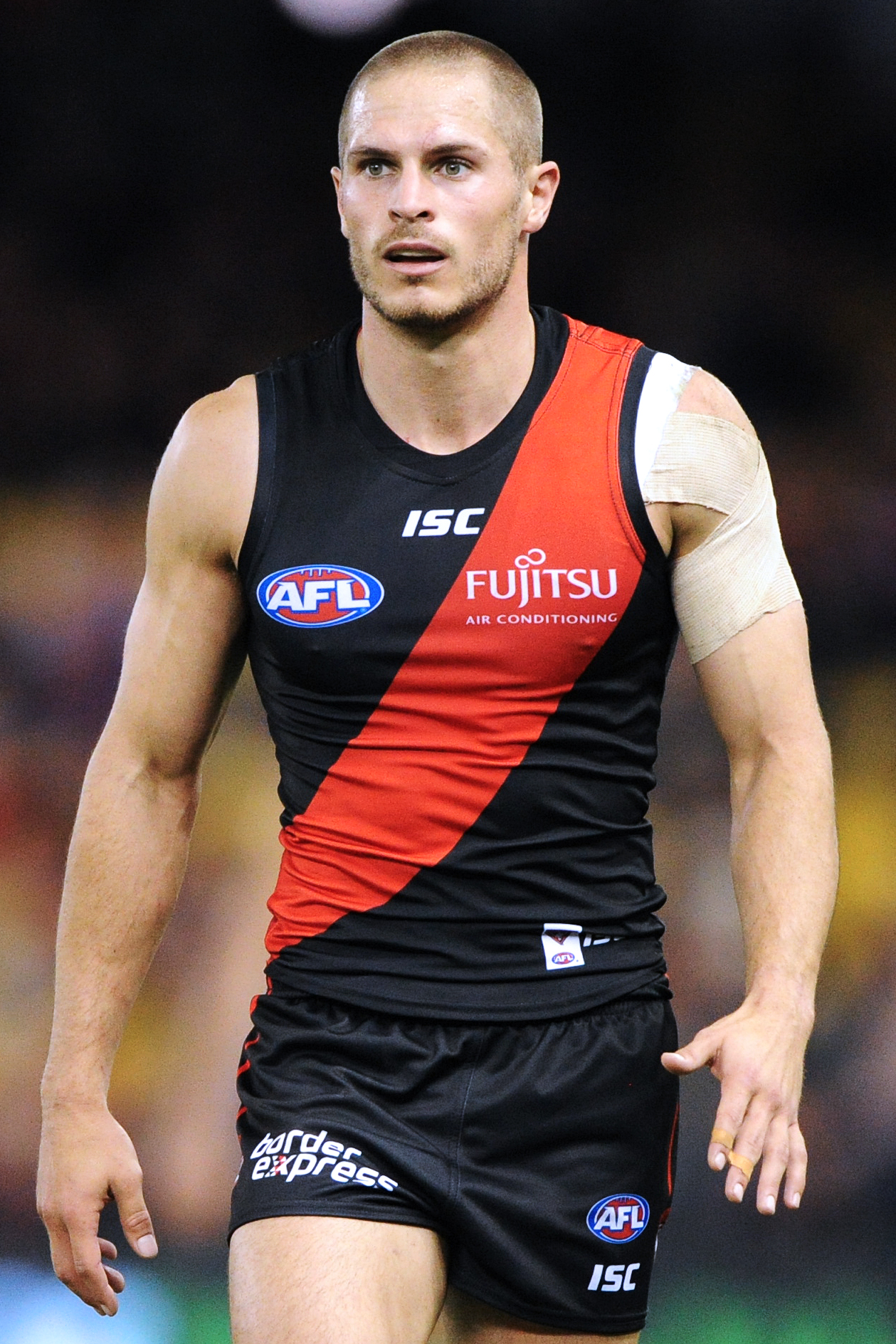
- Zaharakis playing for Essendon in April 2018

Personal information
- Full name: David Zaharakis
- Born: 21 February 1990 (age 36)
- Original team: Northern Knights (TAC Cup)
- Draft: No. 23, 2008 national draft
- Height: 180 cm (5 ft 11 in)
- Weight: 79 kg (174 lb)
- Position: Midfielder

Playing career
Years	Club	Games (Goals)
2009–2021	Essendon	226 (136)

Career highlights
- Anzac Day Medal: 2013; W.S. Crichton Medal: 2011; 22under22 team: 2012; AFL Rising Star nominee: 2009

David Zaharakis (born 21 February 1990) is a former professional Australian rules footballer who played 13 seasons for the Essendon Football Club in the Australian Football League (AFL).

== Early life ==
Zaharakis grew up in Eltham, he attended Our Lady Help of Christians Primary School and finished Year 12 in 2008 at Marcellin College, where he also won the Terrence Cleary Memorial Sporting Award for sportsmanship and sporting excellence. He played for the Northern Knights in the TAC Cup and junior football for Eltham Panthers in the Northern Football League. He was named in the under-18 All-Australian team, playing for Vic Metro.

== AFL career ==
Zaharakis was drafted by Essendon with pick 23 in the 2008 National Draft, whom he supported growing up. He was awarded the number 11 guernsey, which was previously worn by Damien Peverill. He made his debut against Fremantle in Round 2, 2009, and earned the Rising Star nomination on debut. In Round 5, 2009, against Collingwood at the age of 19, he kicked the match-winning goal during the final seconds of the Anzac Day match to help the Bombers win by five points.

During 2011, he was able to make the most of his opportunity in the midfield, with the ability to move forward and kick over 30 goals for the season, winning the W.S. Crichton Medal in the process.

In Round 5, 2013, he won the Anzac Day Medal, where he recorded 34 disposals and kicked four goals. It was revealed by his manager during 2013 that he did not take any part in Essendon's 2012 controversial sport science program that placed the club under scrutiny by the AFL and ASADA (Australian Sports Anti-Doping Authority) due to him suffering from a fear of needles. As a result, Zaharakis was found not guilty of using banned substances by the Court of Arbitration for Sport, and was therefore able to participate in the 2016 season.

He was delisted at the end of the 2021 season, but he was enlisted as a COVID top-up player for the Melbourne Football Club for the 2022 season; however, he did not end up playing any games for them.

== Personal life ==
Zaharakis is currently studying a Bachelor of Property and Real Estate at Deakin University. In November 2022, it was announced that Zaharakis was cast for Australian Survivor: Heroes V Villains as a member of the Heroes tribe. He made the merge, but was the first person voted out from the merged tribe on Day 29, finishing in twelfth place.

In 2026 he showcased AFL athleticism to the world by competing at the World Ironman Championships at Kona, IH, completing in excellent time despite humid conditions that saw many competitors fail to finish.

== Statistics ==
Statistics are correct to the end of the 2021 season.

Legend
G	Goals	K	Kicks	D	Disposals	T	Tackles
B	Behinds	H	Handballs	M	Marks

Season	Team	No.	Games	Totals							Averages (per game)							Votes
Season	Team	No.	Games	G	B	K	H	D	M	T	G	B	K	H	D	M	T	Votes
2009	Essendon	11	10	7	8	87	50	137	47	25	0.7	0.8	8.7	5.0	13.7	4.7	2.5	0
2010	Essendon	11	20	19	18	178	141	319	93	52	1.0	0.9	8.9	7.0	16.0	4.6	2.6	0
2011	Essendon	11	23	31	17	277	195	472	103	88	1.4	0.7	12.0	8.5	20.5	4.5	3.8	4
2012	Essendon	11	13	7	8	171	119	290	43	42	0.5	0.6	13.2	9.2	22.3	3.3	3.2	0
2013	Essendon	11	21	9	17	266	210	476	73	62	0.4	0.8	12.7	10.0	22.7	3.5	3.0	4
2014	Essendon	11	23	14	14	332	228	560	108	85	0.6	0.6	14.4	9.9	24.4	4.7	3.7	8
2015	Essendon	11	16	9	3	149	151	300	59	63	0.6	0.2	9.3	9.4	18.8	3.7	3.9	0
2016	Essendon	11	21	5	6	281	241	522	75	99	0.2	0.3	13.4	11.5	24.9	3.6	4.7	6
2017	Essendon	11	23	11	14	323	267	590	107	107	0.5	0.6	14.0	11.6	25.7	4.7	4.7	11
2018	Essendon	11	17	7	6	240	195	435	85	62	0.4	0.4	14.1	11.5	25.6	5.0	3.7	6
2019	Essendon	11	20	6	2	238	168	406	99	56	0.3	0.1	11.9	8.4	20.3	5.0	2.8	3
2020	Essendon	11	10	9	4	63	79	142	24	20	0.9	0.4	6.3	7.9	14.2	2.4	2.0	4
2021	Essendon	11	7	1	2	43	28	71	18	14	0.1	0.2	6.1	4.0	10.1	2.5	2.0	0
Career			226	136	119	2648	2072	4720	934	775	0.6	0.5	11.8	9.2	21.0	4.1	3.4	46
