= Dyson Heppell =

Australian rules footballer (born 1992)

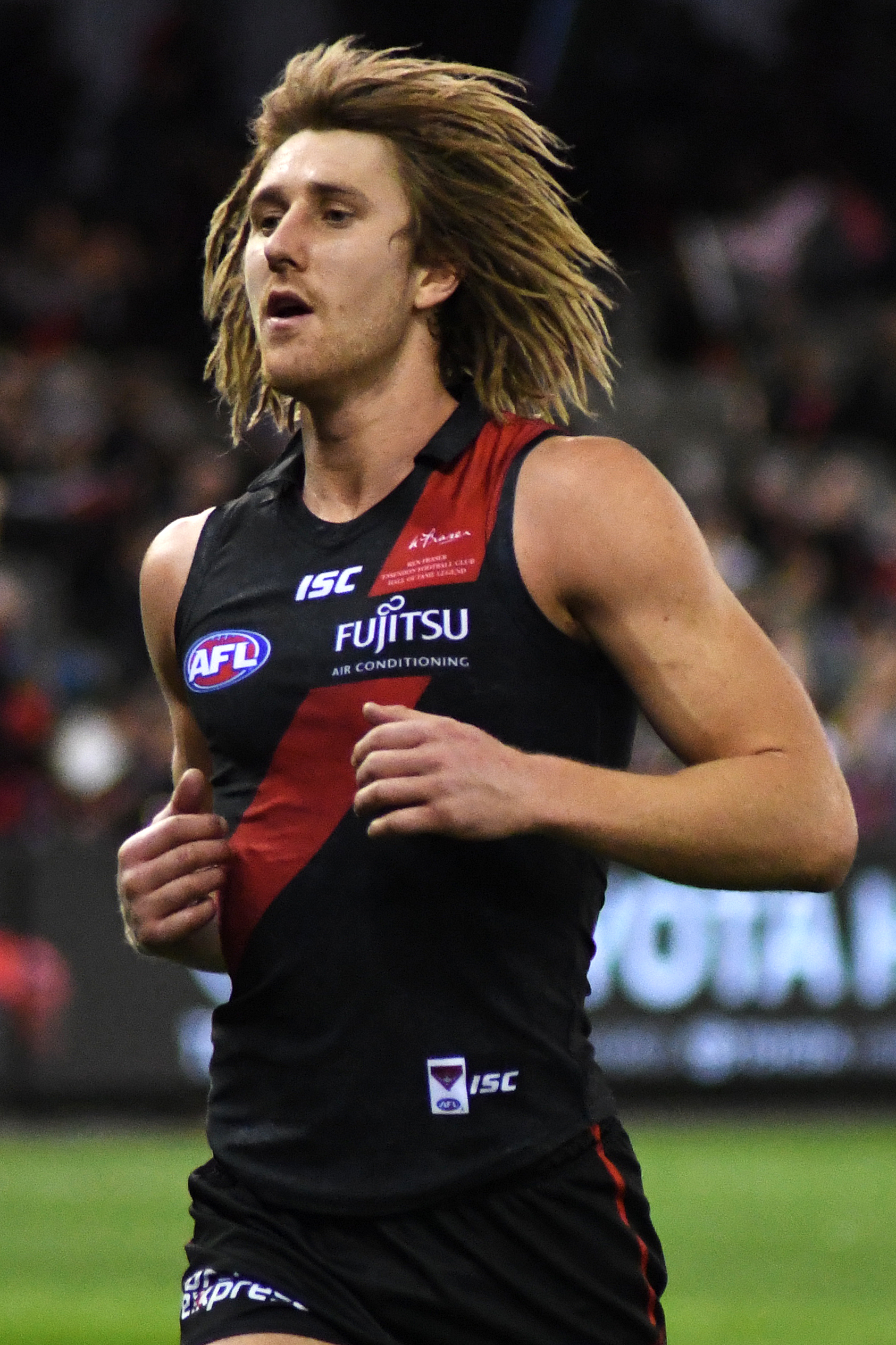
- Heppell playing for Essendon in 2018

Personal information
- Full name: Dyson Turner-Heppell
- Born: 14 May 1992 (age 34); Leongatha, Victoria
- Original team: Gippsland Power (TAC Cup)
- Draft: No. 8, 2010 national draft
- Debut: Round 1, 2011, Essendon vs. Western Bulldogs, at Etihad Stadium
- Height: 189 cm (6 ft 2 in)
- Weight: 87 kg (192 lb)
- Position: Midfielder / defender

Playing career
Years	Club	Games (Goals)
2011–2024	Essendon	253 (68)

International team honours
Years	Team	Games (Goals)
2015	Australia	1 (0)

Career highlights
- Essendon captain: 2017–2022; All-Australian team: 2014; Crichton Medal: 2014; Ron Evans Medal: 2011; AFLPA best first-year player: 2011; AFLCA best young player of the year: 2012

Dyson Turner-Heppell (né Heppell; born 14 May 1992) is a former professional Australian rules footballer who played for the Essendon Football Club in the Australian Football League (AFL). Heppell won the AFL Rising Star award in his first season in 2011, and won a Crichton Medal and All-Australian selection in 2014. He served as Essendon captain from 2017 to 2022.

== Early life ==
Heppell participated in the Auskick program at Leongatha. He began playing football with Leongatha Football Club, and played for Gippsland Power in the TAC Cup for the 2009 and 2010 seasons. Named as Gippsland's captain for the 2010 season, Heppell also played for the Victorian Country side at the 2010 AFL Under 18 Championships, where he was named in the All-Australian team. At 189 cm, he played as a "line-breaking defender" for the first half of the 2010 season, before moving into the midfield for the second half of the season.

Heppell finished strongly in the Morrish Medal count, which is awarded to the best and fairest player in the TAC Cup regular season, eventually tying for the award with Jackson Sketcher of the Sandringham Dragons, after achieving the maximum votes possible from rounds 13 to 17. Despite finishing the regular season in sixth place on the ladder, both Gippsland and Heppell had a good finals series. He accumulated 36 disposals in an elimination final victory and was named best on ground in the preliminary final win to qualify for the TAC Cup Grand Final. In a stark contrast to the rest of his season, Heppell had a relatively poor game in the grand final, gathering only 20 touches, as the Power were outclassed by the Calder Cannons by 56 points.

== AFL career ==
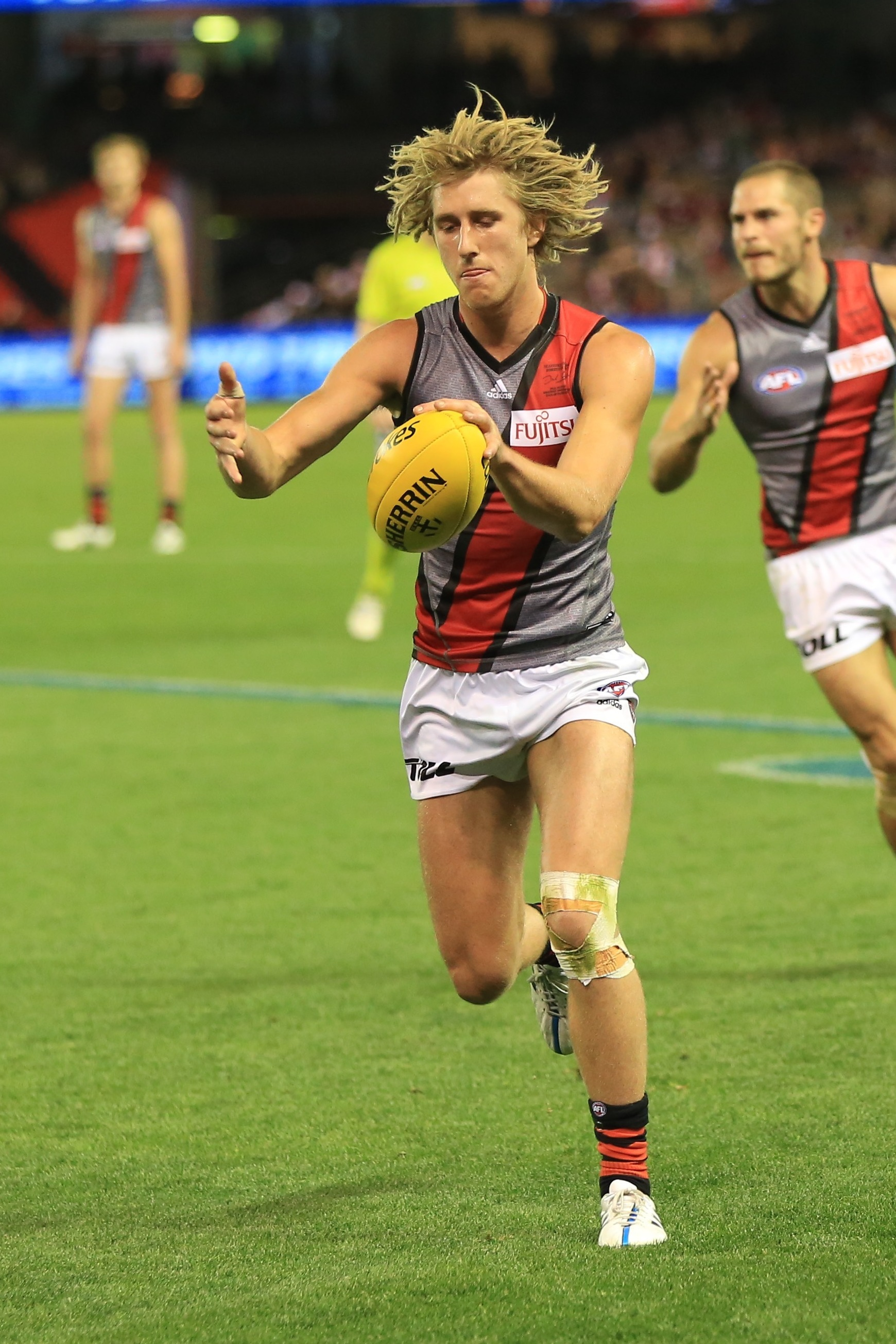
Heppell kicking for goal in 2015

Despite his performance in the grand final, Heppell was an impressive performer at the AFL draft camp, and was touted by many as being a potential top five draft pick in the 2010 national draft, with some even claiming he could go as high as top three. Most speculation suggested that the Brisbane Lions would select Heppell with pick five, who with his "silky" skills and raking left foot, modelled his style on the Lions' own Josh Drummond.

In the week before the draft, however, a rumour, which Heppell denied, began circulating that he was suffering from groin problems. Due to this, Essendon, which had the eighth selection, became interested that he might fall to their pick, and Heppell spoke to newly appointed coach, James Hird, days before the draft. Hird, who said he had been interested in Heppell for months, believed that Heppell would be selected well before Essendon had the chance to draft him, but when Heppell did slide back due to the groin concerns, Essendon selected him ahead of midfielders Dion Prestia and Shaun Atley. Heppell, who supported the Bombers as a child and had "idolised" Hird while growing up, said that getting drafted by Essendon was "like a dream".

Heppell received the first Rising Star nomination for 2011 after recording 20 possessions in his debut AFL match, against the Western Bulldogs in round 1. In his first season, he played every match of the home and away season and was described as a major contributor in helping Essendon make the finals. Throughout the year, and leading into the vote count, Heppell was widely considered to be the favourite for the Ron Evans Medal, awarded to the rising star of each season. He won the medal, polling 44 of a possible 45 votes and became the first Essendon player to win the award. Heppell described winning the award as "a dream come true".

He continued his ascent as an emerging star by finishing third in the clubs best and fairest award count, Essendon's best and fairest award; his second consecutive top-three placing. Having played his first two seasons largely off half-back, Heppell moved into a ball-winning role in the midfield in 2013, averaging 24 disposals for the season. He polled three Brownlow Medal votes for his 36-possession and two-goal effort against Melbourne in round 2 and was in the best players for the comeback win over Carlton in round 11.

Heppell continued his upward climb throughout the 2014 season, winning his maiden Crichton Medal, receiving his first selection in the All-Australian team, and polled 14 votes in the 2014 Brownlow Medal.

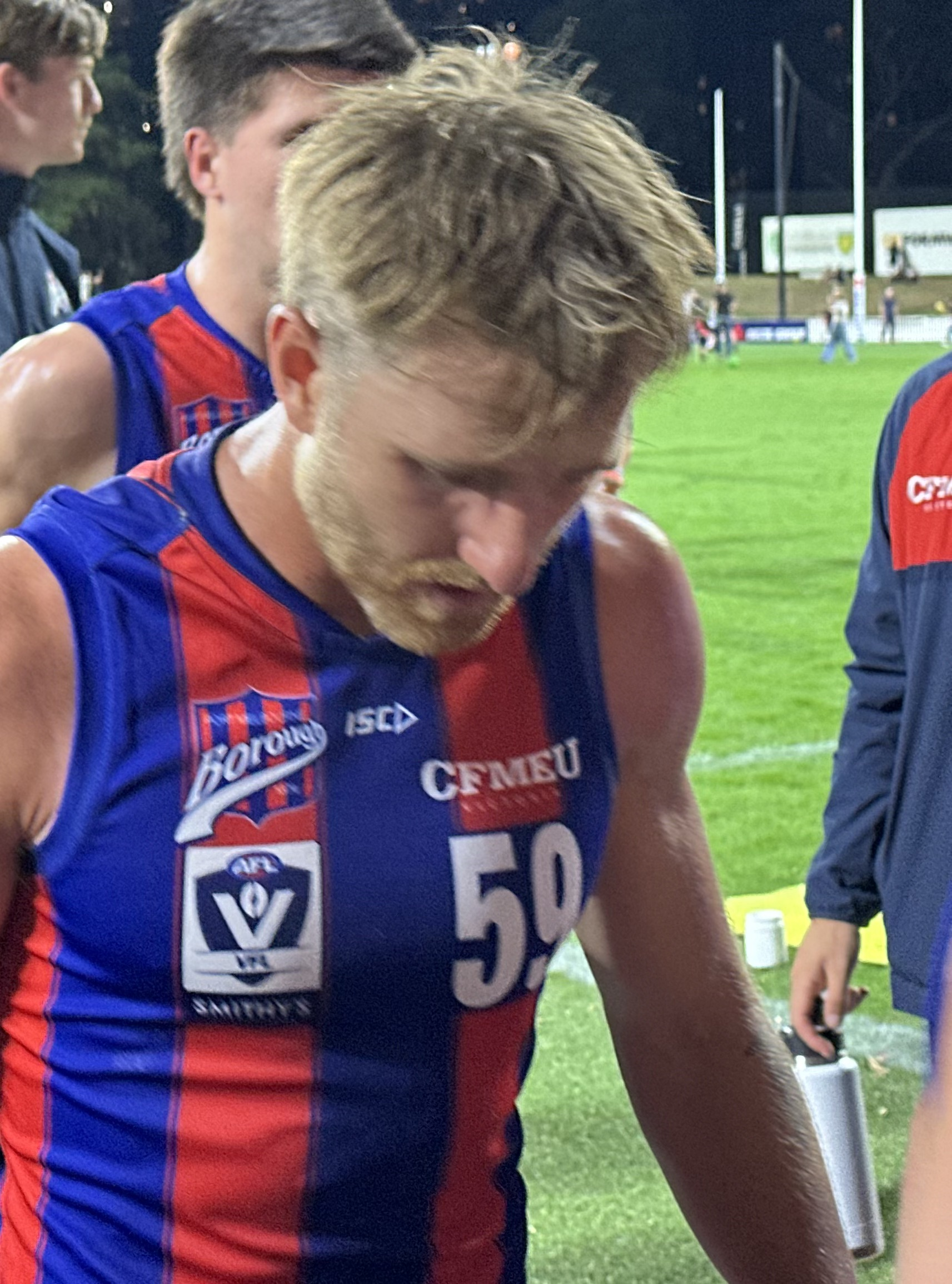
Heppell with Port Melbourne in 2025

Heppell, along with 33 other Essendon players, whilst not returning a positive test was found guilty of using a banned performance-enhancing substance, thymosin beta-4, as part of Essendon's sports supplements program during the 2012 season. He and his teammates were initially found not guilty in March 2015 by the AFL Anti-Doping Tribunal, but a guilty verdict was returned in January 2016 after an appeal by the World Anti-Doping Agency. He was suspended for two years which, with backdating, ended in November 2016; as a result, he served approximately fourteen months of his suspension and missed the entire 2016 AFL season.

In February 2017, Heppell was announced as Essendon's new captain, taking over from Brendon Goddard. In December 2019, he signed a two-year contract extension with Essendon, keeping him at the club until 2022. He re-signed for 2023 but stepped down as captain after six seasons in the role.

On 13 August 2024, Heppell announced that he would retire at the conclusion of the 2024 AFL season. Heppell played a farewell game in the Bombers' final game of the season, against the Brisbane Lions at The Gabba.

== Statistics ==
Legend
G	Goals	K	Kicks	D	Disposals	T	Tackles
B	Behinds	H	Handballs	M	Marks

Season	Team	No.	Games	Totals							Averages (per game)							Votes
Season	Team	No.	Games	G	B	K	H	D	M	T	G	B	K	H	D	M	T	Votes
2011	Essendon	21	23	3	4	262	231	493	132	63	0.1	0.2	11.4	10.0	21.4	5.7	2.7	4
2012	Essendon	21	20	3	3	250	180	430	113	59	0.2	0.2	12.5	9.0	21.5	5.7	3.0	3
2013	Essendon	21	19	8	11	269	192	461	88	74	0.4	0.6	14.2	10.1	24.3	4.6	3.9	10
2014	Essendon	21	22	6	6	332	294	626	116	99	0.3	0.3	15.1	13.4	28.5	5.3	4.5	14
2015	Essendon	21	22	13	8	304	262	566	87	105	0.6	0.4	13.8	11.9	25.7	4.0	4.8	10
2016	Essendon	21	0	—	—	—	—	—	—	—	—	—	—	—	—	—	—	0
2017	Essendon	21	23	12	8	314	292	606	118	96	0.5	0.3	13.7	12.7	26.3	5.1	4.2	14
2018	Essendon	21	22	10	4	327	263	590	122	87	0.5	0.2	14.9	12.0	26.8	5.5	4.0	13
2019	Essendon	21	18	4	5	230	243	473	98	52	0.2	0.3	12.8	13.5	26.3	5.4	2.9	3
2020 (Note: The 2020 season was played with 17 home-and-away matches per team (down from 22) and 16-minute quarters with time on (down from 20-minute quarters with time on) due to the impact of the COVID-19 pandemic.)	Essendon	21	3	1	1	15	25	40	4	3	0.3	0.3	5.0	8.3	13.3	1.3	1.0	0
2021	Essendon	21	19	2	1	276	194	470	132	47	0.1	0.1	14.5	10.2	24.7	6.9	2.5	0
2022	Essendon	21	22	4	2	259	224	483	145	41	0.2	0.1	11.8	10.2	22.0	6.6	1.9	0
2023	Essendon	21	22	1	0	253	190	443	156	50	0.0	0.0	11.5	8.6	20.1	7.1	2.3	0
2024	Essendon	21	18	1	0	195	188	383	102	29	0.1	0.0	10.8	10.4	21.3	5.7	1.6	0
Career			253	68	53	3286	2778	6064	1413	805	0.3	0.2	13.0	11.0	24.0	5.6	3.2	71

== Honours and achievements ==
Representative

- Australia representative honours in international rules football: 2015

Individual

- Essendon captain: 2017–2022
- All-Australian team: 2014
- Crichton Medal 2014
- Ron Evans Medal: 2011
- AFLPA best first-year player: 2011
- AFLCA best young player of the year: 2012

== Personal life ==
In January 2025, Heppell married his long-time partner, Kate. The couple hyphenated their surname to Turner-Heppell to acknowledge Kate's maiden name.

In November and December 2025, Dyson competed on the twelfth season of I'm a Celebrity...Get Me Out of Here!, which began airing on January 18, 2026. He was eliminated on February 11, 2026 after 15 days in the jungle.
