= Michael Hurley (Australian footballer) =

Australian rules footballer (born 1990)

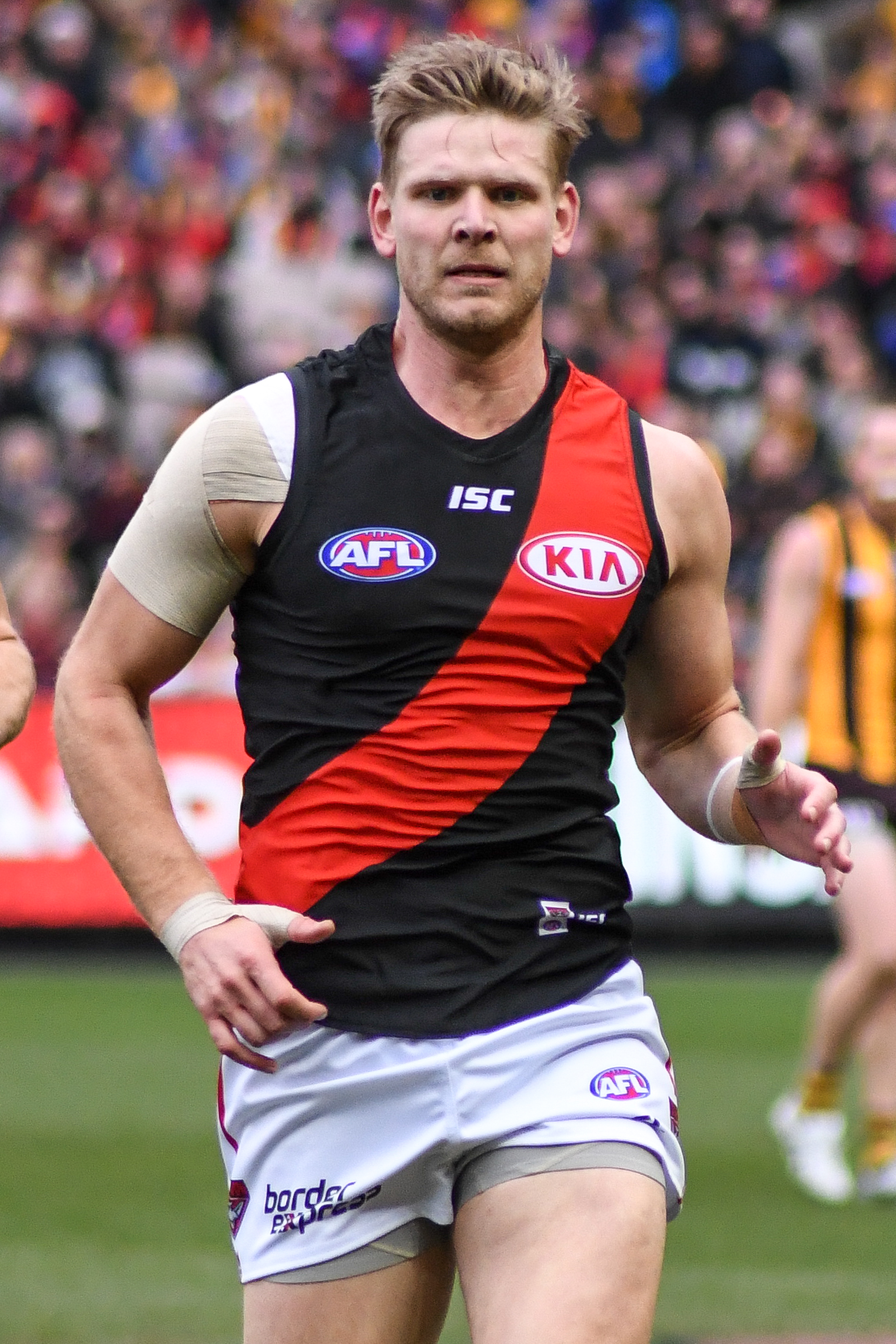
- Hurley playing for Essendon in August 2018

Personal information
- Full name: Michael Hurley
- Nicknames: Hurls, Polarbear
- Born: 1 June 1990 (age 36)
- Original team: Northern Knights (TAC Cup)
- Draft: No. 5, 2008 national draft
- Height: 193 cm (6 ft 4 in)
- Weight: 94 kg (207 lb)
- Position: Defender

Club information
- Current club: Essendon
- Number: 18

Playing career^{1}
Years	Club	Games (Goals)
2009–2022	Essendon	194 (109)
- ^{1} Playing statistics correct to the end of 2022.

Career highlights
- 2× All-Australian team: 2015, 2017; 22under22 team: 2012; 2× AFL Rising Star nominee: 2009, 2010

Michael Hurley (born 1 June 1990) is a former professional Australian rules footballer who played for the Essendon Football Club in the Australian Football League (AFL).

He attended Viewbank College and was recruited by the Essendon Football Club with the fifth overall selection in the 2008 national draft.

== AFL career ==
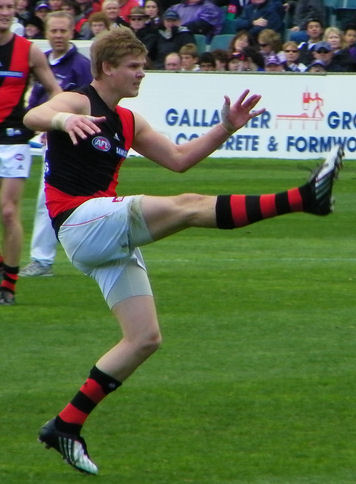
Hurley in debut season.

Hurley showed tremendous form throughout the TAC Cup, showing his all-round quality for the Northern Knights. He was named All-Australian in 2007 and backed it up with another selection after the 2008 AFL Under 18 Championships and was also selected in the TAC Cup Team of the Year in both seasons.

He made his debut against the Port Adelaide Power in round 1, 2009, and was nominated twice as the AFL Rising Star nominee, in round 20 of that season, and round 18 the following year, both times against St Kilda. After his match-winning four goal performance against Hawthorn in round 22, 2009, Leigh Matthews said, "Very few young talls have the physical maturity to match it with their older and stronger opponents, which is why the brilliant early form of young Bomber Michael Hurley is quite amazing."

Ahead of the 2010 season, Hurley inherited the famous number 18 guernsey from retired club great Matthew Lloyd.

The following four seasons saw Hurley's form fluctuate due to injury and the constant shuffling of his position in the team between both ends of the ground. He averaged 22 goals per season, and spent just as much time playing in the back line on some of the opposition's best key forwards, where his precise kicking and attacking flair out of the back half were noticeable on numerous occasions.

The 2014 season brought with it a permanent role for Hurley as a key defender, the position for which he was initially drafted. This newfound positional consistency allowed him to really begin to shine as a footballer. He played a career-high 21 games during the season and averaged 19 disposals, six marks and three rebound 50s for the year. Despite Essendon's poor performances in the 2015 season, Michael averaged 21 disposals, seven marks and six rebound 50s over 19 matches. He was awarded with his first All-Australian selection, and finished runner-up in the W.S. Crichton Medal.

Hurley, along with 33 other Essendon players, was found guilty of using a banned performance-enhancing substance, thymosin beta-4, as part of Essendon's sports supplements program during the 2012 season. He and his teammates were initially found not guilty in March 2015 by the AFL Anti-Doping Tribunal, but a guilty verdict was returned in January 2016 after an appeal by the World Anti-Doping Agency. He was suspended for two years which, with backdating, ended in November 2016; as a result, he served approximately fourteen months of his suspension and missed the entire 2016 AFL season. During his suspension, he signed a five-year contract extension to stay with Essendon until the end of 2022.

In 2017, he was named in the All-Australian Team.

Prior to the 2021 AFL season, Hurley contracted an infection in his hip. The infection became life-threatening, leaving him bedridden for a month, during which he lost 10kg, and afterwards, had to learn to walk again. He went through multiple stints in hospital, and underwent a hip replacement, missing the entire 2021 season. He was eventually able to return to the VFL late in the season, playing 5 games, before announcing his retirement ahead of Round 23, 2022, playing a farewell game against Richmond and kicking a goal.

== Personal life ==
On 25 September 2009, Hurley was arrested after a drunken altercation with a taxi driver, after the driver demanded payment for the fare when Hurley asked him to stop at a fast food drivethrough. Hurley was later charged with multiple counts of assault; it is alleged that he punched the driver and kicked him in the groin.

Hurley is an ambassador for the MAD Foundation, an Australian health charity supporting young people with disability.

== Statistics ==
Statistics are correct to the end of 2021

Legend
G	Goals	K	Kicks	D	Disposals	T	Tackles
B	Behinds	H	Handballs	M	Marks

Season	Team	No.	Games	Totals							Averages (per game)						
Season	Team	No.	Games	G	B	K	H	D	M	T	G	B	K	H	D	M	T
2009	Essendon	22	10	10	5	83	61	144	62	15	1.0	0.5	8.3	6.1	14.4	6.2	1.5
2010	Essendon	18	19	12	7	176	132	308	98	17	0.6	0.4	9.3	7.0	16.2	5.2	0.9
2011	Essendon	18	18	27	22	161	99	260	94	24	1.5	1.2	8.9	5.5	14.4	5.2	1.3
2012	Essendon	18	16	26	21	132	87	219	84	13	1.6	1.3	8.2	5.4	13.7	5.2	0.8
2013	Essendon	18	16	24	16	129	74	203	81	7	1.5	1.0	8.1	4.6	12.7	5.1	0.4
2014	Essendon	18	21	4	1	258	152	410	128	26	0.2	0.0	12.3	7.2	19.5	6.1	1.2
2015	Essendon	18	19	2	4	301	104	405	131	20	0.1	0.1	15.8	5.5	21.3	6.9	1.1
2016	Essendon	18	0 (Note: Missed 2016 AFL season due to suspension)	—	—	—	—	—	—	—	—	—	—	—	—	—	—
2017	Essendon	18	21	3	1	355	161	537	161	22	0.1	0.0	16.9	8.7	25.6	7.7	1.0
2018	Essendon	18	20	0	0	293	141	434	156	15	0.0	0.0	14.7	7.1	21.7	7.8	0.8
2019	Essendon	18	19	0	0	272	96	368	151	9	0.0	0.0	14.3	5.1	19.4	7.9	0.5
2020	Essendon	18	14	0	0	154	66	220	86	5	0.0	0.0	11.0	4.7	15.7	6.1	0.3
2021	Essendon	18	0	—	—	—	—	—	—	—	—	—	—	—	—	—	—
2022	Essendon	18	1	1	0	5	1	6	2	0	1.0	0.0	5.0	1.0	6.0	2.0	0.0
Career			194	109	77	2319	1195	3514	1234	173	0.6	0.4	12.0	6.2	18.2	6.4	0.9
