= 2011 Essendon Football Club season =

Essendon Football Club
2011 season
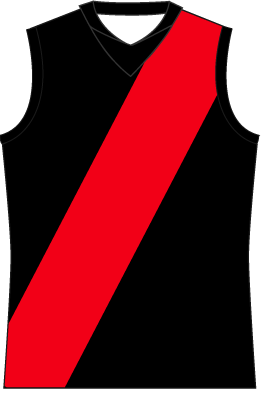
- Essendon's 2011 guernsey
- President: David Evans
- Coach: James Hird (1st season)
- Captains: Jobe Watson (2nd season)
- Home ground: Marvel Stadium
- Pre-season competition: Runners Up
- AFL season: 8th
- Finals series: Elimination Final
- Best and Fairest: David Zaharakis
- Leading goalkicker: Stewart Crameri (34)
- Highest home attendance: 89,626 vs. Collingwood (Round 5)
- Lowest home attendance: 33,631 vs. West Coast (Round 7)
- Average home attendance: 49,267
- Club membership: 50,275 (▲9,686 / +23.86%)

The 2011 Essendon Football Club season is the club's 113th season in the Australian Football League (AFL).

Essendon won 11 matches, drew one and lost 10 matches in the 2011 season. Essendon won five matches within the first eight rounds, before a form slump culminated in a five-match losing streak and Essendon dropping out of the top eight for the first time this season when it lost to Hawthorn by 65 points.

Their season begun with a 55-point thumping of triple-preliminary finalists the Western Bulldogs before a narrow five-point defeat to Sydney followed. Wins over St Kilda (in their captain Nick Riewoldt's 200th game) followed, before a thrilling draw against Carlton and a five-goal loss in the Anzac Day match against Collingwood followed.

Round 6 brought along the mother of all Essendon wins – a 139-point thumping of the Gold Coast at home, with the Bombers recording a record first-quarter score of 15.4 (94) and its quarter-time lead of 93 points also brought along a new record. Amidst this, Essendon lost the second quarter in surprising circumstances, before going on to finish the job to record its first win over a side featuring Gary Ablett since 2005. Only two more wins would follow, against the West Coast Eagles and Brisbane Lions in the weeks after the Suns annihilation.

Essendon pulled off the boilover of the season when they defeated the previously unbeaten Geelong by four points in Round 15, 2011, without their injured skipper, Jobe Watson. It was their first win over the Cats in almost six years, having not beaten them since Round 18, 2005. However, it was just their second win over Geelong since 2003, leaving them with one of the worst records against Geelong in recent times.

Round 20 saw Essendon at home to Sydney for the first time since Round 1, 2006 when Essendon triumphed by 27 points. Essendon won by one point after a post-siren shot by Sydney's Adam Goodes drifted to the left. Round 23 saw Essendon qualifying the finals for the second time in two years, when it defeated Port Adelaide by 7 points at Etihad Stadium. It ended a seven-year winless run against the side, having not beaten them since Round 18, 2004.

Essendon's elimination final against Carlton was lost by 62 points, ending what was otherwise a promising first year for James Hird in the Essendon coaching role.

== Squad ==
Essendon Football Club
Senior list		Rookie List	Coaching staff
2 Ricky Dyson; 3 Scott Gumbleton; 4 Jobe Watson (c); 5 Brent Stanton; 6 Angus Monfries; 7 Leroy Jetta; 8 Jason Winderlich; 9 Brent Prismall; 10 Mark McVeigh; 11 David Zaharakis; 12 Andrew Welsh (vc); 13 Anthony Long; 14 Sam Lonergan; 15 Courtenay Dempsey; 16 Tayte Pears; 17 Jake Melksham; 18 Michael Hurley; 19 David Hille (vet); 20 Henry Slattery; 21 Dyson Heppell	22 Jake Carlisle; 23 David Myers; 24 Alex Browne; 25 Ariel Steinberg; 26 Cale Hooker; 27 Luke Davis; 28 Darcy Daniher; 29 Alwyn Davey; 30 Paddy Ryder; 31 Dustin Fletcher (vet); 32 Travis Colyer; 33 Mark Williams; 34 Kyle Hardingham; 37 Kyle Reimers; 38 Michael Ross; 39 Heath Hocking; 40 Ben Howlett; 42 Nathan Lovett-Murray; 43 Michael Hibberd; 44 Tom Bellchambers	1 Jay Neagle; 35 Taite Silverlock; 36 Tyson Slattery; 41 Michael Quinn; 45 Stewart Crameri; 46 Josh Jenkins; 47 James Webster	Head coach: James Hird; Assistant coaches: Mark Thompson; Brendan McCartney; Sean Wellman; Simon Goodwin; Dean Wallis; Shannon Grant (Bendigo); Legend: (c) Captain(s); (vc) Vice-captain(s); Long-term injury list; Upgraded rookie(s); (vet) Veterans list; Updated: 15 February 2012; Source(s): Playing list

=== Trades ===
In

Player	Traded From	Traded To	Traded For
None

Out

Player	Traded From	Traded To	Traded For
None

=== Drafts ===
National Draft

Round	Pick	Name	From	League
1	8	(Victoria (state)) Dyson Heppell	Gippsland Power	TAC Cup
2	31	(Victoria (state)) Ariel Steinberg	Bendigo Pioneers	TAC Cup
3	48	(Victoria (state)) Alex Browne	Oakleigh Chargers	TAC Cup
4	64	(South Australia) Luke Davis	West Adelaide Football Club	SANFL
5	80	(Victoria (state)) Michael Ross	Gippsland Power	TAC Cup
6	95	Pass		
7	106	(Western Australia) Ben Howlett	Rookie Promotion	

Rookie Draft

Round	Pick	Name	From	League
1	12	(Victoria (state)) Josh Jenkins	Lake Boga	CMFL
2	29	(Victoria (state)) Jay Neagle	Essendon	AFL
3	46	(South Australia) Tyson Slattery	Essendon	AFL
4	61	(New South Wales) James Webster^	Woy Woy	BDFL

^ Denotes NSW AFL scholarship elevation

Pre-Season Draft

Round	Pick	Name	From	League
1	4	(Victoria (state)) Michael Hibberd	Frankston	VFL

== Results ==
=== Pre-season (NAB Cup) ===
==== Round 1 ====
	Round 1
Friday, 18 February 7:30 pm	Essendon 1.11.1 (76)	def.	Brisbane Lions 0.2.2 (14)	Etihad Stadium (crowd: 23,313)	Report
Friday, 18 February 9:25 pm	St Kilda 0.6.2 (38)	drew with	Essendon 0.5.8 (38)	Etihad Stadium (crowd: 24,158)	Report
Essendon progressed to the second round.

==== Quarter-finals ====
	Round 2
Thursday, 24 February 7:10 pm	Melbourne 1.11.7 (82)	def. by	Essendon 1.17.20 (121)	Etihad Stadium (crowd: 13,863)	Report
Essendon progressed to the third round.

==== Semi-finals ====
	Semi-finals
Friday, 4 March 7:40 pm	Essendon 0.12.12 (84)	def.	St Kilda 0.6.9 (45)	Etihad Stadium (crowd: 17,632)	Report

==== Grand Final ====
2011 NAB Cup Grand Final
Friday, 11 March 7:45 pm	Essendon	def. by	Collingwood	Etihad Stadium (crowd: 45,304)	Report
0.2.2 (14); 0.3.4 (22); 0.9.5 (59); 0.13.8 (86)	Q1; Q2; Q3; Final	0.3.4 (22); 0.7.6 (48); 1.11.7 (82); 1.15.9 (108)	Umpires: Rosebury, Stevic, Nicholls, Jennings; Michael Tuck Medal: Heath Shaw; Television broadcast: Seven Network
Super Goals	1 Buckley
Hurley, Monfries 3 Ryder, Watson, Zaharakis 2 Hocking 1	Goals	3 Krakouer, Dawes; 2 Cloke; 1 Ball, Beams, McCarthy, Pendlebury, Swan, Thomas, Wellingham
Hardingham (groin)	Injuries	Nil
This was the first pre-season Grand Final Essendon has had since winning the title in 2000.

=== Home and Away season ===
==== Round 1 ====
Round 1
Sunday, 27 March 1:10 pm	Essendon	def.	Western Bulldogs	Etihad Stadium (crowd: 42,617)	Report
3.4 (22); 9.12 (66); 13.15 (93); 16.17 (113)	Q1; Q2; Q3; Final	4.1 (25); 5.2 (32); 7.5 (47); 8.10 (58)	Umpires: Farmer, Kennedy, Findlay; Television broadcast: Fox Sports
Ryder, Watson, Monfries, Hurley, Stanton, Zaharakis 2 Crameri, Winderlich, McVeigh, Myers 1	Goals	2 Hall, Giansiracusa; 1 Djerrkura, Wood, Grant, Hill
Watson, Hille, Hocking, Stanton, Jetta, Melksham, Ryder, Heppell	Best	Murphy, Higgins, Ward, Picken, Markovic, Hudson
Nil	Injuries	Wood (ankle)
This was James Hird's first game as coach of Essendon

Brownlow Votes
3 David Hille (Essendon); 2 Jobe Watson (Essendon); 1 Paddy Ryder (Essendon)

==== Round 2 ====
Round 2
Sunday, 3 April 2:10 pm	Sydney	def.	Essendon	ANZ Stadium (crowd: 28,082)	Report
1.5 (11); 6.8 (44); 10.11 (71); 14.14 (98)	Q1; Q2; Q3; Final	4.4 (28); 8.7 (55); 12.9 (81); 13.15 (93)	Umpires: Rosebury, Pannel, Jennings; Television broadcast: Channel 7
McGlynn, Bolton 3 White, Bevan 2 Goodes, Kennedy, Rohan, O’Keefe 1	Goals	2 Ryder, Crameri, Winderlich, Hurley; 1 Jetta, Davey, Hocking, McVeigh
Goodes, Bevan, Bolton, McGlynn, O’Keefe, Grundy, Hannebery	Best	Watson, Stanton, Hurley, Heppell, Bellchambers, Ryder, Davey
Nil	Injuries	Hille (hip) replaced by Davey

Brownlow Votes
3 Ben McGlynn (Sydney); 2 Jude Bolton (Sydney); 1 Jobe Watson (Essendon)

==== Round 3 ====
Round 3
Sunday, 10 April 4:40 pm	St Kilda	def. by	Essendon	Etihad Stadium (crowd: 47,762)	Report
5.3 (33); 7.5 (45); 8.9 (57); 12.12 (84)	Q1; Q2; Q3; Final	8.2 (50); 13.2 (80); 19.5 (119); 21.10 (136)	Umpires: Donlon, McBurney, Armstrong; Television broadcast: Channel 7
Riewoldt 3 Milne, Steven 2 Dal Santo, Fisher, Gram, Montagna, Stanley 1	Goals	3 Hurley, Watson, Winderlich, Zaharakis; 2 Howlett, Monfries, Ryder; 1 Crameri, Jetta, Bellchambers
Gram, Dal Santo, Armitage, Fisher, Ray	Best	Watson, Hocking, Bellchambers, Ryder, Crameri, Hurley, Fletcher
Essendon defeated St Kilda for the fourth time in succession. Nick Riewoldt played his 200th AFL game for the Saints in that match.

Brownlow Votes
3 Jobe Watson (Essendon); 2 Heath Hocking (Essendon); 1 Jason Gram (St Kilda)

==== Round 4 ====
Round 4
Saturday, 16 April 2:10 pm	Carlton	drew with	Essendon	MCG (crowd: 78,605)	Report
0.2 (2); 4.9 (33); 6.13 (49); 11.13 (79)	Q1; Q2; Q3; Final	3.2 (20); 6.3 (39); 7.8 (50); 11.13 (79)	Umpires: Nicholls, Stewart, McBurney; Television broadcast: Channel 10 and One HD
Simpson 3 Waite, Garlett, Laidler, Curnow, Carrazzo, Murphy, Warnock, Yarran 1	Goals	2 Jetta, Lonergan; 1 Hurley, Bellchambers, Watson, Fletcher, Zaharakis, Stanton, Melksham
Murphy, Waite, Gibbs, Yarran, Robinson, Jaminson, Judd, Scotland	Best	Fletcher, Hooker, Zaharakis, Watson, Hardingham, Stanton
Nil	Injuries	Winderlich (knee), Dempsey (knee)
The draw between Carlton and Essendon was the third of the season, and the third between the two sides since 1993. It also means that four of the last 12 games played at the MCG were drawn, and it is the first time since 1914 that there were three draws in the first four rounds of the season.

Brownlow Votes
3 Dustin Fletcher (Essendon); 2 Nick Duigan (Carlton); 1 Marc Murphy (Carlton)

==== Round 5 ====
Round 5
Monday, 25 April 2:40 pm	Essendon	def. by	Collingwood	MCG (crowd: 89,626)	Report
0.3 (3); 3.8 (26); 7.10 (52); 11.11 (77)	Q1; Q2; Q3; Final	4.2 (26); 7.3 (45); 10.6 (66); 16.11 (107)	Umpires: Chamberlain, Ryan, Findlay; Television broadcast: Channel 10 and One HD
Crameri 4 Hille, Zaharakis 2 Bellchambers, Watson, Jetta 1	Goals	3 Cloke, Pendlebury; 2 Beams, Dawes; 1 Swan, Jolly, Didak, Ball, Brown, Sidebottom
Crameri, Heppell, Fletcher, Jetta, Bellchambers	Best	Pendlebury, Cloke, Davis, Shaw, Ball

Brownlow Votes
3 Scott Pendlebury (Collingwood); 2 Stewart Crameri (Essendon); 1 Travis Cloke (Collingwood)

Anzac Medal
Scott Pendlebury

==== Round 6 ====
Round 6
Sunday, 1 May 1:10 pm	Essendon	def.	Gold Coast	Etihad Stadium (crowd: 33,710)	Report
15.4 (94); 18.4 (112); 25.8 (158); 31.11 (197)	Q1; Q2; Q3; Final	0.1 (1); 5.3 (33); 7.5 (47); 8.10 (58)	Umpires: Ritchie, Ryan, Nicholls; Television broadcast: Fox Sports
Reimers 8 Monfries, Crameri 4 Ryder 3 Bellchambers, Lonergan, Zaharakis 2 Hille, Hocking, Howlett, Jetta, Stanton, Watson 1	Goals	2 Iles, Matera; 1 McKenzie, Rischitelli, Shaw, Smith
Reimers, Howlett, Watson, Lonergan, Ryder, Stanton, Zaharakis	Best	Ablett, Brennan, Swallow, Iles, Harbrow
Essendon's first quarter score of 15.4 (94) was the highest first quarter score of all time.; Essendon's first quarter score of 15.4 (94) was the highest scoring of any quarter since 1919.; Essendon's final score of 31.11 (197) was its highest since 2000, and its final winning margin of 139 points was its highest since 1989.; Set Essendon's new largest winning margin at Docklands Stadium

Brownlow Votes
3 Kyle Reimers (Essendon); 2 Jobe Watson (Essendon); 1 Ben Howlett (Essendon)

== Ladder ==
2011 AFL ladder
Pos	Team	Pld	W	L	D	PF	PA	PP	Pts	
1	Collingwood	22	20	2	0	2592	1546	167.7	80	Finals series
2	Geelong (P)	22	19	3	0	2548	1619	157.4	76	Finals series
3	Hawthorn	22	18	4	0	2355	1634	144.1	72	Finals series
4	West Coast	22	17	5	0	2235	1715	130.3	68	Finals series
5	Carlton	22	14	7	1	2225	1700	130.9	58	Finals series
6	St Kilda	22	12	9	1	1891	1677	112.8	50	Finals series
7	Sydney	22	12	9	1	1897	1735	109.3	50	Finals series
8	Essendon	22	11	10	1	2217	2217	100.0	46	Finals series
9	North Melbourne	22	10	12	0	2106	2082	101.2	40	
10	Western Bulldogs	22	9	13	0	2060	2155	95.6	36	
11	Fremantle	22	9	13	0	1791	2155	83.1	36	
12	Richmond	22	8	13	1	2069	2396	86.4	34	
13	Melbourne	22	8	13	1	1974	2315	85.3	34	
14	Adelaide	22	7	15	0	1742	2193	79.4	28	
15	Brisbane Lions	22	4	18	0	1814	2240	81.0	16	
16	Port Adelaide	22	3	19	0	1718	2663	64.5	12	
17	Gold Coast	22	3	19	0	1534	2726	56.3	12	

Source: AFL ladder
Rules for classification: 1) points; 2) percentage; 3) number of points for.
(P) Premiers

=== Ladder progression ===
Round	1	2	3	4	5	6	7	8	9	10	11	12	13	14	15	16	17	18	19	20	21	22	23	24
Ground	H	A	A	A	H	H	H	A	A	B	H	A	H	A	H	H	A	H	H	H	A	A	H	B
Result	W	L	W	D	L	W	W	W	L		L	L	L	L	W	W	W	L	L	W	W	L	W	
Position	1	6	6	6	6	5	4	3	4	5	7	8	8	10	8	8	7	9	9	8	7	8	8	8

Source: Competitive Matches
A = Away; H = Home; B = Bye; W = Win; D = Draw; L = Lose

== Tribunal cases ==
Player	Round	Charge category	Level	Verdict	Points^{[a]}	Result	Victim	Club	Ref(s)
Mark Williams	NAB Cup	Striking	2	Guilty	70	Reprimand	Liam Jurrah	Melbourne	
Cale Hooker	3	Wrestling		Guilty	0	$900	Nick Riewoldt	St Kilda	
Nathan Lovett-Murray	7	Negligent Umpire Contact		Guilty	0	$900	Mathew Leppard		

== Season Statistics ==
=== Home attendance ===
Round	Opponent	Attendance
1	Western Bulldogs	42,617
5	Collingwood	89,626
6	Gold Coast	33,710
7	West Coast	33,631
11	Melbourne	53,077
13	North Melbourne	42,329
15	Geelong	43,806
16	Richmond	55,442
18	Carlton	74,123
20	Sydney	38,722
23	Port Adelaide	34,849
Total Attendance		541,932
Average Attendance		49,267

== Season Financials ==
Annual Report 2011

Item	$ (AUD)
Revenue	$51,416,731
Membership & Reserved Seating	$10,363,690
Gate Receipts	$963,101
Marketing Revenue	$15,532,108
Merchandise Revenue	$2,563,026
Football Department Spend	$18,510,078
Operating Profit/Loss	$1,024,086
Total Profit/Loss	$2,059,379

== Notes ==
- ^{a} "Points" refers to carry-over points accrued following the sanction. For example, 154.69 points draw a one-match suspension, with 54.69 carry-over points (for every 100 points, a one-match suspension is given).
