= 2010 AFL season =

114th season of the Australian Football League (AFL)

2010 AFL premiership season
- Teams: 16
- Premiers: Collingwood; 15th premiership
- Minor premiers: Collingwood; 18th minor premiership
- Pre-season cup: Western Bulldogs; 1st pre-season cup win
- Brownlow Medallist: Chris Judd (Carlton); 30 votes
- Coleman Medallist: Jack Riewoldt (Richmond); 78 goals

Attendance
- Matches played: 186
- Total attendance: 7,146,738 (38,423 per match)
- Highest: 100,016 (Grand Final, Collingwood vs. St Kilda)

The 2010 AFL season was the 114th season of the Australian Football League (AFL), the highest level senior Australian rules football competition in Australia, which was known as the Victorian Football League until 1989. The season featured sixteen clubs, ran from 25 March until 2 October, and comprised a 22-game home-and-away season followed by a finals series featuring the top eight clubs.

The premiership was won by the Collingwood Football Club for the 15th time, after it defeated St Kilda by 56 points in the 2010 AFL Grand Final Replay.

== Pre-season ==
=== NAB Cup ===
==== Results ====
Round One
West Coast	117
Essendon	82
Adelaide	67
Port Adelaide	123
Hawthorn	135
Richmond	62
Western Bulldogs	53
Brisbane Lions	45
St Kilda	100
Collingwood	99
Sydney	71
Carlton	59
Geelong	81
North Melbourne	95
Fremantle	97
Melbourne	50

Quarterfinals
West Coast	70
Port Adelaide	158
Hawthorn	54
Western Bulldogs	111
St Kilda	79
Sydney	78
North Melbourne	90
Fremantle	94

Semifinals
Port Adelaide	89
Western Bulldogs	92
St Kilda	115
Fremantle	45

Final
Western Bulldogs	104
St Kilda	64

== Premiership season ==
The draw for the 2010 AFL premiership season was produced by the AFL with the intention of producing a balanced draw while also providing the fans and television networks with blockbuster games. In a competition with 16 teams and 22 rounds, it is not possible for all teams to play each other twice. These factors combine to create some of the following anomalies:

- Six teams played each other for the first time in round 21;
- Of the Victorian-based teams St Kilda played six games interstate while Essendon travelled only three times;
- Of the six games Fremantle played in Melbourne, none were at the MCG, while defending premiers Geelong played seven games at the MCG despite not being one of the tenants at this ground;
- North Melbourne and Port Adelaide played only two of 2009's top eight teams twice, while Essendon and Collingwood played five of these teams twice.

=== Round 1 ===
	Round 1 (season launch)
Thursday, 25 March (7:10 pm)	Richmond 9.10 (64)	def. by	Carlton 18.12 (120)	MCG (crowd: 72,010)	Report
Friday, 26 March (7:40 pm)	Geelong 19.11 (125)	def.	Essendon 13.16 (94)	MCG (crowd: 57,772)	Report
Saturday, 27 March (2:10 pm)	Melbourne 8.13 (61)	def. by	Hawthorn 17.15 (117)	MCG (crowd: 45,615)	Report
Saturday, 27 March (7:10 pm)	Sydney 13.10 (88)	def. by	St Kilda 15.6 (96)	ANZ Stadium (crowd: 31,330)	Report
Saturday, 27 March (7:10 pm)	Brisbane Lions 16.18 (114)	def.	West Coast 12.10 (82)	Gabba (crowd: 29,201)	Report
Sunday, 28 March (12:40 pm)	Port Adelaide 13.18 (96)	def.	North Melbourne 12.10 (82)	AAMI Stadium (crowd: 21,205)	Report
Sunday, 28 March (5:10 pm)	Fremantle 17.16 (118)	def.	Adelaide 9.8 (62)	Subiaco Oval (crowd: 30,976)	Report
Sunday, 28 March (2:10 pm)	Western Bulldogs 13.15 (93)	def. by	Collingwood 19.15 (129)	Etihad Stadium (crowd: 49,000)	Report
Geelong started their title defence against Essendon. This was a departure from the previous three seasons, when the two teams that had contested the grand final played each other in round 1.; Brad Johnson played his 350th match for the Western Bulldogs in their match against Collingwood.; Mature age Fremantle rookie Michael Barlow had 33 possessions on debut against Adelaide, the highest number for a debutant since Dean Greig's record of 39 in 1991.

=== Round 2 ===
	Round 2 (Easter)
Thursday, 1 April (7:40 pm)	Brisbane Lions 16.11 (107)	def.	Carlton 12.16 (88)	Gabba (crowd: 36,780)	Report
Saturday, 3 April (2:10 pm)	Collingwood 12.14 (86)	def.	Melbourne 12.13 (85)	MCG (crowd: 50,421)	Report
Saturday, 3 April (7:10 pm)	St Kilda 23.5 (143)	def.	North Melbourne 6.3 (39)	Etihad Stadium (crowd: 32,006)	Report
Saturday, 3 April (5:40 pm)	West Coast 12.14 (86)	def. by	Port Adelaide 13.11 (89)	Subiaco Oval (crowd: 37,010)	Report
Sunday, 4 April (12:40 pm)	Adelaide 11.9 (75)	def. by	Sydney 18.10 (118)	AAMI Stadium (crowd: 36,041)	Report
Sunday, 4 April (2:10 pm)	Essendon 9.15 (69)	def. by	Fremantle 17.11 (113)	Etihad Stadium (crowd: 29,651)	Report
Sunday, 4 April (4:40 pm)	Richmond 7.6 (48)	def. by	Western Bulldogs 17.18 (120)	MCG (crowd: 27,358)	Report
Monday, 5 April (2:10 pm)	Hawthorn 13.13 (91)	def. by	Geelong 14.16 (100)	MCG (crowd: 68,628)	Report
Fremantle won its first match in Victoria since round 4, 2007, breaking a streak of sixteen consecutive losses in the state.; This was the first of the regular Easter Monday public holiday clashes between Geelong and Hawthorn.

=== Round 3 ===
	Round 3
Friday, 9 April (7:40 pm)	St Kilda 10.9 (69)	def.	Collingwood 4.17 (41)	Etihad Stadium (crowd: 49,669)	Report
Saturday, 10 April (2:10 pm)	North Melbourne 17.14 (116)	def.	West Coast 13.13 (91)	Etihad Stadium (crowd: 18,394)	Report
Saturday, 10 April (2:40 pm)	Port Adelaide 11.15 (81)	def. by	Brisbane Lions 16.12 (108)	AAMI Stadium (crowd: 23,306)	Report
Saturday, 10 April (7:10 pm)	Sydney 16.15 (111)	def.	Richmond 7.14 (56)	SCG (crowd: 28,414)	Report
Saturday, 10 April (7:10 pm)	Carlton 10.15 (75)	def. by	Essendon 13.17 (95)	MCG (crowd: 71,006)	Report
Sunday, 11 April (1:10 pm)	Melbourne 7.15 (57)	def.	Adelaide 5.11 (41)	MCG (crowd: 23,335)	Report
Sunday, 11 April (2:10 pm)	Western Bulldogs 14.16 (100)	def.	Hawthorn 12.12 (84)	Etihad Stadium (crowd: 35,933)	Report
Sunday, 11 April (2:40 pm)	Fremantle 18.17 (125)	def.	Geelong 17.16 (118)	Subiaco Oval (crowd: 38,762)	Report
For the first time since 1989, West Coast lost its first three games of the year.; Richmond won the final quarter of its game against Sydney, ending a streak of nineteen consecutive quarters lost, dating back to round 21, 2009. This was the longest streak of quarters lost since St Kilda lost twenty-two in a row in 1897.

=== Round 4 ===
	Round 4
Friday, 16 April (6:40 pm)	West Coast 15.11 (101)	def.	Essendon 11.12 (78)	Subiaco Oval (crowd: 38,676)	Report
Saturday, 17 April (2:10 pm)	North Melbourne 8.12 (60)	def. by	Sydney 14.16 (100)	Etihad Stadium (crowd: 23,646)	Report
Saturday, 17 April (2:40 pm)	Adelaide 6.19 (55)	def. by	Carlton 16.7 (103)	AAMI Stadium (crowd: 38,321)	Report
Saturday, 17 April (7:10 pm)	Brisbane Lions 13.23 (101)	def.	Western Bulldogs 12.7 (79)	Gabba (crowd: 33,323)	Report
Saturday, 17 April (7:10 pm)	Collingwood 17.21 (123)	def.	Hawthorn 8.11 (59)	MCG (crowd: 67,668)	Report
Sunday, 18 April (1:10 pm)	Richmond 11.12 (78)	def. by	Melbourne 20.13 (133)	MCG (crowd: 42,594)	Report
Sunday, 18 April (2:10 pm)	Geelong 23.21 (159)	def.	Port Adelaide 10.4 (64)	Skilled Stadium (crowd: 25,579)	Report
Sunday, 18 April (4:40 pm)	St Kilda 16.12 (108)	def.	Fremantle 14.9 (93)	Etihad Stadium (crowd: 29,814)	Report

=== Round 5 ===
	Round 5 (Anzac Day)
Friday, 23 April (7:40 pm)	Western Bulldogs 18.13 (121)	def.	Adelaide 10.12 (72)	Etihad Stadium (crowd: 26,884)	Report
Saturday, 24 April (2:10 pm)	Sydney 17.13 (115)	def.	West Coast 9.9 (63)	SCG (crowd: 28,422)	Report
Saturday, 24 April (7:10 pm)	Melbourne 15.13 (103)	def.	Brisbane Lions 7.11 (53)	MCG (crowd: 36,396)	Report
Saturday, 24 April (7:10 pm)	Port Adelaide 7.12 (54)	def.	St Kilda 6.8 (44)	AAMI Stadium (crowd: 23,355)	Report
Sunday, 25 April (2:40 pm)	Collingwood 18.12 (120)	def.	Essendon 8.7 (55)	MCG (crowd: 90,070)	Report
Sunday, 25 April (5:40 pm)	Hawthorn 10.10 (70)	def. by	North Melbourne 12.10 (82)	Aurora Stadium (crowd: 16,301)	Report
Sunday, 25 April (6:40 pm)	Fremantle 15.22 (112)	def.	Richmond 11.7 (73)	Subiaco Oval (crowd: 38,010)	Report
Monday, 26 April (2:10 pm)	Carlton 15.14 (104)	def.	Geelong 9.14 (68)	MCG (crowd: 71,399)	Report

=== Round 6 ===
	Round 6
Friday, 30 April (7:40 pm)	Western Bulldogs 6.10 (46)	def. by	St Kilda 7.7 (49)	Etihad Stadium (crowd: 43,072)	Report
Saturday, 1 May (2:10 pm)	North Melbourne 15.14 (104)	def.	Melbourne 12.6 (78)	Etihad Stadium (crowd: 26,763)	Report
Saturday, 1 May (2:40 pm)	Adelaide 10.14 (74)	def. by	Port Adelaide 14.13 (97)	AAMI Stadium (crowd: 40,371)	Report
Saturday, 1 May (7:10 pm)	Sydney 16.11 (107)	def.	Brisbane Lions 13.9 (87)	SCG (crowd: 30,975)	Report
Saturday, 1 May (7:10 pm)	Essendon 15.16 (106)	def.	Hawthorn 9.9 (63)	MCG (crowd: 61,006)	Report
Sunday, 2 May (1:10 pm)	Geelong 24.17 (161)	def.	Richmond 7.11 (53)	Skilled Stadium (crowd: 24,106)	Report
Sunday, 2 May (2:10 pm)	Carlton 16.6 (102)	def. by	Collingwood 24.11 (155)	MCG (crowd: 80,645)	Report
Sunday, 2 May (2:40 pm)	West Coast 10.13 (73)	def. by	Fremantle 17.9 (111)	Subiaco Oval (crowd: 40,886)	Report
The combined total of 95 points scored in the match between St Kilda and Western Bulldogs was the lowest aggregate score ever in a game at Etihad Stadium.

=== Round 7 ===
	Round 7
Friday, 7 May (7:40 pm)	Melbourne 9.12 (66)	def. by	Western Bulldogs 10.10 (70)	MCG (crowd: 45,444)	Report
Saturday, 8 May (2:10 pm)	Essendon 16.10 (106)	def. by	Port Adelaide 17.7 (109)	Etihad Stadium (crowd: 29,248)	Report
Saturday, 8 May (1:10 pm)	West Coast 15.12 (102)	def.	Hawthorn 14.10 (94)	Subiaco Oval (crowd: 35,864)	Report
Saturday, 8 May (7:10 pm)	Brisbane Lions 15.10 (100)	def. by	Fremantle 15.23 (113)	Gabba (crowd: 27,739)	Report
Saturday, 8 May (7:10 pm)	Collingwood 23.19 (157)	def.	North Melbourne 14.7 (91)	MCG (crowd: 52,696)	Report
Sunday, 9 May (1:10 pm)	Geelong 19.12 (126)	def.	Sydney 9.5 (59)	Skilled Stadium (crowd: 25,970)	Report
Sunday, 9 May (4:10 pm)	Adelaide 15.14 (104)	def.	Richmond 7.12 (54)	AAMI Stadium (crowd: 31,196)	Report
Monday, 10 May (7:20 pm)	St Kilda 9.14 (68)	def. by	Carlton 20.9 (129)	Etihad Stadium (crowd: 42,866)	Report
Richmond's seven consecutive losses and percentage of 49.5% was statistically the worst start to a season by any team since 1955.

=== Round 8 ===
	Round 8
Friday, 14 May (6:40 pm)	Fremantle 15.7 (97)	def. by	Collingwood 20.13 (133)	Subiaco Oval (crowd: 41,624)	Report
Saturday, 15 May (2:10 pm)	Western Bulldogs 14.17 (101)	def.	Sydney 9.9 (63)	Manuka Oval (crowd: 14,308)	Report
Saturday, 15 May (2:10 pm)	Melbourne 6.10 (46)	def. by	West Coast 10.15 (75)	MCG (crowd: 28,592)	Report
Saturday, 15 May (7:10 pm)	North Melbourne 12.12 (84)	def.	Adelaide 11.9 (75)	Etihad Stadium (crowd: 16,455)	Report
Saturday, 15 May (7:10 pm)	Brisbane Lions 10.14 (74)	def. by	Geelong 24.11 (155)	Gabba (crowd: 33,629)	Report
Sunday, 16 May (1:10 pm)	Richmond 13.8 (86)	def. by	Hawthorn 13.11 (89)	MCG (crowd: 41,563)	Report
Sunday, 16 May (2:40 pm)	Port Adelaide 14.8 (92)	def. by	Carlton 17.16 (118)	AAMI Stadium (crowd: 30,228)	Report
Sunday, 16 May (4:40 pm)	St Kilda 11.15 (81)	def. by	Essendon 14.9 (93)	Etihad Stadium (crowd: 39,204)	Report
Hawthorn's win over Richmond was a significant one. It later emerged that Hawthorn coach Alastair Clarkson would have been sacked had they lost.

=== Round 9 ===
	Round 9
Friday, 21 May (7:40 pm)	Collingwood 6.14 (50)	def. by	Geelong 12.14 (86)	MCG (crowd: 88,115)	Report
Saturday, 22 May (2:10 pm)	North Melbourne 7.15 (57)	def. by	Western Bulldogs 20.7 (127)	Etihad Stadium (crowd: 30,794)	Report
Saturday, 22 May (2:10 pm)	Sydney 9.9 (63)	def. by	Fremantle 14.16 (100)	SCG (crowd: 24,819)	Report
Saturday, 22 May (7:30 pm)	Essendon 19.16 (130)	def.	Richmond 14.11 (95)	MCG (crowd: 64,709)	Report
Saturday, 22 May (7:10 pm)	Melbourne 17.9 (111)	def.	Port Adelaide 16.14 (110)	TIO Stadium (crowd: 8,848)	Report
Sunday, 23 May (12:40 pm)	Adelaide 13.15 (93)	def.	Brisbane Lions 11.15 (81)	AAMI Stadium (crowd: 31,517)	Report
Sunday, 23 May (2:10 pm)	Carlton 8.12 (60)	def. by	Hawthorn 16.14 (110)	Etihad Stadium (crowd: 47,484)	Report
Sunday, 23 May (2:40 pm)	West Coast 8.8 (56)	def. by	St Kilda 13.13 (91)	Subiaco Oval (crowd: 36,244)	Report

=== Round 10 ===
	Round 10
Friday, 28 May (7:40 pm)	Essendon 15.9 (99)	def.	Western Bulldogs 14.6 (90)	Etihad Stadium (crowd: 45,742)	Report
Saturday, 29 May (2:10 pm)	Geelong 18.13 (121)	def.	Melbourne 10.7 (67)	Skilled Stadium (crowd: 24,525)	Report
Saturday, 29 May (2:40 pm)	Port Adelaide 3.12 (30)	def. by	Richmond 10.17 (77)	AAMI Stadium (crowd: 16,694)	Report
Saturday, 29 May (7:10 pm)	Brisbane Lions 13.10 (88)	def.	Collingwood 11.14 (80)	Gabba (crowd: 34,239)	Report
Saturday, 29 May (7:10 pm)	St Kilda 19.9 (123)	def.	Adelaide 12.4 (76)	Etihad Stadium (crowd: 28,708)	Report
Sunday, 30 May (1:10 pm)	Hawthorn 10.19 (79)	def.	Sydney 11.11 (77)	MCG (crowd: 36,003)	Report
Sunday, 30 May (2:10 pm)	Carlton 15.15 (105)	def.	West Coast 11.10 (76)	Etihad Stadium (crowd: 29,175)	Report
Sunday, 30 May (2:40 pm)	Fremantle 21.13 (139)	def.	North Melbourne 11.12 (78)	Subiaco Oval (crowd: 36,175)	Report
Richmond broke a 14-game losing streak with a 47-point victory over Port Adelaide in horrendous weather. In the game, Richmond laid a record 142 tackles, and Port Adelaide's score of 3.12 (30) set a new record as its lowest ever in the AFL.

=== Round 11 ===
	Round 11
Friday, 4 June (7:40 pm)	Richmond 8.11 (59)	def. by	St Kilda 14.13 (97)	Etihad Stadium (crowd: 32,858)	Report
Saturday, 5 June (2:10 pm)	Carlton 15.11 (101)	def.	Melbourne 9.6 (60)	MCG (crowd: 49,745)	Report
Saturday, 5 June (2:40 pm)	Adelaide 16.9 (105)	def.	Fremantle 12.10 (82)	AAMI Stadium (crowd: 35,605)	Report
Saturday, 5 June (7:10 pm)	North Melbourne 12.18 (90)	def.	Brisbane Lions 13.11 (89)	Etihad Stadium (crowd: 19,100)	Report
Saturday, 5 June (5:40 pm)	West Coast 14.14 (98)	def. by	Geelong 18.14 (122)	Subiaco Oval (crowd: 33,784)	Report
Sunday, 6 June (1:10 pm)	Sydney 12.17 (89)	def.	Essendon 12.8 (80)	SCG (crowd: 29,329)	Report
Sunday, 6 June (2:10 pm)	Hawthorn 10.14 (74)	def.	Port Adelaide 8.15 (63)	MCG (crowd: 21,287)	Report
Sunday, 6 June (4:40 pm)	Collingwood 17.11 (113)	def.	Western Bulldogs 16.7 (103)	Etihad Stadium (crowd: 40,813)	Report
Tyson Edwards (Adelaide) played his 321st and last AFL match, announcing his retirement after the match.

=== Round 12 ===
	Round 12 (Queen's Birthday)
Friday, 11 June (7:40 pm)	North Melbourne 14.13 (97)	def.	Carlton 10.8 (68)	Etihad Stadium (crowd: 43,732)	Report
Saturday, 12 June (2:10 pm)	Hawthorn 19.10 (124)	def.	Adelaide 11.11 (77)	Aurora Stadium (crowd: 16,167)	Report
Saturday, 12 June (7:10 pm)	Essendon 12.11 (83)	def. by	Geelong 23.16 (154)	Etihad Stadium (crowd: 46,358)	Report
Saturday, 12 June (7:10 pm)	Port Adelaide 8.7 (55)	def. by	Sydney 14.9 (93)	AAMI Stadium (crowd: 20,106)	Report
Sunday, 13 June (1:10 pm)	Richmond 19.12 (126)	def.	West Coast 11.11 (77)	MCG (crowd: 30,870)	Report
Sunday, 13 June (2:10 pm)	Western Bulldogs 17.19 (121)	def.	Brisbane Lions 8.8 (56)	Etihad Stadium (crowd: 30,831)	Report
Sunday, 13 June (2:40 pm)	Fremantle 10.7 (67)	def. by	St Kilda 12.13 (85)	Subiaco Oval (crowd: 37,569)	Report
Monday, 14 June (2:10 pm)	Melbourne 11.10 (76)	drew with	Collingwood 9.22 (76)	MCG (crowd: 67,454)	Report
North Melbourne played Carlton in a game which celebrated 25 years since North Melbourne pioneered 'Friday Night Football'.

=== Round 13 ===
	Round 13 (Week one)
Friday, 18 June (7:40 pm)	Hawthorn 14.18 (102)	def.	Essendon 13.8 (86)	MCG (crowd: 54,148)	Report
Saturday, 19 June (7:10 pm)	Carlton 12.15 (87)	def. by	Fremantle 14.12 (96)	Etihad Stadium (crowd: 28,869)	Report
Saturday, 19 June (7:10 pm)	Brisbane Lions 12.14 (86)	def. by	Richmond 15.15 (105)	Gabba (crowd: 28,415)	Report
Sunday, 20 June (1:10 pm)	North Melbourne 19.15 (129)	def.	Port Adelaide 14.9 (93)	Etihad Stadium (crowd: 15,109)	Report
Sunday, 20 June (2:40 pm)	West Coast 9.5 (59)	def. by	Western Bulldogs 17.17 (119)	Subiaco Oval (crowd: 34,280)	Report

	Round 13 (Week two)
Friday, 25 June (7:40 pm)	St Kilda 10.10 (70)	def.	Geelong 6.10 (46)	MCG (crowd: 58,208)	Report
Saturday, 26 June (7:10 pm)	Sydney 10.11 (71)	def. by	Collingwood 13.18 (96)	ANZ Stadium (crowd: 43,585)	Report
Sunday, 27 June (2:40 pm)	Adelaide 16.21 (117)	def.	Melbourne 11.7 (73)	AAMI Stadium (crowd: 34,442)	Report
Round 13 was a split round, played over two weeks to give each club one week's break at roughly midseason.; In its first rematch since the 2009 AFL Grand Final, St Kilda and Geelong set a new record crowd for a home and away game between the two clubs (58,208).; Geelong was held goalless in the second half against St Kilda, the first time since 2001 that the club had been goalless in a half of football.; The game between Geelong and St Kilda was notable for the spiteful clashes between Geelong forward Steve Johnson and St Kilda tagger Steven Baker; Johnson was twice cited for striking Baker, and was suspended for three weeks, while Baker was cited three times for striking Johnson and once for misconduct (deliberately punching Johnson in his broken hand), and was suspended for nine weeks.

=== Round 14 ===
	Round 14
Thursday, 1 July (7:10 pm)	Carlton 18.12 (120)	def.	Brisbane Lions 9.11 (65)	Etihad Stadium (crowd: 35,623)	Report
Friday, 2 July (7:40 pm)	Hawthorn 12.7 (79)	def.	Western Bulldogs 11.10 (76)	MCG (crowd: 47,454)	Report
Saturday, 3 July (1:10 pm)	Fremantle 17.13 (115)	def.	Port Adelaide 8.10 (58)	Subiaco Oval (crowd: 32,442)	Report
Saturday, 3 July (7:10 pm)	Collingwood 20.15 (135)	def.	West Coast 7.10 (52)	Etihad Stadium (crowd: 38,781)	Report
Saturday, 3 July (7:10 pm)	Adelaide 19.10 (124)	def.	Essendon 5.10 (40)	AAMI Stadium (crowd: 37,296)	Report
Sunday, 4 July (1:10 pm)	Geelong 14.14 (98)	def.	North Melbourne 9.9 (63)	Skilled Stadium (crowd: 25,159)	Report
Sunday, 4 July (2:10 pm)	Richmond 14.5 (89)	def.	Sydney 12.13 (85)	MCG (crowd: 39,386)	Report
Sunday, 4 July (4:40 pm)	St Kilda 15.10 (100)	def.	Melbourne 9.11 (65)	Etihad Stadium (crowd: 31,993)	Report

=== Round 15 ===
	Round 15
Friday, 9 July (8:10 pm)	Port Adelaide 12.7 (79)	def. by	Collingwood 16.9 (105)	AAMI Stadium (crowd: 24,260)	Report
Saturday, 10 July (2:10 pm)	Geelong 12.13 (85)	def.	Hawthorn 11.17 (83)	MCG (crowd: 69,220)	Report
Saturday, 10 July (1:10 pm)	West Coast 14.11 (95)	def. by	Adelaide 17.15 (117)	Subiaco Oval (crowd: 26,976)	Report
Saturday, 10 July (7:10 pm)	Richmond 15.10 (100)	def.	Fremantle 11.15 (81)	Etihad Stadium (crowd: 25,707)	Report
Saturday, 10 July (7:10 pm)	Brisbane Lions 10.5 (65)	def. by	St Kilda 11.13 (79)	Gabba (crowd: 29,329)	Report
Sunday, 11 July (1:10 pm)	Sydney 12.13 (85)	def.	North Melbourne 7.13 (55)	SCG (crowd: 23,856)	Report
Sunday, 11 July (2:10 pm)	Melbourne 19.8 (122)	def.	Essendon 14.19 (103)	MCG (crowd: 49,203)	Report
Sunday, 11 July (4:40 pm)	Carlton 8.10 (58)	def. by	Western Bulldogs 20.6 (126)	Etihad Stadium (crowd: 37,517)	Report
This was Mark Williams' last game as Port Adelaide's coach.

=== Round 16 ===
	Round 16
Friday, 16 July (8:10 pm)	Adelaide 11.8 (74)	def.	Geelong 9.9 (63)	AAMI Stadium (crowd: 41,195)	Report
Saturday, 17 July (2:10 pm)	Collingwood 15.10 (100)	def.	St Kilda 6.16 (52)	MCG (crowd: 81,386)	Report
Saturday, 17 July (2:10 pm)	Hawthorn 17.16 (118)	def.	Brisbane Lions 7.1 (43)	Aurora Stadium (crowd: 16,690)	Report
Saturday, 17 July (7:10 pm)	Essendon 14.16 (100)	def. by	West Coast 20.12 (132)	Etihad Stadium (crowd: 26,991)	Report
Saturday, 17 July (7:10 pm)	Western Bulldogs 12.11 (83)	def.	Port Adelaide 7.5 (47)	TIO Stadium (crowd: 10,108)	Report
Sunday, 18 July (1:10 pm)	Carlton 10.8 (68)	def. by	Sydney 16.11 (107)	Etihad Stadium (crowd: 31,915)	Report
Sunday, 18 July (2:10 pm)	Richmond 7.11 (53)	def. by	North Melbourne 15.13 (103)	MCG (crowd: 42,723)	Report
Sunday, 18 July (2:40 pm)	Fremantle 11.16 (82)	def.	Melbourne 10.11 (71)	Subiaco Oval (crowd: 32,816)	Report
Mark LeCras (West Coast) kicked a personal best and ground record of 12.2 (74) in his club's win over Essendon at Etihad Stadium. The haul of 12 goals was the highest kicked by a player in a game since Scott Cummings, who kicked 14 goals in round 4, 2000.

=== Round 17 ===
	Round 17
Friday, 23 July (7:40 pm)	St Kilda 14.3 (87)	drew with	Hawthorn 13.9 (87)	Etihad Stadium (crowd: 49,373)	Report
Saturday, 24 July (2:10 pm)	Collingwood 19.13 (127)	def.	Richmond 6.9 (45)	MCG (crowd: 66,727)	Report
Saturday, 24 July (2:10 pm)	Geelong 19.13 (127)	def.	Brisbane Lions 9.10 (64)	Skilled Stadium (crowd: 24,508)	Report
Saturday, 24 July (7:10 pm)	North Melbourne 18.11 (119)	def. by	Essendon 18.14 (122)	Etihad Stadium (crowd: 30,330)	Report
Saturday, 24 July (5:40 pm)	West Coast 11.17 (83)	def. by	Carlton 15.19 (109)	Subiaco Oval (crowd: 35,925)	Report
Sunday, 25 July (1:10 pm)	Western Bulldogs 24.14 (158)	def.	Fremantle 12.4 (76)	Etihad Stadium (crowd: 26,797)	Report
Sunday, 25 July (2:10 pm)	Melbourne 22.10 (142)	def.	Sydney 10.9 (69)	MCG (crowd: 29,374)	Report
Sunday, 25 July (4:10 pm)	Port Adelaide 13.10 (88)	def.	Adelaide 9.15 (69)	AAMI Stadium (crowd: 36,788)	Report

=== Round 18 ===
	Round 18
Friday, 30 July (7:40 pm)	Essendon 16.12 (108)	def.	St Kilda 11.9 (75)	Etihad Stadium (crowd: 37,165)	Report
Saturday, 31 July (2:10 pm)	Collingwood 15.15 (105)	def.	Carlton 9.3 (57)	MCG (crowd: 76,980)	Report
Saturday, 31 July (2:40 pm)	Port Adelaide 13.14 (92)	def.	Hawthorn 12.12 (84)	AAMI Stadium (crowd: 22,340)	Report
Saturday, 31 July (7:10 pm)	Sydney 9.18 (72)	def. by	Geelong 20.5 (125)	ANZ Stadium (crowd: 30,710)	Report
Saturday, 31 July (7:10 pm)	Brisbane Lions 9.10 (64)	def. by	Melbourne 11.8 (74)	Gabba (crowd: 26,144)	Report
Sunday, 1 August (1:10 pm)	Richmond 15.10 (100)	def.	Adelaide 11.14 (80)	MCG (crowd: 19,181)	Report
Sunday, 1 August (2:10 pm)	Western Bulldogs 22.11 (143)	def.	North Melbourne 10.12 (72)	Etihad Stadium (crowd: 28,038)	Report
Sunday, 1 August (2:40 pm)	Fremantle 24.16 (160)	def.	West Coast 13.7 (85)	Subiaco Oval (crowd: 40,451)	Report

=== Round 19 ===
	Round 19
Friday, 6 August (7:40 pm)	Essendon 9.19 (73)	def. by	Carlton 23.11 (149)	MCG (crowd: 57,095)	Report
Saturday, 7 August (2:10 pm)	North Melbourne 19.9 (123)	def.	Fremantle 10.9 (69)	Etihad Stadium (crowd: 14,891)	Report
Saturday, 7 August (2:10 pm)	Sydney 19.15 (129)	def.	Hawthorn 13.7 (85)	SCG (crowd: 29,431)	Report
Saturday, 7 August (7:10 pm)	Geelong 12.13 (85)	def. by	Collingwood 14.23 (107)	MCG (crowd: 84,401)	Report
Saturday, 7 August (5:40 pm)	West Coast 9.11 (65)	def. by	Brisbane Lions 10.10 (70)	Subiaco Oval (crowd: 32,587)	Report
Sunday, 8 August (1:10 pm)	St Kilda 23.13 (151)	def.	Port Adelaide 8.9 (57)	Etihad Stadium (crowd: 22,467)	Report
Sunday, 8 August (2:10 pm)	Melbourne 16.13 (109)	def.	Richmond 11.14 (80)	MCG (crowd: 45,844)	Report
Sunday, 8 August (4:10 pm)	Adelaide 7.11 (53)	def. by	Western Bulldogs 8.13 (61)	AAMI Stadium (crowd: 29,321)	Report
Geelong lost its first home-and-away game as the home team at any venue since round 21, 2007, ending a run of 30 consecutive wins.

=== Round 20 ===
	Round 20
Friday, 13 August (7:40 pm)	Essendon 10.4 (64)	def. by	Collingwood 24.18 (162)	MCG (crowd: 59,277)	Report
Saturday, 14 August (2:10 pm)	Carlton 23.18 (156)	def.	Richmond 10.7 (67)	MCG (crowd: 44,716)	Report
Saturday, 14 August (1:10 pm)	Fremantle 13.9 (87)	def. by	Sydney 14.12 (96)	Subiaco Oval (crowd: 34,087)	Report
Saturday, 14 August (7:10 pm)	Western Bulldogs 9.6 (60)	def. by	Geelong 25.11 (161)	Etihad Stadium (crowd: 42,199)	Report
Saturday, 14 August (7:10 pm)	Port Adelaide 8.13 (61)	def.	West Coast 8.12 (60)	AAMI Stadium (crowd: 14,113)	Report
Sunday, 15 August (1:10 pm)	Brisbane Lions 13.19 (97)	def. by	Adelaide 15.14 (104)	Gabba (crowd: 25,403)	Report
Sunday, 15 August (2:10 pm)	Hawthorn 15.9 (99)	def.	Melbourne 12.6 (78)	MCG (crowd: 48,211)	Report
Sunday, 15 August (4:40 pm)	North Melbourne 9.9 (63)	def. by	St Kilda 17.13 (115)	Etihad Stadium (crowd: 23,118)	Report
The crowd of 14,113 for the Port Adelaide vs. West Coast game was the lowest ever crowd for an AFL game at AAMI Stadium.

=== Round 21 ===
	Round 21
Friday, 20 August (7:40 pm)	Geelong 18.13 (121)	def.	Carlton 12.7 (79)	Etihad Stadium (crowd: 45,172)	Report
Saturday, 21 August (2:10 pm)	St Kilda 17.13 (115)	def.	Richmond 14.10 (94)	Etihad Stadium (crowd: 33,790)	Report
Saturday, 21 August (2:10 pm)	Hawthorn 24.11 (155)	def.	Fremantle 5.9 (39)	Aurora Stadium (crowd: 15,532)	Report
Saturday, 21 August (7:10 pm)	Collingwood 6.18 (54)	def.	Adelaide 7.9 (51)	MCG (crowd: 42,159)	Report
Saturday, 21 August (7:10 pm)	Sydney 17.12 (114)	def.	Western Bulldogs 10.10 (70)	SCG (crowd: 36,554)	Report
Sunday, 22 August (12:40 pm)	Port Adelaide 17.10 (112)	def.	Melbourne 11.17 (83)	AAMI Stadium (crowd: 21,086)	Report
Sunday, 22 August (2:10 pm)	Essendon 10.8 (68)	def. by	Brisbane Lions 14.11 (95)	Etihad Stadium (crowd: 28,785)	Report
Sunday, 22 August (2:40 pm)	West Coast 14.10 (94)	def. by	North Melbourne 16.14 (110)	Subiaco Oval (crowd: 32,007)	Report
Fremantle played at Aurora Stadium for the first time since the siren controversy of 2006. Fremantle, having already qualified for a place in the finals, chose to rest seven of its regular senior players for the game, playing inexperienced youngsters in their place; as a result, the team suffered the worst loss of any team during 2010, going down by 116 points. By winning, Hawthorn clinched its own finals berth. Hawthorn's score and winning margin were each the highest ever for an AFL game played at Aurora Stadium, until the highest score was eclipsed in round 10, 2012, when Hawthorn scored 27.12 (174) against North Melbourne.; Collingwood's three-point win over Adelaide secured its first minor premiership since 1977, and its first McClelland Trophy since 1970.; West Coast's loss meant that the club won its first wooden spoon in its 24-year history.

=== Round 22 ===
	Round 22
Friday, 27 August (6:40 pm)	Fremantle 13.15 (93)	def.	Carlton 13.9 (87)	Subiaco Oval (crowd: 39,376)	Report
Saturday, 28 August (1:10 pm)	Geelong 16.16 (112)	def.	West Coast 10.8 (68)	Skilled Stadium (crowd: 24,099)	Report
Saturday, 28 August (2:10 pm)	Hawthorn 15.8 (98)	def.	Collingwood 13.17 (95)	MCG (crowd: 76,218)	Report
Saturday, 28 August (3:40 pm)	Adelaide 9.11 (65)	def.	St Kilda 5.7 (37)	AAMI Stadium (crowd: 38,121)	Report
Saturday, 28 August (7:10 pm)	Western Bulldogs 17.5 (107)	def.	Essendon 11.12 (78)	Etihad Stadium (crowd: 26,776)	Report
Saturday, 28 August (7:10 pm)	Brisbane Lions 10.8 (68)	def. by	Sydney 16.10 (106)	Gabba (crowd: 24,789)	Report
Sunday, 29 August (2:10 pm)	Richmond 16.16 (112)	def. by	Port Adelaide 18.14 (122)	Etihad Stadium (crowd: 37,674)	Report
Sunday, 29 August (4:40 pm)	Melbourne 15.13 (103)	def. by	North Melbourne 17.11 (113)	MCG (crowd: 31,064)	Report
In a first for the league, the final round of the season was given a floating schedule, with the AFL to allocate the timeslots for the games six weeks out from the end of the season, in order to reduce the likelihood of a team playing the first week of the finals after a Sunday game in round 22. The schedule was announced on 12 July 2010. The floating schedule for the final round became a standard feature in future years.; Collingwood lost its first match since round 10, ending an 11-match unbeaten streak.

== Win/loss table ==
Team	1	2	3	4	5	6	7	8	9	10	11	12	13	14	15	16	17	18	19	20	21	22	F1	F2	F3	GF1	GF2	Ladder
Adelaide	Frem −56	**Syd** **−43**	Melb −16	**Carl** **−48**	WB −49	**PA** **−23**	**Rich** **+50**	NM −9	**BL** **+12**	StK −47	**Frem** **+23**	Haw −47	**Melb** **+44**	**Ess** **+84**	WCE +22	**Geel** **+11**	PA −19	Rich −20	**WB** **−8**	BL +7	Coll −3	**StK** **+28**	X	X	X	X	X	11
Brisbane Lions	**WCE** **+32**	**Carl** **+19**	PA +27	**WB** **+22**	Melb −50	Syd −20	**Frem** **−13**	**Geel** **−81**	Adel −12	**Coll** **+8**	NM −1	WB −65	**Rich** **−19**	Carl −55	**StK** **−14**	Haw −75	Geel −63	**Melb** **−10**	WCE +5	**Adel** **−7**	Ess +27	**Syd** **−38**	X	X	X	X	X	13
Carlton	Rich +56	BL −19	**Ess** **−20**	Adel +48	**Geel** **+36**	**Coll** **−53**	StK +61	PA +26	**Haw** **−50**	**WCE** **+29**	**Melb** **+41**	NM −29	**Frem** **−9**	**BL** **+55**	**WB** **−68**	**Syd** **−39**	WCE +26	Coll −48	Ess +76	**Rich** **+89**	Geel −42	Frem −6	Syd −5	X	X	X	X	**8**
Collingwood	WB +36	**Melb** **+1**	StK −28	**Haw** **+64**	**Ess** **+65**	Carl +53	**NM** **+66**	Frem +36	**Geel** **−36**	BL −8	**WB** **+10**	Melb; 0	Syd +25	**WCE** **+83**	PA +26	**StK** **+48**	**Rich** **+82**	**Carl** **+48**	Geel +22	Ess +98	**Adel** **+3**	Haw −3	**WB** **+62**	X	**Geel** **+41**	**StK**; **0**	**StK** **+56**	**1**
Essendon	Geel −31	**Frem** **−44**	Carl +20	WCE −23	Coll −65	**Haw** **+43**	**PA** **−3**	StK +12	**Rich** **+35**	**WB** **+9**	Syd −9	**Geel** **−71**	Haw −16	Adel −84	Melb −19	**WCE** **−32**	NM +3	**StK** **+33**	**Carl** **−76**	**Coll** **−98**	**BL** **−27**	WB −29	X	X	X	X	X	14
Fremantle	**Adel** **+56**	Ess +44	**Geel** **+7**	StK −15	**Rich** **+39**	WCE +38	BL +13	**Coll** **−36**	Syd +37	**NM** **+61**	Adel −23	**StK** **−18**	Carl +9	**PA** **+57**	Rich −19	**Melb** **+11**	WB −82	**WCE** **+75**	NM −54	**Syd** **−9**	Haw −116	**Carl** **+6**	**Haw** **+30**	Geel −69	X	X	X	**6**
Geelong	**Ess** **+31**	Haw +9	Frem −7	**PA** **+95**	Carl −36	**Rich** **+108**	**Syd** **+67**	BL +81	Coll +36	**Melb** **+54**	WCE +24	Ess +71	StK −24	**NM** **+35**	**Haw** **+2**	Adel −11	**BL** **+63**	Syd +53	**Coll** **−22**	WB +101	**Carl** **+42**	**WCE** **+44**	**StK** **−4**	**Frem** **+69**	Coll −41	X	X	**2**
Hawthorn	Melb +56	**Geel** **−9**	WB −16	Coll −64	**NM** **−12**	Ess −43	WCE −8	Rich +3	Carl +50	**Syd** **+2**	**PA** **+11**	**Adel** **+47**	**Ess** **+16**	**WB** **+3**	Geel −2	**BL** **+75**	StK; 0	PA −8	Syd −44	**Melb** **+21**	**Frem** **+116**	**Coll** **+3**	Frem −30	X	X	X	X	**7**
Melbourne	**Haw** **−56**	Coll −1	**Adel** **+16**	Rich +55	**BL** **+50**	NM −26	**WB** **−4**	**WCE** **−29**	**PA** **+1**	Geel −54	Carl −41	**Coll**; **0**	Adel −44	StK −35	**Ess** **+19**	Frem −11	**Syd** **+73**	BL +10	**Rich** **+29**	Haw −21	PA −29	**NM** **−10**	X	X	X	X	X	12
North Melbourne	PA −14	StK −104	**WCE** **+25**	**Syd** **−40**	Haw +12	**Melb** **+26**	Coll −66	**Adel** **+9**	**WB** **−70**	Frem −61	**BL** **+1**	**Carl** **+29**	**PA** **+36**	Geel −35	Syd −30	Rich +50	**Ess** **−3**	WB −71	**Frem** **+54**	**StK** **−52**	WCE +16	Melb +10	X	X	X	X	X	9
Port Adelaide	**NM** **+14**	WCE +3	**BL** **−27**	Geel −95	**StK** **+10**	Adel +23	Ess +3	**Carl** **−26**	Melb −1	**Rich** **−47**	Haw −11	**Syd** **−38**	NM −36	Frem −57	**Coll** **−26**	WB −36	**Adel** **+19**	**Haw** **+8**	StK −94	**WCE** **+1**	**Melb** **+29**	Rich +10	X	X	X	X	X	10
Richmond	**Carl** **−56**	**WB** **−72**	Syd −55	**Melb** **−55**	Frem −39	Geel −108	Adel −50	**Haw** **−3**	Ess −35	PA +47	**StK** **−38**	**WCE** **+49**	BL +19	**Syd** **+4**	**Frem** **+19**	**NM** **−50**	Coll −82	**Adel** **+20**	Melb −29	Carl −89	StK −24	**PA** **−10**	X	X	X	X	X	15
St Kilda	Syd +8	**NM** **+104**	**Coll** **+28**	**Frem** **+15**	PA −10	WB +3	**Carl** **−61**	**Ess** **−12**	WCE +35	**Adel** **+47**	Rich +38	Frem +18	**Geel** **+24**	**Melb** **+35**	BL +14	Coll −48	**Haw**; **0**	Ess −33	**PA** **+94**	NM +52	**Rich** **+24**	Adel −28	Geel +4	X	**WB** **+24**	Coll; 0	Coll −56	**3**
Sydney	**StK** **−8**	Adel +43	**Rich** **+55**	NM +40	**WCE** **+56**	**BL** **+20**	Geel −67	WB −38	**Frem** **−37**	Haw −2	**Ess** **+9**	PA +38	**Coll** **−25**	Rich −4	**NM** **+30**	Carl +39	Melb −73	**Geel** **−53**	**Haw** **+44**	Frem +9	**WB** **+44**	BL +38	**Carl** **+5**	WB −5	X	X	X	**5**
West Coast	BL −32	**PA** **−3**	NM −25	**Ess** **+23**	Syd −56	**Frem** **−38**	**Haw** **+8**	Melb +29	**StK** **−35**	Carl −29	**Geel** **−24**	Rich −49	**WB** **−60**	Coll −83	**Adel** **−22**	Ess +32	**Carl** **−26**	Frem −75	**BL** **−5**	PA −1	**NM** **−16**	Geel −44	X	X	X	X	X	16
Western Bulldogs	**Coll** **−36**	Rich +72	**Haw** **+16**	BL −22	**Adel** **+49**	**StK** **−3**	Melb +4	**Syd** **+38**	NM +70	Ess −9	Coll −10	**BL** **+65**	WCE +60	Haw −3	Carl +68	**PA** **+36**	**Frem** **+82**	**NM** **+71**	Adel +8	**Geel** **−101**	Syd −44	**Ess** **+29**	Coll −62	**Syd** **+5**	StK −24	X	X	**4**
Team	1	2	3	4	5	6	7	8	9	10	11	12	13	14	15	16	17	18	19	20	21	22	F1	F2	F3	GF1	GF2	Ladder

+	Win	Qualified for finals
−	Loss	Eliminated

Bold – Home game

== Ladder ==
2010 AFL ladder
Pos	Team	Pld	W	L	D	PF	PA	PP	Pts	
1	Collingwood (P)	22	17	4	1	2349	1658	141.7	70	Finals series
2	Geelong	22	17	5	0	2518	1702	147.9	68	Finals series
3	St Kilda	22	15	6	1	1935	1591	121.6	62	Finals series
4	Western Bulldogs	22	14	8	0	2174	1734	125.4	56	Finals series
5	Sydney	22	13	9	0	2017	1863	108.3	52	Finals series
6	Fremantle	22	13	9	0	2168	2087	103.9	52	Finals series
7	Hawthorn	22	12	9	1	2044	1847	110.7	50	Finals series
8	Carlton	22	11	11	0	2143	1983	108.1	44	Finals series
9	North Melbourne	22	11	11	0	1930	2208	87.4	44	
10	Port Adelaide	22	10	12	0	1749	2123	82.4	40	
11	Adelaide	22	9	13	0	1763	1870	94.3	36	
12	Melbourne	22	8	13	1	1863	1971	94.5	34	
13	Brisbane Lions	22	7	15	0	1775	2158	82.3	28	
14	Essendon	22	7	15	0	1930	2402	80.3	28	
15	Richmond	22	6	16	0	1714	2348	73.0	24	
16	West Coast	22	4	18	0	1773	2300	77.1	16	

Source: AFL ladder
Rules for classification: 1) points; 2) percentage; 3) number of points for.
(P) Premiers

=== Ladder progression ===
Numbers highlighted in green indicate that the team finished the round inside the top 8.
Numbers highlighted in blue indicates the team finished first on the ladder in that round.
Numbers highlighted in red indicates the team finished in last place on the ladder in that round.

Team ╲ Round	1	2	3	4	5	6	7	8	9	10	11	12	13	14	15	16	17	18	19	20	21	22
Collingwood	4	8	8	12	16	20	24	28	28	28	32	34	38	42	46	50	54	58	62	66	70	70
Geelong	4	8	8	12	12	16	20	24	28	32	36	40	40	44	48	48	52	56	56	60	64	68
St Kilda	4	8	12	16	16	20	20	20	24	28	32	36	40	44	48	48	50	50	54	58	62	62
Western Bulldogs	0	4	8	8	12	12	16	20	24	24	24	28	32	32	36	40	44	48	52	52	52	56
Sydney	0	4	8	12	16	20	20	20	20	20	24	28	28	28	32	36	36	36	40	44	48	52
Fremantle	4	8	12	12	16	20	24	24	28	32	32	32	36	40	40	44	44	48	48	48	48	52
Hawthorn	4	4	4	4	4	4	4	8	12	16	20	24	28	32	32	36	38	38	38	42	46	50
Carlton	4	4	4	8	12	12	16	20	20	24	28	28	28	32	32	36	36	36	40	44	44	44
North Melbourne	0	0	4	4	8	12	12	16	16	16	20	24	28	28	28	32	32	32	36	36	40	44
Port Adelaide	4	8	8	8	12	16	20	20	20	20	20	20	20	20	20	20	24	28	28	32	36	40
Adelaide	0	0	0	0	0	0	4	4	8	8	12	12	16	20	24	28	28	28	28	32	32	36
Melbourne	0	0	4	8	12	12	12	12	16	16	16	18	18	18	22	22	26	30	34	34	34	34
Brisbane Lions	4	8	12	16	16	16	16	16	16	20	20	20	20	20	20	20	20	20	24	24	28	28
Essendon	0	0	4	4	4	8	8	12	16	20	20	20	20	20	20	20	24	28	28	28	28	28
Richmond	0	0	0	0	0	0	0	0	0	4	4	8	12	16	20	20	20	24	24	24	24	24
West Coast	0	0	0	4	4	4	8	12	12	12	12	12	12	12	12	16	16	16	16	16	16	16

== Finals series ==
Qualifying and elimination finals
4 Sep, MCG
1	Collingwood	17.22 (124)
4	Western Bulldogs	8.14 (62)
5 Sep, ANZ Stadium
5	Sydney	14.15 (99)
8	Carlton	13.16 (94)
4 Sep, Subiaco Oval
6	Fremantle	14.10 (94)
7	Hawthorn	8.16 (64)
3 Sep, MCG
2	Geelong	11.13 (79)
3	St Kilda	12.11 (83)

Semi-finals
11 Sep, MCG
Western Bulldogs	11.11 (77)
Sydney	10.12 (72)
10 Sep, MCG
Geelong	20.15 (135)
Fremantle	10.6 (66)

Preliminary finals
17 Sep, MCG
Collingwood	18.12 (120)
Geelong	11.13 (79)
18 Sep, MCG
St Kilda	13.10 (88)
Western Bulldogs	8.16 (64)

Grand final and replay
25 Sep, MCG; Replay: 2 Oct MCG
Collingwood	9.14 (68)	16.12 (108)
St Kilda	10.8 (68)	7.10 (52)

=== Week one ===
	Qualifying Finals
Saturday, 4 September (7:20 pm)	Collingwood 17.22 (124)	def.	Western Bulldogs 8.14 (62)	MCG (crowd: 66,545)	Report
Friday, 3 September (7:45 pm)	Geelong 11.13 (79)	def. by	St Kilda 12.11 (83)	MCG (crowd: 63,608)	Report

	Elimination Finals
Sunday, 5 September (2:40 pm)	Sydney 14.15 (99)	def.	Carlton 13.16 (94)	ANZ Stadium (crowd: 41,596)	Report
Saturday, 4 September (1:20 pm)	Fremantle 14.10 (94)	def.	Hawthorn 8.16 (64)	Subiaco Oval (crowd: 42,719)	Report
Geelong and St Kilda played each other in a finals match for the third consecutive year, in the second qualifying final. A potential go-ahead goal by Cameron Ling with one minute remaining was disallowed because Cameron Mooney pushed James Gwilt in the back during the tackle which set up the shot on goal; although controversial, the AFL later endorsed the decision.; Carlton played its first match at ANZ Stadium since round 1, 2003.

=== Week two ===
	Semi-Finals
Saturday, 11 September (7:20 pm)	Western Bulldogs 11.11 (77)	def.	Sydney 10.12 (72)	MCG (crowd: 39,596)	Report
Friday, 10 September (7:45 pm)	Geelong 20.15 (135)	def.	Fremantle 10.6 (66)	MCG (crowd: 45,056)	Report
The crowd of 39,596 for the Western Bulldogs vs. Sydney match was the lowest crowd for a finals match at the MCG since 1934.; Geelong's victory over Fremantle put it into its fourth preliminary final in a row, and its third against Collingwood in that sequence.

=== Week three ===
	Preliminary Finals
Friday, 17 September (7:45 pm)	Collingwood 18.12 (120)	def.	Geelong 11.13 (79)	MCG (crowd: 95,241)	Report
Saturday, 18 September (7:20 pm)	St Kilda 13.10 (88)	def.	Western Bulldogs 8.16 (64)	MCG (crowd: 62,694)	Report
The two preliminary final matchups remained unchanged from 2009.; Geelong's half-time deficit of 62 points against Collingwood was its highest in any match since round 18, 1998.; The Western Bulldogs' loss to St Kilda was the third consecutive year in which their season ended with a loss in a preliminary final.

=== Weeks four/five ===
Grand final
Saturday, 25 September (2:30 pm)	Collingwood	drew with	St Kilda	MCG (crowd: 100,016)	Report
4.2 (26); 7.8 (50); 7.13 (55); 9.14 (68)	Q1; Q2; Q3; Final	3.2 (20); 4.2 (26); 7.5 (47); 10.8 (68)	Umpires: Chamberlain, Rosebury, Ryan; Norm Smith Medal: Lenny Hayes; Television broadcast: Seven / 7mate National anthem: Cameron and Taylor Henderson
Cloke 2 Jolly, Blair, Didak, Thomas, Macaffer, O'Brien, Davis	Goals	Riewoldt, Milne, Goddard 2 Schneider, Koschitzke, Gilbert, Hayes
Shaw, Thomas, Swan, N. Brown, Maxwell, Pendlebury	Best	Hayes, Goddard, Fisher, Gilbert, Gwilt, Schneider
Prestigiacomo (groin), replaced in the side by N. Brown	Injuries	Gardiner (hamstring)
This was the second time that these two teams met each other in a Grand Final. The first was the 1966 Grand Final, the year of St Kilda's first and only premiership, which they won by just one point.; St Kilda made consecutive appearances in the Grand Final for the first time since 1965 and 1966.; Geelong missed the Grand Final for the first time since 2006.; The match was the third drawn Grand Final, and the first since 1977.; The crowd of 100,016 was the highest at a game since the 1986 VFL Grand Final.

==== Grand final replay ====
Grand final Replay
Saturday, 2 October (2:30 pm)	Collingwood	def.	St Kilda	MCG (crowd: 93,853)	Report
3.2 (20); 6.5 (41); 11.8 (74); 16.12 (108)	Q1; Q2; Q3; Final	0.2 (2); 1.8 (14); 4.9 (33); 7.10 (52)	Umpires: Chamberlain, Rosebury, Ryan; Norm Smith Medal: Scott Pendlebury; Television broadcast: Seven / 7mate National anthem: Julie Anthony
Sidebottom, Didak, Wellingham, Macaffer, Dawes 2 Thomas, Swan, Johnson, O'Brien, Jolly, Goldsack 1	Goals	Milne 2 Dal Santo, Goddard, Hayes, Gilbert, Koschitzke 1
Pendlebury, Jolly, N. Brown, Sidebottom, Ball, Shaw, Thomas, Wellingham	Best	Goddard, Gwilt, Dawson, Gilbert, Jones
Reid (leg)	Injuries	Eddy (arm), Fisher (hamstring)
The AFL announced in the lead-up to the match that, should the replay have been drawn, it would have been decided in extra time, rather than by another replay.

== Season records ==
- Biggest margin: 116 points – Hawthorn, 24.11 (155) vs Fremantle 5.9 (39), Aurora Stadium, round 21
- Smallest margin (excluding draws): 1 point –
  - Collingwood, 12.14 (86) vs Melbourne 12.13 (85), MCG, round 2
  - Port Adelaide, 8.13 (61) vs West Coast 8.12 (60), AAMI Stadium, round 20
- Drawn games:
  - Melbourne 11.10 (76) vs Collingwood 9.22 (76), MCG, round 12
  - St Kilda 14.3 (87) vs Hawthorn 13.9 (87), Etihad Stadium, round 17
  - Collingwood 9.14 (68) vs St Kilda 10.8 (68), MCG, Grand Final
- Highest score: 24.18 (162) – Collingwood, Essendon 10.4 (64) vs 24.18 (162), MCG, round 20
- Highest aggregate score: 40.17 (257) – Carlton 16.6 (102) vs Collingwood 24.11 (155), MCG, round 6
- Lowest score: 3.12 (30) – Port Adelaide, 3.12 (30) vs Richmond 10.17 (77), AAMI Stadium, round 10
- Lowest aggregate score: 13.17 (95) – Western Bulldogs 6.10 (46) vs St Kilda 7.7 (49), Etihad Stadium, round 6
- Longest winning streak: 9 games – Collingwood, rounds 13–21
- Longest losing streak: 9 games –
  - Richmond, rounds 1–9
  - Port Adelaide, rounds 8–16
- Most goals kicked by a player in a match: 12.2 (74) – Mark LeCras (West Coast), Final score: Essendon 14.16 (100) vs 20.12 (132), Etihad Stadium, round 16

== Awards ==
- The Brownlow Medal was awarded to Chris Judd of Carlton who received 30 votes.
- The Norm Smith Medal was awarded to Lenny Hayes of St Kilda for the drawn Grand Final. Scott Pendlebury was awarded the second medal in the Replay.
- The AFL Rising Star was awarded to Dan Hannebery of Sydney, who received the maximum number of votes (45).
- The Coleman Medal was awarded to Jack Riewoldt of Richmond, who kicked 78 goals during the home and away season.
- The Wooden Spoon was "awarded" to the West Coast Eagles.
- The McClelland Trophy was awarded to Collingwood.
- The AFL Players Association awards were as follows:
  - The Leigh Matthews Trophy was awarded to Dane Swan of Collingwood, for being the Most Valuable Player throughout the premiership season.
  - The Robert Rose Award went to Luke Hodge of Hawthorn, for being the Most Courageous Player throughout the premiership season.
  - The Best Captain award went to Brett Kirk of Sydney, in his final season.
  - The best first year player award was won by Michael Barlow of Fremantle, despite only playing 13 games for the season.

=== Best and fairest ===
Club	Award name	Player	Ref.
Adelaide	Malcolm Blight Medal	Richard Douglas	
Brisbane Lions	Merrett–Murray Medal	Michael Rischitelli	
Carlton	John Nicholls Medal	Chris Judd	
Collingwood	Copeland Trophy	Dane Swan	
Essendon	Crichton Medal	Jobe Watson	
Fremantle	Doig Medal	David Mundy	
Geelong	Carji Greeves Medal	Joel Selwood	
Hawthorn	Peter Crimmins Medal	Luke Hodge	
Melbourne	Keith 'Bluey' Truscott Medal	Brad Green	
North Melbourne	Syd Barker Medal	Brent Harvey and Brady Rawlings	
Port Adelaide	John Cahill Medal	Kane Cornes	
Richmond	Jack Dyer Medal	Jack Riewoldt	
St Kilda	Trevor Barker Award	Lenny Hayes	
Sydney	Bob Skilton Medal	Kieren Jack	
West Coast	Club Champion Award	Mark LeCras	
Western Bulldogs	Charles Sutton Medal	Ryan Griffen	

=== AFL Rising Star ===
The AFL Rising Star is awarded to the best player who, as of the beginning of the season, is under the age of 21 and has played fewer than 10 games. Each week one player is nominated and at the end of the season a selection panel votes to select the overall winner.

Sydney's Dan Hannebery won the award for 2010, with the maximum 45 votes awarded to him.

Nominations

- Round 1 – Chris Yarran (Carlton)
- Round 2 – Dan Hannebery (Sydney)
- Round 3 – Ryan Bastinac (North Melbourne)
- Round 4 – Nic Naitanui (West Coast)
- Round 5 – Jack Trengove (Melbourne)
- Round 6 – Todd Banfield (Brisbane)
- Round 7 – Tom Scully (Melbourne)
- Round 8 – Jake Melksham (Essendon)
- Round 9 – Nathan Fyfe (Fremantle)
- Round 10 – Dustin Martin† (Richmond)
- Round 11 – Jordan Gysberts (Melbourne)
- Round 12 – Ben Reid (Collingwood)
- Round 13 – Tom Rockliff (Brisbane Lions)
- Round 14 – Ben Stratton (Hawthorn)
- Round 15 – Jack Redden (Brisbane Lions)
- Round 16 – Phil Davis (Adelaide)
- Round 17 – Jarrad Grant† (Western Bulldogs)
- Round 18 – Michael Hurley (Essendon)
- Round 19 – Jeff Garlett (Carlton)
- Round 20 – Jackson Trengove (Port Adelaide)
- Round 21 – Sam Wright (North Melbourne)
- Round 22 – Anthony Morabito (Fremantle)

† players ineligible due to tribunal sanction

Voting

- Dan Hannebery – 45
- Tom Scully – 35
- Tom Rockliff – 24
- Jack Trengove – 11
- Ryan Bastinac – 6
- Jeff Garlett – 5
- Nathan Fyfe – 3
- Michael Hurley – 2
- Nic Naitanui – 2
- Ben Reid – 1
- Ben Stratton – 1

=== Goal of the Year ===
The Australian Football League celebrates the best goal of the season through the annual Goal of the Year competition. From 2010 onwards, the commercial name for the award is the Panasonic Goal of the Year.

Lance 'Buddy' Franklin won the award for his running goal against Essendon in round 13. By winning the award Franklin became the fifth indigenous player to win the award since 2004.

Nominations

- Round 1 – Brendan Fevola (Brisbane)
- Round 2 – Michael Osborne (Hawthorn)
- Round 3 – Matthew Pavlich (Fremantle)
- Round 4 – Carl Peterson (Hawthorn)
- Round 5 – Stephen Milne (St Kilda)
- Round 6 – Daniel Bradshaw (Sydney)
- Round 7 – Jamie Bennell (Melbourne)
- Round 8 – Brent Harvey (North Melbourne)
- Round 9 – Brendan Fevola (Brisbane)
- Round 10 – Marc Murphy (Carlton)
- Round 11 – Stephen Milne (St Kilda)
- Round 12 – Stephen Milne (St Kilda)
- Round 13 – Lance Franklin (Hawthorn)
- Round 14 – Patrick Dangerfield (Adelaide)
- Round 15 – Rhyce Shaw (Sydney)
- Round 16 – Mark LeCras (West Coast)
- Round 17 – Mark LeCras (West Coast)
- Round 18 – Alan Didak (Collingwood)
- Round 19 – Chance Bateman (Hawthorn)
- Round 20 – Liam Jurrah (Melbourne)
- Round 21 – Cyril Rioli (Hawthorn)
- Round 22 – Lynden Dunn (Melbourne)

=== Mark of the Year ===
The Australian Football League celebrates the best mark of the season through the annual Mark of the Year competition. From 2009 onwards, the commercial name for the award is the Hungry Jack's Mark of the Year.

Liam Jurrah, of the Melbourne Football Club, won the award for his mark over the top of Port Adelaide's Nick Salter, in round 21. However, he hadn't been nominated as Mark of the Week, which was won by Brendon Goddard. This inconsistency arose because the Mark of the Week is decided by an online public vote, while the Mark of the Year is decided separately by a panel of experts.

Weekly winners

- Round 1 – Trent Cotchin (Richmond)
- Round 2 – Nick Riewoldt (St Kilda)
- Round 3 – Brett Ebert (Port Adelaide)
- Round 4 – Jesse White (Sydney)
- Round 5 – David Wojcinski (Geelong)
- Round 6 – Colin Sylvia (Melbourne)
- Round 7 – Jamie Bennell (Melbourne)
- Round 8 – Justin Koschitzke (St Kilda)
- Round 9 – Jack Riewoldt (Richmond)
- Round 10 – Carl Peterson (Hawthorn)
- Round 11 – Jack Riewoldt (Richmond)
- Round 12 – Justin Koschitzke (St Kilda)
- Round 13 – Michael Osborne (Hawthorn)
- Round 14 – Scott Gumbleton (Essendon)
- Round 15 – Jack Riewoldt (Richmond)
- Round 16 – Luke McPharlin (Fremantle)
- Round 17 – Aaron Edwards (North Melbourne)
- Round 18 – Darren Jolly (Collingwood)
- Round 19 – Dale Thomas (Collingwood)
- Round 20 – Nick Riewoldt (St Kilda)
- Round 21 – Brendon Goddard (St Kilda)
- Round 22 – Brendon Goddard (St Kilda)
- Overall winner: Liam Jurrah (Melbourne, round 21)

== Club leadership ==
Club	Coach	Captain(s)	Vice-captain(s) and/or "leadership group"
Adelaide	Neil Craig	Simon Goodwin	Brad Symes, Scott Stevens, Nathan van Berlo, Ben Rutten, Michael Doughty, Brett Burton and Tyson Edwards
Brisbane Lions	Michael Voss	Jonathan Brown	Simon Black, Luke Power, Jed Adcock and Daniel Merrett
Carlton	Brett Ratten	Chris Judd	Andrew Carrazzo, Michael Jamison, Kade Simpson, Heath Scotland and Simon Wiggins
Collingwood	Mick Malthouse	Nick Maxwell	Scott Pendlebury (vc), Dane Swan (deputy vc), Darren Jolly, Heath Shaw, Harry O'Brien, Shane O'Bree and Luke Ball
Essendon	Matthew Knights	Jobe Watson	Andrew Welsh
Fremantle	Mark Harvey	Matthew Pavlich	Paul Duffield, Michael Johnson, David Mundy, Aaron Sandilands, Antoni Grover and Des Headland
Geelong	Mark Thompson	Cameron Ling	Gary Ablett, Jr., Jimmy Bartel, Joel Corey, Corey Enright, Joel Selwood, James Kelly and Harry Taylor
Hawthorn	Alastair Clarkson	Sam Mitchell	Luke Hodge
Melbourne	Dean Bailey	James McDonald	Aaron Davey, Jared Rivers, Brent Moloney, Brad Green, Cameron Bruce and Brad Miller
North Melbourne	Brad Scott	Brent Harvey	Drew Petrie
Port Adelaide	Matthew Primus	Domenic Cassisi	Dean Brogan and Jacob Surjan
Richmond	Damien Hardwick	Chris Newman	Nathan Foley, Brett Deledio, Daniel Jackson, Trent Cotchin and Troy Simmonds
St Kilda	Ross Lyon	Nick Riewoldt	Lenny Hayes (vc)
Sydney	Paul Roos	Craig Bolton, Adam Goodes and Brett Kirk	
West Coast	John Worsfold	Darren Glass	Dean Cox, Matthew Priddis, Adam Selwood, Beau Waters, Shannon Hurn and Josh Kennedy
Western Bulldogs	Rodney Eade	Brad Johnson	Daniel Giansiracusa, Matthew Boyd, Adam Cooney, Robert Murphy, Daniel Cross, Dale Morris and Shaun Higgins

== Umpiring and rule changes ==
No major changes to the rules were introduced for the 2010 season. Minor adjustments to the tribunal rules were made, including adding a provision to report players for diving or staging. The 2010 NAB Cup pre-season competition trialled three new rules: allowing boundary umpires to award free kicks, letting the players, not the umpire, decide if they want to use the advantage rule and penalising players who push the ball under another player.

== Coach changes ==
Coach	Club	Date	New coach	Notes
Mark Williams	Port Adelaide	11 July 2010	Matthew Primus	Retirement, effective after round 15 match against Collingwood.
Matthew Knights	Essendon	29 August 2010	James Hird	Sacked, after final match of season.
Paul Roos	Sydney	—N/a	John Longmire	Retired at the end of the season.
Mark Thompson	Geelong	4 October 2010	Chris Scott	Resignation.
