= Ben Stratton =

Australian rules footballer

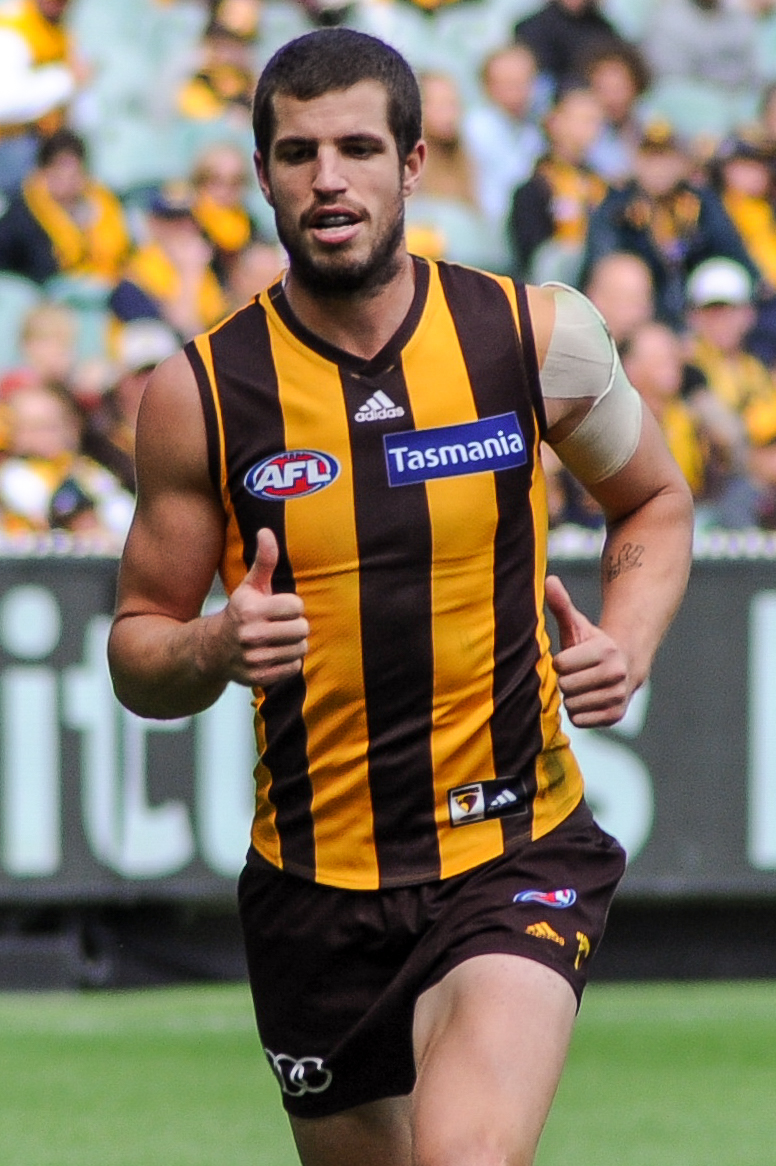
- Stratton playing for Hawthorn in April 2017

Personal information
- Full name: Benjamin Stratton
- Born: 1 March 1989 (age 37); Western Australia
- Original team: East Perth
- Draft: No. 46, 2009 national draft
- Debut: Round 3, 2010, Hawthorn vs. Western Bulldogs, at Etihad Stadium
- Height: 189 cm (6 ft 2 in)
- Weight: 88 kg (194 lb)
- Position: Defender

Playing career^{1}
Years	Club	Games (Goals)
2010–2020	Hawthorn	202 (2)
- ^{1} Playing statistics correct to the end of 2020.

Career highlights
- 3× AFL premiership player: 2013–2015; Hawthorn captain: 2019–2020

Benjamin Stratton (born 1 March 1989) is a former Australian rules footballer who played for the Hawthorn Football Club in the Australian Football League (AFL).

== Early career ==
Stratton was educated at Dunsborough Primary School and MacKillop Catholic College in Busselton. He played for the Augusta Margaret River Football Club before being recruited to East Perth. He then spent three years playing in the West Australian Football League (WAFL), playing 23 senior games and kicked three goals for East Perth. A medium-sized defender, Stratton was drafted from East Perth with the 46th selection in the 2009 AFL draft.

== AFL career ==
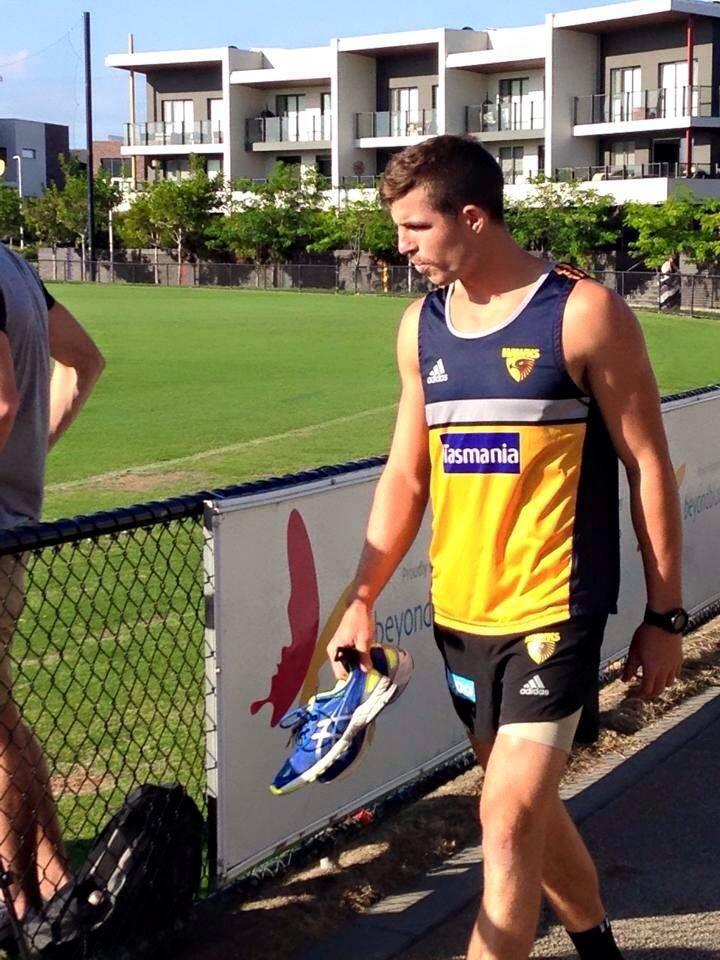
Stratton in January 2015

Stratton made his AFL debut against Western Bulldogs in round 3 of the 2010 AFL season. Despite being a mature-age rookie, Stratton was awarded the AFL Rising Star nomination for round 14, against the Bulldogs once more.

He dislocated his knee in the third quarter of the Hawks’ win against Richmond in round 3 of the 2011 season and had surgery to repair his posterior cruciate ligament and have the lateral ligament in his right knee stabilised. He missed most of the remainder of the year, he returned to play in the last home and away game of the season against the Gold Coast Suns and all the 2011 final series.

After a solid 2012 season where he played every game, he was singled out for praise by coach Alastair Clarkson after performing a match saving tackle on Adelaide's Patrick Dangerfield in the Preliminary Final. However, the Hawks lost the Grand Final to Sydney by 10 points, with Stratton having a quiet game, but restricting Sam Reid to one goal.

Stratton again played every game in 2013, including notching up his 50th consecutive game in the first qualifying final against Sydney. Stratton again played in the Grand Final, with Hawthorn defeating Fremantle and granting him his first premiership.

Stratton's consecutive run was broken in 2014 after a hamstring injury forced him to miss the first 4 rounds of the year. He would return to the side, playing consistent football. Hawthorn would triumph in the 2014 Grand Final over the Sydney Swans, giving Stratton his second premiership.

Stratton played all but one game in the 2015 season, generally performing well and picking up his third premiership after Hawthorn defeated West Coast in the Grand Final.

Despite suffering from a pectoral injury in round 20, Stratton was regarded as having a good 2016 season, drawing especial praise for his performance in round 3 on Western Bulldogs forward Jake Stringer.

Stratton had a good start to 2017, but he injured his posterior cruciate ligament once again in round 8, sidelining him for the rest of the season.

Stratton played his 150th game against Melbourne in round 4 of the 2018 season. Stratton had a decent year in 2018, finishing seventh in Hawthorn's best and fairest medal tally.

=== Captaincy ===
He was appointed captain of the club at the start of the 2019 season. In round 13 Stratton was suspended for repeatedly pinching Essendon opponent Orazio Fantasia as well as stomping on Shaun McKernan. He received a one week suspension for each incident. Stratton was the subject of a considerable negative reaction for these actions, with Hawthorn CEO (Justin Reeves) declaring that he had 'let himself and the club down'.

On the 14th of September 2020, it was announced that Stratton would retire from the AFL following the 2020 season. He played his final game for Hawthorn the following Sunday in a 108-57 win over the Gold Coast Suns.

== Statistics ==
Legend
G	Goals	K	Kicks	D	Disposals	T	Tackles
B	Behinds	H	Handballs	M	Marks

Season	Team	No.	Games	Totals							Averages (per game)							Votes
Season	Team	No.	Games	G	B	K	H	D	M	T	G	B	K	H	D	M	T	Votes
2010	Hawthorn	39	21	1	0	184	107	291	108	43	0.0	0.0	8.8	5.1	13.9	5.1	2.0	0
2011	Hawthorn	24	6	0	0	39	34	73	24	21	0.0	0.0	6.5	5.7	12.2	4.0	3.5	0
2012	Hawthorn	24	25	0	0	175	118	293	97	70	0.0	0.0	7.0	4.7	11.7	3.9	2.8	0
2013^{#}	Hawthorn	24	25	0	1	192	175	367	123	74	0.0	0.0	7.7	7.0	14.7	4.9	3.0	0
2014^{#}	Hawthorn	24	15	0	0	98	98	196	59	46	0.0	0.0	6.5	6.5	13.1	3.9	3.1	0
2015^{#}	Hawthorn	24	25	0	4	158	111	269	92	72	0.0	0.2	6.3	4.4	10.8	3.7	2.9	0
2016	Hawthorn	24	21	0	1	146	107	253	96	47	0.0	0.1	7.0	5.1	12.1	4.6	2.2	0
2017	Hawthorn	24	8	0	0	54	50	104	27	24	0.0	0.0	6.8	6.3	13.0	3.4	3.0	0
2018	Hawthorn	24	23	0	0	164	116	280	93	44	0.0	0.0	7.1	5.0	12.2	4.0	1.9	0
2019	Hawthorn	24	19	0	0	96	79	175	64	29	0.0	0.0	5.1	4.2	9.2	3.4	1.5	0
2020 (Note: The 2020 season was played with 17 home-and-away matches per team (down from 22) and 16-minute quarters with time on (down from 20-minute quarters with time on) due to the impact of the COVID-19 pandemic.)	Hawthorn	24	14	1	0	66	55	121	41	17	0.1	0.0	4.7	3.9	8.6	2.9	1.2	0
Career			202	2	6	1372	1050	2422	824	487	0.0	0.0	6.8	5.2	12.0	4.1	2.4	0

== Honours and achievements ==
Team

- 3× AFL premiership player (Hawthorn): 2013, 2014, 2015
- 2× Minor premiership (Hawthorn): 2012, 2013

Individual

- Hawthorn captain: 2019–2020
- Lethal Award: 2018
- Hawthorn best clubman: 2015
- Hawthorn most consistent player: 2013
- Hawthorn best first year player (debut season): 2010
- AFL Rising Star nominee: 2010
- Hawthorn life member
