= Jason Winderlich =

Australian rules footballer

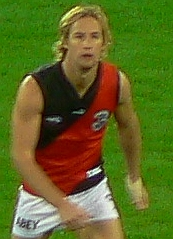

Personal information
- Full name: Jason Winderlich
- Born: 10 October 1984 (age 42)
- Original team: Gippsland Power (TAC Cup)
- Draft: No. 11, 2002 National Draft
- Height: 188 cm (6 ft 2 in)
- Weight: 82 kg (181 lb)
- Positions: Forward, midfielder

Playing career^{1}
| Years | Club | Games (Goals) |
| 2003–2015 | Essendon | 129 (83) |
- ^{1} Playing statistics correct to the end of 2015.

Career highlights
- Yiooken Award 2009

Jason Winderlich (born 10 October 1984) is an Australian rules footballer who currently plays for Thorpdale in the Mid Gippsland Football Netball League (MGFNL). He previously played professionally for the Essendon Football Club in the Australian Football League (AFL).

In 2024, Winderlich was named at Number 93 in Don The Stat’s Top 100 Essendon Players since 1980.

== Career ==
=== AFL ===
Originally from Thorpdale, Victoria, he was drafted in the first round of the 2002 AFL draft from the Gippsland Power in the TAC Cup.

In June 2008, after playing 26 games in a season and a half, he underwent back surgery to repair a prolapsed disc, missing the rest of the year. He returned the following season to have one of his best seasons, earning 10 Brownlow Medal votes to be the equal leader for Essendon and finishing fifth in the club's best and fairest award.

In round 4, 2011 Winderlich suffered a serious ACL injury which ended his 2011 season.

In August 2014, Winderlich announced he would retire at seasons end; however, after the end of the Essendon's finals campaign, it was publicly revealed that he was contemplating playing on. After reports he had chosen to continue his career at Richmond, Winderlich announced in October that he would be staying with Essendon to continue his career. He managed only one match for 2015 due to a back injury, and he announced his proper retirement in September.

=== Post-AFL ===
On 3 August 2024, Winderlich suffered a spinal injury while playing for Thorpdale in the Mid Gippsland Football Netball League (MGFNL). Winderlich took a knock to the head after collecting the ball during the second quarter, and had to be flown by helicopter to The Alfred Hospital in Melbourne. The game, which was being played against Toora, was abandoned.

== Statistics ==
Legend
| G | Goals | K | Kicks | D | Disposals | T | Tackles |
| B | Behinds | H | Handballs | M | Marks |

| Season | Team | No. | Games | Totals | | | | | | | Averages (per game) | | | | | | |
| Season | Team | No. | Games | G | B | K | H | D | M | T | G | B | K | H | D | M | T |
|---|---|---|---|---|---|---|---|---|---|---|---|---|---|---|---|---|---|
| 2003 | Essendon | 8 | 3 | 2 | 0 | 11 | 7 | 18 | 7 | 6 | 0.7 | 0.0 | 3.7 | 2.3 | 6.0 | 2.3 | 2.0 |
| 2004 | Essendon | 8 | 6 | 1 | 1 | 23 | 15 | 38 | 14 | 10 | 0.2 | 0.2 | 3.8 | 2.5 | 6.3 | 2.3 | 1.7 |
| 2005 | Essendon | 8 | 12 | 4 | 2 | 59 | 54 | 113 | 35 | 19 | 0.3 | 0.2 | 4.9 | 4.5 | 9.4 | 2.9 | 1.6 |
| 2006 | Essendon | 8 | 9 | 3 | 0 | 58 | 47 | 105 | 49 | 18 | 0.3 | 0.0 | 6.4 | 5.2 | 11.7 | 5.4 | 2.0 |
| 2007 | Essendon | 8 | 17 | 6 | 6 | 190 | 130 | 320 | 132 | 40 | 0.4 | 0.4 | 11.2 | 7.6 | 18.8 | 7.8 | 2.4 |
| 2008 | Essendon | 8 | 9 | 5 | 2 | 81 | 74 | 155 | 44 | 20 | 0.6 | 0.2 | 9.0 | 8.2 | 17.2 | 4.9 | 2.2 |
| 2009 | Essendon | 8 | 19 | 17 | 8 | 191 | 196 | 387 | 122 | 81 | 0.9 | 0.4 | 10.0 | 10.3 | 20.4 | 6.4 | 4.3 |
| 2010 | Essendon | 8 | 19 | 2 | 12 | 186 | 232 | 418 | 99 | 92 | 0.1 | 0.6 | 9.8 | 12.2 | 22.0 | 5.2 | 4.8 |
| 2011 | Essendon | 8 | 4 | 6 | 0 | 19 | 26 | 45 | 10 | 8 | 1.5 | 0.0 | 4.8 | 6.5 | 11.2 | 2.5 | 2.0 |
| 2012 | Essendon | 8 | 2 | 5 | 0 | 14 | 8 | 22 | 10 | 4 | 2.5 | 0.0 | 7.0 | 4.0 | 11.0 | 5.0 | 2.0 |
| 2013 | Essendon | 8 | 12 | 17 | 8 | 103 | 74 | 177 | 79 | 30 | 1.4 | 0.7 | 8.6 | 6.2 | 14.8 | 6.6 | 2.5 |
| 2014 | Essendon | 8 | 16 | 15 | 8 | 123 | 110 | 233 | 75 | 35 | 0.9 | 0.5 | 7.7 | 6.9 | 14.6 | 4.7 | 2.2 |
| 2015 | Essendon | 8 | 1 | 0 | 0 | 2 | 4 | 6 | 1 | 3 | 0.0 | 0.0 | 2.0 | 4.0 | 6.0 | 1.0 | 3.0 |
| Career | | | 129 | 83 | 47 | 1060 | 977 | 2037 | 677 | 366 | 0.6 | 0.4 | 8.2 | 7.6 | 15.8 | 5.2 | 2.8 |
