= 2010 AFL Rising Star =

Australian rules football award

2010 NAB AFL Rising Star
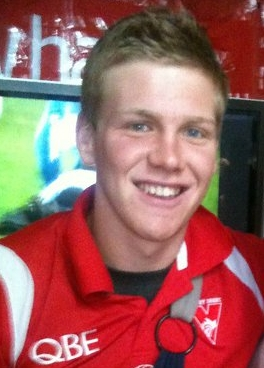
- Dan Hannebery, winner of the 2010 AFL Rising Star award
- Sponsored by: National Australia Bank
- Date: 8 September
- Country: Australia
- Ron Evans medallist: Dan Hannebery (Sydney)

The NAB AFL Rising Star award is given annually to a stand out young player in the Australian Football League. The 2010 Ron Evans Medal was awarded to Dan Hannebery of the Sydney Swans.

== Eligibility ==
Every round, an Australian Football League rising star nomination is given to a stand out young player. To be eligible for the award, a player must be under 21 on 1 January of that year, have played 10 or fewer senior games and not been suspended during the season. At the end of the year, one of the 22 nominees is the winner of award.

== Nominations ==
Round	Player	Club	Ref.
1	Chris Yarran	Carlton	
2	Dan Hannebery	Sydney	
3	Ryan Bastinac	North Melbourne	
4	Nic Naitanui	West Coast	
5	Jack Trengove	Melbourne	
6	Todd Banfield	Brisbane Lions	
7	Tom Scully	Melbourne	
8	Jake Melksham	Essendon	
9	Nat Fyfe	Fremantle	
10	Dustin Martin*	Richmond	
11	Jordan Gysberts	Melbourne	
12	Ben Reid	Collingwood	
13	Tom Rockliff	Brisbane Lions	
14	Ben Stratton	Hawthorn	
15	Jack Redden	Brisbane Lions	
16	Phil Davis	Adelaide	
17	Jarrad Grant*	Western Bulldogs	
18	Michael Hurley	Essendon	
19	Jeff Garlett	Carlton	
20	Jackson Trengove	Port Adelaide	
21	Sam Wright	North Melbourne	
22	Anthony Morabito	Fremantle	

*ineligible to win the NAB Rising Star due to suspension.

== Final voting ==
	Player	Club	Votes
1	Dan Hannebery	Sydney	45
2	Tom Scully	Melbourne	35
3	Tom Rockliff	Brisbane Lions	24
4	Jack Trengove	Melbourne	11
5	Ryan Bastinac	North Melbourne	6
6	Jeff Garlett	Carlton	5
7	Nat Fyfe	Fremantle	3
8	Michael Hurley	Essendon	2
8	Nic Naitanui	West Coast	2
10	Ben Reid	Collingwood	1
10	Ben Stratton	Hawthorn	1
Source: AFL Record Season Guide 2015
