= Anthony Morabito =

Australian rules footballer (born 1991)

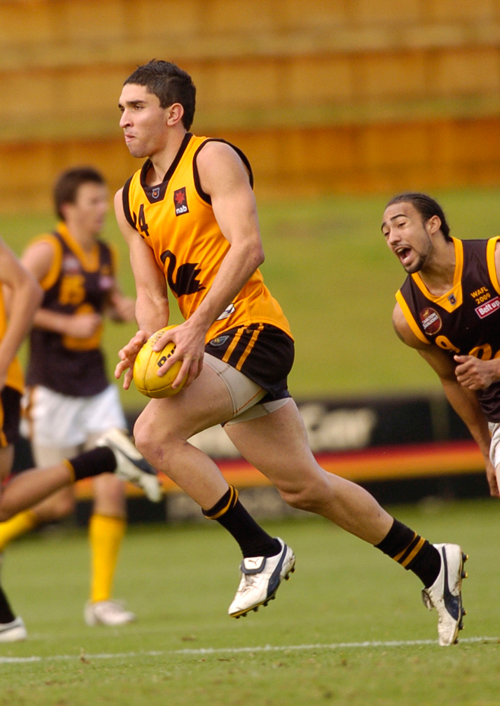

Personal information
- Full name: Anthony David Morabito
- Born: 29 October 1991 (age 35); Harvey, Western Australia, Australia
- Original team: Harvey Brunswick Leschenault (SWFL)/Peel(WAFL)
- Draft: No. 4, 2009 national draft No. 50, 2016 rookie draft
- Height: 189 cm (6 ft 2 in)
- Weight: 98 kg (216 lb)
- Position: Midfielder

Playing career^{1}
Years	Club	Games (Goals)
2010–2016	Fremantle	26 (14)
- ^{1} Playing statistics correct to the end of 2016.

Career highlights
- 2010 AFL Rising Star nominee

Anthony Morabito (born 29 October 1991) is a former professional Australian rules footballer who played for the Fremantle Football Club in the Australian Football League (AFL). He was delisted in 2016 after multiple knee reconstructions and several other injuries.

== Junior football career ==
Morabito was a tall, quick, powerful midfielder, who was selected by Fremantle with their first round selection (fourth overall) in the 2009 AFL draft. Originally from Harvey, he played for Peel Thunder in the WAFL and represented Western Australia in the 2007 Under 16s, 2008 Under 18s and 2009 AFL Under 18 Championships. He performed very well at the 2009 Championships, being named in the Under 18 All-Australian Team and awarded the most valuable player in Western Australia's championship-winning side. He was the first of thirteen WAFL-based players to be selected in the 2009 Draft.

After being suggested as a possible top-10 selection in the draft following the National Under 18 Championships, Morabito was correctly predicted to be the fourth overall selection in the lead-up to the draft. He was compared to Adam Goodes due to his appearance, size and versatile playing style.

== Senior football career ==
He made his WAFL senior debut for Peel in the opening round of the 2009 WAFL season, and played in Peel's first eight games before joining the state Under 18s squad ahead of the national championships. However, he only played a further two games for Peel, with a thigh injury hampering his second half of the season. He attended the AFL draft camp, but was unable to participate in the testing due to the injury. His outstanding first half of the season was enough to win him the 2009 WAFL Rising Star award.

In round 21 of the 2010 AFL season, Morabito missed his first game since his debut when he was one of seven players rested by Fremantle from their game against Hawthorn at Aurora Stadium in Launceston, Tasmania. He returned to the team the following week and was nominated for the 2010 AFL Rising Star award.

In the 2010 Elimination Final, against Hawthorn he kicked one of the best goals of the year receiving a handpass from Michael Johnson on the wing and then running into the forward line, bouncing 3 times and kicking on the run from about 40m out. Fremantle went on to beat Hawthorn by 30 points to secure a semi final berth against Geelong.

=== Injuries ===
In December 2010, during pre-season training, Morabito ruptured his anterior cruciate ligament in his left knee, requiring a full knee reconstruction. He returned to play for Peel Thunder in the WAFL in March 2012 However, a series of leg injuries and a concussion limited him to only seven games for Peel before he again injured his reconstructed knee at training in July, requiring a second reconstruction operation.

Aiming for a return to football at the beginning of the 2013 AFL season, seven or eight months after his second surgery, Morabito recommenced training late in 2012. In January 2013, he again injured the same knee during a routine training drill, requiring a third knee reconstruction and ruling him out from playing for another season.

=== Return to senior football ===
After 1369 days and three knee re-constructions, Morabito returned in Round 16 of the 2014 season against Melbourne in Darwin. Coming on as the substitute, Morabito showed promising signs he could re-capture the form shown in his first season, collecting 8 disposals in just over a quarter of football. The substitute rule did not exist the last time Morabito had played for Fremantle.

After missing all of 2015, he was delisted in October, however, he was re-drafted in the 2016 rookie draft. He was however, delisted again at the conclusion of the 2016 season after failing to play an AFL match during the season.

In 2017, Morabito joined Claremont in the West Australian Football League (WAFL). Unfortunately, after 6 (4 league, 2 reserves) games in 2017 and further knees surgery in December 2017, Morabito announced his retirement from football before the start of the 2018 season.

== Statistics ==
Statistics are correct to the end of the 2016 season

Legend
G	Goals	K	Kicks	D	Disposals	T	Tackles
B	Behinds	H	Handballs	M	Marks

Season	Team	No.	Games	Totals							Averages (per game)						
Season	Team	No.	Games	G	B	K	H	D	M	T	G	B	K	H	D	M	T
2010	Fremantle	2	23	13	18	183	121	304	65	75	0.6	0.8	8.0	5.3	13.2	2.8	3.3
2011	Fremantle	2	0	—	—	—	—	—	—	—	—	—	—	—	—	—	—
2012	Fremantle	2	0	—	—	—	—	—	—	—	—	—	—	—	—	—	—
2013	Fremantle	2	0	—	—	—	—	—	—	—	—	—	—	—	—	—	—
2014	Fremantle	2	3	1	1	15	12	27	2	4	0.3	0.3	5.0	4.0	9.0	0.7	1.3
2015	Fremantle	2	0	—	—	—	—	—	—	—	—	—	—	—	—	—	—
2016	Fremantle	2	0	—	—	—	—	—	—	—	—	—	—	—	—	—	—
Career			26	14	19	198	133	331	67	79	0.5	0.7	7.6	5.1	12.7	2.6	3.0
