= Jake Melksham =

Australian rules footballer (born 1991)

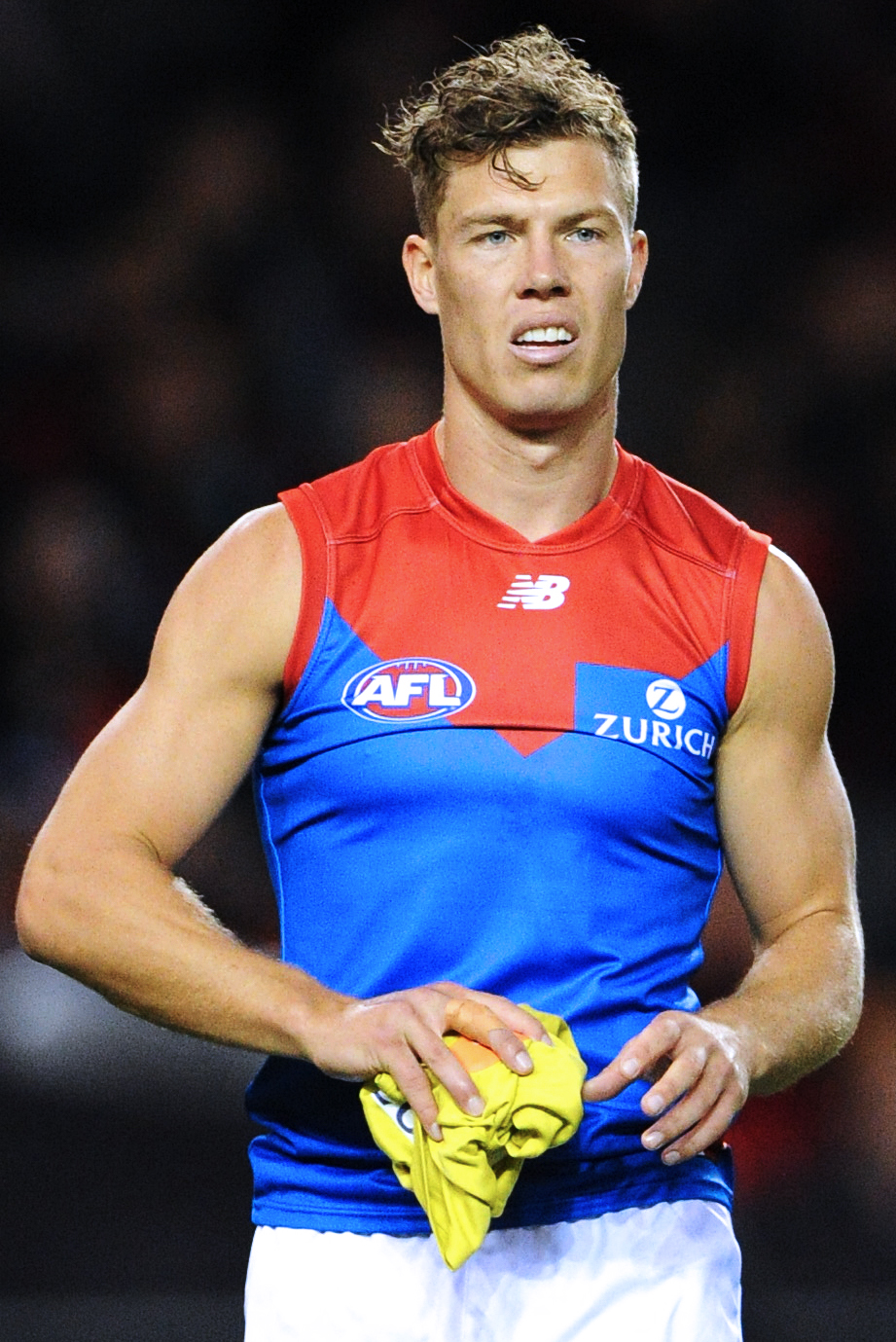
- Melksham playing for Melbourne in April 2018

Personal information
- Full name: Jake Melksham
- Born: 29 August 1991 (age 35)
- Original team: Calder Cannons (TAC Cup)
- Draft: No. 10, 2009 national draft (Essendon); No. 12, 2024 rookie draft (Melbourne)
- Debut: Round 3, 2010, Essendon vs. Carlton, at MCG
- Height: 186 cm (6 ft 1 in)
- Weight: 86 kg (190 lb)
- Position: Forward

Playing career^{1}
Years	Club	Games (Goals)
2010–2015	Essendon	114 (57)
2016–2026	Melbourne	140 (172)
Total		255 (229)
- ^{1} Playing statistics correct to the end of round 22, 2026.

Career highlights
- 2010 AFL Rising Star nominee; VFL premiership player: 2022

Jake Melksham (born 29 August 1991) is a former professional Australian rules footballer who played for the Essendon Football Club and Melbourne Football Club in the Australian Football League (AFL). A midfielder, 1.86 metres (6 ft 1 in) tall and weighing 83 kilograms (183 lb), Melksham also has the ability to play as a defender, primarily as a half-back flanker. Growing up in Glenroy, Victoria, he played top-level football early when he joined the Calder Cannons' under 18 side in the TAC Cup at the age of sixteen. He spent three years playing for the Calder Cannons, winning a premiership in his final junior year. His achievements as a junior include state representation and the TAC Medal as the best player on the ground in the TAC Cup Grand Final.

Melksham's late surge in his draft year saw him recruited by Essendon with the tenth selection in the 2009 AFL draft. He made his AFL debut in the 2010 season and was rewarded with an AFL Rising Star nomination. He spent six seasons with Essendon, which peaked with a fifth-place finish in the best and fairest, and after 114 games with the club, he was traded to Melbourne during the 2015 trade period. Before he could play his first match with Melbourne, he was suspended for the 2016 season for his involvement in the Essendon supplements saga.

In November 2023, Melksham was delisted by Melbourne, then re-listed in the subsequent rookie draft. He retired at the end of the 2026 season.

== Early life ==
Melksham grew up in Glenroy, Victoria; as a junior, he played for the Oak Park Football Club in the Essendon District Football League, and attended Penleigh and Essendon Grammar School. Joining the Calder Cannons under 18 side in the TAC Cup as a bottom-aged player in 2007 at sixteen years of age, a bout of osteitis pubis set in towards the end of the year, which hampered his summer training and saw him miss several games during the 2008 season. In 2008, he was awarded a scholarship with the Australian Institute of Sport (AIS) as part of AIS-AFL Academy in their eleventh intake.

Melksham spent his final year as a junior playing for the Calder Cannons, which saw the club win their fifth premiership when they defeated the Dandenong Stringrays by fourteen points in the grand final. His performance in the grand final saw him adjudged the best on ground and he was awarded the TAC Medal after he recorded twenty-four disposals and seven inside-50s. He received mid-year state honours when he represented Vic Metro in the 2009 AFL Under 18 Championships and prior to the start of the competition he was labelled by The Age journalist, Emma Quayle, as one of the "players to watch" during the championships. He averaged eighteen disposals during the championships and ranked second overall for Vic Metro in clearances and score assists, behind eventual number one draft pick, Tom Scully. After a slow start to the year, he had a strong finish to the year, which elevated his draft chances to inside the top ten. Furthermore, AFL talent manager, Kevin Sheehan, likened him to St Kilda player and three-time All-Australian, Lenny Hayes.

== AFL career ==
=== 2010–2012: Early career ===
Melksham was recruited by the Essendon Football Club with their first selection and tenth overall in the 2009 national draft. The Age journalist, Will Brodie, predicted he would debut and play in the midfield early in the season and he made his debut in the twenty point win against Carlton at the Melbourne Cricket Ground in round three. He played the next two matches before he was omitted for the round six match against Hawthorn at the Melbourne Cricket Ground; he returned the next week for the three-point loss against Port Adelaide at Etihad Stadium where he kicked his first AFL goal. He was rewarded with the round eight nomination in the AFL Rising Star after he recorded fourteen possessions, three clearances, three tackles and a goal in the twelve point win against St Kilda at Etihad Stadium. He missed the round ten match against the Western Bulldogs after he sprained his ankle during the thirty-five-point win against Richmond the week before, he returned the next week for the nine-point loss against Sydney at the Sydney Cricket Ground. He played the next four out of five matches, missing the round fifteen match against Melbourne due to being rested, before he was dropped for the round seventeen match against North Melbourne at Etihad Stadium. He played the next three weeks in the Victorian Football League (VFL) for Essendon's affiliate team, the Bendigo Bombers, before returning to the senior side in round twenty for the ninety-eight-point loss against Collingwood at the Melbourne Cricket Ground and he played the remainder of the year to finish with fourteen matches for the season. Despite being drafted as a midfielder, he played the majority of the season on the half-back flank and struggled for continuity as he played no more than four matches consecutively at a time.

Incoming coach, James Hird earmarked a greater role in the midfield for Melksham during the 2011 season and he performed strongly in the midfield during the 2011 NAB Cup with The Age reporter, Michael Gleeson noting Melksham would have a bigger impact on the field in 2011 compared to his debut year. He went on to play every match during the season and was praised for his performances in the midfield by many in the industry, some of which were former player, Garry Lyon, and journalists, Ashley Porter and Martin Blake. In round fifteen, he kicked the match-winning goal in Essendon's four-point win against the previously undefeated Geelong at Etihad Stadium and was named best on ground, earning three Brownlow votes for the first time in his career. He played his first final in the sixty-two-point loss against Carlton in the first elimination final at the Melbourne Cricket Ground. At the end of the season he was noted as an emerging leader of the club by Herald Sun journalist, Sam Edmund.

After a strong pre-season, Melksham had strong form during the 2012 NAB Cup, which led to former Essendon player and The Age journalist, Matthew Lloyd naming Melksham as one of the players who would have a breakout season. After the club had an outstanding start to the season where the team won eight out of nine matches, with the only loss being one point to Collingwood in the Anzac Day clash; hype surrounding the club was immense with 1987 premiership coach, Robert Walls denoting the club could win a premiership, indicating the improvement of the players, especially Melksham, was one of the reasons for a potential flag. Garry Lyon also noted the improvement of Melksham as one of the reasons for Essendon's strong start to the season, along with The Age journalist, Martin Flanagan, praising Melksham and his contribution to the club's fortunes. After round nine, the club lost ten of the final thirteen matches, including the final seven to finish outside of the top eight; the decline in the teams' performance saw Melksham's form dip as well, with The Age journalist, Rohan Connolly stating Melksham's development had "stalled". Despite being one of two players to play every match during the season, he failed to finish inside the top ten in the club best and fairest.

=== 2013–2015: Top five best and fairest finish then inconsistency ===
The first intra-club match during the 2013 pre-season saw Melksham break his hand, which required surgery, he managed to return for the NAB Cup, playing his first match in round two. He played the first four matches of the season before he was omitted for the Anzac Day match against Collingwood in round five, he played in the VFL that weekend for Essendon's reserves side in the thirty-five-point win against North Ballarat and was named in the best players, which saw him return to the senior side for the thirty-nine-point win against Greater Western Sydney at Etihad Stadium in round six. He found himself in trouble when he was reported for rough conduct against Jarryd Roughead during the fifty-six-point loss against Hawthorn at Etihad Stadium in round eighteen, he subsequently received a reprimand from the match review panel. An incident during the final round match against Richmond saw him receive a two-match suspension for striking Daniel Jackson. He played twenty-one matches for the year with The Age journalist, Rohan Connolly stating his form had improved from the previous year; this was reflected in his fifth-place finish in the club best and fairest count. He was also rewarded with a two-year contract extension, tying him to the club until the end of the 2015 season.

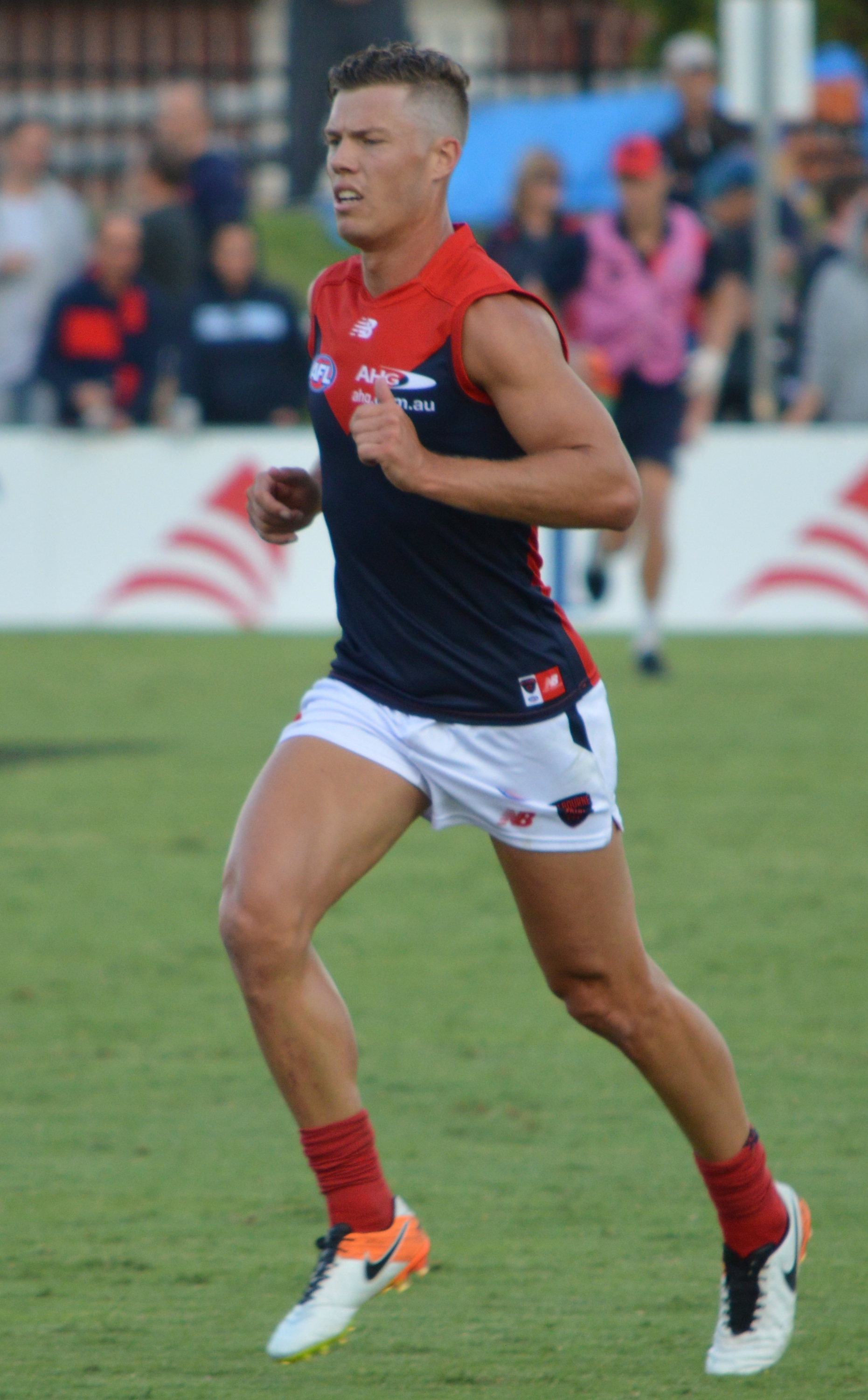
Melksham during a pre-season match in February 2017

After missing the first two matches of the 2014 season through suspension, Melksham played his first match of the year in the eighty-one point win against Carlton at the Melbourne Cricket Ground in round three. Playing a role in both the midfield and the back-line, Melksham played every match up to the sixty-four-point win against Collingwood at the Melbourne Cricket Ground in round seventeen; a drop in form throughout the year saw Melksham dropped for the round eighteen match against the Western Bulldogs at Etihad Stadium. After playing one match in the VFL, he returned for the eighteen point loss against Richmond at the Melbourne Cricket Ground in round twenty, and played the next week in the three-point win against West Coast at Etihad Stadium where he was substituted out of the match during the third quarter. He was omitted the next week for the match against Gold Coast at Etihad Stadium and missed the remainder of the year to finish with sixteen matches in total.

Melksham played the first thirteen matches of the 2015 season, including his 100th AFL match in round four in the Anzac Day clash against Collingwood at the Melbourne Cricket Ground, before missing the round fifteen match against Melbourne at the Melbourne Cricket Ground due to a hamstring injury sustained at training. He returned for the eighty-seven-point loss to the Western Bulldogs at Etihad Stadium in round eighteen, however, he was forced to miss the next week and played in the VFL, before returning for the 112-point loss against Adelaide at Etihad Stadium in round twenty, and played the remainder of the year to finish with eighteen match for the season. Although he missed four matches and had an inconsistent year, Melksham finished ninth in the club best and fairest count. Falling out of contract at the end of the year, reports emerged at the end of the season that he was considering changing clubs despite Essendon offering him a two-year contract. After 114 matches with Essendon, he announced in late September that he wanted to be traded from the club and he was officially traded to the Melbourne Football Club in October during the trade period on a four-year deal, linking him to the club until the end of the 2019 season.

=== 2016–present: Move to Melbourne and suspension ===
Citing his friendship with incoming coach, Simon Goodwin, as the key reason for his move to Melbourne, Melksham noted the opportunity for a fresh start as another reason for his move. Melksham, along with 33 other Essendon players, were found guilty of using a banned performance-enhancing substance, thymosin beta-4, as part of Essendon's sports supplements program during the 2012 season. He and his teammates were initially found not guilty in March 2015 by the AFL Anti-Doping Tribunal, however, a guilty verdict was returned in January 2016 after an appeal by the World Anti-Doping Agency. He was suspended for two years which, with backdating, ended in November 2016; as a result, he served approximately fourteen months of his suspension and missed the entire 2016 season.

After missing twelve months of football, Melbourne elected to ease Melksham back into training heading into the 2017 season, in which he did not join full training until January. With the intention to play the season on the half-back line and the wing, he played his first competitive match in Melbourne colours in the opening week JLT Community Series match against the Western Bulldogs at Whitten Oval playing as a defender. After playing all three matches in the JLT Community Series, he made his debut for Melbourne in the thirty point win against St Kilda at Etihad Stadium in round one. He played the opening six matches of the year, but struggled to make a significant impact, and he was dropped for the round seven match against Hawthorn at the Melbourne Cricket Ground. The same weekend, when Melksham was playing for Melbourne's VFL affiliate team, the Casey Demons, he was reported twice and subsequently received a one-match suspension. He was recalled to the senior side for the thirty-five-point win against Gold Coast at TIO Traeger Park in round ten. He played the remainder of the season in a new position as a defensive forward, and kicked twenty-one goals following his return, with Fox Sports Australia reporter, Brayden May, writing the new role had "breathed new life" into Melksham.

Melksham excelled in his new role as a forward in 2018, finishing with a career-high 32 goals for the season as Melbourne made its first finals series since 2006. Highlights included a five-goal, best on ground performance, against Carlton in Round 9 and four goals against West Coast in a dramatic Round 22 win which confirmed Melbourne's position in the top 8.

Despite Melbourne's drastic form slump in 2019, Melksham played consistently in the early rounds, before a foot injury in Round 8 against Gold Coast sidelined him for three months. He returned to form in 2020, playing every match of the shortened season, including captaining the side to victory against North Melbourne in Round 11, due to the absence of Max Gawn and Jack Viney. Melksham, however, struggled to have an impact in the closing rounds of the season as Melbourne missed out on the finals, finishing in ninth position.

Melksham announced his retirement from the AFL on 24 August 2026, and played his final game in Melbourne's wildcard playoff loss to Carlton the following Saturday.

== Honours & achievements ==
Team

- VFL Premiership Player: (2022) Casey Demons
- AFL minor premiership: (2021) Melbourne
- McClelland Trophy: (2021, 2023) Melbourne

Individual

- 2010 AFL Rising Star Nominee: (Round 8)

== Statistics ==
Updated to the end of round 22, 2026.

Legend
G	Goals	K	Kicks	D	Disposals	T	Tackles
B	Behinds	H	Handballs	M	Marks

Season	Team	No.	Games	Totals							Averages (per game)							Votes
Season	Team	No.	Games	G	B	K	H	D	M	T	G	B	K	H	D	M	T	Votes
2010	Essendon	17	14	6	7	120	88	208	43	34	0.4	0.5	8.6	6.3	14.9	3.1	2.4	0
2011	Essendon	17	23	6	8	240	145	385	94	78	0.3	0.3	10.4	6.3	16.7	4.1	3.4	3
2012	Essendon	17	22	14	13	215	112	327	90	50	0.6	0.6	9.8	5.1	14.9	4.1	2.3	0
2013	Essendon	17	21	16	12	246	165	411	97	58	0.8	0.6	11.7	7.9	19.6	4.6	2.8	0
2014	Essendon	17	16	8	4	125	124	249	61	38	0.5	0.3	7.8	7.8	15.6	3.8	2.4	0
2015	Essendon	17	18	7	8	171	125	296	66	56	0.4	0.4	9.5	6.9	16.4	3.7	3.1	0
2016 (Note: Melksham was unavailable to be selected for the entire 2016 season due to being one of the 34 players suspended as part of the Essendon Football Club supplements saga.)	Melbourne	18	0	—	—	—	—	—	—	—	—	—	—	—	—	—	—	0
2017	Melbourne	18	19	21	6	202	116	318	84	48	1.1	0.3	10.6	6.1	16.7	4.4	2.5	0
2018	Melbourne	18	23	32	24	243	92	335	108	44	1.4	1.0	10.6	4.0	14.6	4.7	1.9	4
2019	Melbourne	18	12	15	14	138	52	190	66	25	1.3	1.2	11.5	4.3	15.8	5.5	2.1	0
2020 (Note: The 2020 season was played with 17 home-and-away matches per team (down from 22) and 16-minute quarters with time on (down from 20-minute quarters with time on) due to the impact of the COVID-19 pandemic.)	Melbourne	18	17	15	8	110	50	160	49	23	0.9	0.5	6.5	2.9	9.4	2.9	1.4	0
2021 (Note: Statistics include two games in which Melksham was an unused medical substitute (rounds 3 and 9).)	Melbourne	18	12	8	4	58	49	107	25	18	0.7	0.3	4.8	4.1	8.9	2.1	1.5	0
2022	Melbourne	18	11	12	12	71	27	98	41	21	1.1	1.1	6.5	2.5	8.9	3.7	1.9	1
2023 (Note: 2023 statistics include three games in which Melksham was a used substitute (round 1, 2 & 3).)	Melbourne	18	13	20	11	84	19	103	50	20	1.5	0.8	6.5	1.5	7.9	3.8	1.5	2
2024	Melbourne	18	8	8	4	50	19	69	30	7	1.0	0.5	6.3	2.4	8.6	3.8	0.9	0
2025	Melbourne	18	19	33	22	143	43	186	68	31	1.7	1.2	7.5	2.3	9.8	3.6	1.6	2
2026	Melbourne	18	6	8	1	27	20	47	17	6	1.3	0.2	4.5	3.3	7.8	2.8	1.0	0
Career			254	229	158	2243	1246	3489	989	557	0.9	0.6	8.8	4.9	13.7	3.9	2.2	12
