= Ryan Bastinac =

Australian rules footballer

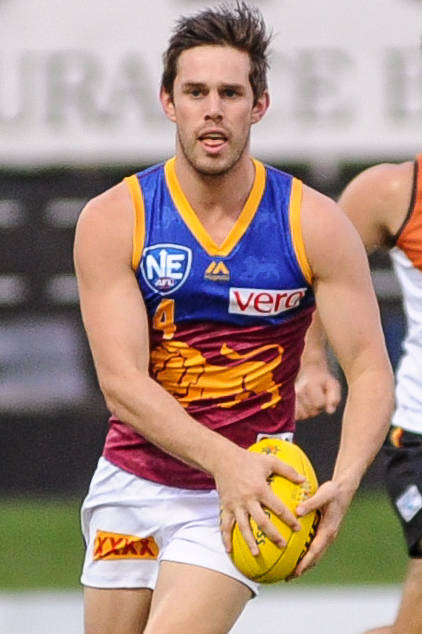
- Bastinac playing for the Brisbane Lions reserves in April 2017

Personal information
- Full name: Ryan Bastinac
- Nickname: Basti
- Born: 22 June 1991 (age 35)
- Original team: Dandenong Stingrays
- Draft: 21st overall, 2009; North Melbourne
- Height: 184 cm (6 ft 0 in)
- Weight: 81 kg (179 lb)
- Position: Midfield

Playing career^{1}
Years	Club	Games (Goals)
2010–2015	North Melbourne	121 (66)
2016–2019	Brisbane Lions	43 (27)
Total		164 (93)
- ^{1} Playing statistics correct to the end of 2019.

Career highlights
- 2010 AFL Rising Star nominee

Ryan Bastinac (born 22 June 1991) is a former Australian rules footballer who played for the North Melbourne Football Club and the Brisbane Lions in the Australian Football League (AFL).

Bastinac could play as an inside and outside midfielder and was renowned for his endurance and aerobic capacity.

== AFL career ==
Bastinac was drafted by North Melbourne with the 21st overall selection in the 2009 AFL draft from the Dandenong Stingrays. As a child he supported the Richmond Football Club.

Bastinac made his debut in round 1 of the 2010 season against Port Adelaide. He gathered 23 disposals however, despite a late surge, North Melbourne would lose the game by 14 points. He collected 24 disposals against West Coast in round 3, his efforts saw him rewarded with the round nomination for the Rising Star, and finished fifth overall in the award. He played the remainder of the season averaging almost 19 disposals, 2.5 tackles and taking 54 marks over the 22 games. He kicked seven goals over the course of the season. In round 2 of 2012, Bastinac drew the North Melbourne record for disposals in a game, with 44 disposals against Greater Western Sydney.

In October 2015, Bastinac was traded to the Brisbane Lions. After four years with the Lions, he was delisted at the conclusion of the 2019 AFL season.

Bastinac played for Aspley in the 2021 VFL Season.
