= Sam Wright (Australian footballer) =

Australian rules footballer

Personal information
- Full name: Samuel Wright
- Born: 15 July 1990 (age 36)
- Original team: Katamatite / Murray Bushrangers
- Draft: 27th overall, 2008; North Melbourne
- Height: 188 cm (6 ft 2 in)
- Weight: 82 kg (181 lb)
- Position: Utility

Playing career^{1}
Years	Club	Games (Goals)
2009–2019	North Melbourne	136 (58)

Coaching career^{3}
Years	Club	Games (W–L–D)
2024–2026	Collingwood (W)	35 (5–30–0)
- ^{1} Playing statistics correct to the end of 2019.^{3} Coaching statistics correct as of the 2026 season.

Career highlights
- 2010 AFL Rising Star nominee

Samuel Wright (born 15 July 1990) is a former Australian rules footballer and the current senior coach of Collingwood in the AFL Women's competition. Wright played 136 games for the North Melbourne Football Club in the Australian Football League (AFL), and was a welfare and development coordinator at The Australian Ballet.

== AFL career ==
Wright was drafted by North Melbourne with the 27th overall selection of the 2008 AFL draft from the Murray Bushrangers. He made his debut on 16 May 2009 against Geelong, and received a Rising Star nomination in round 21, 2010.

Wright's career was disrupted in 2016 and 2017 by a series of sesamoid bone fractures in his foot and ankle, and two ruptured ligaments, requiring five ankle surgeries. Wright turned to ballet for physical therapy, guided by Sue Mayes, the principal physiotherapist with The Australian Ballet. Wright returned on 5 May 2018 for a two-point win over Sydney, collecting 18 possessions and seven marks in his first AFL game in 701 days.

On 3 October 2018, Wright signed a contract for his eleventh season with North Melbourne.

Following another ankle injury, Wright announced his retirement on 30 July 2019. Wright joined The Australian Ballet as the Dancer Welfare & Development Coordinator.

In December 2023, Wright was appointed coach of Collingwood for the 2024 AFL Women's season.

After seasons, including a horror season in the 2026 AFL Women's season, in which they won 1 game out of 12, Wright decided to step down from the coaching role.
