= Dan Hannebery =

Australian rules footballer (born 1991)

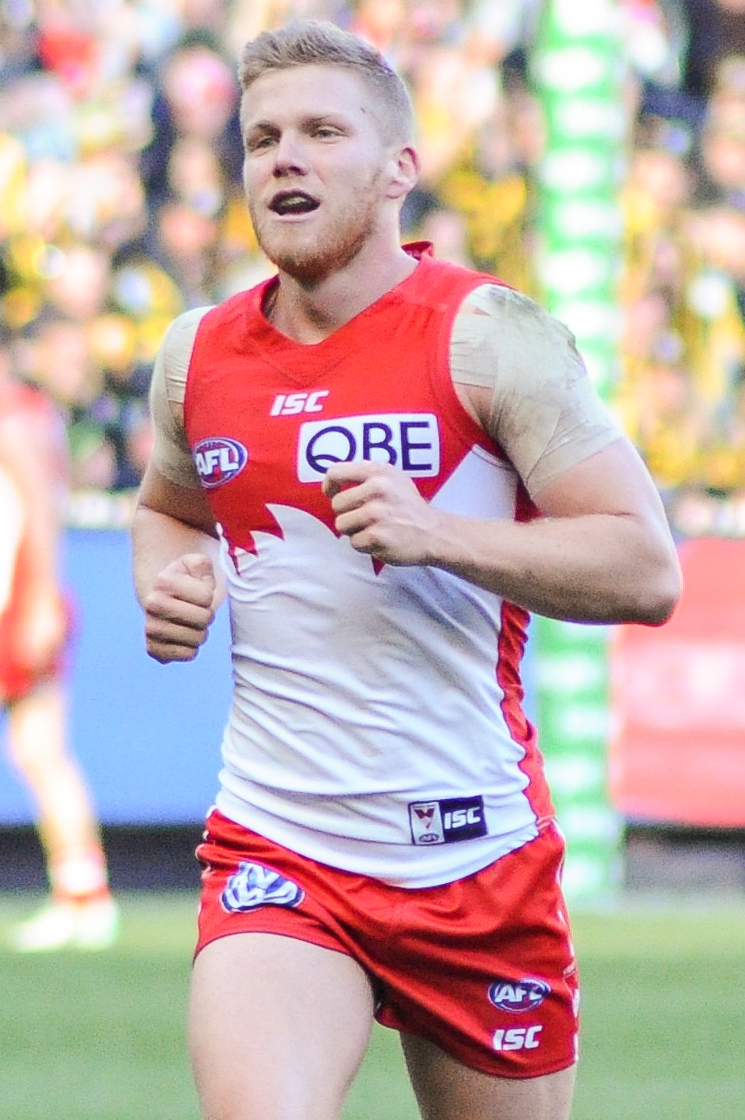
- Hannebery playing for Sydney in 2017

Personal information
- Full name: Daniel Hannebery
- Nickname: Hanners
- Born: 24 February 1991 (age 35)
- Original team: Oakleigh Chargers (TAC Cup)/Xavier College/Kew Rovers
- Draft: No. 30, 2008 national draft
- Debut: Round 16, 2009, Sydney vs. Carlton, at Etihad Stadium
- Height: 181 cm (5 ft 11 in)
- Weight: 81 kg (179 lb)
- Position: Midfielder

Playing career^{1}
Years	Club	Games (Goals)
2009–2018	Sydney	208 (95)
2019–2022	St Kilda	18 (5)
Total		226 (100)
- ^{1} Playing statistics correct to the end of 2022.

Career highlights
- AFL premiership player: 2012; AFLCA Champion Player of the Year Award: 2015; 3× All-Australian team: 2013, 2015, 2016; Ron Evans Medal: 2010; 2× 22under22 team: 2012, 2013

Daniel Hannebery (born 24 February 1991) is a former professional Australian rules footballer who played in the Australian Football League (AFL). He previously played for the Sydney Swans from 2009 to 2018 and for the St Kilda Football Club from 2019 to 2022. Hannebery won the AFL Rising Star award in his second season in 2010, and is a three-time All-Australian. He also won a premiership with Sydney in 2012 and the AFLCA Champion Player of the Year Award in 2015.

== Early life ==
Hannebery was a standout junior footballer and represented the Oakleigh Chargers in the TAC Cup, as well as playing for Vic Metro at the 2008 Under 18 National Championships. He was described as a 'bull out of a gate' type player and was known for his powerful core and ability to absorb the tackle, and also his contested ball winning ability which was his main strength. He was drafted with Pick 30 in the 2008 AFL draft. He was originally drafted as a forward pocket but became an All-Australian winger. He is the son of former Footscray player Matt Hannebery.

== AFL career ==
=== Sydney (2009–2018) ===
Hannebery was drafted by the Sydney Swans in the 2008 AFL draft, but remained in Melbourne in 2009 to complete his secondary education at Xavier College. He made his debut in round 16, 2009 against Carlton, while still attending high school.

In round 2 of the 2010 AFL season, he received a nomination for the AFL Rising Star award after he played a starring role in his side's drought-breaking win over Adelaide at AAMI Stadium. Hannebery was awarded the Ron Evans Medal as the 2010 AFL Rising Star. Hotly tipped all year to take out the coveted award, he polled the maximum 45 votes to beat number one draft pick, Tom Scully with 35 votes. Hannebery's outstanding season was further rewarded with finishing 10th in the Bob Skilton Medal and winning the club's Rising Star Award.

The 2011 season was a strong second season for Hannebery as he improved markedly to finish seventh in the Skilton Medal. Hannebery had another strong season in 2012 as the Swans went on to win the premiership. He placed 10th in the 2012 Bob Skilton Medal. In 2013 Hannebery won the first New Zealand-awarded Anzac Medal in the Anzac Day clash between Sydney and St Kilda. The game was played at Westpac Stadium in New Zealand's capital, Wellington. This was the first game ever played for premiership points outside of Australia.

Hannebery's 2015 season was arguably his best, finishing the home and away season as the AFL's leader in possessions. His best game was against Adelaide in round 18, with 40 possessions and 3 goals. He was rewarded with the AFLCA Champion Player of the Year Award, polling one vote ahead of Nat Fyfe. Hannebery became the youngest Sydney player to reach 200 games on 1 June 2018.

=== St Kilda (2019–2022) ===
At the conclusion of the 2018 season, Hannebery requested a trade back to Victoria. He was traded to St Kilda on 12 October, and immediately joined the club's leadership group. After persistent hamstring and calf issues prevented him from making his St Kilda debut until round 14 of the 2019 season, Hannebery was among his side's best in his first game for the club, a 56-point loss to the Brisbane Lions at Marvel Stadium. His best game for the year came in the round 23 loss to his former side Sydney at the SCG, when he accumulated 28 disposals to be best afield for St Kilda. In October, Hannebery broke his foot when he rolled his ankle on a step at his sister's fiancé's house in Perth, and required surgery.

Hannebery played the first five games of the 2020 season, which was impacted by the COVID-19 pandemic, and suffered a hamstring injury in round 5 against Carlton. He was initially expected to make an early return in round 7 against Adelaide, before suffering a hamstring injury in the days leading up to the game, forcing him to leave the club's Sunshine Coast hub to have the injury operated on and placing his season in doubt. Upon his return to Queensland, Hannebery declared that he would be ready to play in time for finals; he eventually made his return in the final home-and-away match against Greater Western Sydney, where he was among the best afield for St Kilda. Hannebery then played in the Saints' two finals, collecting 19 (from 67% time on ground) and then 20 disposals (from 73% time on ground).

Hannebery had a disastrous 2021 season, having a number of calf injuries on both legs. After a number of set backs, Hannebery returned to football via the VFL in early July. He finally returned to the Saints in Round 22, playing a conservative 59% game time but impressing with 18 disposals a nd eight contested possessions. In the Saints' final game of the season and win over Fremantle, Hannebery again played a limited 58% of possible game time, but was very strong with 22 disposals and 10 contested possessions. At the conclusion of the season, Hannebery and the Saints renegotiated the final year of his contract, entering 2022 on reduced salary. Of the new deal, Hannebery stated that “it has no doubt been the most frustrating two or three years of my career. It has been incredibly challenging...At St Kilda, I have taken it to the next level at different stages. After training I would try to find other avenues, whether it be yoga, pilates, movement, DNS training (otherwise known as dynamic neuromuscular stabilisation), acupuncture, whatever it is I’ve been trying to work overtime to bridge the gap or find any area I can improve to give myself a chance to get back quick. Whether it be diet or sleep ... all these different things I have been hammering away at for a while."

On August 18, 2022, three days before St Kilda's last game of the 2022 season, Hannebery announced that he would be retiring from professional football at the end of the season. St Kilda's last game of the year would so happen to be against Hannebery's old side Sydney, and he would go on to finish his professional career playing against the team he started at. In his final game, Hannebery played well, contributing 30 disposals, six tackles, four score involvements, and claimed the three Brownlow votes in a game Sydney went on to win 88–74.

== Statistics ==
Statistics are correct to the end of 2022

Legend
G	Goals	K	Kicks	D	Disposals	T	Tackles
B	Behinds	H	Handballs	M	Marks
#	Played in that season's premiership team	†	Led the league for the season

Season	Team	No.	Games	Totals							Averages (per game)							Votes
Season	Team	No.	Games	G	B	K	H	D	M	T	G	B	K	H	D	M	T	Votes
2009	Sydney	4	7	1	1	45	42	87	25	8	0.1	0.1	6.4	6.0	12.4	3.6	1.1	0
2010	Sydney	4	21	9	6	206	226	432	97	69	0.4	0.3	9.8	10.8	20.6	4.6	3.3	9
2011	Sydney	4	24	6	6	254	243	497	95	78	0.3	0.3	10.6	10.1	20.7	4.0	3.3	2
2012^{#}	Sydney	4	25	10	8	261	335	596	95	84	0.4	0.3	10.4	13.4	23.8	3.8	3.4	12
2013	Sydney	4	24	17	16	275	332	607	80	67	0.7	0.7	11.5	13.8	25.3	3.3	2.8	21
2014	Sydney	4	19	11	8	216	263	479	64	97	0.6	0.4	11.4	13.8	25.2	3.4	5.1	11
2015	Sydney	4	24	15	7	312	408	720	99	123	0.6	0.3	13.0	17.0	30.0	4.1	5.1	24
2016	Sydney	4	26	13	18	365	437	802^{†}	94	127	0.5	0.7	14.0	16.8	30.8	3.6	4.9	21
2017	Sydney	4	23	12	4	241	328	569	93	119	0.5	0.2	10.5	14.3	24.7	4.0	5.2	6
2018	Sydney	4	15	1	1	125	155	280	46	37	0.1	0.1	8.3	10.3	18.7	3.1	2.5	0
2019	St Kilda	10	5	3	2	72	53	125	22	21	0.6	0.4	14.4	10.6	25.0	4.4	4.2	1
2020 (Note: The 2020 season was played with 17 home-and-away matches per team (down from 22) and 16-minute quarters with time on (down from 20-minute quarters with time on) due to the impact of the COVID-19 pandemic.)	St Kilda	10	8	1	2	64	74	138	19	12	0.1	0.3	8.0	9.3	17.3	2.4	1.5	0
2021	St Kilda	10	2	0	0	18	22	40	4	3	0.0	0.0	9.0	11.0	20.0	2.0	1.5	0
2022	St Kilda	10	3	1	0	34	34	68	7	8	0.3	0.0	11.3	11.3	22.7	2.3	2.7	3
Career			226	100	79	2491	2952	5443	840	854	0.4	0.4	11.0	13.1	24.1	3.7	3.8	110

== Honours and achievements ==
Team

- AFL premiership player (Sydney): 2012
- 2× McClelland Trophy (Sydney): 2014, 2016

Individual

- AFLCA Champion Player of the Year Award: 2015
- 3× All-Australian team: 2013, 2015, 2016
- Ron Evans Medal: 2010
- 2× Brett Kirk Medal: 2015 (game 1)
- 2× 22under22 team: 2012, 2013
