= Jarrad Grant =

Australian rules footballer (born 1989)

Personal information
- Full name: Jarrad Grant
- Nicknames: Microphone Head, Spindleshanks
- Born: 6 July 1989 (age 37)
- Original team: Dandenong Stingrays (TAC Cup)
- Draft: No. 5, 2007 national draft
- Height: 193 cm (6 ft 4 in)
- Weight: 85 kg (187 lb)
- Position: Forward

Playing career^{1}
Years	Club	Games (Goals)
2009–2015	Western Bulldogs	81 (83)
2016–2017	Gold Coast	14 (11)
Total		95 (94)
- ^{1} Playing statistics correct to the end of 2017.

Career highlights
- 2010 AFL Rising Star nominee

Jarrad Grant (born 6 July 1989) is a former professional Australian rules footballer who played for the Western Bulldogs and Gold Coast Football Club in the Australian Football League (AFL).

Recruited from his TAC Cup team, the Dandenong Stingrays, Grant is an AIS/AFL Academy graduate who originally played for the Frankston Bombers.

Grant nominated for the 2007 AFL National draft. He was selected by the Bulldogs with their first selection (#5 overall) in the hope that he would add height and marking power to the Bulldogs small forward line.

On 22 February, Grant (who was named as an emergency for the NAB Cup game later that night against the Essendon Football Club) was stung by a stingray. He was later released from hospital but missed the game.

Grant made his AFL debut in round 5 of 2009, but only played the one game, in which he only had one kick, for the year. He returned to the Bulldogs side in round 5 of 2010 and has maintained his position in the side, showing promising signs of becoming a long-term forward-line player including a personal best performance of 6 Goals on Michael Hurley vs Essendon in round 22, 2010.

Grant was delisted in October 2015. He was recruited by Gold Coast in November 2015, before being delisted from the Suns in September 2017.
