= 2012 Essendon Football Club season =

Essendon Football Club
2012 season
- President: David Evans
- Coach: James Hird (2nd season)
- Captains: Jobe Watson (3rd season)
- Home ground: Etihad Stadium
- AFL season: 11th
- Best and Fairest: Jobe Watson
- Leading goalkicker: Stewart Crameri (32)
- Highest home attendance: 80,900 vs. Richmond (Round 8)
- Lowest home attendance: 33,118 vs. Port Adelaide (Round 2)
- Average home attendance: 47,607
- Club membership: 47,708 (▼2,567 / -5.38%)

The 2012 Essendon Football Club season is the club's 114th season in the Australian Football League (AFL).

After a promising start to the season Essendon found themselves second on the ladder with a record of 8 wins and 1 loss (which was by a single point). The season then took an unexpected turn which saw Essendon lose 10 out of the last 13 games and miss the finals. They became the first club to have an 8–1 record and miss finals since Melbourne in the 1971 season.

Prior to the final round vice-captain Mark McVeigh announced his retirement from football after 14 season and 232 games at the club. After the Home and Away season completed Essendon captain Jobe Watson was awarded the Brownlow Medal. The highest individual accolade in the AFL. This was later handed back following the drug scandal.

The season became notorious for the illegal supplements program that was operated by the club prior to and into the 2012 season. After a three-year investigation, thirty-four players on the 2012 squad were suspected to have been administered the banned peptide Thymosin beta-4 and were suspended for the 2016 season.

== Squad ==
Essendon Football Club
Senior list		Rookie List	Coaching staff
2 Ricky Dyson; 3 Scott Gumbleton; 4 Jobe Watson (c); 5 Brent Stanton; 6 Angus Monfries; 7 Leroy Jetta; 8 Jason Winderlich; 9 Brent Prismall; 10 Mark McVeigh (vc) (vet); 11 David Zaharakis; 12 Stewart Crameri; 14 Sam Lonergan; 15 Courtenay Dempsey; 16 Tayte Pears; 17 Jake Melksham; 18 Michael Hurley; 19 David Hille (vc) (vet); 20 Henry Slattery; 21 Dyson Heppell; 22 Jake Carlisle	23 David Myers; 24 Alex Browne; 25 Ariel Steinberg; 26 Cale Hooker; 27 Luke Davis; 28 Elliott Kavanagh; 29 Alwyn Davey; 30 Paddy Ryder; 31 Dustin Fletcher (vet); 32 Travis Colyer; 33 Jackson Merrett; 34 Kyle Hardingham; 35 Nick O'Brien; 37 Kyle Reimers; 38 Michael Ross; 39 Heath Hocking; 40 Ben Howlett; 42 Nathan Lovett-Murray; 43 Michael Hibberd; 44 Tom Bellchambers	13 Anthony Long; 36 Lauchlan Dalgleish; 41 Brendan Lee; 45 Hal Hunter; 46 Mark Baguley; 47 Cory Dell'Olio	Head coach: James Hird; Assistant coaches: Mark Thompson (senior assistant); Sean Wellman (defensive structure); Simon Goodwin (midfield structure); Matthew Egan (forward structure); James Byrne (development); Rick Ladson (development); Hayden Skipworth (VFL coach); Legend: (c) Captain(s); (vc) Vice-captain(s); (vet) Veterans list; Updated: 20 October 2012; Source(s): Playing list, Coaching staff

=== Trades ===
In

Player	Traded From	Traded To	Traded For
None

Out

Player	Traded From	Traded To	Traded For
(Victoria (state)) Josh Jenkins; Draft pick No. 41	Essendon	Adelaide	Draft pick No. 31

=== Drafts ===
National Draft

Round	Pick	Name	From	League
1	19	(Victoria (state)) Elliott Kavanagh	Western Jets	TAC Cup
2	31	(Victoria (state)) Jackson Merrett	Geelong Falcons	TAC Cup
3	59	(Victoria (state)) Nick O'Brien	North Ballarat Rebels	TAC Cup
4	75	(Victoria (state)) Stewart Crameri	Rookie Promotion	

Rookie Draft

Round	Pick	Name	From	League
1	11	(Victoria (state)) Lauchlan Dalgleish	North Ballarat Rebels	TAC Cup
2	29	(Western Australia) Cory Dell'Olio	South Fremantle	WAFL
3	47	(Victoria (state)) Mark Baguley	Frankston	VFL
4	46	(Victoria (state)) Hal Hunter	Calder Cannons	TAC Cup
5	78	(Western Australia) Brendan Lee	East Perth	WAFL
6	85	(Victoria (state)) Anthony Long	Essendon	AFL

Pre-Season Draft

Round	Pick	Name	From	League
No Picks

=== Delisted ===
Seasons^{[s]}	Player
4	Darcy Daniher
4	Jay Neagle
2	Mark Williams
3	Michael Quinn
3	Tyson Slattery
2	Taite Silverlock
1	James Webster

= Retired

== Guernsey ==
=== Standard ===
Home	Away

=== Special Versions ===
Anzac		Dreamtime at the 'G		Clash for Cancer		Heritage		Heritage	
Round(s) Worn	5	Round(s) Worn	8	Round(s) Worn	13	Round(s) Worn	15	Round(s) Worn	16, 22

==== Heritage Guernsey ====
On 2 July Essendon unveiled their Heritage Guernsey. It feature all the names of past premiership players in the background along with the name and signature of club legend John Colman on the breast. Under the signature include the traditional Essendon Football Club motto 'suaviter in modo, fortiter in re' which dates back to the 1870s and translates as 'gentle in manner, resolute in deed.' The most notable change to the guernsey was the removal of the black background to comply with AFL rules requiring each club to provide a clash guernsey. The new Heritage guernsey made its debut during the Round 15 game between St Kilda and Essendon. This marked the end of a 114-year-long tradition as the first time the Essendon Football Club would play an AFL/VFL game without wearing its famous black and red stripe guernsey.

== Results ==
=== Pre-season (NAB Cup) ===
==== Round 1 ====
The three teams in each pool play each other in games of two 20-minute halves, with all three games being played over a three-hour period at the one venue.

	Round 1
Sunday, 18 February 4:45 pm	West Coast 0.9.3 (57)	def.	Essendon 0.5.6 (36)	Patersons Stadium (crowd: 27,581)	Report
Sunday, 18 February 5:50 pm	Fremantle 1.7.5 (56)	def.	Essendon 0.3.2 (20)	Patersons Stadium (crowd: 27,534)	Report

==== Round 2 ====
	Round 2
Saturday, 3 March 7:00 pm (cancelled)	Essendon	def. by	St Kilda	Wangaratta Showgrounds
The match between Essendon and St Kilda was cancelled, because heavy rain prevented flights chartered by the Essendon Football Club from landing in Wangaratta. Initially the match was reflected as a draw with no score on the NAB Cup Ladder, but later St Kilda was awarded the four points.

==== Round 3 ====
	Round 3
Friday, 9 March 6:10 pm	Essendon 1.14.12 (105)	def.	Sydney 1.14.10 (103)	Etihad Stadium (crowd: 12,000)	Report

==== Round 4 - NAB Challenge Round ====
	Round 4
Saturday, 17 March 3:30 pm	Essendon 16.16 (112)	def.	Brisbane Lions 8.8 (56)	Visy Park (crowd: 3,500)	Report
This game was played under regular season rules.

=== Home and Away season ===
==== Round 1 ====
Round 1
Saturday, 31 March 7:40 pm	North Melbourne	def. by	Essendon	Etihad Stadium (crowd: 45,699)	Report
4.3 (27); 8.5 (53); 10.10 (70); 15.12 (102)	Q1; Q2; Q3; Final	3.2 (20); 9.8 (62); 13.14 (92); 14.20 (104)	Umpires: Stevic, Armstrong, Bannister; Television broadcast: Fox Sports
Harvey 3 Adams, Edwards, Petrie, Thomas 2 Harper, MacMillan, McIntosh, Wells 1	Goals	2 Hurley, Lovett-Murray, Melksham, Stanton; 1 Heppell, Hille, Jetta, McVeigh, Ryder, Watson
Wells, Swallow, Petrie, Firrito, Adams, Harper, Thomas	Best	Stanton, Watson, Heppell, Myers, Hille, Hibberd, Zaharakis
Tarrant (Hamstring)	Injuries	Hocking (Concussion), Hardingham (Shoulder)
Wright (Charging)	Reports	Nil
Former Essendon player Jordan Bannister made his senior AFL debut as a field umpire in this match. Bannister played for Essendon from 2001–2003, and later played for Carlton.

Score Worm

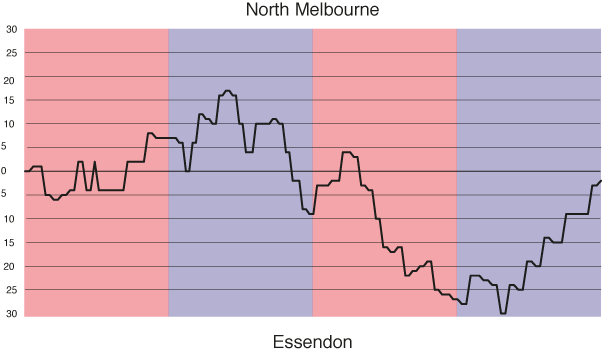

Brownlow Votes
3 Brent Stanton (Essendon); 2 Daniel Wells (North Melbourne); 1 Jobe Watson (Essendon)

Game Milestone
50 Cale Hooker

==== Round 2 ====
Round 2
Saturday, 7 April 1:45 pm	Essendon	def.	Port Adelaide	Etihad Stadium (crowd: 33,118)	Report
5.2 (32); 10.6 (66); 11.13 (79); 16.15 (111)	Q1; Q2; Q3; Final	5.2 (32); 7.3 (45); 12.5 (77); 13.8 (86)	Umpires: Donlon, Ritchie, Armstrong; Television broadcast: Channel 7
Jetta 4 Crameri 3 Stanton 2 Carlisle, Dempsey, Hille, Howlett, Hurley, Monfries, Zaharakis 1	Goals	4 Schulz; 3 Westhoff; 1 Ebert, McCarthy, Redden, P.Stewart, Thomas, Wingard
Stanton, Jetta, Ryder, Watson, Dempsey, Monfries, Hardingham	Best	Boak, Cornes, Westhoff, Schulz, McCarthy, Cassisi
Hille (Calf), Myers (Hamstring), Lovett-Murray (Hamstring)	Injuries	Wingard (Concussion)

Score Worm

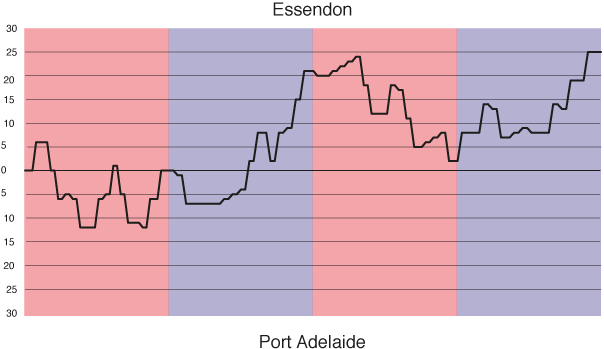

Brownlow Votes
3 Jobe Watson (Essendon); 2 Domenic Cassisi (Port Adelaide); 1 Dustin Fletcher (Essendon)

==== Round 3 ====
Round 3
Saturday, 14 April 7:40 pm	Gold Coast	def. by	Essendon	Metricon Stadium (crowd: 17,069)	Report
2.3 (15); 7.5 (47); 12.7 (79); 13.10 (88)	Q1; Q2; Q3; Final	5.6 (36); 7.10 (52); 10.12 (72); 15.15 (105)	Umpires: Ritchie, Stewart, Grun; Television broadcast: Channel 7
Ablett, Bock, Hall 2 Brennan, Caddy, Harbrow, Matera, Rischitelli, Russell, Shaw 1	Goals	4 Crameri; 2 Hurley, Jetta, Ryder, Watson; 1 Bellchambers, Davey, Reimers
Ablett, Harbrow, Hunt, Tape, Bock, Swallow	Best	Watson, Crameri, Hurley, Monfries, Howlett, Ryder
Nil	Injuries	Dempsey (Hamstring)

Score Worm

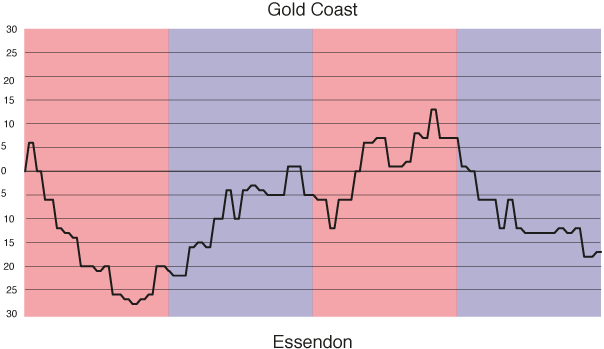

Brownlow Votes
3 Gary Ablett, Jr. (Gold Coast); 2 Jobe Watson (Essendon); 1 Stewart Crameri (Essendon)

Game Milestone
350 Dustin Fletcher; 50 Michael Hurley; 50 Tayte Pears

==== Round 4 ====
Round 4
Saturday, 21 April 1:45 pm	Carlton	def. by	Essendon	MCG (crowd: 73,172)	Report
4.4 (28); 4.7 (32); 5.12 (42); 11.13 (79)	Q1; Q2; Q3; Final	3.6 (24); 8.11 (59); 12.17 (89); 15.19 (109)	Umpires: Margetts, Rosebury, Leppard; Television broadcast: Channel 7
Betts 4 Robinson, Garlett, Murphy, McLean, Gibbs, Judd, Hampson 1	Goals	5 Crameri; 3 Davey; 1 Melksham, Stanton, Ryder, Zaharakis, Hurley, Fletcher, Monfries
Simpson, Murphy, Judd, Scotland, Henderson, Waite	Best	Watson, Stanton, Crameri, Hardingham, Ryder, Davey, Heppell, Hibberd, Fletcher
Carrazzo (Shoulder), Laidler (Knee), Yarran (Toe)	Injuries	Hurley (Hamstring)
The match between Carlton and Essendon was the 2,500th senior VFL/AFL match hosted by the Melbourne Cricket Ground.

Score Worm

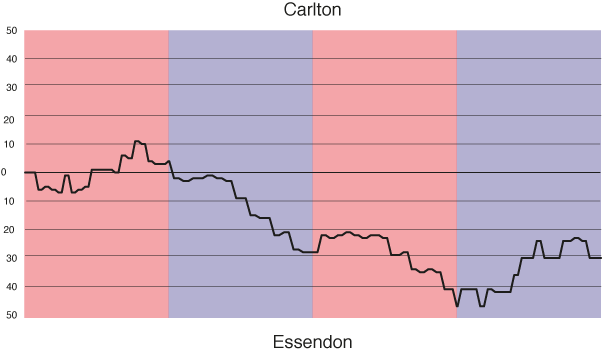

Brownlow Votes
3 Brent Stanton (Essendon); 2 Jobe Watson (Essendon); 1 Stewart Crameri (Essendon)

Game Milestone
Debut Cory Dell'Olio

==== Round 5 ====
Round 5
Wednesday, 25 April 2:40 pm	Collingwood	def.	Essendon	MCG (crowd: 86,932)	Report
2.4 (16); 5.6 (36); 9.8 (62); 11.14 (80)	Q1; Q2; Q3; Final	1.3 (9); 3.6 (24); 7.8 (50); 11.13 (79)	Umpires: Donlon, Stevic, Meredith; Television broadcast: Channel 7
Cloke, Swan 3 Blair 2 Sidebottom, Jolly, Beams 1	Goals	3 Davey; 2 Zaharakis, Monfries; 1 Hocking, Howlett, Lonergan, Dell'Olio, Stanton
Swan, Clarke, Pendlebury, Beams, Wellingham, Toovey	Best	Zaharakis, Heppell, Howlett, Dyson, Lonergan
Nil	Injuries	Hibberd (Hamstring)

Score Worm

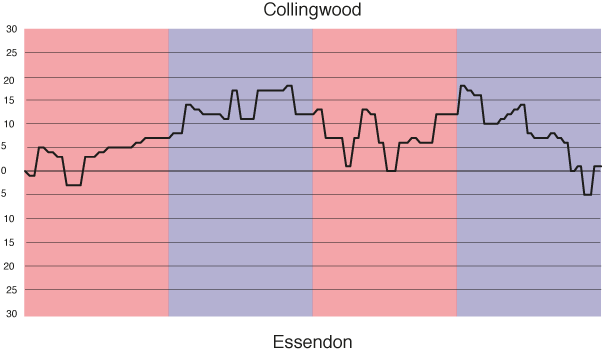

Brownlow Votes
3 Dane Swan (Collingwood); 2 Scott Pendlebury (Collingwood); 1 Dyson Heppell (Essendon)

Anzac Medal
Dane Swan

==== Round 6 ====
Round 6
Saturday, 5 May 1:40 pm	Essendon	def.	Brisbane Lions	Etihad Stadium (crowd: 36,361)	Report
8.3 (51); 12.9 (81); 16.12 (108); 19.15 (129)	Q1; Q2; Q3; Final	4.1 (25); 7.4 (46); 8.4 (52); 9.8 (62)	Umpires: Rosebury, Fila, Grun; Television broadcast: Fox Sports
Crameri 4 Jetta, Davey 3 Lonergan, Monfries 2 Melksham, Dyson, Lovett-Murray, Dempsey, Watson 1	Goals	2 Brown, Polec, Crisp; 1 Hudson, McGrath, Cornelius
Stanton, Watson, Bellchambers, Lonergan, Heppell, Hocking, Fletcher	Best	Rich, Brown, Redden, McGrath, Maguire
Crameri (Knee)	Injuries	McGrath (Adductor)

Score Worm

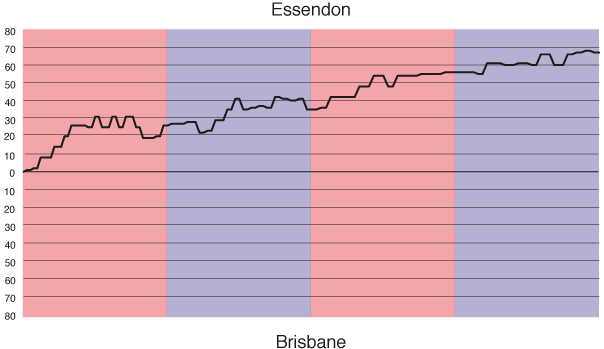

Brownlow Votes
3 Jobe Watson (Essendon); 2 Brent Stanton (Essendon); 1 Dyson Heppell (Essendon)

==== Round 7 ====
Round 7
Saturday, 12 May 7:40 pm	Essendon	def.	West Coast	Etihad Stadium (crowd: 43,260)	Report
1.6 (12); 5.10 (40); 12.14 (86); 16.17 (113)	Q1; Q2; Q3; Final	1.3 (9); 3.5 (23); 3.7 (25); 7.10 (52)	Umpires: Stewart, Fila, Meredith; Television broadcast: Channel 7
Crameri, Davey 3 Jetta, Ryder, Stanton 2 Bellchambers, Dyson, Lovett-Murray, Melksham 1	Goals	2 Waters; 1 Brennan, Darling, Hill, Kerr, McGinnity
Stanton, Watson, Zaharakis, Hooker, Melksham, Crameri, Fletcher	Best	Cox, Kerr, Gaff, Shuey, McGinnity
Nil	Injuries	Priddis (Concussion)

Brownlow Votes
3 Brent Stanton (Essendon); 2 Jobe Watson (Essendon); 1 Paddy Ryder (Essendon)

==== Round 8 ====
Round 8
Saturday, 19 May 7:45 pm	Essendon	def.	Richmond	MCG (crowd: 80,900)	Report
6.2 (38); 12.7 (79); 16.9 (105); 19.14 (128)	Q1; Q2; Q3; Final	4.2 (26); 6.8 (44); 11.16 (82); 15.19 (109)	Umpires: Rosebury, Stewart, Bannister; Television broadcast: Channel 7
Ryder 4 Stanton, Monfries 3 Watson, Jetta, Davey 2 Crameri, Howlett, Lovett-Murray 1	Goals	3 Cotchin, Edwards; 2 Grigg, Martin; 1 Deledio, Jackson, Miller, Nahas, Riewoldt
Watson, Stanton, Crameri, Ryder, Jetta, Bellchambers, Heppell, Zaharakis	Best	Deledio, Cotchin, Grigg, Foley, Maric, Tuck, Jackson
Fletcher (Groin), Hardingham (Calf)	Injuries	Grimes (Hamstring)

Brownlow Votes
3 Brett Deledio (Richmond); 2 Brent Stanton (Essendon); 1 Jobe Watson (Essendon)

==== Round 9 ====
Round 9
Saturday, 26 May 7:40 pm	Greater Western Sydney	def. by	Essendon	Skoda Stadium (crowd: 11,887)	Report
0.5 (5); 2.9 (21); 4.11 (35); 7.11 (53)	Q1; Q2; Q3; Final	3.1 (19); 8.1 (49); 13.8 (86); 18.11 (119)	Umpires: McBurney, Ryan, Hosking; Television broadcast: Channel 7
Cameron 3 Shiel, Treloar, Giles, McDonald 1	Goals	3 Crameri, Davey, Bellchambers; 2 Ryder, Monfries; 1 Zaharakis, Watson, Melksham, Hurley, Colyer
Treloar, Tyson, Kennedy, Cameron, Power, Shiel	Best	Dyson, Crameri, Lovett-Murray, Dempsey, Zaharakis, Davey
The match between Greater Western Sydney and Essendon will be the first AFL match played at Skoda Stadium, the new primary home ground for Greater Western Sydney.; This is the first game former Essendon Coaching legend Kevin Sheedy will coach against his old club.

Brownlow Votes
3 Jobe Watson (Essendon); 2 Tom Bellchambers (Essendon); 1 Brent Stanton (Essendon)

==== Round 10 ====
Round 10
Saturday, 2 June 7:40 pm	Essendon	def. by	Melbourne	MCG (crowd: 42,987)	Report
1.5 (11); 2.9 (21); 5.13 (43); 6.16 (52)	Q1; Q2; Q3; Final	1.2 (8); 4.3 (27); 5.5 (35); 8.10 (58)	Umpires: McBurney, Jennings, Foot; Television broadcast: Channel 7
Watson 2 Davey, Melksham, Hocking, Colyer 1	Goals	2 Garland; 1 Howe, Morton, Moloney, Jones, Clark, Sylvia
Watson, Dempsey, Stanton, Howlett, Zaharakis	Best	Watts, Jones, Howe, Moloney, Rivers, Grimes, Nicholson

Brownlow Votes
3 Jack Watts (Melbourne); 2 Jobe Watson (Essendon); 1 Daniel Nicholson (Melbourne)

==== Round 11 ====
Round 11
Saturday, 9 June 7:40 pm	Essendon	def. by	Sydney	Etihad Stadium (crowd: 42,785)	Report
1.5 (11); 1.11 (17); 2.15 (27); 11.16 (82)	Q1; Q2; Q3; Final	5.3 (33); 8.6 (54); 11.8 (74); 13.8 (86)	Umpires: Margetts, Meredith, McInerney; Television broadcast: Channel 7
Davey 3 Watson 2 Hocking, Howlett, Jetta, Lovett-Murray, Myers, Stanton 1	Goals	3 Jetta; 2 Jack, Reid; 1 Bolton, Everitt, McVeigh, Mumford, Roberts-Thomson, Shaw
Watson, Davey, Dyson, Howlett, Heppell, Hooker	Best	Jetta, Bolton, Armstrong, Bird, Kennedy, Richards, McVeigh
Nil	Injuries	Hannebery (Concussion)

Brownlow Votes
3 Jude Bolton (Sydney); 2 Lewis Jetta (Sydney); 1 Jobe Watson (Essendon)

==== Round 12 ====
Bye

==== Round 13 ====
Round 13
Saturday, 23 June 5:40 pm	Fremantle	def. by	Essendon	Patersons Stadium (crowd: 34,567)	Report
6.1 (37); 8.2 (50); 14.4 (88); 14.5 (89)	Q1; Q2; Q3; Final	5.2 (32); 10.4 (64); 13.5 (83); 17.11 (113)	Umpires: Schmitt, Meredith, Bannister; Television broadcast: Channel 7
Mayne 4 Pavlich 3 Clarke, Broughton 2 Barlow, Griffin, de Boer 1	Goals	6 Hurley; 2 Monfries, Dell'Olio, Crameri; 1 Heppell, Ryder, Hille, Melksham, Watson
Pavlich, Barlow, Mayne, Ibbotson, Clarke, de Boer, Lower	Best	Hurley, Watson, Myers, Howlett, Ryder, Crameri, Carlisle

Brownlow Votes
3 Jobe Watson (Essendon); 2 Michael Hurley (Essendon); 1 Matthew Pavlich (Fremantle)

Game Milestone
50 Ben Howlett

==== Round 14 ====
Round 14
Saturday, 30 June 7:40 pm	Essendon	def.	Western Bulldogs	Etihad Stadium (crowd: 40,824)	Report
7.5 (47); 12.7 (79); 15.10 (100); 21.14 (140)	Q1; Q2; Q3; Final	1.2 (8); 3.5 (23); 6.7 (43); 8.8 (56)	Umpires: Margetts, Leppard, Findlay; Television broadcast: Channel 7
Hurley 5 Reimers 3 Watson 3 Crameri, Ryder, Dell'Olio, Melksham 2 Hocking, Dempsey 1	Goals	3 Minson; 2 Liberatore; 1 Campbell, Smith, Boyd
Hurley, Watson, Dempsey, Stanton, Hibberd, Hocking, Reimers	Best	Minson, Liberatore, Boyd, Picken, Dahlhaus, Smith
Nil	Injuries	Murphy (Left Hamstring), Griffen (Calf)

Brownlow Votes
3 Jobe Watson (Essendon); 2 Michael Hurley (Essendon); 1 Heath Hocking (Essendon)

Game Milestone
50 Jake Melksham

==== Round 15 ====
Round 15
Saturday, 7 July 7:40 pm	St Kilda	def.	Essendon	Etihad Stadium (crowd: 45,838)	Report
4.3 (27); 9.5 (59); 15.6 (96); 21.7 (133)	Q1; Q2; Q3; Final	3.5 (23); 5.6 (36); 7.8 (50); 8.14 (62)	Umpires: Stevic, Meredith, Mitchell; Television broadcast: Channel 7
Milne 5 Riewoldt 4 Koschitzke, Siposs, Wilkes, Saad, Schneider 2 Gilbert, Gram 1	Goals	2 Hille, Melksham; 1 Carlisle, Hurley, Reimers, Davey
Milne, Dal Santo, Hayes, Riewoldt, Siposs, McEvoy, Simpkin	Best	Dempsey, Heppell, Watson, Melksham, Lonergan
Nil	Injuries	Hurley (Hamstring), Reimers (Concussion)
Koschitzke (Rough Conduct)	Reports	Nil

Brownlow Votes
3 Nick Riewoldt (St Kilda); 2 Nick Dal Santo (St Kilda); 1 Stephen Milne (St Kilda)

==== Round 16 ====
Round 16
Saturday, 14 July 1:40 pm	Port Adelaide	def. by	Essendon	AAMI Stadium (crowd: 17, 344)	Report
4.3 (27); 8.6 (54); 11.9 (76); 11.13 (79)	Q1; Q2; Q3; Final	4.2 (26); 8.4 (52); 13. 8 (86); 19.13 (127)	Umpires: Farmer, Ritchie, Fila; Television broadcast: Fox Sports
Westhoff, Ebert 3 D Stewart 2 McCarthy, P Stewart, Thomas 1	Goals	3 Gumbleton, Jetta; 2 Dell'Olio, Bellchambers, Hille; 1 Davey, Dyson, Melksham, Reimers, Howlett, Myers, Watson
Brad Ebert, Brett Ebert, Moore, Broadbent, Boak, Westhoff	Best	Bellchambers, Howlett, Jetta, Gumbleton, Heppell, Watson
Nil	Injuries	Michael Hibberd (Quad)

Brownlow Votes
3 Leroy Jetta (Essendon); 2 Brett Ebert (Port Adelaide); 1 Dyson Heppell (Essendon)

Game Milestone
Debut Mark Baguley

==== Round 17 ====
Round 17
Friday, 20 July 7:50 pm	Geelong	def.	Essendon	Etihad Stadium (crowd: 50,066)	Report
4.5 (29); 9.7 (61); 15.11 (101); 20.14 (134)	Q1; Q2; Q3; Final	2.1 (13); 5.4 (34); 8.5 (53); 10.7 (67)	Umpires: Rosebury, Nicholls, Hay; Television broadcast: Channel 7
Hawkins 5 Smedts 3 Johnson, Murdoch, Taylor, Chapman 2 Duncan, Mackie, Motlop, Walker 1	Goals	3 Bellchambers; 1 Crameri, Davey, Dell'Ollio, Gumbleton, Jetta, Monfries, Myers
Duncan, Johnson, Smedts, Selwood, Mackie, Hawkins, Corey, Kelly	Best	Myers, Bellchambers, Stanton, Watson, Heppell
Steve Johnson (Right Groin)	Injuries	Nil

Brownlow Votes
3 Andrew Mackie (Geelong); 2 Mitch Duncan (Geelong); 1 Steve Johnson (Geelong)

==== Round 18 ====
Round 18
Friday, 27 July 7:50 pm	Essendon	def. by	Hawthorn	Etihad Stadium (crowd: 44,899)	Report
1.4 (10); 3.7 (25); 9.11 (65); 12.14 (86)	Q1; Q2; Q3; Final	8.5 (53); 14.9 (93); 20.15 (135); 27.18 (180)	Umpires: Meredith, Findlay, Jeffery; Television broadcast: Channel 7
Gumbleton 4 Hille 2 Dell'Ollio, Howlett, Jetta, Lovett-Murray, Monfries, Winderlich 1	Goals	5 Hodge; 4 Suckling; 3 Gunston, Roughead; 2 Young, Breust, Rioli, Smith; 1 Lewis, Puopolo, Shiels, Whitecross
Watson, Gumbleton, Howlett, Heppell, Carlisle	Best	Rioli, Hodge, Suckling, Gunston, Mitchell, Whitecross, Sewell

Brownlow Votes
3 Cyril Rioli (Hawthorn); 2 Sam Mitchell (Hawthorn); 1 Matt Suckling (Hawthorn)

Game Milestone
Debut Elliott Kavanagh

==== Round 19 ====
Round 19
Sunday, 5 August 4:10 pm	Adelaide	def.	Essendon	AAMI Stadium (crowd: 40,030)	Report
4.2 (26); 6.3 (39); 13.7 (85); 16.8 (104)	Q1; Q2; Q3; Final	5.4 (34); 9.7 (61); 12.7 (79); 15.10 (100)	Umpires: Donlon, Kamolins, Hay; Television broadcast: Fox Sports
Walker 4 Dangerfield 3 Johncock, Jenkins 2 Jacobs, Sloane, Porplyzia, Riley, van Berlo 1	Goals	4 Winderlich; 2 Browne, Gumbleton; 1 Colyer, Dempsey, Davey, Hurley, Jetta, Lonergan, Watson
Dangerfield, Thompson, Sloane, Talia, Douglas, Walker	Best	Watson, Dempsey, Lovett-Murray, Browne, Carlisle, Heppell
Porplyzia (Shoulder)	Injuries	Howlett (Hamstring), Winderlich (Hamstring)

Brownlow Votes
3 Jobe Watson (Essendon); 2 Patrick Dangerfield (Adelaide); 1 Rory Sloane (Adelaide)

Game Milestone
150 Jobe Watson; 100 Jason Winderlich

==== Round 20 ====
Round 20
Sunday, 12 August 4:40 pm	Essendon	def. by	North Melbourne	Etihad Stadium (crowd: 42,674)	Report
5.2 (32); 8.6 (54); 9.10(64); 11.10 (76)	Q1; Q2; Q3; Final	6.2 (38); 8.4 (52); 11.7 (73); 15.10 (100)	Umpires: Donlon, Meredith, McInerney; Television broadcast: Fox Sports
Davey, Hurley 3 Crameri, Lovett-Murray, Lonergan, Melksham, Watson 1	Goals	3 Harvey, Hansen, Tarrant; 2 Garlett, Gibson; 1 Wells, Wright
Watson, Fletcher, Bellchambers, Colyer, Davey, Hurley	Best	Harvey, Wright, McMahon, Swallow, Grima, Gibson, Goldstein, Anthony
Nil	Injuries	Leigh Adams (Left Shoulder), Daniel Wells (Calf), Nathan Grima (Hamstring Tendonitis)

Brownlow Votes
3 Sam Wright (North Melbourne); 2 Tom Bellchambers (Essendon); 1 Jobe Watson (Essendon)

==== Round 21 ====
Round 21
Saturday, 18 August 1:45 pm	Essendon	def. by	Carlton	MCG (crowd: 59,381)	Report
2.5 (17); 6.6 (42); 7.8 (50); 8.12 (60)	Q1; Q2; Q3; Final	5.3 (33); 15.4 (94); 20.9 (129); 25.12 (156)	Umpires: McBurney, Farmer, Schmitt; Television broadcast: Channel 7
Crameri, Ryder 2 Watson, Lonergan, Stanton, Hurley 1	Goals	5 Waite; 3 McLean, Simpson, Walker, Garlett, Casboult; 2 Betts, Murphy
Watson, Browne, Hooker	Best	Murphy, Gibbs, McLean, Waite, Simpson, Judd, Betts, Casboult
Fletcher (Hip Flexor), Carlisle (Ankle)	Injuries	Nil

Brownlow Votes
3 Marc Murphy (Carlton); 2 Jarrad Waite (Carlton); 1 Kade Simpson (Carlton)

==== Round 22 ====
Round 22
Friday, 24 August 7:50 pm	Richmond	def.	Essendon	MCG (crowd: 47,590)	Report
5.5 (35); 8.11 (59); 12.16 (88); 13.24 (102)	Q1; Q2; Q3; Final	3.2 (20); 4.6 (30); 7.9 (51); 8.9 (57)	Umpires: Nicholls, McInerney, Mollison; Television broadcast: Channel 7
Riewoldt 3 Edwards, McGuane 2 Astbury, Deledio, Grigg, Martin, Nahas, O'Hanlon 1	Goals	3 Monfries; 1 Browne, Gumbleton, Hurley, Jetta, O'Brien
Tuck, Cotchin, Deledio, Houli, Jackson, Edwards, Riewoldt, O'Hanlon	Best	Heppell, Monfries, Hibberd, Crameri
White (Hamstring)	Injuries	Davey (Hamstring), Crameri (Shoulder)

Brownlow Votes
3 Trent Cotchin (Richmond); 2 Shane Tuck (Richmond); 1 Brett Deledio (Richmond)

Game Milestone
Debut Nick O'Brien

==== Round 23 ====
Round 23
Saturday, 1 September 7:40 pm	Essendon	def. by	Collingwood	MCG (crowd: 56,491)	Report
4.3 (27); 7.3 (45); 9.7 (61); 10.12 (72)	Q1; Q2; Q3; Final	5.5 (35); 7.11 (53); 10.17 (77); 14.20 (104)	Umpires: Donlon, McBurney, Jennings; Television broadcast: Channel 7
O'Brien, Zaharakis 2 Crameri, Monfries, Hurley, Myers, Watson, Heppell 1	Goals	5 Cloke; 2 Fasolo; 1 Beams, Goldsack, Paine, Swan, Krakouer, Shaw, O'Brien
Watson, Stanton, Zaharakis, Heppell, Hille, Hurley	Best	Swan, Cloke, Beams, Fasolo, Pendlebury, Thomas
Nil	Injuries	Goldsack (Ankle)

Brownlow Votes
3 Dane Swan (Collingwood); 2 Travis Cloke (Collingwood); 1 Scott Pendlebury (Collingwood)

Game Milestone
150 Angus Monfries; Debut Jackson Merrett

== Ladder ==
2012 AFL ladder
Pos	Team	Pld	W	L	D	PF	PA	PP	Pts	
1	Hawthorn	22	17	5	0	2679	1733	154.6	68	Finals series
2	Adelaide	22	17	5	0	2428	1833	132.5	68	Finals series
3	Sydney (P)	22	16	6	0	2290	1629	140.6	64	Finals series
4	Collingwood	22	16	6	0	2123	1823	116.5	64	Finals series
5	West Coast	22	15	7	0	2244	1807	124.2	60	Finals series
6	Geelong	22	15	7	0	2209	1886	117.1	60	Finals series
7	Fremantle	22	14	8	0	1956	1691	115.7	56	Finals series
8	North Melbourne	22	14	8	0	2359	2097	112.5	56	Finals series
9	St Kilda	22	12	10	0	2347	1903	123.3	48	
10	Carlton	22	11	11	0	2079	1925	108.0	44	
11	Essendon	22	11	11	0	2091	2090	100.0	44	
12	Richmond	22	10	11	1	2169	1943	111.6	42	
13	Brisbane Lions	22	10	12	0	1904	2092	91.0	40	
14	Port Adelaide	22	5	16	1	1691	2144	78.9	22	
15	Western Bulldogs	22	5	17	0	1542	2301	67.0	20	
16	Melbourne	22	4	18	0	1580	2341	67.5	16	
17	Gold Coast	22	3	19	0	1509	2481	60.8	12	
18	Greater Western Sydney	22	2	20	0	1270	2751	46.2	8	

Rules for classification: 1) points; 2) percentage; 3) number of points for.
(P) Premiers

=== Ladder progress ===
Round	1	2	3	4	5	6	7	8	9	10	11	12	13	14	15	16	17	18	19	20	21	22	23
Ground	A	H	A	A	A	H	H	H	A	H	H	B	A	H	A	A	A	H	A	H	H	A	H
Result	W	W	W	W	L	W	W	W	W	L	L		W	W	L	W	L	L	L	L	L	L	L
Position	9	5	4	3	5	4	2	3	2	2	4	6	3	4	6	6	6	7	8	8	10	11	11

Source: Competitive Matches
A = Away; H = Home; B = Bye; W = Win; D = Draw; L = Lose

== Tribunal cases ==
Player	Round	Charge category (Level)	Verdict	Points^{[a]}	Result	Victim	Club	Ref(s)
Sam Lonergan	2	Rough Conduct (2)	Guilty (Early Plea)	185.63	1 Week	Travis Boak	Port Adelaide	
Leroy Jetta	8	Striking (2)	Guilty (Appeal Denied)	137.50	1 Week	Dylan Grimes	Richmond	
David Zaharakis	9	Striking (2)	Guilty (Early Plea)	93.75	Reprimand	Tomas Bugg	Greater Western Sydney	
Jake Carlisle	9	Wrestling	Guilty (Early Plea)	0	$900	Jeremy Cameron	Greater Western Sydney	
Alwyn Davey	9	Wrestling	Guilty (Early Plea)	0	$900	Taylor Adams	Greater Western Sydney	
Paddy Ryder	10	Tripping (1)	Guilty (Early Plea)	66	Reprimand	Daniel Nicholson	Melbourne	
Alwyn Davey	11	Rough Conduct (3)	Guilty (Early Plea)	243.75	2 Weeks	Dan Hannebery	Sydney	
Stewart Crameri	14	Rough Conduct (3)	Guilty (Early Plea)	243.75	2 Weeks	Dylan Addison	Western Bulldogs	
Heath Hocking	15	Rough Conduct (2)	Guilty (Early Plea)	297.19	2 Weeks	Lenny Hayes	St Kilda	
Jake Carlisle	16	Rough Conduct (1)	Guilty (Early Plea)	93.75	Reprimand	Paul Stewart	Port Adelaide	

== Season statistics ==
=== Home attendance ===
Round	Opponent	Attendance
2	Port Adelaide	33,118
6	Brisbane Lions	36,361
7	West Coast	43,260
8	Richmond	80,900
10	Melbourne	42,987
11	Sydney	42,785
14	Western Bulldogs	40,824
18	Hawthorn	44,899
20	North Melbourne	42,674
21	Carlton	59,381
23	Collingwood	56,491
Total Attendance		523,680
Average Attendance		47,607

=== Awards ===
==== 2012 Brownlow Medal ====
Votes	Player
30	Jobe Watson
14	Brent Stanton
4	Tom Bellchambers
4	Michael Hurley
3	Dyson Heppell
3	Leroy Jetta
2	Stewart Crameri
1	Dustin Fletcher
1	Heath Hocking
1	Paddy Ryder

==== Crichton Medal ====
Votes	Player
551	Jobe Watson
310	Dyson Heppell
256	Dustin Fletcher
240	Brent Stanton
232	Ben Howlett
214	David Zaharakis
208	Courtenay Dempsey
198	Stewart Crameri
195	Paddy Ryder
117	Michael Hurley

==== Other Awards ====
Award Name	Player
Best Clubman	Dyson Heppell
Matthew Lloyd Senior Leading Goal Kicking	Stewart Crameri
Lindsay Griffiths Rising Star	Michael Hibberd
Most Improved Player	Jake Carlisle
Adam Ramanauskas Most Courageous Player	Ben Howlett
Best Team Player	Dustin Fletcher
Essendon Goal of the Year	Stewart Crameri
Essendon Mark of the Year	Dyson Heppell

== Season Financials ==
EFC Annual Report 2012

Item	$2012	$2011	Change
Revenue	$65,431,425	$51,416,731	$14,014,694
Membership & Reserved Seating	$9,367,066	$10,363,690	$996,624
Gate Receipts	$726,504	$963,101	$236,597
Marketing Revenue	$15,902,153	$15,532,108	$370,045
Merchandise Revenue	$3,226,302	$2,563,026	$663,276
Football Department Spend	$19,200,704	$18,510,078	$690,626
Operating Profit/Loss	$401,429	$1,024,086	$622,657
Total Profit/Loss	$12,345,536	$2,059,379	$10,286,157

== Notes ==
- ^{a} "Points" refers to carry-over points accrued following the sanction. For example, 154.69 points draw a one-match suspension, with 54.69 carry-over points (for every 100 points, a one-match suspension is given).
- ^{s} Denotes amount of seasons on the Essendon list only.
