= 2009 Essendon Football Club season =

Essendon Football Club
2009 season
- President: Ray Horsburgh
- Coach: Matthew Knights
- Captain: Matthew Lloyd
- Home ground: Etihad Stadium
- Pre-season competition: Semi final
- AFL season: 8th
- Finals series: Elimination final
- Best and Fairest: Jobe Watson
- Leading goalkicker: Matthew Lloyd (35)
- Highest home attendance: 84,829 vs. Collingwood (25 April 2009)
- Lowest home attendance: 27,461 vs. Fremantle (5 April 2009)
- Average home attendance: 50,707

== Pre-season ==
=== NAB Cup ===
Round	Date	Kick off (Local)	Opponent	Venue	Result F – A	Goal kickers	Attendance
First Round	13 February 2009	20:40	Western Bulldogs	Telstra Dome (A)	1.8.13(70) – 1.8.12(69)	Atkinson (9pts), Jetta (2), Neagle (2), Skipworth (2), Houli, Gumbleton	35,123
Quarter-finals	27 February 2009	19:40	Brisbane Lions	Telstra Dome (H)	0.9.13(67) – 1.7.14(65)	Lovett (2), Neagle, Hocking, Monfries, Skipworth, Jetta, Myers, Hille	12,260
Semi-finals	6 March 2009	19:40	Collingwood	Etihad Stadium (A)	3.6.10(73) – 1.17.5(116)	Dyson (9pts, 6pts), Ryder (9pts), Lloyd (9pts), Williams, Hille, Lucas, Dempsey, Bellchambers	26,154

=== Practice Match ===
Date	Kick off (Local)	Opponent	Venue	Result F – A	Goal kickers	Attendance
13 March 2009	16:30	North Melbourne	QE Oval	15.10(100) – 17.15(117)	Lloyd (3), Stanton (2), Hurley, Lonergan, Hocking, Hille, Lovett, Nash, Davey, Skipworth, Fletcher, Lucas	

== AFL Premiership Season ==
Round	Date	Kick off (Local)	Opponent	Venue	Result F – A	Goal kickers	Attendance
1	29 March 2009	14:40	Port Adelaide	AAMI Stadium (A)	9.12(66) – 15.17(107)	Stanton (2), Lovett, McPhee, Neagle, Monfries, Skipworth, Dempsey, Lucas	28,315
2	5 April 2009	13:10	Fremantle	Etihad Stadium (H)	16.13(109) – 10.11(71)	McPhee (3), Ryder (2), Winderlich (2), Lucas, Davey, Hocking, Lovett, Hille, Pears, Slattery, Dempsey, Skipworth	27,461
3	11 April 2009	19:10	Carlton	MCG (A)	17.14(116) – 16.16(112)	Lloyd (5), Dempsey (2), Lucas (2), Davey (2), Stanton (2), Watson, Skipworth, Ryder, Monfries	70,411
4	19 April 2009	13:10	North Melbourne	Etihad Stadium (A)	7.15(57) – 10.9(69)	Lloyd (3), Lovett, McPhee, Winderlich, Stanton	33,842
5	25 April 2009	14:20	Collingwood	MCG (H)	13.15(93) – 12.16(88)	Lovett (2), Dyson (2), Winderlich, Lonergan, McPhee, Monfries, Stanton, Davey, Ryder, Jetta, Zaharakis	84,829
6	2 May 2009	19:10	Brisbane Lions	The Gabba (A)	9.14(68) – 17.9(111)	Winderlich (2), Lloyd (2), Hocking, Lovett, Lovett-Murray, Zaharakis, Lonergan	29,252
7	8 May 2009	19:40	Hawthorn	Etihad Stadium (H)	17.14(116) – 10.12(72)	Lloyd (3), Lovett-Murray (3), Monfries (2), Neagle (2), Zaharakis, Lonergan, Hocking, Stanton, Bellchambers, Lovett	50,475
8	17 May 2009	16:40	St Kilda	Etihad Stadium (A)	10.11(71) – 13.12(90)	Lloyd (3), Neagle (3), Winderlich, Myers, Dempsey, Slattery	45,594
9	23 May 2009	19:10	Richmond	MCG (A)	19.11(125) – 12.13(85)	Lloyd (4), Davey (3), Zaharakis (3), Winderlich (2), Watson (2), Lovett (2), Hocking, Monfries, Lonergan	73,625
10	31 May 2009	14:10	Geelong	Etihad Stadium (H)	11.4(70) – 20.14(134)	Neagle (3), Hocking (2), Dyson, McVeigh, Hooker, Lloyd, Stanton, Lovett	48,852
11	7 June 2009	13:10	Adelaide	Etihad Stadium (H)	18.6(114) – 21.4(130)	Lucas (4), Watson (3), Monfries (2), Skipworth (2), Ryder, Dyson, McPhee, McVeigh, Lovett, Reimers, Davey	39,451
12	19 June 2009	19:40	Melbourne	Etihad Stadium (H)	19.17(131) – 13.5(83)	Lucas (3), Lloyd (3), Davey (2), Lonergan (2), Skipworth (2), Monfries (2), Watson, Hooker, Winderlich	45,740
13	26 June 2009	19:40	Carlton	MCG (H)	21.10(136) – 9.13(67)		83,407
14	3 July 2009	19:40	Collingwood	MCG (A)	9.13(67) – 15.12(102)		77,699
15	11 July 2009	14:10	Sydney	SCG (A)	15.17(107) – 10.12(72)		30,924
16	17 July 2009	19:40	Western Bulldogs	Etihad Stadium (H)	11.4(70) – 15.13(103)		47,120
17	26 July 2009	14:10	Richmond	MCG (H)	14.12(96) – 15.11(101)		47,412
18	2 August 2009	14:40	West Coast Eagles	Subiaco Oval (A)	10.8(68) – 14.11(95)		35,765
19	8 August 2009	19:10	Brisbane Lions	MCG (H)	13.9(87) – 12.15(87)		41,636
20	16 August 2009	16:40	St Kilda	Etihad Stadium (H)	16.14(110) – 16.12(108)		41,410
21	23 August 2009	14:40	Fremantle	Subiaco Oval (A)	13.9(87) – 21.15(141)		32,413
22	29 August 2009	14:10	Hawthorn	MCG (A)	16.20(116) – 14.15(99)		77,278

== AFL Finals Series ==
Round	Date	Kick off (Local)	Opponent	Venue	Result F – A	Goal kickers	Attendance
Elimination Final 1	4 September 2009	19:45	Adelaide	AAMI Stadium (A)	10.10(70) – 26.10(166)	McPhee (4), Skipworth (2), Monfries, Quinn, Stanton, Lovett	50,393
