= Cory Dell'Olio =

Australian rules footballer (born 1989)

Personal information
- Full name: Cory Dell'Olio
- Born: 8 December 1989 (age 36)
- Original team: South Fremantle
- Draft: No. 29, 2012 Rookie Draft, Essendon
- Height: 177 cm (5 ft 10 in)
- Weight: 81 kg (179 lb)

Club information
- Current club: Essendon
- Number: 47

Playing career^{1}
Years	Club	Games (Goals)
2012–2014	Essendon	16 (16)
- ^{1} Playing statistics correct to the end of 2014.

Career highlights
- South Fremantle leading goalkicker 2011

Cory Dell'Olio (born 8 December 1989) is an Australian rules football player who last played for the Essendon Football Club in the Australian Football League, before he was delisted at the end of the 2014 season. He was recruited with pick #29 in the 2011 Rookie Draft, having played as a small forward for the South Fremantle Football Club in the WAFL.

Prior to round 4 of the 2012 AFL season he was elevated to the senior list to replace Brent Prismall who was on the long-term injury list with an ACL injury. He made his debut that weekend against Carlton, starting the game as the substitute player and replacing Michael Hurley in the third quarter.

He was delisted by Essendon at the end of the 2014 season after only playing three games in 2013 and five in 2014. He returned to South Fremantle the following year.

Dell'Olio, along with 33 other Essendon players, was found guilty of using a banned performance-enhancing substance, thymosin beta-4, as part of Essendon's sports supplements program during the 2012 season. He and his team-mates were initially found not guilty in March 2015 by the AFL Anti-Doping Tribunal, but a guilty verdict was returned in January 2016 after an appeal by the World Anti-Doping Agency. He was suspended for two years which, with backdating, ended in November 2016; as a result, he served approximately fourteen months of his suspension and missed the entire 2016 WAFL season.
