= Graham Hocking =

Australian rules footballer

Personal information
- Full name: Graham Hocking
- Born: 8 January 1952 (age 74)
- Original team: Oakleigh District
- Height: 180 cm (5 ft 11 in)
- Weight: 76 kg (168 lb)

Club information
- Current club: South Melbourne
- Number: 47

Playing career^{1}
Years	Club	Games (Goals)
1971	South Melbourne	1 (0)
- ^{1} Playing statistics correct to the end of 1971.

Graham Hocking (born 8 January 1952) is a former professional Australian rules football player at the South Melbourne. He debuted against Hawthorn in round 5, 1971. He played 50 reserve games and one senior game. He is the father of Essendon player Heath Hocking.
