= Travis Colyer =

Australian rules footballer (born 1991)

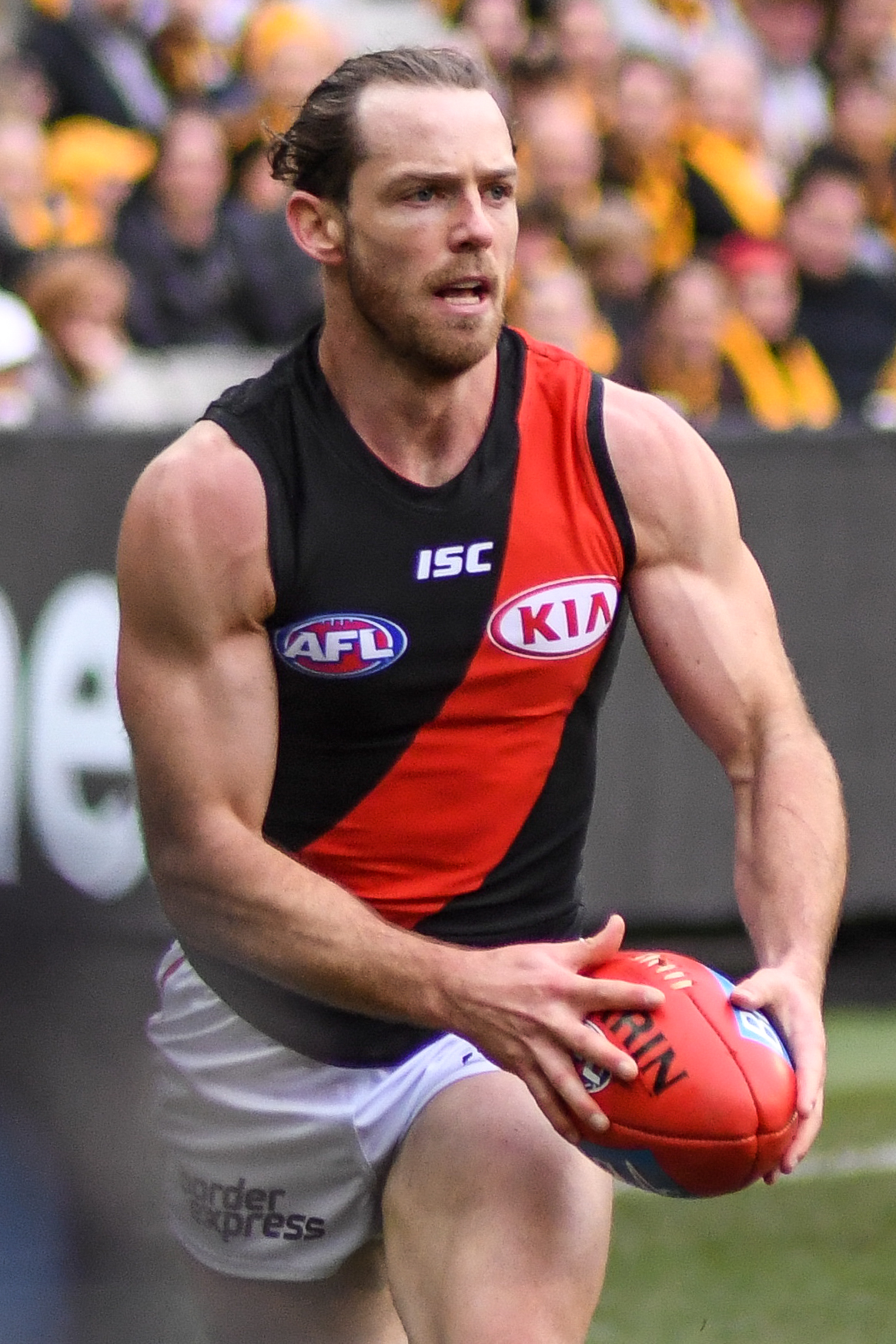
- Colyer playing for Essendon in August 2018

Personal information
- Full name: Travis Charles Colyer
- Born: 24 August 1991 (age 35)
- Original team: Claremont (WAFL)
- Draft: No. 26, 2009 national draft
- Height: 175 cm (5 ft 9 in)
- Weight: 75 kg (165 lb)
- Position: Midfielder / Forward

Playing career^{1}
| Years | Club | Games (Goals) |
| 2010–2018 | Essendon | 87 (54) |
| 2019–2023 | Fremantle | 59 (32) |
| Total | | 146 (86) |
- ^{1} Playing statistics correct to the end of round 24, 2023.

Travis Charles Colyer (born 24 August 1991) is a former professional Australian rules footballer who played for the Essendon Football Club and Fremantle Football Club in the Australian Football League (AFL).

== Early career ==
Colyer was selected by Essendon with the 26th pick in the 2009 AFL draft. He previously played for Claremont in the WAFL and Trinity College, Perth. He also represented Western Australia in the 2009 AFL National Under 18 Championships and was named in the 2009 U18 All Australian team.

== AFL career ==
Colyer played his first AFL game against Carlton in round 3 of the 2010 AFL season.

Colyer, along with 33 other Essendon players, was found guilty of using a banned performance enhancing substance, thymosin beta-4, as part of Essendon's sports supplements program during the 2012 season. He and his team-mates were initially found not guilty in March 2015 by the AFL Anti-Doping Tribunal, but a guilty verdict was returned in January 2016 after an appeal by the World Anti-Doping Agency. He was suspended for two years which, with backdating, ended in November 2016; as a result, he served approximately fourteen months of his suspension and missed the entire 2016 AFL season.

The 2017 AFL season saw Colyer have one of his best seasons to date, playing 22 of a possible 23 games and averaging 17 disposals and four marks a game.

Colyer had a frustrating start to 2018 missing half of the 2018 AFL season due to an ankle injury, which required surgery. He made his return for Essendon in round 15 playing eight of the final nine games. On 17 October 2018, in the final minutes of the 2018 AFL Trade Period, Colyer was traded to the Fremantle Football Club, for a future fourth-round selection, after nine seasons and eighty-seven games with Essendon.

The 2021 AFL season saw Colyer have a career best season in which he played every game and kicked fifteen goals. Colyer signed a one-year contract extension at the end of the 2021 tying him to Fremantle until at least 2022.

Colyer continued his run of career best form into 2022 playing 18 games in a wing/half-forward role, and kicking multiple goals against GWS and Hawthorn, the latter of which he was arguably best on ground. Colyer signed a one-year contract extension at the end of the season.

Colyer missed the first 5 games of the 2023 AFL season after a knee injury sustained during preseason saw him undergo surgery. However, he was not selected by Fremantle for the remainder of the season. Instead, he played for their WAFL affiliated side, Peel Thunder. He kicked two goals in the WAFL Grand Final against East Fremantle. In August, following the final game of Fremantle's season, Colyer along with teammate Nathan Wilson were informed that they would not be offered contracts in 2024, seemingly ending Colyer's football career after 14 years in the AFL.

== Statistics ==
Statistics are correct to the end of round 24, 2023

Legend
| G | Goals | K | Kicks | D | Disposals | T | Tackles |
| B | Behinds | H | Handballs | M | Marks |

| Season | Team | No. | Games | Totals | | | | | | | Averages (per game) | | | | | | |
| Season | Team | No. | Games | G | B | K | H | D | M | T | G | B | K | H | D | M | T |
|---|---|---|---|---|---|---|---|---|---|---|---|---|---|---|---|---|---|
| 2010 | Essendon | 32 | 11 | 7 | 10 | 102 | 100 | 202 | 31 | 33 | 0.6 | 0.9 | 9.3 | 9.1 | 18.4 | 2.8 | 3.0 |
| 2011 | Essendon | 32 | 10 | 7 | 7 | 73 | 32 | 105 | 25 | 18 | 0.7 | 0.7 | 7.3 | 3.2 | 10.5 | 2.5 | 1.8 |
| 2012 | Essendon | 32 | 6 | 3 | 4 | 50 | 22 | 72 | 15 | 15 | 0.5 | 0.7 | 8.3 | 3.7 | 12.0 | 2.5 | 2.5 |
| 2013 | Essendon | 32 | 7 | 5 | 3 | 57 | 32 | 89 | 26 | 10 | 0.7 | 0.4 | 8.1 | 4.6 | 12.7 | 3.7 | 1.4 |
| 2014 | Essendon | 32 | 12 | 7 | 8 | 143 | 60 | 203 | 56 | 29 | 0.6 | 0.7 | 11.9 | 5.0 | 16.9 | 4.7 | 2.4 |
| 2015 | Essendon | 32 | 11 | 11 | 4 | 113 | 65 | 178 | 41 | 30 | 1.0 | 0.4 | 10.3 | 5.9 | 16.2 | 3.7 | 2.7 |
| 2016 | Essendon | 32 | 0 | — | — | — | — | — | — | — | — | — | — | — | — | — | — |
| 2017 | Essendon | 32 | 22 | 12 | 13 | 208 | 160 | 368 | 86 | 63 | 0.5 | 0.6 | 9.5 | 7.3 | 16.7 | 3.9 | 2.9 |
| 2018 | Essendon | 32 | 8 | 2 | 2 | 60 | 47 | 107 | 31 | 16 | 0.3 | 0.3 | 7.5 | 5.9 | 13.4 | 3.9 | 2.0 |
| 2019 | Fremantle | 33 | 10 | 5 | 6 | 91 | 54 | 145 | 32 | 23 | 0.5 | 0.6 | 9.1 | 5.4 | 14.5 | 3.2 | 2.3 |
| 2020 (Note: The 2020 season was played with 17 home-and-away matches per team (down from 22) and 16-minute quarters with time on (down from 20-minute quarters with time on) due to the impact of the COVID-19 pandemic.) | Fremantle | 33 | 9 | 3 | 2 | 54 | 26 | 80 | 16 | 9 | 0.3 | 0.2 | 6.0 | 2.9 | 8.9 | 1.8 | 1.0 |
| 2021 | Fremantle | 33 | 22 | 15 | 19 | 195 | 83 | 278 | 75 | 44 | 0.7 | 0.9 | 8.9 | 3.8 | 12.6 | 3.4 | 2.0 |
| 2022 | Fremantle | 33 | 18 | 9 | 6 | 148 | 54 | 202 | 63 | 31 | 0.6 | 0.2 | 8.7 | 3.2 | 11.9 | 3.1 | 2.1 |
| 2023 | Fremantle | 33 | 0 | — | — | — | — | — | — | — | — | — | — | — | — | — | — |
| Career | | | 146 | 86 | 84 | 1294 | 735 | 2029 | 497 | 321 | 0.6 | 0.6 | 8.9 | 5.2 | 14.1 | 3.4 | 2.3 |
