= Ricky Dyson =

Australian rules footballer, born 1985

Personal information
- Full name: Ricky Dyson
- Born: 28 September 1985 (age 41)
- Original team: Epping
- Draft: #44, 2003 National Draft, Essendon
- Height: 182 cm (6 ft 0 in)
- Weight: 82 kg (181 lb)
- Position: Midfield

Playing career^{1}
Years	Club	Games (Goals)
2004–2012	Essendon	114 (43)
- ^{1} Playing statistics correct to the end of 2012.

Ricky Dyson (born 28 September 1985) is a former professional Australian rules footballer who played for the Essendon Football Club in the Australian Football League (AFL).

Originally from the Epping Football Club, and drafted at number 44 in the 2003 National Draft, Dyson played mainly as a midfielder.

== AFL career ==
Having played for the Northern Knights in the TAC Cup, Dyson was taken in the 2003 National Draft with pick No. 44 by Essendon. He made his debut, aged 18, in round 3 of the 2004 AFL season, when Essendon played the West Coast Eagles at Docklands Stadium. He would go on to play 11 games in his debut season.

Dyson managed to play 10 games in his second season, having been affected by groin soreness. During the pre-season the next year, Dyson was assaulted in Port Melbourne, interrupting his preparation. In addition, he continued to be plagued by groin soreness during the season proper, although he managed to play 10 consecutive games for the first time, finishing the year with 17 games in total. Dyson nonetheless struggled to retain his spot in the senior side, and began to doubt his playing ability as a result.

At the end of the 2007 AFL season, Dyson was offered a three-year contract at the Fremantle Football Club—an offer he reluctantly considered, given the stop-start nature of his career at Essendon. At the same time, Kevin Sheedy was replaced as coach of Essendon by Matthew Knights, who had previously coached Essendon's VFL affiliate, the Bendigo Bombers. Knights had frequently bolstered Dyson's confidence whenever he had been dropped from the senior side to play for Bendigo, and told Dyson that he would be a required player at Essendon. Having not particularly wanted to leave Essendon anyway, Dyson agreed to stay and play under Knights.

During 2008, Dyson yet again had his football career interrupted, this time by an appendectomy.

Prior to the Anzac Day clash in 2009, Dyson was dropped from the senior side to instead play for Bendigo. The day before the match he was brought back into the senior side with a late change, replacing the injured Mark McVeigh. Given an opportunity that he would not have had previously, Dyson purely wanted to "play [his] role for the team." He went on to amass 27 disposals, and kicked 2 goals, one of them coming from the boundary line at a critical stage late in the game in what would be his 5th best game statistically over the course of his career to date. Dyson would go on to play every game in Essendon's home-and-away season, as well as the Elimination Final—his first—against Adelaide at Football Park.

The following year, in 2010, Dyson lost the confidence of Knights, making only nine appearances for the year.

In 2011 AFL season, Dyson's former captain James Hird succeeded Knights as senior coach of Essendon. Dyson spent the earlier parts of the season in the VFL playing for Bendigo and was seen as a standout there in the player review at the end of the year. His wait for a call-up to the seniors was a protracted one until he was selected to play against Richmond in round 16, 11 months after his previous senior appearance.

He played his 100th AFL game in round 19 against Collingwood at the Melbourne Cricket Ground on 31 July. Dyson was primarily used in 2011 as a running defender who would rotate through the midfield.

Dyson, along with 33 other Essendon players, was found guilty of using a banned performance-enhancing substance, thymosin beta-4, as part of Essendon's sports supplements program during the 2012 season. He and his team-mates were initially found not guilty in March 2015 by the AFL Anti-Doping Tribunal, but a guilty verdict was returned in January 2016 after an appeal by the World Anti-Doping Agency. He was suspended for two years which, with backdating, ended in November 2016; as a result, he served approximately fourteen months of his suspension and missed the entire 2016 suburban football season.

== Personal life ==
For several years Dyson participated in Essendon's "On the Ball" program, which involved him and teammate Brent Prismall, as well as netball players Shelley O'Donnell and Bianca Chatfield, meeting with school groups and educating them on issues such as drug use and sports. Dyson took a year off from the program in 2008 to study and complete a personal training course.

== Statistics ==
Legend
G	Goals	K	Kicks	D	Disposals	T	Tackles
B	Behinds	H	Handballs	M	Marks

Season	Team	No.	Games	Totals							Averages (per game)						
Season	Team	No.	Games	G	B	K	H	D	M	T	G	B	K	H	D	M	T
2004	Essendon	36	11	7	3	53	30	83	22	9	0.6	0.3	4.8	2.7	7.6	2.0	0.8
2005	Essendon	2	10	9	4	91	44	135	32	11	0.9	0.4	9.1	4.4	13.5	3.2	1.1
2006	Essendon	2	17	9	8	124	100	224	40	28	0.5	0.5	7.3	5.9	13.2	2.4	1.6
2007	Essendon	2	11	3	2	70	69	139	29	16	0.3	0.2	6.4	6.3	12.6	2.6	1.4
2008	Essendon	2	15	3	2	145	122	267	48	29	0.2	0.1	9.7	8.1	17.8	3.2	1.9
2009	Essendon	2	23	8	8	266	170	436	79	55	0.4	0.4	11.6	7.4	19.0	3.4	2.4
2010	Essendon	2	9	1	4	92	54	146	40	23	0.1	0.4	10.2	6.0	16.2	4.4	2.6
2011	Essendon	2	6	0	0	52	36	88	18	17	0.0	0.0	8.7	6.0	14.7	3.0	2.8
2012	Essendon	2	12	3	5	157	72	229	65	24	0.2	0.4	13.1	6.0	19.1	5.4	2.0
Career			114	43	36	1050	697	1747	373	212	0.4	0.3	9.2	6.1	15.3	3.3	1.9
