= Andrew Lovett =

Personal information
- Full name: Andrew Lovett
- Born: 11 November 1982 (age 44)
- Original team: Northern Knights/East Perth
- Draft: 42nd overall, 2004 Rookie Draft
- Height: 183 cm (6 ft 0 in)
- Weight: 75 kg (165 lb)
- Position: Midfielder

Playing career^{1}
Years	Club	Games (Goals)
2005–2009	Essendon	88 (93)

International team honours^{2}
Years	Team	Games (Goals)
2005	Australia	? (?)
- ^{1} Playing statistics correct to the end of 2010.^{2} Representative statistics correct as of 2005.

Career highlights
- Anzac Day Medal 2005

Andrew Lovett (born 11 November 1982) is an Aboriginal Australian rules footballer who played in the Australian Football League (AFL) for Essendon between 2005 and 2009. He was traded to St Kilda at the end of the 2009 season, but his contract was terminated in February 2010 before he ever played a game for the club.

== Early life ==
Lovett has Indigenous Australian heritage and his tribal ancestry can be traced to the Gunditjmara. He is the cousin of Nathan Lovett-Murray.

Lovett played for the Northern Knights in the TAC Cup and North Heidelberg in the Northern Football League before relocating to Perth to play for East Perth in the West Australian Football League (WAFL), where he hoped he could be drafted into the AFL.

== AFL career ==
Lovett was selected by Essendon in 2003 in the Rookie Draft. He remained a rookie, playing for the Bendigo Bombers, until he made his AFL debut against Hawthorn.

Lovett was a member of the Australian team that won the Cormac McAnallen Cup during the 2005 International Rules Series. He also won the Anzac Day Medal in 2005.

At the end of the 2008 season, Lovett was mentioned as a potential trade for Essendon. The Geelong Football Club were said to be the most interested in securing the lively forward who still had one year to run on his contract at Essendon. Although a trade did not eventuate, his form in the 2009 season saw another offer - this time from St Kilda, who traded their first round pick (#16). Lovett accepted the move despite other offers (from the Brisbane Lions and Port Adelaide) to remain in Melbourne with his family and friends whilst having the prospects of being involved in a premiership team. He was later given the number 9 guernsey, which was last worn by goalkicker Fraser Gehrig.

In December 2009 Lovett was suspended indefinitely by the St Kilda Football Club following allegations of being involved in a sexual assault and on 16 February 2010 he was dismissed from the club when rape charges were laid. On 25 July 2011, Lovett was acquitted of the charges.

In the time between his dismissal from St Kilda and his acquittal, Lovett returned to East Perth to play the latter half of the 2010 WAFL season. He then played for the NFL's Fitzroy Stars Football Club in 2011.

Lovett nominated for the AFL rookie draft in 2011 and again in 2014 but was not selected in either draft.

In 2024, Lovett received an eight month prison sentence after pleading guilty to 24 charges relating to domestic violence between February 2020 and December 2023.
