= Kyle Hardingham =

Australian rules footballer (born 1988)

Personal information
- Full name: Kyle Hardingham
- Born: 1 September 1988 (age 38)
- Original team: East Fremantle
- Draft: 7th overall, 2009 Pre-Season Draft; Essendon
- Height: 186 cm (6 ft 1 in)
- Weight: 86 kg (190 lb)
- Position: Defender

Playing career^{1}
Years	Club	Games (Goals)
2010–2014	Essendon	65 (21)
- ^{1} Playing statistics correct to the end of 2014.

Kyle Hardingham (born 1 September 1988) is a former professional Australian rules footballer who played for the Essendon Football Club in the Australian Football League (AFL).

Hardingham was selected by Essendon with the seventh pick in the 2010 AFL Pre-Season Draft. Originally from East Fremantle in the WAFL, he represented Western Australia in the state game against South Australia in 2009.

He made his AFL debut against North Melbourne in round 17 of the 2010 AFL season, kicking four goals, helping Essendon achieve an upset victory by 3 points. The following Friday night, he kicked two goals in a win against St Kilda. He managed to kick two goals once again in the next game, a 76-point loss to Carlton, although he also kicked two behinds as part of the wayward kicking by the entire Essendon team, which managed 9.19 for the night.

Hardingham was delisted at the conclusion of the 2014 AFL season. He remained with Essendon as a VFL-listed player in its reserves team in 2016.

Hardingham, along with 33 other Essendon players, was found guilty of using a banned performance-enhancing substance, thymosin beta-4, as part of Essendon's sports supplements program during the 2012 season. He and his teammates were initially found not guilty in March 2015 by the AFL Anti-Doping Tribunal, but a guilty verdict was returned in January 2016 after an appeal by the World Anti-Doping Agency. He was suspended for two years which, with backdating, ended in November 2016; as a result, he served approximately fourteen months of his suspension and missed the entire 2016 season.

Following his suspension, Hardingham signed as a playing coach at Pascoe Vale in the Essendon District Football League (EDFL).

== Statistics ==
Statistics are correct to end of the 2012 season.

Season	Team	No.	Games	Totals							Averages (per game)						
Season	Team	No.	Games	G	B	K	H	D	M	T	G	B	K	H	D	M	T
2010	Essendon	34	6	8	8	36	24	60	28	12	1.3	1.3	6.0	4.0	10.0	4.7	2.0
2011	Essendon	34	22	1	0	213	118	331	112	41	0.0	0.0	9.7	5.4	15.0	5.1	1.9
2012	Essendon	34	21	0	0	162	90	252	82	36	0.0	0.0	7.7	4.3	12.0	3.9	1.7
Career			49	9	8	411	232	643	222	89	0.2	0.2	8.4	4.7	13.1	4.5	1.8

Legend
G	Goals	K	Kicks	D	Disposals	T	Tackles
B	Behinds	H	Handballs	M	Marks
