= Brett O'Hanlon =

Australian rules footballer

Personal information
- Full name: Brett O'Hanlon
- Born: 17 July 1993 (age 33)
- Original team: Dandenong Stingrays (TAC Cup)
- Draft: No. 9, 2012 Pre-season Draft: Richmond
- Height: 189 cm (6 ft 2 in)
- Weight: 87 kg (192 lb)
- Position: Half forward flank

Club information
- Current club: Richmond
- Number: 45

Playing career^{1}
Years	Club	Games (Goals)
2012–2014	Richmond	9 (2)
- ^{1} Playing statistics correct to the end of Round 21, 2014.

Brett O'Hanlon (born 17 July 1993) is an Australian rules footballer currently playing for the Richmond Football Club in the Australian Football League (AFL).

O'Hanlon was drafted from the Dandenong Stingrays in the TAC Cup with the ninth selection in the 2012 AFL Preseason Draft.

He made his AFL debut for Richmond against Fremantle in Round 11 of the 2012 AFL season as the substitute player, replacing Ben Griffiths at three-quarter time. O'Hanlon played the 2021 VFL Season for the Frankston Football Club.
