= Nick O'Brien =

Australian rules footballer

Personal information
- Full name: Nicholas O'Brien
- Born: 26 June 1993 (age 33)
- Original team: North Ballarat Rebels (TAC Cup)
- Draft: No. 59, 2011 National Draft
- Height: 188 cm (6 ft 2 in)
- Weight: 91 kg (201 lb)
- Position: Midfielder

Playing career^{1}
| Years | Club | Games (Goals) |
| 2012–2015 | Essendon | 14 (4) |
- ^{1} Playing statistics correct to the end of 2015.

Career highlights
- None

Nicholas O'Brien (born 26 June 1993) is a former professional Australian rules footballer who played for the Essendon Football Club in the Australian Football League (AFL). He attended St Patrick's College in Ballarat. In 2011, he captained the St Patrick's schoolboy side to a victory in the MCC Herald Sun Shield He was recruited by Essendon with the 59th overall pick in the 2011 national draft. He made his debut in round 22, 2012, against Richmond at the Melbourne Cricket Ground.

He was delisted by Essendon in November 2015.

In 2016, O'Brien joined Woodville-West Torrens Eagles in the SANFL.
