= Adam McPhee =

Australian rules footballer (born 1982)

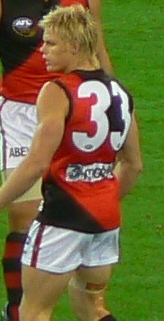

Personal information
- Full name: Adam McPhee
- Nickname: Smokey
- Born: 6 October 1982 (age 44); Melbourne, Australia
- Original team: Dandenong U18 (TAC Cup)
- Draft: No. 39, 2000 National Draft, Fremantle; No. 3, 2010 Pre-Season Draft, Fremantle
- Height: 190 cm (6 ft 3 in)
- Weight: 89 kg (196 lb)
- Position: Forward/Defender

Playing career^{1}
Years	Club	Games (Goals)
2001–2002	Fremantle	25 (9)
2003–2009	Essendon	142 (83)
2010–2012	Fremantle	56 (20)
Total		223 (112)

International team honours
Years	Team	Games (Goals)
2004	Australia	2 (0)
- ^{1} Playing statistics correct to the end of 2012.

Career highlights
- All-Australian team: 2004; Essendon Best & Fairest: 2004; AFL Rising Star nominee: 2001

Adam McPhee (born 6 October 1982) is an Australian rules football player who played for the Fremantle Football Club and the Essendon Football Club in the Australian Football League (AFL). He is a versatile player who has played both as a forward, defender and tagging role, with high-profile clashes with Gary Ablett, Jr. and Chris Judd in 2010.

== Australian Football League career ==
=== First stint at Fremantle ===
McPhee was originally recruited by Fremantle from the Dandenong Stingrays in the TAC Cup with the 39th selection in the 2000 AFL draft. He made his AFL debut in 2001 and was nominated for the AFL Rising Star award that year. By the end of 2002, McPhee played 25 games in total for the Dockers. He was then traded to Essendon in his home state of Victoria in a three-way deal also involving Brisbane. Essendon had previously hoped to draft him late in the 2000 draft, but Fremantle had picked him ahead of where Essendon had expected him to be taken.

=== Essendon years ===
In McPhee's first year at Essendon he played every game and his tough approach earned him the club's "most courageous player" award. However it was in 2004 that McPhee really made his mark as an AFL player. In that year he was selected on the half-back flank in the All-Australian team, won the W.S. Crichton Medal as Essendon's best and fairest player and was Essendon's highest vote getter in the Brownlow Medal.

In 2005, McPhee was restricted to only 14 games through injury and could not repeat his feats of 2004.

On 30 July 2006, McPhee played his 100th senior game at the Telstra Dome. It was capped off with a win over the Brisbane Lions which broke, what was at the time, the club's longest streak without a win in its history, when he took a spectacular mark and also kicked a magnificent goal on the run. He missed out on the honour the previous week because of a one match suspension served for striking St Kilda's Robert Harvey in an attempted spoil.

On 25 April 2009, in the Anzac Day match, McPhee celebrated his 150th game with a five-point victory over Collingwood.

=== Return to Fremantle ===
After long discussions about a new contract with the Bombers, McPhee did not sign a new contract with Essendon by the 2.00pm deadline on 10 November 2009. Many believe McPhee left Essendon due to a fall out with the Coach of Essendon at the time, Matthew Knights. McPhee was expected to nominate to be drafted to another club and as expected, his former club Fremantle selected him with their selection in the pre-season draft. The possible move to Fremantle had been heavily criticised in some circles, partly as a result of the club's recent history in drafting mature-age recruits, but it has been applauded in other circles as the club gave up virtually nothing to land him. His first match against his old club Essendon saw him hit the post twice, drop marks and kick out of bounds on the full right in front of Bombers fans who booed him consistently throughout the match. Despite his clangers, Fremantle managed to upset Essendon by 44 points.

After McPhee's tough start in his return to Fremantle, he improved as the season went on after a change in role. McPhee played his best football for the Dockers towards the end of the season as a run-with player (tagger), a role which requires stopping the influence of the opposition team's most damaging players. McPhee's best game came against Hawthorn in the Elimination final, keeping Hawks champion Luke Hodge to just 13 disposals, and only 5 in the first three quarters.

In 2012 McPhee returned to the backline under new coach Ross Lyon, but mainly played on the smaller forwards.

At the end of the 2012 season, a month after signing a one-year contract extension, McPhee retired from AFL football for family reasons. While there was much speculation he would return to his former club, the Essendon Football Club, he returned to Melbourne to work for his father-in-law's company. He continues to play football and as of 2015 is playing for St Mary's in the Geelong Football League.

== Statistics ==
Legend
G	Goals	K	Kicks	D	Disposals	T	Tackles
B	Behinds	H	Handballs	M	Marks

Season	Team	No.	Games	Totals							Averages (per game)							Votes
Season	Team	No.	Games	G	B	K	H	D	M	T	G	B	K	H	D	M	T	Votes
2001	Fremantle	17	14	5	3	116	65	181	61	32	0.4	0.2	8.3	4.6	12.9	4.4	2.3	0
2002	Fremantle	17	11	4	1	71	37	108	46	17	0.4	0.1	6.5	3.4	9.8	4.2	1.5	0
2003	Essendon	33	24	10	7	177	140	317	98	67	0.4	0.3	7.4	5.8	13.2	4.1	2.8	0
2004	Essendon	33	21	15	9	237	125	362	125	56	0.7	0.4	11.3	6.0	17.2	6.0	2.7	12
2005	Essendon	33	14	9	4	185	72	257	113	32	0.6	0.3	13.2	5.1	18.4	8.1	2.3	6
2006	Essendon	33	20	8	9	234	113	347	142	56	0.4	0.5	11.7	5.7	17.4	7.1	2.8	0
2007	Essendon	33	22	7	4	279	166	445	181	68	0.3	0.2	12.7	7.5	20.2	8.2	3.1	6
2008	Essendon	33	20	18	12	188	119	307	143	55	0.9	0.6	9.4	6.0	15.4	7.2	2.8	1
2009	Essendon	33	21	16	8	207	164	371	136	55	0.8	0.4	9.9	7.8	17.7	6.5	2.6	1
2010	Fremantle	9	23	9	17	179	140	319	95	107	0.4	0.7	7.8	6.1	13.9	4.1	4.7	0
2011	Fremantle	9	12	9	12	86	61	147	40	33	0.8	1.0	7.2	5.1	12.3	3.3	2.8	0
2012	Fremantle	9	21	2	0	235	109	344	124	36	0.1	0.0	11.2	5.2	16.4	5.9	1.7	0
Career			223	112	86	2194	1311	3505	1304	614	0.5	0.4	9.8	5.9	15.7	5.8	2.8	26
