= Ben Howlett (footballer) =

Australian rules footballer (born 1988)

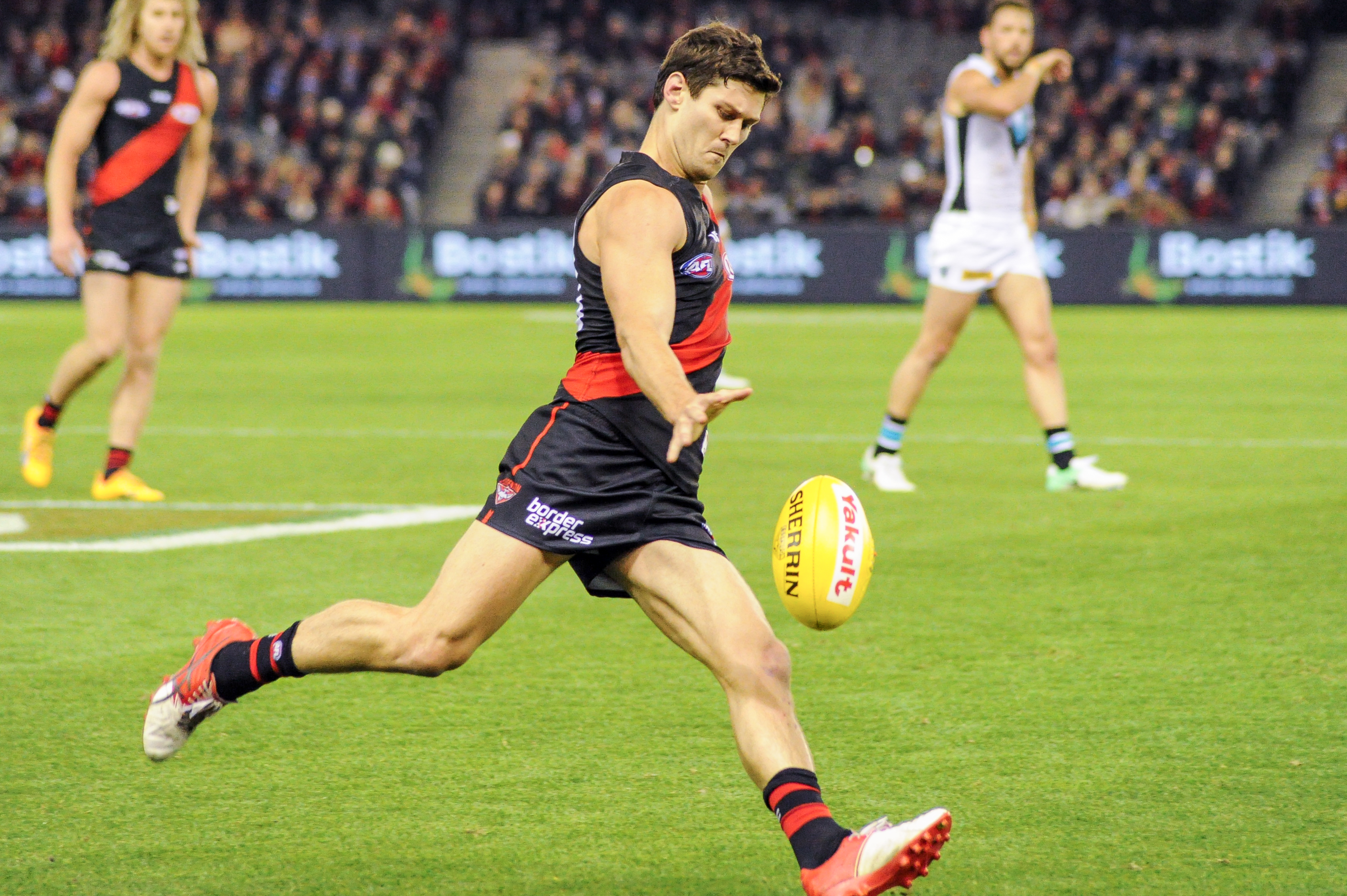
- Howlett playing for Essendon in June 2017

Personal information
- Full name: Ben Howlett
- Born: 21 October 1988 (age 38); Donnybrook, Western Australia
- Original team: Donnybrook
- Draft: No. 30, 2009 rookie draft
- Height: 180 cm (5 ft 11 in)
- Weight: 75 kg (165 lb)
- Position: Midfielder / forward

Playing career
Years	Club	Games (Goals)
2006–2009	Peel Thunder	61 (19)
2010–2017	Essendon	124 (58)
2018–2021	Peel Thunder	40 (18)
Total		101 (37)

Career highlights
- Peel Thunder best and fairest 2009, 2018; Peel Thunder captain: 2019–2021

Ben Howlett (born 21 October 1988) is a former professional Australian rules footballer who played for the Essendon Football Club in the Australian Football League (AFL).

Howlett was selected by Essendon with pick 30 in the 2010 rookie draft, as a 21-year-old from Peel Thunder in the West Australian Football League. His final season with Peel Thunder saw him claim the club's best and fairest award. He was promoted to Essendon's senior list in the 2010 season.

Howlett, along with 33 other Essendon players, was found guilty of using a banned performance-enhancing substance, thymosin beta-4, as part of Essendon's sports supplements program during the 2012 season. He and his teammates were initially found not guilty in March 2015 by the AFL Anti-Doping Tribunal, but a guilty verdict was returned in January 2016 after an appeal by the World Anti-Doping Agency. He was suspended for one season which, with backdating, ended in November 2016; as a result, he served approximately fourteen months of his suspension and missed the entire 2016 AFL season.

Howlett was delisted at the conclusion of the 2017 AFL season. He returned home to WA and signed with the club he was originally drafted from, Peel Thunder in the WAFL, for the 2018 season. In 2019, Howlett was named captain of the club, taking over from dual premiership captain Gerald Ugle.

In Round 9 of the 2021 WAFL season Howlett played his 100th game for Peel Thunder against Swan Districts before announcing his retirement from WAFL footy at the end of that season.

== Statistics ==
Legend
G	Goals	K	Kicks	D	Disposals	T	Tackles
B	Behinds	H	Handballs	M	Marks

Season	Team	No.	Games	Totals							Averages (per game)						
Season	Team	No.	Games	G	B	K	H	D	M	T	G	B	K	H	D	M	T
2010	Essendon	40	15	6	2	140	142	282	43	93	0.4	0.1	9.3	9.5	18.8	2.9	6.2
2011	Essendon	40	23	9	5	248	177	425	59	153	0.4	0.2	10.8	7.7	18.5	2.6	6.6
2012	Essendon	40	19	6	8	205	169	374	62	121	0.3	0.4	10.8	8.9	19.7	3.3	6.4
2013	Essendon	40	19	14	5	171	130	301	55	109	0.7	0.3	9	6.8	15.8	2.9	5.7
2014	Essendon	40	21	12	6	180	143	323	77	130	0.6	0.3	8.6	6.8	15.4	3.7	6.2
2015	Essendon	40	20	10	7	154	166	320	61	122	0.5	0.4	7.7	8.3	16.0	3.1	6.1
2017	Essendon	40	7	1	2	40	55	95	18	30	0.1	0.3	5.7	7.9	13.6	2.6	4.3
Career			124	58	35	1138	982	2120	375	758	0.5	0.3	9.2	7.9	17.1	3.0	6.1
