= Jake Carlisle =

Australian rules footballer

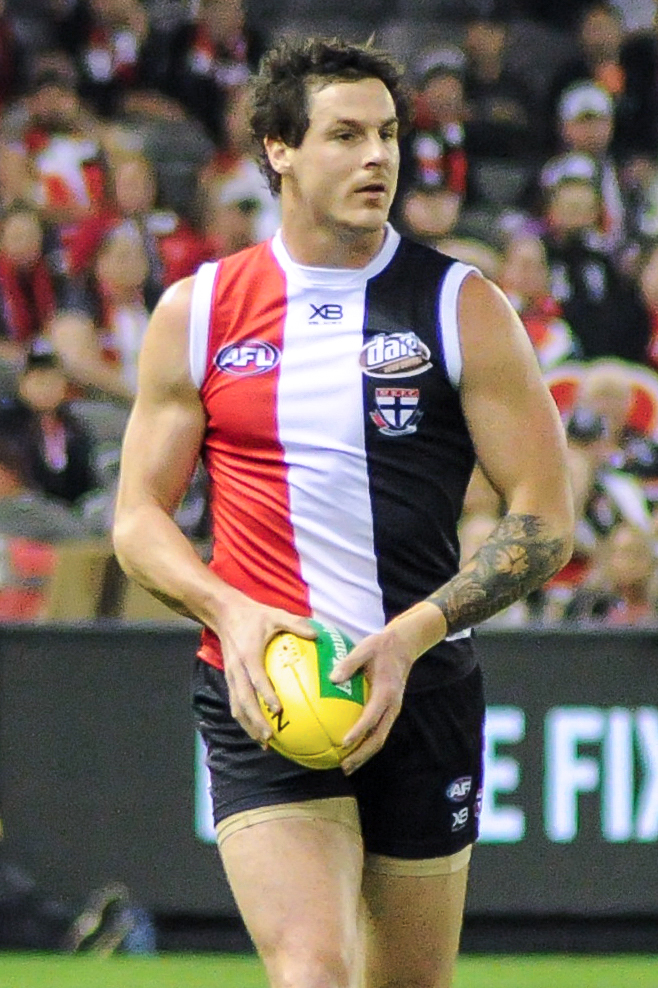
- Carlisle playing for St Kilda in April 2018

Personal information
- Full name: Jake Carlisle
- Born: 1 October 1991 (age 35)
- Original team: Calder Cannons (TAC Cup)
- Draft: No. 24, 2009 National Draft
- Height: 200 cm (6 ft 7 in)
- Weight: 106 kg (234 lb)
- Position: Defender

Playing career^{1}
Years	Club	Games (Goals)
2010–2015	Essendon	85 (54)
2016–2021	St Kilda	66 (8)
Total		151 (62)
- ^{1} Playing statistics correct to the end of 2021.

Career highlights
- 2× 22under22 team: 2013, 2014; AFL Rising Star nominee: 2012

Jake Carlisle (born 1 October 1991) is a former professional Australian rules footballer who played 66 games for the St Kilda Football Club in the Australian Football League (AFL) until his retirement at the end of the 2021 season. He previously played 85 games for the Essendon Football Club from 2010 to 2015.

== Early life ==
Carlisle was selected by Essendon with pick 24 in the 2009 National Draft. Like fellow draftee Jake Melksham, he is a local to the Essendon area. He played with the Calder Cannons in the TAC Cup and Craigieburn in the EDFL. He represented Vic Metro in the 2009 AFL National Under 18 Championships and was part of the 2009 Premiership team.

== AFL career ==
Carlisle made his debut in Round 20 of the 2010 AFL season, against Collingwood, a game which the young team lost by 98 points. Essendon coach Matthew Knights claimed that Carlisle and fellow debutant, Stewart Crameri, will have "come away from the match with enormous knowledge of how hard they have to train now and how hard they have to work in the off-season to keep building their football."

He had a break-out 2012, his consistency in the back-line did not go unnoticed, earning an AFL Rising Star nomination against Greater Western Sydney in Round 9. While Jake spent the majority of his time on the last line of defence, he also enjoyed the odd cameo role up forward. Fearless around packs and a strong contested mark, his impressive season was cut short with a foot injury in Round 19.

Carlisle was a major factor of the Bombers' racing out to a 6–0 start and being 13–3 after Round 17 in 2013, his switches to the forward line providing an X-Factor in getting the bombers over the line, such as in Round 14 against the West Coast Eagles, where Carlisle kicked two late goals, including one to level the scores with under two minutes remaining, as the bombers earned a 7-point victory.

In September 2015 Carlisle requested a trade out of Essendon after delaying contract talks until the end of the season. It had been reported during the season that he had appeared disenchanted as the supplements scandal continued to heavily impact on the club, and in their Round 19 loss to Greater Western Sydney, Carlisle was reported to have yelled "This club is fucked" as he walked to the interchange bench. In October 2015, after much deliberation, Carlisle nominated St Kilda over Carlton as the club he wished to be traded to from Essendon. He was officially traded to St Kilda on 21 October.

During his first pre-season with St Kilda, Carlisle and 33 other players who were at Essendon were found guilty of using a banned performance-enhancing substance, thymosin beta-4, as part of Essendon's sports supplements program during the 2012 season. He and his team-mates were initially found not guilty in March 2015 by the AFL Anti-Doping Tribunal, but a guilty verdict was returned in January 2016 after an appeal by the World Anti-Doping Agency. He was suspended for two years which, with backdating, ended in November 2016; as a result, he served approximately fourteen months of his suspension and missed the entire 2016 AFL season. He had also received a two-match internal suspension at St Kilda after footage emerged of him using recreational drugs, but the club later waived it, determining that it was served concurrently with the season-long ban.

Carlisle played all 22 games in his first proper season at St Kilda in 2017, following the trade and suspension. The Saints finished mid-table that year with 11 wins and 11 losses.

In 2018 Carlisle played 17 matches (4 wins, 1 draw and 12 losses) with the Saints' rebuild taking a backwards step. Carlisle would have played more games, but was suspended for two matches for striking Richmond's Jack Riewoldt and suffered a punctured lung in another incident after a mistake by club doctors.

Carlisle managed only 10 games for the 2019 season due to injury, requiring surgery on his back for a protruding disc prior to the commencement of the season. He eventually returned in round 14 and played 10 consecutive games as the Saints transitioned to new coach Brett Ratten. Carlisle triggered an automatic 1-year contract extension upon reaching a games clause.

Carlisle played 13 of a possible 19 games in a COVID-interrupted season, including the Saints' elimination final win against the Western Bulldogs. Carlisle was unable to play in the Saints' semi final game against Richmond due to the birth of his third child. Carlisle signed a further 1-year contract at the end of the year to remain at the club for the 2021 season.

Carlisle was not selected for the first two rounds of the year, despite being available. He eventually returned to the side in Round Three, and played four consecutive games including an influential game against Port Adelaide in Round Six. This would consequently be his last AFL match. Carlisle suffered a back complaint during training ahead of Round Seven, and eventually was sent for surgery in mid May. The surgery would rule Carlisle out for the rest of the season, and the Saint ultimately chose to retire at just 29 years of age at the completion of the season.

In 2024, Jake was named at Number 98 in Don The Stat's Top 100 Essendon players since 1980.

== Personal life ==
Carlisle grew up in Craigieburn, a northern suburb of Melbourne. He is the second youngest of five children and has four sisters. He attended Willmott Park Primary School in Craigieburn before going to Niddrie Secondary College.

Carlisle has several tattoos. He has an ambigram tattoo of "mother" and "Darlene" on his arm, "Carlisle" on the right side of his back and his sisters' names on his ribs.

== Controversy ==
Carlisle drew controversy when the Nine Network's television program A Current Affair broadcast footage on 21 October 2015, the same day he was traded to St Kilda, of a man suspected to be Carlisle snorting a white substance. A statement released the following morning by Carlisle confirmed it was him in the footage and he admitted that he had "made a very poor decision" and was "truly sorry". In November, he received a strike under the AFL illicit drugs policy, a two-match suspension for the start of the 2016 season (which was served concurrently with his season-long ban arising from the supplements scandal), and forfeited $50,000 in marketing money.

== Statistics ==
Statistics are correct to the end of the 2019 season

Legend
G	Goals	K	Kicks	D	Disposals	T	Tackles
B	Behinds	H	Handballs	M	Marks

Season	Team	No.	Games	Totals							Averages (per game)						
Season	Team	No.	Games	G	B	K	H	D	M	T	G	B	K	H	D	M	T
2010	Essendon	22	3	2	2	16	14	30	20	1	0.7	0.7	5.3	4.7	10.0	6.7	0.3
2011	Essendon	22	7	3	0	56	44	100	45	19	0.4	0.0	8.0	6.3	14.3	6.4	2.7
2012	Essendon	22	18	2	4	134	94	228	83	38	0.1	0.2	7.4	5.2	12.7	4.6	2.1
2013	Essendon	22	21	6	3	205	98	303	141	37	0.3	0.1	9.8	4.7	14.4	6.7	1.8
2014	Essendon	22	19	27	17	166	80	246	121	38	1.4	0.9	8.7	4.2	13.0	6.4	2.0
2015	Essendon	22	17	14	13	143	76	219	109	31	0.8	0.8	8.4	4.5	12.9	6.4	1.8
2016	St Kilda	2	0	—	—	—	—	—	—	—	—	—	—	—	—	—	—
2017	St Kilda	2	22	5	1	202	115	317	131	32	—	—	—	—	—	—	—
2018	St Kilda	2	17	1	3	167	116	283	133	20	—	—	—	—	—	—	—
2019	St Kilda	2	10	1	1	84	32	116	57	7	0.10	0.10	8.40	3.20	11.60	5.70	0.7
2020 (Note: The 2020 season was played with 17 home-and-away matches per team (down from 22) and 16-minute quarters with time on (down from 20-minute quarters with time on) due to the impact of the COVID-19 pandemic.)	St Kilda	2	13	0	0	107	39	146	73	17	0	0	8.23	3.0	11.23	5.62	1.31
Career			147	61	44	1280	708	1988	913	240	0.41	0.3	8.71	4.82	13.52	6.21	1.63
