= Sam Lonergan =

Australian rules footballer

Personal information
- Full name: Sam Lonergan
- Born: 26 March 1987 (age 39); Launceston, Tasmania
- Original teams: Launceston (TSL); Tassie Mariners (TAC Cup); Tasmanian Devils (VFL)
- Draft: 50th overall, 2005; Essendon
- Height: 182 cm (6 ft 0 in)
- Weight: 81 kg (179 lb)
- Position: Forward/Midfielder

Playing career^{1}
Years	Club	Games (Goals)
2006–2012	Essendon	79 (39)
2013	Richmond	2 (0)
Total		81 (39)
- ^{1} Playing statistics correct to the end of 2013.

Sam Lonergan (born 26 March 1987) is a former professional Australian rules footballer who played for the Essendon Football Club and Richmond Football Club in the Australian Football League (AFL). He was drafted from the Launceston Football Club, via the Tassie Mariners U18s and the Tasmanian Devils, with selection 50 in the 2005 Draft.

Lonergan captained the Allies (a composite team drawn from Tasmania, New South Wales, Queensland, the Australian Capital Territory and the Northern Territory), against Victoria during Grand Final week. In that game, he kicked five goals and was the leading possession winner on the ground. He also became the first player in the history of the Tassie Mariners U18s to win successive best and fairest awards. He also played eight games in 2005 for the Tasmanian Devils Football Club in the VFL competition.

Lonergan was chosen as Tasmania's most valuable player at the under-18 championships in 2005, and won the Tassie Mariners U18 Best & Fairest award that same year. He was also chosen in the under-18 All-Australian side.

After a 2012 season where he played 14 games and broke the shoulder blade of Andrew Carrazzo; he was delisted by the Essendon Football Club on 30 October 2012.

Lonergan was picked up by Richmond in the 2012 Rookie draft, played two games for the club in 2013 and retired at the end of that year. Lonergan also supported Richmond while growing up.

In October 2015, Sam was appointed Senior Playing Coach of the Launceston Football Club returning to his home state and his junior club, where he played the majority of his junior football. Sam's original junior club – Tamar Cats – were based near his home town of Beauty Point.

Lonergan, along with 33 other Essendon players, was found guilty of using a banned performance-enhancing substance, thymosin beta-4, as part of Essendon's sports supplements program during the 2012 season. He and his teammates were initially found not guilty in March 2015 by the AFL Anti-Doping Tribunal, but a guilty verdict was returned in January 2016 after an appeal by the World Anti-Doping Agency. He was suspended for two years which, with backdating, ended in November 2016; as a result, he served approximately fourteen months of his suspension and missed the entire 2016 TSL season. He returned to Launceston as playing coach after his suspension.

In 2020 Lonergan became an assistant coach at the Richmond Football Club focusing on midfield development for 1-4 year players.

He is the uncle of Gold Coast's Jesse Lonergan.

== Statistics ==
Statistics are correct to end of 2012 season

Legend
G	Goals	K	Kicks	D	Disposals	T	Tackles
B	Behinds	H	Handballs	M	Marks

Season	Team	No.	Games	Totals							Averages (per game)						
Season	Team	No.	Games	G	B	K	H	D	M	T	G	B	K	H	D	M	T
2006	Essendon	36	1	0	0	2	2	4	1	5	0.0	0.0	2.0	2.0	4.0	1.0	5.0
2007	Essendon	36	0	0	0	0	0	0	0	0	0	0	0	0	0	0	0
2008	Essendon	36	19	9	6	134	149	283	41	73	0.5	0.3	7.0	7.8	14.9	2.2	3.8
2009	Essendon	14	17	10	11	103	143	246	57	62	0.6	0.6	6.1	8.4	14.5	3.4	3.6
2010	Essendon	14	16	10	7	107	134	241	31	68	0.6	0.4	6.7	8.4	15.1	1.9	4.2
2011	Essendon	14	12	4	1	125	85	210	20	39	0.3	0.1	10.4	7.1	17.5	1.7	3.2
2012	Essendon	14	14	6	2	107	103	210	29	74	0.4	0.1	7.6	7.4	15.0	2.1	5.3
Career			79	39	27	578	616	1194	179	321	0.5	0.3	7.3	7.8	15.1	2.3	4.1
