= Jay Neagle =

Australian rules footballer (born 1988)

Personal information
- Full name: Jay Neagle
- Born: 17 January 1988 (age 38)
- Original team: Gippsland Power (TAC Cup)
- Draft: No. 39 (F/S), 2005 national draft
- Height: 191 cm (6 ft 3 in)
- Weight: 100 kg (220 lb)
- Position: Key forward

Playing career^{1}
Years	Club	Games (Goals)
2007–2010	Essendon	28 (41)
- ^{1} Playing statistics correct to the end of 2010.

Jay Neagle (born 17 January 1988) is an Australian rules footballer formerly with the Essendon Football Club in the Australian Football League (AFL).

The son of former Bomber Merv Neagle, Jay was drafted under the father–son rule at the end of the 2005 AFL season.

In his first season, Neagle suffered a number of injury setbacks, primarily with his ankles.

Neagle played his first game of the 2007 season in Round 22, which was also Kevin Sheedy's last game as coach of Essendon and James Hird's last game as a player. Despite lacking in fitness, Neagle was very impressive with his leading and marking and kicked his first senior AFL goal.

2008 saw Neagle develop rapidly. Despite missing large amounts of the pre-season and still having problems with his ankles, he appeared seven times in the Essendon senior side and kicked 10 goals, including three against West Coast and two against both Carlton and Port Adelaide. His accurate goal kicking and strength in marking contests became a feature of his playing style.

On 8 October 2011, Neagle was officially delisted by Essendon.
