= Courtenay Dempsey =

Australian rules footballer

Personal information
- Full name: Courtenay Dempsey
- Born: 28 August 1987 (age 39); Mount Isa, Queensland
- Original team: Morningside (NEAFL)
- Draft: No. 19, 2005 national draft
- Height: 187 cm (6 ft 2 in)
- Weight: 84 kg (185 lb)
- Position: Defender

Playing career^{1}
Years	Club	Games (Goals)
2006–2016	Essendon	133 (35)
- ^{1} Playing statistics correct to the end of 2016.

Courtenay Dempsey (born 28 August 1987) is a former professional Australian rules footballer who played for the Essendon Football Club in the Australian Football League (AFL).

In 2024, Dempsey was named at Number 94 in Don The Stat’s Top 100 Essendon Players since 1980.

== Early life ==
Dempsey was born in Mount Isa and has Indigenous Australian heritage and his ancestry can be traced to the Kalkadoon, a tribe from Queensland's South/Central West region.

Dempsey's first sport was rugby league which he played as a junior before trying Aussie Rules in Cairns.

He played with the Manunda Hawks in the AFL Cairns competition. He later moved to Brisbane to play with the Kenmore Bears junior football club while also playing for his school Brisbane Boys' College.

== AFL career ==
Dempsey's professional footballing career has been dogged by injuries. In 2008 he suffered a leg stress fracture and in 2011 he tore his knee anterior cruciate ligament (ACL) in round four and needed a knee reconstruction.

In May 2013, he was suspended from the main playing group for breaching team rules, and was forced to train with the VFL team. In August, he tore his hamstring tendon and missed the remainder of the season.

At the conclusion of the 2016 season, he was delisted by Essendon.

== Statistics ==
Legend
G	Goals	K	Kicks	D	Disposals	T	Tackles
B	Behinds	H	Handballs	M	Marks

Season	Team	No.	Games	Totals							Averages (per game)						
Season	Team	No.	Games	G	B	K	H	D	M	T	G	B	K	H	D	M	T
2006	Essendon	15	5	1	0	23	21	44	16	5	0.2	0.0	4.6	4.2	8.8	3.2	1.0
2007	Essendon	15	1	1	1	7	5	12	1	1	1.0	1.0	7.0	5.0	12.0	1.0	1.0
2008	Essendon	15	4	1	1	23	29	52	12	6	0.2	0.2	5.8	7.2	13.0	3.0	1.5
2009	Essendon	15	20	7	6	150	169	319	69	46	0.4	0.3	7.5	8.4	16.0	3.4	2.3
2010	Essendon	15	20	3	8	201	158	359	85	73	0.2	0.4	10.0	7.9	18.0	4.2	3.6
2011	Essendon	15	4	0	0	26	24	50	13	10	0.0	0.0	6.5	6.0	12.5	3.2	2.5
2012	Essendon	15	20	4	0	238	124	362	106	62	0.2	0.0	11.9	6.2	18.1	5.3	3.1
2013	Essendon	15	14	7	3	187	69	256	71	40	0.5	0.2	13.4	4.9	18.3	5.1	2.9
2014	Essendon	15	18	2	3	162	119	281	67	57	0.1	0.2	9.0	6.6	15.6	3.7	3.2
2015	Essendon	15	13	5	7	111	61	172	46	25	0.4	0.5	8.5	4.7	13.2	3.5	1.9
2016	Essendon	15	14	4	6	159	63	222	63	24	0.3	0.4	11.4	4.5	15.9	4.5	1.7
Career			133	35	35	1287	842	2129	549	349	0.3	0.3	9.7	6.3	16.0	4.1	2.6
