= Heath Hocking =

Australian rules footballer

Personal information
- Full name: Heath Hocking
- Born: 27 December 1987 (age 38)
- Original team: Eastern Ranges (TAC Cup)
- Draft: No. 20, 2006 rookie draft
- Height: 186 cm (6 ft 1 in)
- Weight: 90 kg (198 lb)
- Position: Midfielder

Playing career
Years	Club	Games (Goals)
2006–2017	Essendon	126 (45)

Heath Hocking (born 27 December 1987) is a former professional Australian rules footballer who played for the Essendon Football Club in the Australian Football League (AFL).

Originally from Mooroolbark, he was drafted by Essendon with the 20th selection in the 2006 rookie draft from Eastern Ranges in TAC Cup. He was elevated to the main list in 2007, playing one game late in the 2007 season.

Hocking is a solid and hard-at-it midfielder, who primarily plays a defensive tagging role on opposition midfielders. He finished second in the Essendon's best and fairest award, the Crichton Medal, in 2010 and fifth in 2011.

His father, Graham Hocking played one game for South Melbourne in 1971 and his older brother Evan has played in the Victorian Football League for Port Melbourne Football Club.

Hocking, along with 33 other Essendon players, was found guilty of using a banned performance-enhancing substance, thymosin beta-4, as part of Essendon's sports supplements program during the 2012 season. He and his teammates were initially found not guilty in March 2015 by the AFL Anti-Doping Tribunal, but a guilty verdict was returned in January 2016 after an appeal by the World Anti-Doping Agency. He was suspended for two years which, with backdating, ended in November 2016; as a result, he served approximately fourteen months of his suspension and missed the entire 2016 AFL season.

With the retirements of Jobe Watson and Brent Stanton at the end of the 2017 AFL season, Hocking was the last player remaining on the Essendon playing list to be coached by Kevin Sheedy until he was delisted in September 2017.

In 2022, Hocking was enticed back to his former junior club where his Mooroolbark team was defeated in the Division One Eastern FNL Grand Final.

Hocking has also taken to ultra-running and finished second in the 12 hour run section of the 2023 Coburg 24 Hour Carnival.

In 2024, Hocking was named at Number 96 in Don The Stat's Countdown of the Top 100 Essendon Players since 1980.

In 2024, Hocking became an ambassador for the Epilepsy Foundation of Australia, following his son's experience with infantile spasms. He has completed various fundraising initiatives for the Foundation, including a 24-hour non-stop run around the park and 200km non-stop on a Treadmill, both as part of Walk for Epilepsy.
