= Tom Bellchambers =

Australian rules footballer

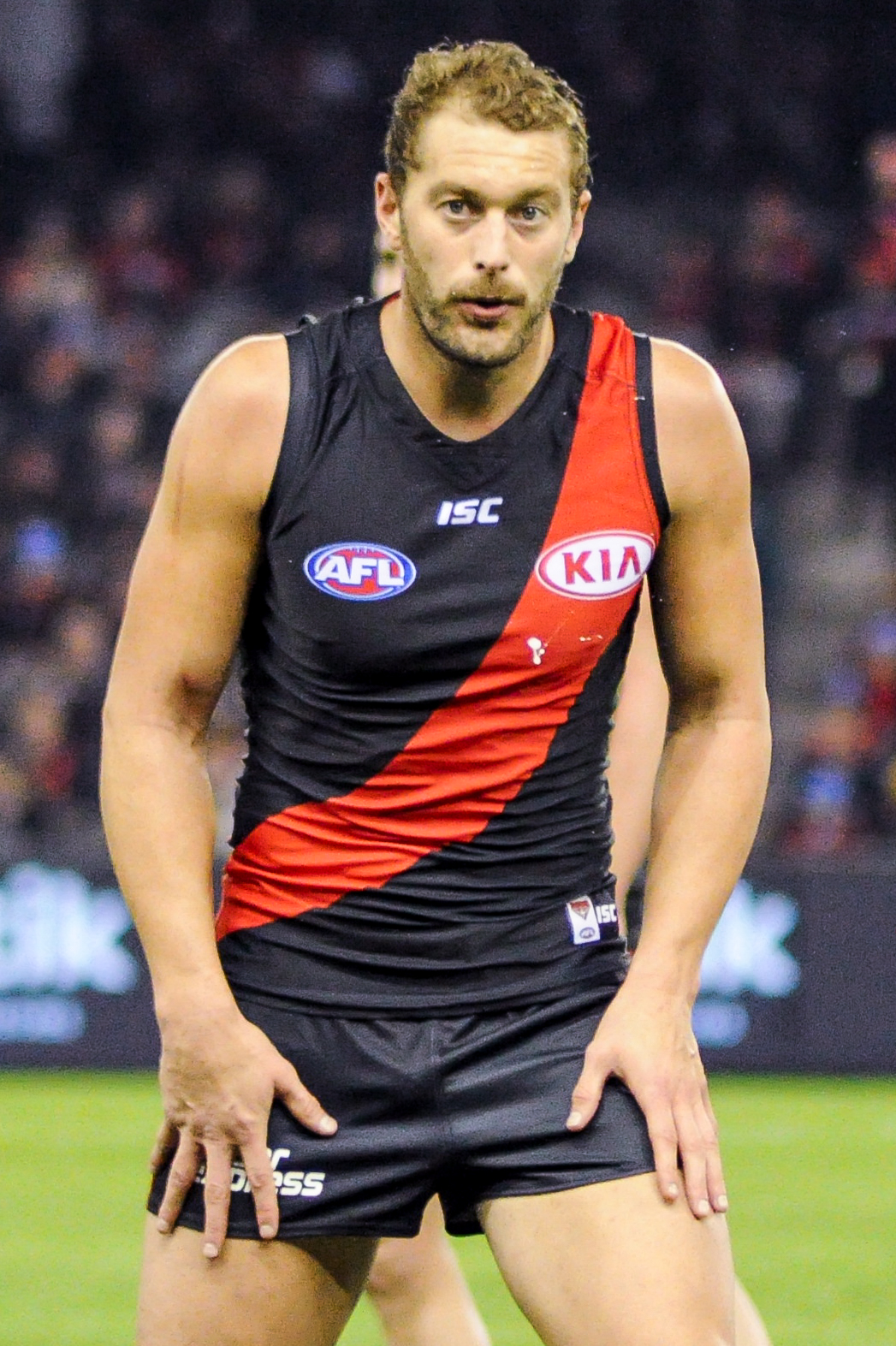
- Bellchambers playing for Essendon in June 2017

Personal information
- Full name: Thomas Bellchambers
- Born: 9 July 1989 (age 37); Launceston, Tasmania
- Original team: Tasmanian Devils (TAC Cup)
- Draft: No. 8, 2007 pre-season draft
- Height: 201 cm (6 ft 7 in)
- Weight: 108 kg (238 lb)
- Position: Ruckman / Forward

Playing career
Years	Club	Games (Goals)
2008–2020	Essendon	136 (77)

Thomas Bellchambers (born 9 July 1989) is a former professional Australian rules footballer who played for the Essendon Football Club in the Australian Football League (AFL). He is a current professional boxer. After playing for the Tasmanian Devils in the TAC Cup, he was drafted with pick 8 in the 2007 pre-season draft. He made his debut against Hawthorn in Round 11 of the 2008 AFL season. He announced his retirement from the AFL on the 15th of September 2020.

Bellchambers, along with 33 other Essendon players, was found guilty of using a banned performance-enhancing substance, thymosin beta-4, as part of Essendon's sports supplements program during the 2012 season. He and his team-mates were initially found not guilty in March 2015 by the AFL Anti-Doping Tribunal, but a guilty verdict was returned in January 2016 after an appeal by the World Anti-Doping Agency. He was suspended for two years which, with backdating, ended in November 2016; as a result, he served approximately fourteen months of his suspension and missed the entire 2016 AFL season.

He announced his retirement on 15 September 2020, after 136 games.

On 24/05/23 Bellchambers made his professional boxing debut Vs Cameron Mooney in Melbourne, Bellchambers won by KO in the 3rd round. The fight was in the heavyweight division.

Bellchambers professional boxing record is 1-0. (1 by KO)

== Statistics ==
Legend
G	Goals	K	Kicks	D	Disposals	T	Tackles
B	Behinds	H	Handballs	M	Marks

Season	Team	No.	Games	Totals							Averages (per game)						
Season	Team	No.	Games	G	B	K	H	D	M	T	G	B	K	H	D	M	T
2008	Essendon	44	3	0	0	7	17	24	8	6	0.0	0.0	2.3	5.7	8.0	2.7	2.0
2009	Essendon	44	6	1	2	11	25	36	15	8	0.2	0.3	1.8	4.2	6.0	2.5	1.3
2010	Essendon	44	5	1	2	21	24	45	23	8	0.2	0.4	4.2	4.8	9.0	4.6	1.6
2011	Essendon	44	13	8	2	68	72	140	44	18	0.6	0.2	5.2	5.5	10.8	3.4	1.4
2012	Essendon	44	16	10	10	113	73	186	77	21	0.6	0.6	7.1	4.6	11.6	4.8	1.3
2013	Essendon	2	18	28	11	113	72	185	72	23	1.6	0.6	6.3	4.0	10.3	4.0	1.3
2014	Essendon	2	8	3	5	41	33	74	29	14	0.4	0.6	5.1	4.1	9.2	3.6	1.8
2015	Essendon	2	10	2	2	52	46	98	36	15	0.2	0.2	5.2	4.6	9.8	3.6	1.5
2017	Essendon	2	14	9	4	86	65	151	55	38	0.6	0.3	6.2	4.6	10.8	3.9	2.7
2018	Essendon	2	20	8	8	138	91	229	74	29	0.4	0.4	6.9	4.6	11.5	3.7	1.5
2019	Essendon	2	16	6	4	105	75	180	52	30	0.4	0.3	6.6	4.7	11.3	3.3	1.9
2020	Essendon	2	7	1	0	31	11	42	10	10	0.6	0.0	4.4	1.6	6.0	1.4	1.4
Career			136	77	50	786	604	1390	495	221	0.6	0.4	5.8	4.4	10.2	3.6	1.6
