= Leroy Jetta =

Australian rules footballer (born 1988)

Personal information
- Full name: Leroy Jetta
- Born: 6 July 1988 (age 38); Pingelly, Western Australia
- Original team: South Fremantle (WAFL)
- Draft: No. 18 (PP), 2006 National Draft, Essendon
- Height: 177 cm (5 ft 10 in)
- Weight: 75 kg (165 lb)
- Position: Forward

Playing career^{1}
Years	Club	Games (Goals)
2007–2014	Essendon	93 (80)
- ^{1} Playing statistics correct to the end of 2014.

Career highlights
- 2004 Kevin Sheehan Medallist; 2005 Under 18 All-Australian; 2006 Under 18 All-Australian; Peel Thunder leading goal kicker 2015; Peel Thunder premiership side 2017; Coolbellup premiership side 2020; Beat the Jets 14.14(98)-4.4(28)

Leroy Jetta (born 6 July 1988) is an Australian rules footballer, who played with the Essendon Football Club in the Australian Football League.

== Career ==
An outstanding junior excluding one occasion where he was tagged out of the game by Martin Davis (now West Coast Eagles Property manager), Jetta was twice named in the Under 18 All-Australian Team as well as being adjudged the joint winner of the Kevin Sheehan Medal, awarded to the Best Player in Division 1 at the Under 16 National Championships. He was also a graduate of the AIS-AFL Academy in 2005.

The speedy forward was drafted by the Bombers with the priority selection (18th overall) in the 2006 AFL draft from South Fremantle. He was drafted as a player renowned for outstanding pace, good foot skill and terrific vision on the ground. He made his AFL debut in the opening round of the 2007 season, along with another of the club's 2006 recruits, Alwyn Davey. Jetta went on to play the following 3 matches before being sidelined by a groin complaint. Despite returning to play with Essendon's VFL affiliate, the Bendigo Bombers, this injury ultimately ended his 2007 season.

The 2008 pre-season, saw Jetta return to the club in excellent condition. He equaled the then club record for the 20m sprint with a time of 2.75 seconds, and his skin folds were the lowest they had been. His strong performances in the NAB Cup reflected that increase in fitness. As a result of that good form, Jetta earned selection in Essendon's Round 1 encounter with North Melbourne in which he gathered 13 possessions and showcased his terrific tackling. His good start to the season was interrupted by a hamstring injury sustained in Essendon's round 3 clash with Carlton. He returned in round 7, but had a subsequent dip in form. However, Essendon coach, Matthew Knights, persisted with Jetta and was paid back by his outstanding performance against Fremantle in round 14.

The 2009 season was another important year in Jetta's development. A few quiet performances in the pre-season led to his omission from the side for the opening two rounds of the season. However, strong form for the Bendigo Bombers led to a recall for Essendon's vital round 3 encounter with Carlton.

On 7 September 2014, Jetta parted ways with Essendon after eight seasons with the club.

Jetta, along with 33 other Essendon players, was found guilty of using a banned performance-enhancing substance, thymosin beta-4, as part of Essendon's sports supplements program during the 2012 season. He and his teammates were initially found not guilty in March 2015 by the AFL Anti-Doping Tribunal, but a guilty verdict was returned in January 2016 after an appeal by the World Anti-Doping Agency. He was suspended for two years which, with backdating, ended in February 2017; as a result, he served approximately seventeen months of his suspension and missed the entire 2016 WAFL season and parts of the 2015/16 and 2016/17 NTFL seasons.

He later played with Peel Thunder in the WAFL and played for Pinjarra in the WA Amateur Football League in 2018.

== Statistics ==
Statistics are correct to end of the 2012 season.

Season	Team	#	Games	G	B	K	H	D	M	T	G	B	K	H	D	M	T
Season	Team	#	Totals								Averages (per game)						
2007	Essendon	7	4	3	1	16	10	26	9	7	0.8	0.2	4.0	2.5	6.5	2.2	1.8
2008	Essendon	7	18	11	9	98	68	166	26	54	0.6	0.5	5.4	3.8	9.2	1.4	3.0
2009	Essendon	7	6	1	3	35	38	73	12	15	0.2	0.5	5.8	6.3	12.2	2.0	2.5
2010	Essendon	7	11	9	9	93	97	190	38	43	0.8	0.8	8.4	8.8	17.3	3.4	3.9
2011	Essendon	7	23	27	9	196	151	347	57	88	1.2	0.4	8.5	6.6	15.1	2.5	3.8
2012	Essendon	7	21	22	22	178	120	298	61	67	1.0	1.0	8.5	5.7	14.2	2.9	3.2
Career			83	73	53	616	484	1100	203	274	0.9	0.6	7.4	5.8	13.3	2.4	3.3

Legend
G	Goals	K	Kicks	D	Disposals	T	Tackles
B	Behinds	H	Handballs	M	Marks
