= David Myers (Australian footballer) =

Australian rules footballer (born 1989)

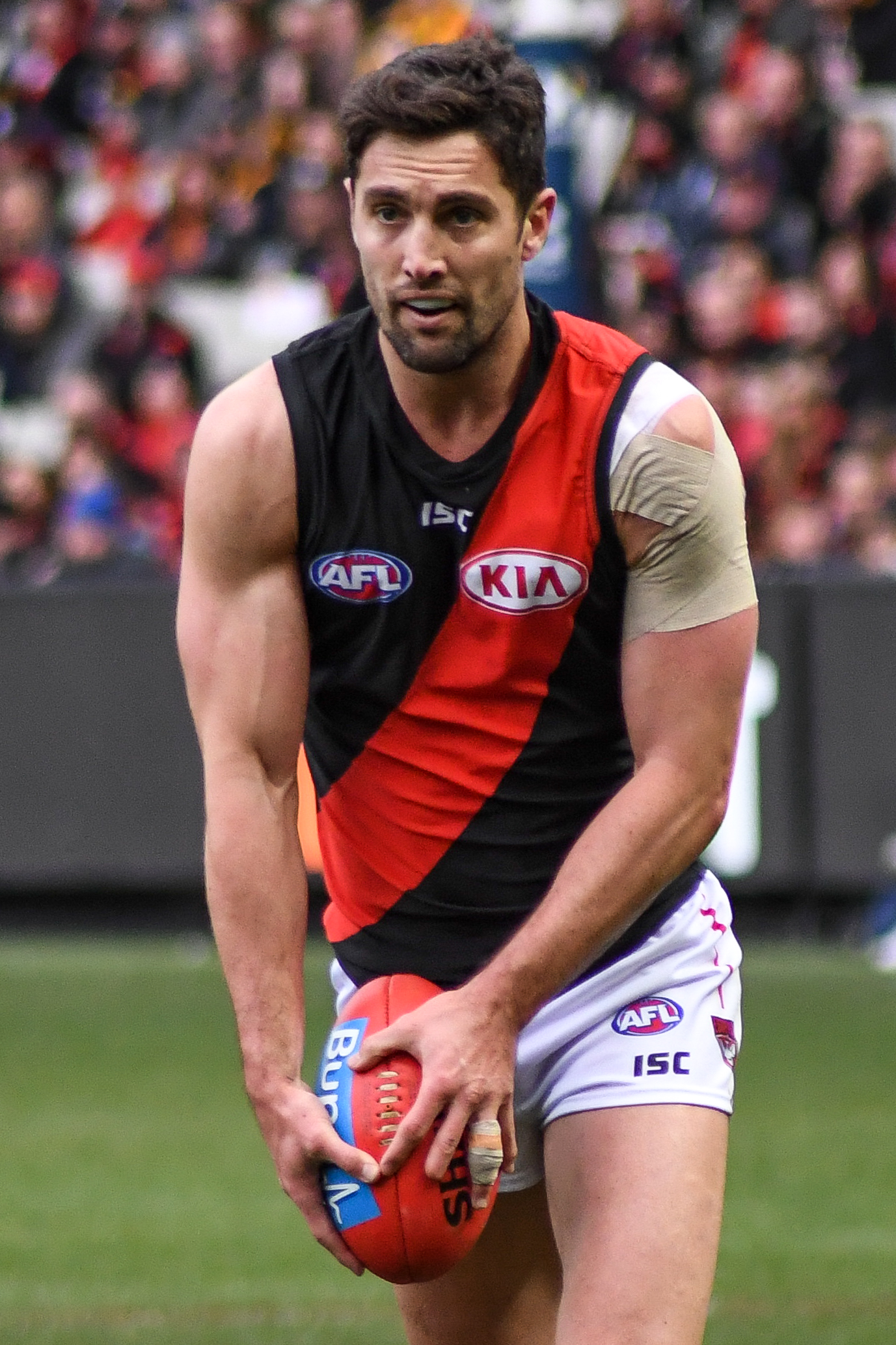
- Myers playing for Essendon in August 2018

Personal information
- Full name: David Myers
- Born: 30 June 1989 (age 37)
- Original team: Perth (WAFL)
- Draft: No. 6, 2007 national draft
- Height: 191 cm (6 ft 3 in)
- Weight: 89 kg (196 lb)
- Position: Midfielder

Playing career^{1}
Years	Club	Games (Goals)
2008-2019	Essendon	123 (40)
- ^{1} Playing statistics correct to the end of 2019.

David Myers (born 30 June 1989) is a former professional Australian rules footballer who played for the Essendon Football Club in the Australian Football League (AFL).

== AFL career ==
Myers is originally from Perth in the WAFL, he also attended Wesley College, Perth.

He was drafted with the 6th overall selection in the 2007 national draft by Essendon.

Myers, along with 33 other Essendon players, was found guilty of using a banned performance-enhancing substance, thymosin beta-4, as part of Essendon's sports supplements program during the 2012 season. He and his team-mates were initially found not guilty in March 2015 by the AFL Anti-Doping Tribunal, but a guilty verdict was returned in January 2016 after an appeal by the World Anti-Doping Agency. He was suspended for two years which, with backdating, ended in November 2016; as a result, he served approximately fourteen months of his suspension and missed the entire 2016 AFL season. The suspension lead to speculation that Myers would exercise his rights as an unrestricted free agent and leave Essendon, but during the year he signed a three-year contract to remain with Essendon until the end of the 2019 season. Myers announced his retirement at the end of the 2019 season with an open letter to the fans.

== Statistics ==
Statistics are correct to end of the 2015 season.

Legend
G	Goals	K	Kicks	D	Disposals	T	Tackles
B	Behinds	H	Handballs	M	Marks

Season	Team	No.	Games	Totals							Averages (per game)						
Season	Team	No.	Games	G	B	K	H	D	M	T	G	B	K	H	D	M	T
2008	Essendon	23	8	1	0	77	39	116	29	24	0.1	0.0	9.6	4.9	14.5	3.6	3.0
2009	Essendon	23	6	1	3	37	29	66	19	8	0.2	0.5	6.2	4.8	11.0	3.2	1.3
2010	Essendon	23	8	3	3	71	62	133	27	24	0.4	0.4	8.9	7.8	16.6	3.4	3.0
2011	Essendon	23	14	2	4	155	111	266	56	31	0.1	0.3	11.1	7.9	19.0	4.0	2.2
2012	Essendon	23	9	4	4	102	54	156	32	18	0.4	0.4	11.3	6.0	17.3	3.6	2.0
2013	Essendon	23	20	10	10	220	147	367	86	68	0.5	0.5	11.0	7.4	18.4	4.3	3.4
2014	Essendon	23	18	5	7	209	168	377	64	75	0.3	0.4	11.6	9.3	20.9	3.6	4.2
2015	Essendon	23	2	0	0	15	8	23	5	0	0.0	0.0	7.5	4.0	11.5	2.5	0.0
2016	Essendon	23	0	0	0	0	0	0	0	0	0.0	0.0	0	0	0	0	0.0
2017	Essendon	23	15	3	6	129	147	276	41	39	0.2	0.4	8.6	9.8	18.4	2.7	2.6
2018	Essendon	23	16	10	5	182	147	329	53	61	0.6	0.3	11.4	9.2	20.6	3.3	3.8
2019	Essendon	23	6	1	2	45	48	93	12	17	0.2	0.3	7.5	8.0	15.5	2.0	2.8
Career			122	40	44	1242	960	2202	424	365	0.3	0.4	10.2	7.9	18.0	3.5	3.0

Did not play in 2016 as he was one of the seventeen still-active AFL players who missed the 2016 season as a result of the Essendon Football Club supplements saga investigation.
