= Michael Quinn (footballer) =

Australian rules footballer (born 1990)

Personal information
- Native name: Micheál Ó Cuinn (Irish)
- Born: 26 January 1990 (age 36) County Longford, Ireland
- Height: 1.85 m (6 ft 1 in)

Sport
- Sport: Gaelic football
- Position: Centre Back
Club
- Years: Club
- 2007-: Killoe Young Emmets
Club titles
- Longford titles: 6
Inter-county
- Years: County
- 2012-: Longford

Michael Quinn (born 26 January 1990) is a Gaelic footballer for the Killoe Young Emmets club and the Longford county team. He is also a former professional Australian rules footballer with Essendon Football Club in the Australian Football League (AFL).

Quinn is notable as holding the record for the quickest conversion of a former GAA player to play in the AFL, taking the record from Martin Clarke and having made his AFL debut just weeks after arriving in Australia.

== Early life ==
Quinn went to primary school in Scoil Mhuire, Newtownforbes. He grew up in Killoe, County Longford. He plays Gaelic football with the Killoe Young Emmets, and made his Club Senior Championship debut in 2008, where he helped his club reach the Longford Senior Championship semi final. In addition he also played for the Longford minor team in the Leinster Minor Championship in the same year, reaching the Leinster semi final.

In August 2008, Quinn arrived in Melbourne for a two-week trial with Essendon. After impressing talent scouts he returned to Ireland but was invited to return to Australia in November to be signed as an international rookie on 16 November.

== AFL career ==
Michael Quinn

Personal information
- Full name: Michael Quinn
- Born: 26 January 1990 (age 36); County Longford, Ireland
- Original team: Longford (Gaelic football)
- Draft: International rookie Essendon; 64th overall, 2008
- Height: 185 cm (6 ft 1 in)
- Weight: 77 kg (170 lb)

Playing career^{1}
Years	Club	Games (Goals)
2009–2011	Essendon	8 (2)
- ^{1} Playing statistics correct to the end of 2011.

Initially expected to be groomed through the Victorian Football League affiliate the Bendigo Bombers, Quinn showed prodigious progress with the oval ball, with a standout performance in an early intra-club match. After the match, Matthew Knights insisted on Quinn training with the senior side. His form saw him selected into the Essendon side for the 2009 NAB Cup in a match initially scheduled to be played in Darwin, Northern Territory but was moved to Melbourne to become a tribute match for the Black Saturday bushfires. Quinn's Australian host family had already made travel plans and took him to Darwin in the run up to his debut match.

There he impressed enough with his pace, evasive skills and ability to earn possessions to be elevated to the senior list in place of injured Scott Gumbleton on 2 April and selected in the senior side for round 2 of the premiership season.

His debut was considered a standout for an Irish convert by football and media commentators, racking up 20 possessions, including 8 kicks, 12 handballs and 4 marks. Former Irish Australian rules footballer Jim Stynes described the debut as "phenomenal" and that he believed that Quinn will "hopefully have a long career" in the AFL.

== Gaelic football career ==
In 2012 Quinn returned to Ireland and joined up with the Longford county team. Having won the National Football League Division 4 title in 2011, Longford played in Division 3 the following year and went on to win the National Football League Division 3 title with a win over Wexford with Quinn playing at centre back in the final. Quinn captained the Longford senior football team from 2020 to 2022. He was nominated for an All Star award in 2012, won a Sigerson Cup with DCU in 2014/15 season and was capped in the International Rules Series in 2015. Since his return in 2012, Quinn has won six Longford Senior Football Championship titles with his club Killoe Young Emmets in 2012, 2014, 2015, 2019, 2020 and 2023, captaining the winning side in 2015. He also won three Longford Senior League titles (Leader Cup) with Killoe Young Emmets in 2012, 2014 and 2015.
