= Kyle Reimers =

Australian rules footballer

Personal information
- Full name: Kyle Reimers
- Born: 10 January 1989 (age 37)
- Original team: Peel Thunder
- Draft: No. 47, 2006 National Draft, Essendon
- Height: 182 cm (6 ft 0 in)
- Weight: 85 kg (187 lb)
- Position: Forward

Playing career^{1}
| Years | Club | Games (Goals) |
| 2007–2012 | Essendon | 60 (69) |
- ^{1} Playing statistics correct to the end of 2012.

Career highlights
- 2008 AFL Rising Star nominee

Kyle Reimers (born 10 January 1989) is a former Australian rules footballer, who played with Essendon in the AFL. Debuting in 2007, Reimers was pick number 47 in the 2006 AFL draft, having played with Peel Thunder in the WAFL. He played for Western Australia in the 2005 U-16 Championships and the 2006 U-18 Championships.

Wearing the guernsey number 37, Reimers was an exciting developing player from 2008 onwards, winning the club rising star award for that year on the back of a NAB AFL Rising Star Nomination in round 16 against Richmond. Reimers' career highlight was kicking eight goals in Essendon's 139 point win over the Gold Coast Suns in Round 6 of 2011. Reimers was de-listed at the end of 2012 and turned down an offer to train with Carlton in 2013.

During the Essendon Football Club supplements saga Reimers claimed that the players were asked to sign waivers and were injected with supplements that were "pushing the boundaries".

== Post-AFL career ==
Kyle Reimers played for Perth Football Club in the W.A.F.L. in Season 2013 and in February 2014 returned to Victoria and was signed by Aberfeldie Football Club in the Essendon District Football League.

== Statistics ==
Statistics are correct to end 2012 season.

| Season | Team | No. | Games | Totals | | | | | | | Averages (per game) | | | | | | |
| Season | Team | No. | Games | G | B | K | H | D | M | T | G | B | K | H | D | M | T |
|---|---|---|---|---|---|---|---|---|---|---|---|---|---|---|---|---|---|
| 2007 | Essendon | 37 | 3 | 1 | 1 | 15 | 9 | 24 | 11 | 4 | 0.3 | 0.3 | 5.0 | 3.0 | 8.0 | 3.7 | 1.3 |
| 2008 | Essendon | 37 | 15 | 13 | 10 | 160 | 63 | 223 | 70 | 36 | 0.9 | 0.7 | 10.7 | 4.2 | 14.9 | 4.7 | 2.4 |
| 2009 | Essendon | 37 | 9 | 9 | 8 | 89 | 51 | 140 | 34 | 25 | 1.0 | 0.9 | 9.9 | 5.7 | 15.6 | 3.8 | 2.8 |
| 2010 | Essendon | 37 | 13 | 13 | 9 | 129 | 77 | 206 | 55 | 34 | 1.0 | 0.7 | 9.9 | 5.9 | 15.8 | 4.2 | 2.6 |
| 2011 | Essendon | 37 | 15 | 27 | 17 | 120 | 40 | 160 | 45 | 40 | 1.8 | 1.1 | 8.0 | 2.7 | 10.7 | 3.0 | 2.7 |
| 2012 | Essendon | 37 | 5 | 6 | 5 | 41 | 9 | 50 | 21 | 12 | 1.2 | 1.0 | 8.2 | 1.8 | 10.0 | 4.2 | 2.4 |
| Career | | | 60 | 69 | 50 | 554 | 249 | 803 | 236 | 151 | 1.2 | 0.8 | 9.2 | 4.2 | 13.4 | 3.9 | 2.5 |

Legend
| G | Goals | K | Kicks | D | Disposals | T | Tackles |
| B | Behinds | H | Handballs | M | Marks |
