= Cale Hooker =

Australian rules footballer (born 1988)

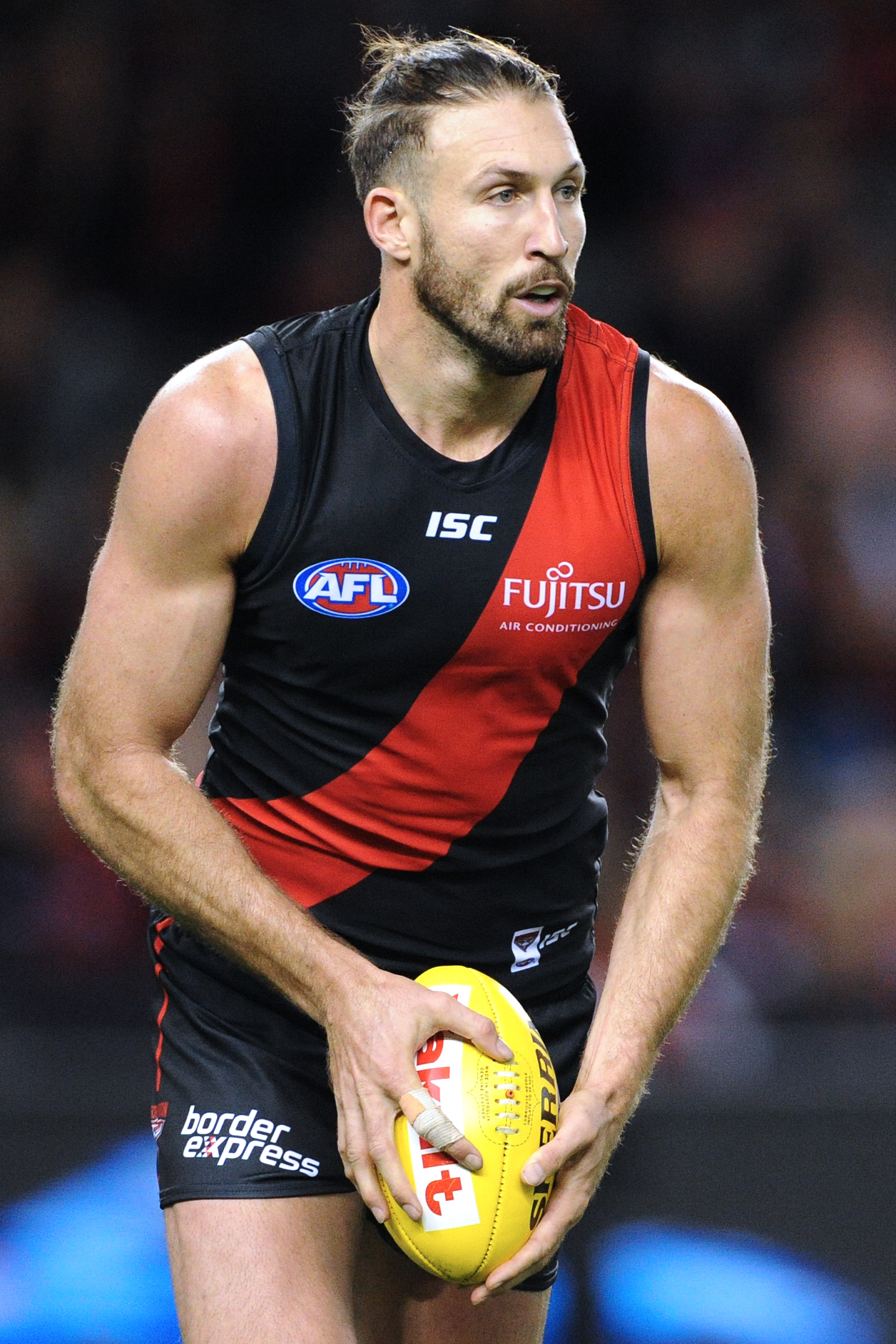
- Hooker playing for Essendon in 2018.

Personal information
- Full name: Cale Hooker
- Born: 13 October 1988 (age 38)
- Original team: East Fremantle (WAFL)
- Draft: No. 54, 2007 national draft
- Height: 197 cm (6 ft 6 in)
- Weight: 103 kg (227 lb)
- Position: Key Forward/Defender

Playing career^{1}
Years	Club	Games (Goals)
2008–2021	Essendon	219 (122)
- ^{1} Playing statistics correct to the end of round 22, 2021.

Career highlights
- W. S. Crichton Medal: 2015; All-Australian team: 2014

Cale Hooker (born 13 October 1988) is a former professional Australian rules footballer, who played for the Essendon Football Club in the Australian Football League (AFL).

Hooker graduated from Applecross Senior High School and played for East Fremantle in the WAFL.

Hooker was drafted by the Essendon Football Club with pick 54 in the 2007 national draft and made his debut against the Western Bulldogs in round 21, 2008.

In 2009 and 2010 Hooker established himself as one of the club's key-position defenders. In 2011 Hooker made a good start to the season but tore a hamstring in round 13 and played only one further game for the season. During the trade period after the 2012 season Essendon contemplated trading Hooker to the West Coast Eagles. However, Hooker, who had a year to run on his contract, declined to be traded.

In 2014 Hooker was Essendon's most reliable backman, coming second in the W.S. Crichton Medal and winning All-Australian selection for the first time.

In 2015 Hooker was elevated to Essendon's Leadership Group. He started the year in defence but was switched to the forward line halfway through the season. He became a useful goal scorer and finished the season with 21 goals. He was awarded the W. S. Crichton Medal as Essendon's best and fairest.

Hooker is noted for his marking ability and took in excess of 150 marks in each of 2013, 2014 and 2015.

Hooker, along with 33 other Essendon players, was found guilty of using a banned performance-enhancing substance, thymosin beta-4, as part of Essendon's sports supplements program during the 2012 season. He and his teammates were initially found not guilty in March 2015 by the AFL Anti-Doping Tribunal, but a guilty verdict was returned in January 2016 after an appeal by the World Anti-Doping Agency. He was suspended for two years which, with backdating, ended in November 2016; as a result, he served approximately fourteen months of his suspension and missed the entire 2016 AFL season. The suspension sparked speculation that Hooker would leave Essendon as a free agent, but he signed a new five-year contract with Essendon in April 2016, rejecting larger offers from several other clubs.

On 17 August 2021, Hooker announced that he would retire at the end of this season.

== Statistics ==
Statistics are correct to the end of 2021.

Legend
G	Goals	K	Kicks	D	Disposals	T	Tackles
B	Behinds	H	Handballs	M	Marks

Season	Team	No.	Games	Totals							Averages (per game)						
Season	Team	No.	Games	G	B	K	H	D	M	T	G	B	K	H	D	M	T
2008	Essendon	26	2	0	0	3	17	20	7	1	0.0	0.0	1.5	8.5	10.0	3.5	0.5
2009	Essendon	26	16	3	3	72	173	245	74	53	0.2	0.2	4.5	10.8	15.3	4.6	3.3
2010	Essendon	26	18	2	1	81	174	255	71	39	0.1	0.1	4.5	9.7	14.2	3.9	2.2
2011	Essendon	26	13	0	0	99	99	198	66	20	0.0	0.0	7.6	7.6	15.2	5.1	1.5
2012	Essendon	26	17	0	2	149	125	274	95	28	0.0	0.1	8.8	7.4	16.1	5.6	1.6
2013	Essendon	26	22	2	0	197	198	395	151	44	0.1	0.0	9.0	9.0	18.0	6.9	2.0
2014	Essendon	26	23	0	0	240	182	422	170	35	0.0	0.0	10.4	7.9	18.4	7.4	1.5
2015	Essendon	26	22	21	21	235	154	389	157	49	1.0	1.0	10.7	7.0	17.7	7.1	2.2
2016	Essendon	26	0 (Note: Missed 2016 AFL season due to suspension)	—	—	—	—	—	—	—	—	—	—	—	—	—	—
2017	Essendon	26	20	41	26	155	115	270	139	33	2.1	1.3	7.8	5.8	13.5	7.0	1.7
2018	Essendon	26	22	13	9	191	181	372	155	27	0.6	0.4	8.7	8.2	16.9	7.1	1.2
2019	Essendon	26	18	4	2	178	135	313	135	15	0.2	0.1	9.9	7.5	17.4	7.5	0.8
2020 (Note: The 2020 season was played with 17 home-and-away matches per team (down from 22) and 16-minute quarters with time on (down from 20-minute quarters with time on) due to the impact of the COVID-19 pandemic.)	Essendon	26	8	3	3	43	46	89	37	6	0.4	0.4	5.4	5.8	11.1	4.6	0.8
2021	Essendon	26	18	33	24	106	100	206	65	27	1.8	1.3	5.9	5.6	11.4	3.6	1.5
Career			219	122	91	1749	1699	3448	1322	377	0.6	0.4	8.0	7.8	15.7	6.0	1.7
