= Brent Prismall =

Australian rules footballer (born 1986)

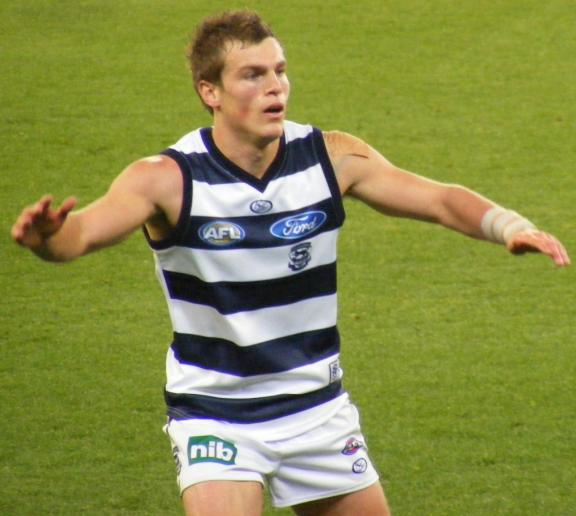
- Prismall with Geelong in 2008

Personal information
- Full name: Brent Prismall
- Born: 14 July 1986 (age 40)
- Original teams: Werribee (VFL); Western Jets (TAC Cup)
- Draft: No. 32, 2004 National Draft, Geelong
- Height: 186 cm (6 ft 1 in)
- Weight: 88 kg (194 lb)

Playing career^{1}
Years	Club	Games (Goals)
2005–2008	Geelong	25 (15)
2009–2011	Essendon	36 (10)
Total		61 (25)
- ^{1} Playing statistics correct to the end of 2012.

Brent Prismall (born 14 July 1986) is a former Australian rules football player for the Geelong Football Club and Essendon Football Club in the Australian Football League (AFL).

== Career ==
=== Early career ===
Prismall grew up in Werribee, Victoria. He was drafted from the Western Jets Under 18s. He was Geelong's first pick in the 2004 draft, pick 32 overall, coincidentally this is the number he wore on his guernsey. The number 32 was made famous by Geelong player Garry Hocking. Prismall spent all of the 2005 season playing in the Victorian Football League (VFL) for Geelong's VFL team.

=== Geelong: 2005–2008 ===
At the start of 2006, he moved out of his Werribee home and moved to Geelong to live with teammates Corey Enright and Henry Playfair, with whom he would later go on to start a personal training organisation. He then set his sights on playing a senior game for Geelong and, after playing in the team that had earlier won the pre-season cup, he was selected to play in round 5. Only minutes into his debut, on 29 April against the Sydney Swans, he broke his arm and only played eight games for the year.

After a solid pre-season, he played the first five games of 2007 before being omitted and then broke his wrist while playing for the Geelong VFL side on 8 July 2007. As a result, Prismall was unable to play for several weeks but recovered in time to play finals for the VFL side.

In 2008, Prismall played in 11 home and away games and was selected to play in the qualifying final against St Kilda on 7 September 2008, which was to be his 25th game and finals debut. However, midway through the first quarter, he was stretchered off and did not return after landing awkwardly and badly injuring his right knee. It was later confirmed that he would have to undergo a full knee reconstruction after scans revealed a ruptured anterior cruciate ligament.

After the 2008 season, Prismall declined the new two-year contract offered to him by Geelong and asked the club to be traded to get a better chance of playing more regularly in the AFL. On the final day of trade week, he was traded to the Essendon Football Club for national draft pick number 39. Essendon recruited Prismall in order to improve their young, developing list. Prismall was given the #9 guernsey which was vacated when Adam Ramanauskus' retired.

=== Essendon: 2008-2012 ===
Prismall returned from injury towards the second half of the 2009 season for the Essendon Bombers and had an injury free return. He played 13 games for the club in 2009 and was a regular contributor, kicking five goals.

In the 2010 season, Prismall was in and out of the Essendon team. His performances were not consistent and his ball skills were lacking. Towards the end of the season, however, his form improved considerably, despite the team's poor performances on the field. After a reconstruction on his right knee in 2008, he injured his left knee in the opening minutes of round 19, 2011 match against Collingwood and was out for the rest of the season.

Prismall was delisted at the end of the 2012 season.

=== Post-AFL career ===
In 2013, Prismall joined the Western Bulldogs. On-field, he played in 2013 for the Bulldogs' VFL affiliate, the Williamstown Seagulls; then, in 2014, when the Bulldogs ended their affiliation with Williamstown, began playing for the club's new reserves team in the VFL. He served in other roles at the football club, including as a runner and as player welfare manager.

Prismall, along with 33 other Essendon players, was found guilty of using a banned performance-enhancing substance, thymosin beta-4, as part of Essendon's sports supplements program during the 2012 season. He and his teammates were initially found not guilty in March 2015 by the AFL Anti-Doping Tribunal, but a guilty verdict was returned in January 2016 after an appeal by the World Anti-Doping Agency. He was suspended for two years which, with backdating, ended in November 2016; as a result, he served approximately fourteen months of his suspension and missed the entire 2016 VFL season and was forced to stand down from his role as player welfare manager.

After 13 years working in player welfare at the Bulldogs, Prismall returned to Essendon ahead of the 2027 AFL season as the club's Head of Development.

== Statistics ==
Statistics are correct to end of 2012 season.

Season	Team	No.	Games	Totals							Averages (per game)						
Season	Team	No.	Games	G	B	K	H	D	M	T	G	B	K	H	D	M	T
2006	Geelong	32	8	4	2	72	34	106	30	11	0.5	0.2	9.0	4.2	13.2	3.8	1.4
2007	Geelong	32	5	3	3	48	41	89	23	12	0.6	0.6	9.6	8.2	17.8	4.6	2.4
2008	Geelong	32	12	8	1	110	147	257	55	24	0.7	0.1	9.2	12.2	21.4	4.6	2.0
2009	Essendon	9	13	5	4	161	137	298	74	47	0.4	0.3	12.4	10.5	22.9	5.7	3.6
2010	Essendon	9	15	4	4	197	137	334	84	76	0.3	0.3	13.1	9.1	22.3	5.6	5.1
2011	Essendon	9	8	1	1	66	64	130	26	24	0.1	0.1	8.2	8.0	16.2	3.2	3.0
2012	Essendon	9	0	0	0	0	0	0	0	0	0.0	0.0	0.0	0.0	0.0	0.0	0.0
Career			61	25	15	654	560	1214	292	194	0.4	0.2	10.7	9.2	19.9	4.8	3.2

Legend
G	Goals	K	Kicks	D	Disposals	T	Tackles
B	Behinds	H	Handballs	M	Marks
