= List of AFL debuts in 2012 =

During the 2012 Australian Football League (AFL) season, 122 Australian rules footballers made their AFL debut with a further 32 playing their first game for a new club. The Greater Western Sydney Giants, who joined the league in 2012, had the most debutantes with 36, with Geelong next highest with 10.

== Summary ==
Summary of debuts in 2012
Club	AFL debuts	Change of club
Adelaide	6	2
Brisbane Lions	4	2
Carlton	7	0
Collingwood	7	0
Essendon	6	0
Fremantle	5	1
Geelong	10	0
Gold Coast	6	2
Greater Western Sydney	36	10
Hawthorn	2	2
Melbourne	3	2
North Melbourne	3	0
Port Adelaide	4	4
Richmond	5	2
St Kilda	5	1
Sydney	2	2
West Coast	3	1
Western Bulldogs	8	1
Total	122	32

== AFL debuts ==
Name	Club	Age at debut	Debut round	Games (in 2012)	Goals (in 2012)	Notes
Tomas Bugg	Greater Western Sydney	18 years, 354 days	1	18	6	Round 5 Rising Star nomination
Jeremy Cameron	Greater Western Sydney	18 years, 358 days	1	16	29	Round 2 Rising Star nomination Winner 2012 AFLPA best first year player award
Stephen Coniglio	Greater Western Sydney	18 years, 100 days	1	12	2	Round 7 Rising Star nomination
Israel Folau	Greater Western Sydney	22 years, 356 days	1	13	2	Previously played rugby league for Melbourne Storm & Brisbane Broncos
Jonathan Giles	Greater Western Sydney	24 years, 76 days	1	20	18	Previously listed by Port Adelaide
Toby Greene	Greater Western Sydney	18 years, 181 days	1	19	8	Round 14 Rising Star nomination
Curtly Hampton	Greater Western Sydney	19 years, 14 days	1	17	6	
Jack Hombsch	Greater Western Sydney	19 years, 17 days	1	9	0	
Will Hoskin-Elliott	Greater Western Sydney	18 years, 204 days	1	10	9	
Adam Kennedy	Greater Western Sydney	19 years, 256 days	1	15	0	
Tim Mohr	Greater Western Sydney	23 years, 157 days	1	13	1	
Dylan Shiel	Greater Western Sydney	19 years, 15 days	1	12	5	Round 10 Rising Star nomination
Devon Smith	Greater Western Sydney	18 years, 309 days	1	20	10	Round 19 Rising Star nomination
Adam Tomlinson	Greater Western Sydney	18 years, 227 days	1	9	2	
Jacob Townsend	Greater Western Sydney	18 years, 278 days	1	11	2	
Dom Tyson	Greater Western Sydney	18 years, 290 days	1	10	4	Round 23 Rising Star nomination
Nathan Wilson	Greater Western Sydney	19 years, 77 days	1	9	6	
Harry Cunningham	Sydney	18 years, 109 days	1	1	0	
Brandon Ellis	Richmond	18 years, 239 days	1	21	2	Round 17 Rising Star nomination
Steven Morris	Richmond	23 years, 88 days	1	21	1	Son of Kevin Morris
Jarrad Boumann	Hawthorn	22 years, 225 days	1	2	0	Previously listed at Western Bulldogs
Jackson Paine	Collingwood	18 years, 283 days	1	6	8	
Paul Seedsman	Collingwood	20 years, 79 days	1	11	2	
Peter Yagmoor	Collingwood	18 years, 162 days	1	2	0	
James Magner	Melbourne	24 years, 232 days	1	17	4	
Josh Tynan	Melbourne	18 years, 146 days	1	2	0	
Aaron Hall	Gold Coast	21 years, 143 days	1	8	8	
Billie Smedts	Geelong	19 years, 297 days	1	14	6	
Orren Stephenson	Geelong	29 years, 260 days	1	8	1	Oldest first-time drafted player in AFL history.
Tory Dickson	Western Bulldogs	24 years, 188 days	1	17	23	
Clay Smith	Western Bulldogs	18 years, 326 days	1	16	6	
Terry Milera	St Kilda	24 years, 84 days	1	15	19	
Jarrad Redden	Port Adelaide	21 years, 96 days	1	9	1	
Chad Wingard	Port Adelaide	18 years, 185 days	1	19	9	Round 22 Rising Star nomination
Cameron Delaney	North Melbourne	19 years, 279 days	2	5	0	
Jack Newnes	St Kilda	19 years, 44 days	2	7	1	
Billy Longer	Brisbane Lions	18 years, 338 days	3	5	0	
Adam Treloar	Greater Western Sydney	19 years, 37 days	3	18	12	Round 18 Rising Star nomination
Sam Kerridge	Adelaide	18 years, 355 days	3	1	0	
George Horlin-Smith	Geelong	19 years, 115 days	3	3	2	Round 4 2013 Rising Star nomination
Lachie Neale	Fremantle	18 years, 181 days	4	11	4	
Cory Dell'Olio	Essendon	22 years, 135 days	4	8	9	
Shaun Edwards	Greater Western Sydney	18 years, 130 days	4	10	2	
Anthony Miles	Greater Western Sydney	20 years, 53 days	4	7	0	
Sam Shaw	Adelaide	21 years, 6 days	4	13	0	Round 21 Rising Star nomination
Bradley Hill	Hawthorn	18 years, 287 days	4	5	3	Round 6 2013 Rising Star nomination, brother of Fremantle's Stephen Hill
Jack Crisp	Brisbane Lions	18 years, 202 days	4	10	3	
Jesse Stringer	Geelong	21 years, 19 days	4	8	3	
Kirk Ugle	Collingwood	19 years, 325 days	5	3	0	Cousin of Jamie Bennell
Taylor Adams	Greater Western Sydney	18 years, 221 days	5	15	5	
Josh Bruce	Greater Western Sydney	19 years, 325 days	5	3	2	
Kyal Horsley	Gold Coast	24 years, 239 days	5	13	3	
Jarryd Lyons	Adelaide	19 years, 282 days	5	3	1	
Aaron Young	Port Adelaide	19 years, 145 days	5	12	4	
Lee Spurr	Fremantle	24 years, 283 days	6	12	0	
Ahmed Saad	St Kilda	22 years, 209 days	6	16	28	
Josh Bootsma	Carlton	19 years, 74 days	6	5	0	Son of Brad Bootsma.
Liam Sumner	Greater Western Sydney	18 years, 264 days	6	2	2	
Jacob Brennan	West Coast	22 years, 103 days	6	15	2	Son of Michael Brennan
Josh Jenkins	Adelaide	23 years, 94 days	7	11	11	Previous rookie listed at Essendon
Andrew Phillips	Greater Western Sydney	20 years, 314 days	7	9	3	
Ryan Neates	West Coast	20 years, 326 days	7	1	0	
Dayne Zorko	Brisbane Lions	23 years, 93 days	7	16	16	
Brad McKenzie	North Melbourne	18 years, 350 days	7	1	0	
Tommy Walsh	Sydney	24 years, 83 days	8	3	3	Previously played Gaelic football for Kerry GAA
Alex Sexton	Gold Coast	18 years, 168 days	8	6	1	
Matthew Buntine	Greater Western Sydney	18 years, 214 days	8	6	0	
Sam Darley	Greater Western Sydney	19 years, 95 days	8	9	0	
Daniel Pearce	Western Bulldogs	19 years, 124 days	9	5	0	
Jonathan Simpkin	Geelong	24 years, 210 days	9	4	1	Previous rookie listed at Sydney, brother of Tom Simpkin
Marley Williams	Collingwood	18 years, 309 days	9	6	1	
Jamie Elliott	Collingwood	19 years, 279 days	9	13	6	
Jordan Schroder	Geelong	19 years, 180 days	10	1	0	
Lincoln McCarthy	Geelong	18 years, 224 days	10	1	0	
Nick Haynes	Greater Western Sydney	20 years, 15 days	10	8	1	
Hayden Crozier	Fremantle	18 years, 161 days	10	3	0	
Brett O'Hanlon	Richmond	18 years, 328 days	11	8	2	
Jonathon Patton	Greater Western Sydney	19 years, 27 days	12	7	4	Number 1 draft pick, 2011 AFL draft
Sam Schulz	Greater Western Sydney	19 years, 271 days	12	1	1	
Mark Whiley	Greater Western Sydney	19 years, 198 days	12	3	0	
Sam Gibson	North Melbourne	26 years, 20 days	12	13	6	Previously rookie listed at Hawthorn
Tom Campbell	Western Bulldogs	20 years, 234 days	13	7	3	
Caolan Mooney	Collingwood	19 years, 157 days	14	4	1	Previously played Gaelic football for Down GAA
Todd Elton	Richmond	19 years, 62 days	14	1	0	
Murray Newman	West Coast	18 years, 225 days	14	4	3	
Jordan Murdoch	Geelong	19 years, 180 days	14	8	4	
Andrew McInnes	Carlton	20 years, 108 days	15	8	0	
Tom Derickx	Richmond	24 years, 218 days	15	2	0	
Tim McIntyre	Adelaide	23 years, 89 days	15	1	2	
Cameron Sutcliffe	Fremantle	20 years, 46 days	15	4	1	
Mark Baguley	Essendon	25 years, 54 days	16	7	0	
Tom Couch	Melbourne	24 years, 27 days	16	3	0	Son of Paul Couch
Josh Hall	Gold Coast	22 years, 102 days	16	2	2	
Jackson Sheringham	Geelong	24 years, 22 days	16	5	1	
Josh Walker	Geelong	19 years, 245 days	16	7	3	
Sam Dunell	St Kilda	22 years, 144 days	16	5	1	Son of Frank Dunell
Steve Clifton	Greater Western Sydney	25 years, 49 days	16	5	1	2010 J. J. Liston Trophy winner
Luke Brown	Adelaide	19 years, 297 days	16	3	0	
Levi Casboult	Carlton	22 years, 128 days	17	6	7	
Tom Bell	Carlton	21 years, 38 days	17	7	4	
Frazer Dale	Carlton	18 years, 254 days	17	2	1	
Kurt Aylett	Greater Western Sydney	20 years, 111 days	17	1	0	
Gerald Ugle	Greater Western Sydney	19 years, 173 days	17	1	1	
Sam Frost	Greater Western Sydney	23 years, 110 days	17	3	1	
Elliott Kavanagh	Essendon	19 years, 69 days	18	1	0	
Stephen Wrigley	Brisbane Lions	25 years, 102 days	18	3	0	
Jason Johannisen	Western Bulldogs	19 years, 270 days	19	3	1	
Michael Talia	Western Bulldogs	19 years, 175 days	19	4	1	brother of Daniel Talia
Jackson Allen	Gold Coast	19 years, 116 days	20	1	0	
Tim Golds	Greater Western Sydney	19 years, 127 days	20	2	0	
Nathan Blee	Port Adelaide	21 years, 340 days	20	4	0	
Lin Jong	Western Bulldogs	19 years, 69 days	20	4	1	
Fletcher Roberts	Western Bulldogs	19 years, 70 days	20	2	0	
Brendan Lee	Essendon	24 years, 338 days	20	2	0	
Piers Flanagan	Gold Coast	20 years, 141 days	21	3	0	
Nick O'Brien	Essendon	19 years, 59 days	22	2	3	
Sebastian Ross	St Kilda	19 years, 110 days	22	1	0	
Rhys Cooyou	Greater Western Sydney	21 years, 156 days	22	1	1	
Tom Sheridan	Fremantle	18 years, 309 days	23	1	0	
Jackson Merrett	Essendon	19 years, 187 days	23	1	0	
Pat McCarthy	Carlton	20 years, 175 days	23	1	0	
Luke Mitchell	Carlton	20 years, 187 days	23	1	1	

== Change of AFL club ==
Name	Club	Age at debut	Debut round	Games (in 2012)	Goals (in 2012)	Notes
Chad Cornes	Greater Western Sydney	32 years, 133 days	1	16	4	Previously played for Port Adelaide
Phil Davis	Greater Western Sydney	21 years, 207 days	1	22	5	Previously played for Adelaide
James McDonald	Greater Western Sydney	35 years, 263 days	1	13	4	Previously played for Melbourne
Rhys Palmer	Greater Western Sydney	23 years, 40 days	1	15	9	Previously played for Fremantle
Callan Ward	Greater Western Sydney	21 years, 349 days	1	20	8	Previously played for Western Bulldogs
Addam Maric	Richmond	21 years, 345 days	1	10	1	Previously played for Melbourne
Ivan Maric	Richmond	26 years, 85 days	1	21	7	Previously played for Adelaide
Jack Gunston	Hawthorn	20 years, 166 days	1	19	39	Previously played for Adelaide
Broc McCauley	Hawthorn	25 years, 101 days	1	3	1	Previously played for Brisbane Lions
Mitch Clark	Melbourne	24 years, 164 days	1	11	29	Previously played for Brisbane Lions
Ben Hudson	Brisbane Lions	33 years, 36 days	1	18	3	Previously played for Adelaide & Western Bulldogs
Matthew Warnock	Gold Coast	27 years, 363 days	1	22	0	Previously played for Melbourne
Tom Lynch	Adelaide	21 years, 198 days	1	6	7	Previously played for St Kilda
Zac Dawson	Fremantle	25 years, 200 days	1	18	2	Previously played for Hawthorn & St Kilda
Josh Hill	West Coast	23 years, 73 days	1	22	36	Previously played for Western Bulldogs
Brad Ebert	Port Adelaide	21 years, 365 days	1	22	17	Previously played for West Coast
John McCarthy	Port Adelaide	22 years, 134 days	1	21	5	Previously played for Collingwood
James Sellar	Melbourne	23 years, 14 days	2	16	9	Previously played for Adelaide
Luke Power	Greater Western Sydney	32 years, 90 days	2	20	0	Previously played for Brisbane Lions
Tom Scully	Greater Western Sydney	20 years, 328 days	2	19	4	Previously played for Melbourne
Dean Brogan	Greater Western Sydney	33 years, 123 days	3	9	0	Previously played for Port Adelaide
Darren Pfeiffer	Port Adelaide	24 years, 206 days	4	16	2	Previously played for Carlton
Brent Renouf	Port Adelaide	23 years, 354 days	4	10	2	Previously played for Hawthorn
Tony Armstrong	Sydney	22 years, 206 days	4	8	2	Previously played for Adelaide
Mark Austin	Western Bulldogs	23 years, 58 days	4	11	0	Previously played for Carlton
Sam Reid	Greater Western Sydney	22 years, 173 days	5	5	0	Previously played for Western Bulldogs
Beau Wilkes	St Kilda	22 years, 65 days	5	10	15	Previously played for West Coast
Setanta Ó hAilpín	Greater Western Sydney	29 years, 49 days	6	1	2	Previously played for Carlton
Andrew McQualter	Gold Coast	25 years, 345 days	8	5	2	Previously played for St Kilda
Jordan Lisle	Brisbane Lions	22 years, 53 days	19	5	4	Previously played for Hawthorn
Lewis Johnston	Adelaide	21 years, 161 days	20	1	0	Previously played for Sydney
Mitch Morton	Sydney	25 years, 204 days	21	5	5	Previously played for West Coast and Richmond
