= 2011 AFL Under 18 Championships =

Youth Australian rules football competition

- Teams: 8

Division 1
- Teams: 4
- Champions: Vic Metro
- Larke Medal: Stephen Coniglio

Division 2
- Teams: 4
- Champions: Tasmania
- Hunter Harrison Medal: John McKenzie

The 2011 NAB AFL Under 18 Championships were the 16th edition of the AFL Under 18 Championships. Eight teams competed in the championships: Vic Metro, Vic Country, South Australia and Western Australia in Division 1, and New South Wales/Australian Capital Territory (NSW/ACT), Northern Territory, Queensland and Tasmania in Division 2. Vic Metro were the Division One champions and Tasmania were the Division Two champions. The Larke Medal (for the best player in Division 1) was awarded to Western Australia's Stephen Coniglio, and the Hunter Harrison Medal (for the best player in Division 2) was won by Tasmania's John McKenzie.

== Format ==
The format used for the 2011 championships differed slightly from the format used in 2009 and 2010. The two-division format used since 1992 was continued, with each team playing five matches: three against the opponents from their own division, and two from the other division. The cross-divisional matches were played in the first two rounds, and did not count for points or percentage.

== Squads ==
=== Division One ===
2011 South Australia U-18 squad
Squad			Coaching staff
1 Josh Gregg; 2 Ben Kennedy; 3 Luke Wilson; 4 Jacob Carger; 5 Josh Simpson; 6 Lachie Neale; 7 Sam Mayes; 8 Nick Amato; 9 Mitch Grigg; 10 Jonathon Giannini; 11 Michael Ialeggio; 12 Alex Forster; 13 Luke Brown	14 Jason Nyskohus; 15 Sam Tonkes; 16 Todd McKay; 17 Emmanuel Irra; 18 Chad Wingard; 19 Rory Laird; 20 Thomas Schwarz; 21 Nicholas Joyce; 22 Jimmy Toumpas; 23 Steve Rusca; 24 Jack Sutcliffe; 25 Brad McKenzie; 26 Drew Gallard	27 Jordan Murdoch; 28 Matthew Jacquier; 29 Josh Waldhuter; 30 Lewis Hender; 31 Luke Rander; 32 Aaron Luccon; 33 Patrick Levicki; 34 Aseri Raikiwasa; 35 Tom Sandercock; 36 Dylan Matsen; 37 Matthew McDonough; 38 Cam Ellis-Yolmen; 39 Thomas Huppatz; 40 Brodie Grundy	Head coach: Brenton Phillips; Assistant coaches: Malcolm Ellis; Chris Smelt; Paul Henrikson; Barnaby French; Jason Blair; Legend: (c) Captain(s); (vc) Vice-captain(s)

2011 Victoria Country U-18 squad
Squad			Coaching staff
1 Alec Benbow; 2 Devon Smith; 3 Jackson Merrett; 4 Jamie Elliott; 5 Nick Haynes; 6 Ollie Wines; 7 Coleman Schache; 8 Clay Smith; 9 Shaun Wyatt; 10 Josh Tynan; 11 Brad Crouch; 12 Lachie Whitfield; 13 Lauchlan Dalgleish	14 Ryan Monaghan; 15 Damien Hector; 16 Haydn Hector; 17 Taylor Adams; 18 Jason Pongracic; 19 Sam Kerridge; 20 Lachlan Edwards; 21 Sebastin Ross; 22 Jack Crisp; 23 Sam Dobson; 24 Jay Lever; 25 Simon Deery; 26 Andrew Boseley	27 Cameron Valentine; 28 Frazer Dale; 29 Jake Reeves; 30 Matthew Buntine; 31 Zac May; 32 Shaun Marusic; 33 Nic O'Brien; 34 Sam Gordon; 35 Jordan Kelly; 36 Brent O'Hanlon; 37 Jonathon Patton; 38 Todd Elton; 39 Jordan Staley; 40 Tim Membrey	Head coach: Robert Hyde; Assistant coaches: Craig Black; Mark Ellis; Paul Henrikson; Ash Green; Phil Partington; Legend: (c) Captain(s); (vc) Vice-captain(s)

2011 Victoria Metropolitan U-18 squad
Squad			Coaching staff
1 Seb Gotch; 2 Toby Greene; 3 Alex Greenwood; 4 Adam Kennedy; 5 Liam Sumner; 6 Tim Totevski; 7 Jack Viney; 8 Max Warren; 9 Alex Woodward; 10 Mitchell Wooffindin; 11 Jack Newnes; 12 Alex Brown; 13 Michael Bussey	14 Rory Atkins; 15 Hayden Crozier; 16 Tom Curran; 17 Matthew Haynes; 18 Will Hoskin-Elliott; 19 Hal Hunter; 20 Elliott Kavanagh; 21 Daniel Markworth; 22 Doug Morris; 23 Tom Sheridan; 24 Jackson Paine; 25 Lachie Plowman; 26 Xavier Richards	27 Michael Talia; 28 Adam Tomlinson; 29 Dom Tyson; 30 Nick Vlastuin; 31 Matthew Arnot; 32 Brandon Ellis; 34 Chris Prowse; 35 Sam Frost; 36 Fletcher Roberts; 37 Ben Darrou; 38 Jonathon Patton; 39 Leif Cope; 40 Billy Longer (c)	Head coach: Rohan Welsh; Legend: (c) Captain(s); (vc) Vice-captain(s)

2011 Western Australia U-18 squad
Squad			Coaching staff
1 Cam Eardley; 2 Murray Newman; 3 Shane Nelson; 4 Mitch Howlett; 5 Tom Mitchell; 6 Shannon Taylor; 7 Will Shea; 8 Jaeger O'Meara; 9 Stephen Coniglio (c); 10 Marley Williams; 11 Sam Fong; 12 Haiden Schloithe; 13 Chris Yarran	14 Elliot Yeo; 15 Alex Devitt; 16 Laine Rasmussen; 17 Nathan Broad; 18 Mark Kickett; 19 Adam Carter; 20 Sean Lynch; 21 Dayle Garlett; 22 Steven Verrier; 23 Rhys Waters; 24 Lachlan Peters; 25 Fraser McInnes; 26 Jordan Lockyer	28 Laine Wilkins; 29 Tim O'Hara; 30 Matthew Jupp; 31 Brendon Ah Chee; 32 Riley Hutchinson; 33 Brant Colledge; 34 Alex Howard; 35 Corey Gault; 36 Myles Bolger; 37 Mason Shaw; 38 Kamdyn McIntosh; 39 Chase Strange; 40 Joel Hamling; 41 Bradley Hill; 42 Corey Chalmers; 43 Angelo Thomas; 45 Cameron Symonds	Head coach: Brad Wira; Assistant coaches: Brad Smith (forward); Murray Glaskin (defence); Michael Pratt (midfield); Silv Lombardi (development); Legend: (c) Captain(s); (vc) Vice-captain(s)

=== Division Two ===
2011 NSW/ACT U-18 squad
Squad			Coaching staff
1 Lonnie Hampton; 3 Andrew Moody; 4 Sean Johns; 5 David Coward; 6 Jack Pratt; 7 Sam Milne; 9 Dylan Stuart; 10 Jackson Potter; 11 Jordan Harper; 13 Heath Caldwell; 14 Brandon Jack; 15 Beau Walker; 16 Ashley Morris	17 Zac Williams; 18 Jack Brooks; 19 Aaron Duncan; 20 Harry Cunningham; 21 Justin Gordon; 22 James Eastoe; 23 Beau Black; 24 Liam Fraser; 25 Jonathan Gourlay; 26 David Cummins; 27 Adam Flagg; 30 Jarrod Witts; 31 Blake Guthrie	33 Eric Moody; 41 Stephen Wray; 43 Daniel Robinson; 44 Marshal Macauley; 45 James Breust; 46 Tom Stevens; 50 Matthew Lodge; 51 Jordan Taylor; 53 Ben Vile; 54 Jack Lynch; 55 Oliver Tweeddale; 57 Thomas Head; 58 Michael Hartley; 59 Nick Ryan; 60 Craig Moller	Head coach: Nick Stevens; Assistant coaches: Jason Saddington; Steve Mahar; Danny Stevens; Darren Simpson; Legend: (c) Captain(s); (vc) Vice-captain(s)

2011 Northern Territory U-18 squad
Squad			Coaching staff
1 Dean Staunton; 2 Jordan Wilson-King; 3 Caleb Hart; 4 Steven Miles; 5 Braedon McLean; 6 Liam Corrie; 7 Jack McEwin; 8 Steve Lawton; 9 Jarrod Stokes; 10 Matthew Smith; 11 Louis Egger; 12 Rohan Smith; 13 Damien Williams	14 Anthony Tipungwuti; 15 David Kruse; 16 Jaydron Nundhirribala; 17 Jed Anderson; 18 Nathan Morrison; 19 Toshie Kunoth; 20 Troy Lawton; 21 Jay Neade; 22 Jarred Erlandson; 23 Anthony Gugliotta; 24 Theo Rossides; 25 Ben Rioli; 26 Joseph Colinson	27 Brendan Palmer; 28 Reece Peckham; 30 Jack Hatcher; 31 Kelvin Williams; 32 Lachlan Michell; 33 Gibson Turner; 34 Lindsay Lawler; 35 Aaron Crauford; 36 Daniel Stafford; 37 Matthew Duffy; 38 Dionysius Munkara; 39 Jackson Clark; 40 Zac Metcalf	Head coach: Brenton Toy; Assistant coaches: Rod McLean; Kevin Bruce; Andrew McLeod; Legend: (c) Captain(s); (vc) Vice-captain(s)

2011 Queensland U-18 squad
Squad			Coaching staff
1 Josh Smith; 2 Lachlan Russ; 3 Mitch Hopkins; 4 Adam Oxley; 5 Tom Davidson; 6 Jackson Rolfe; 7 Brian Coleman-Broome; 8 Dalton Tucker (c); 9 Henry Joyce; 10 Josh Wagner; 11 Jackson Allen; 12 Allen Laskey; 13 Chris Murphy	14 Luke Chitty; 15 Alex Sexton; 16 Shaun Crook; 17 Spencer Greville; 18 Clay Cameron; 19 Fraser Thompson; 20 Daniel Hunt; 21 Sam Panoho; 22 Luke Reynolds; 23 Peter Yagmoor; 24 Fraser Thurlow; 25 Sam Michael; 26 Sam Cabrera	27 Josh Kolka; 28 Andrew Boston; 29 Alex Hall; 30 Jackson Starcevich; 31 Jesse Wallis; 32 Jack James; 33 Sam Henry; 34 Richard Newell; 35 Craig Malone; 36 Tom Fields; 37 Jordan Bain; 38 Brody Haberfield; 39 Jordon Bourke; 40 Michael Wyld	Head coach: David Ashkar; Assistant coaches: Patrick Garner (midfield); Brad Edwards (ruck); Paul Sherwood (forward); Travis Warren (defence); Legend: (c) Captain(s); (vc) Vice-captain(s)

2011 Tasmania U-18 squad
Squad			Coaching staff
1 Martyn Allison; 2 Zachary Hislop; 3 Bryce Walsh; 4 Jimmy Webster; 5 Dylan Riley; 6 Bradley Cox-Gooyer; 7 Michael Musicka; 8 Jesse Lonergan; 9 John McKenzie; 10 Trad Duggan; 11 Damon Smith; 12 Jake Jenkins; 13 Brennon Kendall	14 Quade Byard; 15 Thor Boscott; 16 Robbie McManus; 17 Ethan Petterwood; 18 Casey Radford; 19 Claude Alcorso; 20 Calen Jeffery; 21 Nathan McCulloch; 22 Robbie Fox; 23 Daniel Joseph; 24 Brody Mihocek; 25 Liam Williams; 26 Jarrod Hibberd	27 Jackson Thurlow; 28 Andrew Blight; 29 Jarrod Westell; 30 Larry Owen; 31 Aaron McNab; 32 Jobi Harper; 33 Sam Siggins; 34 Henry Schade; 35 Cody Thorp; 36 Josh Grant; 37 Daniel Fox; 38 Ben Brown; 39 Julian Dobosz; 40 Rohan Bones	Head coach: Matthew Armstrong; Assistant coaches: Adam Sanders; Richard Lakeland; Dale Gorringe; Nick Davey; Legend: (c) Captain(s); (vc) Vice-captain(s)

== Results ==
=== Round 1 ===
	Round 1
Sunday, 29 May (6:30pm)	Northern Territory 9.12 (66)	def. by	Western Australia 11.14 (80)	TIO Stadium	Report
Saturday, 4 June (10:00 am)	South Australia 14.16 (100)	def.	Queensland 6.7 (43)	Blacktown Olympic Park	Report
Saturday, 4 June (2:35 pm)	NSW/ACT 9.7 (61)	def. by	Vic Metro 21.15 (141)	Blacktown Olympic Park	Report
Sunday, 5 June (11:30 am)	Tasmania 13.5 (83)	def. by	Vic Country 15.15 (105)	Bellerive Oval	Report
Julian Dobosz kicked seven goals for Tasmania, the most of any player in the competition.

=== Round 2 ===
	Round 2
Saturday, 11 June (11:50 am)	South Australia 19.19 (133)	def.	NSW/ACT 9.4 (58)	AAMI Stadium	Report
Saturday, 11 June (12:00 pm)	Vic Country 14.14 (98)	def.	Northern Territory 9.11 (65)	Visy Park
Saturday, 11 June (2:30 pm)	Vic Metro 17.17 (119)	def.	Queensland 5.4 (34)	Visy Park	Report
Sunday, 12 June (11:20 am)	Western Australia 17.13 (115)	def.	Tasmania 4.4 (28)	Patersons Stadium	Report

=== Round 3 ===
	Round 3
Saturday, 18 June (1:00 pm)	South Australia 19.9 (123)	def.	Vic Country 11.11 (77)	Adelaide Oval	Report
Sunday, 19 June (11:15 am)	Western Australia 11.9 (75)	def. by	Vic Metro 12.13 (85)	Patersons Stadium	Report
Saturday, 25 June (10:45 am)	Queensland 15.9 (99)	def.	Northern Territory 9.7 (61)	Metricon Stadium	Report
Saturday, 25 June (12:00 pm)	Tasmania 13.13 (91)	def.	NSW/ACT 10.13 (73)	Aurora Stadium	Report

=== Round 4 ===
	Round 4
Friday, 1 July (12:10 pm)	Vic Metro 10.16 (76)	def.	South Australia 7.8 (50)	Skilled Stadium	Report
Friday, 1 July (2:30 pm)	Vic Country 12.13 (85)	def.	Western Australia 5.6 (36)	Skilled Stadium	Report
Saturday, 2 July (12:00 pm)	Northern Territory 5.6 (36)	def. by	Tasmania 10.9 (69)	Visy Park	Report
Saturday, 2 July (2:15 pm)	Queensland 3.7 (25)	def. by	NSW/ACT 12.7 (79)	Visy Park	Report

=== Round 5 ===
	Round 5
Wednesday, 6 July (5:35 pm)	Vic Metro 9.16 (70)	def.	Vic Country 2.10 (22)	Etihad Stadium	Report
Wednesday, 6 July (7:35 pm)	South Australia 14.10 (94)	def.	Western Australia 11.10 (76)	Etihad Stadium
Thursday, 7 July (12:15 pm)	Queensland 7.10 (52)	def. by	Tasmania 13.7 (85)	Skilled Stadium
Thursday, 7 July (2:30 pm)	Northern Territory 10.7 (67)	def.	NSW/ACT 9.9 (63)	Skilled Stadium	Report

== All-Australian team ==
The 2011 Under 18 All-Australian team was named on 9 July 2011:

2011 Under 18 All-Australian team
B:	Jed Anderson (NT)	Michael Talia (VM)	Brandon Ellis (VM)
HB:	Brad Crouch (VC)	Brody Mihocek (Tas)	Alex Forster (SA)
C:	Jaeger O'Meara (WA)	Toby Greene (VM)	Will Hoskin-Elliott (VM)
HF:	Chad Wingard (SA)	Sam Mayes (SA)	Lachie Whitfield (VC)
F:	Ben Kennedy (SA)	Jonathon Patton (VM)	John McKenzie (Tas)
Foll:	Billy Longer (VM)	Dom Tyson (VM)	Stephen Coniglio (WA)
Int:	Mitch Grigg (SA)	Brodie Grundy (SA)	Taylor Adams (VC)
Int:	Clay Smith (VC)		
Coach:	Rohan Welsh (VM)		
