= Dylan Buckley =

Australian rules footballer (born 1993)

Personal information
- Full name: Dylan Buckley
- Born: 16 March 1993 (age 33); Ballarat, Victoria
- Original team: Northern Knights (TAC Cup)
- Draft: No. 62 (F/S), 2011 national draft No. 15, 2018 rookie draft
- Height: 179 cm (5 ft 10 in)
- Weight: 77 kg (170 lb)

Playing career^{1}
Years	Club	Games (Goals)
2012–2017	Carlton	39 (16)
2018–2019	Greater Western Sydney	2 (2)
Total		41 (18)
- ^{1} Playing statistics correct to the end of 2019.

Career highlights
- Rising Star Nomination: 2014

Dylan Buckley (born 16 March 1993) is a former professional Australian rules footballer who played for the Greater Western Sydney Giants and the Carlton Football Club in the Australian Football League (AFL).

== Junior career ==
Buckley played school football for Ivanhoe Grammar School and also played TAC Cup football with the Northern Knights. He was a member of the 2009 AIS-AFL Academy, and he represented Vic Metro in the 2010 AFL Under 18 Championships. He was described by Carlton recruiting manager Wayne Hughes as "a quick midfielder with excellent disposal skills". He previously played junior football for Fitzroy Junior Football Club in the Yarra Junior Football League.

== AFL career ==
Buckley is the only son of Jim Buckley, who was a midfielder for Carlton in the 1970s and 1980s. Jim played 164 games for Carlton and was a member of the 1979, 1981 and 1982 premiership teams. Because of his father's career, Buckley was eligible to be drafted by Carlton under the Father–Son Rule. The club had informally committed to recruiting Buckley in early 2010, more than eighteen months before he was eligible to be drafted. Buckley was formally recruited under the Father–Son Rule in October 2011, with Carlton able to use its last selection in the 2011 National Draft (a third-round selection, No. 62) to recruit him. He was given guernsey number 7. Buckley made his debut in Round 3 of the 2013 season, starting the game as a substitute. Buckley kicked a goal with his first kick in AFL football and finished the game with 5 disposals, but that was his only game of 2013.

In 2014, Buckley started the season with an outstanding game against the Richmond Tigers in Round 2, gathering 18 disposals and 6 tackles, and was nominated for the AFL Rising Star award; however, he only played a further 7 games for the season.

2015 was a breakout year for Buckley, cementing his spot in Carlton's best 22, playing 18 games and kicking 5 goals for the season. His highlight of the season included a career-high 23 disposals against Fremantle in Round 16.

2016 saw Buckley struggle with inconsistent form and injury, only managing 11 games for the year, but he had a career-high three goals against the Demons in round 22.

At the conclusion of the 2017 season, in which Buckley only managed to play a single game, he was delisted by Carlton. However, he was later selected by the Greater Western Sydney Giants via the 2017 rookie draft. He went on to play a further two games for the Giants in 2018, including a game where he kicked two goals against Essendon in Round 10, which was also his last game in the AFL. He was delisted by Greater Western Sydney Giants at the conclusion of the 2019 season.
