= 2016 AFL Mark of the Year =

- Date: 22 July 2016
- Location: Etihad Stadium
- Winner: Majak Daw (North Melbourne)

The Australian Football League celebrates the best mark of the season through the annual Mark of the Year competition. Each round three marks are nominated and fans are able to vote online for their favourite. Majak Daw of the North Melbourne Football Club for his mark taken in round 18 against the Collingwood Football Club.

== Winners by round ==
Legend

= Round's winning mark

Round	Nominees	Team	% of votes	Opposition	Ground
1	Patrick Dangerfield	Geelong	19%	Hawthorn	MCG
1	Andrew Walker	Carlton	25%	Richmond	MCG
1	Easton Wood	Western Bulldogs	56%	Fremantle	Etihad Stadium
2	Joe Daniher	Essendon	38%	Melbourne	MCG
2	Will Hoskin-Elliott	Greater Western Sydney	48%	Geelong	Manuka Oval
2	Jack Riewoldt	Richmond	14%	Collingwood	MCG
3	Joe Daniher	Essendon	24%	Port Adelaide	Adelaide Oval
3	Sam Lloyd	Richmond	22%	Adelaide	Etihad Stadium
3	Luke Parker	Sydney	55%	Greater Western Sydney	SCG
4	Sean Dempster	St Kilda	21%	Hawthorn	Aurora Stadium
4	Paddy McCartin	St Kilda	35%	Hawthorn	Aurora Stadium
4	Zac Smith	Geelong	44%	Essendon	MCG
5	Paul Puopolo	Hawthorn	43%	Adelaide	MCG
5	Ted Richards	Sydney	49%	West Coast	SCG
5	Cyril Rioli	Hawthorn	8%	Adelaide	MCG
6	Rory Lobb	Greater Western Sydney	12%	Hawthorn	Spotless Stadium
6	Matthew Pavlich	Fremantle	42%	Adelaide	Adelaide Oval
6	Robbie Tarrant	North Melbourne	46%	Western Bulldogs	Etihad Stadium
7	Darcy Moore	Collingwood	20%	Carlton	MCG
7	Paul Puopolo	Hawthorn	46%	Richmond	MCG
7	Jake Stringer	Western Bulldogs	34%	Adelaide	Etihad Stadium
8	Tom Lynch	Gold Coast	11%	Greater Western Sydney	Spotless Stadium
8	Easton Wood	Western Bulldogs	48%	Melbourne	MCG
8	Mason Wood	North Melbourne	41%	Essendon	Etihad Stadium
9	Tom Hawkins	Geelong	31%	Collingwood	MCG
9	Jeremy Howe	Collingwood	28%	Geelong	MCG
9	James Sicily	Hawthorn	41%	Sydney	MCG
10
10	Hayden Crozier	Fremantle	44%	St Kilda	Etihad Stadium
10	Tom Lynch	Gold Coast	11%	West Coast	Domain Stadium
10	Paddy McCartin	St Kilda	44%	Fremantle	Etihad Stadium
11
11	Rory Lobb	Greater Western Sydney	61%	Geelong	Simonds Stadium
11	Will Schofield	West Coast	17%	Western Bulldogs	Etihad Stadium
11	Matt Taberner	Fremantle	22%	Essendon	Domain Stadium
12	Charlie Cameron	Adelaide	24%	West Coast	Domain Stadium
12	Ben Griffiths	Richmond	38%	Gold Coast	MCG
12	Nathan Krakouer	Port Adelaide	38%	Western Bulldogs	Adelaide Oval
13	Martin Gleeson	Essendon	28%	Greater Western Sydney	Etihad Stadium
13	Tim O'Brien	Hawthorn	45%	North Melbourne	Etihad Stadium
13	Mason Wood	North Melbourne	27%	Hawthorn	Etihad Stadium
14
14	Rory Laird	Adelaide	48%	North Melbourne	Adelaide Oval
14	Jake Lever	Adelaide	28%	North Melbourne	Adelaide Oval
14	Jack Riewoldt	Richmond	24%	Brisbane Lions	MCG
15	Heath Grundy	Sydney	27%	Western Bulldogs	SCG
15	Josh Jenkins	Adelaide	44%	Melbourne	MCG
15	Liam Picken	Western Bulldogs	30%	Sydney	SCG
16
16	Joe Daniher	Essendon	70%	St Kilda	Etihad Stadium
16	Jeremy Howe	Collingwood	10%	Greater Western Sydney	Spotless Stadium
16	Paul Puopolo	Hawthorn	20%	Port Adelaide	Adelaide Oval
17	Ben Brown	North Melbourne	20%	Port Adelaide	Etihad Stadium
17	Cyril Rioli	Hawthorn	50%	Sydney	SCG
17	Jack Viney	Melbourne	30%	St Kilda	Etihad Stadium
18
18	Majak Daw	North Melbourne	80%	Collingwood	Etihad Stadium
18	Eric Hipwood	Brisbane Lions	9%	Essendon	Etihad Stadium
18	Liam Picken	Western Bulldogs	11%	St Kilda	Etihad Stadium
19	Darcy Moore	Collingwood	22%	West Coast	MCG
19	Drew Petrie	North Melbourne	40%	St Kilda	Etihad Stadium
19	Michael Walters	Fremantle	38%	Sydney	Domain Stadium
20	Cameron Pedersen	Melbourne	43%	Hawthorn	MCG
20	Cyril Rioli	Hawthorn	45%	Melbourne	MCG
20	Sam Rowe	Carlton	12%	St Kilda	MCG
21	Jeremy Howe	Collingwood	32%	Western Bulldogs	Etihad Stadium
21	Lincoln McCarthy	Geelong	21%	Richmond	MCG
21	Cameron Pedersen	Melbourne	47%	Port Adelaide	Adelaide Oval
22
22	Joe Daniher	Essendon	48%	Western Bulldogs	Etihad Stadium
22	Jeremy Howe	Collingwood	21%	Gold Coast	Etihad Stadium
22	Taylor Walker	Adelaide	31%	Port Adelaide	Adelaide Oval
23
23	Jeremy Howe	Collingwood	44%	Hawthorn	MCG
23	Cyril Rioli	Hawthorn	40%	Collingwood	MCG
23	Steven May	Gold Coast	15%	Port Adelaide	Metricon Stadium

== Finalists ==
Round	Nominees	Team	Opposition	Ground	Description
11	Rory Lobb	Greater Western Sydney	Geelong	Simonds Stadium	Crazy-brave Giant mimics Riewoldt and Brown by going back with the flight
16	Joe Daniher	Essendon	St Kilda	Etihad Stadium	Bombers key forward gets extraordinarily high with a leap over Sam Gilbert
18	Majak Daw	North Melbourne	Collingwood	Etihad Stadium	Kangaroos ruckman leaps high over Magpie for incredible hanger
