= Jacob Brennan =

Australian rules footballer

Personal information
- Full name: Jacob Robert Brennan
- Born: 24 January 1990 (age 36)
- Original team: Bullcreek-Leeming JFC
- Draft: 62nd pick, 2010 National draft (F/S)
- Height: 188 cm (6 ft 2 in)
- Weight: 82 kg (181 lb)
- Position: Defender

Playing career^{1}
| Years | Club | Games (Goals) |
| 2011–2014 | West Coast | 28 (2) |
- ^{1} Playing statistics correct to the end of 2014.

Jacob Robert Brennan (born 24 January 1990) is an Australian rules footballer who previously played for the West Coast Eagles in the Australian Football League (AFL). The son of Michael Brennan, Brennan was drafted at the 2010 National draft, under the father–son rule. He made his debut for the club during the 2012 season, and played 28 games before being delisted at the end of the 2014 season.

== Football career ==
The son of Michael Brennan, who played 179 games for West Coast between 1987 and 1995, Brennan played for East Fremantle in the West Australian Football League (WAFL) before being drafted under the father–son rule with West Coast's fourth-round selection, pick number 62 overall, in the 2010 National draft. Playing mainly as a defender, Brennan was a mature-age recruit, and made his debut against North Melbourne in round five of the 2012 season.

Brennan was the first son of a West Coast Eagles player to also be listed at the club.

Brennan was delisted by West Coast at the end of the 2014 season. He had played at AFL level only twice during the season.

== See also ==
- List of AFL debuts in 2012
- List of West Coast Eagles players
