= Will Hoskin-Elliott =

Australian rules footballer

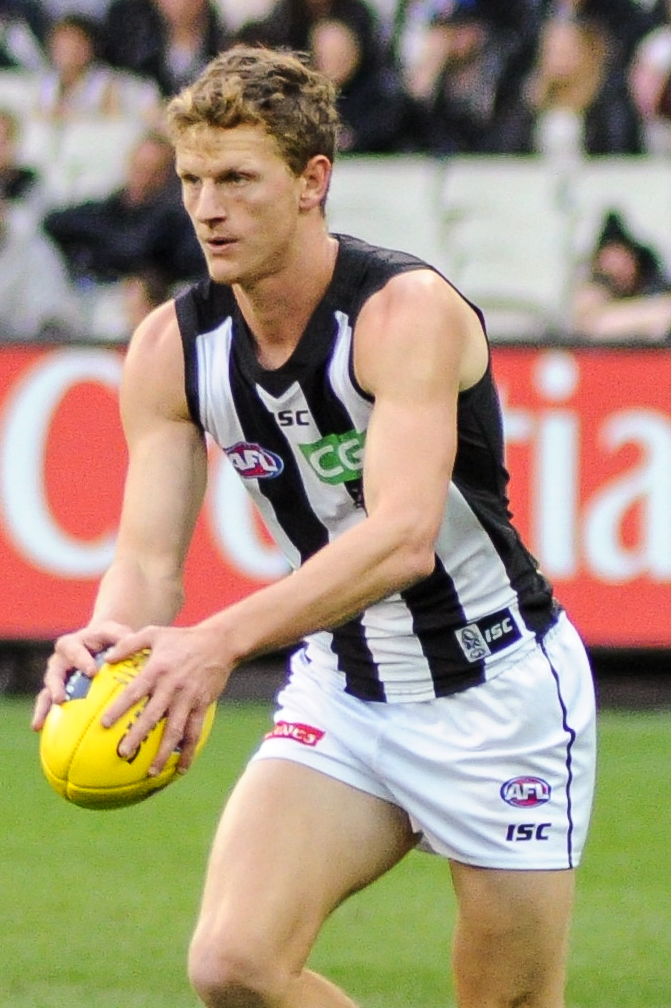
- Hoskin-Elliott playing for Collingwood in June 2017

Personal information
- Full name: William Hoskin-Elliott
- Nicknames: The Hyphen, WHE
- Born: 2 September 1993 (age 33); Sunshine West, Victoria
- Original team: Western Jets (TAC Cup)/North Sunshine
- Draft: No. 4, 2011 national draft
- Height: 186 cm (6 ft 1 in)
- Weight: 82 kg (181 lb)
- Position: Midfielder

Playing career
Years	Club	Games (Goals)
2012–2016	Greater Western Sydney	52 (42)
2017–2025	Collingwood	190 (156)
Total		242 (198)

Career highlights
- AFL premiership player: 2023; Inaugural Greater Western Sydney team; NEAFL premiership player 2016

William Hoskin-Elliott (born 2 September 1993) is a former professional Australian rules footballer who played in the Australian Football League (AFL) for Greater Western Sydney from 2012 to 2016 and for the Collingwood Football Club from 2017 to 2025.

== Junior football career ==
Hoskin-Elliott played junior football for North Sunshine in the Western Region Football League. During his time at the club he kicked 223 goals in 106 games, including 66 goals in the 2005 season, during which he won the Under-12 Division 3 best and fairest award. Three years later, in the 2008 season, Hoskin-Elliott won the Under 16 Division 2 best and fairest award.

Afterwards, Hoskin-Elliott joined the Western Jets in the TAC Cup. In the 2010 TAC Cup season, he played seven matches. He played only 12 matches in the 2011 TAC Cup season, but finished second in the club's best and fairest vote. Hoskin-Elliott represented Vic Metro in the 2011 AFL Under 18 Championships, including being selected among the best in their matches against Vic Country and against Western Australia, and was selected for the All-Australian team.

== Senior football career ==
=== Greater Western Sydney ===
Hoskin-Elliott was drafted by Greater Western Sydney with the fourth overall selection in the 2011 national draft. He made his debut in Greater Western Sydney's inaugural season, in 2012, playing in the opening round of the season against Sydney, kicking one of the club's five goals. During the 2014 season, Hoskin-Elliott showed his promise, kicking 26 goals in 20 games. However, due to soft-tissue injuries, he only managed to play 11 games in the 2015 season and the first two games of the 2016 season. His last game at the club, a win against Geelong in the second round, saw him take a screamer which was a Mark of the Year contender.

=== Collingwood ===
At the conclusion of the 2016 season, Hoskin-Elliott was traded to Collingwood for their second round pick of the 2017 AFL draft. Collingwood's list manager, Derek Hine, said that he "is an elite talent, someone we thought highly of as a junior and a player we have tracked throughout his career." Hoskin-Elliott kicked a career-high six goals in the round 11 victory over Fremantle during the 2018 season. He made his 100th AFL appearance in the 2018 grand final against West Coast at the Melbourne Cricket Ground. Hoskin-Elliott missed the beginning of the 2019 season following minor surgery on his left iliotibial band. In February 2019, he signed a contract extension, keeping him at Collingwood until the end of the 2022 season.

Hoskin-Elliott was part of Collingwood's 2023 premiership winning team.

On 20 August 2025, Hoskin-Elliott announced he would be retiring at the end of the 2025 season.

== Personal life ==
Hoskin-Elliott's great-great grandfather Charlie Norris was a three-time premiership player, once for Collingwood in 1910 and twice for Fitzroy in 1913 and 1916.

Hoskin-Elliott grew up supporting Collingwood while living in West Sunshine, a suburb in the west of Melbourne.

He married his high school sweetheart, Kirstie, in October 2017, and she gave birth to their first child, Flynn, in May 2018. This was followed by a daughter, Ivy, in April 2021.

== Statistics ==
Legend
G	Goals	K	Kicks	D	Disposals	T	Tackles
B	Behinds	H	Handballs	M	Marks
#	Played in that season's premiership team

Season	Team	No.	Games	Totals							Averages (per game)							Votes
Season	Team	No.	Games	G	B	K	H	D	M	T	G	B	K	H	D	M	T	Votes
2012	Greater Western Sydney	33	10	9	2	80	36	116	36	12	0.9	0.2	8.0	3.6	11.6	3.6	1.2	2
2013	Greater Western Sydney	33	9	3	9	71	34	105	33	15	0.3	1.0	7.9	3.8	11.7	3.7	1.7	0
2014	Greater Western Sydney	33	20	26	20	187	75	262	96	50	1.3	1.0	9.4	3.8	13.1	4.8	2.5	2
2015	Greater Western Sydney	33	11	3	8	75	32	107	45	28	0.3	0.7	6.8	2.9	9.7	4.1	2.5	0
2016	Greater Western Sydney	33	2	1	0	14	6	20	7	6	0.5	0.0	7.0	3.0	10.0	3.5	3.0	0
2017	Collingwood	32	22	18	6	246	159	405	143	70	0.8	0.3	11.2	7.2	18.4	6.5	3.2	4
2018	Collingwood	32	26	42	16	226	117	343	135	45	1.6	0.6	8.7	4.5	13.2	5.2	1.7	3
2019	Collingwood	32	19	19	8	196	87	283	128	33	1.0	0.4	10.3	4.6	14.9	6.7	1.7	0
2020 (Note: The 2020 season was played with 17 home-and-away matches per team (down from 22) and 16-minute quarters with time on (down from 20-minute quarters with time on) due to the impact of the COVID-19 pandemic.)	Collingwood	32	18	11	8	123	72	195	85	17	0.6	0.4	6.8	4.0	10.8	4.7	0.9	0
2021	Collingwood	32	20	13	2	213	101	314	124	45	0.7	0.1	10.7	5.1	15.7	6.2	2.3	0
2022	Collingwood	32	24	14	7	203	115	318	98	51	0.6	0.3	8.5	4.8	13.3	4.1	2.1	0
2023^{#}	Collingwood	32	23	10	4	199	87	286	92	47	0.4	0.2	8.7	3.8	12.4	4.0	2.0	0
2024	Collingwood	32	20	17	13	194	56	250	90	26	0.9	0.7	9.7	2.8	12.5	4.5	1.3	0
2025	Collingwood	32	18	12	7	110	48	158	60	25	0.7	0.4	6.1	2.7	8.8	3.3	1.4	0
Career			242	198	110	2137	1025	3162	1172	470	0.8	0.5	8.8	4.2	13.1	4.8	1.9	11

== Honours and achievements ==
Team

AFL

- AFL premiership player (Collingwood): 2023
- AFL minor premiership (Collingwood): 2023

NEAFL

- NEAFL premiership player (WSU Giants): 2016
