= Tim McIntyre =

Australian rules footballer (born 1989)

Personal information
- Full name: Timothy McIntyre
- Nickname: Tim
- Born: 9 April 1989 (age 37)
- Original team: Sturt (SANFL)
- Draft: No. 41, 2012 Rookie Draft, Adelaide
- Height: 179 cm (5 ft 10 in)
- Weight: 80 kg (176 lb)

Playing career^{1}
Years	Club	Games (Goals)
2012–2013	Adelaide	1 (2)
- ^{1} Playing statistics correct to the end of 2013.

Timothy McIntyre (born 9 April 1989) is an Australian rules footballer who played for the Adelaide Football Club in the Australian Football League (AFL). He was recruited by the club in the 2012 Rookie Draft, with pick #41. McIntyre made his debut in round 15, 2012, against Port Adelaide at AAMI Stadium in Showdown XXXIII.
