= 2011 AFL draft =

Draft for the Australian Football League

General information
- Dates: 24 November 2011; 13 December 2011
- Location: Sydney, New South Wales
- Network: Fox Sports
- Sponsored by: National Australia Bank

Overview
- League: AFL
- Expansion teams: Greater Western Sydney
- Expansion season: 2012
- First selection: Jonathon Patton (Greater Western Sydney)

The 2011 AFL draft consisted of five opportunities for player acquisitions during the 2011/12 Australian Football League off-season.

These were:

- 2011 trade week; which was held between 10 October and 17 October
- A mini-draft of 17-year-old players, as part of the recruitment concessions given to the newly established Greater Western Sydney Giants, which was held on 13 October
- The 2011 national draft; which was held on 24 November in Sydney.
- The 2012 pre-season draft, held on 13 December 2011 and
- The 2012 rookie draft, also on 13 December 2011.

It was the first national draft to feature the Greater Western Sydney Giants, who joined the league in 2012. It was the final draft period before the introduction of free agency in the 2012/13 offseason.

== Greater Western Sydney concessions ==
The Greater Western Sydney Giants were to join the AFL in 2012, and were provided with several draft concessions, including additional draft selections, early access to recruit 17-year-old players, and access to uncontracted and previously listed players in this offseason. These concessions were similar to those provided to the Gold Coast Football Club, which entered the league in the previous season.

Greater Western Sydney was permitted to recruit the following players directly, without the need for any draft:

- At the end of 2010, up to twelve 17-year-old players (born between 1 January – 30 April 1993), who were too young to enter the 2010 AFL draft. These players were not eligible to play senior AFL football in 2011, and would continue to undergo junior development, either in Sydney or their home state.
- Up to ten players who were not on an AFL list but had previously nominated for a national draft. These players could be recruited at the end of either 2011 or 2012, with no more than ten players recruited in this manner over the two years. Greater Western Sydney could immediately trade any players recruited in this manner.
- Up to sixteen players who were on an AFL list, but were out of contract at the end of the season. Again, these players could be recruited at the end of either 2011 or 2012, with no more than sixteen players recruited in this manner over the two years, and no more than one player recruited from any other club. Clubs who lost players in this manner received compensatory selections in the national draft; the number and value of these selections was determined based on age, contract size, on-field performance and draft order, and were permitted to be used in any year between 2011 and 2015.
- Up to sixteen players recruited from the New South Wales and Australian Capital Territory zone, recruited at any time between 2010 and 2013, and from the Northern Territory zone, recruited between 2011 and 2013.

Then, in the drafts, Greater Western Sydney had the following selections:

- In the 2011 national draft, the first selection in each round, and picks No. 2, 3, 5, 7, 9, 11, 13 and 15 in the first round.
- In the 2011 rookie draft, the first eight selections.
- In the 2012 rookie draft, the first selection in each round.

Additionally, at the end of 2011, Greater Western Sydney had the ability to trade the only four selections in a once-off "mini-draft", which could be used to recruit 17-year-old players (born between 1 January – 30 April 1994). Greater Western Sydney could only use these draft picks as trade currency; the club was not permitted to use the picks for its own list development. Players recruited and traded in this manner were not eligible to play senior AFL football in 2012, and would continue to undergo junior development. This specific concession was unique to Greater Western Sydney; Gold Coast did not have the same concession the previous year.

Greater Western Sydney began with an expanded list size of up to fifty senior players and nine rookies, to be gradually reduced to a standard list size of thirty-eight senior players and nine rookies by 2019.

During the 2011 AFL season there was speculation about several players who would be uncontracted at the end of the season, including Tom Scully, Rhys Palmer, Callan Ward and Taylor Walker. In August 2011, Phil Davis from Adelaide was the first player to announce a move to Greater Western Sydney as an uncontracted player signing. After the season had ended, Palmer, Scully and Ward also announced moves to the Giants. As compensation, Scully was rated as a top-level player, resulting in Melbourne receiving both a first-round and a mid-first round draft pick as compensation. Davis and Ward were rated as second-level, earning Adelaide and Western Bulldogs a first round compensation selection, and Palmer was rated a third-level player, giving Fremantle an end of first round selection.

== Player movements ==
=== Trades ===
In the lead up to trade week, the requests of players to move back to their home states dominated most trade rumours. Mitch Clark, Leon Davis, Brad Ebert and Jack Gunston all requested to be traded back to teams in their states of origin.

Early in trade week, many trades involved unlisted players being recruited directly by Greater Western Sydney under the club's concessions, then immediately traded. Where this has occurred, the club from which GWS recruited the player is shown in parentheses after his name.

| Trade | Player | Traded from | Traded to | Traded for |
|---|---|---|---|---|
| 1 | Steven Morris (West Adelaide) draft pick No. 15 | Greater Western Sydney | Richmond | draft pick No. 14 |
| 2 | Martin Clarke (Down GAA); Jamie Elliott (Murray Bushrangers) draft pick No. 67 | Greater Western Sydney | Collingwood | draft pick No. 25 |
| 3 | Jack Gunston draft pick No. 53 and 71 | Adelaide | Hawthorn | draft picks No. 24, 46 and 64 |
| 4 | draft pick No. 4 compensation draft pick (first round) | Gold Coast | Greater Western Sydney | Mini-draft pick No. 1 draft pick No. 31 |
| 5 | Terry Milera (Port Adelaide Magpies); Ahmed Saad (Northern Bullants) draft pick No. 25 | Greater Western Sydney | St Kilda | draft pick No. 20 |
| 6 | draft pick No. 20 | Greater Western Sydney | Fremantle | compensation draft pick (end of first round) |
| 7 | Luke Brown (Norwood); Mini-draft pick No. 2 | Greater Western Sydney | Adelaide | draft pick No. 10 compensation draft pick (first round) |
| 8 | Will Sierakowski | Hawthorn | North Melbourne | draft pick No. 58 |
| 9 | Ivan Maric | Adelaide | Richmond | draft pick No. 37 |
| 10 | Tom Lynch | St Kilda | Adelaide | draft pick No. 37 |
| 11 | Brent Renouf | Hawthorn | Port Adelaide | draft pick No. 33 |
| 12 | Mitch Clark | Brisbane Lions | Melbourne | draft pick No. 12 |
| 13 | Jordan Lisle | Hawthorn | Brisbane Lions | priority draft pick (No. 29) |
| 14 | draft picks No. 38 and 56 | Fremantle | Hawthorn | priority draft pick (No. 29) draft picks No. 58 and 71 |
| 15 | Jarrad Boumann (Box Hill Hawks) | Greater Western Sydney | Hawthorn | draft pick No. 56 |
| 16 | Chad Cornes; Dean Brogan draft pick No. 69 | Port Adelaide | Greater Western Sydney | draft pick No. 49 |
| 17 | Brad Ebert draft pick No. 45 | West Coast | Port Adelaide | priority draft pick (No. 28) draft pick No. 49 |
| 18 | Peter Yagmoor (QLD zone selection) draft pick No. 50 | Gold Coast | Collingwood | draft pick No. 47 |
| 19 | Mitch Morton | Richmond | Sydney | draft pick No. 79 |
| 20 | Luke Power | Brisbane Lions | Greater Western Sydney | draft pick No. 69 |
| 21 | Josh Hill | Western Bulldogs | West Coast | draft pick No. 49 |
| 22 | Dayne Zorko (QLD zone selection) draft pick No. 47 | Gold Coast | Brisbane Lions | draft pick No. 34 (3-way trade) |
| 23 | draft pick No. 34 | Brisbane Lions | Gold Coast | (3-way trade) |
| 24 | Matthew Warnock | Melbourne | Gold Coast | (3-way trade) |
| 25 | Ben Hudson | Western Bulldogs | Brisbane Lions | draft pick No. 70 |
| 26 | draft pick No. 26 | Geelong | Gold Coast | draft picks No. 32 and 34 |
| 27 | draft pick No. 24 | Adelaide | Gold Coast | draft picks No. 27, 31 and 68 |
| 28 | Tony Armstrong draft pick No. 35 and 68 | Adelaide | Sydney | Lewis Johnston |
| 29 | Tommy Walsh | St Kilda | Sydney | draft picks No. 35 and 68 |
| 30 | Josh Jenkins draft pick No. 41 | Essendon | Adelaide | draft pick No. 31 |
| 31 | compensation draft pick (end of first round) | Richmond | Gold Coast | draft pick No. 26 compensation draft pick (second round) |

Note: the numbering of the draft picks in this trades table is based on the original order prior to draft day. The final numbering of many of these draft picks was adjusted on draft day due to either the insertion of compensation draft picks in the early rounds, or clubs passing in the later rounds.

=== Retirements and delistings ===
| Name | Club | Date | Notes |
|---|---|---|---|
| Albert Proud | Brisbane Lions | 10 February 2011 | Sacked, continuous breaches of contract. |
| Brendan Fevola | Brisbane Lions | 20 February 2011 | Sacked, continuous breaches of contract. |
| Craig Bolton | Sydney | 24 March 2011 | Retirement, due to ankle injury. |
| Tom Hunter | Collingwood | 31 March 2011 | Retirement, due to neck injury. |
| Daniel Bradshaw | Sydney | 17 June 2011 | Retirement, due to knee injury. |
| Scott Stevens | Adelaide | 21 June 2011 | Retirement, because of multiple head knocks. |
| Dean Brogan | Port Adelaide | 28 June 2011 | Retirement, at end of season. |
| Barry Hall | Western Bulldogs | 19 July 2011 | Retirement, at end of season. |
| Marcus Drum | Geelong | 21 July 2011 | Retirement, due to ongoing injury problems. |
| Mark Williams | Essendon | 25 July 2011 | Retirement, due to degenerative knee condition. |
| Chad Cornes | Port Adelaide | 3 August 2011 | Retirement, at end of season. |
| Jamie Charman | Brisbane Lions | 3 August 2011 | Retirement, effective immediately. |
| Darcy Daniher | Essendon | 13 August 2011 | Retirement, due to ongoing groin injuries. |
| Daniel Harris | Gold Coast | 17 August 2011 | Retirement, due to ongoing injury. |
| Cameron Mooney | Geelong | 23 August 2011 | Retirement, at end of season. |
| Brady Rawlings | North Melbourne | 24 August 2011 | Retirement, at end of season. |
| Mitch Hahn | Western Bulldogs | 24 August 2011 | Retirement, at end of season. |
| Ben Hudson | Western Bulldogs | 24 August 2011 | Retirement, at end of season. |
| Luke Power | Brisbane Lions | 27 August 2011 | Retirement, effective immediately. |
| Byron Schammer | Fremantle | 29 August 2011 | Retirement, at end of season. |
| Brad Moran | Adelaide | 31 August 2011 | Retirement, effective immediately. |
| Roger Hayden | Fremantle | 31 August 2011 | Retirement, due to ongoing injury. |
| Tadhg Kennelly | Sydney | 1 September 2011 | Retirement, at end of season. |
| Leigh Brown | Collingwood | 1 September 2011 | Retirement, at end of season. |
| Nathan Ablett | Gold Coast | 5 September 2011 | Delisted. |
| Michael Coad | Gold Coast | 5 September 2011 | Delisted. |
| Marc Lock | Gold Coast | 5 September 2011 | Delisted. |
| Jack Stanlake | Gold Coast | 5 September 2011 | Delisted. |
| Roland Ah Chee | Gold Coast | 5 September 2011 | Delisted. |
| Jake Crawford | Gold Coast | 5 September 2011 | Delisted. |
| Jack Stanley | Gold Coast | 5 September 2011 | Delisted. |
| Joel Tippett | Gold Coast | 5 September 2011 | Delisted. |
| Clayton Hinkley | Fremantle | 7 September 2011 | Delisted. |
| Joel Houghton | Fremantle | 7 September 2011 | Delisted. |
| Tim Ruffles | Fremantle | 7 September 2011 | Delisted. |
| Ben Bucovaz | Fremantle | 7 September 2011 | Delisted. |
| Hamish Shepheard | Fremantle | 7 September 2011 | Delisted. |
| Ryan Houlihan | Carlton | 8 September 2011 | Retirement, effective immediately for AFL games, and at end of season for VFL-affiliate games. |
| Ed Lower | North Melbourne | 8 September 2011 | Delisted. |
| Ben Ross | North Melbourne | 8 September 2011 | Delisted. |
| Brayden Norris | North Melbourne | 8 September 2011 | Delisted. |
| Marcus White | North Melbourne | 8 September 2011 | Delisted. |
| Matthew Scott | North Melbourne | 8 September 2011 | Delisted. |
| Michael Gardiner | St Kilda | 10 September 2011 | Retired. |
| Steven Baker | St Kilda | 10 September 2011 | Retired. |
| Robert Eddy | St Kilda | 10 September 2011 | Retired. |
| Andrew McQualter | St Kilda | 10 September 2011 | Retired. |
| Matt Austin | Brisbane Lions | 11 September 2011 | Delisted. |
| Xavier Clarke | Brisbane Lions | 11 September 2011 | Delisted. |
| Broc McCauley | Brisbane Lions | 11 September 2011 | Delisted. |
| Bart McCulloch | Brisbane Lions | 11 September 2011 | Delisted. |
| Tom Hislop | Richmond | 12 September 2011 | Delisted. |
| Robert Hicks | Richmond | 12 September 2011 | Delisted. |
| Nick Westhoff | Richmond | 12 September 2011 | Delisted. |
| Tyson Slattery | Essendon | 19 September 2011 | Delisted. |
| Taite Silverlock | Essendon | 19 September 2011 | Delisted. |
| James Webster | Essendon | 19 September 2011 | Delisted. |
| Marlon Motlop | Port Adelaide | 22 September 2011 | Delisted. |
| Matthew Westhoff | Port Adelaide | 22 September 2011 | Delisted. |
| Callum Hay | Port Adelaide | 22 September 2011 | Delisted. |
| Danny Meyer | Port Adelaide | 22 September 2011 | Retired. |
| Brett Jones | West Coast | 27 September 2011 | Retired. |
| Daniel Bass | Port Adelaide | 29 September 2011 | Delisted. |
| Tim Houlihan | West Coast | 4 October 2011 | Delisted. |
| Jarrad Oakley-Nicholls | West Coast | 4 October 2011 | Delisted. |
| Cameron Ling | Geelong | 5 October 2011 | Retired. |
| Andrew Welsh | Essendon | 7 October 2011 | Retirement, due to ongoing injury. |
| Chris Schmidt | Adelaide | 7 October 2011 | Delisted. |
| Jake von Bertouch | Adelaide | 7 October 2011 | Delisted. |
| Lachlan Roach | Adelaide | 7 October 2011 | Delisted. |
| Jay Neagle | Essendon | 8 October 2011 | Delisted. |
| Wayde Twomey | Carlton | 10 October 2011 | Delisted. |
| Joseph Dare | Carlton | 10 October 2011 | Delisted. |
| Jaryd Cachia | Carlton | 10 October 2011 | Delisted. |
| Darren Milburn | Geelong | 11 October 2011 | Retired. |
| Daniel Pratt | North Melbourne | 17 October 2011 | Delisted. |
| Gavin Urquhart | North Melbourne | 17 October 2011 | Delisted. |
| Mark Austin | Carlton | 18 October 2011 | Delisted. |
| Setanta Ó hAilpín | Carlton | 18 October 2011 | Delisted. |
| Troy Taylor | Richmond | 18 October 2011 | Delisted. |
| Pat Contin | Richmond | 18 October 2011 | Delisted. |
| Jamie O'Reilly | Richmond | 18 October 2011 | Delisted. |
| Mitch Farmer | Richmond | 18 October 2011 | Delisted. |
| Ben Nason | Richmond | 18 October 2011 | Delisted. |
| Ben Jaokbi | Richmond | 18 October 2011 | Delisted. |
| Michael Pettigrew | Port Adelaide | 18 October 2011 | Retired will nominate in the pre-season draft. |
| Jason Davenport | Port Adelaide | 18 October 2011 | Delisted. |
| Daniel Motlop | Port Adelaide | 18 October 2011 | Delisted. |
| Paul Bevan | Sydney | 19 October 2011 | Delisted. |
| Max Otten | Sydney | 19 October 2011 | Delisted. |
| Chrissy McKaigue | Sydney | 19 October 2011 | Delisted. |
| Daniel Currie | Sydney | 19 October 2011 | Delisted. |
| Byron Sumner | Sydney | 19 October 2011 | Delisted. |
| Campbell Heath | Sydney | 19 October 2011 | Delisted. |
| Addam Maric | Melbourne | 19 October 2011 | Delisted. |
| Robert Campbell | Melbourne | 19 October 2011 | Retired. |
| Cameron Johnston | Melbourne | 19 October 2011 | Delisted. |
| Tom McNamara | Melbourne | 19 October 2011 | Delisted. |
| Jordan Jones | West Coast | 19 October 2011 | Delisted. |
| Callum Wilson | West Coast | 19 October 2011 | Delisted. |
| James Sellar | Adelaide | 19 October 2011 | Delisted. |
| Myke Cook | Adelaide | 19 October 2011 | Delisted. |
| Will Young | Adelaide | 19 October 2011 | Delisted. |
| James Craig | Adelaide | 19 October 2011 | Delisted. |
| Mark Blake | Geelong | 19 October 2011 | Retired. |
| Michael Quinn | Essendon | 20 October 2011 | Delisted. |
| Rick Ladson | Hawthorn | 20 October 2011 | Delisted. |
| Jordan Williams | Hawthorn | 20 October 2011 | Delisted. |
| Jack Mahony | Hawthorn | 20 October 2011 | Delisted. |
| Riley Milne | Hawthorn | 20 October 2011 | Delisted. |
| Sam Menegola | Hawthorn | 20 October 2011 | Delisted. |
| Will Thursfield | Richmond | 24 October 2011 | Retired. |
| Joseph Daye | Gold Coast | 24 October 2011 | Delisted. |
| Lewis Broome | West Coast | 24 October 2011 | Retired. |
| Clancee Pearce | Fremantle | 26 October 2011 | Delisted. |
| Casey Sibosado | Fremantle | 26 October 2011 | Delisted. |
| Justin Bollenhagen | Fremantle | 26 October 2011 | Delisted. |
| Tom Collier | Brisbane Lions | 28 October 2011 | Delisted. |
| Will Johnson | St Kilda | 28 October 2011 | Delisted. |
| Ryan Gamble | St Kilda | 28 October 2011 | Delisted. |
| Paul Cahill | St Kilda | 28 October 2011 | Delisted. |
| Nicholas Heyne | St Kilda | 28 October 2011 | Delisted. |
| Alistair Smith | St Kilda | 28 October 2011 | Delisted. |
| Brad Ottens | Geelong | 31 October 2011 | Retired. |
| Leon Davis | Collingwood | 31 October 2011 | Retired. |
| Austin Wonaeamirri | Melbourne | 31 October 2011 | Delisted. |
| Brad Dick | Collingwood | 31 October 2011 | Delisted. |
| John McCarthy | Collingwood | 31 October 2011 | Delisted. |
| Daniel Farmer | Collingwood | 31 October 2011 | Delisted. |
| Trent Stubbs | Collingwood | 31 October 2011 | Delisted. |
| Brennan Stack | Western Bulldogs | 31 October 2011 | Delisted. |
| Tom Gordon | Collingwood | 31 October 2011 | Delisted. |
| Declan Reilly | Collingwood | 31 October 2011 | Delisted. |
| Jack Perham | Collingwood | 31 October 2011 | Delisted. |
| Jye Bolton | Collingwood | 31 October 2011 | Delisted. |
| Michael Newton | Melbourne | 31 October 2011 | Delisted. |
| Ben Johnson | Geelong | 4 November 2011 | Delisted. |
| Jack Weston | Geelong | 4 November 2011 | Delisted. |
| Anthony Long | Essendon | 16 November 2011 | Delisted. |
| Jayden Schofield | Western Bulldogs | 30 November 2011 | Delisted. |
| David Gourdis | Richmond | 30 November 2011 | Delisted. |
| Rex Liddy | Gold Coast | 30 November 2011 | Delisted. |

== Mini-draft ==
As part of their entry concessions, Greater Western Sydney was allocated up to four selections in a mini-draft, which could be used to recruit seventeen-year-old players who otherwise would not be eligible for the 2011 National Draft, but who could not play senior AFL football until the 2013 season. Greater Western Sydney were not permitted to use these draft picks directly, but had to trade them to other clubs. In 2011, Gold Coast and Adelaide secured trades with GWS for selections in this draft, leaving two selections remaining for the 2012 AFL draft.

| Pick | Player | Recruited from | League | Club |
|---|---|---|---|---|
| 1 | Jaeger O'Meara | Perth | WAFL | Gold Coast |
| 2 | Brad Crouch | North Ballarat Rebels | TAC Cup | Adelaide |

== 2011 national draft ==
The 2011 AFL National Draft was held on 24 November in Sydney. It was the second time that the draft was held outside of Melbourne, after being held at the Gold Coast in 2010.

Prior to the draft, three players were selected under the Father–son rule. Dylan Buckley, son of Jim was selected by Carlton, Andrew Bews' son Jed was selected by Geelong and Tom Mitchell, son of Barry was selected by Sydney. Buckley and Bews were secured with no rival clubs submitting bids, allowing Carlton and Geelong to each use its final draft selection for the father–son pick. Fremantle submitted a first round bid for Mitchell, which Sydney was able to match, so, Mitchell was drafted with the 21st selection in the draft.

| ^ | Denotes player who has been inducted to the Australian Football Hall of Fame |
| * | Denotes player who has been a premiership player and been selected for at least one All-Australian team |
| ^{+} | Denotes player who has been a premiership player at least once |
| ^{x} | Denotes player who has been selected for at least one All-Australian team |
| ^{#} | Denotes player who has never played in a VFL/AFL home and away season or finals game |
| ^{~} | Denotes player who has been selected as Rising Star |

2011 AFL National Draft
| Round | Pick | Player | Recruited from | League | Drafted to |
|---|---|---|---|---|---|
| 1 | 1 | Jonathon Patton | Eastern Ranges | TAC Cup | Greater Western Sydney |
| 1 | 2 | Stephen Coniglio | Swan Districts | WAFL | Greater Western Sydney |
| 1 | 3 | Dom Tyson | Oakleigh Chargers | TAC Cup | Greater Western Sydney |
| 1 | 4 | Will Hoskin-Elliott | Western Jets | TAC Cup | Greater Western Sydney |
| 1 | 5 | Matt Buntine | Dandenong Stingrays | TAC Cup | Greater Western Sydney |
| 1 | 6 | Chad Wingard | Sturt | SANFL | Port Adelaide |
| 1 | 7 | Nick Haynes | Dandenong Stingrays | TAC Cup | Greater Western Sydney |
| 1 | 8 | Billy Longer | Northern Knights | TAC Cup | Brisbane Lions |
| 1 | 9 | Adam Tomlinson | Oakleigh Chargers | TAC Cup | Greater Western Sydney |
| 1 | 10 | Liam Sumner | Sandringham Dragons | TAC Cup | Greater Western Sydney |
| 1 | 11 | Toby Greene | Oakleigh Chargers | TAC Cup | Greater Western Sydney |
| 1 | 12 | Sam Docherty | Gippsland Power | TAC Cup | Brisbane Lions |
| 1 | 13 | Taylor Adams | Geelong Falcons | TAC Cup | Greater Western Sydney |
| 1 | 14 | Devon Smith | Geelong Falcons | TAC Cup | Greater Western Sydney |
| 1 | 15 | Brandon Ellis | Calder Cannons | TAC Cup | Richmond |
| 1 | 16 | Tom Sheridan | Calder Cannons | TAC Cup | Fremantle |
| 1 | 17 | Clay Smith | Gippsland Power | TAC Cup | Western Bulldogs |
| 1 | 18 | Brad McKenzie | Sturt | SANFL | North Melbourne |
| 1 | 19 | Elliott Kavanagh | Western Jets | TAC Cup | Essendon |
| 1 | 20 | Hayden Crozier | Eastern Ranges | TAC Cup | Fremantle |
| 1 | 21 (F/S) | Tom Mitchell | Claremont | WAFL | Sydney |
| 1 | 22 | Josh Bootsma | South Fremantle | WAFL | Carlton |
| 1 | 23 | Murray Newman | Swan Districts | WAFL | West Coast |
| 1 | 24 | Henry Schade | North Hobart Demons | TSL | Gold Coast |
| 1 | 25 | Sebastian Ross | North Ballarat Rebels | TAC Cup | St Kilda |
| 1 | 26 | Todd Elton | Dandenong Stingrays | TAC Cup | Richmond |
| Priority | 27 | Sam Kerridge | Bendigo Pioneers | TAC Cup | Adelaide |
| Priority | 28 | Fraser McInnes | Perth | WAFL | West Coast |
| Priority | 29 | Alex Forster | Norwood | SANFL | Fremantle |
| Compensation | 30 | Elliot Yeo | East Fremantle | WAFL | Brisbane Lions |
| 2 | 31 | Jackson Merrett | Geelong Falcons | TAC Cup | Essendon |
| 2 | 32 | Joel Hamling | Claremont | WAFL | Geelong |
| 2 | 33 | Bradley Hill | West Perth | WAFL | Hawthorn |
| 2 | 34 | Shane Kersten | South Fremantle | WAFL | Geelong |
| 2 | 35 | Daniel Markworth | Calder Cannons | TAC Cup | St Kilda |
| 2 | 36 | Rory Taggert | North Ballarat Rebels | TAC Cup | Melbourne |
| 2 | 37 | Jack Newnes | Northern Knights | TAC Cup | St Kilda |
| 2 | 38 | Jordan Kelly | Dandenong Stingrays | TAC Cup | Hawthorn |
| 2 | 39 | Michael Talia | Calder Cannons | TAC Cup | Western Bulldogs |
| 2 | 40 | Tom Curran | Oakleigh Chargers | TAC Cup | North Melbourne |
| 2 | 41 | Mitchell Grigg | Norwood | SANFL | Adelaide |
| 2 | 42 | Jimmy Webster | Glenorchy | TSL | St Kilda |
| 2 | 43 | Jordan Lockyer | West Perth | WAFL | Sydney |
| 2 | 44 | Sam Rowe | Norwood | SANFL | Carlton |
| 2 | 45 | Brendon Ah Chee | South Fremantle | WAFL | Port Adelaide |
| 2 | 46 | Nicholas Joyce | Woodville-West Torrens | SANFL | Adelaide |
| 2 | 47 | Patrick Wearden | Murray Bushrangers | TAC Cup | Brisbane Lions |
| 2 | 48 | Jordan Murdoch | Glenelg | SANFL | Geelong |
| 2 | 49 | Daniel Pearce | Oakleigh Chargers | TAC Cup | Western Bulldogs |
| 3 | 50 | Jackson Paine | Sandringham Dragons | TAC Cup | Collingwood |
| 3 | 51 | Nathan Blee | East Perth | WAFL | Port Adelaide |
| 3 | 52 | Josh Tynan | Gippsland Power | TAC Cup | Melbourne |
| 3 | 53 | Alex Woodward | Sandringham Dragons | TAC Cup | Hawthorn |
| 3 | 54 | James Sellar | Adelaide | AFL | Melbourne |
| 3 | 55 | Matthew Arnot | Oakleigh Chargers | TAC Cup | Richmond |
| 3 | 56 | Tom Downie | North Ballarat Rebels | TAC Cup | Greater Western Sydney |
| 3 | 57 | Tory Dickson | Bendigo Bombers | VFL | Western Bulldogs |
| 3 | 58 | Lachie Neale | Glenelg | SANFL | Fremantle |
| 3 | 59 | Nick O'Brien | North Ballarat Rebels | TAC Cup | Essendon |
| 3 | 60 | Jay Lever | Geelong Falcons | TAC Cup | St Kilda |
| 3 | 61 | Alex Brown | Oakleigh Chargers | TAC Cup | Sydney |
| 3 | 62 (F/S) | Dylan Buckley | Northern Knights | TAC Cup | Carlton |
| 3 | 63 | Ashton Hams | (Rookie promotion) | | West Coast |
| 3 | 64 | Cam Ellis-Yolmen | Woodville-West Torrens | SANFL | Adelaide |
| 3 | 65 | Corey Gault | Swan Districts | WAFL | Collingwood |
| 3 | 66 | Lincoln McCarthy | Glenelg | SANFL | Geelong |
| 4 | 67 | Jarrod Witts | Sydney University (NSW Scholarship) | Sydney AFL | Collingwood |
| 4 | 68 | Beau Maister (Note: Maister was known as Beau Wilkes when drafted) | Claremont | WAFL | St Kilda |
| 4 | 69 | Mitchell Golby | (Rookie promotion) | | Brisbane Lions |
| 4 | 70 | Luke Dahlhaus | (Rookie promotion) | | Western Bulldogs |
| 4 | 71 | Cameron Sutcliffe | Woodville-West Torrens | SANFL | Fremantle |
| 4 | 72 | Pass | | | Fremantle |
| 4 | 73 | Matthew Panos | (Rookie promotion) | | Western Bulldogs |
| 4 | 74 | Luke Delaney | (Rookie promotion) | | North Melbourne |
| 4 | 75 | Stewart Crameri | (Rookie promotion) | | Essendon |
| 4 | 76 | Jason Blake | St Kilda (redrafted) | AFL | St Kilda |
| 4 | 77 | Luke Breust | (Rookie promotion) | | Hawthorn |
| 4 | 78 | Orren Stephenson | North Ballarat | VFL | Geelong |
| 5 | 79 | Setanta Ó hAilpín | Carlton | AFL | Greater Western Sydney |
| 5 | 80 | Alik Magin | (Rookie promotion) | | Gold Coast |
| 5 | 81 | Pass | | | Port Adelaide |
| 5 | 82 | Matthew Wright | (Rookie promotion) | | Adelaide |
| 5 | 83 | Nick Lower | (Rookie promotion) | | Fremantle |
| 5 | 84 | Cameron Pedersen | (Rookie promotion) | | North Melbourne |
| 5 | 85 | Nathan Gordon | (Rookie promotion) | | Sydney |
| 5 | 86 (F/S) | Jed Bews | Geelong Falcons | TAC Cup | Geelong |
| 6 | 87 | James McDonald | Old Xaverians | VAFA | Greater Western Sydney |
| 6 | 88 | Alex Sexton | Redland (Zone selection) | NEAFL | Gold Coast |
| 6 | 89 | Aidan Riley | (Rookie promotion) | | Adelaide |
| 7 | 90 | Pass | | | Greater Western Sydney |
| 7 | 91 | Jackson Allen | Morningside (Zone selection) | NEAFL | Gold Coast |
| 8 | 92 | Pass | | | Greater Western Sydney |
| 8 | 93 | Pass | | | Greater Western Sydney |
| 8 | 94 | Pass | | | Greater Western Sydney |
| 8 | 95 | Pass | | | Greater Western Sydney |
| 8 | 96 | Pass | | | Greater Western Sydney |

== 2012 pre-season draft ==
The 2012 AFL pre-season draft was held on 13 December 2011. Zac Dawson, Leon Davis and John McCarthy were considered to be the delisted AFL players most likely to be selected. The changes to the list rules to allow mature age players to be rookie listed has also resulted in less preseason draft selections.

| Round | Pick | Player | Recruited from | League | Drafted to |
|---|---|---|---|---|---|
| 1 | 1 | Pass | | | Greater Western Sydney |
| 1 | 2 | Pass | | | Greater Western Sydney |
| 1 | 3 | Pass | | | Greater Western Sydney |
| 1 | 4 | Pass | | | Greater Western Sydney |
| 1 | 5 | Pass | | | Greater Western Sydney |
| 1 | 6 | Pass | | | Greater Western Sydney |
| 1 | 7 | Aaron Hall | Hobart | TSL | Gold Coast |
| 1 | 8 | John McCarthy | Collingwood | AFL | Port Adelaide |
| 1 | 9 | Brett O'Hanlon | Dandenong Stingrays | TAC Cup | Richmond |
| 1 | 10 | Zac Dawson | St Kilda | AFL | Fremantle |
| 1 | 11 | Fletcher Roberts | Sandringham Dragons | TAC Cup | Western Bulldogs |

== 2012 rookie draft ==
| Round | Pick | Player | Recruited from | League | Drafted to |
|---|---|---|---|---|---|
| 1 | 1 | Sam Frost | Sandringham Dragons | TAC Cup | Greater Western Sydney |
| 1 | 2 | Kyal Horsley | Subiaco | WAFL | Gold Coast |
| 1 | 3 | Darren Pfeiffer | Norwood | SANFL | Port Adelaide |
| 1 | 4 | Justin Clarke | Booleroo Centre/Melrose/Wilmington | NAFA | Brisbane Lions |
| 1 | 5 | Rory Laird | West Adelaide | SANFL | Adelaide |
| 1 | 6 | Jai Sheehan | Geelong Falcons | TAC Cup | Melbourne |
| 1 | 7 | Addam Maric | Melbourne | AFL | Richmond |
| 1 | 8 | Lee Spurr | Central District | SANFL | Fremantle |
| 1 | 9 | Lin Jong | Oakleigh Chargers | TAC Cup | Western Bulldogs |
| 1 | 10 | Max Warren | Eastern Ranges | TAC Cup | North Melbourne |
| 1 | 11 | Lauchlan Dalgleish | North Ballarat Rebels | TAC Cup | Essendon |
| 1 | 12 | Sam Dunell | Bendigo Bombers | VFL | St Kilda |
| 1 | 13 | Shane Biggs | Bendigo Bombers | VFL | Sydney |
| 1 | 14 | Tom Bell | Morningside | NEAFL | Carlton |
| 1 | 15 | Michael Mascoulis | Northern Knights | TAC Cup | West Coast |
| 1 | 16 | Broc McCauley | Brisbane Lions | AFL | Hawthorn |
| 1 | 17 | Lachlan Smith | Murray Bushrangers | TAC Cup | Collingwood |
| 1 | 18 | Cam Eardley | East Fremantle | WAFL | Geelong |
| 2 | 19 | Pass | | | Greater Western Sydney |
| 2 | 20 | Andrew McQualter | St Kilda | AFL | Gold Coast |
| 2 | 21 | Danny Butcher | Gippsland Power | TAC Cup | Port Adelaide |
| 2 | 22 | Stephen Wrigley | Labrador | NEAFL | Brisbane Lions |
| 2 | 23 | Dylan Orval | Oakleigh Chargers | TAC Cup | Adelaide |
| 2 | 24 | Tom Couch | Collingwood (VFL) | VFL | Melbourne |
| 2 | 25 | Ben Darrou | Sandringham Dragons | TAC Cup | Richmond |
| 2 | 26 | Haiden Schloithe | South Fremantle | WAFL | Fremantle |
| 2 | 27 | Tom Campbell | Bendigo Bombers | VFL | Western Bulldogs |
| 2 | 28 | Brad Mangan | Werribee | VFL | North Melbourne |
| 2 | 29 | Cory Dell'Olio | South Fremantle | WAFL | Essendon |
| 2 | 30 | Cameron Shenton | Norwood | SANFL | St Kilda |
| 2 | 31 | Campbell Heath | Sydney | AFL | Sydney |
| 2 | 32 | Nicholas Heyne | St Kilda | AFL | Carlton |
| 2 | 33 | Callum Papertalk | East Fremantle | WAFL | West Coast |
| 2 | 34 | Amos Frank | Woodville-West Torrens | SANFL | Hawthorn |
| 2 | 35 | Marley Williams | Claremont | WAFL | Collingwood |
| 2 | 36 | Jackson Sheringham | Geelong (VFL) | VFL | Geelong |
| 3 | 37 | Pass | | | Greater Western Sydney |
| 3 | 38 | Michael Coad | Gold Coast | AFL | Gold Coast |
| 3 | 39 | Pass | | | Port Adelaide |
| 3 | 40 | Jack Crisp | Murray Bushrangers | TAC Cup | Brisbane Lions |
| 3 | 41 | Tim McIntyre | Sturt | SANFL | Adelaide |
| 3 | 42 | James Magner | Sandringham | VFL | Melbourne |
| 3 | 43 | Steven Verrier | South Fremantle | WAFL | Richmond |
| 3 | 44 | Sam Menegola | Hawthorn | AFL | Fremantle |
| 3 | 45 | Alex Greenwood | Eastern Ranges | TAC Cup | Western Bulldogs |
| 3 | 46 | Malcolm Lynch | Port Melbourne | VFL | North Melbourne |
| 3 | 47 | Mark Baguley | Frankston | VFL | Essendon |
| 3 | 48 | Jordan Staley | Gippsland Power | TAC Cup | St Kilda |
| 3 | 49 | Pass | | | Sydney |
| 3 | 50 | Frazer Dale | Calder Cannons | TAC Cup | Carlton |
| 3 | 51 | Simon Tunbridge | Greater Western Sydney | NEAFL | West Coast |
| 3 | 52 | Andrew Boseley | Geelong Falcons | TAC Cup | Hawthorn |
| 3 | 53 | Trent Stubbs | Collingwood | AFL | Collingwood |
| 3 | 54 | Mark Blicavs | Unregistered player | (Athletics) | Geelong |
| 4 | 55 | Pass | | | Greater Western Sydney |
| 4 | 56 | Pass | | | Gold Coast |
| 4 | 57 | Richard Newell; NSW Scholarship elevation | Brisbane Lions reserves | NEAFL | Brisbane Lions |
| 4 | 58 | Will Young | Adelaide | AFL | Adelaide |
| 4 | 59 | Leigh Williams | Norwood | EFL | Melbourne |
| 4 | 60 | Gibson Turner | Glenelg | SANFL | Richmond |
| 4 | 61 | Jordan Wilson-King | North Adelaide | SANFL | Fremantle |
| 4 | 62 | Jack Redpath | Kyneton | BFL | Western Bulldogs |
| 4 | 63 | Sam Gibson | Box Hill Hawks | VFL | North Melbourne |
| 4 | 64 | Hal Hunter | Calder Cannons | TAC Cup | Essendon |
| 4 | 65 | Darren Minchington | Dandenong Stingrays | TAC Cup | St Kilda |
| 4 | 66 | Pass | | | Sydney |
| 4 | 67 | Matthew Lodge; NSW Scholarship elevation | Riverview | AFL Sydney | Carlton |
| 4 | 68 | Brad Dick | Collingwood | AFL | West Coast |
| 4 | 69 | Adam Pattison | Box Hill Hawks | VFL | Hawthorn |
| 4 | 70 | Daniel Farmer | Collingwood | AFL | Collingwood |
| 5 | 71 | Pass | | | Greater Western Sydney |
| 5 | 72 | Pass | | | Greater Western Sydney |
| 5 | 73 | James Craig | Adelaide | AFL | Adelaide |
| 5 | 74 | Piva Wright | Dandenong Stingrays | TAC Cup | Richmond |
| 5 | 75 | Clancee Pearce | Fremantle | AFL | Fremantle |
| 5 | 76 | Mark Austin | Carlton | AFL | Western Bulldogs |
| 5 | 77 | Gavin Urquhart | North Melbourne | AFL | North Melbourne |
| 5 | 78 | Brendan Lee | East Perth | WAFL | Essendon |
| 5 | 79 | Pass | | | St Kilda |
| 5 | 80 | Pass | | | Sydney |
| 5 | 81 | Caolan Mooney | Down | GAA | Collingwood |
| 6 | 82 | Pass | | | Gold Coast |
| 6 | 83 | Pass | | | Adelaide |
| 6 | 84 | Pass | | | Richmond |
| 6 | 85 | Anthony Long | Essendon | AFL | Essendon |
| 6 | 86 | Pass | | | Sydney |
| 6 | 87 | Michael Hartley; NSW Scholarship elevation | Sydney University | Sydney AFL | Collingwood |
| 7 | 88 | Pass | | | Gold Coast |
| 7 | 89 | Ben Dowdell | Alternative talent | (Basketball) | Adelaide |
| 7 | 90 | John Heslin | Westmeath | GAA | Richmond |
| 7 | 91 | Pass | | | Sydney |
| 8 | 92 | Pass | | | Gold Coast |
| 8 | 93 | Harry Cunningham | Turvey Park | RFNL | Sydney |
| 9 | 94 | Josh Hall | Gold Coast reserves | NEAFL | Gold Coast |
| 9 | 95 | Jack Lynch; NSW Scholarship elevation | Sydney reserves | NEAFL | Sydney |
| 9 | 96 | Sam Michael; Queensland priority selection | Redland | NEAFL | Brisbane Lions |

== Selections by league ==
Draft selection totals by leagues:

| League | National draft | Pre-season draft | Rookie draft | Total | State/territory |
| League | Players selected | | | | State/territory |
|---|---|---|---|---|---|
| TAC Cup | 39 | 2 | 18 | 59 | Victoria |
| WAFL | 14 | 0 | 8 | 22 | Western Australia |
| SANFL | 11 | 0 | 8 | 19 | South Australia |
| VFL | 2 | 0 | 11 | 13 | Victoria |
| NEAFL | 3 | 0 | 7 | 10 | ACT, NSW, NT, QLD |
| TSL | 2 | 1 | 0 | 3 | Tasmania |
| GAA | 0 | 0 | 2 | 2 | Ireland |
| AFL | 3 | 2 | 16 | 21 | Australia-wide |
| AFL rookie elevations | 13 | – | – | 13 | Australia-wide |
| Other leagues | 1 | 0 | 6 | 7 | Victoria, NSW & SA |
| Other sports (excluding Gaelic football) | 0 | 0 | 2 | 2 | N/A |
| Total | 88 | 5 | 78 | 171 | |
