= Jim Buckley =

Australian rules footballer, born 1959

Personal information
- Full name: Jim Buckley
- Born: 27 November 1959 (age 66)
- Original team: Kyneton
- Height: 175 cm (5 ft 9 in)
- Weight: 72 kg (159 lb)
- Position: Centre/Half Forward

Playing career^{1}
Years	Club	Games (Goals)
1976–1990	Carlton	164 (146)
- ^{1} Playing statistics correct to the end of 1990.

Career highlights
- Carlton best and fairest winner, 1982; Premiership player, 1979, 1981 and 1982

Jim Buckley (born 27 November 1959) is a former Australian rules footballer and coach who played in the Victorian Football League (VFL). Buckley is 175 cm tall and came from Kyneton.

Buckley debuted with the Carlton Football Club in 1976 and won the Robert Reynolds Trophy, Carlton's best and fairest award, in 1982. He was a premiership player in 1979, 1981 and 1982. In total, Buckley played 164 games for 146 goals between 1976 and 1990.

On 21 June 1983, when he was 23 years old, Buckley collided with a taxi, killing one of the occupants—passenger Peter Cunningham, a 42-year-old bookmaker's clerk—and injuring others. In April 1984, Buckley was acquitted of all charges despite recording a 0.18 blood alcohol content reading, more than double the legal limit at the time (and more than 3.5 times the current limit of 0.05).

Buckley's only son, Dylan, was recruited to Carlton under the father–son rule after the 2011 AFL season.
