= Jimmy Webster =

Australian rules footballer

Jamie “Jimmy” Webster
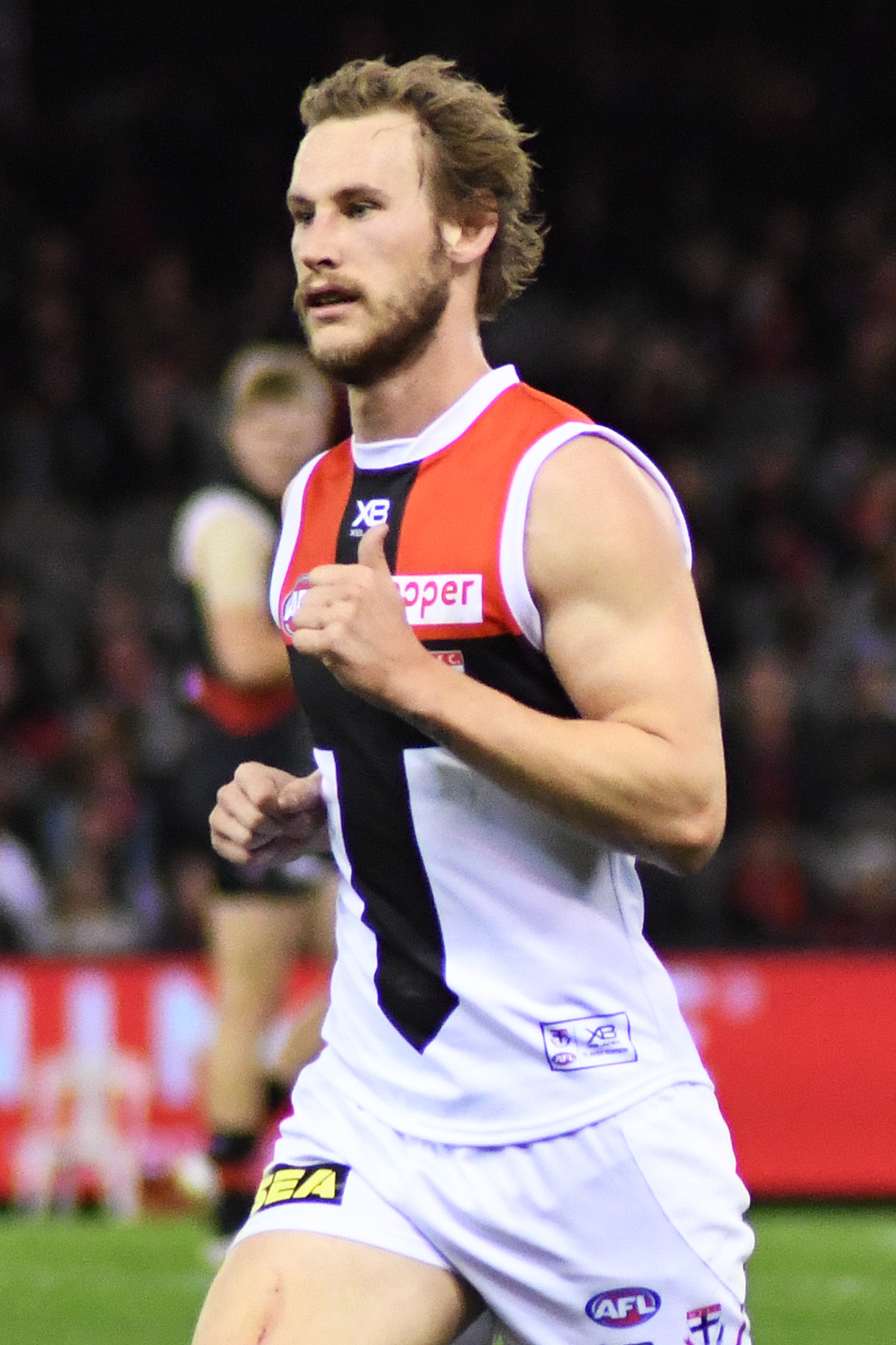
- Webster playing for St Kilda in August 2018

Personal information
- Full name: Jamie “Jimmy” Webster
- Born: 28 June 1993 (age 33)
- Original team: Glenorchy (TFL)
- Draft: No. 42, 2011 National Draft, St Kilda
- Height: 188 cm (6 ft 2 in)
- Weight: 80 kg (176 lb)
- Position: Defender

Playing career
Years	Club	Games (Goals)
2012–2025	St Kilda	180 (4)

Jimmy Webster (born Jamie Webster, 28 June 1993) is a former professional Australian rules footballer who played for the St Kilda Football Club in the Australian Football League (AFL). He was recruited by the club in the 2011 National Draft, with pick #42. Webster made his debut in Round 7, 2013, against Carlton at Docklands Stadium.

In the 2024 preseason, he was suspended for seven matches for rough conduct against North Melbourne's Jy Simpkin.

Webster announced his retirement at the end of the 2025 season, after 14 seasons.

== Statistics ==
Legend
G	Goals	K	Kicks	D	Disposals	T	Tackles
B	Behinds	H	Handballs	M	Marks

Season	Team	No.	Games	Totals							Averages (per game)							Votes
Season	Team	No.	Games	G	B	K	H	D	M	T	G	B	K	H	D	M	T	Votes
2013	St Kilda	29	11	1	0	65	55	120	35	17	0.1	0.0	5.9	5.0	10.9	3.2	1.5	0
2014	St Kilda	29	11	0	1	93	72	165	33	23	0.0	0.1	8.5	6.5	15.0	3.0	2.1	0
2015	St Kilda	29	17	1	2	152	110	262	69	39	0.1	0.1	8.9	6.5	15.4	4.1	2.3	0
2016	St Kilda	29	11	0	0	97	65	162	34	31	0.0	0.0	8.8	5.9	14.7	3.1	2.8	0
2017	St Kilda	29	18	1	0	201	137	338	65	32	0.1	0.0	11.2	7.6	18.8	3.6	1.8	0
2018	St Kilda	29	17	0	0	233	141	374	84	32	0.0	0.0	13.7	8.3	22.0	4.9	1.9	0
2019	St Kilda	29	8	0	0	85	51	136	21	15	0.0	0.0	10.6	6.4	17.0	2.6	1.9	0
2021	St Kilda	29	20	1	0	205	117	322	93	29	0.1	0.0	10.3	5.9	16.1	4.7	1.5	0
2022	St Kilda	29	20	0	0	193	104	297	97	24	0.0	0.0	9.7	5.2	14.9	4.9	1.2	0
2023	St Kilda	29	17	0	0	159	99	258	94	31	0.0	0.0	9.4	5.8	15.2	5.5	1.8	0
2024	St Kilda	29	15	0	0	129	71	200	69	37	0.0	0.0	8.6	4.7	13.3	4.6	2.5	0
2025	St Kilda	29	15	0	0	110	66	176	71	24	0.0	0.0	7.3	4.4	11.7	4.7	1.6	0
Career			180	4	3	1722	1088	2810	765	334	0.0	0.0	9.6	6.0	15.6	4.3	1.9	0
