= Brad McKenzie =

Australian rules footballer

Personal information
- Full name: Brad McKenzie
- Born: 29 May 1993 (age 33)
- Original team: Sturt (SANFL)
- Draft: No. 18, 2011 national draft
- Height: 188 cm (6 ft 2 in)
- Weight: 76 kg (168 lb)
- Position: Midfielder/Defender

Playing career^{1}
Years	Club	Games (Goals)
2012–2016	North Melbourne	37 (6)
- ^{1} Playing statistics correct to the end of 2016.

Brad McKenzie (born 29 May 1993) is a former professional Australian rules footballer who played for the North Melbourne Football Club in the Australian Football League (AFL).

He was drafted with the eighteenth selection in the 2011 AFL draft from Sturt in the South Australian National Football League. He represented South Australia at the 2011 AFL Under 18 Championships and made his league debut for Sturt late in 2011. At the conclusion of the 2016 season, he was delisted by North Melbourne. He now plays for the Norwood Football Club in the SANFL.

== Statistics ==
Legend
G	Goals	K	Kicks	D	Disposals	T	Tackles
B	Behinds	H	Handballs	M	Marks

Season	Team	No.	Games	Totals							Averages (per game)						
Season	Team	No.	Games	G	B	K	H	D	M	T	G	B	K	H	D	M	T
2012	North Melbourne	2	2	0	0	3	3	6	4	0	0.0	0.0	1.5	1.5	3.0	2.0	0.0
2013	North Melbourne	2	10	1	3	67	49	116	33	15	0.1	0.3	6.7	4.9	11.6	3.3	1.5
2014	North Melbourne	2	10	3	0	81	53	134	36	17	0.3	0.0	8.1	5.3	13.4	3.6	1.7
2015	North Melbourne	2	1	1	1	10	8	18	3	2	1.0	1.0	10.0	8.0	18.0	3.0	2.0
2016	North Melbourne	2	14	1	1	152	60	212	52	33	0.1	0.1	10.9	4.3	15.1	3.7	2.4
Career			37	6	5	313	173	486	128	67	0.2	0.1	8.5	4.7	13.1	3.5	1.8
