= Andrew Moody =

English journalist (1960–2021)

Andrew Moody (2 September 1960 – 27 June 2021) was an English journalist and former UK national newspaper journalist specialising in business. He worked as the senior correspondent at China Daily, a Chinese English-language newspaper, where he covered politics, the economy, business, history and culture.

== Early life ==
Moody was born on 2 September 1960 and was brought up in West Stockwith, Nottinghamshire. He attended West Stockwith Primary School and later the King Edward VI Grammar School, Retford. He studied economics at Coventry University graduating with a BA in 1983 before studying journalism at Darlington College of Technology. He had a sister Jayne Graham, who later recalled that his interest in journalism began at age 15, when he became the press officer for a pigeon club.

== Career ==
Moody's career started in regional news as a reporter at the Gainsborough News (which later became the Gainsborough Standard) in 1983, before he moved to the Scunthorpe Star in 1984. In 1985 he was promoted to Group News Editor for the Lincolnshire Standard Group (which owned 20 local titles) before moving to be business correspondent at Gulf News (Dubai). In 1987 he became the business correspondent for the Manchester Evening News before becoming City and Political correspondent at the Daily Express. In 1995 he became a freelance business journalist writing for national newspapers and magazines including the Daily and Sunday Express, Mail on Sunday and The Observer. His interest in China began in the 1990s with a number of assignments to Hong Kong, including covering the handover to China of the British colony in 1997.

In February 2009, Moody became Senior Business Correspondent at China Daily, after covering the 2008 Beijing Olympics. He later became Senior Correspondent Overseas and Global editions. This involves writing for China Daily’s European and Africa Weekly editions, as well as China Watch, which is published in conjunction with The Washington Post, The Wall Street Journal, The Daily Telegraph and publications across the world.

During his time at China Daily Moody wrote 700 front page stories and covered political events including the Two Sessions Meeting, the CPC 19th National Party Congress, the 9th BRICS Summit in Xiamen, the World Economic Forum Summer Davos in Dalian and the High-Level Dialogue and Think Tank Forum: Fighting Against Poverty in Addis Ababa. He has written extensively on the Chinese economy and on China-Africa and China-UK relations. He has also interviewed former UK prime minister Tony Blair and covered the state visits of Chinese President Xi Jinping (including his state visit to the UK in October 2015 and South Africa in December 2015). He interviewed the late prime minister of Ethiopia Meles Zenawi, the former president of Ghana John Mahama and Sierra Leone president Ernest Bai Koroma.

Moody was cited extensively by publications around the world. In February 2020, for example, he interviewed Nobel laureate Michael Levitt. The resulting article was quoted 172 times by international media organisations. He also wrote more than 150 profiles of leading thinkers such as the Harvard historian Niall Ferguson, and Edmund Phelps, the Nobel Prize winner for economics.

The Chinese government named Moody as a 'State High-End Project Foreign Expert'.

== Articles ==
Notable articles Moody has written on China and other subjects include:

- 'National rejuvenation' (5 July 2021)
- 'Leading the way: China set to play crucial role in global recovery, experts say' (10 August 2020)
- 'Huawei issue focuses spotlight on Sino-UK ties' (2 July 2020)
- 'Krugman argues against 'zombies' (12 March 2020)

== Awards ==
In 2019 Moody was given the Order of Friendship (China), the highest award that can be bestowed on a foreign citizen working in China, which was presented by Chinese Vice Premier Liu He in a ceremony at the Great Hall of the People in Beijing on 30 September 2019. The presentation was followed by a reception hosted by Premier Li Keqiang which was broadcast on national Chinese television. Recipients of the award have included Nobel Prize winners and leading scientists, but it is rare for it to be given to someone from the media industry.

== Death ==
Moody died, aged 60, on 27 June 2021 in his Beijing apartment. He had lived with amyotrophic lateral sclerosis for more than three years. After his death, Kerry Brown, a professor of Chinese studies and director of the Lau China Institute at King's College London, said Moody was "committed to communication, to being open-minded and presenting ideas and issues about China in English clearly, so that a wider audience could...engage with them, even if they didn't agree...He will be a huge loss to those who are working hard on the dialogue between China and the outside world." Wang Huiyao, president of the Center for China and Globalization in Beijing, who knew Moody for nearly a decade, referred to him as "Edgar Snow in the New Era". He described him as: "An Englishman who comes a long way to China, strives to report the real China to the world, and finally dies here. I'm greatly touched by his spirit of internationalism."
