= Fletcher Roberts =

Australian rules footballer (born 1993)

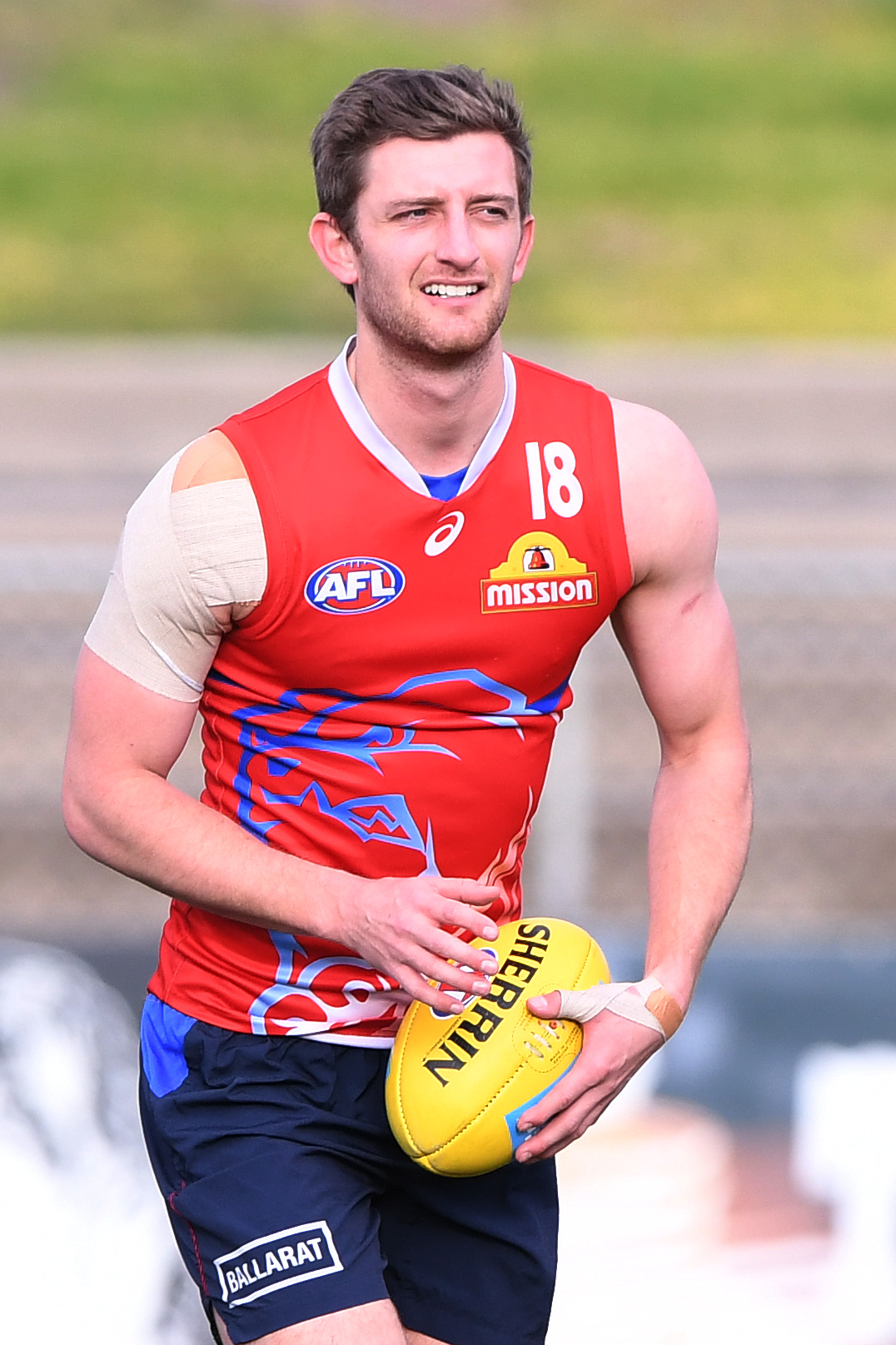
- Roberts in August 2018

Personal information
- Full name: Fletcher Roberts
- Born: 3 June 1993 (age 33)
- Original team: Sandringham Dragons (TAC Cup)
- Draft: No. 11, 2012 pre-season draft
- Height: 196 cm (6 ft 5 in)
- Weight: 92 kg (203 lb)

Playing career^{1}
Years	Club	Games (Goals)
2012–2019	Western Bulldogs	51 (0)
- ^{1} Playing statistics correct to the end of 2019.

Career highlights
- AFL premiership player (2016)

Fletcher Roberts (born 3 June 1993) is a former professional Australian rules footballer who played for the Western Bulldogs in the Australian Football League (AFL).

== Early life ==
Roberts was educated at De La Salle College and Melbourne Grammar School and attracted attention after kicking four goals in the last quarter of the 2011 TAC Cup Grand Final to lead the Sandringham Dragons to victory. He was then recruited by the Bulldogs in the 2012 Pre-season Draft, with pick #11.

== AFL career ==
Roberts made his AFL debut in round 20, 2012, against Richmond at the Melbourne Cricket Ground.

Roberts struggled to hold down a spot in the senior side in 2014, playing only five games, but started to show signs of developing into a tall defender for the Bulldogs' VFL side Footscray. The highlight of the season was in the final round against Richmond's VFL side at Punt Road Oval. Trailing by 33 points in the final quarter, Footscray fought back to snatch the lead, only for the Tigers to steady with a goal and seemingly have the game won. With seconds remaining, Roberts took a pack mark and as the siren sounded, lined up from 60 metres. He kicked truly to give Footscray a memorable three-point victory and secure second place on the VFL ladder. Sadly, Roberts would miss Footscray's 2014 VFL premiership triumph through injury.

In 2016, Roberts was not selected until the Round 6 clash against North Melbourne due to recovery from an injury interrupted pre-season, but would then play 15 of the remaining 16 games during the home-and-away season. He was one of the players dropped for the Elimination Final, but would be recalled for the Preliminary Final to replace the injured Matt Suckling. Despite suffering an early facial injury, Roberts returned to play arguably his best game for the club, holding the dangerous Jeremy Cameron goalless as the Bulldogs advanced to the Grand Final. After some uncertainty early in the week leading up to the Grand Final, it was announced that Roberts retained his place in the team ahead of Suckling, which meant that the Bulldogs would field a team that had no experience in an AFL Grand Final. In the match, Roberts combined with Joel Hamling to shut down Sydney's twin threats of Lance Franklin and Kurt Tippett, limiting their output to just one goal to help the Bulldogs clinch an emotional 22-point win, ending their 62-year premiership drought.

Roberts is currently playing for the Port Melbourne Football Club in the Victorian Football League.

== Personal life ==
Roberts studied a Bachelor of Psychology at Deakin University.

He grew up in the Melbourne suburb of Murrumbeena and played junior football for Murrumbeena Junior Football Club.

== Statistics ==
Statistics are correct to the end of the 2019 season

Legend
G	Goals	K	Kicks	D	Disposals	T	Tackles
B	Behinds	H	Handballs	M	Marks

Season	Team	No.	Games	Totals							Averages (per game)						
Season	Team	No.	Games	G	B	K	H	D	M	T	G	B	K	H	D	M	T
2012	Western Bulldogs	18	2	0	0	16	5	21	7	1	0.0	0.0	8.0	2.5	10.5	3.5	0.5
2013	Western Bulldogs	18	0	—	—	—	—	—	—	—	—	—	—	—	—	—	—
2014	Western Bulldogs	18	5	0	1	19	16	35	10	10	0.0	0.2	3.8	3.2	7.0	2.0	2.0
2015	Western Bulldogs	18	12	0	1	55	61	116	41	19	0.0	0.1	4.6	5.1	9.7	3.4	1.6
2016^{#}	Western Bulldogs	18	18	0	0	72	92	164	47	25	0.0	0.0	4.0	5.1	9.1	2.6	1.4
2017	Western Bulldogs	18	10	0	0	55	40	95	27	13	0.0	0.0	5.5	4.0	9.5	2.7	1.3
2018	Western Bulldogs	18	2	0	0	18	4	22	7	1	0.0	0.0	9.0	2.0	11.0	3.5	0.5
2019	Western Bulldogs	18	2	0	0	10	8	18	4	3	0.0	0.0	5.0	4.0	9.0	2.0	1.5
Career			51	0	2	245	226	471	143	72	0.0	0.0	4.8	4.4	9.2	2.8	1.4

== Honours and achievements ==
AFL

- Team
  - AFL premiership: 2016

VFL

- Team
  - VFL premiership: 2014
