= Billy Longer =

Australian rules footballer

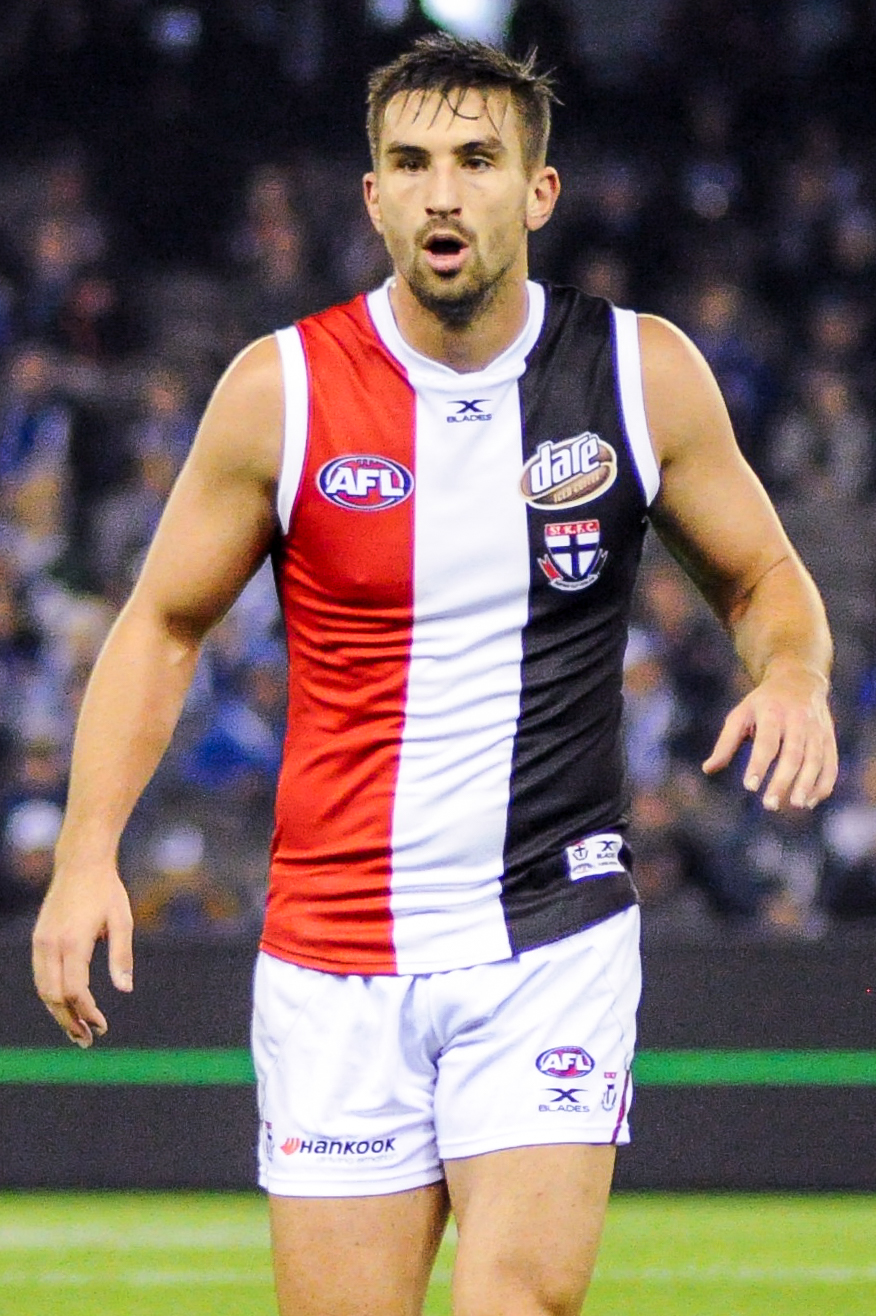
- Longer playing for St Kilda in June 2017

Personal information
- Full name: Billy Longer
- Born: 12 May 1993 (age 33)
- Original team: Northern Knights (TAC Cup)
- Draft: No. 8, 2011 National Draft, Brisbane Lions
- Height: 201 cm (6 ft 7 in)
- Weight: 98 kg (216 lb)

Club information
- Current club: St Kilda
- Number: 18

Playing career^{1}
Years	Club	Games (Goals)
2012–2013	Brisbane Lions	9 (0)
2014–2019	St Kilda	57 (4)
Total		66 (4)
- ^{1} Playing statistics correct to the end of 2019.

Career highlights
- NEAFL premiership player: 2012

Billy Longer is a former Australian rules footballer who played for the Brisbane Lions and St Kilda in the Australian Football League (AFL).

== AFL career ==
Longer was recruited with pick 8 in the 2011 national draft by the Brisbane Lions from the Northern Knights in the TAC Cup under 18s where he played as a ruck. Longer made his debut for Brisbane in round 3 of the 2012 AFL season, against Fremantle.

After two years and nine senior games with Brisbane, Longer announced that he wanted to return to Melbourne to live near family and friends and sought a trade. There was considerable interest from Melbourne-based clubs Hawthorn and St Kilda. Hawthorn dropped their interest after St Kilda traded their ruckman, Ben McEvoy, for draft picks. Seeing the ruck opening, Longer agreed to be traded to St Kilda. Longer played his first game for St Kilda in round 4 of the 2014 AFL season against the Adelaide Football Club.

After playing 34 out of 44 games in 2014 and 2015, Longer lost his place and form and failed to play a senior game in 2016. He returned to senior football in 2017 and set a new St Kilda club record for hit outs in the 2017 AFL season of 656 at an average of 38.59 from 17 games.

Longer retired at the end of the 2019 season after experiencing concussion issues during the year.

== Statistics ==
Statistics are correct to the end of the 2017 season

Legend
G	Goals	K	Kicks	D	Disposals	T	Tackles
B	Behinds	H	Handballs	M	Marks	H/O	Hit-outs

Season	Team	No.	Games	Totals								Averages (per game)							
Season	Team	No.	Games	G	B	K	H	D	M	T	H/O	G	B	K	H	D	M	T	H/O
2012	Brisbane Lions	5	5	0	0	21	16	37	11	15	113	0	0	4.2	3.2	7.4	2.2	3	22.6
2013	Brisbane Lions	5	4	0	1	11	17	28	6	13	70	0	0.3	2.8	4.3	7	1.5	3.3	17.5
2014	St Kilda	18	16	1	1	40	76	116	17	63	414	0.1	0.1	2.5	4.8	7.3	1	3.9	25.9
2015	St Kilda	18	18	1	0	67	100	167	43	48	525	0.1	0	3.7	5.6	9.3	2.4	2.7	29.2
2016	St Kilda	18	0	—	—	—	—	—	—	—	—	—	—	—	—	—	—	—	—
2017	St Kilda	18	17	2	2	24	135	159	27	68	656	0.1	0.1	1.4	7.9	9.4	1.6	4	38.6
Career			60	4	4	163	344	507	104	207	1778	0.1	0.1	2.7	5.7	8.5	1.7	3.5	29.6
