= Joel Hamling =

Australian rules footballer (born 1993)

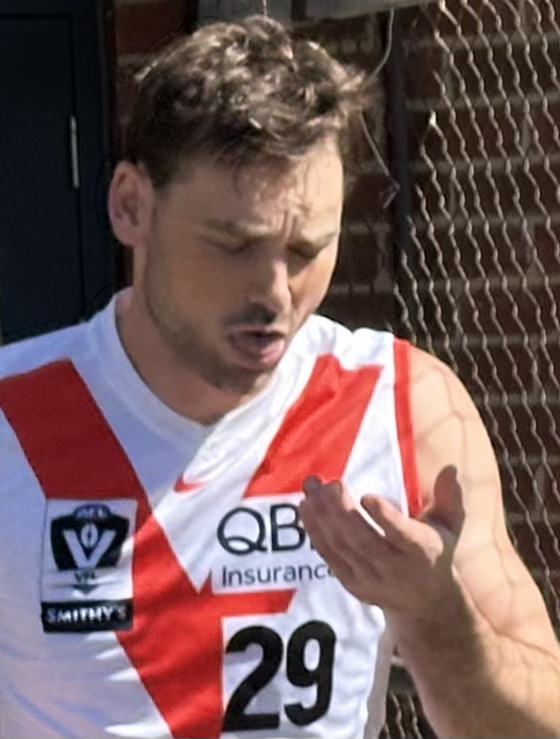
- Hamling in April 2026

Personal information
- Full name: Joel Hamling
- Nickname: Hammer
- Born: 9 April 1993 (age 33); Denmark, Western Australia
- Original teams: Claremont (WAFL); Cable Beach (WKFA)
- Draft: No. 32, 2011 national draft
- Height: 194 cm (6 ft 4 in)
- Weight: 92 kg (203 lb)
- Position: Key defender

Club information
- Current club: Sydney
- Number: 29

Playing career^{1}
Years	Club	Games (Goals)
2012–2014	Geelong	0 (0)
2015–2016	Western Bulldogs	23 (0)
2017–2023	Fremantle	68 (0)
2024–	Sydney	23 (4)
Total		114 (4)

Representative team honours
Years	Team	Games (Goals)
2025	Indigenous All-Stars	1 (0)
- ^{1} Playing statistics correct to the end of round 24, 2025.

Career highlights
- AFL premiership player (2016)

Joel Hamling (born 9 April 1993) is a professional Australian rules footballer playing for the Sydney Swans in the Australian Football League (AFL). Hamling previously played for the Western Bulldogs from 2015 to 2016 and Fremantle between 2017 and 2023, after initially being drafted to Geelong in the 2011 AFL draft.

== Early life and junior football ==
Of Yorta Yorta indigenous descent, Hamling was born in Denmark, Western Australia, but was brought up in Broome. Hamling played colts (Under 18) for Claremont in the WAFL.

== AFL ==
Hamling was recruited by the Geelong Football Club with pick 32 in the 2011 national draft. After three years with Geelong without playing a senior match, he joined the Western Bulldogs as a delisted free agent at the end of the 2014 season. Hamling made his debut in round 9, 2015, against Greater Western Sydney at Etihad Stadium. Hamling was a part of the Western Bulldogs premiership team in 2016. Following the 2016 AFL season he returned home to Western Australia when he was traded to the Fremantle Football Club.

Hamling missed the entire 2020 season due to an ankle injury. Hamling only played one game during the 2021 season after he re-injured the same ankle in round one against Melbourne and had to undergo ankle surgery in July 2021. Hamling made his return in round 2 of the 2022 AFL season during Fremantle's clash against St Kilda.

Following the 2023 AFL season, Hamling signed with the Sydney Swans as an unrestricted free agent.

== Statistics ==
Statistics are correct to the end of 2024

Legend
G	Goals	K	Kicks	D	Disposals	T	Tackles
B	Behinds	H	Handballs	M	Marks

Season	Team	No.	Games	Totals							Averages (per game)							Votes
Season	Team	No.	Games	G	B	K	H	D	M	T	G	B	K	H	D	M	T	Votes
2015	Western Bulldogs	30	11	0	0	64	47	111	53	15	0.0	0.0	5.8	4.3	10.1	4.8	1.4	0
2016^{#}	Western Bulldogs	30	12	0	0	67	59	126	43	16	0.0	0.0	5.6	4.9	10.5	3.6	1.3	0
2017	Fremantle	21	22	0	0	126	142	268	110	42	0.0	0.0	5.7	6.5	12.2	5.0	1.9	0
2018	Fremantle	21	18	0	0	129	114	243	106	21	0.0	0.0	7.2	6.3	13.5	5.9	1.2	2
2019	Fremantle	21	22	0	0	137	97	234	111	25	0.0	0.0	6.2	4.4	10.6	5.0	1.1	0
2020 (Note: The 2020 season was played with 17 home-and-away matches per team (down from 22) and 16-minute quarters with time on (down from 20-minute quarters with time on) due to the impact of the COVID-19 pandemic.)	Fremantle	21	0	–	–	–	–	–	–	–	–	–	–	–	–	–	–	–
2021	Fremantle	21	1	0	0	3	7	10	0	1	0.0	0.0	3.0	7.0	10.0	0.0	1.0	0
2022	Fremantle	21	1	0	0	6	4	10	4	0	0.0	0.0	6.0	4.0	10.0	4.0	0.0	0
2023	Fremantle	21	4	0	0	18	27	45	17	4	0.0	0.0	4.5	6.8	11.3	4.3	1.0	0
2024	Sydney	29	0	–	–	–	–	–	–	–	–	–	–	–	–	–	–	–
2025	Sydney	29	14	3	3	57	49	106	36	19	0.2	0.2	4.1	3.5	7.6	2.6	1.4	
Career			105	3	3	607	546	1153	480	143	0.0	0.0	5.8	5.2	11.0	4.6	1.4	2
