= Adam Hunter (footballer) =

Australian rules footballer (1981–2025)

- Hunter in 2008

Personal information
- Full name: Adam Robert Hunter
- Born: 18 June 1981; Bunbury, Western Australia
- Died: 5 February 2025 (aged 43); Bunbury, Western Australia
- Original team: South Bunbury
- Draft: 29th overall, 1999 national draft (West Coast)
- Height: 190 cm (6 ft 3 in)
- Weight: 92 kg (203 lb)
- Position: Utility

Playing career
Years	Club	Games (Goals)
1999–2011	Swan Districts	64 (76)
2000–2009	West Coast	151 (86)

Career highlights
- West Coast premiership side 2006

Adam Robert Hunter (18 June 1981 – 5 February 2025) was an Australian rules footballer who played for the West Coast Eagles in the Australian Football League (AFL). Hunter was born in Bunbury, Western Australia, and played for Swan Districts in the West Australian Football League (WAFL) before being recruited to West Coast with the 29th pick overall in the 1999 AFL national draft. Playing mainly in defence, though occasionally at centre half-forward, Hunter played a total of 151 games for the club between 2000 and 2009, including the 2006 premiership win.

== Early career ==
Hunter originally played for South Bunbury Football Club in the South West Football League. He joined Swan Districts for the 1999 WAFL season, playing 16 games and kicking 11 goals.

== AFL career ==
Hunter was recruited with the number 29 draft pick in the 1999 National draft by the West Coast Eagles. He made his debut for West Coast in the final game of the 2000 AFL season against Melbourne, gathering three disposals in a game the Eagles lost by 70 points, 26.14 (170) to 15.10 (100). He played a further nine games in 2001.

Hunter played 17 games during the 2002, including the losing elimination final against Essendon, establishing himself in a role in the backline.

In 2005, Hunter established himself as the Eagles' centre half-back, replacing Glen Jakovich, who had retired the previous year, and Quinten Lynch, who had been shifted forward. Hunter played 23 games for the year, including the Grand Final loss to Sydney.

Hunter rated his 2005 qualifying final performance against the Sydney Swans as his career highlight, in which he turned the match around with two goals. He did the same in the 2005 AFL Grand Final, a few weeks later, but Sydney came back and went on to win.

=== Premiership ===
In 2006, Hunter played a key role in the Eagles' backline. Hunter was also often used by coach John Worsfold as a "swingman", being shifted to centre half-forward where he played a key role in the forward line. Hunter kicked 29 goals in 2006 to be third in the Eagles' goal-kicking behind Quinten Lynch (65 goals) and Andrew Embley (31 goals), scoring four goals in a game four times. 11 of these goals were scored in the finals series. Hunter received a single Brownlow Medal vote for his efforts in the Eagles' win over Carlton, where he gathered 18 disposals and kicked 4 goals.

Hunter kicked four goals against the Adelaide Crows, in the preliminary final, which helped get the Eagles to a grand final rematch against the Sydney Swans. He kicked the final goal for West Coast in the 2006 Grand Final, which turned out to be the match-winner for the Eagles.

=== Final years and injury ===
Hunter continued his premiership form in 2007, and was regarded by some as the club's most important player, due to injuries to Chris Judd and Ben Cousins. Hunter once again played every game of the 2007 season.

Due to debilitating knee and shoulder injuries, Hunter missed much of the 2008 and 2009 seasons, playing only 19 games over the two seasons, where he was played more often in the forward line.

There was speculation that Hunter would retire after his 150th game (earning him Eagles life membership) due to his chronic shoulder injury, but this was denied by Hunter and the club. Hunter played his last game for the Eagles in Round 11, 2009 against Geelong, gathering 26 disposals in an Eagles loss, before once again succumbing to his shoulder injury. He announced his retirement from the game at the end of the 2009 season.

=== Comeback ===
Hunter returned to play for his junior club, South Bunbury, in the SWFL, for the 2010 season. Hunter also assumed a role as patron of the South West Academy of Sport's football program. Hunter kicked 47 goals in only seven matches for South Bunbury.

In 2011, Hunter returned to play for Swan Districts in the WAFL.

In 2015, Hunter was nominated to play for the Whitford Warriors in the WAAFL.

== Personal life and death ==
Hunter was fined in court for possessing cocaine in 2014 and was facing domestic violence charges in 2021 before that case was dropped.

Hunter was found dead in Bunbury on 5 February 2025, at the age of 43. His body was discovered just after midnight. It was subsequently reported that police were not treating his death "as suspicious or a suicide" and that a report would be prepared for the coroner. As of August 2025, preliminary coronial findings indicated he died from methylamphetamine-related heart failure.

Hunter's family donated his brain to the Australian Sports Brain Bank for research. He was posthumously diagnosed with chronic traumatic encephalopathy (CTE), with examination of Hunter's brain revealing several lesions consistent with stage 2 CTE.

== Statistics ==
Legend
G	Goals	K	Kicks	D	Disposals	T	Tackles
B	Behinds	H	Handballs	M	Marks

Season	Team	No.	Games	Totals							Averages (per game)							Votes
Season	Team	No.	Games	G	B	K	H	D	M	T	G	B	K	H	D	M	T	Votes
2000	West Coast	39	1	0	0	1	2	3	0	0	0.0	0.0	1.0	2.0	3.0	0.0	0.0	0
2001	West Coast	39	9	0	3	36	27	63	14	4	0.0	0.3	4.0	3.0	7.0	1.6	0.4	0
2002	West Coast	39	17	6	3	140	84	224	53	39	0.4	0.2	8.2	4.9	13.2	3.1	2.3	0
2003	West Coast	39	20	4	8	114	106	220	63	48	0.2	0.4	5.7	5.3	11.0	3.2	2.4	0
2004	West Coast	39	16	1	7	105	98	203	73	39	0.1	0.4	6.6	6.1	12.7	4.6	2.4	0
2005	West Coast	39	23	14	4	178	133	311	135	44	0.6	0.2	7.7	5.8	13.5	5.9	1.9	0
2006	West Coast	39	22	29	13	185	151	336	122	34	1.3	0.6	8.4	6.9	15.3	5.5	1.5	1
2007	West Coast	39	24	14	7	188	268	456	145	53	0.6	0.3	7.8	11.2	19.0	6.0	2.2	1
2008	West Coast	39	11	8	7	72	77	149	69	21	0.7	0.6	6.5	7.0	13.5	6.3	1.9	0
2009	West Coast	39	8	10	9	56	54	110	27	8	1.3	1.1	7.0	6.8	13.8	3.4	1.0	0
Career			151	86	61	1075	1000	2075	701	290	0.6	0.4	7.1	6.6	13.7	4.6	1.9	2
