= Andrew Embley =

Australian rules footballer (born 1981)

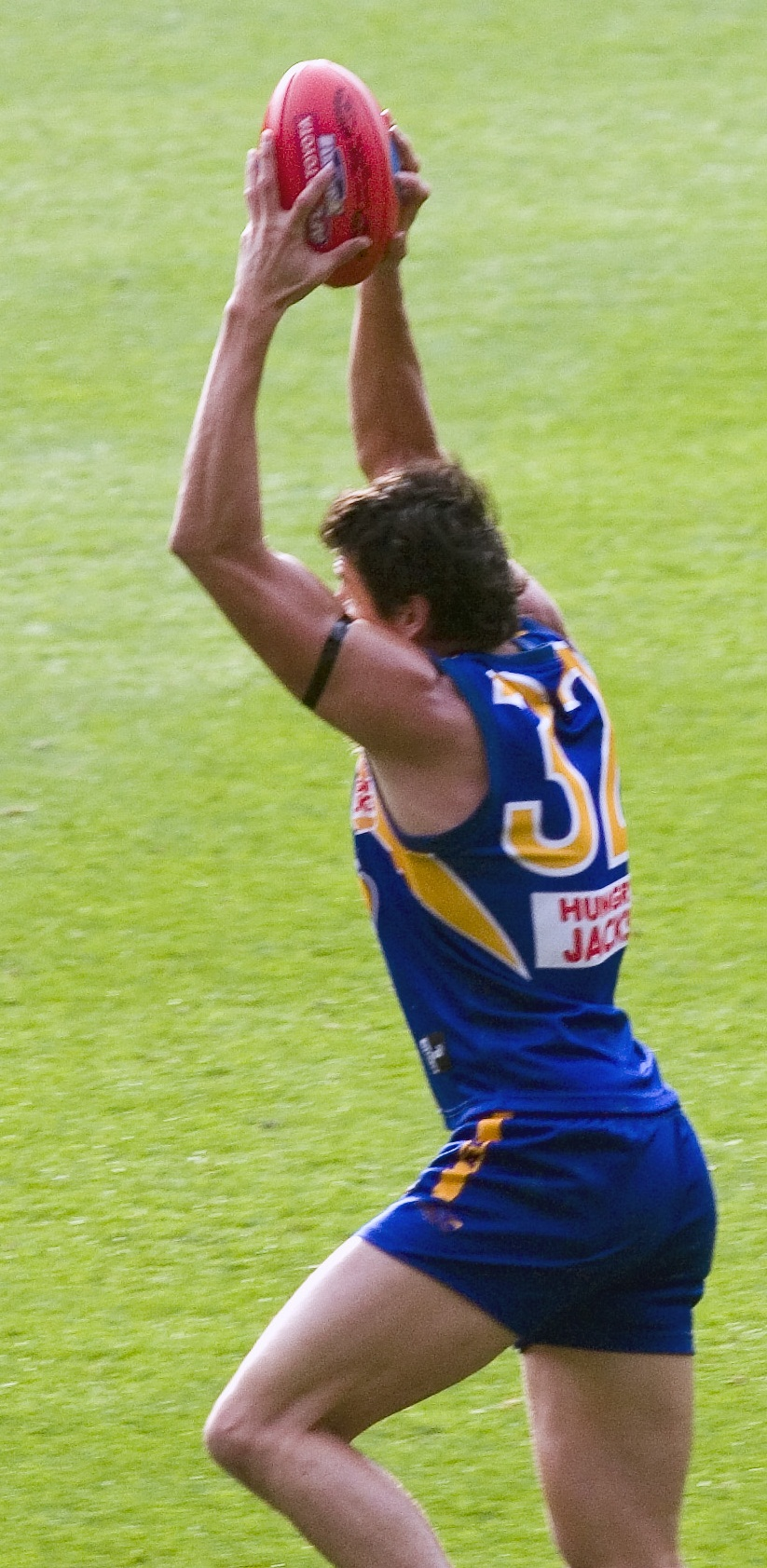
- Embley in the 2005 AFL Grand Final

Personal information
- Full name: Andrew Gerard Embley
- Nicknames: Embers, Whack, Tickets
- Born: 27 June 1981 (age 45); Perth, Western Australia
- Original team: Bassendean JFC
- Draft: 57th pick, 1998 National Draft
- Height: 189 cm (6 ft 2 in)
- Weight: 91 kg (201 lb)
- Position: Wingman

Playing career^{1}
Years	Club	Games (Goals)
1999–2013	West Coast	250 (216)

International team honours
Years	Team	Games (Goals)
2004	Australia	2 (0)
- ^{1} Playing statistics correct to the end of 2013.

Career highlights
- West Coast premiership side 2006; Norm Smith Medal 2006; AFL Rising Star nominee 2000

Andrew Gerard Embley (born 27 June 1981) is a former Australian rules footballer who played with the West Coast Eagles in the Australian Football League (AFL). He is known for winning the Norm Smith Medal as the best player in the 2006 AFL Grand Final.

Embley was born in Perth and began his career with Swan Districts in the West Australian Football League (WAFL). He was recruited by West Coast with the 57th pick in the 1998 National Draft. Embley made his debut in the first match of the 1999 season, and was an AFL Rising Star nominee the following year. In 2004, he represented Australia in the International Rules Series. Embley was one of West Coast's vice-captains between 2004 and 2006, and played a key part in West Coast's victory over Sydney in the 2006 AFL Grand Final. He was awarded the Norm Smith Medal as the best player on the ground. Embley retired at the end of the 2013 season after 250 games for the club. He also kicked 216 goals, finishing second in the club's goal-kicking in 2003 and 2006.

== Early life and family ==
Embley was born in Perth, Western Australia, to parents Maurice and Anne Embley. His father is of Anglo-Burmese and Spanish descent and was born in Rangoon, emigrating to Australia in 1964 with his family after the 1962 Burmese coup and settling in Victoria Park. His mother, originally from Ballarat, is of Italian and Irish descent. His father played reserves football for Perth, and also represented Western Australia in the 1973 national junior athletic championships in Melbourne. Embley's brothers James (17 games) and Michael (8 games) have both played football for the Swan Districts Football Club. Michael Embley also was rookie-listed by West Coast for three seasons from 2004 to 2006, but did not play a senior game for the club. Along with his brothers, Embley attended Trinity College in East Perth, and played junior football for the Bassendean Junior Football Club. He made his WAFL debut for Swan Districts in 1998, and was recruited by the West Coast Eagles with the 57th pick overall in the 1998 National Draft.

== Football career ==
Embley made his debut for West Coast in the first round of the 1999 season, a Western Derby against Fremantle, gathering nine disposals and taking three marks. He played nine games in total for the season, as well as 13 WAFL games for Claremont as part of an affiliation with West Coast which lasted until 2000. Embley played 28 games over the next two seasons, mainly as a half-forward flanker, scoring 29 goals including three four-goal hauls. He was nominated for the 2000 AFL Rising Star for his efforts against Port Adelaide in round 14.

With John Worsfold having replaced Ken Judge as coach of the club prior to the start of the 2002 season, Embley established himself as a regular part of the Eagles' line-up over the next two seasons, playing in losing elimination finals in both the 2003 and 2004 finals series. He kicked 31 goals in 2003 to finish second in the Eagles' goalkicking behind Phil Matera (62 goals). A 25-disposal, four-goal game against Collingwood in round eight, 2003, earned him three Brownlow Medal votes, the first of his career. Embley was named vice-captain of West Coast for the 2004 season, and also represented Australia in that year's International Rules Series. Embley played 18 games for the Eagles in the 2005 season, including all of the Eagles' finals and the Grand Final loss to Sydney. He played 23 out of a possible 24 games in the Eagles' 2006 season, playing mainly across the half-forward line and wings. Embley also kicked 31 goals for the season to be the club's second leading-goalkicker behind Quinten Lynch (65 goals). Despite injuries late in the season, Embley played a key role in the team's successful final series. He averaged 26 possessions and kicked five goals across the Eagles' three finals matches, despite playing the semi-final against the Western Bulldogs with a paralysed vocal chord. He took a game-saving mark in the preliminary final against Adelaide in a game the Eagles won by 10 points. He was awarded the 2006 Norm Smith Medal as the best-on-ground player in the Eagles' Grand Final win over Sydney for his 26-disposal, two-goal effort.

Embley played only 13 out of a possible 24 games during the 2007 season, missing seven games between rounds 6 and 12 and four games at the end of the season due to a hamstring injury. He was dropped as Eagles vice-captain for the 2007 season. Embley played 42 out of a possible 44 games during the 2008 and 2009 seasons in a shift to a more midfield role. He played his 150th game for the Eagles against the Western Bulldogs in Round 6, 2008 in a 60-point loss, earning life membership of the club. He received three Brownlow votes for a best-on-ground performance against the Western Bulldogs in Round 19, 2009, getting 32 possessions and scoring four goals. Embley played 20 games in 2010, including his 200th game in the AFL against Adelaide in Round 10. After a strong pre-season, Embley started the 2011 season with two best-on-ground efforts against North Melbourne and Port Adelaide, receiving some credit for West Coast's strong start to the season after a wooden spoon the previous year. The round eight Western Derby against Fremantle was the only match Embley missed through the entire season, playing 24 out of a possible 25 games, and also recording several personal bests, including career-high numbers in disposals, tackles, and Brownlow votes.

In the 2012 NAB Cup, Embley injured his left shoulder, but played the first two games of the regular season before opting to have surgery, missing much of the Eagles' season as a result. He returned to football via Swan Districts, his first WAFL match since the 2002 season. Having successful tested the durability of his shoulder, Embley returned to West Coast's side for the round 20 match against Geelong, starting as the substitute. He played every remaining game of West Coast's season, recording 22 disposals and four goals in the club's elimination final defeat of North Melbourne. However, in the following week's qualifying final loss to Collingwood, Embley turned the ball over late in the game, resulting in a Collingwood goal, with the Herald Sun describing him as "at one of his lowest ebbs". At the end of the 2012 season, he signed a further one-year extension to his contract with West Coast.

In what was to be his final season at AFL level, Embley was again troubled by injury, straining a hamstring in the NAB Cup and missing another three weeks with a foot injury early in the season. He also struggled for consistency during the season—of his eleven matches during the season, he played three consecutive matches only once. Embley spent portions of the season in the WAFL, averaging 23 disposals over five games for Swan Districts. When he did play for West Coast, he was often used as substitute, especially towards the end of the season. Embley announced his retirement towards the end of the 2013 season, retiring at the same time as Adam Selwood, a premiership teammate. The pair, who had not been regular selections in the team throughout the season, were selected for what was described as "farewell game" in the team's final match of the season, at home against Adelaide. The match was Embley's 250th at AFL level, and he became the seventh West Coast player to reach that milestone.

== Statistics ==
Legend
G	Goals	K	Kicks	D	Disposals	T	Tackles
B	Behinds	H	Handballs	M	Marks

Season	Team	No.	Games	Totals							Averages (per game)							Votes
Season	Team	No.	Games	G	B	K	H	D	M	T	G	B	K	H	D	M	T	Votes
1999	West Coast	32	9	3	1	41	17	58	17	4	0.3	0.1	4.6	1.9	6.4	1.9	0.4	0
2000	West Coast	32	13	10	8	87	42	129	47	19	0.8	0.6	6.7	3.2	9.9	3.6	1.5	0
2001	West Coast	32	15	15	11	94	78	172	60	12	1.0	0.7	6.3	5.2	11.5	4.0	0.8	0
2002	West Coast	32	18	14	12	122	64	186	66	34	0.8	0.7	6.8	3.6	10.3	3.7	1.9	0
2003	West Coast	32	19	31	19	237	105	342	104	28	1.6	1.0	12.5	5.5	18.0	5.5	1.5	5
2004	West Coast	32	17	14	12	211	112	323	89	45	0.8	0.7	12.4	6.6	19.0	5.2	2.6	4
2005	West Coast	32	18	24	21	260	115	375	102	37	1.3	1.2	14.4	6.4	20.8	5.7	2.1	8
2006	West Coast	32	23	31	29	313	130	443	138	33	1.3	1.3	13.6	5.7	19.3	6.0	1.4	5
2007	West Coast	32	13	10	12	166	100	266	65	23	0.8	0.9	12.3	7.7	20.5	5.0	1.8	0
2008	West Coast	32	21	7	13	311	181	492	156	41	0.3	0.6	14.8	8.6	23.4	7.4	2.0	0
2009	West Coast	32	21	16	12	292	180	472	102	53	0.8	0.6	13.9	8.6	22.5	4.9	2.5	4
2010	West Coast	32	20	11	6	264	200	464	105	69	0.6	0.3	13.2	10.0	23.2	5.3	3.5	3
2011	West Coast	32	24	17	19	312	206	518	113	104	0.7	0.8	13.0	8.6	21.2	4.7	4.3	11
2012	West Coast	32	8	6	2	97	42	139	31	16	0.8	0.3	12.1	5.3	17.4	3.9	2.0	0
2013	West Coast	32	11	7	3	101	41	142	34	21	0.6	0.3	9.2	3.7	12.9	3.1	1.9	0
Career			250	216	182	2908	1613	4521	1229	539	0.9	0.7	11.6	6.5	18.1	4.9	2.2	40

== Personal life and post football ==
Embley married Rayne Bryant, the daughter of Kevin Bryant, who played for East Perth and North Melbourne, in December 2006. After 10 years of marriage the couple separated. The couple have three children together, a daughter and two sons.

Embley co-owned restaurant, Beluga, in Claremont, with Dean Cox, which opened in April 2011. He is working with Catalano's Seafood in Perth, in sales and doing regular cooking demonstrations.

Embley is currently part of Triple M Perth Rush Hour Drive show with Katie Lamb and the Triple M Perth AFL call team with Lachie Reid, Dennis Cometti and Xavier Ellis and producer Tom Atkinson.

Embley married Caitlyn Fogarty on 5 November 2021 in Perth. She is the daughter of businessman Brett Fogarty and 2020 West Australian Australian of the Year Annie Fogarty. Fogarty leads the family's Fogarty Foundation supporting education program in Western Australia. In August 2022, the couple announced the birth of their daughter Francesca Anne.
