= Daniel Chick =

Australian rules footballer (born 1976)

Personal information
- Full name: Daniel Patrick Chick
- Born: 10 February 1976 (age 50)
- Original team: East Fremantle (WAFL)
- Debut: Round 1, 1996, Hawthorn vs. Fitzroy, at Western Oval
- Height: 185 cm (6 ft 1 in)
- Weight: 88 kg (194 lb) (playing)

Playing career^{1}
Years	Club	Games (Goals)
1996–2002	Hawthorn	149 (159)
2003–2007	West Coast Eagles	103 (51)
Total		252 (210)
- ^{1} Playing statistics correct to the end of 2007.

Career highlights
- AFL premiership player: 2006; Peter Crimmins Memorial Trophy: 2000; Hawthorn leading goalkicker: 2002; Subiaco premiership player (2008); AFL Rising Star nominee: 1996

Daniel Patrick Chick (born 10 February 1976) is a former Australian rules footballer who played for Hawthorn and the West Coast Eagles in the Australian Football League. Chick is also well known for having a finger amputated in 2002 so he could continue playing football.

== Hawthorn career ==
Daniel Chick was drafted by Hawthorn from East Fremantle with pick #25 in 1995. Hawthorn received the pick from Adelaide in exchange for Darren Jarman. Chick made his debut for the Hawks in Round 1 1996, in a win over Fitzroy. Chick missed only one game in the 1996 season, quickly establishing himself as a tough and versatile half forward, renowned for his strong tackling.

He won the Peter Crimmins Trophy in 2000.

He played in the 2001 Semi Final against Port Adelaide after learning that a relative had been killed in the attack on the World Trade Center.

After Chick's brother Justin died from an allergic reaction Chick felt unsatisfied at Hawthorn and expressed his intentions to return to his home state. Hawthorn traded him to the West Coast Eagles for first round draft pick Luke Brennan (no. 8).

== West Coast career ==
Chick returned to Perth as part of a trade deal to play with West Coast for 2003.

He eventually became a versatile tagger, shutting down many opponents.

However his 2003 season was impaired by anterior cruciate ligament injuries and eventual surgery.

2004 and 2005 were better years where Chick became a key contributor.

Season 2006 included many highlights for Chick, including 5 goals against Essendon in round 8. Chick played a vital role in the 2006 AFL Grand Final win. During the last quarter, Chick smothered an attempted kick by Sydney's Ryan O'Keefe and—via the collection, handball, and shepherd—set up a pivotal Adam Hunter goal.

In September 2007, West Coast released a statement of their intent to delist Chick at the end of October 2007.

== Finger amputation ==
In January 2002, Chick made headlines when he had his left-ring finger surgically amputated following chronic dislocation.

Chick was unaffected by the missing finger throughout the rest of his career.

== Other ==
After it became apparent that no other club would pick Chick up for the upcoming season, effectively terminating his AFL career, he signed with WAFL premiers, Subiaco.

Chick was named in Warwick Cappers "Party" team of the century alongside Ben Cousins, Michael Gardiner, Lance Franklin, Shane Crawford, Jayden Nguyen, Jack Ough, Jason Akermanis and Fraser Gehrig.

In February 2010 Chick was fined $7000 with $1000 costs in the Perth Magistrates Court after pleading guilty to importing performance and image enhancing steroids from Thailand. He was charged after being caught with nine vials and a number of pills of anabolic steroids concealed in his luggage after landing at Perth Airport on 9 October 2009.

In January 2013 Chick launched a Defamation case against AFL and Kim Hagdorn, and Sports News First.

In 2014 Chick represented the Malaysian Warriors Australian Rules Football Club within the AFL Asia competition, with his debut against Vietnam resulting in one goal.

== Statistics ==
Legend
G	Goals	K	Kicks	D	Disposals	T	Tackles
B	Behinds	H	Handballs	M	Marks

Season	Team	No.	Games	Totals							Averages (per game)						
Season	Team	No.	Games	G	B	K	H	D	M	T	G	B	K	H	D	M	T
1996	Hawthorn	27	22	14	5	153	102	255	59	43	0.6	0.2	7.0	4.6	11.6	2.7	2.0
1997	Hawthorn	17	21	28	20	150	69	219	57	58	1.3	1.0	7.1	3.3	10.4	2.7	2.8
1998	Hawthorn	17	20	26	9	173	90	263	50	64	1.3	0.5	8.7	4.5	13.2	2.5	3.2
1999	Hawthorn	17	20	25	13	149	80	229	44	36	1.3	0.7	7.5	4.0	11.5	2.2	1.8
2000	Hawthorn	17	24	11	3	265	121	386	84	87	0.5	0.1	11.0	5.0	16.1	3.5	3.6
2001	Hawthorn	17	20	24	10	220	91	311	57	79	1.2	0.5	11.0	4.6	15.6	2.9	4.0
2002	Hawthorn	17	22	31	17	178	83	261	47	104	1.4	0.8	8.1	3.8	11.9	2.1	4.7
2003	West Coast	17	18	12	10	155	72	227	45	86	0.7	0.6	8.6	4.0	12.6	2.5	4.8
2004	West Coast	17	18	6	2	107	94	201	30	52	0.3	0.1	5.9	5.2	11.2	1.7	2.9
2005	West Coast	17	25	14	5	189	107	296	66	84	0.6	0.2	7.6	4.3	11.8	2.6	3.4
2006	West Coast	17	23	14	5	132	108	240	47	71	0.6	0.2	5.7	4.7	10.4	2.0	3.1
2007	West Coast	17	19	5	3	96	128	224	41	61	0.3	0.2	5.1	6.7	11.8	2.2	3.2
Career			252	210	102	1967	1145	3112	627	825	0.8	0.4	7.8	4.5	12.3	2.5	3.3
