= Dean Cox =

Australian rules footballer (born 1981)

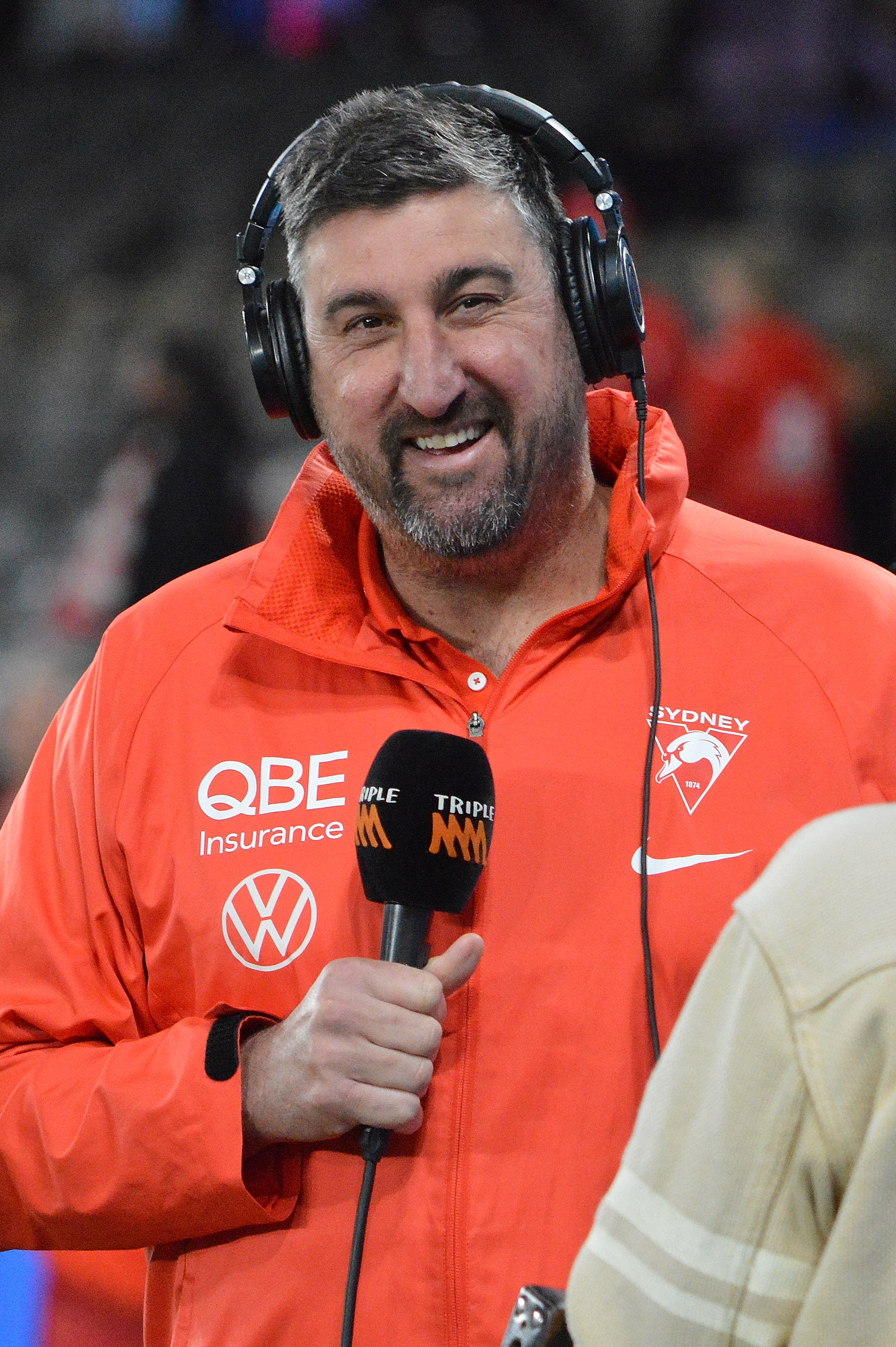
- Cox with Sydney in August 2026

Personal information
- Full name: Dean Michael Cox
- Nickname: Coxy
- Born: 1 August 1981 (age 45)
- Original team: Dampier Sharks
- Draft: 28th overall, 2000 Rookie Draft
- Height: 204 cm (6 ft 8 in)
- Weight: 107 kg (236 lb)
- Position: Ruckman

Playing career^{1}
Years	Club	Games (Goals)
2001–2014	West Coast	290 (169)

Representative team honours
Years	Team	Games (Goals)
2008	Dream Team	1 (0)

Coaching career^{3}
Years	Club	Games (W–L–D)
2025–	Sydney	48 (31–17–0)
2026	Representative; Western Australia	1 (0–1–0)
- ^{1} Playing statistics correct to the end of the 2014 season.^{3} Coaching statistics correct as of preliminary finals, 2026.

Career highlights
- West Coast Premiership side: 2006; 6x All-Australian team: 2005, 2006, 2007, 2008, 2011, 2012; Ross Glendinning Medal: 2011; West Coast Best Clubman Award: 2006; West Coast Best and Fairest: 2008; Australian Football Hall of Fame inductee (2020); East Perth Premiership side: 2000; Simpson Medal: 2000

Dean Michael Cox (born 1 August 1981) is a retired Australian rules footballer and the current senior coach of the Sydney Swans in the Australian Football League (AFL). After winning the Simpson Medal with East Perth in the 2000 WAFL premiership, Cox debuted in the AFL with the West Coast Eagles in 2001. A ruckman, Cox was named in the All-Australian team six times, including four seasons consecutively from 2005 to 2008. In 2006, he played in West Coast's premiership side and in 2008 he won West Coast's best and fairest award. Cox retired at the end of the 2014 season, finishing his career with 290 games, a club record, and 169 goals.

Cox joined the Swans as an assistant coach in 2017, and succeeded John Longmire as senior men's coach in November 2024.

== Early career ==
Cox hails from Dampier, Western Australia, where he played for the Dampier Sharks.

His uncle George Michalczyk, a former Australian rules player himself, recommended Cox to the club he began his senior career with, East Perth.

Cox played colts for East Perth in 1999 and at the end of the season was invited to train with the West Coast Eagles in their pre-season. He impressed enough for him to be rookie-listed in the 2000 Rookie Draft. In 2000, he continued to play for East Perth's senior side in the WAFL, where he won the Simpson Medal in leading the club to the WAFL premiership.

== AFL playing career ==
=== West Coast Eagles ===
The Eagles put Cox on their senior list and he made his AFL debut in 2001.

=== 2005 season ===
He came of age during the 2005 season, where he became a dominant player for the Eagles.

He topped the year off with a terrific finals series, living up to his high standards. Two incidents stand out in particular for Cox – one where in the Qualifying Final against Sydney he took two saving marks in defence to secure the game in the dying moments, where his team got home by less than a goal. The other moment that stands out had the Eagles on the other end, where in the Grand Final three weeks later, also against Sydney, he took a strong mark on the half-forward line and speared the ball in towards a pack in the dying moments. Leo Barry took the game-saving mark from the kick, which secured the Swans a victory by less than a goal.

=== 2006 season ===
Cox got off to a superb start to the season and was one of the premier players in the competition early. He continued his good form and established himself as one of the league's premier ruckmen, averaging over 20 hitouts and almost 20 disposals per game through Round 8 of the 2006 Season. However, in Round 13 he collided with a hard bump from Bulldog Adam Cooney, which left him with a broken collar bone. Cox returned to the side, and was a key figure in the Eagles thrilling 1 point win of Sydney in the 2006 AFL Grand Final, where he dominated against Sydney ruckman Stephen Doyle and Darren Jolly. Cox played 21 games in 2006, taking 141 marks and kicking 14 goals.

=== 2007–2014 ===
Cox played 21 games in 2007 and all 22 in 2008 as the club missed the finals, in what was a turbulent few years. The departure of Ben Cousins and Chris Judd (Carlton) and questions surrounding the clubs culture meant that Cox had to step up. Many thought he would be appointed Captain for 2008, but the position was awarded to Darren Glass. Cox made the All-Australian Team in both of these years, continuing to be the dominant ruckman of the competition despite playing in a struggling side (mostly in 2008). He also did no harm to his reputation as a ruckman/midfielder, collecting 25 disposals or more 5 times in 2007, and 7 times in 2008, and regularly featuring among the best. Standout games included the Semi-Final against Collingwood in 2007 that went to extra time (which West Coast lost), where Cox collected 27 disposals, 9 marks, 29 hitouts and a goal. In Round 10 of 2008 against Collingwood, again an Eagles loss, Cox gathered 30 disposals, 7 marks, 36 hitouts and kicked two goals.

Cox finished his career with 6,628 hitouts, an AFL record at the time of his retirement.

== AFL coaching career ==
=== Sydney Swans ===
Cox joined the Sydney Swans as an assistant coach under senior coach John Longmire at the end of the 2017 season. On 26 November 2024, two months after the club suffered a 60-point loss to Brisbane Lions in the Grand Final, the club announced Longmire's resignation as senior coach and that Longmire would hand the senior coach role to assistant coach Cox, who became the 46th senior coach of the Sydney Swans.

== Playing statistics ==
Legend
G	Goals	K	Kicks	D	Disposals	T	Tackles
B	Behinds	H	Handballs	M	Marks	H/O	Hit-outs

Season	Team	No.	Games	Totals								Averages (per game)							
Season	Team	No.	Games	G	B	K	H	D	M	T	H/O	G	B	K	H	D	M	T	H/O
2001	West Coast	20	17	2	2	62	69	131	38	18	184	0.1	0.1	3.6	4.1	7.7	2.2	1.1	10.8
2002	West Coast	20	19	7	1	96	97	193	82	17	307	0.4	0.1	5.1	5.1	10.2	4.3	0.9	16.2
2003	West Coast	20	19	10	3	125	88	213	74	12	332	0.5	0.2	6.6	4.6	11.2	3.9	0.6	17.5
2004	West Coast	20	23	5	10	172	142	314	117	37	512	0.2	0.4	7.5	6.2	13.7	5.1	1.6	22.3
2005	West Coast	20	25	22	3	257	152	409	163	29	595	0.9	0.1	10.3	6.1	16.4	6.5	1.2	23.8
2006	West Coast	20	21	14	9	233	146	379	141	27	449	0.7	0.4	11.1	7.0	18.0	6.7	1.3	21.4
2007	West Coast	20	21	13	9	234	163	397	155	23	449	0.6	0.4	11.1	7.8	18.9	7.4	1.1	21.4
2008	West Coast	20	22	9	10	233	253	486	126	34	571	0.4	0.5	10.6	11.5	22.1	5.7	1.5	26.0
2009	West Coast	20	13	8	7	139	145	284	75	23	346	0.6	0.5	11.2	10.7	21.8	5.8	1.8	26.6
2010	West Coast	20	22	10	9	178	194	372	91	37	502	0.5	0.4	8.1	8.8	16.9	4.1	1.7	22.8
2011	West Coast	20	25	20	17	270	176	446	137	43	716	0.8	0.7	10.8	7.0	17.8	5.5	1.7	28.6
2012	West Coast	20	24	28	14	238	147	385	144	39	628	1.2	0.6	9.9	6.1	16.0	6.0	1.6	26.2
2013	West Coast	20	22	13	18	209	140	349	118	52	597	0.6	0.8	9.5	6.4	15.9	5.4	2.4	27.1
2014	West Coast	20	17	8	6	142	103	245	80	39	405	0.5	0.4	8.4	6.1	14.4	4.7	2.3	23.8
Career			290	169	118	2588	2015	4603	1541	430	6628	0.6	0.4	8.9	7.0	15.9	5.3	1.5	22.9

== Coaching statistics ==
Statistics are correct to end of preliminary finals, 2026.

Team	Year	Home and Away Season					Finals			
Team	Year	Won	Lost	Drew	Win %	Position	Won	Lost	Win %	Result
SYD	2025	12	11	0	.522	10th out of 18	-	-	-	-
SYD	2026	18	5	0	.783	2nd out of 18	1	1	.500	Lost Preliminary Final to Fremante
Total		30	16	0	.652		1	1	.500	

== Personal life ==
Cox married Kerry Lavell at a ceremony at Leeuwin Estate in Margaret River in December 2011, having dated her for three years previously. Outside of football, Cox co-owned a seafood restaurant, Beluga, in Claremont, with Andrew Embley, which opened in April 2011 and closed in 2015.

In December 2012, Cox and his wife Kerry's first child was born.

Sporting positions
Preceded by John Longmire	Coach of the Sydney Swans; 2025–current	Succeeded by Incumbent
