= Robert Doyle (footballer) =

Australian rules footballer

Personal information
- Full name: Robert E. Doyle
- Born: 14 January 1951 (age 75)
- Original team: South Melbourne U-19s
- Height: 196 cm (6 ft 5 in)
- Weight: 97 kg (214 lb)

Playing career^{1}
Years	Club	Games (Goals)
1969–1975	South Melbourne	77 (36)
- ^{1} Playing statistics correct to the end of 1975.

Robert Doyle (born 14 January 1951) is a former Australian rules footballer who played with South Melbourne in the Victorian Football League (VFL).

Doyle, a ruckman, was a South Melbourne player from under-19 level and made his senior debut in 1969. Also used in key positions, Doyle had his most productive season in 1973 when he played 20 games. Playing as a forward against North Melbourne at Arden Street Oval in 1974, Doyle kicked a career high five goals, but was overshadowed by Sam Kekovich, who kicked 10 majors. He appeared in the opening seven rounds of the 1975 VFL season and then transferred to Port Melbourne to play out the year.

Due to his work, Doyle moved to Adelaide in 1976 and began playing for SANFL club South Adelaide. It was from South Adelaide that his son Stephen would be drafted to the Sydney Swans, as a father–son selection.
