= 2006 AFL Grand Final =

Grand final of the 2006 Australian Football League season

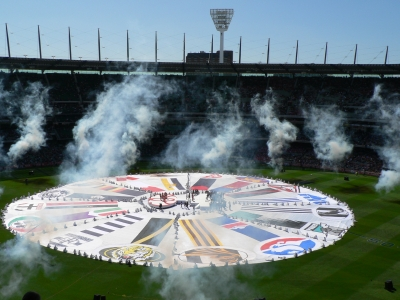
- Pre-match entertainment before the game. Giant banners were unfurled featuring the colours and emblems of all 16 clubs of the 2006 AFL premiership season.

Sydney	West Coast
12.12 (84)	12.13 (85)
	1	2	3	4
WCE	4.2 (26)	8.7 (55)	10.10 (70)	12.13 (85)
SYD	1.4 (10)	4.6 (30)	8.11 (59)	12.12 (84)
- Date: 30 September 2006
- Stadium: Melbourne Cricket Ground
- Attendance: 97,431
- Favourite: West Coast
- Umpires: Michael Vozzo (2), Brett Allen (10), Darren Goldspink (32)
- Coin toss won by: West Coast
- Kicked toward: City End

Ceremonies
- Pre-match entertainment: Brian Mannix, John Paul Young, Sean Kelly, Daryl Braithwaite, Shane Howard and Irene Cara
- National anthem: Brian Mannix, John Paul Young, Daryl Braithwaite and Shane Howard

Accolades
- Norm Smith Medallist: Andrew Embley (West Coast)
- Jock McHale Medallist: John Worsfold

Broadcast in Australia
- Network: Network 10
- Commentators: Stephen Quartermain (Host); Anthony Hudson (Commentator); Robert Walls (Expert Commentator); Malcolm Blight (Expert Commentator); Neil Cordy (Boundary Rider); Tim Gossage (Boundary Rider)

The 2006 AFL Grand Final was an Australian rules football game contested between the Sydney Swans and West Coast Eagles, held at the Melbourne Cricket Ground in Melbourne on 30 September 2006. It was the 110th annual grand final of the Australian Football League (formerly the Victorian Football League), staged to determine the premiers for the 2006 AFL season. The match, attended by 97,431 spectators, was won by West Coast by a thrilling one point, earning the club its third premiership.

== Background ==
This was the second consecutive year that these two teams played in the premiership decider, with the Swans having won the 2005 AFL Grand Final by a margin of 4 points. At the conclusion of the home and away season, West Coast had finished first on the AFL ladder with 17 wins and 5 losses, winning the McClelland Trophy. Sydney had finished fourth with 14 wins and 8 losses.

In the week leading up to the grand final, Sydney's Adam Goodes was awarded the Brownlow Medal.

== Pre-match entertainment ==
Prior to the match, at 10:00 a.m. the TAC Cup grand final was played.

The Red Berets parachuted into the MCG delivering the match balls, followed by a team warm up and the beginning of pre-match entertainment. The entertainment included a performance of the song "Flashdance (What A Feeling)", performed by Irene Cara, as well as appearances from Brian Mannix, John Paul Young, Daryl Braithwaite and Shane Howard (lead singer of Goanna). The medley of songs they performed included "Solid Rock", Yesterday's Hero", "The Horses", "Everybody Wants to Work" and "I Hear Motion".

== Match summary ==
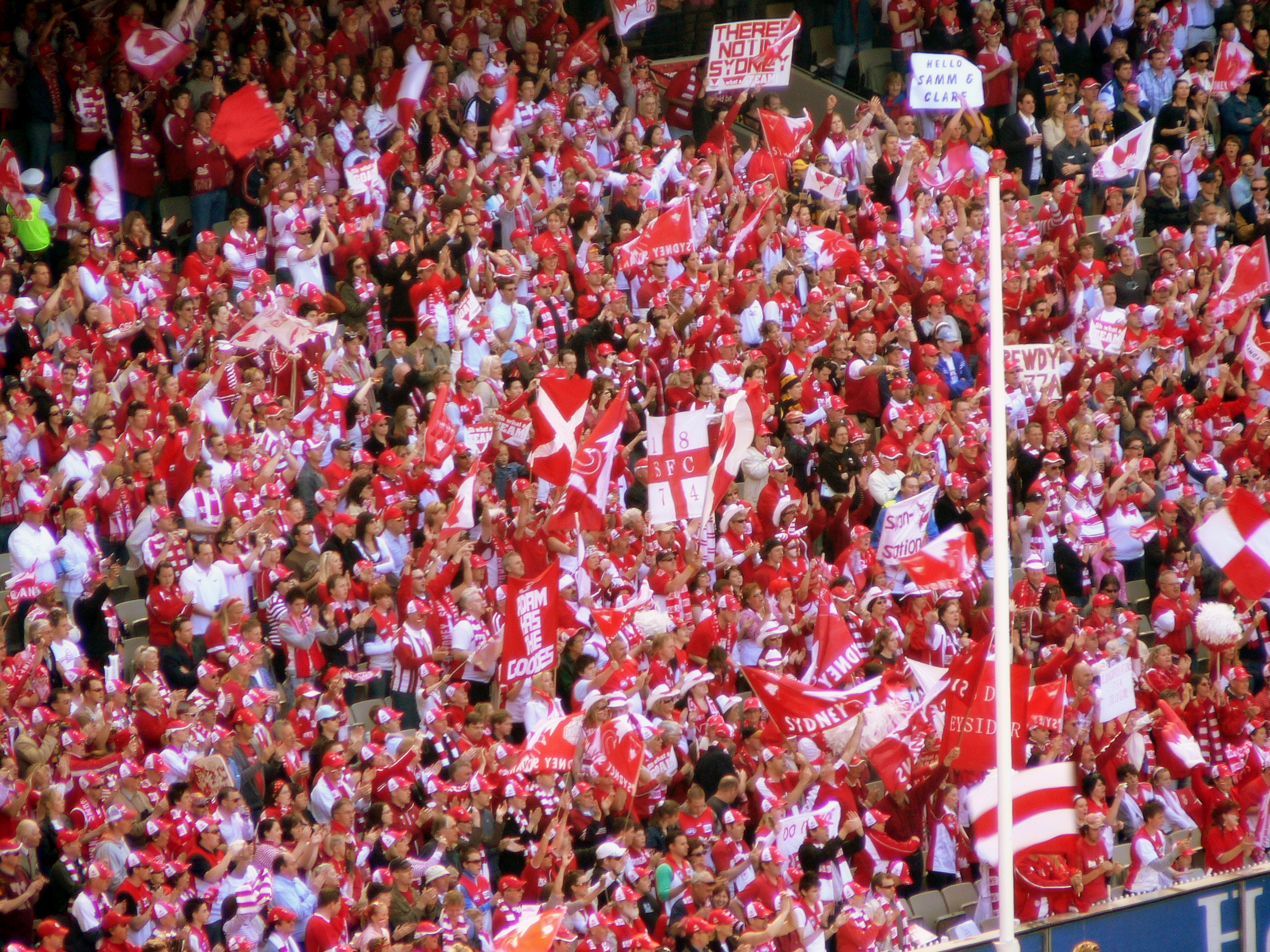
The Sydney cheer squad celebrate a goal

West Coast started the better, and outplayed the Swans in the first half and led by a convincing 25 points at half time. The Swans fought back in the third quarter and the margin was just 11 points at 3/4 time. Goodes goaled within the first 15 seconds of the last quarter and the margin was suddenly less than a kick. It was goal-for-goal in one of the most intense final quarters of modern grand final history, with West Coast hanging on by a single point to win its first premiership since 1994 and avenge its heartbreaking four-point loss to the Swans in the previous year's grand final.

It was the fifth consecutive match between the two teams to be decided by less than a goal, and the first grand final to be decided by a point since St Kilda defeated Collingwood in the 1966 VFL Grand Final. The match has been labelled as a 'classic'.

=== Grand Final Sprint ===
The Grand Final Sprint, which had heats ran before the pre-match entertainment and the final ran during the half-time break, was won by Carlton's Brendan Fevola. The 2006 Grand Final saw the first use of handicaps during the sprint.

== Norm Smith Medal ==
Norm Smith Medal voting tally
Position	Player	Club	Total votes	Vote summary
1st (winner)	Andrew Embley	West Coast Eagles	10	3,3,3,1
2nd	Brett Kirk	Sydney Swans	8	2,2,2,2
3rd	Dean Cox	West Coast Eagles	6	3,1,1,1
4th	Daniel Kerr	West Coast Eagles	3	3
5th	Tadhg Kennelly	Sydney Swans	2	2
6th	Beau Waters	West Coast Eagles	1	1

Andrew Embley was awarded the Norm Smith Medal for being judged the best player afield. He recorded 26 disposals, 6 marks, and 2 goals. Also polling votes were Brett Kirk (27 disposals and 9 tackles), Dean Cox (20 disposals and 34 hitouts), Daniel Kerr (20 disposals and 5 tackles), Tadhg Kennelly (21 disposals), and Beau Waters (26 disposals and 10 marks).

The voters and their choices were as follows:

Voter	Role	3 votes	2 votes	1 vote
Rohan Connolly	The Age	Andrew Embley	Brett Kirk	Dean Cox
Mark Maclure	ABC	Daniel Kerr	Brett Kirk	Dean Cox
Jenny McAsey	The Australian	Andrew Embley	Brett Kirk	Dean Cox
Mike Sheahan	Herald Sun	Andrew Embley	Tadhg Kennelly	Beau Waters
Ray Wilson	The West Australian	Dean Cox	Brett Kirk	Andrew Embley

== Match scoring records ==
The 2006 grand final placed Sydney vs West Coast games further in the VFL/AFL record books for closeness, with the five most recent margins up to and including this game standing at 4, 4, 2, 1 and 1. With 12 points' total difference across five games, Sydney vs West Coast comprehensively beat the previous five-game record of 19 points, set by Hawthorn versus Collingwood in 1958–60. They also became the seventh pair of teams in VFL/AFL history (and the second in 2006 after Geelong vs Western Bulldogs) to contest two consecutive one-point games.

These records were further improved in the grand final rematch in Round 1, 2007, which was again decided by a single point, giving the pair the record for four games, five games and six games (5 points, 9 points and 13 points, respectively), and positioning them equal second for three games behind Brisbane vs Port Adelaide (2 points, 1997–98) and Hawthorn vs Footscray (3 points, 1956–57).

== Scorecard ==
Grand final
Saturday, 30 September (2:30 pm)	Sydney	def. by	West Coast	MCG (crowd: 97,431)
1.4 (10); 4.6 (30); 8.11 (59); 12.12 (84)	Q1; Q2; Q3; Final	4.2 (26); 8.7 (55); 10.10 (70); 12.13 (85)	Umpires: Vozzo, Allen, Goldspink; Norm Smith Medal: Andrew Embley (West Coast); Television broadcast: Network 10; National anthem: Brian Mannix, John Paul Young, Daryl Braithwaite and Shane Howard
O'Loughlin, Davis 3 Mathews, Roberts-Thomson, Goodes, Schneider, O'Keefe, Malceski 1	Goals	3 Lynch; 2 Embley, Hansen, Cousins; 1 Judd, Armstrong, Hunter
Fosdike, Richards, Kennelly, O'Loughlin, McVeigh, Kirk, Goodes	Best	Embley, Chick, Judd, Glass, Lynch, Selwood, Braun, Cox, Cousins, Kerr
Ablett (shoulder)	Injuries	Nil
Nil	Reports	Nil

== Post-match presentation ==
The post-match presentation was carried out by Craig Willis. The Jock McHale Medal was presented by former St. Kilda and Hawthorn Premiership coach Allan Jeans to the 2006 Premiership coach John Worsfold. The Norm Smith Medal was presented by former Essendon player and 1984 winner Billy Duckworth to 2006 winner Andrew Embley. The premiership cup was presented by former West Coast Eagle two-time premiership player Glen Jakovich.

== International telecasts ==
The following television networks covered the event:

- Papua New Guinea – EM TV, Australia Network
- New Zealand – SKY Sport 1
- Southeast Asia – Australia Network
- Middle East – Australia Network
- Israel – Fox Sports Israel
- Indian subcontinent – Australia Network
- North America/United States – Setanta Sports North America, MHz Worldview
- Canada – Fox Sports World Canada
- United Kingdom – British Sky Broadcasting
- Ireland – TG4
- Spain – Canal+ Spain

== Grand final week ==
=== Brownlow Medal ===
The 2006 Charles Brownlow Medal Presentation was held at the Palladium at Crown Casino, Melbourne, on 25 September 2006. The Charles Brownlow Medal is awarded to the "Best and Fairest" AFL Player of the year. It is selected by a 3–2–1 voting system awarded by the umpires of each match for the whole year (excluding finals and pre-season). The winner of the 2006 Brownlow Medal was Adam Goodes, the Sydney Swans utility who was playing in the grand final later that week. It was his second and final Brownlow Medal of his career.

2006 Charles Brownlow Medal Results
Place	Player	Votes
1st	Adam Goodes	26
2nd	Scott West	23
3rd	Chris Judd	21

=== Grand final parade ===
The grand final parade took place on Friday 29 September 2006 and commenced on St Kilda Road, and ending at Spring Street. The crowd was officially estimated at fifty thousand people.

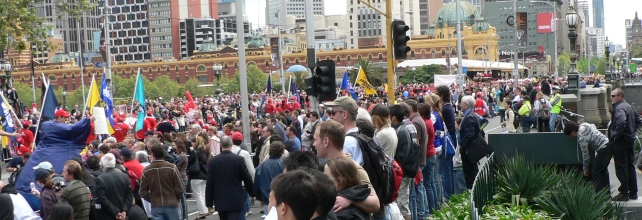
Some of people who lined the streets of Melbourne for the 2006 AFL Grand Final parade

== Teams ==
Sydney	West Coast

Sydney
B:	9 Nick Malceski	21 Leo Barry	25 Ted Richards
HB:	6 Craig Bolton	30 Lewis Roberts-Thomson	17 Tadhg Kennelly
C:	20 Luke Ablett	31 Brett Kirk (c)	32 Amon Buchanan
HF:	24 Jude Bolton	19 Michael O'Loughlin	5 Ryan O'Keefe
F:	4 Ben Mathews	1 Barry Hall	13 Adam Schneider
Foll:	16 Darren Jolly	37 Adam Goodes	3 Jarrad McVeigh
Int:	2 Nick Davis	26 Sean Dempster	15 Stephen Doyle
Int:	12 Nic Fosdike		
Coach:	Paul Roos		

West Coast
B:	37 Adam Selwood	23 Darren Glass	44 David Wirrpanda
HB:	38 Brett Jones	39 Adam Hunter	8 Beau Waters
C:	10 Michael Braun	9 Ben Cousins	32 Andrew Embley
HF:	17 Daniel Chick	29 Ashley Hansen	5 Tyson Stenglein
F:	7 Chad Fletcher	21 Quinten Lynch	18 Rowan Jones
Foll:	20 Dean Cox	3 Chris Judd (c)	4 Daniel Kerr
Int:	35 Steven Armstrong	6 Drew Banfield	26 Sam Butler
Int:	14 Mark Seaby		
Coach:	John Worsfold		

=== List ===
Sydney	2006 AFL Grand Final	West Coast
(12.12)	84 – 85	(12.13)

Position	Player	Poss.	Goals
Forward	Adam Schneider	14	1
Forward	Barry Hall	12	
Forward	Nic Fosdike	20	
Half-Forward	Ryan O'Keefe	15	1
Half-Forward	Michael O'Loughlin	10	3
Half-Forward	Jude Bolton	10	
Centre	Amon Buchanan	15	
Centre	Brett Kirk	27	
Centre	Luke Ablett	5	
Half-Back	Tadhg Kennelly	21	
Half-Back	Lewis Roberts-Thomson	8	1
Half-Back	Craig Bolton	10	
Back	Ted Richards	17	
Back	Leo Barry	11	
Back	Nick Malceski	10	1
Rover	Jarrad McVeigh	9	
Follower	Darren Jolly	5	
Follower	Adam Goodes	22	1
Interchange	Ben Mathews	10	1
Interchange	Nick Davis	11	3
Interchange	Sean Dempster	7	
Interchange	Stephen Doyle	6	
Coach:	Paul Roos		

Position	Player	Poss.	Goals
Forward	Steven Armstrong	8	1
Forward	Quinten Lynch	11	3
Forward	Mark Seaby	2	
Half-Forward	Daniel Chick	10	
Half-Forward	Ashley Hansen	11	2
Half-Forward	Tyson Stenglein	23	
Centre	Andrew Embley	26	2
Centre	Ben Cousins	18	2
Centre	Michael Braun	22	
Half-Back	Beau Waters	26	
Half-Back	Adam Hunter	22	1
Half-Back	Brett Jones	16	
Back	David Wirrpanda	13	
Back	Darren Glass	10	
Back	Adam Selwood	26	
Rover	Daniel Kerr	20	
Follower	Dean Cox	20	
Follower	Chris Judd	28	1
Interchange	Drew Banfield	9	
Interchange	Sam Butler	14	
Interchange	Chad Fletcher	25	
Interchange	Rowan Jones	13	
Coach:	John Worsfold		

== Aftermath ==
West Coast's premiership victory was the eighth time in ten years, and the sixth consecutive year dating back to 2001, that a non-Victorian club had won the premiership, prompting then-AFL CEO Andrew Demetriou order an investigation into the under-performance of the Victorian clubs in the competition; at that point, Essendon was the last Victorian club to win a flag, in 2000, and Collingwood was the last Victorian club to play in a grand final, in 2003. This trend since changed, and in the twenty subsequent seasons (2007–2026), only three non-Victorian clubs – Sydney (2012), West Coast (2018) and Brisbane (2024, 2025, 2026) – have won the premiership.

== See also ==
- 2006 AFL season
- 2006 AFL finals series
