= Steven Armstrong =

Australian rules footballer

Personal information
- Born: 12 January 1984 (age 42); Perth, Western Australia
- Original team: Perth
- Draft: 25th overall, 2001 National Draft
- Height: 180 cm (5 ft 11 in)
- Weight: 81 kg (179 lb)
- Positions: Small forward, midfielder

Playing career^{1}
Years	Club	Games (Goals)
2002–2005	Melbourne	43 (21)
2006–2008	West Coast	36 (27)
Total		79 (48)
- ^{1} Playing statistics correct to the end of 2008.

Career highlights
- AFL premiership player: 2006; Perth best and fairest 2006; Harold Ball Memorial Trophy 2002; AFL Rising Star nominee 2002; Larke Medal 2001

Steven Armstrong (born 12 January 1984) is a former Australian rules footballer in the Australian Football League and current coach of the Perth Football Club. He has played for the Melbourne Football Club and the 2006 West Coast Eagles premiership team.

He was injured in the 2002 Bali bombings, and he bears a scar on his leg from this incident.

== Football career ==
Drafted in the 2001 AFL draft at pick 25 in the second round, Armstrong made his debut for Melbourne in 2002. He was known for his tenacity around the ball and being a team player. However, after being omitted from the starting line-up several times (playing only 12 games between 2004–2005), he was delisted at the end of the 2005 season.

In 2006 he was thrown a lifeline by the West Coast Eagles by being added to their rookie list. He finally made his debut for the Eagles in round 13 against the Western Bulldogs where he was one of the Eagles' best players for the match. Despite only having 15 disposals for the match, his ferocity on and off the ball was recognised. With tough competition in the Eagles lineup, he was dropped the next week. He made a return in round 17 in the Eagles' 82 point win over minor premiers Adelaide, kicking three goals. Armstrong was selected for the first match of the 2006 finals after kicking four goals the week before. He played in the 2006 AFL Grand Final, and kicked the Eagles' penultimate goal in the final quarter to help his team win by one point.

In 2007, Armstrong had an indifferent season. He started off the season in fine fashion, impressing as a small forward, a position the club has struggled to fill since the departure of Phil Matera in 2005, including a three-goal performance in the round 3 Western Derby against Fremantle. However, one sub-par performance in the club's first loss of the season against Geelong in round 7, saw him lose his place in the team. He was brought back in as a replacement as early as round 9 against Hawthorn, however struggled to cement a regular spot in the team, only filling in for injuries and spent the rest of the season playing for Perth in the West Australian Football League (WAFL).

He played 14 games for the Eagles in the disappointing 2008 season. He was delisted by the club at the end of the season.

In 2009, Armstrong was signed to play full-time for Perth Demons in the WAFL.

In late 2011, after a career spanning 10 seasons, Armstrong announced that he was retiring from football to concentrate on his coaching career. He previously held the position of Claremont League Assistant.

== Statistics ==
Legend
G	Goals	K	Kicks	D	Disposals	T	Tackles
B	Behinds	H	Handballs	M	Marks

Season	Team	No.	Games	Totals							Averages (per game)						
Season	Team	No.	Games	G	B	K	H	D	M	T	G	B	K	H	D	M	T
2002	Melbourne	2	13	7	4	74	59	133	37	23	0.5	0.3	5.7	4.5	10.2	2.8	1.8
2003	Melbourne	2	18	8	7	120	111	231	57	43	0.4	0.4	6.7	6.2	12.8	3.2	2.4
2004	Melbourne	2	6	4	2	39	20	59	10	14	0.7	0.3	6.5	3.3	9.8	1.7	2.3
2005	Melbourne	2	6	2	0	26	13	39	10	19	0.3	0.0	4.3	2.2	6.5	1.7	3.2
2006	West Coast	35	10	10	9	73	62	135	39	15	1.0	0.9	7.3	6.2	13.5	3.9	1.5
2007	West Coast	35	12	8	10	96	71	167	38	28	0.7	0.8	8.0	5.9	13.9	3.2	2.3
2008	West Coast	35	14	9	11	107	109	216	55	43	0.6	0.8	7.6	7.8	15.4	3.9	3.1
Career			79	48	43	535	445	980	246	185	0.6	0.5	6.8	5.6	12.4	3.1	2.3
