= John Worsfold =

Australian rules footballer, born 1968

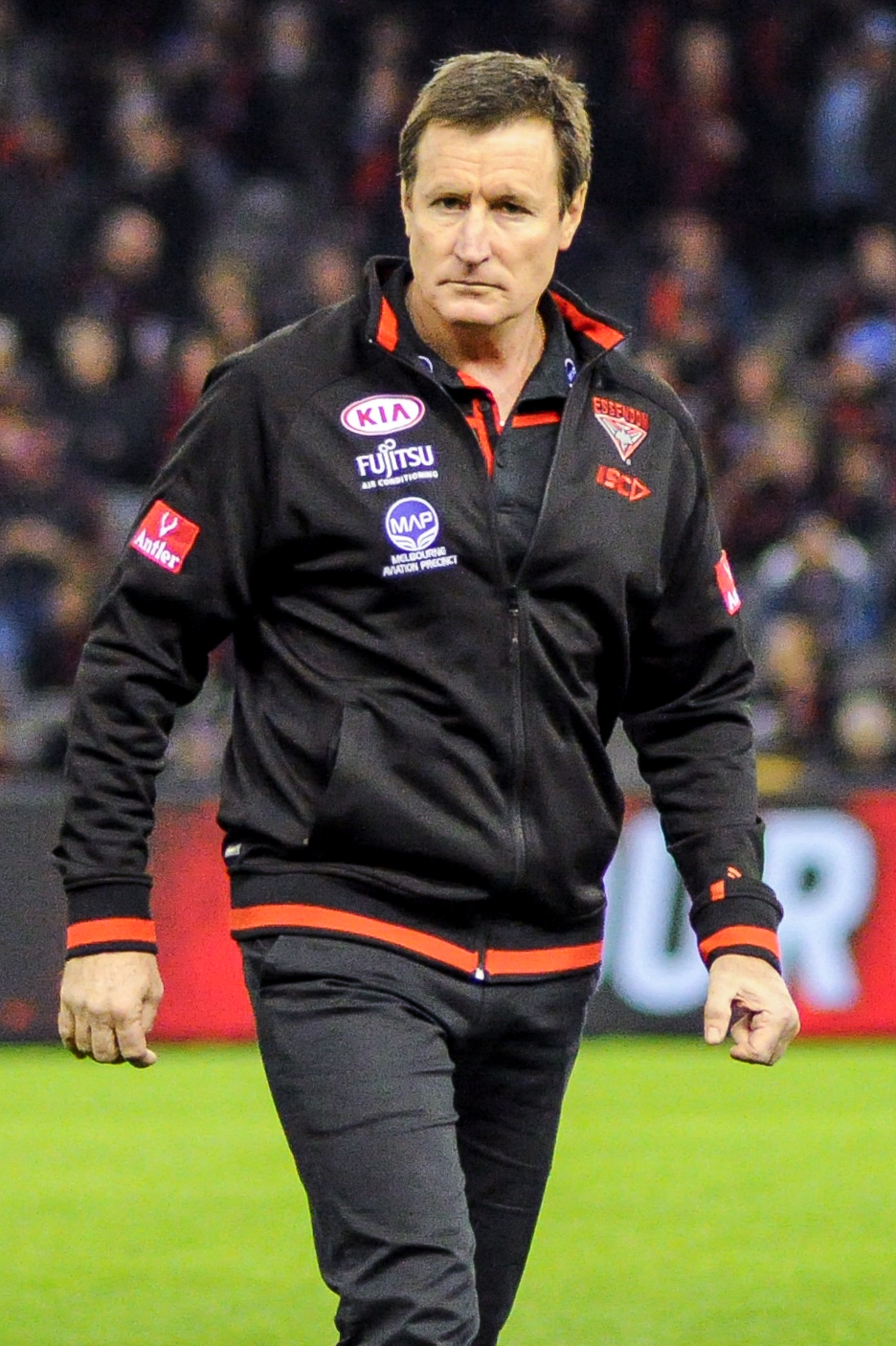
- Worsfold in June 2017

Personal information
- Full name: John Richard Worsfold
- Nickname: Woosha
- Born: 25 September 1968 (age 58); Subiaco, Western Australia
- Original team: South Fremantle
- Height: 180 cm (5 ft 11 in)
- Weight: 86 kg (190 lb)

Playing career^{1}
Years	Club	Games (Goals)
1986–1987	South Fremantle	24 (4)
1987–1998	West Coast	209 (37)
Total		233 (41)

Representative team honours
Years	Team	Games (Goals)
1988–1993	Western Australia	5 (0)

Coaching career^{3}
Years	Club	Games (W–L–D)
2002–2013	West Coast	281 (149–130–2)
2016–2020	Essendon	107 (45–61–1)
Total		388 (194–191–3)
- ^{1} Playing statistics correct to the end of 1998.^{3} Coaching statistics correct as of 2020.

Career highlights
- Playing: 2× AFL premiership: 1992, 1994; West Coast captain: 1991–1998; Australian Football Hall of Fame inductee (inducted 2026); West Coast Club Champion: 1988; South Fremantle best first year player: 1986; WAFL Rookie of the Year: 1986; West Coast best clubman: 1993, 1998; Western Australia Captain: 1992–1993; West Australian Football Hall of Fame inductee (inducted 2004); Coaching: AFL premiership: 2006; 2× AFLCA Coach of the Year: 2006, 2011

John Richard Worsfold (born 25 September 1968) is a former Australian rules football coach and player. He had a long association with the West Coast Eagles as player (1987–1998) and coach (2002–2013), captaining the club to premierships in 1992 and 1994 and coaching the club to a premiership in 2006. He was also the senior coach of the Essendon Football Club in the Australian Football League (AFL) between October 2015 and September 2020. Worsfold is a member of the Australian Football Hall of Fame.

Worsfold began his career with the South Fremantle Football Club in the West Australian Football League (WAFL), before being named an inaugural squad member of West Coast on their formation in 1986. After winning the club's best and fairest award in 1988, he was appointed the captain of the club in 1991, a position he would hold until his retirement in 1998. During his period at the club, Worsfold played in 209 games, which including the 1992 and 1994 premiership sides. During this time, he also appeared in five State of Origin matches for Western Australia, including captaining his state twice.

In 2000, two years after his retirement from playing, Worsfold joined Carlton as an assistant coach, remaining in this position until the end of the 2001 season, when he was appointed senior coach of West Coast in place of Ken Judge. Worsfold coached the club in eight finals series, including the 2006 premiership. In 2010, he coached West Coast to its first wooden spoon, but the following season the team finished fourth, with Worsfold receiving the AFLCA Coach of the Year Award for the second time. He coached West Coast in a club record 274 games before resigning at the end of the 2013 season. He was named an inaugural inductee into the West Australian Football Hall of Fame in 2004 and the John Worsfold Medal is named in his honour.

After a two-year absence from coaching, Worsfold was appointed senior coach of Essendon on 5 October 2015. He handed over to his assistant Ben Rutten at the end of the 2020 season as part of a planned transition.

== Early life ==
Born in Subiaco, and growing up in the southern suburbs of Perth, Western Australia, Worsfold attended Winterfold Primary School and later South Fremantle High School, Western Australia graduating in 1985.

== Playing career ==
Worsfold fell into the South Fremantle Football Club's recruitment zone, he played in the club's underage teams, and also played in the Western Australia under-18 team that won the state's first Teal Cup in 1985. Worsfold made his senior WAFL debut for South Fremantle in 1986, and played a total of 19 games in his debut season, leading him to be awarded the Rookie of the Year award by the Daily News. At South Fremantle, he also won "Player of the Future" and "Best First Year Player" awards in 1985 and 1986, respectively.

=== West Coast Eagles ===
In October 1986, Worsfold was named as a member of the West Coast Eagles' inaugural 32-man squad. He made his senior debut for the club in round four of the 1987 season, against Carlton at Princes Park. Worsfold played a total of 11 games in the club's inaugural season and also played five games in the WAFL for South Fremantle. The following season, he cemented his role in the side playing every game except for two games missed due to suspension in rounds nine and ten. At the end of the season, Worsfold was awarded the Club Champion Award as West Coast's best and fairest, winning by ten votes from runner-up Guy McKenna. He was also awarded a total of five votes in the Brownlow Medal for the best player in the competition, including two votes for 30-disposal and 28-disposal games against Essendon and Melbourne. Worsfold played in his first finals match at the conclusion of the 1988 season, a two-point loss to Melbourne at Waverley Park. Worsfold led West Coast in disposals, kicks, and tackles in 1988.

Worsfold had similar seasons in 1989 and 1990. Having been appointed vice-captain prior to the start of the 1989 season, he took on greater leadership roles under the influence of new coach Michael Malthouse. After the club's loss in the qualifying final to Collingwood, captain Steve Malaxos was dropped from the side for the preliminary final, with Worsfold appointed captain in his place. Moving from a midfield role to a half-back flank in 1991, Worsfold was officially made club captain and played a total of 21 games, including the loss in the 1991 Grand Final to Hawthorn. Worsfold captained the club to premierships in 1992 and 1994, and retired at the end of the 1998 season, having played 209 games for the club.

==== Playing style ====
Tribunal record
Year	Charge	Penalty
1988	Striking	Suspended two matches
1990	Striking	Suspended two matches
1993	Abusive language	Fined A$1,500
1995	Throat-grabbing	No penalty

Worsfold began his career as a midfielder but moved to a position on the half-back flank later in his career, where he played most of his football. Considered one of the club's toughest and most courageous players, he was suspended twice in his career, both times for striking.

Worsfold was named on a half-back flank in West Coast's "Team of the Decade" in 1996, and in the same position in teams named for the 20-year and 25-year anniversaries of the club's first season. He was an inaugural inductee into the West Australian Football Hall of Fame in 2004, and an inaugural inductee into the West Coast Eagles Hall of Fame in 2011. The Australian Football Hall of Fame's selection process has been criticised for precluding Worsfold's induction, as the Hall of Fame prohibits selectors from considering a person based on a combination of their playing and coaching careers. A function room at Subiaco Oval, the John Worsfold Room was also named after Worsfold.

== Post-playing career and Channel 7 commentator ==
For the first year after the end of his playing career, Worsfold worked as a commentator with Channel 7.

== Coaching career ==
It is possible, as Worsfold admits, that he may not want to coach at the highest level. He may not even have the right blend of ambition and insanity for the job, but his profile, successful history and hard-man reputation makes him such an obvious candidate for a job that other clubs will take a close look at him. Worsfold's decision to take on an assistant coaching job at Carlton greatly enhances his marketability as a senior coach. By the season's end, he will have more experience than Tim Watson had, but with a similar brand name. He will have many of the perceived qualifications of a senior coach: premierships as a player, a tough guy with peer respect, brains and, crucially, he will have played under and assisted two big-name coaches in Mick Malthouse and David Parkin. Coaching is like kung fu: it helps to have earned your black belt under a master.

— The Age, 20 November 1999

=== Carlton Football Club assistant coach (2000–2001) ===
At the end of 1999, Worsfold confirmed that he was interested in coaching and that he was willing to move away from Perth in order to do so. He was subsequently offered a full-time assistant coaching position at both West Coast and Fremantle, and was at one stage considered a possible candidate to coach Geelong following Gary Ayres' decision to leave the club to coach Adelaide. Worsfold also interviewed for the vacant senior coaching position at Hawthorn, along with Chris Connolly, Mark Harvey, and Peter Schwab, but was turned down in favour of Schwab. Worsfold finally signed a three-year contract to serve as an assistant coach at Carlton. He had also been in contention for the position of senior coach at Richmond but declined to be interviewed after accepting the role at Carlton. Worsfold's appointment was controversial; Carlton's president John Elliott officially confirmed Worsfold had been engaged as assistant coach on The Footy Show, two days before the club was due to play in a preliminary final. Carlton's senior coach David Parkin suggested the appointment had come "out of the blue", and it was later reported that he had threatened to quit as a result of the club's lack of consultation.

His coaching career started in 2000 at Carlton Football Club as an assistant coach under senior coach David Parkin and then under senior coach Wayne Brittain in 2001.

In the 2000 season, As part of a restructure of Carlton's coaching panel, Parkin moved to more of an overseeing role, with his senior assistant coach, Wayne Brittain, given a greater role. Under this structure, Worsfold was given responsibility for coaching the defence, including formulating the club's kick-in strategy. At the end of the 2000 season, with Carlton having lost to Essendon in a preliminary final, Parkin retired as senior coach, and was replaced by Brittain. Having maintained his role as a defensive coach under Brittain, Worsfold was again considered a strong candidate for several other clubs' vacant senior coaching positions during (and at the conclusion of) the 2001 season. After Damian Drum's sacking as senior coach of Fremantle midway through the season, Worsfold was approached to interview for the position, but refused, stating a desire to wait until the end of the season. He also stated in his interest in the position at St Kilda, which was eventually filled by Grant Thomas, who had been serving as caretaker senior coach. After Carlton's season ended with a semi-final loss to Richmond, Worsfold interviewed with both Fremantle and his old playing club, West Coast, who had sacked Ken Judge. He was considered likely to take up the position at Fremantle, with Neil Craig considered a favourite to coach West Coast, but eventually leveraged his status at Fremantle into securing the West Coast position.

=== West Coast Eagles senior coach (2002–2013) ===
Worsfold went to apply for the senior coaching roles at both West Coast and Fremantle at the end of the 2001 season. Eventually, he was appointed to the senior coaching role at the Eagles, when he replaced Ken Judge, who was sacked as West Coast Eagles senior coach at the end of the 2001 season. Worsfold was appointed coach to the club he had formerly played for, where he achieved some level of immediate success, taking the club back to the finals in his first season. After a string of early finals exits in 2002, 2003 and 2004, Worsfold finally took the club to the 2005 AFL Grand Final, where the Eagles were narrowly defeated by the Sydney Swans by a margin of four points with the final score Sydney Swans 8.10 (58) to West Coast Eagles 7.12 (54).

In the 2006 season, the club finished on top of the ladder after the home and away series, and followed it up with a win in the 2006 AFL Grand Final, when West Coast Eagles defeated the Sydney Swans, this time the margin being a solitary point with the final score West Coast Eagles 12.13 (85) to Sydney Swans 12.12 (84). In doing so, Worsfold became only the fourth person in the history of the AFL/VFL to both captain and later coach the same club to an AFL premiership and the first at the West Coast Eagles. In the 2007 season, West Coast finished third on the ladder. They lost to Port Adelaide in the qualifying final then they got eliminated by Collingwood in the semi-final. The 2008 season was not as successful for Worsfold and the West Coast Eagles. With the loss of players Chris Judd and Ben Cousins, West Coast went from third to fifteenth, finishing with four wins and eighteen losses and the lowest percentage in the club's history. In the 2009 season, Worsfold and the West Coast Eagles Football Club made an improvement, finishing eleventh on the ladder with eight wins and fourteen losses.

The 2010 season brought in another low point of Worsfold's coaching career with the Eagles completing a spectacular fall from grace and receiving the wooden spoon, winning just four games; two against Essendon and one each against Hawthorn and Melbourne. Injuries and poor form plagued the Eagles' 2010 season, though their overall record was not as bad as in 2008. Worsfold became the fourth man (of five) after Reg Hickey, Charlie Sutton, Tony Jewell and later Adam Simpson to coach the same club to both a premiership and a wooden spoon.

However in the 2011 season, the Eagles were back in the finals, finishing 4th at the end of the home and away season and losing a preliminary final against eventual premiers Geelong. After the club's top-four finish, Worsfold signed a two-year extension to his contract in October 2011. In the 2012 season, West Coast under Worsfold made the finals again, but were eliminated by Collingwood in the semi-final. At the conclusion of round ten of the 2012 season, Worsfold passed Mick Malthouse's record for the most games coached at West Coast.

On 5 September 2013, after a disappointing 2013 season for the Eagles, who finished in 13th place on the AFL ladder, Worsfold stepped down as the senior coach of the West Coast Eagles. Worsfold was replaced by Adam Simpson as West Coast Eagles senior coach.

In his 11 years with the club, Worsfold coached 281 games for the Eagles, achieving 149 wins, 2 draws and 130 losses, for a winning percentage of 53.38%.

After the death of a close friend, the Adelaide coach Phil Walsh in July 2015, Worsford took an assistant coaching role for the Adelaide Crows.

=== Essendon Football Club senior coach (2016–2020) ===
On 5 October 2015, Worsfold was appointed as the senior coach of the Essendon Football Club. He signed a three-year contract, replacing caretaker senior coach Matthew Egan, who replaced James Hird after Hird resigned during the 2015 season. His first season in the 2016 season at the club proved to be a difficult one, with twelve senior players, including then-captain Jobe Watson and vice-captain Dyson Heppell, receiving suspensions for the 2016 season, as a consequence of Essendon's 2013 doping scandal. Due to this, the club finished on the bottom of the ladder for the first time since 1933, and Worsfold claimed his second wooden spoon as a coach. However, he would take the Bombers back to the finals in the 2017 season, where they suffered a 65-point elimination final defeat at the hands of the Sydney Swans at the Sydney Cricket Ground. In the 2018 season Worsfold took Essendon to finish eleventh on the ladder, missing out of the finals with ten wins and twelve losses. In the 2019 season, Worsfold took Essendon back into the finals again, where they were eliminated by his old side the West Coast Eagles in the elimination final. On 17 September 2019, it was announced that Essendon assistant coach Ben Rutten would succeed Worsfold as the senior coach at the conclusion of the 2020 season. In the 2020 season, Essendon finished thirteenth on the ladder with six wins and ten losses, therefore missing out of the finals. As planned, Rutten took over from Worsfold as senior coach of Essendon at the conclusion of the 2020 season.

=== Coaching style ===
In an era where most coaches had implemented "the flood" defence by having their players zone back, Worsfold maintained a man-on-man style of game for his West Coast team during the mid-2000s. While this led West Coast to much success in the home and away season, finishing second and first after the home and away rounds in 2005 and 2006 respectively, the strategy, or rather the inflexibility from this strategy also led to criticism at times. Firstly, teams such as the Western Bulldogs and Fremantle were perceived to exploit West Coast's macro-positioning. However, the most notable example of this criticism came after the qualifying final against Sydney in 2006. However, West Coast did proceed to defeat Sydney in the Grand Final three weeks later.

The 2009 season had seen Worsfold and his coaching department implement the use of both zone defence and man-on-man strategy depending on the situation.

== Post-coaching career ==
After leaving Essendon, Worsfold spent four years as General Manager of People and Culture at the ASX-listed Emeco Group.

In October 2024, Worsfold was appointed Head of Football at the West Coast Eagles.

In 2026, Worsfold was inducted into the Australian Football Hall of Fame.

== Statistics ==
=== Playing statistics ===
Legend
G	Goals	K	Kicks	D	Disposals	T	Tackles
B	Behinds	H	Handballs	M	Marks

Season	Team	No.	Games	Totals							Averages (per game)						
Season	Team	No.	Games	G	B	K	H	D	M	T	G	B	K	H	D	M	T
1987	West Coast	24	11	1	0	87	42	129	29	20	0.1	0.0	7.9	3.8	11.7	2.6	1.8
1988	West Coast	24	21	4	7	331	135	466	120	40	0.2	0.3	15.8	6.4	22.2	5.7	1.9
1989	West Coast	24	20	6	5	258	127	385	101	44	0.3	0.3	12.9	6.4	19.3	5.1	2.2
1990	West Coast	24	23	1	2	218	152	370	76	45	0.0	0.1	9.5	6.6	16.1	3.3	2.0
1991	West Coast	24	21	1	0	186	130	316	56	31	0.0	0.0	8.9	6.2	15.0	2.7	1.5
1992†	West Coast	24	22	1	2	177	117	294	64	47	0.0	0.1	8.0	5.3	13.4	2.9	2.1
1993	West Coast	24	19	6	2	197	119	316	56	32	0.3	0.1	10.4	6.3	16.6	2.9	1.7
1994†	West Coast	24	19	2	3	127	116	243	41	41	0.1	0.2	6.7	6.1	12.8	2.2	2.2
1995	West Coast	24	20	13	2	118	105	223	37	27	0.7	0.1	5.9	5.3	11.2	1.9	1.4
1996	West Coast	24	2	0	0	9	11	20	6	0	0.0	0.0	4.5	5.5	10.0	3.0	0.0
1997	West Coast	24	14	0	0	80	68	148	35	16	0.0	0.0	5.7	4.9	10.6	2.5	1.2
1998	West Coast	24	17	2	3	96	68	164	46	21	0.1	0.2	5.6	4.0	9.6	2.7	1.2
Career			209	37	26	1884	1190	3074	667	364	0.2	0.1	9.0	5.7	14.7	3.2	1.7

=== Coaching statistics ===
Statistics are correct to the end of the 2020 season.

Team	Year	Home and Away Season					Finals			
Team	Year	Won	Lost	Drew	Win %	Position	Won	Lost	Win %	Result
WCE	2002	11	11	0	.500	8th out of 16	0	0	.000	Lost to Essendon in Elimination Final
WCE	2003	12	8	2	.545	7th out of 16	0	0	.000	Lost to Adelaide in Elimination Final
WCE	2004	13	9	0	.591	7th out of 16	0	0	.000	Lost to Sydney in Elimination Final
WCE	2005	17	5	0	.773	2nd out of 16	2	1	.667	Lost to Sydney in Grand Final
WCE	2006	17	5	0	.773	1st out of 16	3	1	.750	Defeated Sydney in Grand Final
WCE	2007	15	7	0	.681	3rd out of 16	0	2	.000	Lost to Collingwood in Semi Final
WCE	2008	4	18	0	.181	15th out of 16	-	-	-	-
WCE	2009	8	14	0	.364	11th out of 16	-	-	-	-
WCE	2010	4	18	0	.181	16th out of 16	-	-	-	-
WCE	2011	17	5	0	.773	4th out of 16	1	2	.332	Lost to Geelong in Preliminary Final
WCE	2012	15	7	0	.681	5th out of 16	1	1	.500	Lost to Collingwood in Semi Final
WCE	2013	9	13	0	.409	13th out of 16	-	-	-	-
WCE Total		142	120	2	.538		7	7	.500	Premierships: 2006
ESS	2016	3	19	0	.136	18th out of 18	-	-	-	-
ESS	2017	12	10	0	.545	7th out of 18	0	1	.000	Lost to Sydney in Elimination Final
ESS	2018	12	10	0	.545	11th out of 18	-	-	-	-
ESS	2019	12	10	0	.545	8th out of 18	0	1	.000	Lost to West Coast in Elimination Final
ESS	2018	6	10	1	.382	13th out of 18	-	-	-	-
ESS Total		45	59	1	.433		0	2	.000	
Career Total		187	179	3	.511		7	9	.438	Premierships: 2006

== Honours and achievements ==
Brownlow Medal votes
Season	Votes
1987	0
1988	5
1989	0
1990	0
1991	0
1992	1
1993	4
1994	0
1995	0
1996	0
1997	1
1998	0
Total	11

=== Playing honours ===
Team

- AFL premiership: 1992 (c), 1994 (c)
- McClelland Trophy: 1991 (c), 1994 (c)

Individual

  - Australian Football Hall of Fame (inducted 2026)
- West Coast Club Champion Award (later named the John Worsfold Medal): 1988
- West Coast best clubman: 1993, 1998
- Western Australia State of Origin captain: 1992–1993
- WAFL Rookie of the Year: 1986
- South Fremantle best first year player: 1986
- Western Australia under-18 representative: 1985
- West Coast captain: 1991–1998
- West Australian Football Hall of Fame inductee: 2004

=== Coaching honours ===
Team

- AFL premiership: 2006
- McClelland Trophy: 2006

Individual

- Jock McHale Medal: 2006
- AFLCA Coach of the Year Award: 2006, 2011

== Personal life ==
Worsfold married his wife, Georgina, in 1994, with whom he has three children: Sophie, Charlie, and Grace. Outside of football, he completed a Bachelor of Pharmacy at the Curtin University of Technology in 1989, and later worked as a pharmacist for an amount of time. In 2009, Worsfold completed a course at INSEAD, a business administration school in Fontainebleau, France. and occasionally works as a motivational speaker. Worsfold's younger brother, Peter Worsfold, played 31 games for the Brisbane Bears, and later captained South Fremantle.
