= Stephen Doyle (footballer) =

Australian rules footballer, born 1981

Personal information
- Born: 13 July 1981 (age 45)
- Original team: South Adelaide (SANFL)
- Debut: Round 20, 22 July 2000, Sydney Swans vs. Kangaroos, at SCG
- Height: 203 cm (6 ft 8 in)
- Weight: 105 kg (231 lb)

Playing career^{1}
Years	Club	Games (Goals)
2000–2007	Sydney Swans	47 (19)
- ^{1} Playing statistics correct to the end of 2007.

Stephen Doyle (born 13 July 1981) is a South Australian Australian rules football player with the Sydney Swans of the Australian Football League (AFL).

Doyle was selected by the Swans under the father–son rule in the 1999 National Draft, as his father Robert had played 77 games for South Melbourne. The tall ruckman made his debut in 2000, but recurring ankle and knee injuries meant that he did not manage to play more than three games in a row in his first four seasons. He had a relatively injury-free season in 2004, but did not stand out greatly. A knee injury in the first round in 2005 ruled him out of the rest of the Swans' premiership-winning season.

In 2006, following the retirement of premier ruckman Jason Ball, Doyle arrived at the end of the season in working order. Partnering Darren Jolly in the Grand Final, Doyle was the Swans better ruckman in their narrow loss to the West Coast Eagles.

For the 2007 season, the Sydney Swans recruited experienced ruckman Peter Everitt from Hawthorn to partner Darren Jolly, leaving Doyle to play in the reserves.

Doyle retired on 31 October 2007, after playing 47 games.
