= 2006 AFL season =

110th season of the Australian Football League (AFL)

2006 AFL premiership season
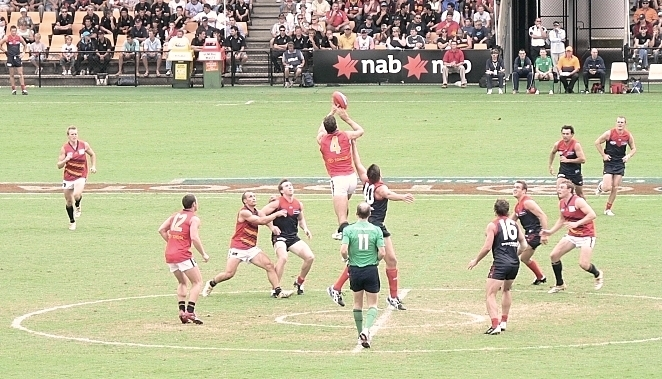
- Melbourne vs. Adelaide in round 3

Overview
- Teams: 16
- Premiers: West Coast; 3rd premiership
- Minor premiers: West Coast; 3rd minor premiership
- NAB Cup: Geelong; 1st pre-season cup win
- Brownlow Medallist: Adam Goodes (Sydney)
- Coleman Medallist: Brendan Fevola (Carlton)

Attendance
- Matches played: 185
- Total attendance: 6,736,234 (36,412 per match)
- Highest (finals): 97,431 (Grand Final, Sydney vs. West Coast)

The 2006 AFL season was the 110th season of the Australian Football League (AFL), the highest level senior Australian rules football competition in Australia. The season featured sixteen clubs, ran from 30 March until 30 September, and comprised a 22-game home-and-away season followed by a finals series featuring the top eight clubs.

The premiership was won by the West Coast Eagles for the third time, after it defeated Sydney by one point in the 2006 AFL Grand Final.

== Pre-season competition ==
Week One
Brisbane Lions	1	8	13	70
Essendon	1	8	12	69
Western Bulldogs	1	7	12	63
Melbourne	0	9	15	69
Hawthorn	1	11	10	85
Richmond	0	11	9	75
Adelaide	2	16	13	127
Port Adelaide	0	8	7	55
Kangaroos	1	8	11	68
Sydney	0	5	7	37
Carlton	1	8	13	70
Geelong	0	15	8	98
Collingwood	2	8	8	74
St Kilda	1	9	10	73
West Coast	1	7	14	65
Fremantle	1	18	10	127

Week Two
Brisbane Lions	0	12	9	81
Melbourne	0	13	12	90
Hawthorn	1	7	7	58
Adelaide	2	7	11	71
Kangaroos	1	8	3	60
Geelong	1	10	17	86
Collingwood	2	10	6	84
Fremantle	0	15	10	100

Semifinals
Melbourne	1	5	5	44
Adelaide	1	16	21	129
Geelong	3	10	14	101
Fremantle	1	10	12	81

Final
Adelaide	1	10	15	84
Geelong	3	10	5	92

Geelong 3.10.5 (92) defeated Adelaide 1.10.15 (84) in the 2006 NAB Cup Final. The game was held at AAMI Stadium, with an attendance of 30,707.

== Home-and-away season ==
=== Round 1 ===
	Round 1
Thursday, 30 March (6:40 pm)	West Coast 11.18 (84)	def.	St Kilda 9.12 (66)	Subiaco Oval (crowd: 40,036)
Friday, 31 March (7:40 pm)	Western Bulldogs 25.17 (167)	def.	Richmond 7.10 (52)	Telstra Dome (crowd: 43,532)
Saturday, 1 April (2:10 pm)	Geelong 17.13 (115)	def.	Brisbane Lions 5.8 (38)	Skilled Stadium (crowd: 23,029)
Saturday, 1 April (7:10 pm)	Essendon 17.6 (108)	def.	Sydney 12.9 (81)	Telstra Dome (crowd: 45,355)
Saturday, 1 April (7:10 pm)	Port Adelaide 13.9 (87)	def. by	Kangaroos 19.14 (128)	AAMI Stadium (crowd: 27,680)
Sunday, 2 April (1:10 pm)	Hawthorn 17.7 (109)	def.	Fremantle 13.9 (87)	Aurora Stadium (crowd: 13,682)
Sunday, 2 April (5:10 pm)	Melbourne 10.12 (72)	def. by	Carlton 13.15 (93)	Telstra Dome (crowd: 31,139)
Monday, 3 April (7:10 pm)	Collingwood 12.5 (77)	def. by	Adelaide 17.9 (111)	Telstra Dome (crowd: 35,434)

=== Round 2 ===
	Round 2
Friday, 7 April (7:40 pm)	Richmond 11.11 (77)	def. by	St Kilda 13.10 (88)	Telstra Dome (crowd: 40,740)
Saturday, 8 April (2:10 pm)	Geelong 22.6 (138)	def.	Kangaroos 10.9 (69)	Skilled Stadium (crowd: 22,839)
Saturday, 8 April (2:10 pm)	Western Bulldogs 20.17 (137)	def.	Melbourne 12.18 (90)	Telstra Dome (crowd: 28,478)
Saturday, 8 April (7:10 pm)	Brisbane Lions 17.13 (115)	def.	Essendon 15.7 (97)	The Gabba (crowd: 34,357)
Saturday, 8 April (5:40 pm)	Fremantle 15.11 (101)	def.	Carlton 13.8 (86)	Subiaco Oval (crowd: 34,553)
Sunday, 9 April (1:10 pm)	Sydney 11.14 (80)	def. by	Port Adelaide 15.16 (106)	SCG (crowd: 33,551)
Sunday, 9 April (2:10 pm)	Hawthorn 12.12 (84)	def. by	Collingwood 18.11 (119)	Telstra Dome (crowd: 43,296)
Sunday, 9 April (2:40 pm)	Adelaide 13.10 (88)	def. by	West Coast 13.12 (90)	AAMI Stadium (crowd: 43,206)

=== Round 3 ===
	Round 3 (Easter Round)
Thursday, 13 April (7:40 pm)	St Kilda 19.10 (124)	def.	Brisbane Lions 12.15 (87)	Telstra Dome (crowd: 35,760)
Saturday, 15 April (2:10 pm)	Geelong 6.13 (49)	def. by	Hawthorn 15.11 (101)	Skilled Stadium (crowd: 24,026)
Saturday, 15 April (7:10 pm)	Carlton 11.8 (74)	def. by	Sydney 12.9 (81)	Telstra Dome (crowd: 36,882)
Saturday, 15 April (7:40 pm)	West Coast 20.16 (136)	def.	Richmond 14.6 (90)	Subiaco Oval (crowd: 39,436)
Sunday, 16 April (1:10 pm)	Melbourne 14.13 (97)	def. by	Adelaide 15.12 (102)	Carrara Stadium (crowd: 8,258)
Sunday, 16 April (2:10 pm)	Essendon 13.15 (93)	def. by	Western Bulldogs 15.14 (104)	Telstra Dome (crowd: 43,947)
Sunday, 16 April (4:10 pm)	Port Adelaide 11.13 (79)	def. by	Fremantle 15.20 (110)	AAMI Stadium (crowd: 25,042)
Monday, 17 April (2:10 pm)	Kangaroos 11.10 (76)	def. by	Collingwood 23.15 (153)	Telstra Dome (crowd: 48,721)

=== Round 4 ===
	Round 4 (ANZAC Day Round)
Friday, 21 April (7:40 pm)	Carlton 9.14 (68)	def. by	Hawthorn 15.10 (100)	Telstra Dome (crowd: 45,102)
Saturday, 22 April (2:10 pm)	Western Bulldogs 14.14 (98)	def.	Geelong 14.13 (97)	Telstra Dome (crowd: 45,922)
Saturday, 22 April (7:10 pm)	Brisbane Lions 11.16 (82)	def. by	Richmond 14.12 (96)	The Gabba (crowd: 30,266)
Saturday, 22 April (5:40 pm)	Fremantle 9.5 (59)	def. by	Adelaide 9.16 (70)	Subiaco Oval (crowd: 35,090)
Sunday, 23 April (1:10 pm)	Kangaroos 10.11 (71)	def. by	West Coast 14.11 (95)	Manuka Oval (crowd: 9,541)
Sunday, 23 April (1:10 pm)	Sydney 13.14 (92)	def. by	Melbourne 15.7 (97)	SCG (crowd: 29,167)
Monday, 24 April (7:10 pm)	Port Adelaide 19.8 (122)	def.	St Kilda 18.10 (118)	AAMI Stadium (crowd: 32,188)
Tuesday, 25 April (2:40 pm)	Collingwood 15.16 (106)	def.	Essendon 12.17 (89)	MCG (crowd: 91,234)

=== Round 5 ===
	Round 5
Friday, 28 April (7:40 pm)	Richmond 12.20 (92)	def.	Carlton 11.18 (84)	MCG (crowd: 54,815)
Saturday, 29 April (2:10 pm)	Melbourne 13.12 (90)	def.	Kangaroos 12.14 (86)	MCG (crowd: 30,392)
Saturday, 29 April (2:40 pm)	Adelaide 20.12 (132)	def.	Western Bulldogs 7.13 (55)	AAMI Stadium (crowd: 41,057)
Saturday, 29 April (7:10 pm)	Sydney 15.17 (107)	def.	Geelong 13.7 (85)	Telstra Stadium (crowd: 37,032)
Saturday, 29 April (5:40 pm)	West Coast 18.14 (122)	def.	Brisbane Lions 9.9 (63)	Subiaco Oval (crowd: 40,519)
Sunday, 30 April (1:10 pm)	St Kilda 13.15 (93)	def. by	Fremantle 14.10 (94)	Aurora Stadium (crowd: 15,282)
Sunday, 30 April (2:10 pm)	Collingwood 18.12 (120)	def.	Port Adelaide 11.13 (79)	Telstra Dome (crowd: 32,276)
Sunday, 30 April (2:10 pm)	Hawthorn 12.12 (84)	def.	Essendon 12.11 (83)	MCG (crowd: 40,179)
The AFL siren controversy occurred in this round between St Kilda and Fremantle. Play had continued on for 10 seconds after the final siren as St Kilda had kicked a behind and scores were level due to umpires unable to hear the siren. Three days later, the AFL Commission had determined that the match officially ended on the final siren and therefore reversed the result. Fremantle got rewarded with the win and 4 points on the ladder as St Kilda had their 2 points stripped from the ladder.

=== Round 6 ===
	Round 6 (Rivalry Round)
Friday, 5 May (7:40 pm)	Melbourne 13.9 (87)	def.	Geelong 11.15 (81)	MCG (crowd: 36,041)
Saturday, 6 May (2:10 pm)	St Kilda 14.8 (92)	def.	Western Bulldogs 12.6 (78)	Telstra Dome (crowd: 42,760)
Saturday, 6 May (2:10 pm)	Fremantle 12.16 (88)	def.	West Coast 12.11 (83)	Subiaco Oval (crowd: 42,213)
Saturday, 6 May (7:10 pm)	Adelaide 15.13 (103)	def.	Port Adelaide 8.5 (53)	AAMI Stadium (crowd: 42,723)
Saturday, 6 May (7:45 pm)	Essendon 13.17 (95)	def. by	Richmond 13.19 (97)	MCG (crowd: 58,439)
Sunday, 7 May (1:10 pm)	Brisbane Lions 10.10 (70)	def. by	Sydney 15.12 (102)	The Gabba (crowd: 29,872)
Sunday, 7 May (2:10 pm)	Carlton 9.12 (66)	def. by	Collingwood 21.12 (138)	MCG (crowd: 59,695)
Sunday, 7 May (2:10 pm)	Kangaroos 15.12 (102)	def.	Hawthorn 11.14 (80)	Telstra Dome (crowd: 28,047)

=== Round 7 ===
	Round 7
Friday, 12 May (7:40 pm)	St Kilda 9.10 (64)	def. by	Geelong 12.10 (82)	Telstra Dome (crowd: 48,313)
Saturday, 13 May (2:10 pm)	Melbourne 17.15 (117)	def.	Fremantle 8.10 (58)	MCG (crowd: 23,368)
Saturday, 13 May (2:10 pm)	Richmond 9.8 (62)	def. by	Sydney 28.12 (180)	Telstra Dome (crowd: 36,477)
Saturday, 13 May (7:10 pm)	Hawthorn 9.12 (66)	def. by	Brisbane Lions 16.10 (106)	Carrara Stadium (crowd: 12,315)
Saturday, 13 May (5:40 pm)	West Coast 16.16 (112)	def.	Collingwood 15.8 (98)	Subiaco Oval (crowd: 42,033)
Sunday, 14 May (12:40 pm)	Port Adelaide 13.12 (90)	def. by	Western Bulldogs 25.16 (166)	AAMI Stadium (crowd: 20,233)
Sunday, 14 May (2:10 pm)	Carlton 17.9 (111)	def.	Essendon 11.12 (78)	MCG (crowd: 32,976)
Sunday, 14 May (2:10 pm)	Kangaroos 9.6 (60)	def. by	Adelaide 18.8 (116)	Telstra Dome (crowd: 16,064)

=== Round 8 ===
	Round 8
Friday, 19 May (7:40 pm)	Hawthorn 9.7 (61)	def. by	Melbourne 20.16 (136)	MCG (crowd: 42,985)
Saturday, 20 May (2:10 pm)	Richmond 10.9 (69)	def.	Adelaide 9.12 (66)	Telstra Dome (crowd: 24,461)
Saturday, 20 May (2:10 pm)	Fremantle 13.6 (84)	def.	Kangaroos 6.13 (49)	Subiaco Oval (crowd: 34,072)
Saturday, 20 May (7:10 pm)	Collingwood 22.14 (146)	def.	Geelong 6.8 (44)	MCG (crowd: 69,819)
Saturday, 20 May (7:10 pm)	Western Bulldogs 14.6 (90)	def. by	Sydney 17.14 (116)	SCG (crowd: 31,756)
Sunday, 21 May (12:40 pm)	Port Adelaide 10.18 (78)	def. by	Brisbane Lions 22.15 (147)	AAMI Stadium (crowd: 21,970)
Sunday, 21 May (2:10 pm)	Carlton 4.10 (34)	def. by	St Kilda 18.18 (126)	MCG (crowd: 39,908)
Sunday, 21 May (2:10 pm)	Essendon 14.8 (92)	def. by	West Coast 16.17 (113)	Telstra Dome (crowd: 31,434)

=== Round 9 ===
	Round 9 (Green Round)
Friday, 26 May (7:40 pm)	Collingwood 21.13 (139)	def.	Western Bulldogs 16.9 (105)	MCG (crowd: 67,920)
Saturday, 27 May (2:10 pm)	Geelong 12.18 (90)	def. by	Richmond 17.8 (110)	Skilled Stadium (crowd: 23,386)
Saturday, 27 May (1:40 pm)	Adelaide 18.16 (124)	def.	Carlton 9.6 (60)	AAMI Stadium (crowd: 41,157)
Saturday, 27 May (7:10 pm)	Essendon 9.15 (69)	def. by	Port Adelaide 20.9 (129)	Telstra Dome (crowd: 29,232)
Saturday, 27 May (7:10 pm)	Hawthorn 7.12 (54)	def. by	Sydney 19.5 (119)	MCG (crowd: 28,387)
Sunday, 28 May (1:10 pm)	Brisbane Lions 21.15 (141)	def.	Fremantle 10.13 (73)	The Gabba (crowd: 27,999)
Sunday, 28 May (2:10 pm)	St Kilda 10.14 (74)	def.	Kangaroos 8.9 (57)	Telstra Dome (crowd: 30,904)
Sunday, 28 May (2:40 pm)	West Coast 13.19 (97)	def.	Melbourne 11.9 (75)	Subiaco Oval (crowd: 41,032)
This round was marketed as Green Shirt Round, to acknowledge the contribution of new and inexperienced umpires in junior competitions.

=== Round 10 ===
	Round 10
Friday, 2 June (8:10 pm)	Adelaide 30.8 (188)	def.	Essendon 6.14 (50)	AAMI Stadium (crowd: 42,025)
Saturday, 3 June (2:10 pm)	Geelong 15.8 (98)	def. by	West Coast 16.5 (101)	Skilled Stadium (crowd: 24,028)
Saturday, 3 June (2:10 pm)	Western Bulldogs 16.13 (109)	def.	Hawthorn 13.10 (88)	Telstra Dome (crowd: 29,960)
Saturday, 3 June (7:10 pm)	Collingwood 16.13 (109)	def.	Brisbane Lions 12.11 (83)	MCG (crowd: 54,820)
Saturday, 3 June (5:40 pm)	Fremantle 15.10 (100)	def.	Richmond 13.11 (89)	Subiaco Oval (crowd: 36,032)
Sunday, 4 June (1:10 pm)	Kangaroos 14.14 (98)	def. by	Sydney 16.9 (105)	Manuka Oval (crowd: 14,922)
Sunday, 4 June (2:10 pm)	Carlton 12.12 (84)	def. by	Port Adelaide 17.16 (118)	Telstra Dome (crowd: 18,665)
Sunday, 4 June (2:10 pm)	Melbourne 15.13 (103)	def.	St Kilda 13.12 (90)	MCG (crowd: 41,665)
West Coast came back from 54 points down during the third quarter of its game vs Geelong to win by three, it is the biggest comeback to win a game in the Eagles history.

=== Round 11 ===
	Round 11
Friday, 9 June (7:40 pm)	Geelong 20.10 (130)	def.	Essendon 13.10 (88)	Telstra Dome (crowd: 43,600)
Saturday, 10 June (2:10 pm)	Richmond 15.12 (102)	def.	Kangaroos 9.13 (67)	MCG (crowd: 42,841)
Saturday, 10 June (7:10 pm)	Brisbane Lions 8.12 (60)	def. by	Adelaide 10.15 (75)	The Gabba (crowd: 27,516)
Saturday, 10 June (7:10 pm)	Sydney 7.8 (50)	def. by	St Kilda 7.10 (52)	SCG (crowd: 31,146)
Sunday, 11 June (12:40 pm)	Port Adelaide 22.13 (145)	def.	Hawthorn 7.7 (49)	AAMI Stadium (crowd: 24,511)
Sunday, 11 June (2:10 pm)	Western Bulldogs 15.10 (100)	def.	Fremantle 12.14 (86)	Telstra Dome (crowd: 23,805)
Sunday, 11 June (2:40 pm)	West Coast 16.15 (111)	def.	Carlton 15.11 (101)	Subiaco Oval (crowd: 40,090)
Monday, 12 June (2:10 pm)	Melbourne 22.9 (141)	def.	Collingwood 14.10 (94)	MCG (crowd: 78,773)

=== Round 12 ===
	Round 12
Friday, 16 June (7:40 pm)	St Kilda 8.12 (60)	def. by	Adelaide 18.15 (123)	Telstra Dome (crowd: 34,170)
Saturday, 17 June (2:10 pm)	Fremantle 6.16 (52)	def. by	Geelong 18.10 (118)	Subiaco Oval (crowd: 34,236)
Saturday, 17 June (7:10 pm)	Brisbane Lions 14.19 (103)	def. by	Western Bulldogs 22.13 (145)	The Gabba (crowd: 27,745)
Saturday, 17 June (7:10 pm)	Port Adelaide 13.19 (97)	def.	West Coast 8.12 (60)	AAMI Stadium (crowd: 28,125)
Sunday, 18 June (1:10 pm)	Hawthorn 16.9 (105)	def.	Richmond 8.16 (64)	Aurora Stadium (crowd: 20,971)
Sunday, 18 June (2:10 pm)	Essendon 10.15 (75)	def. by	Melbourne 16.15 (111)	Telstra Dome (crowd: 35,019)
Friday, 23 June (7:40 pm)	Kangaroos 18.13 (121)	def.	Carlton 15.12 (102)	Telstra Dome (crowd: 34,110)
Saturday, 24 June (7:10 pm)	Sydney 11.16 (82)	def. by	Collingwood 14.11 (95)	Telstra Stadium (crowd: 60,307)

=== Round 13 ===
	Round 13
Friday, 30 June (7:40 pm)	Kangaroos 14.12 (96)	def.	Essendon 13.11 (89)	Telstra Dome (crowd: 33,747)
Saturday, 1 July (2:10 pm)	Melbourne 18.12 (120)	def.	Port Adelaide 12.10 (82)	MCG (crowd: 24,283)
Saturday, 1 July (2:10 pm)	St Kilda 18.17 (125)	def.	Hawthorn 8.7 (55)	Telstra Dome (crowd: 33,869)
Saturday, 1 July (7:10 pm)	Brisbane Lions 8.23 (71)	def.	Carlton 7.14 (56)	The Gabba (crowd: 29,516)
Saturday, 1 July (7:10 pm)	Sydney 12.19 (91)	def.	Fremantle 9.4 (58)	SCG (crowd: 24,114)
Sunday, 2 July (12:40 pm)	Adelaide 21.21 (147)	def.	Geelong 8.7 (55)	AAMI Stadium (crowd: 41,752)
Sunday, 2 July (2:10 pm)	Richmond 13.14 (92)	def.	Collingwood 6.9 (45)	MCG (crowd: 63,016)
Sunday, 2 July (2:40 pm)	West Coast 8.16 (64)	def. by	Western Bulldogs 10.13 (73)	Subiaco Oval (crowd: 40,375)

=== Round 14 ===
	Round 14
Friday, 7 July (6:40 pm)	Fremantle 19.11 (125)	def.	Essendon 12.16 (88)	Subiaco Oval (crowd: 34,608)
Saturday, 8 July (2:10 pm)	Carlton 11.11 (77)	def. by	Geelong 23.4 (142)	Telstra Dome (crowd: 32,096)
Saturday, 8 July (2:10 pm)	Hawthorn 16.8 (104)	def. by	West Coast 17.12 (114)	MCG (crowd: 21,989)
Saturday, 8 July (7:10 pm)	Melbourne 14.14 (98)	def.	Brisbane Lions 13.12 (90)	The Gabba (crowd: 25,541)
Saturday, 8 July (7:10 pm)	Port Adelaide 6.18 (54)	def. by	Richmond 14.8 (92)	AAMI Stadium (crowd: 25,067)
Sunday, 9 July (1:10 pm)	Sydney 8.14 (62)	def. by	Adelaide 15.11 (101)	SCG (crowd: 36,104)
Sunday, 9 July (2:10 pm)	St Kilda 19.8 (122)	def.	Collingwood 9.9 (63)	Telstra Dome (crowd: 48,564)
Sunday, 9 July (2:10 pm)	Western Bulldogs 12.10 (82)	def. by	Kangaroos 13.16 (94)	MCG (crowd: 28,173)

=== Round 15 ===
	Round 15
Friday, 14 July (7:40 pm)	Richmond 7.10 (52)	def. by	Melbourne 9.16 (70)	MCG (crowd: 60,086)
Saturday, 15 July (2:10 pm)	Essendon 10.11 (71)	def. by	St Kilda 11.8 (74)	MCG (crowd: 33,082)
Saturday, 15 July (2:40 pm)	Adelaide 16.13 (109)	def.	Hawthorn 11.7 (73)	AAMI Stadium (crowd: 37,446)
Saturday, 15 July (7:10 pm)	Kangaroos 11.18 (84)	def. by	Brisbane Lions 12.13 (85)	Telstra Dome (crowd: 22,947)
Saturday, 15 July (5:40 pm)	West Coast 9.13 (67)	def.	Sydney 9.11 (65)	Subiaco Oval (crowd: 40,688)
Sunday, 16 July (1:10 pm)	Geelong 9.14 (68)	def.	Port Adelaide 8.10 (58)	Skilled Stadium (crowd: 19,149)
Sunday, 16 July (2:10 pm)	Carlton 11.14 (80)	def. by	Western Bulldogs 16.14 (110)	Telstra Dome (crowd: 26,418)
Sunday, 16 July (2:10 pm)	Collingwood 15.14 (104)	def. by	Fremantle 18.11 (119)	MCG (crowd: 30,373)

=== Round 16 ===
	Round 16 (Heritage Round)
Friday, 21 July (8:10 pm)	Adelaide 19.10 (124)	def.	Kangaroos 7.10 (52)	AAMI Stadium (crowd: 47,487)
Saturday, 22 July (2:10 pm)	Collingwood 19.13 (127)	def.	West Coast 13.12 (90)	Telstra Dome (crowd: 38,777)
Saturday, 22 July (2:10 pm)	Essendon 16.9 (105)	drew with	Carlton 15.15 (105)	MCG (crowd: 49,181)
Saturday, 22 July (7:10 pm)	Brisbane Lions 11.18 (88)	def.	Hawthorn 11.8 (74)	The Gabba (crowd: 26,738)
Saturday, 22 July (7:10 pm)	Sydney 14.17 (107)	def.	Richmond 7.11 (53)	SCG (crowd: 28,371)
Sunday, 23 July (1:10 pm)	St Kilda 8.16 (64)	def.	Port Adelaide 8.12 (60)	Aurora Stadium (crowd: 16,588)
Sunday, 23 July (2:10 pm)	Geelong 13.12 (90)	def.	Western Bulldogs 13.11 (89)	Telstra Dome (crowd: 39,417)
Sunday, 23 July (2:40 pm)	Fremantle 15.6 (96)	def.	Melbourne 9.13 (67)	Subiaco Oval (crowd: 36,244)
This round was marketed as Heritage Round with clubs wearing heritage style jumpers. Port Adelaide were the only club that didn't wear a Heritage Round jumper due to not being able to wear their "Prison bar" SANFL jumper.; The match between Essendon and Carlton was in the lead dubbed the "Bryce Gibbs Cup" with both teams in the lead up with Gibbs the favourite (and ending up being) to be the number 1 pick of that years draft. Ultimately the match ended as a draw.; Daniel Motlop missed a goal after the siren to win the game for Port Adelaide against St Kilda at Aurora Stadium.

=== Round 17 ===
	Round 17
Friday, 28 July (7:40 pm)	Collingwood 16.17 (113)	def.	Hawthorn 11.2 (68)	MCG (crowd: 54,306)
Saturday, 29 July (2:10 pm)	St Kilda 27.12 (174)	def.	Richmond 10.11 (71)	MCG (crowd: 43,250)
Saturday, 29 July (2:10 pm)	West Coast 26.9 (165)	def.	Adelaide 12.11 (83)	Subiaco Oval (crowd: 40,380)
Saturday, 29 July (7:10 pm)	Essendon 25.10 (160)	def.	Brisbane Lions 18.15 (123)	Telstra Dome (crowd: 32,761)
Saturday, 29 July (7:10 pm)	Port Adelaide 7.8 (50)	def. by	Sydney 10.17 (77)	AAMI Stadium (crowd: 23,183)
Sunday, 30 July (1:10 pm)	Kangaroos 13.12 (90)	def.	Geelong 8.12 (60)	Manuka Oval (crowd: 9,561)
Sunday, 30 July (2:10 pm)	Carlton 13.11 (89)	def. by	Fremantle 15.17 (107)	Telstra Dome (crowd: 17,518)
Sunday, 30 July (2:10 pm)	Melbourne 18.11 (119)	def.	Western Bulldogs 9.14 (68)	MCG (crowd: 36,466)

=== Round 18 ===
	Round 18
Friday, 4 August (7:40 pm)	St Kilda 8.11 (59)	def. by	West Coast 14.14 (98)	Telstra Dome (crowd: 40,177)
Saturday, 5 August (2:10 pm)	Carlton 12.8 (80)	def.	Melbourne 10.13 (73)	Telstra Dome (crowd: 24,113)
Saturday, 5 August (2:10 pm)	Richmond 10.18 (78)	def. by	Western Bulldogs 15.10 (100)	MCG (crowd: 36,339)
Saturday, 5 August (7:10 pm)	Sydney 17.14 (116)	def.	Essendon 11.7 (73)	SCG (crowd: 25,465)
Saturday, 5 August (7:10 pm)	Adelaide 7.16 (58)	def.	Collingwood 7.12 (54)	AAMI Stadium (crowd: 45,658)
Sunday, 6 August (1:10 pm)	Brisbane Lions 13.9 (87)	def. by	Geelong 14.20 (104)	The Gabba (crowd: 28,055)
Sunday, 6 August (2:10 pm)	Kangaroos 12.12 (84)	def.	Port Adelaide 9.11 (65)	Telstra Dome (crowd: 14,815)
Sunday, 6 August (2:40 pm)	Fremantle 14.20 (104)	def.	Hawthorn 7.9 (51)	Subiaco Oval (crowd: 35,017)

=== Round 19 ===
	Round 19
Friday, 11 August (7:40 pm)	Essendon 10.14 (74)	def.	Collingwood 9.7 (61)	MCG (crowd: 62,940)
Saturday, 12 August (2:10 pm)	Melbourne 10.3 (63)	def. by	Sydney 14.11 (95)	MCG (crowd: 43,794)
Saturday, 12 August (2:10 pm)	West Coast 14.23 (107)	def.	Kangaroos 12.9 (81)	Subiaco Oval (crowd: 40,067)
Saturday, 12 August (7:10 pm)	Richmond 21.16 (142)	def.	Brisbane Lions 8.12 (60)	Telstra Dome (crowd: 27,211)
Saturday, 12 August (7:10 pm)	Western Bulldogs 13.13 (91)	def. by	Port Adelaide 14.21 (105)	Marrara Oval (crowd: 14,100)
Sunday, 13 August (12:40 pm)	Adelaide 10.20 (80)	def. by	Fremantle 13.17 (95)	AAMI Stadium (crowd: 43,127)
Sunday, 13 August (2:10 pm)	Geelong 11.14 (80)	def. by	St Kilda 15.13 (103)	Telstra Dome (crowd: 40,986)
Sunday, 13 August (2:10 pm)	Hawthorn 17.11 (113)	def.	Carlton 13.12 (90)	MCG (crowd: 36,817)

=== Round 20 ===
	Round 20
Friday, 18 August (8:10 pm)	Port Adelaide 12.15 (87)	def. by	Collingwood 12.17 (89)	AAMI Stadium (crowd: 30,281)
Saturday, 19 August (2:10 pm)	Geelong 14.6 (90)	def.	Sydney 9.9 (63)	Skilled Stadium (crowd: 21,175)
Saturday, 19 August (2:10 pm)	Western Bulldogs 16.9 (105)	def.	Adelaide 14.14 (98)	MCG (crowd: 29,988)
Saturday, 19 August (7:10 pm)	Essendon 15.16 (106)	def. by	Hawthorn 19.10 (124)	Telstra Dome (crowd: 44,275)
Saturday, 19 August (5:40 pm)	Fremantle 17.12 (114)	def.	St Kilda 7.14 (56)	Subiaco Oval (crowd: 39,069)
Sunday, 20 August (1:10 pm)	Brisbane Lions 7.10 (52)	def. by	West Coast 16.18 (114)	The Gabba (crowd: 23,764)
Sunday, 20 August (2:10 pm)	Carlton 14.11 (95)	def. by	Richmond 21.14 (140)	Telstra Dome (crowd: 37,094)
Sunday, 20 August (2:10 pm)	Kangaroos 12.10 (82)	def. by	Melbourne 20.12 (132)	MCG (crowd: 29,457)

=== Round 21 ===
	Round 21
Friday, 25 August (7:40 pm)	Western Bulldogs 13.14 (92)	def. by	St Kilda 22.10 (142)	Telstra Dome (crowd: 47,120)
Saturday, 26 August (2:10 pm)	Geelong 14.10 (94)	drew with	Melbourne 14.10 (94)	Skilled Stadium (crowd: 23,068)
Saturday, 26 August (2:10 pm)	Hawthorn 7.16 (58)	def.	Kangaroos 4.12 (36)	Aurora Stadium (crowd: 18,836)
Saturday, 26 August (7:10 pm)	Richmond 20.9 (129)	def.	Essendon 16.17 (113)	MCG (crowd: 48,710)
Saturday, 26 August (7:10 pm)	Sydney 14.13 (97)	def.	Brisbane Lions 6.4 (40)	Telstra Stadium (crowd: 37,659)
Sunday, 27 August (12:40 pm)	Port Adelaide 14.11 (95)	def.	Adelaide 11.15 (81)	AAMI Stadium (crowd: 41,549)
Sunday, 27 August (2:10 pm)	Collingwood 24.12 (156)	def.	Carlton 17.10 (112)	MCG (crowd: 57,719)
Sunday, 27 August (2:40 pm)	West Coast 8.13 (61)	def. by	Fremantle 18.10 (118)	Subiaco Oval (crowd: 43,527)

=== Round 22 ===
	Round 22
Friday, 1 September (7:40 pm)	Western Bulldogs 22.15 (147)	def.	Essendon 18.17 (125)	Telstra Dome (crowd: 42,956)
Saturday, 2 September (2:10 pm)	Richmond 12.13 (85)	def. by	West Coast 26.17 (173)	MCG (crowd: 35,106)
Saturday, 2 September (2:40 pm)	Adelaide 23.14 (152)	def.	Melbourne 14.10 (94)	AAMI Stadium (crowd: 41,364)
Saturday, 2 September (7:10 pm)	Brisbane Lions 7.15 (57)	def. by	St Kilda 16.12 (108)	The Gabba (crowd: 27,101)
Saturday, 2 September (5:40 pm)	Fremantle 23.13 (151)	def.	Port Adelaide 9.18 (72)	Subiaco Oval (crowd: 41,121)
Sunday, 3 September (1:10 pm)	Sydney 21.10 (136)	def.	Carlton 6.8 (44)	SCG (crowd: 33,943)
Sunday, 3 September (2:10 pm)	Collingwood 20.19 (139)	def.	Kangaroos 10.11 (71)	MCG (crowd: 49,040)
Sunday, 3 September (2:10 pm)	Hawthorn 21.7 (133)	def.	Geelong 10.12 (72)	Telstra Dome (crowd: 28,188)
The Collingwood v Kangaroos match was the last game that was broadcast on Nine Network. The following season the Seven Network would replace Nine as the AFL free-to-air rights with Network Ten. The game between Hawthorn and Geelong was ultimately the last game broadcast on the Fox Footy Channel. It was also meant to be the last on Foxtel, but early the following year it was announced it would retain the rights as subscription rights holder. However, the Fox Footy Channel did not return.

== Ladder ==
2006 AFL ladder
Pos	Team	Pld	W	L	D	PF	PA	PP	Pts	
1	West Coast (P)	22	17	5	0	2257	1874	120.4	68	Finals series
2	Adelaide	22	16	6	0	2331	1640	142.1	64	Finals series
3	Fremantle	22	15	7	0	2079	1893	109.8	60	Finals series
4	Sydney	22	14	8	0	2098	1630	128.7	56	Finals series
5	Collingwood	22	14	8	0	2345	1965	119.3	56	Finals series
6	St Kilda	22	14	8	0	2074	1752	118.4	56	Finals series
7	Melbourne	22	13	8	1	2146	1957	109.7	54	Finals series
8	Western Bulldogs	22	13	9	0	2311	2173	106.4	52	Finals series
9	Richmond	22	11	11	0	1934	2245	86.1	44	
10	Geelong	22	10	11	1	1982	2002	99.0	42	
11	Hawthorn	22	9	13	0	1834	2140	85.7	36	
12	Port Adelaide	22	8	14	0	1911	2151	88.8	32	
13	Brisbane Lions	22	7	15	0	1844	2239	82.4	28	
14	Kangaroos	22	7	15	0	1754	2167	80.9	28	
15	Essendon	22	3	18	1	2021	2469	81.9	14	
16	Carlton	22	3	18	1	1791	2415	74.2	14	

Source: AFL ladder
Rules for classification: 1) points; 2) percentage; 3) number of points for.
(P) Premiers

=== Ladder progression ===
Numbers highlighted in green indicate that the team finished the round inside the top 8.
Numbers highlighted in blue indicates the team finished first on the ladder in that round.
Numbers highlighted in red indicates the team finished in last place on the ladder in that round.

Team ╲ Round	1	2	3	4	5	6	7	8	9	10	11	12	13	14	15	16	17	18	19	20	21	22
West Coast	4	8	12	16	20	20	24	28	32	36	40	40	40	44	48	48	52	56	60	64	64	68
Adelaide	4	4	8	12	16	20	24	24	28	32	36	40	44	48	52	56	56	60	60	60	60	64
Fremantle	0	4	8	8	12	16	16	20	20	24	24	24	24	28	32	36	40	44	48	52	56	60
Sydney	0	0	4	4	8	12	16	20	24	28	28	28	32	32	32	36	40	44	48	48	52	56
Collingwood	0	4	8	12	16	20	20	24	28	32	32	36	36	36	36	40	44	44	44	48	52	56
St Kilda	0	4	8	8	8	12	12	16	20	20	24	24	28	32	36	40	44	44	48	48	52	56
Melbourne	0	0	0	4	8	12	16	20	20	24	28	32	36	40	44	44	48	48	48	52	54	54
Western Bulldogs	4	8	12	16	16	16	20	20	20	24	28	32	36	36	40	40	40	44	44	48	48	52
Richmond	0	0	0	4	8	12	12	16	20	20	24	24	28	32	32	32	32	32	36	40	44	44
Geelong	4	8	8	8	8	8	12	12	12	12	16	20	20	24	28	32	32	36	36	40	42	42
Hawthorn	4	4	8	12	16	16	16	16	16	16	16	20	20	20	20	20	20	20	24	28	32	36
Port Adelaide	0	4	4	8	8	8	8	8	12	16	20	24	24	24	24	24	24	24	28	28	32	32
Brisbane Lions	0	4	4	4	4	4	8	12	16	16	16	16	20	20	24	28	28	28	28	28	28	28
Kangaroos	4	4	4	4	4	8	8	8	8	8	8	12	16	20	20	20	24	28	28	28	28	28
Essendon	4	4	4	4	4	4	4	4	4	4	4	4	4	4	4	6	10	10	14	14	14	14
Carlton	4	4	4	4	4	4	8	8	8	8	8	8	8	8	8	10	10	14	14	14	14	14

== Finals series ==
Qualifying and elimination finals
9 Sep, Subiaco Oval
1	West Coast	12.12 (84)
4	Sydney	13.7 (85)
10 Sep, MCG
5	Collingwood	11.14 (80)
8	Western Bulldogs	18.13 (121)
8 Sep, MCG
6	St Kilda	10.12 (72)
7	Melbourne	13.12 (90)
9 Sep, AAMI Stadium
2	Adelaide	10.16 (76)
3	Fremantle	7.4 (46)

Semi-finals
16 Sep, Subiaco Oval
West Coast	16.17 (113)
Western Bulldogs	5.9 (39)
15 Sep, Subiaco Oval
Fremantle	14.18 (102)
Melbourne	11.8 (74)

Preliminary finals
22 Sep, Telstra Stadium
Sydney	19.13 (127)
Fremantle	14.8 (92)
23 Sep, AAMI Stadium
Adelaide	11.9 (75)
West Coast	11.19 (85)

Grand final
30 Sep, MCG
Sydney	12.12 (84)
West Coast	12.13 (85)

=== Week one ===
	Qualifying finals
QF1: Saturday, 9 September (5:30 pm)	West Coast 12.12 (84)	def. by	Sydney 13.7 (85)	Subiaco Oval (crowd: 43,116)
QF2: Saturday, 9 September (2:30 pm)	Adelaide 10.16 (76)	def.	Fremantle 7.4 (46)	AAMI Stadium (crowd: 42,208)

	Elimination finals
EF2: Friday, 8 September (7:30 pm)	St Kilda 10.12 (72)	def. by	Melbourne 13.12 (90)	MCG (crowd: 67,528)
EF1: Sunday, 10 September (2:30 pm)	Collingwood 11.14 (80)	def. by	Western Bulldogs 18.13 (121)	MCG (crowd: 84,284)

=== Week two ===
	Semi-finals
SF2: Friday, 15 September (6:30 pm)	Fremantle 14.18 (102)	def.	Melbourne 11.8 (74)	Subiaco Oval (crowd: 42,505)
SF1: Saturday, 16 September (5:30 pm)	West Coast 16.17 (113)	def.	Western Bulldogs 5.9 (39)	Subiaco Oval (crowd: 43,219)

=== Week three ===
	Preliminary Finals
PF1: Friday, 22 September (8:00 pm)	Sydney 19.13 (127)	def.	Fremantle 14.8 (92)	Telstra Stadium (crowd: 61,373)	Report
PF2: Saturday, 23 September (3:00 pm)	Adelaide 11.9 (75)	def. by	West Coast 11.19 (85)	AAMI Stadium (crowd: 50,514)	Report
This was the first time a Victorian team failed to reach the preliminary finals, with all four preliminary finalists teams from other states.

=== Week four ===
Grand final
Saturday, 30 September (2:30 pm)	Sydney	def. by	West Coast	MCG (crowd: 97,431)	Report
1.4 (10); 4.6 (30); 8.11 (59); 12.12 (84)	Q1; Q2; Q3; Final	4.2 (26); 8.7 (55); 10.10 (70); 12.13 (85)	Umpires: M Vozzo, B Allen, D Goldspink; Norm Smith Medal: Andrew Embley (West Coast); Television broadcast: Network Ten; National anthem: Brian Mannix, John Paul Young, Daryl Braithwaite and Shane Howard
M O'Loughlin, N Davis 3 B Matthews, L Roberts-Thomson, A Goodes, A Schneider, R O'Keefe, N Malceski 1	Goals	Q Lynch 3 A Embley, A Hansen, B Cousins 2 C Judd, S Armstrong, A Hunter 1
N Fosdike, T Richards T Kennelly, M O'Loughlin, J McVeigh, B Kirk, A Goodes	Best	A Embley, D Chick, C Judd, D Glass, Q Lynch, A Selwood, M Braun, D Cox, D Kerr
L Ablett	Injuries	Nil
Nil	Reports	Nil
The final margin was the closest winning margin in a grand final since 1966.

== Awards ==
- The Brownlow Medal was awarded 25 September 2006 to Adam Goodes from Sydney, for the AFL's best and fairest player.
- The Leigh Matthews Trophy was awarded to Chris Judd from West Coast as the AFL Players Association's most valuable player.
- The Coleman Medal was awarded to Brendan Fevola from Carlton. It was the first time since 1965 that the season's leading goalkicker came from the wooden spoon side, and the fourth (and, as of 2022, most recent) time overall.
- The Norm Smith Medal was awarded to Andrew Embley from West Coast as the player best afield in the 2006 AFL Grand Final.
- The AFL Rising Star award goes to Danyle Pearce from Port Adelaide.
- The McClelland Trophy was awarded to West Coast for finishing on top of the ladder after the regular season.
- The Wooden Spoon was "awarded" to Carlton for finishing 16th on the AFL ladder for the second straight year under Denis Pagan.
- The 2006 All-Australian Team has been announced, with 10 debutants and Brad Johnson named as captain.
- The AFL Mark of the Year was awarded to Brad Ottens from Geelong for his mark in round 5.
- The AFL Goal of the Year was awarded to Eddie Betts from Carlton for his goal in round 21.

=== Best and fairests ===
- Adelaide: Simon Goodwin
- Brisbane: Simon Black
- Carlton: Lance Whitnall
- Collingwood: Alan Didak
- Essendon: Scott Lucas
- Fremantle: Matthew Pavlich
- Geelong: Paul Chapman
- Hawthorn: Sam Mitchell
- Kangaroos: Brady Rawlings
- Melbourne: James McDonald
- Port Adelaide: Brendon Lade
- Richmond: Kane Johnson
- St Kilda: Nick Riewoldt
- Sydney: Adam Goodes
- West Coast: Chris Judd
- Western Bulldogs: Brad Johnson

== Notable events ==
- The Melbourne Cricket Ground was unavailable until round 4, due to its use as the main athletics stadium at the 2006 Commonwealth Games, which concluded just four days prior to the season starting.
- Matthew Lloyd, in only his third game as Essendon captain, injured his hamstring against the Western Bulldogs, ending his season. This marked the Bulldogs' first victory over Essendon since inflicting their only defeat of the 2000 season. Despite a first round thrashing of reigning premiers Sydney, in which Lloyd kicked eight goals on Leo Barry, Essendon would suffer its worst season since 1933, winning only two further matches and drawing one against Carlton, and just avoiding the wooden spoon to the Blues on percentage.
- In Round 5, Fremantle and St Kilda's game ended in controversy after the final siren was not heard by umpires, with the extra time allowing St Kilda to level the scores – the result was changed by the AFL commission later in the week on the basis that the timekeeper had failed to perform his duties.
  - The amended result proved crucial to the end-of-season ladder standings, because had the draw stood, St Kilda would have finished in the top four at the expense of reigning premiers Sydney, which would've finished fifth and therefore missed out on the double chance in the finals.
- Richmond suffered three 100-point losses in season 2006, against the Western Bulldogs in round 1 (115 points), Sydney in round 7 (118 points) and St Kilda in round 17 (103 points).
- A struggling Richmond team defeated league-leaders Adelaide in round 8 in an often-discussed game. To counteract Adelaide's strong flood, Richmond slowly built up a lead by patiently controlling the football without ever kicking to a contest, a move described as both boring and brilliant. In the final quarter, Adelaide were forced to switch to man-on-man tactics, almost erasing the deficit, but falling three points short. In executing this plan, Richmond took 181 marks, which is the highest amount ever (recorded since 1987).
- In round 8, Brendan Fevola became the first player to kick all of his team's goals in a game since Mark Arceri in 1991 (also while playing for Carlton, kicking their only goal). Of Carlton's 4.10 (34), Fevola contributed 4.5 (29), Simon Wiggins scored two behinds, and three behinds were rushed. He also became the first player in 41 years to win a Coleman Medal from the wooden spoon winning side.
- St Kilda broke two long winning droughts at the SCG and the Gabba by beating Sydney and Brisbane in rounds 11 and 22 respectively. The latter match was Michael Voss' final game for the Lions.
- For the first time in VFL/AFL history, four non-Victorian teams filled the top four with West Coast, Adelaide, Fremantle and Sydney all earning the double chance. The remainder of the top eight were filled by teams based in Victoria.
- Bottom teams Essendon and Carlton had a draw in round 16, 2006. Carlton's Eddie Betts scored the match-tying goal with under one minute remaining to deny Essendon what would have been just their second win for the season. Essendon would eventually achieve that the following week. This match was dubbed the "Bryce Gibbs Cup", named after the young Glenelg midfielder who was expected to be, and ultimately was, drafted with the first pick at the end of the year, by the media as both teams were firmly rooted to the bottom of the ladder leading into their match.
- In the second Qualifying Final, Sydney beat minor premiers West Coast by a solitary point, the final scores reading 85 to 84. When the teams met again in the grand final, the final scores were also 85 to 84, but it was West Coast that claimed the victory.
- Rohan Smith and Scott West each played their 300th games for the Western Bulldogs in the club's 74-point defeat to West Coast in the semi-final. For Smith, this was his final AFL game.
- A major flaw of the fixture was that the previous season's Grand Finalists, West Coast and Sydney, did not meet until round 15 of the regular season. The 294-day wait between the 2005 Grand Final and their round 15 rematch on July 15 set a record for the longest wait between a Grand Final and the rematch, until this was surpassed in 2020 (a 300-day wait for Richmond and Greater Western Sydney between their meeting in the 2019 Grand Final and their rematch in Round 8 of the COVID-19-affected 2020 season).

== Player changes ==
=== Retirements ===
Name	Date of birth	Club	Round Retired	Career Games	Career Goals	Reason
Justin Leppitsch	10 October 1975	Brisbane Lions	Round 10	227	194	Back-related calf injury
Gavin Wanganeen	18 June 1973	Port Adelaide	Round 10	300	202	Injured knee
Paul Williams	3 April 1973	Sydney	Round 14	306	307	Fractured shoulder
Blake Caracella	15 March 1977	Collingwood	Round 17	187	218	Fractured spinal cord/vertebrae
Peter Riccardi	17 December 1972	Geelong	Round 19	288	286	Hamstring injury
Josh Francou	7 August 1974	Port Adelaide	Round 20	156	72	Long-term knee injury
Jade Rawlings	9 October 1977	Kangaroos	Round 21	148	96	Long-term knee injury
Dean Rioli	20 May 1978	Essendon	Round 20	100	91	Hamstring, wrist and knee injuries

==== End of season ====
- John Barker – Hawthorn
- Mark Chaffey – Richmond
- Barnaby French – Carlton
- Saverio Rocca – Kangaroos
- Jarrad Schofield – Fremantle
- Brad Scott – Brisbane Lions
- Greg Stafford – Richmond
- Chad Morrison – Collingwood
- Adam Kingsley – Port Adelaide
- Stephen Powell – St Kilda
- Justin Peckett – St Kilda
- Michael Voss – Brisbane Lions (due to being contracted until the end of the 2007 AFL season he was still on Brisbane's list in 2007)
- Rohan Smith – Western Bulldogs
- Drew Banfield – West Coast

== Club captains ==
Club	Captain(s)	Vice Captain(s)/Leadership Group
Adelaide	Mark Ricciuto	Simon Goodwin, Tyson Edwards, Nathan Bassett and Brett Burton
Brisbane Lions	Simon Black, Jonathan Brown, Chris Johnson, Nigel Lappin and Luke Power	
Carlton	Lance Whitnall	Nick Stevens, Kade Simpson (interim)
Collingwood	Nathan Buckley	James Clement (vc), Josh Fraser (deputy vc) and Ben Johnson (deputy vc)
Essendon	Matthew Lloyd and David Hille (acting)	Mark McVeigh (vc), Andrew Welsh, Scott Lucas and Dustin Fletcher
Fremantle	Peter Bell	Matthew Pavlich
Geelong	Tom Harley	Cameron Ling and Cameron Mooney (deputy)
Hawthorn	Richard Vandenberg	Luke Hodge and Sam Mitchell
Kangaroos	Adam Simpson	Brent Harvey
Melbourne	David Neitz	Cameron Bruce, Brad Green, Brock McLean and James McDonald
Port Adelaide	Warren Tredrea	Shaun Burgoyne, Brendon Lade, Michael Wilson and Chad Cornes
Richmond	Kane Johnson	Nathan Brown and Joel Bowden (deputy)
St Kilda	Luke Ball	
Sydney	Leo Barry, Barry Hall and Brett Kirk	
West Coast	Chris Judd	Andrew Embley, Darren Glass and Dean Cox
Western Bulldogs	Brad Johnson	Scott West, Robert Murphy, Daniel Cross and Daniel Giansiracusa

=== Delistings ===
- Jayden Attard – Brisbane Lions
- Matthew Ball – Hawthorn
- Matthew Bishop – Port Adelaide
- Luke Forsyth – Brisbane Lions
- Ben Hart – Adelaide
- Clark Keating – Brisbane Lions
- Andrew Kellaway – Richmond
- Troy Makepeace – Kangaroos
- Marty Pask – Brisbane Lions
- Justin Perkins – Kangaroos
- Mark Powell – Kangaroos
- Cameron Thurley – Kangaroos

== See also ==
- 2006 AFL finals series
- List of 2006 AFL debuts
- 2006 Collingwood Football Club season
- 2006 Sydney Swans season
- List of Australian Football League premiers
