= Quinten Lynch =

Australian rules footballer, born 1983

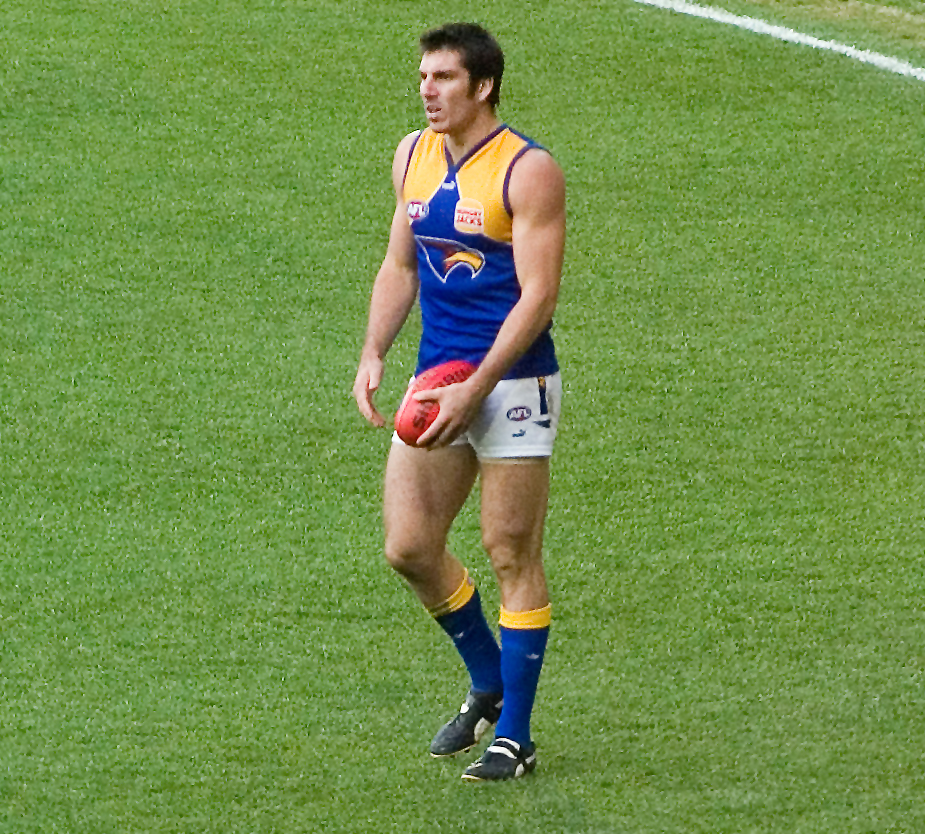
- Lynch playing for West Coast in 2005

Personal information
- Full name: Quinten Peter Lynch
- Nicknames: "Big Q", "Q-Stick", "The Big Unit", "TBU"
- Born: 24 January 1983 (age 43); Goldfields-Esperance, Western Australia
- Original team: Gibson(EDFA)/West Perth(WAFL)
- Draft: 19th overall, 2002 Rookie Draft
- Height: 192 cm (6 ft 4 in)
- Weight: 103 kg (227 lb)
- Position: Utility

Playing career
Years	Club	Games (Goals)
2001–2012	West Perth	47 (51)
2002–2012	West Coast	209 (281)
2013–2014	Collingwood	18 (9)

Career highlights
- West Perth premiership side 2003; West Coast premiership player: 2006; West Coast leading goalkicker 2006, 2007

Quinten Peter Lynch (born 24 January 1983) is a former Australian rules footballer who played with the Collingwood Football Club and the West Coast Eagles in the Australian Football League (AFL). Originally from Grass Patch, a rural farming community near Esperance, Western Australia, he played for the West Perth Football Club in the West Australian Football League (WAFL) before being recruited to West Coast with the 19th pick overall in the 2002 Rookie Draft.

A utility player, Lynch began his career as a defender, but later switched to the forward line, leading West Coast's goalkicking in 2006 and 2007 as well as playing in the club's 2006 premiership side. He also finished second in the club's best and fairest award in 2008. Lynch quit West Coast at the end of the 2012 season, moving to Collingwood under newly implemented free agency rules. Overall, he played 209 games for West Coast.

== Career ==
=== West Coast ===
Originally from Grass Patch, a farming community in the Goldfields-Esperance region of Western Australia, Lynch attended Aquinas College, Perth, where he was captain of the First XVIII team that won the Alcock Cup, and also rowed in the school's First VIII. He was recruited to the WAFL club West Perth, and in 2001 won selection as the All-Australian centre half-back at the under-18 carnival. He was selected by the West Coast Eagles in the 2002 Rookie Draft at Pick 19.

In 2002, he was elevated from the Rookie List after as a replacement for Phillip Read, who had sustained a long-term knee injury. He was selected to represent the WAFL in a match against the QAFL, but was instead selected to play his debut match for the West Coast Eagles. He went on to play 11 games that season.

Lynch spent all of 2003 playing in the WAFL. He returned to the Eagles in 2004, playing mainly as a defender. In May, he was charged with drink-driving, reckless driving and leaving the scene of an accident, after failing to stop at a random breath test while drink driving.

He played in the forward line for almost all of the 2005 season, playing all 22 games of the regular season, and the qualifying final, but not being selected for the Preliminary and Grand Finals. During that year he kicked 31 goals, coming second on the Eagles' goal-kicking list. However, he was criticised for his tendency to drop simple chest marks.

During the 2006 pre-season, Lynch underwent mental therapy aimed at improving his marking. His form improved considerably, and he took 43 marks in the first eight rounds of the regular season. During the season he kicked four goals in one game, five in another, and a career-best eight in the Round 20 match against the Brisbane Lions. He kicked a total of 65 goals for the year, making him the first Eagle to kick over 50 goals in one season since Scott Cummings. In the 2006 finals series, he kicked more goals than any other player for that year. He was the Eagles' leading scorer in the 2006 grand final, kicking three goals in the Eagles' one-point victory.

2007 did not start well for Lynch, with his goalkicking ratio dropping under 50% at one stage. His marking, however, had improved considerably when compared to that to the two previous years. Towards the end of the season his kicking noticeably improved, kicking a 7-goal haul against Richmond in Round 20. He finished the home and away season with 48 goals, adding another four in the two finals West Coast played in. Lynch was one of eight Eagles to have played all 24 games in 2007.

The 2008 season saw a slightly different role for Lynch as the season progressed. He rarely misses games and with a large injury list and poor club performance through the season he started to play a more midfield role, with his big body around the contest and booming kick being valuable weapons. A valuable player for the Eagles due to his durability and hard work, although he did not kick as many goals in season 2008 as in previous years. Lynch played his 200th AFL game in Round 13, 2012, against his future club, Collingwood.

=== Collingwood ===
At the end of the 2012 season, Lynch announced his intention to quit West Coast and become an unrestricted free agent, taking advantage of newly introduced rules allowing players over a certain games threshold to bypass the AFL's draft and trade week. He had previously been offered a one-year contract by West Coast, which he turned down. A number of clubs were considered chances to sign Lynch, with Carlton, Collingwood and Melbourne each having expressed interest in signing him. He eventually chose to sign a two-year contract with Collingwood.

=== Retirement ===
On 25 August 2014, Lynch announced that he will retire at the end of Collingwood's 2014 AFL and VFL campaigns.

== Personal life ==
Lynch married Daneka O'Brien in December 2008 at a ceremony in Margaret River, after dating for seven years. The couple have three children. The couple took over a clothing business, O'Brien's Clothing Co., from O'Brien's parents in May 2011, and own two properties in Western Australia: a house in Waterford and a farming property near Narembeen.

== Statistics ==
Legend
G	Goals	K	Kicks	D	Disposals	T	Tackles
B	Behinds	H	Handballs	M	Marks	H/O	Hit-outs

Season	Team	No.	Games	Totals								Averages (per game)							
Season	Team	No.	Games	G	B	K	H	D	M	T	H/O	G	B	K	H	D	M	T	H/O
2002	West Coast	45	11	17	11	69	25	94	33	9	14	1.5	1.0	6.3	2.3	8.5	3.0	0.8	1.3
2003	West Coast	21	0	—	—	—	—	—	—	—	—	—	—	—	—	—	—	—	—
2004	West Coast	21	22	6	2	173	80	253	72	30	9	0.3	0.1	7.9	3.6	11.5	3.3	1.4	0.4
2005	West Coast	21	23	31	22	168	49	217	91	22	48	1.4	1.0	7.3	2.1	9.4	4.0	1.0	2.1
2006	West Coast	21	26	65	33	253	111	364	143	31	37	2.5	1.3	9.7	4.3	14.0	5.5	1.2	1.4
2007	West Coast	21	24	52	46	290	84	374	167	31	18	2.2	1.9	12.1	3.5	15.6	7.0	1.3	0.8
2008	West Coast	21	22	23	20	280	124	404	143	42	49	1.0	0.9	12.7	5.6	18.4	6.5	1.9	2.2
2009	West Coast	21	22	18	24	279	156	435	127	39	147	0.8	1.1	12.7	7.1	19.8	5.8	1.8	6.7
2010	West Coast	21	14	8	17	136	76	212	80	23	18	0.6	1.2	9.7	5.4	15.1	5.7	1.6	1.3
2011	West Coast	21	24	28	20	262	125	387	157	33	44	1.2	0.8	10.9	5.2	16.1	6.5	1.4	1.8
2012	West Coast	21	21	33	20	189	74	263	113	33	24	1.6	1.0	9.0	3.5	12.5	5.4	1.6	1.1
2013	Collingwood	21	18	9	10	149	109	258	99	20	129	0.5	0.6	8.3	6.1	14.3	5.5	1.1	7.2
2014	Collingwood	21	0	—	—	—	—	—	—	—	—	—	—	—	—	—	—	—	—
Career			227	290	225	2248	1013	3261	1225	309	537	1.3	1.0	9.9	4.5	14.4	5.4	1.4	2.4
