= 2006 Sydney Swans season =

Sydney Swans
2006 season
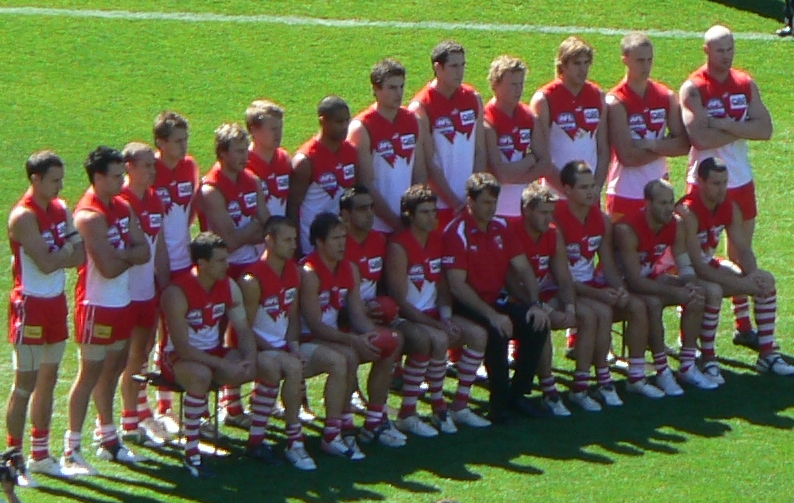
- 2006 Grand Final squad
- Coach: Paul Roos
- Captains: Barry Hall, Brett Kirk & Leo Barry
- Home ground: SCG
- Pre-season competition: First round
- AFL season: 4th
- Finals series: Runners-up
- Best and Fairest: Adam Goodes
- Leading goalkicker: Barry Hall (78)

This article covers the 2006 season of the Sydney Swans, a team in the Australian Football League (AFL).

== Captains ==
On 16 December 2005, the Sydney Swans announced they would use three captains over the season, following on from the 2005 season, where they rotated among six captains after Stuart Maxfield resigned from the captaincy. The three captains are Barry Hall, Brett Kirk and Leo Barry. The captaincy will not be rotated, but each will be captain in each game.

== Club list ==
The 2006 squad consisted of the following players. The list was finalised in December 2005 following a 2nd list lodgement on 18 November, the main draft on 26 November, and pre-season draft and rookie draft on 14 December.

=== Player list ===
Name	No.	Height	Weight	Birth date	Debut	Previous clubs	2006 games	Career games	2006 goals	Career goals
Ablett, Luke	20	184	92	22 November 1982	2002	Drouin, Gippsland U18	7	61	5	17
Barry, Leo	21	184	91	19 May 1977	1995	Deniliquin (NSW)	7	178	0	50
Bevan, Paul	42	183	82	27 September 1984	2004	Western Suburbs, NSW-ACT U18	0	39	0	10
Bolton, Craig	6	190	89	31 May 1980	2000	Eastlake, NSW-ACT U18, Brisbane	7	110	3	20
Bolton, Jude	24	182	85	15 March 1980	1999	Aberfeldie, Calder U18	7	146	6	75
Brabazon, Ryan	34	181	72	26 December 1986	****	Claremont (WA)	0	0	0	0
Buchanan, Amon	32	179	84	10 October 1982	2002	Colac, Geelong U18	7	55	4	25
Chambers, Paul	23	196	100	23 June 1982	2002	Melton South, Western U18, Geelong	7	39	0	5
Crouch, Jared	28	173	81	5 March 1978	1998	Norwood (SA)	7	189	3	45
Davis, Matthew	44	189	80	23 June 1986	****	North Adelaide (SA)	0	0	0	0
Davis, Nick	2	184	85	30 March 1980	1999	St George, NSW-ACT U18, Collingwood	5	135	6	182
Dempster, Sean	26	191	87	20 January 1984	2005	Snowy Rovers, Gippsland U18	3	25	1	1
Doyle, Stephen	15	204	105	13 July 1981	2000	South Adelaide (SA)	1	40	1	18
Ericksen, Andrew	18	204	93	17 July 1985	****	Scotch College, Sandringham U18	0	0	0	0
Fosdike, Nic	12	179	82	26 February 1980	1999	Norwood (SA)	7	123	2	55
Goodes, Adam	37	194	98	8 January 1980	1999	Horsham, North Ballarat U18	4	165	7	173
Grundy, Heath	39	192	97	2 June 1986	2006	Norwood (SA)	0	0	0	0
Hall, Barry	1	194	102	8 February 1977	1996	Broadford, Murray U18, St Kilda	7	186	25	442
Jolly, Darren	16	200	104	6 November 1981	2001	North Ballarat, Melbourne	7	79	0	21
Kennelly, Tadhg	17	190	90	1 July 1981	2001	Ireland	4	105	0	27
Kirk, Brett	31	184	80	25 October 1976	1999	North Albury (NSW)	7	130	2	53
Laidlaw, Matthew	22	185	83	9 February 1987	****	Oakleigh Chargers	0	0	0	0
Malceski, Nick	9	189	84	15 August 1984	2005	North Ringwood, Eastern U18	5	10	5	6
Mathews, Ben	4	181	86	29 November 1978	1997	Corowa-Rutherglan (NSW), Murray U18	5	164	3	33
McVeigh, Jarrad	3	184	81	7 April 1985	2004	Pennant Hills, NSW-ACT U18	7	40	6.3	16.16
Moore, Jarred	33	178	84	6 March 1986	2005	Langwarrin, Dandenong U18	0	5	0.0	1.4
O'Keefe, Ryan	5	188	90	24 January 1981	2000	Strathmore, Calder U18	7	100	7.8	107.75
O'Loughlin, Michael	19	189	92	20 February 1977	1995	Central District (SA)	7	229	13.6	387.209
Richards, Ted	25	192	95	11 January 1983	2002	Xavier College, Sandringham U18, Essendon	7	40	2.2	21.12
Roberts-Thomson, Lewis	30	194	97	8 September 1983	2003	North Shore (NSW), NSW-ACT U18	7	55	0.0	5.8
Schmidt, Tim	36	180	84	14 March 1986	2006	West Adelaide (SA)	0	0	0	0
Schneider, Adam	13	177	78	12 May 1984	2003	Osborne, NSW-ACT U18	7	59	6.2	56.45
Shaw, Earl	45	199	97	17 December 1986	****	Campbelltown (NSW)	0	0	0	0
Spriggs, David	8	175	76	25 January 1981	2000	Beaumaris, Prahran U18, Geelong	0	69	0.0	20.34
Thornton, Kristin	27	183	74	5 March 1988	****	Peel Thunder	0	0	0	0
Vogels, Luke	38	194	92	7 June 1983	2005	Terang, Geelong U18, Terang-Mortlake	0	11	0.0	7.5
Williams, Paul	10	177	83	3 April 1973	1991	North Hobart (Tas), Collingwood	6	300	1.3	304.?
Willoughby, Josh	7	176	78	11 January 1986	****	Glenelg (SA)	0	0	0	0

Statistics are as of 15 May 2006, after Round 7.

=== Rookie list ===
Name	No.	Height	Weight	Birth date	Debut	Previous clubs	2006 games	Career games	2006 goals	Career goals
Barlow, Ed	41	194	92	27 January 1987	****	Bega, Scotch College, Oakleigh U18	0	0	0	0
Currie, Paul	40	192	79	9 February 1987	****	Eltham, Northern U18	0	0	0	0
Garrubba, Stefan	43	179	78	30 August 1986	****	Caulfield Grammar, Dandenong U18	0	0	0	0
Jack, Kieran	48	176	76	28 June 1987	****	Pennant Hills, NSW-ACT U18	0	0	0	0
Phillips, Simon	47	173	65	5 April 1987	****	St Pauls, Sandringham U18	0	0	0	0
Prior, Adam	49	188	93	19 January 1987	****	North Albury, Murray U18	0	0	0	0
Rowe, Sam	46	196	86	19 November 1987	****	North Albury, Murray U18	0	0	0	0
Simpkin, Jonathan	29	181	76	28 November 1987	****	Colac, Geelong U18	0	0	0	0
Wall, James	35	198	80	5 January 1987	****	St Bernards, Calder U18	0	0	0	0

=== Changes from 2005 list ===
==== Additions ====
- Exchange period – received:
1. Paul Chambers (Geelong)
2. Ted Richards (Essendon)
- Rookie elevation:
1. Heath Grundy
2. Earl Shaw
3. Luke Vogels
- Father/son selection:
  - None
- NAB AFL Draft (26 November 2005):
1. Matthew Laidlaw (Round 4; Overall pick 51; from Oakleigh Chargers)
2. Kristin Thornton (Round 4; Overall pick 54; from Peel Thunder)
3. Ryan Brabazon (Round 4; Overall pick 59; from Claremont (WAFL))
- NAB AFL Pre-Season Draft:
- NAB AFL Rookie Draft (13 December 2005):
1. Simpkin, Jonathan (Pick 16; from Geelong Falcons)
2. Wall, James (Pick 32; from Calder Cannons)
3. Currie, Paul (Pick 45; from Northern Knights)
4. Phillips, Simon (Pick 54; from Sandringham Dragons)
5. Jack, Kieran (Pick 57; from NSW-ACT Rams)
6. Barlow, Ed (Pick 58; from Oakleigh Chargers)
7. Prior, Adam (Pick 59; from Murray Bushrangers)
8. Rowe, Sam (Pick 60; from Murray Bushrangers)

==== Deletions ====
- Retired:
1. Jason Ball
2. Heath James
3. Stuart Maxfield
4. Matthew Nicks
5. Andrew Schauble
- Exchange period – traded:
1. Mark Powell (to Kangaroos)
2. Jason Saddington (to Carlton)
- Delisted:
1. Ben Fixter
2. Jarrad Sundqvist
3. Guy Campbell (rookie)
4. Ed Clarke (rookie)
5. Andrew Hayes (rookie)
6. Nick Potter (rookie)
- Pre-season Draft:
1. Ben Fixter (to Brisbane Lions)

== Games ==
=== Exhibition and trial games ===
Date	Local time	Opponent	Home/away	Venue	Result	Score
15 January^{1}	1:30 p.m.	Kangaroos	Neutral	Drake Stadium, Los Angeles	Lost by 48 pts	6.2 (38) to 13.8 (86)
17 February	7:00 p.m.	Essendon Bombers	Home	North Sydney Oval	Lost by 18 pts	10.11 (71) to 13.11 (89)
3 March^{2}	4:00 p.m.	Essendon Bombers	Away	Optus Oval	Lost by 32 pts	8.5 (53) to 12.13 (85)
11 March^{2}	7:10 p.m.	Richmond Tigers	Neutral	Carrara Stadium	Lost by 40 pts	7.7 (49) to 13.11 (89)
18 March^{2}	1:45 p.m.	St Kilda Saints	Neutral	No.1 Sports Ground, Newcastle	Won by 17 pts	12.19 (91) to 11.8 (74)

^{1}: Exhibition game as part of Australia week in the USA
^{2}: NAB Regional Challenge game

=== NAB Cup ===
Match number	Date	Local time	Opponent	Home/away	Venue	Result	Score
3	25 February	2:10 p.m.	Kangaroos	Away	Manuka Oval	Lost by 32 pts	0.5.7 (37) to 1.8.11 (69)

=== Home and away ===
Round	Date	Local time	Opponent	Home or away	Venue	Result	Score	Posn. on ladder
1	1 April	7:10 p.m.	Essendon Bombers	Away	Telstra Dome	Lost by 27	12.9 (81) to 17.6 (108)	12
2	9 April	1:10 p.m.	Port Adelaide Power	Home	S.C.G.	Lost by 26	11.14 (80) to 15.16 (106)	14
3	15 April	7:10 p.m.	Carlton Blues	Away	Telstra Dome	Won by 7	12.9 (81) to 11.8 (74)	12
4	23 April	1:10 p.m.	Melbourne Demons	Home	S.C.G.	Lost by 5	13.14 (92) to 15.7 (97)	12
5	29 April	7:10 p.m.	Geelong Cats	Home	Telstra Stadium	Won by 22	15.17 (107) to 13.7 (85)	9
6	7 May	1:10 p.m.	Brisbane Lions	Away	Gabba	Won by 32	15.12 (102) to 10.10 (70)	8
7	13 May	2:10 p.m.	Richmond Tigers	Away	Telstra Dome	Won by 118	28.12 (180) to 9.8 (62)	5
8	20 May	7:10 p.m.	Western Bulldogs	Away	S.C.G.	Won by 26	17.14 (116) to 14.6 (90)	4
9	27 May	7:10 p.m.	Hawthorn Hawks	Away	M.C.G.	Won by 65	19.5 (119) to 7.12 (54)	4
10	4 June	1:10 p.m.	Kangaroos	Away	Manuka Oval	Won by 7	16.9 (105) to 14.14 (98)	4
11	10 June	7:10 p.m.	St Kilda Saints	Home	S.C.G.	Lost by 2	7.8 (50) to 7.10 (52)	4
12	24 June	7:10 p.m.	Collingwood Magpies	Home	Telstra Stadium	Lost by 13	11.16 (82) to 14.11 (95)	6
13	1 July	7:10 p.m.	Fremantle Dockers	Home	S.C.G.	Won by 33	12.19 (91) to 9.4 (58)	6
14	9 July	1:10 p.m.	Adelaide Crows	Home	S.C.G.	Lost by 39	8.14 (62) to 15.11 (101)	6
15	15 July	5:40 p.m.	West Coast Eagles	Away	Subiaco Oval	Lost by 2	9.11 (65) to 9.13 (67)	7
16	22 July	7:10 p.m.	Richmond Tigers	Home	S.C.G.	Won by 48	14.17 (101) to 7.11 (53)	7
17	29 July	7:10 p.m.	Port Adelaide Power	Away	AAMI Stadium	Won by 27	10.17 (77) to 7.8 (50)	6
18	5 August	7:10 p.m.	Essendon Bombers	Home	S.C.G.	Won by 43	17.14 (116) to 11.7 (73)	4
19	12 August	2:10 p.m.	Melbourne Demons	Away	M.C.G.	Won by 32	14.11 (95) to 10.3 (63)	3
20	19 August	2:10 p.m.	Geelong Cats	Away	Skilled Stadium	Lost by 27	9.9 (63) to 14.6 (90)	5
21	26 August	7:10 p.m.	Brisbane Lions	Home	Telstra Stadium	Won by 57	14.13 (97) to 6.4 (40)	5
22	3 September	1:10 p.m.	Carlton Blues	Home	S.C.G.	Won by 92	21.10 (136) to 6.8 (44)	4

=== Finals ===
Week	Date	Local time	Opponent	Home or away	Venue	Result	Score
1	9 September	5:30 p.m.	West Coast Eagles	Away	Subiaco Oval	Won by 1	13.7 (85) to 12.12 (84)
3	22 September	8:00 p.m.	Fremantle Dockers	Home	Telstra Stadium	Won by 35	19.13 (127) to 14.8 (92)
4	30 September	2:00 p.m.	West Coast Eagles	Away	M.C.G.	Lost by 1	12.12 (84) to 12.13 (85)

== See also ==
- 2006 AFL season
