= Craig Bolton =

Australian rules footballer

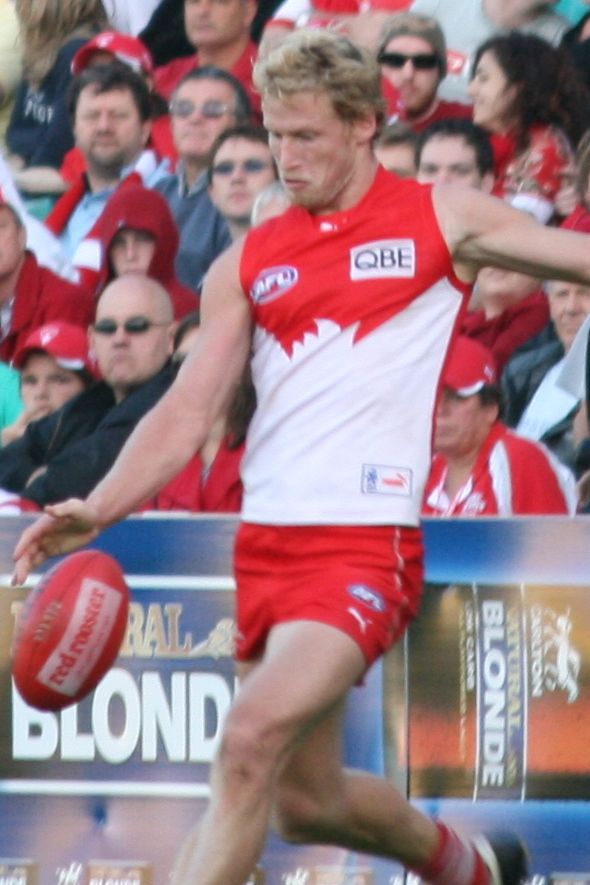
- Bolton with Sydney in 2009

Personal information
- Full name: Craig Bolton
- Born: 31 May 1980 (age 46)
- Original team: NSW/ACT Rams (TAC Cup)
- Draft: No. 33, 1998 National Draft, Brisbane Lions; No. 3, 2003 Pre-Season Draft, Sydney
- Height: 190 cm (6 ft 3 in)
- Weight: 87 kg (192 lb)
- Position: Defender

Playing career^{1}
Years	Club	Games (Goals)
1999–2002	Brisbane Lions	29 (10)
2003–2010	Sydney	170 (15)
Total		199 (25)

Representative team honours
Years	Team	Games (Goals)
2008	Dream Team	1 (0)

International team honours
2004	Australia	2
- ^{1} Playing statistics correct to the end of 2011.

Career highlights
- AFL premiership player: 2005; Sydney captain 2008–2010; All-Australian: 2006, 2009; AFLQ premiership player: 2001

Craig Bolton (born 31 May 1980) is a former Australian rules footballer who played for the Brisbane Lions and the Sydney Swans in the Australian Football League (AFL). He often plays at full back or on the half back flank. He is unrelated to former Swans teammate Jude Bolton.

== Playing career ==
Having played for the Eastlake Football Club in Canberra, and the NSW/ACT Under 18s team, Bolton was picked by Brisbane in the 3rd round of the 1998 AFL draft. He was on the Lions' list from 1999 until 2002, making his debut against Carlton in Round 1 of the 2000 season. Being unable to gain a regular place in the very strong Brisbane team of the time forced Bolton to depart the club at the end of the 2002 season, managing only 29 games since his debut.

Bolton was selected by Sydney in the 2003 pre-season draft and was immediately given a starting role in the team. Quickly cementing his place in the side's backline, Bolton missed only one game in his first seven years with the Swans. His first three years with Sydney mirrored his time at Brisbane, with the Swans' making the preliminary finals in 2003, semi-finals in 2004 and the grand final in 2005. As opposed to his emergency listing for the 2001 and 2002 Grand Finals for the Lions, Bolton was now a regular member of the team for Sydney, and as such played a part in the Grand Final victory over West Coast, earning his first premiership medal, as well as finishing third in the club's Best and Fairest Award.

Gradually establishing himself as one of the AFL's standout defenders, Bolton was awarded a place in the 2006 All-Australian team on the half-back flank position, and again in the 2009 team at his preferred position of centre-half back. He also finished third in the Swans' 2007 Best and Fairest Award.

At the beginning of the 2008 season, Bolton was named Swans' co-captain, alongside Brett Kirk and Leo Barry. Later that year Bolton represented the Dream Team Australian rules football team in the Hall of Fame exhibition match at the MCG.

The latter half of his season in 2008 was somewhat restricted by a groin injury. After the Swans exited the finals, he travelled to Germany with teammate Adam Goodes for surgery.

In 2010, Bolton sustained a bad Achilles tendon injury against West Coast at the SCG in Round 5, ruling him out for the year.

On 24 March 2011, Bolton announced his immediate retirement after an ankle injury which would rule him out of the upcoming 2011 AFL season.

=== Media career ===
Following his playing career, Bolton commenced a media career as an Australian Rules Football commentator on ABC Local Radio and also a guest commentator of the sport on the Seven Network.

== Career achievements ==
- International Rules Australian representative 2004
- Premiership player 2005
- 3rd best and fairest 2005, 2007
- 2006 All Australian
- 2008 – 2010 Co-Captain
- 2009 All Australian

== Statistics ==
Legend
G	Goals	K	Kicks	D	Disposals	T	Tackles
B	Behinds	H	Handballs	M	Marks

Season	Team	No.	Games	Totals							Averages (per game)						
Season	Team	No.	Games	G	B	K	H	D	M	T	G	B	K	H	D	M	T
2000	Brisbane Lions	26	15	7	4	120	41	161	54	6	0.5	0.3	8.0	2.7	10.7	3.6	0.4
2001	Brisbane Lions	26	8	3	2	48	33	81	23	8	0.4	0.3	6.0	4.1	10.1	2.9	1.0
2002	Brisbane Lions	26	6	0	1	24	17	41	9	7	0.0	0.2	4.0	2.8	6.8	1.5	1.2
2003	Sydney	6	24	0	0	177	108	285	93	35	0.0	0.0	7.4	4.5	11.9	3.9	1.5
2004	Sydney	6	24	6	0	164	106	270	81	57	0.3	0.0	6.8	4.4	11.3	3.4	2.4
2005	Sydney	6	26	1	3	211	137	348	112	62	0.0	0.1	8.1	5.3	13.4	4.3	2.4
2006	Sydney	6	24	3	4	245	104	349	144	59	0.1	0.2	10.2	4.3	14.5	6.0	2.5
2007	Sydney	6	23	3	2	244	110	354	138	40	0.1	0.1	10.6	4.8	15.4	6.0	1.7
2008	Sydney	6	24	2	1	249	153	402	148	45	0.1	0.0	10.4	6.4	16.8	6.2	1.9
2009	Sydney	6	20	0	0	188	140	328	101	31	0.0	0.0	9.4	7.0	16.4	5.1	1.6
2010	Sydney	6	5	0	0	26	33	59	11	9	0.0	0.0	5.2	6.6	11.8	2.2	1.8
Career			199	25	17	1696	982	2678	914	359	0.1	0.1	8.5	4.9	13.5	4.6	1.8
