= 2005 AFL Grand Final =

Grand final of the 2005 Australian Football League season

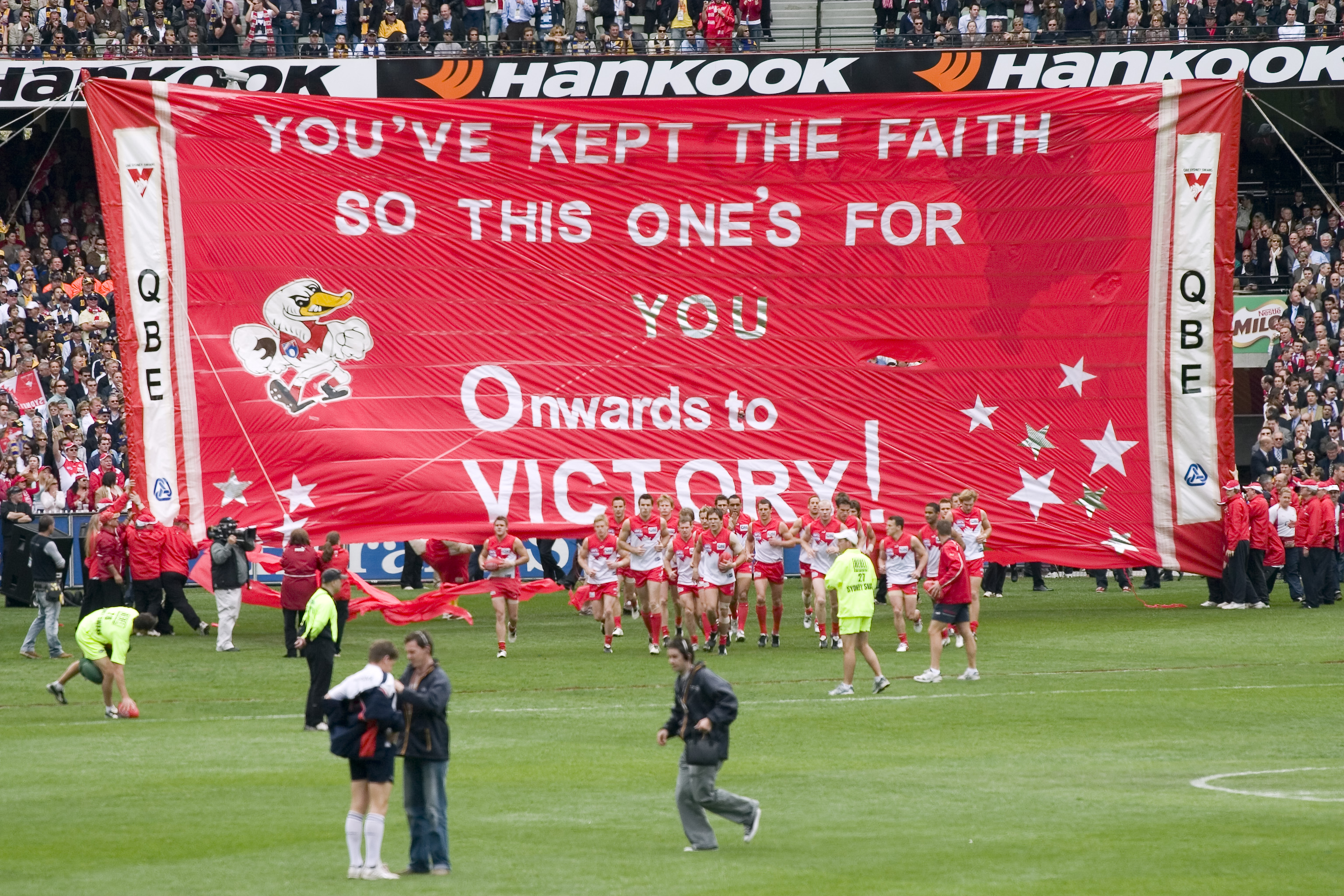
- The Sydney Swans walk onto the field before the game. The Swans would win the game with a 4-point margin, winning their first premiership in 72 years.

Sydney	West Coast
8.10 (58)	7.12 (54)
	1	2	3	4
SYD	3.0 (18)	6.3 (39)	6.5 (41)	8.10 (58)
WCE	2.4 (16)	2.7 (19)	5.9 (39)	7.12 (54)
- Date: 24 September 2005
- Stadium: Melbourne Cricket Ground
- Attendance: 91,828
- Favourite: Sydney
- Umpires: Scott McLaren (11), Brett Allen (10), Darren Goldspink (32)
- Coin toss won by: Sydney
- Kicked toward: City End

Ceremonies
- Pre-match entertainment: Delta Goodrem, Silvie Paladino, Michael Bublé, Dame Edna Everage, Melbourne Gospel Choir and Australian Girls' Choir
- National anthem: Silvie Paladino

Accolades
- Norm Smith Medallist: Chris Judd (West Coast)
- Jock McHale Medallist: Paul Roos

Broadcast in Australia
- Network: Network Ten

The 2005 AFL Grand Final was an Australian rules football game contested between the Sydney Swans and West Coast Eagles at the Melbourne Cricket Ground on 24 September 2005. It was the 109th annual grand final of the Australian Football League (formerly the Victorian Football League), staged to determine the premiers for the 2005 AFL season. The match, attended by 91,828 spectators, was won by Sydney by a margin of four points. It was the club's fourth VFL/AFL premiership, and its first since 1933, breaking a league-record 72-year premiership drought.

As of 2024, the 2005 AFL Grand Final is the highest-rating AFL game of all time since the current OzTam measurement system was introduced in 2001. A total average of 4.449 million people watched the game on TV nationally, including 3.4 million metropolitan viewers. It is one of the most-watched television broadcasts in Australia since 2001, ranked 10th overall as of 2025.

== Background ==
This was West Coast's first appearance in a grand final since winning the 1994 premiership, whilst it was Sydney's first since losing in 1996, and the Swans had not won a premiership since 1933 (as South Melbourne).

Two players from the Eagles' last premiership in 1994 were appearing in this grand final: Drew Banfield for the Eagles and Jason Ball for the Swans in his last AFL game.

At the conclusion of the home-and-away season, West Coast finished second on the AFL ladder behind Adelaide with 17 wins and five losses. Sydney finished third with 15 wins and seven losses. They met in the qualifying final at Subiaco Oval, and West Coast won by four points.

A major turning point in the Swans' season came when they lost to St Kilda at Telstra Dome in round ten, after which Swans coach Paul Roos came under heavy criticism from the entire AFL for his side's game plan.

The Eagles qualified for the grand final by defeating minor premiers Adelaide in their preliminary final by 16 points. Meanwhile, Nick Davis famously rescued Sydney in their semi-final at the SCG against Geelong with four 4th-quarter goals, including one just seconds before the final siren. The Swans then overcame St Kilda in their preliminary final at the MCG after overturning a 7-point deficit going into the last quarter into a 31-point win with seven final quarter goals.

In the week leading up to the grand final, West Coast's Ben Cousins was awarded the Brownlow Medal. There was controversy over the fact that Barry Hall was allowed to play, as he had escaped suspension for punching St Kilda's Matt Maguire in the preliminary final when similar incidents had drawn suspensions during the year. Hall later admitted in 2017 that he exploited a loophole in the rules, saying: "I shouldn’t have played. If rules are rules, I shouldn’t have played the Grand Final."

== Match summary ==
West Coast opened the game shaky, with Sydney be aggressive to get the ball into their forward fifty. However, the West Coast defensive line held strong, only making Sydney kick two goals. The term ended with Sydney leading by 13 points.

In the second quarter Sydney appeared just as strong, kicking three goals. West Coast however, also kicked three goals while kicking accurate. Unfortunately for Sydney they kicked for behinds then goals, kicks four.

Both teams had seemingly easy goals that were missed, but the Eagles most clearly would remember theirs from the fourth quarter. With just under five minutes remaining in the match, West Coast's Brent Staker almost cost his team the match following a 50-metre penalty to the Swans sending them out of their defensive 50 in a very costly play. With the Swans holding a five-point lead in the closing moments, Sydney's Tadhg Kennelly rushed a behind to blunt a ferocious Eagles attack. After the ensuing kick in, West Coast regained control of the ball and sent a long kick back to the half-forward line by Dean Cox. Sydney's Leo Barry responded by taking a mark in the midst of the pack full of Eagles players (with the commentator Stephen Quartermain saying a sequence of words made famous through frequent replays: "Leo Barry, you star!"), denying the Eagles an opportunity to kick a game-winner on or after the final siren, thus ensuring that the Swans would win their first premiership in 72 years (when they were South Melbourne), ending the longest premiership drought in VFL/AFL history.

The match has been labelled as a 'classic', with the final margin being the closest since the 1977 drawn grand final. This was the first time since the 1989 VFL Grand Final that the grand final was decided by a goal or less.

Eagles player Chris Judd was awarded the Norm Smith Medal for being judged the best player afield, although he finished on the losing side; this is one of only five instances of a Grand Final player having won a Norm Smith Medal without being on the winning premiership team.

The same teams met again in the 2006 AFL Grand Final, in another close match, with the Eagles emerging victors by one point.

== Norm Smith Medal ==
Norm Smith Medal voting tally
Position	Player	Club	Total votes	Vote summary
1st (winner)	Chris Judd	West Coast Eagles	11	2,3,3,1,2
2nd	Nic Fosdike	Sydney Swans	6	0,0,0,3,3
3rd	Brett Kirk	Sydney Swans	4	0,2,2,0,0
3rd	Amon Buchanan	Sydney Swans	4	3,0,0,0,1
5th	Ben Cousins	West Coast Eagles	2	0,0,0,2,0
6th	David Wirrpanda	West Coast Eagles	1	0,0,1,0,0
6th	Leo Barry	Sydney Swans	1	0,1,0,0,0
6th	Lewis Roberts-Thomson	Sydney Swans	1	1,0,0,0,0

Voter	Role	3 Votes	2 Votes	1 Vote
Graeme Bond	3AW	Amon Buchanan	Chris Judd	Lewis Roberts-Thomson
David Reed	West Australian	Chris Judd	Brett Kirk	Leo Barry
Mark Robinson	Herald Sun	Chris Judd	Brett Kirk	David Wirrpunda
Michaelangelo Rucci	Adelaide Advertiser	Nic Fosdike	Ben Cousins	Chris Judd
Stephen Quartermain	Network 10	Nic Fosdike	Chris Judd	Amon Buchanan

== Teams ==
Sydney Swans	West Coast Eagles

Sydney
B:	28 Jared Crouch	21 Leo Barry	30 Lewis Roberts-Thomson
HB:	4 Ben Mathews	6 Craig Bolton	17 Tadhg Kennelly
C:	26 Sean Dempster	37 Adam Goodes	32 Amon Buchanan
HF:	5 Ryan O'Keefe	1 Barry Hall (c)	24 Jude Bolton
F:	10 Paul Williams	19 Michael O'Loughlin	2 Nick Davis
Foll:	16 Darren Jolly	31 Brett Kirk	20 Luke Ablett
Int:	27 Jason Ball	42 Paul Bevan	13 Adam Schneider
Int:	12 Nic Fosdike		
Coach:	Paul Roos		

West Coast
B:	39 Adam Hunter	23 Darren Glass	44 David Wirrpanda
HB:	17 Daniel Chick	11 Travis Gaspar	6 Drew Banfield
C:	5 Tyson Stenglein	9 Ben Cousins (c)	32 Andrew Embley
HF:	4 Daniel Kerr	29 Ashley Hansen	41 Brent Staker
F:	35 Kasey Green	1 Michael Gardiner	28 Ashley Sampi
Foll:	20 Dean Cox	3 Chris Judd	7 Chad Fletcher
Int:	37 Adam Selwood	31 Mark Nicoski	26 Sam Butler
Int:	14 Mark Seaby		
Coach:	John Worsfold		

== Scorecard ==
Grand final
Saturday, 24 September (2:35 pm)	Sydney	def.	West Coast	MCG (crowd: 91,898)
3.0 (18); 6.3 (39); 6.5 (41); 8.10 (58)	Q1; Q2; Q3; Final	2.4 (16); 2.7 (19); 5.9 (39); 7.12 (54)	Umpires: Allen, McLaren, Goldspink; Norm Smith Medal: Chris Judd (West Coast); Television broadcast: Network Ten; National anthem: Silvie Paladino
Hall 2 Jolly, Schneider, O'Loughlin, Kennelly, Goodes, Buchanan 1	Goals	2 Hunter; 1 Nicoski, Cox, Embley, Hansen, Cousins
Roberts-Thomson, Goodes, Buchanan, Kennelly, Fosdike, Kirk	Best	Judd, Wirrpunda, Cousins, Cox, Fletcher
Ball (cut head), C. Bolton (nose), Crouch (ankle)	Injuries	Kerr (ankle), Gardiner (cut head)
Nil	Reports	Nil
Sydney won its fourth premiership, and its first since relocating to Sydney from South Melbourne. The club's last premiership as South Melbourne was in 1933, and as of 2024 its 72-year premiership drought is the longest in VFL/AFL history.; Tadhg Kennelly became the first Irishman to become an AFL premiership player. Later in 2009, Kennelly became the first man to be both an AFL premiership player and an All-Ireland Senior Football Championship winner, achieving this with his native Kerry.; Chris Judd became the fourth player to win the Norm Smith Medal despite being on the grand final losing team, joining Maurice Rioli (Richmond 1982), Gary Ablett Sr. (Geelong 1989) and Nathan Buckley (Collingwood 2002).; Only 112 points were scored in total, making this the lowest-scoring grand final since 1968.

== Match statistics ==
Team stats	(Syd)	(WCE)
Kicks	188	182
Marks	84	68
Handballs	105	104
Tackles	62	59
Hitouts	29	43
Frees	12	13

== Entertainment ==
National Anthem	Silvie Paladino
Entertainment	Delta Goodrem (I Am Australian); Australian Idol finalists (Waltzing Matilda); Silvie Paladino (There You'll Be); Michael Bublé; Dame Edna Everage; Melbourne Gospel Choir; Australian Girls' Choir
Television broadcaster	Network Ten
Television announcers	Stephen Quartermain, Tim Lane — play-by-play Robert Walls, Stephen Silvagni — analysts Christi Malthouse — sideline reporter Anthony Hudson — studio host Leigh Matthews, Malcolm Blight — studio analysts

== See also ==
- 2005 AFL finals series
- 2005 AFL season
