= Jude Bolton =

Australian rules footballer, born 1980

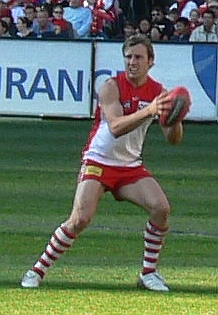

Personal information
- Full name: Jude Bolton
- Born: 15 March 1980 (age 46)
- Original teams: St.Bernards OCFC, Calder Cannons (TAC Cup)
- Draft: 1. 8, 1998 National Draft, Sydney
- Height: 182 cm (6 ft 0 in)
- Weight: 84 kg (185 lb)
- Position: Midfielder

Playing career^{1}
Years	Club	Games (Goals)
1999–2013	Sydney	325 (196)

International team honours
Years	Team	Games (Goals)
2004	Australia	2 (0)
- ^{1} Playing statistics correct to the end of 2013.

Career highlights
- 2× AFL premiership player: 2005, 2012; Madden Medal 2013

Jude Bolton (born 15 March 1980) is a former professional Australian rules football player who played for the Sydney Swans in the Australian Football League (AFL) between 1999 and 2013.

== Early life ==
Growing up, he supported the St Kilda Football Club. He was recruited from and played his junior football at St Bernard's Football Club in Essendon.

== AFL career ==
Bolton played his first senior game for Sydney against Carlton in round 12 of the 1999 season and received a Rising Star Award nomination the following year. By 2001, he was a regular member of the team and went on to represent Australia in the International Rules series in 2004.

On Saturday, 9 April 2011, Bolton laid an AFL-record 19 tackles in a match, playing an integral role in victory over the West Coast Eagles. In the Second Semi-final, he set the new record for the most tackles lain in a VFL/AFL career, surpassing former captain Brett Kirk's tally of 1,278 career tackles. His final career total was 1490 tackles, which was the record until surpassed by Lenny Hayes late in 2014.

On 26 August 2013, Bolton announced he would retire at the conclusion of the 2013 season. He played his last game in Sydney's preliminary final loss to Fremantle on 21 September and scored his final goal for the Swans.

== After football ==
In December 2013, Bolton was a crew member aboard racing super maxi yacht Perpetual Loyal in the 2013 Sydney to Hobart Yacht Race, with other celebrity crew members, Karl Stefanovic, Larry Emdur, Tom Slingsby, Phil Waugh and Guillaume Brahimi.

He is currently seen as a boundary rider for the Seven Network's coverage of AFL matches played in Sydney.

He appeared as a contestant on the fifteenth season of Dancing with the Stars paired with professional dancer Dianne Buswell. Jude's wife, Lynette, competed against Jude. On 16 August 2015, Jude and Dianne were eliminated, coming in seventh place, and Jude was eliminated one week after Lynette.

== Personal life ==
His wife, Lynette Bolton, starred in WAG Nation, a reality show that documented the lives of five wives and girlfriends of Australian sportsmen. Bolton has two daughters. Jude was inducted into the St. Bernards College Hall of Fame in 2017.

== Statistics ==
Legend
G	Goals	K	Kicks	D	Disposals	T	Tackles
B	Behinds	H	Handballs	M	Marks

Season	Team	No.	Games	Totals							Averages (per game)						
Season	Team	No.	Games	G	B	K	H	D	M	T	G	B	K	H	D	M	T
1999	Sydney	24	9	3	1	64	43	107	17	13	0.3	0.1	7.1	4.8	11.9	1.9	1.4
2000	Sydney	24	16	15	3	126	73	199	36	27	0.9	0.2	7.9	4.6	12.4	2.3	1.7
2001	Sydney	24	23	14	7	199	122	321	72	46	0.6	0.3	8.7	5.3	14.0	3.1	2.0
2002	Sydney	24	19	9	9	139	124	263	58	67	0.5	0.5	7.3	6.5	13.8	3.1	3.5
2003	Sydney	24	24	13	6	266	212	478	104	76	0.5	0.3	11.1	8.8	19.9	4.3	3.2
2004	Sydney	24	24	12	7	280	211	491	83	102	0.5	0.3	11.7	8.8	20.5	3.5	4.3
2005	Sydney	24	24	3	5	270	182	452	80	122	0.1	0.2	11.3	7.6	18.8	3.3	5.1
2006	Sydney	24	25	12	7	308	160	468	77	134	0.5	0.3	12.3	6.4	18.7	3.1	5.4
2007	Sydney	24	23	6	10	214	198	412	66	105	0.3	0.4	9.3	8.6	17.9	2.9	4.6
2008	Sydney	24	24	11	5	244	231	475	84	143	0.5	0.2	10.2	9.6	19.8	3.5	6.0
2009	Sydney	24	22	12	8	228	243	471	69	155	0.5	0.4	10.4	11.0	21.4	3.1	7.0
2010	Sydney	24	24	15	7	196	303	499	67	138	0.6	0.3	8.2	12.6	20.8	2.8	5.8
2011	Sydney	24	22	19	12	230	199	429	53	154	0.9	0.5	10.5	9.0	19.5	2.4	7.0
2012	Sydney	24	22	23	10	183	253	436	70	117	1.0	0.5	8.3	11.5	19.8	3.2	5.3
2013	Sydney	24	24	29	17	166	164	330	69	91	1.2	0.7	6.9	6.8	13.8	2.9	3.8
Career			325	196	114	3113	2718	5831	1005	1490	0.6	0.4	9.6	8.4	17.9	3.1	4.6
