= Fraser Gehrig =

Australian rules footballer, born 1976

Personal information
- Full name: Fraser Gehrig
- Nickname: G-Train
- Born: 3 March 1976 (age 50)
- Original team: Murray Bushrangers (TAC Cup)
- Draft: No. 16, 1993 National draft, West Coast; No. 57, 2007 National draft, St Kilda
- Height: 195 cm (6 ft 5 in)
- Weight: 109 kg (240 lb)
- Position: Forward

Playing career^{1}
Years	Club	Games (Goals)
1995–2000	West Coast	115 (159)
2001–2008	St Kilda	145 (390)
Total		260 (549)
- ^{1} Playing statistics correct to the end of 2008.

Career highlights
- All-Australian team 1997, 2004; West Coast leading goalkicker 1998; St Kilda 5x leading goalkicker 2003–2007; Coleman Medal 2004, 2005; Trevor Barker Award runner-up 2001; Pre-season premiership 2004; AFL Rising Star nominee: 1995

Fraser Gehrig (born 3 March 1976) is a retired Australian rules footballer who played for the St Kilda Football Club and the West Coast Eagles in the Australian Football League (AFL).

Gehrig was a versatile player during his AFL career, beginning his career at West Coast before becoming known as a powerful goal kicker and Coleman Medalist at St Kilda.

Gehrig holds the bench press record at both West Coast and St Kilda as well as being the best bench press performer in the AFL, with many additionally regarding him as the strongest and most intimidating player in the AFL. While in the peak of his career, he was also widely regarded as the fastest player over 30 metres in any ball sport.

== Early life ==
Gehrig grew up in Wodonga, Victoria, and attended high school at Catholic College Wodonga. Gehrig held the school's athletics record in the 100-metre sprint for more than 20 years.

== Career ==
=== West Coast ===
Gehrig began his AFL career at the West Coast Eagles playing as a utility and on the wing. He was known for his strength and versatility.

Gehrig struggled to break into a powerful Eagles lineup during his first few years at the Western Australian club, but he stepped up in 1997 and won selection in the All-Australian team in a forward pocket.

Gehrig had a season on the half-forward line in 1998, but he struggled with injury and form over the following two years and was traded to St Kilda at the end of the 2000 season. West Coast received David Sierakowski and 2000 AFL draft selection number 18 (Daniel Kerr) from St Kilda in exchange for Gehrig.

=== St Kilda ===
Gehrig made his debut with the Saints in 2001. After initially playing at full-back in his first year at his new club, Gehrig finished second in the St Kilda best and fairest award. He switched to the full-forward position in 2003, and this move coincided with St Kilda's rise up the ladder, finishing 11th in 2003 and playing in finals matches in 2004, 2005 and 2006.

Gehrig became a powerful and dominant force in the goalsquare and weighed in at 109 kilograms. He quickly became a prolific goalkicker, booting 55 goals in 2003 and 103 in 2004. A large pitch invasion by fans occurred following his 100th goal, a typical occurrence for feats of this nature. Gehrig won back-to-back Coleman Medals in 2004 and 2005 and was named at full-forward in the All-Australian team in 2004.

Gehrig's unique style of play earned him the nicknames "G-Train" for his locomotive-like leads and strong marking. He twice kicked 10 goals in a match during his AFL career: once against Richmond and again against the Kangaroos.

Gehrig was close to retirement at the end of the 2003 season, but coach Grant Thomas managed to convince him to play on.

Gehrig played his 200th game in 2005, kicking seven goals against opponent Leo Barry, to help St Kilda to a 43-point win over Sydney. He kicked a total of 36 goals playing against Sydney.

Gehrig signed a one-year deal at the end of the 2006 season and was again a prolific goal-kicker for the Saints, booting 59 goals from 20 matches.

Gehrig's 250th game came against Carlton in round 17, 2007. Again, the Saints emerged victorious.

=== Temporary retirement ===
Immediately before St Kilda's last game of the 2007 season, on 1 September, Gehrig announced his retirement to the team. Unusually, he waved to the dedicated fans in the cheer squad when he came on the field, and then played well in a tight contest against Richmond. In the dying seconds of the match, Gehrig took a strong mark in St Kilda's forward line and kicked his 540th career goal, one of five that day, to secure the win. Gehrig was chaired off the ground by St Kilda players Nick Riewoldt and Justin Koschitzke, bare-chested after giving his famous number-nine jumper to a young female fan in the stands.

=== Comeback ===
Three months later Gehrig shocked many by changing his mind and deciding that he wished to continue playing with St Kilda. Having already been removed from St Kilda's playing list, Gehrig was forced to return via one of the AFL drafts and opted for the national draft over the pre-season draft. This option forced Gehrig onto the standard two-year draftees' contract, but allowed the club to redraft him without using an early pre-season draft selection. St Kilda re-drafted Gehrig with its fourth-round selection (#57 overall).

After a few lacklustre games, many feared that Gehrig had lost his form and fitness and he was dropped to the reserves. In a last-ditch effort to kickstart his playing career, the coach selected him in the senior list, but he failed to have any impact. Gehrig revealed that he was suffering from painful arthritis, which affected his game and required surgery. St Kilda then put him on its long-term injury list. This move onto the long-term injury list, instead of retirement, meant that St Kilda were able to elevate Robert Eddy from the rookie list. Gehrig's subsequent return to the senior list was a precaution in case of injury to other players, though he did not play for the remainder of the season.

== Statistics ==
Legend
G	Goals	K	Kicks	D	Disposals	T	Tackles
B	Behinds	H	Handballs	M	Marks

Led the league for the season only
Led the league after finals only
Led the league after season and finals

Season	Team	No.	Games	Totals							Averages (per game)						
Season	Team	No.	Games	G	B	K	H	D	M	T	G	B	K	H	D	M	T
1995	West Coast	25	16	21	4	119	51	170	73	11	1.3	0.3	7.4	3.2	10.6	4.6	0.7
1996	West Coast	7	24	12	8	183	117	300	99	22	0.5	0.3	7.6	4.9	12.5	4.1	0.9
1997	West Coast	7	22	31	17	223	80	303	115	21	1.4	0.8	10.1	3.6	13.8	5.2	1.0
1998	West Coast	7	23	42	19	200	92	292	144	18	1.8	0.8	8.7	4.0	12.7	6.3	0.8
1999	West Coast	7	11	19	9	85	46	131	61	8	1.7	0.8	7.7	4.2	11.9	5.5	0.7
2000	West Coast	7	19	34	17	164	77	241	108	15	1.8	0.9	8.6	4.1	12.7	5.7	0.8
2001	St Kilda	9	20	3	5	173	83	256	97	16	0.2	0.3	8.7	4.2	12.8	4.9	0.8
2002	St Kilda	9	12	12	9	81	64	145	60	9	1.0	0.8	6.8	5.3	12.1	5.0	0.8
2003	St Kilda	9	21	55	34	190	62	252	129	22	2.6	1.6	9.0	3.0	12.0	6.1	1.0
2004	St Kilda	9	23	103	39	184	54	238	131	18	4.5	1.7	8.0	2.3	10.3	5.7	0.8
2005	St Kilda	9	22	78	49	177	41	218	114	12	3.5	2.2	8.0	1.9	9.9	5.2	0.5
2006	St Kilda	9	22	71	37	173	39	212	123	12	3.2	1.7	7.9	1.8	9.6	5.6	0.5
2007	St Kilda	9	20	59	35	173	34	207	110	14	3.0	1.8	8.7	1.7	10.4	5.5	0.7
2008	St Kilda	9	5	9	3	25	7	32	18	1	1.8	0.6	5.0	1.4	6.4	3.6	0.2
Career			260	549	285	2150	847	2997	1382	199	2.1	1.1	8.3	3.3	11.5	5.3	0.8

== Career highlights ==
- AFL Rising Star nominee, 1995
- All-Australian 1997, 2004
- West Coast leading goalkicker, 1998
- 2nd in St Kilda Best and Fairest, 2001
- St Kilda leading goalkicker, 2003–2007
- St Kilda's 2004 Wizard Home Loans Cup–winning side, 2004
- Coleman Medalist 2004, 2005

== Controversies ==
Gehrig was involved in some off-field indiscretions during his time with both St Kilda and West Coast. It was alleged that Gehrig urinated on a patron at a nightclub, although no formal accusations were made.

Gehrig was also charged with the unlawful assault of a woman in an alleged incident during Grand Final week in 2006. Gehrig, with Steven Lawrence and former Brisbane Lions captain Michael Voss, were all charged over a fight in a St Kilda hotel.

Some of Gehrig's on-field incidents earned him penalties, with suspensions mainly for striking incidents against opposition players (once in 2003, twice in 2004, once in 2005 and once in 2007). As well as this, in the "Sirengate" match in 2006, Gehrig conceded five consecutive free kicks whilst scuffling with Fremantle's defenders, three of which were converted into 50-metre penalties, which led to his direct opponent, Michael Johnson, walking the length of the field to give Fremantle a 33-point lead. Gehrig was benched after the indiscretions, but it also appeared to be the turning point in the match, and St Kilda eventually only lost by one point in controversial circumstances.
