= Catholic College Wodonga =

Coordinates: 36.12989°S 146.86179°E

Information
- Motto: Life in Jesus
- Religious affiliation: Catholic
- Established: 1979
- Principal: Lorraine Willis (2022–present)
- Years: 7–12
- Enrollment: 1220+
- Campuses: Main Campus - Nganala (Religion campus )
- Website: https://ccw.vic.edu.au/

Catholic College Wodonga is a co-educational Catholic school in Wodonga, Victoria, Australia, catering for students from Years 7 through to 12.

Founded by the Wodonga Catholic Parish in 1979, the College's aim is to find "Life in Jesus" and to continue the work of the Sisters of Mercy in educating young people for a range of pathways in life. Catholic College Wodonga is part of Catholic Education Wodonga (CEW), a division of Catholic Education Sandhurst.

Because of this association students are often streamed from the three Catholic primary schools which make up the rest of CEW. These feeder schools are St. Monica's Primary School, St. Augustine's Primary School and St Francis of Assisi Primary School.

== History ==
In 1876 a co-educational primary school was built on the corner of High Street and Osburn Street. In 1892, four teachers from the Sisters of Mercy from Albury began the foundation of a new educational institution in Wodonga, which was completed in 1899 and became St. Augustine's Primary school. The school continued until 1982 under the name St Augustine's. In the meanwhile, female students from out-lying areas boarded at the convent.

In the 1970s, Albury-Wodonga was declared a National Growth Centre and by 1979 an increased number of students lead to the St Augustine’s Girls Secondary College being relocated to the Wodonga West location under the new name of "Catholic College Wodonga"

In 2019, the college celebrated its 40th anniversary.

In 2024, the college was subject to numerous scandals.

== Controversies ==
=== Sexual harassment ===
In May 2024, Catholic College became involved in a scandal following the emergence of an alleged private Snapchat group created by Year 12 male students. This group was suspected of containing comments about the physical appearance of their female peers.

The school "conducted an investigation" after learning about the incident. The school's principal, Lorraine Willies, stated that the school "enacted the relevant policies and procedures" and reiterated the expectations of respectful relationships to the Year 12 male students involved. The parent of one of the female students affected by the comments reported that their daughter was "pretty devastated." The parent also said the behaviour was being "swept under the carpet" and described it as "vile". No individual punishment was given to the boys involved, and counselling was not offered to the female students who were targeted.

This incident occurred shortly after a similar event at Yarra Valley Grammar, another school in Melbourne, where Year 12 male students created a spreadsheet assessing female classmates' attractiveness. Two students from Yarra Valley Grammar were expelled due to this incident.

Victorian Premier Jacinta Allan described the incident at Catholic College Wodonga as "distressing".

In May 2024, Catholic College Wodonga faced controversy when a student was suspended for using the term "sigma" in conversation. Despite the term's common usage as internet slang for "lone wolf" or introvert, school authorities deemed it inappropriate as the student was using it to assert dominance over female staff members as a way to refuse instructions. The student's mother's boyfriend expressed astonishment at the severity of the punishment, questioning the rationale behind penalising his girlfriend's son for using what they considered innocuous language. The incident received some negative backlash from students and parents who didn't fully realise the dangers of online influencers who encourage insecure young males to exert their masculinity by refusing to treat females with respect. In a local newspaper article, qualified counsellors and psychologists supported the school's stance, reinforcing the danger and harm that can come from online influencers whose target audience is young and impressionable males. Many parents offered support and gratitude for the school's strong insistence on respect and politeness to all.

== CEW theme ==
Each year the College is given a theme to have the students aim to follow and be alike. From 2014, Catholic Education Wodonga (CEW) decided to use the theme across all four of the Catholic Schools in Wodonga.

Year	CEW Theme
2012	"We are gods work of art. Called to share our gifts."
2013	"Be the seed that nourishes our world"
2014	"You are the Light of the World, Let Your Light Shine."
2015	"The Time is Now, Make God's Kingdom Real"
2016	"Walk with the Lord: forgive, show mercy, give joyfully, extend hospitality, do not judge and show compassion."
2017	"Be Courageous! God is with You"
2018	"Serve God by Serving Others - With Joy, With Compassion, With Peace"
2019	"Rise Up and Pray"
2020	"Listen to what the Spirit is saying"
2021	"Faith in Our Future"
2022	"Tell the Good News"

== Teaching and learning ==
Catholic College is divided into six Learning Communities or Houses; Hollows (yellow), Malone (green), da Vinci (blue), Chisholm (red), Gandhi (orange) and MacKillop (purple). Each with their own given LCL (Learning Community Leader).

Beginning the day, students start the day in their home bases or better known as Learning Mentor Groups (LMs). LMs contain students from a single community and across a variety of years of approximately 28 students. The objective of LMs is to encourage friendships across year levels and announce relevant school news. Each LM is co-ordinated by two, or in some cases three, teachers who is the primary contact for students in their group regarding school or administrative issues. They also provide the students with academical references.

In October 2018, the new Aquinas Centre (Science) was opened for use by students and staff.

== Notable alumni ==
- Fraser Gehrig – AFL footballer
- Ben McEvoy – AFL footballer
- Ben Paton – AFL footballer
