= Darren Jolly =

Australian rules footballer (born 1981)

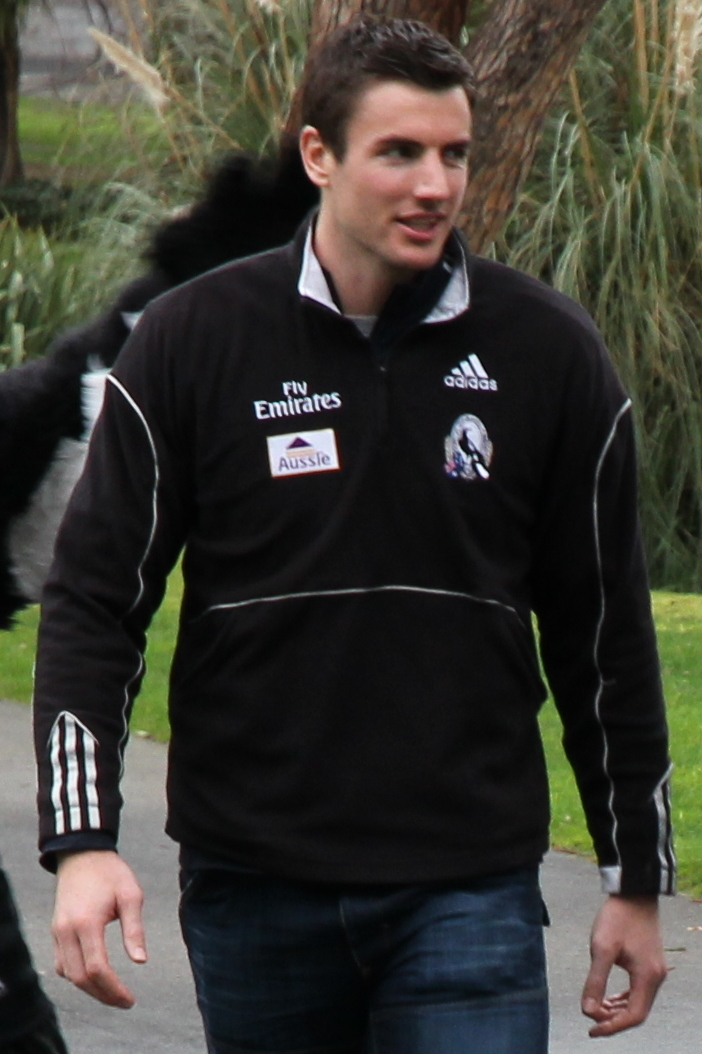
- Jolly with Collingwood in 2010

Personal information
- Born: 6 November 1981 (age 44)
- Original team: North Ballarat (VFL)
- Draft: No. 31, 2001 Rookie Draft
- Height: 200 cm (6 ft 7 in)
- Weight: 108 kg (238 lb)
- Position: Ruckman

Playing career^{1}
Years	Club	Games (Goals)
2001–2004	Melbourne	48 (11)
2005–2009	Sydney	118 (59)
2010–2013	Collingwood	71 (52)
Total		237 (122)
- ^{1} Playing statistics correct to the end of 2013.

Career highlights
- Sydney premiership player 2005; Collingwood premiership player 2010

Darren Jolly (born 6 November 1981) is a former professional Australian rules footballer who played for the Melbourne Football Club, the Sydney Swans and the Collingwood Football Club in the Australian Football League (AFL). He is best known for being the ruckman in Sydney's 2005 premiership win and also Collingwood's 2010 premiership win.

== Junior career ==
After completing his schooling at Damascus College Ballarat in 1996, and playing for the North Ballarat Rebels in the TAC Cup, Jolly spent a year playing for the North Ballarat Football Club in the Victorian Football League (VFL) before being drafted by the Melbourne Football Club in the 2001 Rookie Draft.

== Melbourne ==
He played 48 games over four seasons for Melbourne, mainly as an understudy to Jeff White.

== Sydney ==
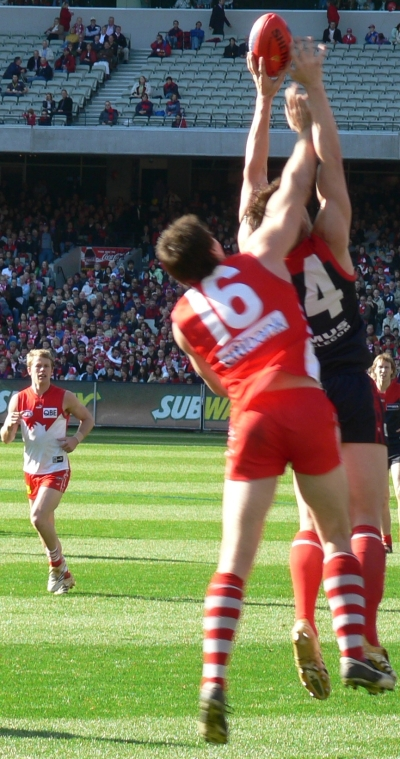
Jolly attempts a spoil while playing for Sydney in 2006.

The Demons traded Jolly to Sydney in 2004 for pick 15 in that year's national draft. Along with Jason Ball, in 2005 he was an integral part of Sydney's ruck division and after the retirement of Ball, assumed the number one ruck role at Sydney.

During his time at the Swans Jolly only missed two games, stemming from a suspension following an incident against his old club Melbourne. This run was cut in early 2011 due to an injury suffered playing for Collingwood.

In the early hours of 29 September – one day before the Swans played in the 2006 AFL Grand Final – Jolly's wife Deanne gave birth to the couple's first child, Scarlett, which brought relief to coach Paul Roos.

== Collingwood ==
At the end of the 2009 season, Jolly requested a trade be done so he could return to his native Victoria with his family. Collingwood securing a trade in exchange for picks number 14 and 46 in the 2009 AFL draft. Jolly became Collingwood's number one ruckman, and in 2010 was named in the 40-man All-Australian team squad, but did not make the final team.

Jolly's first two seasons at Collingwood mirrored his first two seasons with the Swans: he was part of Collingwood's premiership team in 2010, then part of its losing Grand Final team in 2011. Jolly played his 200th AFL game in round 19, 2011.

He was delisted by Collingwood at the conclusion of the 2013 AFL season.

== Personal life ==
Jolly and ex-wife Deanne have two daughters. After being delisted by the Magpies, Darren and Dea competed in the ninth season of The Block, a reality television series that follows couples as they compete to renovate a house. They returned for the tenth season of The Block in 2015, and ultimately won the 2015 series. They have since separated.

== Statistics ==
Legend
G	Goals	K	Kicks	D	Disposals	T	Tackles
B	Behinds	H	Handballs	M	Marks	H/O	Hit-outs

Season	Team	No.	Games	Totals								Averages (per game)							
Season	Team	No.	Games	G	B	K	H	D	M	T	H/O	G	B	K	H	D	M	T	H/O
2001	Melbourne	41	4	0	1	5	5	10	2	2	14	0.0	0.3	1.3	1.3	2.6	0.5	0.5	3.5
2002	Melbourne	11	18	7	1	46	39	85	27	16	100	0.4	0.1	2.6	2.2	4.7	1.5	0.9	5.6
2003	Melbourne	11	19	4	0	72	66	138	47	24	260	0.2	0.0	3.8	3.5	7.3	2.5	1.3	13.7
2004	Melbourne	11	7	0	0	16	8	24	11	5	44	0.0	0.0	2.3	1.1	3.4	1.6	0.7	6.3
2005	Sydney	16	24	10	4	110	75	185	64	42	442	0.4	0.2	4.6	3.1	7.7	2.7	1.8	18.4
2006	Sydney	16	25	2	5	141	68	209	55	46	605	0.1	0.2	5.6	2.7	8.4	2.2	1.8	24.2
2007	Sydney	16	23	16	7	162	65	227	95	46	458	0.7	0.3	7.0	2.8	9.9	4.1	2.0	19.9
2008	Sydney	16	24	15	11	160	111	271	105	47	543	0.6	0.5	6.7	4.6	11.3	4.4	2.0	22.6
2009	Sydney	16	22	16	12	134	127	261	92	61	682	0.7	0.5	6.1	5.8	11.9	4.2	2.8	31.0
2010	Collingwood	18	26	24	10	172	155	327	131	58	579	0.9	0.4	6.6	6.0	12.6	5.0	2.2	22.3
2011	Collingwood	18	16	12	4	74	100	174	51	60	383	0.8	0.3	4.6	6.3	10.9	3.2	3.8	23.9
2012	Collingwood	18	20	12	4	94	124	218	58	72	649	0.6	0.2	4.7	6.2	10.9	2.9	3.6	32.5
2013	Collingwood	18	9	4	4	48	58	106	40	32	209	0.4	0.4	5.3	6.4	11.8	4.4	3.6	23.2
Career			237	122	63	1234	1001	2235	778	511	4968	0.5	0.3	5.2	4.2	9.4	3.3	2.2	21.0
