= Adam Schneider =

Australian rules footballer (born 1984)

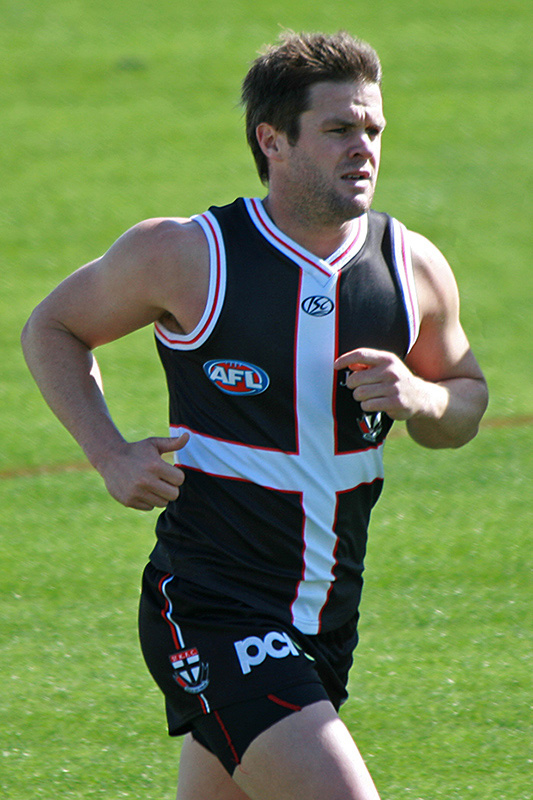

Personal information
- Born: 12 May 1984 (age 42); Wagga Wagga, New South Wales
- Original teams: Osborne (Hume Football League); NSW/ACT Rams (TAC Cup)
- Draft: #60, 2001 National Draft, Sydney
- Height: 175 cm (5 ft 9 in)
- Weight: 78 kg (172 lb)
- Position: Forward

Playing career^{1}
Years	Club	Games (Goals)
2003–2007	Sydney	98 (99)
2008–2015	St Kilda	130 (160)
Total		228 (259)

International team honours^{2}
Years	Team	Games (Goals)
2006	Australia	2 (0)
- ^{1} Playing statistics correct to the end of 2015.^{2} Representative statistics correct as of 2013.

Career highlights
- Sydney premiership player 2005; 2003 AFL Rising Star nominee; Pre-Season Premiership 2008

Adam Schneider (born 12 May 1984) is a former professional Australian rules footballer who played for the Sydney Swans and St Kilda Football Club in the Australian Football League (AFL).

He is currently the senior coach of the Lavington Panthers in the Ovens and Murray Football Netball League

== Overview ==
Originally from the small town of Osborne, Schneider spent most of his teenage years at St Francis de Sales Regional College in Leeton before attending Kooringal High School and Trinity Senior High School in Wagga Wagga where he decided to pursue Australian rules football after also excelling in cricket.

== AFL career ==
=== Sydney Swans ===
Schneider was recruited from Osborne and NSW/ACT Rams by Sydney in the 2001 AFL draft. He was Sydney's 4th Round selection and number 60 overall.

During his first season at the club, Schneider suffered minor injuries and illness which sidelined him for over three months.

However, in 2003, Schneider hit the ground running. Through the pre-season and practice matches he was in great form and earned his senior AFL debut. He debuted in round 1 of the 2003 premiership season against Carlton. His form was good enough for him to hold his place in the seniors for all 24 matches as well as kicking 30 goals for the season. He was awarded the AFL Rising Star nomination in round 5 and finished fifth in the voting for that season's award.

2004, however, was a completely different story. Schneider suffered a hamstring injury which saw the young goal sneak sidelined for a month. He managed to be selected for just 12 matches, half as many as the previous season and managed to kick only nine goals.

In the 2005 season, Schneider gradually improved and towards the second half of the season he was again a regular starter. He went on to play for the Swans in the grand final and scored Sydney's second goal of the match, and was an important and variable player.

He was traded to St Kilda in 2007.

=== St Kilda ===
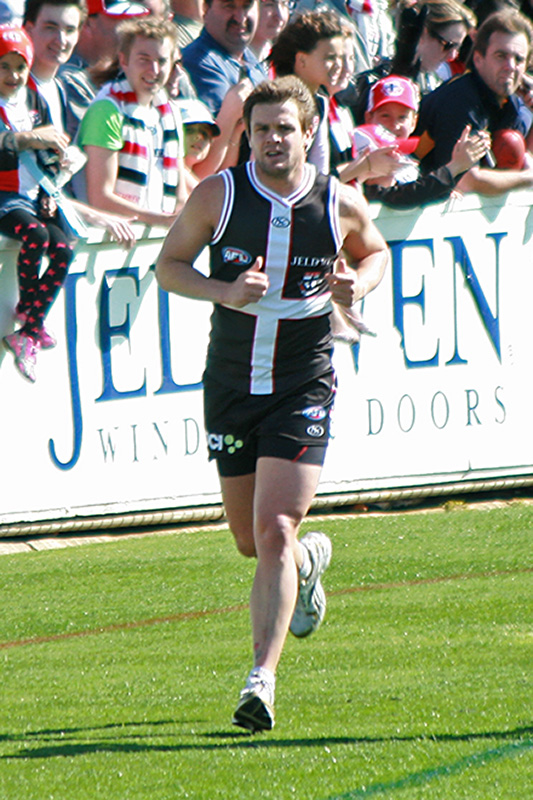
Schneider at training prior to the 2009 AFL Grand Final

Schneider was recruited by St Kilda from Sydney in a trade in exchange for the number 26 draft pick in the 2007 AFL Draft in a deal that also included Sean Dempster moving to the Saints. As at Sydney, Schneider wore the No. 13 guernsey for the Saints.

Schneider played in St Kilda's 2008 NAB Cup winning side, the club's third pre-season cup win. He then made his premiership debut for the Saints against his old side Sydney, kicking a goal in a two-point victory.

Schneider played in 21 of 22 matches in the 2009 AFL season in which St Kilda qualified in first position for the finals, winning the club's third minor premiership.

St Kilda qualified for the 2009 AFL Grand Final after qualifying and preliminary finals wins. Schneider played in the grand final in which St Kilda were defeated by 12 points, denying him a second premiership out of three grand final appearances as he had lost a grand final with Sydney in 2006 against West Coast when the Swans lost by one point.

Schneider played in 25 games in 2010, including four finals matches, and kicked 39 goals.

As of the end of the 2010 season, Schneider had played in 22 finals series matches including five grand finals. Following the Grand Final replay, Schneider was suspended for the first two matches of the 2011 season for an incident involving Collingwood's Brent Macaffer in the third quarter.

Schneider was de-listed at the conclusion of the 2014 season, and then re-drafted by St Kilda as a mature age rookie for the 2015 AFL season. He played one further season, and retired at the end of 2015 after 228 games, following St Kilda's round 22 home game against his old club, the Sydney Swans.

== Post-AFL career ==
After leaving the AFL, Schneider won a VAFA Premier B premiership with Beaumaris in 2016.

Adam represented Australia at the 2016 Kabbadi World Cup.

Head Coach of GWS Giants in the NEAFL (2019).

Assistant Coach of GWS Giants in the AFL (2020-2021).

Head Coach of The Lavington Panthers Football Club (2022-)

== Statistics ==
Legend
G	Goals	K	Kicks	D	Disposals	T	Tackles
B	Behinds	H	Handballs	M	Marks

Season	Team	No.	Games	Totals							Averages (per game)							Votes
Season	Team	No.	Games	G	B	K	H	D	M	T	G	B	K	H	D	M	T	Votes
2003	Sydney	36	24	30	23	187	75	262	94	38	1.3	1.0	7.8	3.1	10.9	3.9	1.6	1
2004	Sydney	13	12	9	10	71	30	101	28	24	0.8	0.8	5.9	2.5	8.4	2.3	2.0	0
2005	Sydney	13	16	11	10	118	56	174	42	32	0.7	0.6	7.4	3.5	10.9	2.6	2.0	0
2006	Sydney	13	25	22	19	244	116	360	78	74	0.9	0.8	9.8	4.6	14.4	3.1	3.0	5
2007	Sydney	13	21	27	18	211	114	325	98	63	1.3	0.9	10.0	5.4	15.5	4.7	3.0	0
2008	St Kilda	13	19	28	17	181	101	282	104	44	1.5	0.9	9.5	5.3	14.8	5.5	2.3	1
2009	St Kilda	13	24	34	19	211	130	341	108	114	1.4	0.8	8.8	5.4	14.2	4.5	4.8	0
2010	St Kilda	13	25	39	19	268	179	447	120	86	1.6	0.8	10.7	7.2	17.9	4.8	3.4	3
2011	St Kilda	13	21	30	11	206	151	357	98	79	1.4	0.5	9.8	7.2	17.0	4.7	3.8	0
2012	St Kilda	13	8	8	6	66	41	107	35	28	1.0	0.8	8.3	5.1	13.4	4.4	3.5	0
2013	St Kilda	13	5	4	4	52	35	87	22	9	0.8	0.8	10.4	7.0	17.4	4.4	1.8	0
2014	St Kilda	13	13	8	10	141	64	205	56	49	0.6	0.8	10.8	4.9	15.8	4.3	3.8	0
2015	St Kilda	13	15	9	12	156	128	284	70	62	0.6	0.8	10.4	8.5	18.9	4.7	4.1	0
Career			228	259	178	2112	1220	3332	953	702	1.1	0.8	9.3	5.4	14.6	4.2	3.1	10
