= Jared Crouch =

Australian rules footballer

Personal information
- Born: 5 March 1978 (age 48)
- Original team: Norwood (SANFL)
- Debut: Round 7, 1998, Sydney Swans vs. Collingwood, at MCG
- Height: 174 cm (5 ft 9 in)
- Weight: 78 kg (172 lb)

Playing career^{1}
Years	Club	Games (Goals)
1996–2009	Sydney Swans	223 (51)
- ^{1} Playing statistics correct to the end of 2009.

Career highlights
- AFL premiership player: 2005; AFL Rising Star nominee: 1998

Jared Crouch (born 5 March 1978) is a former Australian football player with the Sydney Swans of the Australian Football League (AFL), who is colloquially known as "Crouchie" to Swans fans and the media. He currently serves as a development coach at the Sydney Swans.

Having played for Norwood in the South Australian National Football League (SANFL), Crouch was selected by Sydney in the first round of the 1995 AFL draft. He did not make his senior debut until 1998, when he was called up to play against Collingwood in Round 7, having been originally selected as an emergency for that match. He played in every game for the rest of the season, earning a Rising Star Award nomination, and he did not miss a game in the subsequent seven years.

Crouch is notable for winning the 2002 AFL sprint.

Crouch's first serious injury occurred in the first match of the 2004 International Rules series (played after the AFL season had ended) when he broke a shoulder and it looked like his unbroken run in the AFL would come to an end. However, Crouch was fit to play in the first game of the 2005 AFL season and played every game in Sydney's premiership-winning season. His run finally ended when he was unavailable for Round 13 of the 2006 AFL season. His 194 consecutive games from his debut is an AFL record, and also places him fourth on the AFL list for consecutive games generally. He was overtaken by team-mate Brett Kirk in 2010.

Crouch usually played in the back pocket, where he kept many well-known opponents quiet. His consistency and professionalism saw him in the top 10 of the Swans' best and fairest count six years in a row, but his only recognition from outside the club was selection in the International Rules team that played Ireland in 2003 and 2004.

Crouch announced his retirement from football at the end of the 2009 AFL season.

== Statistics ==
Legend
G	Goals	K	Kicks	D	Disposals	T	Tackles
B	Behinds	H	Handballs	M	Marks

Season	Team	No.	Games	Totals							Averages (per game)						
Season	Team	No.	Games	G	B	K	H	D	M	T	G	B	K	H	D	M	T
1998	Sydney	28	18	0	1	96	80	176	15	40	0.0	0.1	5.3	4.4	9.8	0.8	2.2
1999	Sydney	28	23	6	5	190	133	323	36	51	0.3	0.2	8.3	5.8	14.0	1.6	2.2
2000	Sydney	28	22	4	7	180	111	291	43	40	0.2	0.3	8.2	5.0	13.2	2.0	1.8
2001	Sydney	28	23	6	5	187	143	330	54	59	0.3	0.2	8.1	6.2	14.3	2.3	2.6
2002	Sydney	28	22	4	3	171	113	284	31	65	0.2	0.1	7.8	5.1	12.9	1.4	3.0
2003	Sydney	28	24	6	2	153	90	243	37	94	0.3	0.1	6.4	3.8	10.1	1.5	3.9
2004	Sydney	28	24	8	9	177	142	319	38	86	0.3	0.4	7.4	5.9	13.3	1.6	3.6
2005	Sydney	28	26	8	2	180	143	323	51	72	0.3	0.1	6.9	5.5	12.4	2.0	2.8
2006	Sydney	28	12	3	7	94	54	148	37	37	0.3	0.6	7.8	4.5	12.3	3.1	3.1
2007	Sydney	28	8	3	0	63	32	95	17	18	0.4	0.0	7.9	4.0	11.9	2.1	2.3
2008	Sydney	28	7	1	1	65	36	101	13	19	0.1	0.1	9.3	5.1	14.4	1.9	2.7
2009	Sydney	28	14	2	2	89	57	146	31	40	0.1	0.1	6.4	4.1	10.4	2.2	2.9
Career			223	51	44	1645	1134	2779	403	621	0.2	0.2	7.4	5.1	12.5	1.8	2.8
