= Nic Fosdike =

Australian rules footballer

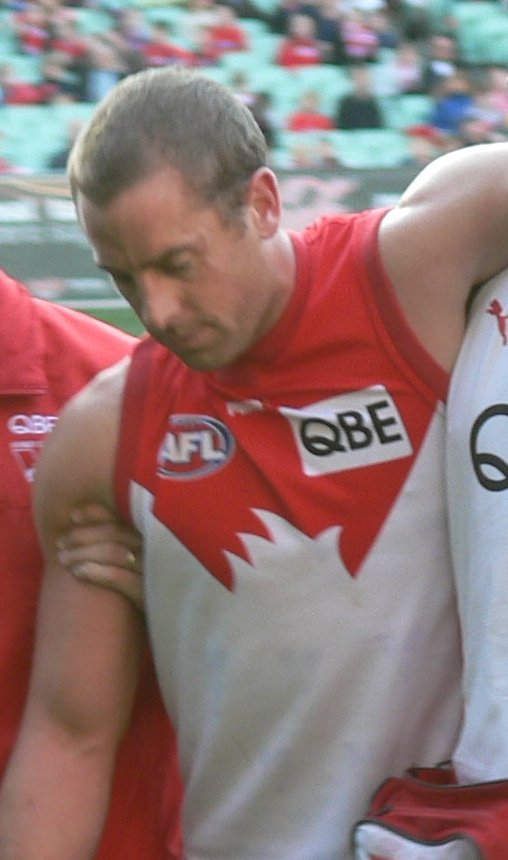
- Nic Fosdike being carried off by trainers

Personal information
- Born: 26 February 1980 (age 46)
- Original team: Norwood Football Club (SANFL)
- Debut: Round 5, 25 April 1999, Sydney Swans vs. Adelaide Crows, at AAMI Stadium
- Height: 179 cm (5 ft 10 in)
- Weight: 82 kg (181 lb)

Playing career^{1}
Years	Club	Games (Goals)
1999–2008	Sydney Swans	164 (66)
- ^{1} Playing statistics correct to the end of 2008.

Career highlights
- Sydney premiership player - 2005

Nicholas "Nic" Fosdike (born 26 February 1980) is a former Australian rules footballer who played in the Australian Football League (AFL) for the Sydney Swans.

== Career ==
Originally from South Australian National Football League (SANFL) club Norwood, Fosdike was chosen at number three by the Swans in the 1998 AFL draft and made his senior AFL debut in Round Five, 1999 against the Adelaide Crows.

Fosdike was one of the best players on field during Sydney's 2005 AFL Grand Final win with 26 disposals.

He injured his knee during the 2008 pre-season and after only playing one game towards the end of the 2008 season, he announced his retirement from the AFL in January 2009.

Fosdike played 164 games between 1999 and 2009.

== Statistics ==
Legend
G	Goals	K	Kicks	D	Disposals	T	Tackles
B	Behinds	H	Handballs	M	Marks

Season	Team	No.	Games	Totals							Averages (per game)						
Season	Team	No.	Games	G	B	K	H	D	M	T	G	B	K	H	D	M	T
1999	Sydney	12	13	8	5	86	36	122	27	12	0.6	0.4	6.6	2.8	9.4	2.1	0.9
2000	Sydney	12	17	9	9	143	49	192	35	24	0.5	0.5	8.4	2.9	11.3	2.1	1.4
2001	Sydney	12	17	4	9	121	53	174	35	31	0.2	0.5	7.1	3.1	10.2	2.1	1.8
2002	Sydney	12	21	14	7	251	110	361	66	54	0.7	0.3	12.0	5.2	17.2	3.1	2.6
2003	Sydney	12	24	9	9	267	113	380	57	74	0.4	0.4	11.1	4.7	15.8	2.4	3.1
2004	Sydney	12	13	3	4	126	85	211	33	39	0.2	0.3	9.7	6.5	16.2	2.5	3.0
2005	Sydney	12	11	6	1	107	62	169	36	31	0.5	0.1	9.7	5.6	15.4	3.3	2.8
2006	Sydney	12	24	7	2	266	103	369	91	82	0.3	0.1	11.1	4.3	15.4	3.8	3.4
2007	Sydney	12	23	6	3	277	128	405	89	89	0.3	0.1	12.0	5.6	17.6	3.9	3.9
2008	Sydney	12	1	0	1	11	4	15	1	3	0.0	1.0	11.0	4.0	15.0	1.0	3.0
Career			164	66	50	1655	743	2398	470	439	0.4	0.3	10.1	4.5	14.6	2.9	2.7
