= 2005 AFL season =

109th season of the Australian Football League (AFL)

2005 AFL premiership season
- Teams: 16
- Premiers: Sydney; 4th premiership
- Minor premiers: Adelaide; 1st minor premiership
- Pre-season cup: Carlton; 2nd pre-season cup win
- Brownlow Medallist: Ben Cousins (West Coast)
- Coleman Medallist: Fraser Gehrig (St Kilda)

Attendance
- Matches played: 185
- Total attendance: 6,763,852 (36,561 per match)
- Highest: 91,828 (Grand Final, Sydney vs. West Coast)

The 2005 AFL season was the 109th season of the Australian Football League (AFL), the highest level senior Australian rules football competition in Australia, which was known as the Victorian Football League until 1989. The season featured sixteen clubs, ran from 24 March until 24 September, and comprised a 22-game home-and-away season followed by a finals series featuring the top eight clubs.

The premiership was won by the Sydney Swans for the fourth time, after they defeated West Coast by four points in the AFL Grand Final. It was the club's first premiership since it won the 1933 premiership as South Melbourne, and ended a 72-year premiership drought which stands as the longest in league history.

== Wizard Home Loans Cup ==
Carlton defeated West Coast 1.14.18 (111) to 1.11.9 (84) in the Grand Final.

== Premiership season ==
=== Round 1 (Easter and season launch) ===
	Round 1 (Easter and season launch)
Thursday, 24 March (7:40 pm)	Brisbane Lions 18.8 (116)	def.	St Kilda 13.15 (93)	The Gabba (crowd: 33,369)
Saturday, 26 March (2:15 pm)	Kangaroos 16.9 (105)	def.	Carlton 12.13 (85)	Telstra Dome (crowd: 40,345)
Saturday, 26 March (7:20 pm)	Melbourne 15.13 (103)	def.	Essendon 8.9 (57)	MCG (crowd: 47,849)
Saturday, 26 March (5:40 pm)	Fremantle 13.10 (88)	def.	Port Adelaide 7.11 (53)	Subiaco Oval (crowd: 33,704)
Sunday, 27 March (1:15 pm)	Sydney 18.10 (118)	def.	Hawthorn 8.7 (55)	SCG (crowd: 27,274)
Sunday, 27 March (2:15 pm)	Richmond 15.8 (98)	def. by	Geelong 25.10 (160)	MCG (crowd: 48,251)
Sunday, 27 March (2:45 pm)	Adelaide 7.11 (53)	def. by	West Coast 9.10 (64)	AAMI Stadium (crowd: 39,055)
Monday, 28 March (2:15 pm)	Collingwood 11.14 (80)	def. by	Western Bulldogs 16.16 (112)	MCG (crowd: 53,259)

=== Round 2 ===
	Round 2
Friday, 1 April (7:40 pm)	Carlton 16.14 (110)	def.	Essendon 17.4 (106)	MCG (crowd: 56,446)
Saturday, 2 April (2:10 pm)	Kangaroos 12.10 (82)	def.	Sydney 7.17 (59)	Manuka Oval (crowd: 13,481)
Saturday, 2 April (2:10 pm)	Western Bulldogs 15.21 (111)	def. by	Melbourne 20.17 (137)	Telstra Dome (crowd: 26,307)
Saturday, 2 April (7:10 pm)	Port Adelaide 11.9 (75)	def.	Brisbane Lions 11.7 (73)	AAMI Stadium (crowd: 34,982)
Saturday, 2 April (5:40 pm)	West Coast 12.12 (84)	def.	Geelong 8.14 (62)	Subiaco Oval (crowd: 39,578)
Sunday, 3 April (1:10 pm)	St Kilda 8.11 (59)	def.	Fremantle 8.10 (58)	Aurora Stadium (crowd: 12,465)
Sunday, 3 April (2:10 pm)	Collingwood 10.15 (75)	def. by	Adelaide 12.9 (81)	Telstra Dome (crowd: 31,464)
Sunday, 3 April (2:10 pm)	Hawthorn 12.17 (89)	def. by	Richmond 16.7 (103)	MCG (crowd: 33,409)

=== Round 3 (Rivalry Round) ===
	Round 3 (Rivalry Round)
Friday, 8 April (7:40 pm)	Melbourne 18.6 (114)	def.	Geelong 8.18 (66)	MCG (crowd: 51,793)
Saturday, 9 April (2:10 pm)	Carlton 16.12 (108)	def. by	Collingwood 20.8 (128)	MCG (crowd: 61,608)
Saturday, 9 April (2:10 pm)	St Kilda 14.9 (93)	def. by	Kangaroos 15.10 (100)	Telstra Dome (crowd: 36,140)
Saturday, 9 April (7:10 pm)	Brisbane Lions 11.15 (81)	def. by	Sydney 13.9 (87)	The Gabba (crowd: 33,960)
Saturday, 9 April (5:40 pm)	Fremantle 12.8 (80)	def. by	West Coast 12.16 (88)	Subiaco Oval (crowd: 42,027)
Sunday, 10 April (12:40 pm)	Adelaide 18.16 (124)	def.	Port Adelaide 8.8 (56)	AAMI Stadium (crowd: 44,807)
Sunday, 10 April (2:10 pm)	Essendon 10.17 (77)	def.	Hawthorn 11.9 (75)	MCG (crowd: 44,971)
Sunday, 10 April (2:10 pm)	Western Bulldogs 11.18 (84)	def. by	Richmond 12.16 (88)	Telstra Dome (crowd: 30,871)
Michael Voss of the Brisbane Lions played his 250th game.; David Neitz of the Melbourne Demons played his 250th game.; Barry Hall kicked a goal after the siren to defeat the Brisbane Lions. He became the first of two players to do it twice and at two different clubs.

=== Round 4 ===
	Round 4
Friday, 15 April (7:40 pm)	Kangaroos 14.9 (93)	def.	Collingwood 13.12 (90)	MCG (crowd: 51,565)
Saturday, 16 April (2:10 pm)	Hawthorn 18.7 (115)	def.	Brisbane Lions 10.9 (69)	MCG (crowd: 27,778)
Saturday, 16 April (2:10 pm)	West Coast 21.17 (143)	def.	Western Bulldogs 17.5 (107)	Subiaco Oval (crowd: 39,124)
Saturday, 16 April (7:10 pm)	Geelong 19.17 (131)	def.	Essendon 11.9 (75)	Telstra Dome (crowd: 48,653)
Saturday, 16 April (7:10 pm)	Port Adelaide 15.19 (109)	drew with	Carlton 16.13 (109)	AAMI Stadium (crowd: 33,519)
Sunday, 17 April (1:10 pm)	Sydney 11.13 (79)	def. by	Adelaide 18.12 (120)	SCG (crowd: 30,478)
Sunday, 17 April (2:10 pm)	Richmond 14.16 (100)	def.	Fremantle 7.10 (52)	MCG (crowd: 24,242)
Sunday, 17 April (2:10 pm)	St Kilda 23.13 (151)	def.	Melbourne 15.14 (104)	Telstra Dome (crowd: 40,004)

=== Round 5 (ANZAC Day) ===
	Round 5 (ANZAC Day)
Friday, 22 April (8:10 pm)	Port Adelaide 15.5 (95)	def. by	Geelong 15.9 (99)	AAMI Stadium (crowd: 33,405)
Saturday, 23 April (2:10 pm)	Kangaroos 16.12 (108)	def.	Hawthorn 13.11 (89)	MCG (crowd: 38,764)
Saturday, 23 April (2:10 pm)	Fremantle 15.13 (103)	def.	Carlton 11.18 (84)	Subiaco Oval (crowd: 36,056)
Saturday, 23 April (7:10 pm)	Sydney 7.18 (60)	def. by	Melbourne 14.10 (94)	SCG (crowd: 29,099)
Saturday, 23 April (7:10 pm)	Western Bulldogs 21.14 (140)	def.	Adelaide 16.13 (109)	Telstra Dome (crowd: 27,900)
Sunday, 24 April (1:10 pm)	Brisbane Lions 12.12 (84)	def. by	West Coast 23.19 (157)	The Gabba (crowd: 33,007)
Sunday, 24 April (5:10 pm)	St Kilda 22.15 (147)	def.	Richmond 11.13 (79)	Telstra Dome (crowd: 49,580)
Monday, 25 April (2:10 pm)	Essendon 11.17 (83)	def.	Collingwood 10.9 (69)	MCG (crowd: 70,033)
Chris Grant of the Western Bulldogs played his 300th game.; At the end of this round, the Brisbane Lions, triple-premiers between 2001–03 and grand finalists in 2004, dropped to the bottom of the ladder.

=== Round 6 ===
	Round 6
Friday, 29 April (7:40 pm)	Carlton 13.11 (89)	def.	Hawthorn 12.11 (83)	Telstra Dome (crowd: 49,018)
Saturday, 30 April (2:10 pm)	Melbourne 20.9 (129)	def. by	Fremantle 22.11 (143)	MCG (crowd: 21,963)
Saturday, 30 April (2:10 pm)	Adelaide 10.14 (74)	def.	Kangaroos 10.4 (64)	AAMI Stadium (crowd: 41,867)
Saturday, 30 April (7:10 pm)	Essendon 12.16 (88)	def. by	Brisbane Lions 21.10 (136)	Telstra Dome (crowd: 44,055)
Saturday, 30 April (5:40 pm)	West Coast 15.14 (104)	def.	Sydney 8.11 (59)	Subiaco Oval (crowd: 39,687)
Sunday, 1 May (1:10 pm)	Geelong 16.12 (108)	def.	Western Bulldogs 11.7 (73)	Skilled Stadium (crowd: 23,019)
Sunday, 1 May (2:10 pm)	Collingwood 10.11 (71)	def. by	St Kilda 16.13 (109)	MCG (crowd: 44,122)
Sunday, 1 May (2:10 pm)	Richmond 19.9 (123)	def.	Port Adelaide 9.13 (67)	Telstra Dome (crowd: 21,301)

=== Round 7 (Mother's Day) ===
	Round 7 (Mother's Day)
Friday, 6 May (7:40 pm)	Melbourne 12.7 (79)	def.	Adelaide 7.12 (54)	MCG (crowd: 39,475)
Saturday, 7 May (2:10 pm)	Geelong 18.11 (119)	def.	St Kilda 15.11 (101)	Telstra Dome (crowd: 44,814)
Saturday, 7 May (2:10 pm)	Richmond 23.13 (151)	def.	Carlton 10.6 (66)	MCG (crowd: 52,234)
Saturday, 7 May (7:10 pm)	Brisbane Lions 12.15 (87)	def. by	Western Bulldogs 15.20 (110)	The Gabba (crowd: 30,639)
Saturday, 7 May (7:10 pm)	Sydney 13.16 (94)	def.	Essendon 14.4 (88)	Telstra Stadium (crowd: 31,668)
Sunday, 8 May (1:10 pm)	Hawthorn 12.5 (77)	def. by	West Coast 14.12 (96)	Aurora Stadium (crowd: 16,933)
Sunday, 8 May (2:40 pm)	Port Adelaide 18.11 (119)	def.	Kangaroos 10.12 (72)	AAMI Stadium (crowd: 27,050)
Sunday, 8 May (2:40 pm)	Fremantle 28.12 (180)	def.	Collingwood 10.8 (68)	Subiaco Oval (crowd: 36,491)
Fremantle's 112-point win is its biggest against Collingwood.; Fremantle's score of 180 is also the highest score in the clubs history as of 2025.

=== Round 8 ===
	Round 8
Friday, 13 May (7:40 pm)	Carlton 10.13 (73)	def. by	Geelong 22.11 (143)	Telstra Dome (crowd: 45,758)
Saturday, 14 May (2:10 pm)	Hawthorn 19.14 (128)	def.	Melbourne 13.11 (89)	MCG (crowd: 38,587)
Saturday, 14 May (2:10 pm)	West Coast 13.10 (88)	def.	St Kilda 7.10 (52)	Subiaco Oval (crowd: 41,177)
Saturday, 14 May (7:10 pm)	Kangaroos 13.14 (92)	def. by	Western Bulldogs 18.10 (118)	Telstra Dome (crowd: 32,901)
Saturday, 14 May (7:10 pm)	Adelaide 8.15 (63)	def. by	Brisbane Lions 11.6 (72)	AAMI Stadium (crowd: 42,357)
Sunday, 15 May (1:10 pm)	Sydney 9.15 (69)	def.	Port Adelaide 6.9 (45)	SCG (crowd: 24,226)
Sunday, 15 May (2:10 pm)	Collingwood 8.10 (58)	def. by	Richmond 13.15 (93)	MCG (crowd: 54,330)
Sunday, 15 May (2:10 pm)	Essendon 17.15 (117)	def.	Fremantle 11.16 (82)	Telstra Dome (crowd: 30,383)

=== Round 9 (Community Weekend) ===
	Round 9 (Community Weekend)
Friday, 20 May (7:40 pm)	St Kilda 8.9 (57)	def. by	Adelaide 15.13 (103)	Telstra Dome (crowd: 35,100)
Saturday, 21 May (2:10 pm)	Carlton 13.14 (92)	def. by	Melbourne 15.20 (110)	Optus Oval (crowd: 30,052)
Saturday, 21 May (2:10 pm)	Collingwood 18.10 (118)	def.	West Coast 15.5 (95)	MCG (crowd: 31,105)
Saturday, 21 May (7:10 pm)	Brisbane Lions 12.11 (83)	def. by	Richmond 12.15 (87)	The Gabba (crowd: 33,684)
Saturday, 21 May (7:10 pm)	Port Adelaide 12.13 (85)	def.	Essendon 9.12 (66)	AAMI Stadium (crowd: 33,648)
Sunday, 22 May (1:10 pm)	Western Bulldogs 10.16 (76)	def. by	Sydney 13.11 (89)	SCG (crowd: 22,358)
Sunday, 22 May (2:10 pm)	Geelong 22.14 (146)	def.	Kangaroos 8.13 (61)	Skilled Stadium (crowd: 24,102)
Sunday, 22 May (2:40 pm)	Fremantle 10.10 (70)	def. by	Hawthorn 18.16 (124)	Subiaco Oval (crowd: 35,393)
Carlton played its last match at Princes Park (known at the time as Optus Oval), its home ground since 1897. The venue was the last suburban ground in use in Melbourne.; West Coast suffered its first loss for the season, against Collingwood (who was on the bottom of the ladder at the time).; At the end of this round, the AFL's three most successful clubs, Essendon, Carlton and Collingwood occupied the bottom three places on the AFL ladder.

=== Round 10 ===
	Round 10
Friday, 27 May (7:40 pm)	Melbourne 20.11 (131)	def.	Richmond 11.8 (74)	Telstra Dome (crowd: 44,263)
Saturday, 28 May (2:10 pm)	Geelong 11.16 (82)	def. by	Fremantle 14.7 (91)	Skilled Stadium (crowd: 20,869)
Saturday, 28 May (2:10 pm)	Hawthorn 12.8 (80)	def. by	Collingwood 17.6 (108)	MCG (crowd: 49,927)
Saturday, 28 May (7:10 pm)	Brisbane Lions 13.15 (93)	def. by	Kangaroos 17.10 (112)	The Gabba (crowd: 29,500)
Saturday, 28 May (7:10 pm)	St Kilda 15.11 (101)	def.	Sydney 8.10 (58)	Telstra Dome (crowd: 37,014)
Sunday, 29 May (12:40 pm)	Adelaide 9.17 (71)	def.	Carlton 8.9 (57)	AAMI Stadium (crowd: 43,277)
Sunday, 29 May (2:10 pm)	Essendon 21.11 (137)	def.	Western Bulldogs 17.8 (110)	Telstra Dome (crowd: 40,454)
Sunday, 29 May (2:40 pm)	West Coast 27.17 (179)	def.	Port Adelaide 9.8 (62)	Subiaco Oval (crowd: 40,188)
Fraser Gehrig of St Kilda played his 200th game.; AFL CEO Andrew Demetriou, Network 10 television commentators Stephen Quartermain and Tim Lane, and former Carlton great Robert Walls, all famously criticised eventual premiers the Sydney Swans' style of play in its loss against St Kilda, stating it could not win a premiership under Paul Roos' coaching. This was the second last match played by future Adelaide coach Matthew Nicks, who retired before the end of the season. It proves to be a major turning point in the Swans' season as they would only lose three more matches for the season, all by seven points or less, on its way to its first AFL premiership in 72 years.; West Coast recorded its biggest victory over Port Adelaide, winning by 117 points.

=== Round 11 ===
	Round 11
Friday, 3 June (7:40 pm)	Collingwood 18.13 (121)	def.	Geelong 14.12 (96)	Telstra Dome (crowd: 48,261)
Saturday, 4 June (2:10 pm)	Carlton 14.7 (91)	def. by	Sydney 18.8 (116)	Telstra Dome (crowd: 30,973)
Saturday, 4 June (2:10 pm)	Richmond 15.13 (103)	def. by	West Coast 15.15 (105)	MCG (crowd: 31,704)
Saturday, 4 June (7:10 pm)	Adelaide 24.7 (151)	def.	Essendon 9.9 (63)	AAMI Stadium (crowd: 43,486)
Saturday, 4 June (5:40 pm)	Fremantle 10.7 (67)	def. by	Brisbane Lions 15.16 (106)	Subiaco Oval (crowd: 34,143)
Sunday, 5 June (1:10 pm)	Kangaroos 11.14 (80)	def. by	Melbourne 17.14 (116)	Manuka Oval (crowd: 12,626)
Sunday, 5 June (1:10 pm)	St Kilda 11.15 (81)	def. by	Port Adelaide 16.8 (104)	Aurora Stadium (crowd: 17,402)
Sunday, 5 June (2:10 pm)	Western Bulldogs 17.9 (111)	def.	Hawthorn 13.11 (89)	Telstra Dome (crowd: 29,240)

=== Round 12 (Queen's Birthday) ===
	Round 12 (Queen's Birthday)
Friday, 10 June (6:40 pm)	West Coast 15.16 (106)	def.	Essendon 12.10 (82)	Subiaco Oval (crowd: 38,558)
Saturday, 11 June (2:10 pm)	Hawthorn 8.6 (54)	def. by	St Kilda 15.10 (100)	MCG (crowd: 33,905)
Saturday, 11 June (7:10 pm)	Carlton 12.10 (82)	def. by	Brisbane Lions 21.14 (140)	Telstra Dome (crowd: 37,880)
Saturday, 11 June (7:10 pm)	Port Adelaide 17.16 (118)	def.	Western Bulldogs 15.13 (103)	AAMI Stadium (crowd: 27,079)
Sunday, 12 June (1:10 pm)	Sydney 16.13 (109)	def.	Fremantle 10.11 (71)	SCG (crowd: 24,933)
Sunday, 12 June (2:10 pm)	Geelong 9.7 (61)	def.	Adelaide 8.9 (57)	Skilled Stadium (crowd: 23,506)
Sunday, 12 June (2:10 pm)	Kangaroos 17.7 (109)	def.	Richmond 10.20 (80)	Telstra Dome (crowd: 40,444)
Monday, 13 June (2:10 pm)	Melbourne 17.15 (117)	def.	Collingwood 10.12 (72)	MCG (crowd: 65,347)

=== Round 13 (Split Round) ===
	Round 13 (Split Round)
Friday, 17 June (8:10 pm)	Port Adelaide 29.14 (188)	def.	Hawthorn 10.11 (71)	AAMI Stadium (crowd: 30,212)
Saturday, 18 June (2:10 pm)	Melbourne 13.12 (90)	def. by	West Coast 15.15 (105)	MCG (crowd: 35,653)
Saturday, 18 June (7:10 pm)	Richmond 9.8 (62)	def. by	Adelaide 20.12 (132)	Telstra Dome (crowd: 27,092)
Saturday, 18 June (7:10 pm)	Western Bulldogs 17.14 (116)	def.	Carlton 10.10 (70)	Marrara Oval (crowd: 13,037)
Sunday, 19 June (1:10 pm)	Brisbane Lions 17.14 (116)	def.	Geelong 6.11 (47)	The Gabba (crowd: 31,307)
Sunday, 19 June (2:40 pm)	Fremantle 6.8 (44)	def. by	Kangaroos 8.18 (66)	Subiaco Oval (crowd: 33,550)
Friday, 24 June (7:40 pm)	Essendon 19.5 (119)	def.	St Kilda 16.8 (104)	Telstra Dome (crowd: 48,342)
Saturday, 25 June (7:10 pm)	Sydney 11.11 (77)	def.	Collingwood 10.16 (76)	Telstra Stadium (crowd: 44,387)
Port Adelaide recorded its biggest ever win over Hawthorn.; The Brisbane Lions recorded their biggest ever win over Geelong.; Matthew Lloyd of Essendon played his 200th game.

=== Round 14 (Family Round) ===
	Round 14 (Family Round)
Friday, 1 July (7:40 pm)	Collingwood 14.18 (102)	def.	Port Adelaide 9.17 (71)	Telstra Dome (crowd: 35,844)
Saturday, 2 July (2:10 pm)	Richmond 12.13 (85)	def.	Sydney 12.12 (84)	MCG (crowd: 34,572)
Saturday, 2 July (2:10 pm)	West Coast 21.13 (139)	def.	Carlton 9.8 (62)	Subiaco Oval (crowd: 39,928)
Saturday, 2 July (7:10 pm)	Essendon 13.8 (86)	def. by	Kangaroos 19.14 (128)	Telstra Dome (crowd: 48,696)
Saturday, 2 July (7:10 pm)	Melbourne 13.14 (92)	def. by	Brisbane Lions 25.16 (166)	The Gabba (crowd: 31,259)
Sunday, 3 July (12:40 pm)	Adelaide 14.10 (94)	def.	Fremantle 14.4 (88)	AAMI Stadium (crowd: 41,794)
Sunday, 3 July (2:10 pm)	Western Bulldogs 15.8 (98)	def. by	St Kilda 17.14 (116)	MCG (crowd: 33,622)
Sunday, 3 July (2:10 pm)	Geelong 16.17 (113)	def.	Hawthorn 8.10 (58)	Telstra Dome (crowd: 36,667)

=== Round 15 ===
	Round 15
Friday, 8 July (7:40 pm)	Kangaroos 14.13 (97)	def. by	West Coast 15.11 (101)	Telstra Dome (crowd: 33,151)
Saturday, 9 July (2:10 pm)	Richmond 14.8 (92)	def.	Essendon 9.12 (66)	MCG (crowd: 49,975)
Saturday, 9 July (2:10 pm)	Port Adelaide 20.17 (137)	def.	Melbourne 11.9 (75)	AAMI Stadium (crowd: 28,040)
Saturday, 9 July (7:10 pm)	Brisbane Lions 19.19 (133)	def.	Collingwood 7.13 (55)	The Gabba (crowd: 37,224)
Saturday, 9 July (7:10 pm)	Sydney 16.9 (105)	def.	Geelong 7.9 (51)	SCG (crowd: 28,185)
Sunday, 10 July (1:10 pm)	Hawthorn 10.8 (68)	def. by	Adelaide 12.6 (78)	Aurora Stadium (crowd: 15,282)
Sunday, 10 July (2:10 pm)	St Kilda 23.15 (153)	def.	Carlton 11.7 (73)	Telstra Dome (crowd: 39,181)
Sunday, 10 July (2:40 pm)	Fremantle 22.13 (145)	def.	Western Bulldogs 13.14 (92)	Subiaco Oval (crowd: 30,991)
The inaugural Dreamtime at the 'G was played between Richmond and Essendon.; Collingwood was held goalless in the first half for the first time since Round 22, 1981.

=== Round 16 ===
	Round 16
Friday, 15 July (7:40 pm)	Collingwood 15.15 (105)	def. by	Essendon 21.5 (131)	MCG (crowd: 52,507)
Saturday, 16 July (2:10 pm)	Geelong 18.18 (126)	def.	Port Adelaide 7.5 (47)	Skilled Stadium (crowd: 19,362)
Saturday, 16 July (2:10 pm)	Richmond 5.7 (37)	def. by	St Kilda 16.10 (106)	MCG (crowd: 40,043)
Saturday, 16 July (7:10 pm)	Melbourne 11.12 (78)	def. by	Sydney 16.8 (104)	Telstra Dome (crowd: 28,749)
Saturday, 16 July (5:40 pm)	West Coast 17.9 (111)	def.	Brisbane Lions 13.10 (88)	Subiaco Oval (crowd: 41,524)
Sunday, 17 July (12:40 pm)	Adelaide 16.13 (109)	def.	Western Bulldogs 5.5 (35)	AAMI Stadium (crowd: 40,264)
Sunday, 17 July (2:10 pm)	Carlton 17.15 (117)	def. by	Fremantle 24.8 (152)	MCG (crowd: 16,076)
Sunday, 17 July (2:10 pm)	Hawthorn 10.8 (68)	def. by	Kangaroos 16.13 (109)	Telstra Dome (crowd: 23,722)
Ben Cousins of West Coast played his 200th AFL game.

=== Round 17 ===
	Round 17
Friday, 22 July (7:40 pm)	St Kilda 21.17 (143)	def.	Collingwood 10.10 (70)	Telstra Dome (crowd: 45,576)
Saturday, 23 July (2:10 pm)	Hawthorn 19.13 (127)	def.	Carlton 15.13 (103)	MCG (crowd: 31,459)
Saturday, 23 July (2:10 pm)	Western Bulldogs 20.13 (133)	def.	Geelong 14.14 (98)	Telstra Dome (crowd: 29,351)
Saturday, 23 July (7:10 pm)	Brisbane Lions 17.12 (114)	def.	Essendon 14.17 (101)	The Gabba (crowd: 36,077)
Saturday, 23 July (7:10 pm)	Port Adelaide 14.12 (92)	def.	Richmond 12.11 (83)	AAMI Stadium (crowd: 27,455)
Sunday, 24 July (12:40 pm)	Sydney 13.10 (88)	def.	West Coast 10.7 (67)	SCG (crowd: 37,071)
Sunday, 24 July (2:10 pm)	Kangaroos 16.13 (109)	def. by	Adelaide 19.8 (122)	Telstra Dome (crowd: 25,263)
Sunday, 24 July (2:40 pm)	Fremantle 15.11 (101)	def.	Melbourne 11.10 (76)	Subiaco Oval (crowd: 31,028)

=== Round 18 ===
	Round 18
Friday, 29 July (7:40 pm)	Essendon 16.11 (107)	def.	Geelong 13.16 (94)	Telstra Dome (crowd: 47,122)
Saturday, 30 July (2:10 pm)	Melbourne 13.10 (88)	def. by	St Kilda 27.14 (176)	MCG (crowd: 39,584)
Saturday, 30 July (2:10 pm)	West Coast 12.25 (97)	def.	Hawthorn 7.7 (49)	Subiaco Oval (crowd: 39,412)
Saturday, 30 July (7:10 pm)	Western Bulldogs 23.13 (151)	def.	Brisbane Lions 18.15 (123)	Telstra Dome (crowd: 29,200)
Saturday, 30 July (7:10 pm)	Adelaide 8.6 (54)	def.	Sydney 6.11 (47)	AAMI Stadium (crowd: 45,629)
Sunday, 31 July (1:10 pm)	Kangaroos 15.10 (100)	def.	Port Adelaide 14.12 (96)	Manuka Oval (crowd: 10,431)
Sunday, 31 July (2:10 pm)	Carlton 22.9 (141)	def.	Richmond 16.10 (106)	Telstra Dome (crowd: 34,925)
Sunday, 31 July (2:10 pm)	Collingwood 12.13 (85)	def. by	Fremantle 15.8 (98)	MCG (crowd: 26,586)

=== Round 19 ===
	Round 19
Friday, 5 August (7:40 pm)	St Kilda 13.18 (96)	def.	Geelong 8.7 (55)	Telstra Dome (crowd: 46,848)
Saturday, 6 August (2:10 pm)	Western Bulldogs 21.14 (140)	def.	West Coast 14.13 (97)	MCG (crowd: 27,693)
Saturday, 6 August (2:10 pm)	Adelaide 13.22 (100)	def.	Melbourne 7.4 (46)	AAMI Stadium (crowd: 42,843)
Saturday, 6 August (7:10 pm)	Essendon 15.8 (98)	def. by	Sydney 18.10 (118)	Telstra Dome (crowd: 41,629)
Saturday, 6 August (5:40 pm)	Fremantle 13.15 (93)	def.	Richmond 9.12 (66)	Subiaco Oval (crowd: 36,026)
Sunday, 7 August (1:10 pm)	Brisbane Lions 18.13 (121)	def.	Hawthorn 11.14 (80)	The Gabba (crowd: 31,946)
Sunday, 7 August (2:10 pm)	Carlton 16.13 (109)	def. by	Port Adelaide 18.15 (123)	MCG (crowd: 16,371)
Sunday, 7 August (2:10 pm)	Collingwood 14.14 (98)	def. by	Kangaroos 15.14 (104)	Telstra Dome (crowd: 33,587)
Scott Lucas of Essendon played his 200th AFL game.

=== Round 20 (Heritage Round) ===
	Round 20 (Heritage Round)
Friday, 12 August (6:40 pm)	West Coast 19.14 (128)	def.	Fremantle 12.8 (80)	Subiaco Oval (crowd: 40,720)
Saturday, 13 August (2:10 pm)	Geelong 15.9 (99)	def. by	Melbourne 14.16 (100)	Skilled Stadium (crowd: 20,148)
Saturday, 13 August (2:10 pm)	Kangaroos 13.7 (85)	def. by	St Kilda 16.12 (108)	Telstra Dome (crowd: 39,777)
Saturday, 13 August (7:10 pm)	Collingwood 14.10 (94)	def. by	Carlton 19.15 (129)	MCG (crowd: 48,287)
Saturday, 13 August (7:10 pm)	Port Adelaide 12.9 (81)	def. by	Adelaide 13.10 (88)	AAMI Stadium (crowd: 45,199)
Sunday, 14 August (1:10 pm)	Sydney 19.10 (124)	def.	Brisbane Lions 6.4 (40)	Telstra Stadium (crowd: 43,512)
Sunday, 14 August (2:10 pm)	Hawthorn 17.15 (117)	def.	Essendon 16.8 (104)	MCG (crowd: 32,053)
Sunday, 14 August (2:10 pm)	Richmond 16.11 (107)	def. by	Western Bulldogs 18.11 (119)	Telstra Dome (crowd: 33,482)
Melbourne defeated Geelong at Skilled Stadium (Kardinia Park) for the first time since 1988.

=== Round 21 ===
	Round 21
Friday, 19 August (6:40 pm)	Fremantle 12.8 (80)	def.	St Kilda 11.9 (75)	Subiaco Oval (crowd: 38,057)
Saturday, 20 August (2:10 pm)	Geelong 16.13 (109)	def.	West Coast 5.3 (33)	Skilled Stadium (crowd: 20,372)
Saturday, 20 August (2:10 pm)	Adelaide 22.19 (151)	def.	Collingwood 5.11 (41)	AAMI Stadium (crowd: 40,372)
Saturday, 20 August (7:10 pm)	Melbourne 16.13 (109)	def.	Western Bulldogs 16.9 (105)	MCG (crowd: 32,621)
Saturday, 20 August (7:10 pm)	Brisbane Lions 7.9 (51)	def. by	Port Adelaide 11.15 (81)	The Gabba (crowd: 35,221)
Sunday, 21 August (1:10 pm)	Sydney 15.11 (101)	def.	Kangaroos 9.10 (64)	SCG (crowd: 34,975)
Sunday, 21 August (2:10 pm)	Essendon 28.14 (182)	def.	Carlton 11.17 (83)	MCG (crowd: 37,481)
Sunday, 21 August (2:10 pm)	Richmond 20.17 (137)	def.	Hawthorn 21.7 (133)	Telstra Dome (crowd: 30,906)

=== Round 22 ===
	Round 22
Friday, 26 August (7:40 pm)	Western Bulldogs 21.15 (141)	def.	Collingwood 14.16 (100)	Telstra Dome (crowd: 41,947)
Saturday, 27 August (2:10 pm)	Hawthorn 11.9 (75)	def. by	Sydney 20.9 (129)	MCG (crowd: 31,891)
Saturday, 27 August (2:10 pm)	West Coast 10.14 (74)	def. by	Adelaide 12.10 (82)	Subiaco Oval (crowd: 43,044)
Saturday, 27 August (7:10 pm)	St Kilda 28.18 (186)	def.	Brisbane Lions 7.5 (47)	Telstra Dome (crowd: 46,105)
Saturday, 27 August (7:10 pm)	Port Adelaide 18.12 (120)	def.	Fremantle 11.9 (75)	AAMI Stadium (crowd: 41,518)
Sunday, 28 August (1:10 pm)	Geelong 10.9 (69)	def.	Richmond 10.8 (68)	Skilled Stadium (crowd: 24,096)
Sunday, 28 August (2:10 pm)	Carlton 12.11 (83)	def. by	Kangaroos 17.11 (113)	Telstra Dome (crowd: 27,625)
Sunday, 28 August (2:10 pm)	Essendon 12.13 (85)	def. by	Melbourne 13.17 (95)	MCG (crowd: 55,016)
St Kilda's 139-point win against the Brisbane Lions was the largest victory in St Kilda's history, and the heaviest defeat in the Brisbane Lions' history. The loss ensured the Lions would miss the finals for the first time since 1998.; The match between West Coast and Adelaide saw the two teams play off for the minor premiership, with the Crows winning the game and finishing on top of the ladder on percentage ahead of the Eagles.

== Ladder ==
2005 AFL ladder
Pos	Team	Pld	W	L	D	PF	PA	PP	Pts	
1	Adelaide	22	17	5	0	2070	1517	136.5	68	Finals series
2	West Coast	22	17	5	0	2261	1824	124.0	68	Finals series
3	Sydney (P)	22	15	7	0	1974	1696	116.4	60	Finals series
4	St Kilda	22	14	8	0	2407	1806	133.3	56	Finals series
5	Kangaroos	22	13	9	0	2053	2069	99.2	52	Finals series
6	Geelong	22	12	10	0	2134	1906	112.0	48	Finals series
7	Melbourne	22	12	10	0	2171	2266	95.8	48	Finals series
8	Port Adelaide	22	11	10	1	2028	2066	98.2	46	Finals series
9	Western Bulldogs	22	11	11	0	2385	2351	101.4	44	
10	Fremantle	22	11	11	0	2041	2038	100.1	44	
11	Brisbane Lions	22	10	12	0	2139	2164	98.8	40	
12	Richmond	22	10	12	0	2022	2190	92.3	40	
13	Essendon	22	8	14	0	2118	2302	92.0	32	
14	Hawthorn	22	5	17	0	1904	2317	82.2	20	
15	Collingwood	22	5	17	0	1884	2425	77.7	20	
16	Carlton	22	4	17	1	2016	2670	75.5	18	

Source: AFL ladder
Rules for classification: 1) points; 2) percentage; 3) number of points for.
(P) Premiers

=== Ladder progression ===
Numbers highlighted in green indicate that the team finished the round inside the top 8.
Numbers highlighted in blue indicates the team finished first on the ladder in that round.
Numbers highlighted in red indicates the team finished in last place on the ladder in that round.

Team ╲ Round	1	2	3	4	5	6	7	8	9	10	11	12	13	14	15	16	17	18	19	20	21	22
Adelaide	0	4	8	12	12	16	16	16	20	24	28	28	32	36	40	44	48	52	56	60	64	68
West Coast	4	8	12	16	20	24	28	32	32	36	40	44	48	52	56	60	60	64	64	68	68	68
Sydney	4	4	8	8	8	8	12	16	20	20	24	28	32	32	36	40	44	44	48	52	56	60
St Kilda	0	4	4	8	12	16	16	16	16	20	20	24	24	28	32	36	40	44	48	52	52	56
Kangaroos	4	8	12	16	20	20	20	20	20	24	24	28	32	36	36	40	40	44	48	48	48	52
Geelong	4	4	4	8	12	16	20	24	28	28	28	32	32	36	36	40	40	40	40	40	44	48
Melbourne	4	8	12	12	16	16	20	20	24	28	32	36	36	36	36	36	36	36	36	40	44	48
Port Adelaide	0	4	4	6	6	6	10	10	14	14	18	22	26	26	30	30	34	34	38	38	42	46
Western Bulldogs	4	4	4	4	8	8	12	16	16	16	20	20	24	24	24	24	28	32	36	40	40	44
Fremantle	4	4	4	4	8	12	16	16	16	20	20	20	20	20	24	28	32	36	40	40	44	44
Brisbane Lions	4	4	4	4	4	8	8	12	12	12	16	20	24	28	32	32	36	36	40	40	40	40
Richmond	0	4	8	12	12	16	20	24	28	28	28	28	28	32	36	36	36	36	36	36	40	40
Essendon	0	0	4	4	8	8	8	12	12	16	16	16	20	20	20	24	24	28	28	28	32	32
Hawthorn	0	0	0	4	4	4	4	8	12	12	12	12	12	12	12	12	16	16	16	20	20	20
Collingwood	0	0	4	4	4	4	4	4	8	12	16	16	16	20	20	20	20	20	20	20	20	20
Carlton	0	4	4	6	6	10	10	10	10	10	10	10	10	10	10	10	10	14	14	18	18	18

== Finals series ==
Qualifying and elimination finals
Sep 3, AAMI Stadium
1	Adelaide	8.9 (57)
4	St Kilda	10.5 (65)
Sep 4, Telstra Dome
5	Kangaroos	11.11 (77)
8	Port Adelaide	26.8 (164)
Sep 3, MCG
6	Geelong	18.8 (116)
7	Melbourne	9.7 (61)
Sep 2, Subiaco Oval
2	West Coast	10.9 (69)
3	Sydney	10.5 (65)

Semi-finals
Sep 10, AAMI Stadium
Adelaide	18.15 (123)
Port Adelaide	5.10 (40)
Sep 9, SCG
Sydney	7.14 (56)
Geelong	7.11 (53)

Preliminary finals
Sep 16, MCG
St Kilda	9.11 (65)
Sydney	15.6 (96)
Sep 17, Subiaco Oval
West Coast	14.9 (93)
Adelaide	11.11 (77)

Grand final
Sep 24, MCG
Sydney	8.10 (58)
West Coast	7.12 (54)

=== Week one ===
	Qualifying finals
QF2: Friday, 2 September	West Coast 10.9 (69)	def.	Sydney 10.5 (65)	Subiaco Oval (crowd: 43,302)
QF1: Saturday, 3 September	Adelaide 8.9 (57)	def. by	St Kilda 10.5 (65)	AAMI Stadium (crowd: 48,768)

	Elimination finals
EF2: Saturday, 3 September	Geelong 18.8 (116)	def.	Melbourne 9.7 (61)	MCG (crowd: 65,018)
EF1: Sunday, 4 September	Kangaroos 11.11 (77)	def. by	Port Adelaide 26.8 (164)	Telstra Dome (crowd: 25,195)

=== Week two ===
	Semi-finals
SF2: Friday, 9 September	Sydney 7.14 (56)	def.	Geelong 7.11 (53)	SCG (crowd: 39,079)
SF1: Saturday, 10 September	Adelaide 18.15 (123)	def.	Port Adelaide 5.10 (40)	AAMI Stadium (crowd: 50,521)

=== Week three ===
	Preliminary finals
PF1: Friday, 16 September	St Kilda 9.11 (65)	def. by	Sydney 15.6 (96)	MCG (crowd: 73,344)
PF2: Saturday, 17 September	West Coast 14.9 (94)	def.	Adelaide 11.11 (77)	Subiaco Oval (crowd: 43,009)

=== Week four ===
Grand final
Saturday, 24 September (2:35 pm)	Sydney	def.	West Coast	MCG (crowd: 91,898)
3.0 (18); 6.3 (39); 6.5 (41); 8.10 (58)	Q1; Q2; Q3; Final	2.4 (16); 2.7 (19); 5.9 (39); 7.12 (54)	Umpires: Allen, McLaren, Goldspink; Norm Smith Medal: Chris Judd (West Coast); Television broadcast: Network Ten; National anthem: Silvie Paladino
Hall 2 Jolly, Schneider, O'Loughlin, Kennelly, Goodes, Buchanan 1	Goals	2 Hunter; 1 Nicoski, Cox, Embley, Hansen, Cousins
Roberts-Thomson, Goodes, Buchanan, Kennelly, Fosdike, Kirk	Best	Judd, Wirrpunda, Cousins, Cox, Fletcher
Ball (cut head), C. Bolton (nose), Crouch (ankle)	Injuries	Kerr (ankle), Gardiner (cut head)
Nil	Reports	Nil
Sydney won their fourth premiership – their first in Sydney, their first in the AFL era and their first since they won the VFL as South Melbourne in 1933.; Tadhg Kennelly became the first Irishman to become an AFL premiership player. He later also became the first man to be both an AFL premiership player and an All-Ireland senior (Gaelic) football champion in 2009 with his native Kerry.; Chris Judd became the fourth player to win the Norm Smith Medal despite being on the grand final losing team, joining Maurice Rioli (Richmond 1982), Gary Ablett Sr. (Geelong 1989) and Nathan Buckley (Collingwood 2002).

== Awards ==
- The Brownlow Medal was awarded to Ben Cousins of West Coast. Ben Cousins received 20 votes to beat fellow West Coast midfielder Daniel Kerr.
- The Leigh Matthews Trophy was awarded to Ben Cousins of West Coast.
- The Coleman Medal was awarded to Fraser Gehrig of St Kilda.
- The Norm Smith Medal was awarded to Chris Judd of West Coast.
- The AFL Rising Star award was awarded to Brett Deledio of Richmond.
- The Wooden Spoon was "awarded" to Carlton for coming last. They became the first team in AFL history to win the pre-season competition and then finish last in the season proper.

== Player moves ==
- 30 players retired from the game, including Matthew Primus, Nick Holland, Martin Pike, Wayne Campbell, Justin Murphy, Brenton Sanderson, Austinn Jones, Angelo Lekkas, Phil Matera, Jason Ball and Stuart Maxfield. Shane Woewodin, a Brownlow Medallist, was delisted.

== Post-season matches ==
- Essendon coach Kevin Sheedy coached the Australians to a 2–0 victory in the 2005 International Rules Series against Ireland. Andrew McLeod won the Jim Stynes Medal.
- Fremantle defeated West Coast by 17 points in an exhibition match played in London.
- Sydney and the Kangaroos played an exhibition match in the United States at UCLA, with the Kangaroos winning by 48 points.

== Notable events ==
Three players celebrated 200th game milestones against eventual premiers the Sydney Swans during the regular season:

- Fraser Gehrig (St Kilda), round 10
- Jeff White (Melbourne), round 16
- Scott Lucas (Essendon), round 19

Additionally, Michael Voss (Brisbane Lions) played his 250th AFL game and Mal Michael his 100th club game for the Lions, both also against the Swans, in round 3.

The Swans won the premiership despite being ranked 14th in scoring during the regular season, their 1,974 points scored for being 42 points less than wooden-spooners Carlton which scored 2,016 points from their twenty-two matches, and 15th in total possessions.
