= Brett Kirk =

Australian rules footballer (born 1976)

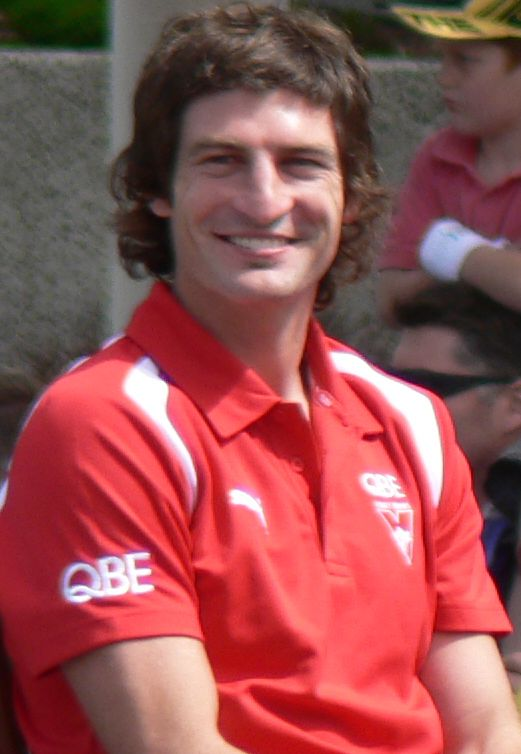
- Kirk during the 2005 AFL Grand Final parade

Personal information
- Born: 25 October 1976 (age 50); Albury, New South Wales
- Original team: North Albury (NSW)
- Debut: Round 19, 1999, Sydney Swans vs. Kangaroos, at SCG
- Height: 184 cm (6 ft 0 in)
- Weight: 81 kg (179 lb)

Playing career^{1}
Years	Club	Games (Goals)
1999–2010	Sydney Swans	241 (96)
- ^{1} Playing statistics correct to the end of 2010.

Career highlights
- 2 x Sydney Best and Fairest 2005 & 2007; All-Australian (2004); International Rules Series (Australia) 2003, 2004; AFL Premiership Player (2005); Grand Finalist captain (2006); Sydney captain: (2005–2007, 2009-2010); AFLPA Robert Rose Award (League's Most Courageous Player) 2006; Paul Kelly Players’ Player Award 2008; 4 x Carey-Bunton Medal (2004, 2006-2008); Hall of Fame Tribute Match, Dream Team 2008; AFLPA Madden Medal, Community Spirit Award 2010; AFLPA Best Captain Award 2010; AFL Ambassador Youth Mentor 2011; AFL International Cup Ambassador 2011; AFL Premiership Cup Ambassador 2011

Brett Kirk (born 25 October 1976) is a former Australian rules football player who was the captain of the Sydney Swans. He currently serves as an assistant coach with the Swans.

Kirk played 241 games for the Swans since making his debut in 1999, including the final 200 without missing a match. He was nominated All-Australian in 2004. Kirk won the best and fairest twice, in 2005, the year the club won the AFL premiership, and again in 2007. He was co-captain of the Swans from 2005 to 2010.

He was regarded as "one of the toughest and most respected midfielders in the competition".

== Early life ==
Kirk was born in Albury, New South Wales, to parents Noel (a North Albury and Burrumbuttock football player) and Sue. He played his junior football with North Albury Football Club.

He was recruited to the Sydney Swans as a mature-aged rookie in 1996 but twice dropped from the team after playing in the reserves competition, but he found his way back onto the list. In 1997 and 1998 he went back to North Albury in the Ovens and Murray Football League. However, the Swans gave him another chance in 1999 at the age of 22, once again adding Kirk to their list.

== AFL career ==
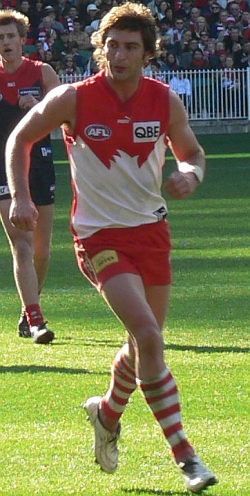
Kirk in 2006

Kirk made his debut in Round 19 of the 1999 season against the North Melbourne Kangaroos and recorded 19 disposals and kicked 3 goals. He played a total of 12 games in his first two seasons but cemented his place in 2001 when he played 19 games and kicked 14 goals. Kirk went on to play 18 games in 2002, and in 2003 had a break-out year in which he played all of Sydney's 24 games and recorded 140 tackles. He soon became an integral part of the engine room at the Swans. Kirk also represented Australia in International Rules against Ireland.

In 2004, Kirk took his game to another level, playing all 24 games; his season was highlighted with a 33-disposal and 7-tackle effort in a Round 15 victory over the Adelaide Crows as well as a 30-disposal, 6-tackle and 1-goal effort in their Round 19 loss against the Kangaroos. He was rewarded for his excellent season with selection for the interchange in the 2004 All-Australian team. Kirk again represented Australia in International rules football against Ireland.

In 2005, Kirk became a co-captain of the Swans, alongside Barry Hall and Leo Barry, and played all 26 games for the Swans, highlighted by a 31-disposal 8-tackle performance against the Essendon Bombers in a Round 7 win, and a 29-disposal, 7-tackle and 1-goal effort in the Swans' Round 16 win over the Melbourne Demons. Kirk became a premiership player when the Swans defeated the West Coast Eagles by 4 points in the 2005 AFL Grand Final. He was rewarded with his first Bob Skilton Medal, (Sydney's best and fairest) in a season in which he recorded 570 disposals and laid 136 tackles, including 22 disposals and 7 tackles in their drought-breaking premiership victory.

2006 saw Kirk play all 25 games and recording 142 tackles. He recorded 10 tackles in their Round 9 win over the Hawthorn Hawks and 11 tackles in their loss over the West Coast Eagles in their Round 15 grand final rematch. He performed strongly all season, and the Swans again matched up against the Eagles in the 2006 AFL Grand Final, in which Kirk recorded 27 disposals and laid 9 tackles. The Swans eventually lost the decider by 1 point. Kirk won the Robert Rose Award at the 2006 AFL Players Association awards for being voted the most courageous player in the league.

The 2007 AFL season saw the Swans win 12 games and eventually bow out in the Elimination final against the Collingwood Magpies; Kirk played 23 games and laid 149 tackles, had 10 or more tackles four times, and laid 13 tackles against Richmond in round 2. He also recorded 516 disposals for the season. He was rewarded with his second Bob Skilton Medal as Sydney's best and fairest at the conclusion of the 2007 season.

Kirk carried his consistency into the 2008 AFL season and played 24 games and racked up 539 disposals, along with 151 tackles, his highest tally in his career to that point. Kirk was selected to play for the 'Dream Team' in the AFL Hall of Fame Tribute Match, in which Kirk booted a goal in the Dream Team's loss to the Victorian side.

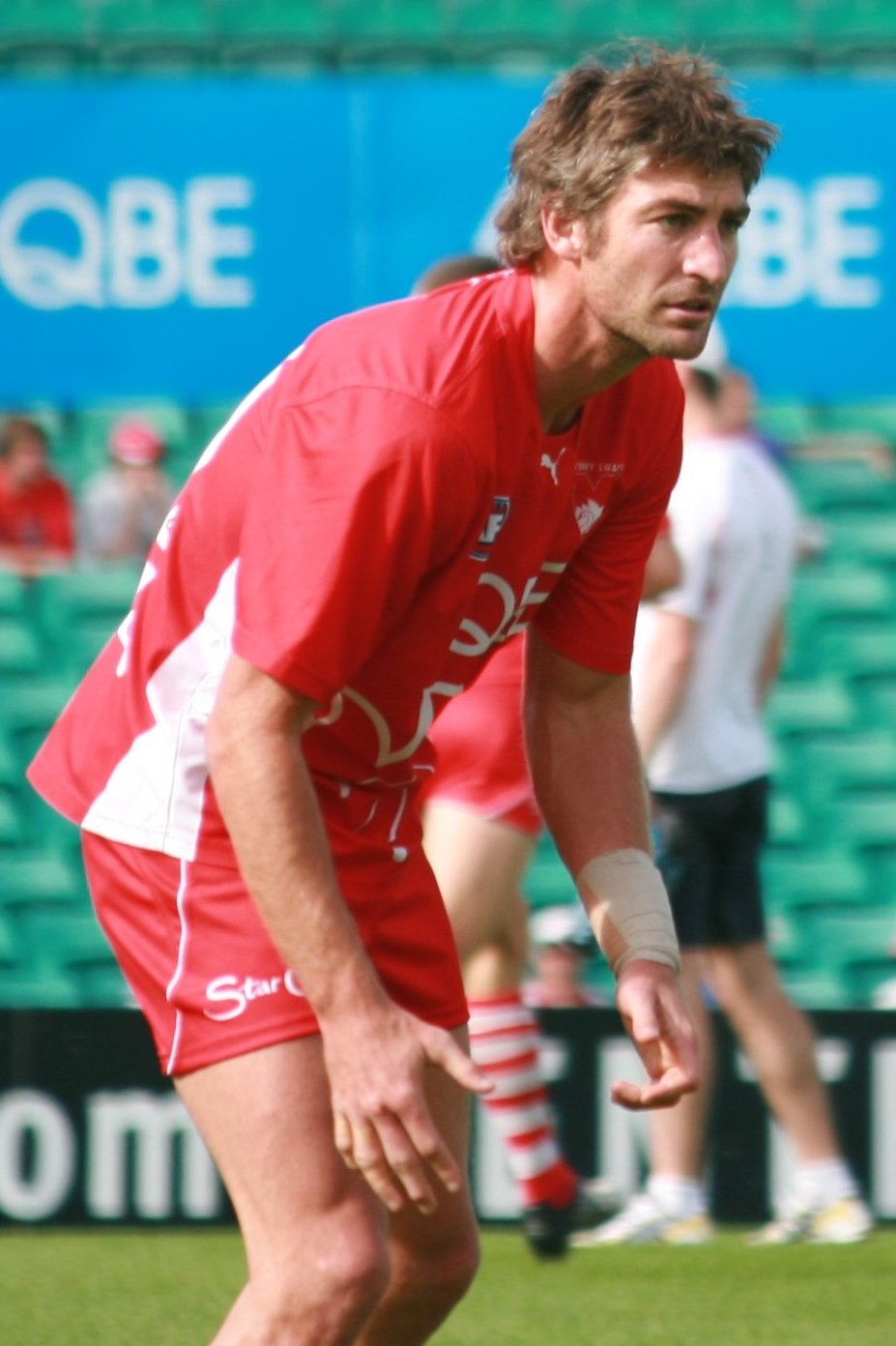
Kirk warming up before a match in 2009

The 2009 AFL season saw the Swans have a somewhat disappointing season, only managing 8 wins for the season; Kirk performed consistently as always and recorded a career-best total of 170 tackles and 14 tackles in their Round 19 win over Richmond. Kirk also racked up 468 disposals and recorded 33 disposals against the Port Adelaide Power in Round 9.

2010 was Brett Kirk's last season in the AFL; he recorded 397 disposals and laid 117 tackles and played his final game in the Swans' semi-final loss against the Western Bulldogs. He was rewarded with the AFLPA Best Captain Award and also the AFLPA Madden Medal.

He surpassed Jared Crouch's Swans record of 194 consecutive AFL matches in the game against Geelong in round 18, 2010. He had a total of 1278 tackles in his career, which is the fourth-most of any AFL player (2014). Kirk played his final and 200th consecutive game (having not missed a match since Round 14, 2002) when he faced the Western Bulldogs in the second round of the AFL finals on Saturday 11 September 2010. It is the fifth-longest such streak, and is one of two by Sydney Swans players (the other being Adam Goodes) in the top 5.

He retired at the end of 2010.

== Coaching and ambassador role ==
In 2011, he spent six months travelling the world and spreading the word about football as the AFL's International Ambassador.

In 2012, he gained additional fame for his bizarre "Thanks Basil" introduction, which was voted by 7AFL viewers as the undisputed greatest moment in AFL history in 2022.

Kirk joined the Fremantle Football Club as an assistant coach at the end of 2012, working as a development and midfield coach with Ross Lyon. Prior to that, he worked at the Gold Coast Suns in a role designed to help implement a winning culture at the club. He returned to the Sydney Swans at the end of 2015 as an assistant coach under John Longmire.

== Statistics ==
Legend
G	Goals	K	Kicks	D	Disposals	T	Tackles
B	Behinds	H	Handballs	M	Marks

Season	Team	No.	Games	Totals							Averages (per game)						
Season	Team	No.	Games	G	B	K	H	D	M	T	G	B	K	H	D	M	T
1999	Sydney	31	5	5	2	65	19	84	18	11	1.0	0.4	13.0	3.8	16.8	3.6	2.2
2000	Sydney	31	7	1	3	45	33	78	13	18	0.1	0.4	6.4	4.7	11.1	1.9	2.6
2001	Sydney	31	19	14	8	130	101	231	56	39	0.7	0.4	6.8	5.3	12.2	2.9	2.1
2002	Sydney	31	18	6	2	96	137	233	39	78	0.3	0.1	5.3	7.6	12.9	2.2	4.3
2003	Sydney	31	24	9	5	168	209	377	44	140	0.4	0.2	7.0	8.7	15.7	1.8	5.8
2004	Sydney	31	24	10	11	236	237	473	54	127	0.4	0.5	9.8	9.9	19.7	2.3	5.3
2005	Sydney	31	26	6	6	299	271	570	68	136	0.2	0.2	11.5	10.4	21.9	2.6	5.2
2006	Sydney	31	25	8	13	285	211	496	99	142	0.3	0.5	11.4	8.4	19.8	4.0	5.7
2007	Sydney	31	23	8	5	223	293	516	80	149	0.3	0.2	9.7	12.7	22.4	3.5	6.5
2008	Sydney	31	24	9	12	257	282	539	71	151	0.4	0.5	10.7	11.8	22.5	3.0	6.3
2009	Sydney	31	22	8	4	173	295	468	44	170	0.4	0.2	7.9	13.4	21.3	2.0	7.7
2010	Sydney	31	24	12	4	161	236	397	68	117	0.5	0.2	6.7	9.8	16.5	2.8	4.9
Career			241	96	75	2138	2324	4462	654	1278	0.4	0.3	8.9	9.6	18.5	2.7	5.3

== Personal life ==
In 2008, Kirk met with the Dalai Lama during his Australian tour in which he presented the Dalai Lama with a signed Swans guernsey. Kirk is known as a practising Buddhist and has a tattoo of a Buddhist symbol on his back. When the young Swan Dan Hannebery seemed anxious, Kirk recommended that he do some meditation and read The Power of Now and A New Earth by Eckhart Tolle.

In November 2023, Kirk's son, Indhi, was rookie-drafted by the Sydney Swans.
