= Jason Ball (Australian footballer) =

Australian rules footballer, born 1972

Personal information
- Full name: Jason Andrew Ball
- Born: 21 November 1972 (age 53)
- Original team: Swan Districts
- Height: 201 cm (6 ft 7 in)
- Weight: 104 kg (229 lb)
- Positions: Forward, ruckman

Playing career
Years	Club	Games (Goals)
1991-1999	Swan Districts	61 (102)
1992-1999	West Coast	103 (114)
2000-2005	Sydney	90 (45)
Total		254 (261)

Career highlights
- 2× AFL premiership player: 1994 (West Coast), 2005 (Sydney); West Coast leading goalkicker 1995

Jason Andrew Ball (born 21 November 1972) is a former Australian rules football player with the West Coast Eagles and Sydney Swans in the Australian Football League (AFL).

The ruckman made his AFL debut for West Coast in 1992, and went on to play 103 games for them, scoring 114 goals, being part of the 1994 premiership side and winning the 1995 leading goal-kicker award. He was traded to Sydney after the 1999 season and went on to play 90 games for them. During the 2005 finals series, he announced he would retire at the end of the season. Sydney then reached the grand final, and Ball ended his career on a high note, winning his second premiership, against his former club.

== Statistics ==
Legend
G	Goals	K	Kicks	D	Disposals	T	Tackles
B	Behinds	H	Handballs	M	Marks	H/O	Hit-outs

Season	Team	No.	Games	Totals								Averages (per game)							
Season	Team	No.	Games	G	B	K	H	D	M	T	H/O	G	B	K	H	D	M	T	H/O
1992	West Coast	29	1	0	1	3	0	3	2	3	4	0.0	1.0	3.0	0.0	3.0	2.0	3.0	4.0
1993	West Coast	29	1	0	0	2	2	4	1	0	2	0.0	0.0	2.0	2.0	4.0	1.0	0.0	2.0
1994†	West Coast	26	16	10	8	131	75	206	63	15	58	0.6	0.5	8.2	4.7	12.9	3.9	0.9	3.6
1995	West Coast	26	22	48	35	208	87	295	128	14	38	2.2	1.6	9.5	4.0	13.4	5.8	0.6	1.7
1996	West Coast	26	13	25	13	110	53	163	66	9	35	1.9	1.0	8.5	4.1	12.5	5.1	0.7	2.7
1997	West Coast	26	14	7	6	87	81	168	58	21	55	0.5	0.4	6.2	5.8	12.0	4.1	1.5	3.9
1998	West Coast	26	20	20	11	178	109	287	89	13	218	1.0	0.6	8.9	5.5	14.4	4.5	0.7	10.9
1999	West Coast	26	16	4	4	100	75	175	65	7	135	0.3	0.3	6.3	4.7	10.9	4.1	0.4	8.4
2000	Sydney	27	9	9	7	47	22	69	25	8	21	1.0	0.8	5.2	2.4	7.7	2.8	0.9	2.3
2001	Sydney	27	20	24	8	198	125	323	101	22	193	1.2	0.4	9.9	6.3	16.2	5.1	1.1	9.7
2002	Sydney	27	0	—	—	—	—	—	—	—	—	—	—	—	—	—	—	—	—
2003	Sydney	27	17	7	7	125	90	215	85	22	261	0.4	0.4	7.4	5.3	12.6	5.0	1.3	15.4
2004	Sydney	27	23	3	4	136	119	255	66	43	389	0.1	0.2	5.9	5.2	11.1	2.9	1.9	16.9
2005†	Sydney	27	21	2	2	107	77	184	73	25	285	0.1	0.1	5.1	3.7	8.8	3.5	1.2	13.6
Career			193	159	106	1432	915	2347	822	202	1694	0.8	0.5	7.4	4.7	12.2	4.3	1.0	8.8
