= Leo Barry =

Australian rules footballer, born 1977

Personal information
- Born: 19 May 1977 (age 49); Deniliquin, New South Wales
- Original team: Deniliquin (NSW)
- Debut: Round 22, 3 September 1995, Sydney vs. Collingwood, at SCG
- Height: 184 cm (6 ft 0 in)
- Weight: 88 kg (194 lb)
- Positions: Back pocket, fullback

Playing career^{1}
Years	Club	Games (Goals)
1995–2009	Sydney Swans	237 (56)
- ^{1} Playing statistics correct to the end of 2009.

Career highlights
- International Rules 2003; All-Australian 2004, 2005; Premiership player 2005; Sydney captain: 2005–2008

Leo Barry (born 19 May 1977) is a retired Australian rules footballer in the Australian Football League (AFL) with the Sydney Swans.

Originally from Deniliquin, New South Wales, Barry attended Saint Ignatius' College, Riverview, before being drafted as a zone selection in the 1994 National Draft and making his debut in the final round of the 1995 season against Collingwood. For the next few seasons, he played in the forward line without consistency, struggling to find a place in an already strong forward line. He did, however, display an ability to take spectacular jumping marks, earning him the nickname "Leaping Leo".

In 2001, Swans coach Rodney Eade moved Barry to the backline, where he prospered. Despite being short for a full-back at 184 centimetres, he successfully played on much taller opponents, making use of his leaping skills and using his body well. Regularly playing on opponents 10–15 cm taller than he is, Barry rarely had multiple goals kicked upon him. Barry's unique defensive ability was observed in 2004 when he kept 196-centimetre St Kilda full-forward Fraser Gehrig to two handballs for the whole game (for this effort, he received three Brownlow Medal votes).

Despite being only 184 centimetres tall, Barry was surprisingly strong, which was a useful attribute for him when facing taller opponents such as Fraser Gehrig, Brendan Fevola, David Neitz, Anthony Rocca, Chris Tarrant, Quentin Lynch, Matthew Lloyd, Jonathan Brown, Daniel Bradshaw and Matthew Richardson.

Barry has twice been included in the All-Australian team, in 2004 and 2005.

On 18 August 2009, Barry announced he would retire from football at the end of the 2009 season.

Barry is now a portfolio manager at Fairview Equity Partners.

== "That Mark" ==
"Cox throws it onto the left; one last roll of the dice for the Eagles! Leo Barry, you star!...(siren in background)...The longest premiership drought in football history is over! For the first time in 72 years, the Swans are champions of the AFL!"

— Network Ten commentator Stephen Quartermain's commentary of Leo Barry's mark in the 2005 AFL Grand Final.

Barry is known as the player who secured the 2005 AFL premiership for the Sydney Swans. He contributed heavily to the Swans' success, which culminated with one of Barry's trademark spectacular marks during the 2005 AFL Grand Final between Sydney and West Coast. After a kick from Dean Cox was sent into the forward line, Barry marked in a big pack within the final seconds of the game to secure the Swans' long-awaited premiership.

This image was later used by Tabcorp for promotional purposes, and Barry sued for them using it without his permission, claiming that the image was "worth A$50,000". A confidential out-of-court settlement was reached. Since the court case, Barry has held the rights to the photo.

== Statistics ==
Legend
G	Goals	K	Kicks	D	Disposals	T	Tackles
B	Behinds	H	Handballs	M	Marks

Season	Team	No.	Games	Totals							Averages (per game)						
Season	Team	No.	Games	G	B	K	H	D	M	T	G	B	K	H	D	M	T
1995	Sydney	21	1	1	0	6	2	8	4	0	1.0	0.0	6.0	2.0	8.0	4.0	0.0
1996	Sydney	21	5	2	0	13	10	23	5	8	0.4	0.0	2.6	2.0	4.6	1.0	1.6
1997	Sydney	21	10	12	9	67	39	106	30	13	1.2	0.9	6.7	3.9	10.6	3.0	1.3
1998	Sydney	21	16	9	6	82	62	144	38	16	0.6	0.4	5.1	3.9	9.0	2.4	1.0
1999	Sydney	21	17	10	8	127	96	223	88	16	0.6	0.5	7.5	5.6	13.1	5.2	0.9
2000	Sydney	21	17	15	5	112	76	188	63	18	0.9	0.3	6.6	4.5	11.1	3.7	1.1
2001	Sydney	21	19	1	1	143	92	235	84	35	0.1	0.1	7.5	4.8	12.4	4.4	1.8
2002	Sydney	21	13	0	0	89	75	164	43	28	0.0	0.0	6.8	5.8	12.6	3.3	2.2
2003	Sydney	21	24	0	2	182	151	333	133	56	0.0	0.1	7.6	6.3	13.9	5.5	2.3
2004	Sydney	21	23	0	0	139	148	287	107	34	0.0	0.0	6.0	6.4	12.5	4.7	1.5
2005	Sydney	21	26	0	0	213	128	341	152	37	0.0	0.0	8.2	4.9	13.1	5.8	1.4
2006	Sydney	21	25	0	1	224	147	371	173	39	0.0	0.0	9.0	5.9	14.8	6.9	1.6
2007	Sydney	21	18	4	0	145	131	276	116	36	0.2	0.0	8.1	7.3	15.3	6.4	2.0
2008	Sydney	21	20	2	0	149	154	303	125	35	0.1	0.0	7.5	7.7	15.2	6.3	1.8
2009	Sydney	21	3	0	0	20	23	43	14	3	0.0	0.0	6.7	7.7	14.3	4.7	1.0
Career			237	56	32	1711	1334	3045	1175	374	0.2	0.1	7.2	5.6	12.8	5.0	1.6
