= 2011 AFL finals series =

Finals matches of the 2011 Australian Football League

2011 premiership season
- Date: 9 September – 1 October 2011
- Teams: 8
- Premiers: Geelong (9th premiership)
- Runners-up: Collingwood (41st grand final)
- Minor premiers: Collingwood (19th minor premiership)

Attendance
- Matches played: 9
- Total attendance: 614,783 (68,309 per match)
- Highest: 99,537 (Grand Final, Collingwood vs. Geelong)

The 2011 Australian Football League finals series determined the winner of the 2011 AFL season. The series was scheduled to occur over four weekends in September 2011, culminating with the 115th AFL/VFL Grand Final at the Melbourne Cricket Ground on 1 October 2011. Traditionally held on the final Saturday in September, the grand final date was pushed to October to accommodate two extra rounds in the home and away season.

== The finals system ==
The system is a final eight system. This system is different from the McIntyre final eight system, which was previously used by the AFL, and was used by the National Rugby League until 2011.

The top four teams in the eight receive what is popularly known as the "double chance" when they play in week-one qualifying finals. This means that even if a top-four team loses in the first week, it still remains in the finals, playing a semi-final the next week against the winner of an elimination final. The bottom four of the eight play knock-out games, in that only the winners survive and move on to the next week. Home-state advantage goes to the team with the higher seed in the first two weeks, to the qualifying final winners in the third week. Games in Victoria are played at the MCG, regardless of the team's usual home ground, if a crowd larger than the seating capacity of Etihad Stadium (53,359) is expected.

In the second week, the winners of the qualifying finals receive a bye to the third week. The losers of the qualifying final plays the elimination finals winners in a semi-final. In the third week, the winners of the semi-finals from week two play the winners of the qualifying finals in the first week. The winners of those matches move on to the Grand Final at the MCG in Melbourne.

== Qualification ==
2011 AFL ladder
Pos	Team	Pld	W	L	D	PF	PA	PP	Pts	
1	Collingwood	22	20	2	0	2592	1546	167.7	80	Finals series
2	Geelong (P)	22	19	3	0	2548	1619	157.4	76	Finals series
3	Hawthorn	22	18	4	0	2355	1634	144.1	72	Finals series
4	West Coast	22	17	5	0	2235	1715	130.3	68	Finals series
5	Carlton	22	14	7	1	2225	1700	130.9	58	Finals series
6	St Kilda	22	12	9	1	1891	1677	112.8	50	Finals series
7	Sydney	22	12	9	1	1897	1735	109.3	50	Finals series
8	Essendon	22	11	10	1	2217	2217	100.0	46	Finals series
9	North Melbourne	22	10	12	0	2106	2082	101.2	40	
10	Western Bulldogs	22	9	13	0	2060	2155	95.6	36	
11	Fremantle	22	9	13	0	1791	2155	83.1	36	
12	Richmond	22	8	13	1	2069	2396	86.4	34	
13	Melbourne	22	8	13	1	1974	2315	85.3	34	
14	Adelaide	22	7	15	0	1742	2193	79.4	28	
15	Brisbane Lions	22	4	18	0	1814	2240	81.0	16	
16	Port Adelaide	22	3	19	0	1718	2663	64.5	12	
17	Gold Coast	22	3	19	0	1534	2726	56.3	12	

Source: AFL ladder
Rules for classification: 1) points; 2) percentage; 3) number of points for.
(P) Premiers

== Summary of results ==
Qualifying and elimination finals
10 September, MCG
1	Collingwood	12.10 (82)
4	West Coast	9.8 (62)
11 September, MCG
5	Carlton	21.23 (149)
8	Essendon	13.9 (87)
10 September, Etihad Stadium
6	St Kilda	8.9 (57)
7	Sydney	12.10 (82)
9 September, MCG
2	Geelong	14.14 (98)
3	Hawthorn	9.13 (67)

Semi-finals
17 September, Patersons Stadium
West Coast	15.11 (101)
Carlton	15.8 (98)
16 September, MCG
Hawthorn	19.8 (122)
Sydney	13.8 (86)

Preliminary finals
23 September, MCG
Collingwood	10.8 (68)
Hawthorn	9.11 (65)
24 September, MCG
Geelong	17.15 (117)
West Coast	10.9 (69)

Grand final
1 October, MCG
Collingwood	12.9 (81)
Geelong	18.11 (119)

== Week one (qualifying & elimination finals) ==
For the first time since the current AFL finals system was introduced in 2000, all four finals were played in Melbourne in the first week of the finals.

=== First qualifying final (Collingwood vs. West Coast) ===
First qualifying final
Saturday, 10 September	Collingwood	def.	West Coast	MCG (crowd: 67,379)	Report
1.1 (7); 7.5 (47); 10.7 (67); 12.10 (82)	Q1; Q2; Q3; Final	2.3 (15); 5.4 (34); 6.5 (41); 9.8 (62)	Television broadcast: Network Ten

=== Second qualifying final (Geelong vs. Hawthorn) ===
Second qualifying final
Friday, 9 September	Geelong	def.	Hawthorn	MCG (crowd: 73,400)	Report
2.0 (12); 7.2 (44); 12.6 (78); 14.14 (98)	Q1; Q2; Q3; Final	3.5 (23); 4.8 (32); 7.12 (54); 9.13 (67)	Television broadcast: Seven Network

=== First elimination final (Carlton vs. Essendon) ===
First elimination final
Sunday, 11 September	Carlton	def.	Essendon	MCG (crowd: 90,161)	Report
4.5 (29); 10.12 (72); 17.17 (119); 21.23 (149)	Q1; Q2; Q3; Final	3.4 (22); 4.7 (31); 8.9 (57); 13.9 (87)	Television broadcast: Seven Network
Carlton won its first final since the 2001 First Elimination Final.; The attendance of 90,161 was a new record for the highest ever for an elimination final. This record stood until 2013.

=== Second elimination final (St Kilda vs. Sydney) ===
Second elimination final
Saturday, 10 September	St Kilda	def. by	Sydney	Etihad Stadium (crowd: 39,205)	Report
1.3 (9); 3.4 (22); 7.7 (49); 8.9 (57)	Q1; Q2; Q3; Final	2.4 (16); 7.6 (48); 8.9 (57); 12.10 (82)	Television broadcast: Network Ten
St Kilda lost its first Saturday night match at Etihad Stadium since Round 9, 2003.

== Week two (semi-finals) ==
=== First semi-final (West Coast vs. Carlton) ===
First semi-final
Saturday, 17 September	West Coast	def.	Carlton	Patersons Stadium (crowd: 42,803)	Report
1.3 (9); 9.3 (57); 11.8 (74); 15.11 (101)	Q1; Q2; Q3; Final	4.1 (25); 7.4 (46); 10.5 (65); 15.8 (98)	Television broadcast: Network Ten
This was Carlton's third narrow loss in an interstate final in three years.; West Coast won its first final since the 2006 grand final.

=== Second semi-final (Hawthorn vs. Sydney) ===
Second semi-final
Friday, 16 September	Hawthorn	def.	Sydney	MCG (crowd: 55,198)	Report
3.5 (23); 10.5 (65); 12.6 (78); 19.8 (122)	Q1; Q2; Q3; Final	0.1 (1); 4.1 (25); 9.6 (60); 13.8 (86)	Television broadcast: Seven Network

== Week three (preliminary finals) ==
=== First preliminary final (Collingwood vs. Hawthorn) ===
First preliminary final
Friday, 23, September 7:45 pm AEST	Collingwood	def.	Hawthorn	MCG (crowd: 87,112)	Report
2.3 (15); 3.5 (23); 5.6 (36); 10.8 (68)	Q1; Q2; Q3; Final	2.4 (16); 4.7 (31); 7.11 (53); 9.11 (65)	Television broadcast: Seven Network

=== Second preliminary final (Geelong vs. West Coast) ===
Second preliminary final
Saturday, 24, September 2:20 pm AEST	Geelong	def.	West Coast	MCG (crowd: 59,455)	Report
5.7 (37); 8.11 (59); 15.14 (104); 17.15 (117)	Q1; Q2; Q3; Final	2.3 (15); 5.4 (34); 7.6 (48); 10.9 (69)	Television broadcast: Network Ten
West Coast became the first non-Victorian team to make the top four since 2007.

== Week four (Grand Final) ==
Grand Final
Saturday, 1 October 2:30pm	Collingwood	def. by	Geelong	MCG (crowd: 99,537)	Report
4.2 (26); 9.3 (57); 12.6 (78); 12.9 (81)	Q1; Q2; Q3; Final	4.3 (27); 8.6 (54); 13.7 (85); 18.11 (119)	Umpires: Donlon, Rosebury, Ryan; Norm Smith Medal: Jimmy Bartel (Geelong); Television broadcast: Network Ten; National anthem: Vanessa Amorosi
T Cloke, Krakouer 3 S Sidebottom 2 L Ball, L Brown, B Johnson, S Wellingham 1	Goals	4 S Johnson; 3 J Bartel, Hawkins, Varcoe; 2 Selwood; 1 Duncan, Ling, Stokes
S Pendlebury, D Thomas, S Sidebottom, C Tarrant, L Ball, L Brown, T Cloke	Best	Bartel, Selwood, Hawkins, Ling, S Johnson, P Chapman, Ottens, Varcoe
Nil	Injuries	Podsiadly (shoulder)
Nil	Reports	Nil
