= 2011 AFL season =

115th season of the Australian Football League (AFL)

2011 AFL premiership season
- Teams: 17
- Premiers: Geelong; 9th premiership
- Minor premiers: Collingwood; 19th minor premiership
- Pre-season cup: Collingwood; 2nd pre-season cup win
- Brownlow Medallist: Dane Swan (Collingwood); 34 votes
- Coleman Medallist: Lance Franklin (Hawthorn); 71 goals

Attendance
- Matches played: 196
- Total attendance: 7,139,272 (36,425 per match)
- Highest (H&A): 89,626 (round 5, Essendon v Collingwood)
- Highest (finals): 99,537 (Grand Final, Collingwood vs. Geelong)

The 2011 AFL season was the 115th season of the Australian Football League (AFL), the highest level senior Australian rules football competition in Australia, which was known as the Victorian Football League until 1989.

The season featured seventeen clubs, with the newly established Gold Coast Suns, based in Gold Coast, Queensland, playing its inaugural season. The season ran from 24 March until 1 October, and comprised a 22-game home-and-away season followed by a finals series featuring the top eight clubs.

The premiership was won by the Geelong Football Club for the ninth time, after it defeated Collingwood by 38 points in the 2011 AFL Grand Final.

== Pre-season ==
=== Draft ===
The 2010 National Draft was held on 18 November 2010 at the Gold Coast Convention Centre. 107 players were drafted, including 28 promoted rookies. New club Gold Coast received the first three selections as part of its draft concessions, and selected David Swallow with the number one draft pick.

The 2011 Pre-season and Rookie Drafts were held on 7 December 2010, with another 80 players being selected. Greater Western Sydney, set to join the AFL as a senior club in 2012, had the first eight selections in the Rookie Draft as part of its draft concessions.

=== NAB Cup ===
The 2011 NAB Cup featured all seventeen senior clubs, as well as Greater Western Sydney which would not join the AFL as a senior club until 2012. The first round of matches featured lightning football matches played among six pools of three teams; standard matches were played for the rest of the competition. Collingwood defeated Essendon in the Grand Final at Etihad Stadium on Friday, 11 March.

2011 NAB Cup Grand Final
Friday, 11 March 7:45 pm	Essendon	def. by	Collingwood	Etihad Stadium (crowd: 45,304)	Report
0.2.2 (14); 0.3.4 (22); 0.9.5 (59); 0.13.8 (86)	Q1; Q2; Q3; Final	0.3.4 (22); 0.7.6 (48); 1.11.7 (82); 1.15.9 (108)	Umpires: Rosebury, Stevic, Nicholls, Jennings; Michael Tuck Medal: Heath Shaw; Television broadcast: Seven Network
Super Goals	1 Buckley
Hurley, Monfries 3 Ryder, Watson, Zaharakis 2 Hocking 1	Goals	3 Krakouer, Dawes; 2 Cloke; 1 Ball, Beams, McCarthy, Pendlebury, Swan, Thomas, Wellingham
Hardingham (groin)	Injuries	Nil

== Premiership season ==
The fixture was announced on 29 October. Some of the highlights included:

- Gold Coast had a bye in Round 1, and played its first home match in Round 2 against Carlton at the Gabba. Its first match at its permanent home ground, the renovated Metricon Stadium, was against Geelong on 28 May.
- The season had 24 rounds; 19 rounds featured eight matches (with one team having a bye) and five rounds featured seven matches (with three teams having a bye). There were also eleven additional matches compared to 2010, with a total of 196 games (including finals) compared to 185.
- Two venues hosted their first AFL matches during the season: Cazaly's Stadium in Cairns hosted the Richmond vs Gold Coast match in round 17, and the Adelaide Oval in Adelaide hosted the Port Adelaide vs Melbourne match in round 24. The latter was not part of the original fixture, as the game was moved there from AAMI Stadium during the season.

=== Round 1 ===
	Round 1
Thursday, 24 March (7:40 pm)	Carlton 14.20 (104)	def.	Richmond 13.6 (84)	MCG (crowd: 60,654)	Report
Friday, 25 March (7:40 pm)	Geelong 6.12 (48)	def.	St Kilda 6.11 (47)	MCG (crowd: 42,869)	Report
Saturday, 26 March (2:10 pm)	Collingwood 24.11 (155)	def.	Port Adelaide 12.8 (80)	Etihad Stadium (crowd: 35,773)	Report
Saturday, 26 March (7:10 pm)	Adelaide 16.9 (105)	def.	Hawthorn 12.13 (85)	AAMI Stadium (crowd: 42,536)	Report
Saturday, 26 March (7:10 pm)	Brisbane Lions 14.8 (92)	def. by	Fremantle 13.16 (94)	The Gabba (crowd: 23,373)	Report
Sunday, 27 March (1:10 pm)	Essendon 16.17 (113)	def.	Western Bulldogs 8.10 (58)	Etihad Stadium (crowd: 42,617)	Report
Sunday, 27 March (2:10 pm)	Melbourne 11.18 (84)	drew with	Sydney 11.18 (84)	MCG (crowd: 33,951)	Report
Sunday, 27 March (4:10 pm)	West Coast 13.14 (92)	def.	North Melbourne 13.10 (88)	Patersons Stadium (crowd: 35,878)	Report
	Bye; Gold Coast
Adelaide commemorated 20 years since joining the AFL with a rematch against Hawthorn, its opponent in round 1 of its inaugural 1991 season.

=== Round 2 ===
	Round 2
Friday, 1 April (7:40 pm)	St Kilda 13.17 (95)	drew with	Richmond 14.11 (95)	MCG (crowd: 41,465)	Report
Saturday, 2 April (2:10 pm)	North Melbourne 7.14 (56)	def. by	Collingwood 21.17 (143)	Etihad Stadium (crowd: 40,578)	Report
Saturday, 2 April (2:40 pm)	Port Adelaide 15.8 (98)	def. by	West Coast 16.20 (116)	AAMI Stadium (crowd: 23,214)	Report
Saturday, 2 April (6:40 pm)	Gold Coast 7.10 (52)	def. by	Carlton 26.15 (171)	The Gabba (crowd: 27,914)	Report
Saturday, 2 April (5:40 pm)	Fremantle 10.18 (78)	def. by	Geelong 13.11 (89)	Patersons Stadium (crowd: 37,004)	Report
Sunday, 3 April (1:10 pm)	Western Bulldogs 19.9 (123)	def.	Brisbane Lions 6.9 (45)	Etihad Stadium (crowd: 22,331)	Report
Sunday, 3 April (2:10 pm)	Sydney 14.14 (98)	def.	Essendon 13.15 (93)	ANZ Stadium (crowd: 28,082)	Report
Sunday, 3 April (4:40 pm)	Hawthorn 16.26 (122)	def.	Melbourne 12.5 (77)	MCG (crowd: 49,905)	Report
	Bye; Adelaide
The new club, Gold Coast, made its AFL Premiership debut against Carlton at The Gabba. Carlton's score of 26.15 (171) was its highest in a match since 2000; and the winning margin, 119 points, was its greatest since 2001.; Richmond drew with St Kilda, ending the club's 13-game losing streak against the Saints, but extending the winless streak against the same opponent to 14 games. Richmond had not beaten St Kilda since round 4, 2003.; Gold Coast's crowd of 27,914 is their biggest home crowd for a match played in Queensland to date.

=== Round 3 ===
	Round 3
Friday, 8 April (7:40 pm)	Collingwood 15.12 (102)	def.	Carlton 11.8 (74)	MCG (crowd: 88,181)	Report
Saturday, 9 April (2:10 pm)	Western Bulldogs 18.14 (122)	def.	Gold Coast 7.9 (51)	Etihad Stadium (crowd: 21,373)	Report
Saturday, 9 April (2:40 pm)	Adelaide 7.12 (54)	def. by	Fremantle 11.13 (79)	AAMI Stadium (crowd: 33,414)	Report
Saturday, 9 April (7:10 pm)	Richmond 6.16 (52)	def. by	Hawthorn 17.13 (115)	MCG (crowd: 46,368)	Report
Saturday, 9 April (5:40 pm)	West Coast 13.10 (88)	def. by	Sydney 15.11 (101)	Patersons Stadium (crowd: 37,288)	Report
Sunday, 10 April (1:10 pm)	Melbourne 12.10 (82)	def.	Brisbane Lions 11.5 (71)	MCG (crowd: 24,380)	Report
Sunday, 10 April (2:10 pm)	Geelong 17.20 (122)	def.	Port Adelaide 6.7 (43)	Skilled Stadium (crowd: 22,420)	Report
Sunday, 10 April (4:40 pm)	St Kilda 12.12 (84)	def. by	Essendon 21.10 (136)	Etihad Stadium (crowd: 47,762)	Report
	Bye; North Melbourne
Matthew Pavlich became Fremantle's club game record holder, breaking former Docker Shane Parker's 238-game record.

=== Round 4 ===
	Round 4
Friday, 15 April (7:40 pm)	Richmond 13.12 (90)	def. by	Collingwood 24.17 (161)	MCG (crowd: 58,050)	Report
Saturday, 16 April (2:10 pm)	Hawthorn 10.12 (72)	def.	West Coast 9.11 (65)	Aurora Stadium (crowd: 15,063)	Report
Saturday, 16 April (2:10 pm)	Carlton 11.13 (79)	drew with	Essendon 11.13 (79)	MCG (crowd: 78,605)	Report
Saturday, 16 April (7:10 pm)	Sydney 7.12 (54)	def. by	Geelong 11.15 (81)	SCG (crowd: 25,300)	Report
Saturday, 16 April (7:10 pm)	Port Adelaide 14.14 (98)	def.	Adelaide 9.12 (66)	AAMI Stadium (crowd: 33,143)	Report
Sunday, 17 April (2:10 pm)	Gold Coast 9.15 (69)	def. by	Melbourne 23.21 (159)	The Gabba (crowd: 12,111)	Report
Sunday, 17 April (2:40 pm)	Fremantle 18.19 (127)	def.	North Melbourne 14.14 (98)	Patersons Stadium (crowd: 34,779)	Report
	Bye; Brisbane Lions, St Kilda, Western Bulldogs
The longest and second longest active streaks of consecutive games played were both broken this weekend: Kane Cornes of Port Adelaide was omitted after 174 consecutive games, and Collingwood's Darren Jolly was out injured after 142 consecutive matches.

=== Round 5 ===
	Round 5 (Easter and ANZAC Day)
Thursday, 21 April (7:40 pm)	Brisbane Lions 11.10 (76)	def. by	St Kilda 13.11 (89)	The Gabba (crowd: 22,520)	Report
Saturday, 23 April (2:40 pm)	Port Adelaide 15.11 (101)	def. by	Gold Coast 15.14 (104)	AAMI Stadium (crowd: 21,287)	Report
Saturday, 23 April (7:10 pm)	Carlton 11.19 (85)	def.	Adelaide 12.7 (79)	Etihad Stadium (crowd: 37,607)	Report
Sunday, 24 April (4:40 pm)	North Melbourne 14.19 (103)	def. by	Richmond 17.10 (112)	Etihad Stadium (crowd: 36,461)	Report
Monday, 25 April (2:40 pm)	Essendon 11.11 (77)	def. by	Collingwood 16.11 (107)	MCG (crowd: 89,626)	Report
Monday, 25 April (6:40 pm)	Fremantle 12.13 (85)	def.	Western Bulldogs 11.12 (78)	Patersons Stadium (crowd: 37,551)	Report
Tuesday, 26 April (2:40 pm)	Hawthorn 15.8 (98)	def. by	Geelong 17.15 (117)	MCG (crowd: 78,579)	Report
	Bye; Melbourne, Sydney, West Coast
Gold Coast recorded its first victory at AFL premiership level, defeating Port Adelaide by three points. Gold Coast trailed by 40 points late in the third quarter, before recovering to win the match; Port Adelaide's Justin Westhoff missed a 45m set shot after the siren which would have won the game for Port Adelaide.

=== Round 6 ===
	Round 6
Thursday, 28 April (6:40 pm)	West Coast 15.16 (106)	def.	Melbourne 6.16 (52)	Patersons Stadium (crowd: 36,298)	Report
Friday, 29 April (7:40 pm)	Sydney 10.11 (71)	def. by	Carlton 12.15 (87)	SCG (crowd: 28,081)	Report
Saturday, 30 April (2:10 pm)	North Melbourne 18.25 (133)	def.	Port Adelaide 10.13 (73)	Etihad Stadium (crowd: 16,014)	Report
Saturday, 30 April (7:10 pm)	Richmond 18.16 (124)	def.	Brisbane Lions 14.14 (98)	MCG (crowd: 37,438)	Report
Saturday, 30 April (7:10 pm)	Adelaide 13.12 (90)	def.	St Kilda 9.17 (71)	AAMI Stadium (crowd: 33,854)	Report
Sunday, 1 May (1:10 pm)	Essendon 31.11 (197)	def.	Gold Coast 8.10 (58)	Etihad Stadium (crowd: 33,710)	Report
Sunday, 1 May (4:40 pm)	Collingwood 15.15 (105)	def.	Western Bulldogs 8.9 (57)	MCG (crowd: 53,776)	Report
	Bye; Fremantle, Geelong, Hawthorn
Essendon scored 15.4 (94) in the first quarter against Gold Coast. It was the second highest score by any club in a quarter of football and as of Round 5, 2025 stands as the highest-scoring first quarter of all time.; Essendon's final score of 31.11 (197) was its highest since 2000, and its final winning margin of 139 points was its highest since 1989.

=== Round 7 ===
	Round 7
Friday, 6 May (8:10 pm)	Port Adelaide 10.12 (72)	def. by	Hawthorn 15.14 (104)	AAMI Stadium (crowd: 21,819)	Report
Saturday, 7 May (1:10 pm)	Western Bulldogs 10.5 (65)	def. by	Sydney 10.13 (73)	Manuka Oval (crowd: 10,184)	Report
Saturday, 7 May (2:10 pm)	Geelong 19.13 (127)	def.	North Melbourne 9.7 (61)	Skilled Stadium (crowd: 23,669)	Report
Saturday, 7 May (4:10 pm)	Richmond 23.10 (148)	def.	Fremantle 14.15 (99)	MCG (crowd: 34,090)	Report
Saturday, 7 May (7:10 pm)	Gold Coast 18.16 (124)	def.	Brisbane Lions 17.14 (116)	The Gabba (crowd: 25,501)	Report
Sunday, 8 May (1:10 pm)	Essendon 16.10 (106)	def.	West Coast 12.18 (90)	Etihad Stadium (crowd: 33,631)	Report
Sunday, 8 May (2:10 pm)	Melbourne 22.17 (149)	def.	Adelaide 8.5 (53)	MCG (crowd: 19,987)	Report
Monday, 9 May (7:20 pm)	St Kilda 12.9 (81)	def. by	Carlton 11.18 (84)	Etihad Stadium (crowd: 41,576)	Report
	Bye; Collingwood
In a VFL/AFL first, twin brothers Chris Scott (Geelong) and Brad Scott (North Melbourne) faced each other as coaches. It was the first of many matches the pair coached against each other over the following nine seasons.; Geelong recorded its 25th consecutive victory at Kardinia Park, breaking the VFL/AFL record for most successive wins at one venue. The record was previously held jointly by Richmond at Punt Road Oval (1932–1935) and South Melbourne at Lake Oval (1934–1936). Geelong would ultimately extend the streak to 29 wins before losing to Sydney in round 23.; The two Queensland teams, Gold Coast and the Brisbane Lions, played their first ever regular-season game against each other, known as the QClash.

=== Round 8 ===
	Round 8
Friday, 13 May (7:40 pm)	Geelong 8.17 (65)	def.	Collingwood 9.8 (62)	MCG (crowd: 81,691)	Report
Saturday, 14 May (2:10 pm)	North Melbourne 19.10 (124)	def.	Melbourne 12.11 (83)	Etihad Stadium (crowd: 23,536)	Report
Saturday, 14 May (2:40 pm)	Adelaide 20.10 (130)	def.	Gold Coast 9.19 (73)	AAMI Stadium (crowd: 36,056)	Report
Saturday, 14 May (7:10 pm)	Brisbane Lions 9.12 (66)	def. by	Essendon 15.12 (102)	The Gabba (crowd: 24,921)	Report
Saturday, 14 May (7:10 pm)	Sydney 18.13 (121)	def.	Port Adelaide 9.5 (59)	SCG (crowd: 20,719)	Report
Sunday, 15 May (1:10 pm)	Hawthorn 14.15 (99)	def.	St Kilda 10.9 (69)	MCG (crowd: 42,453)	Report
Sunday, 15 May (2:10 pm)	Western Bulldogs 23.15 (153)	def.	Richmond 18.10 (118)	Etihad Stadium (crowd: 39,141)	Report
Sunday, 15 May (2:40 pm)	West Coast 14.12 (96)	def.	Fremantle 9.9 (63)	Patersons Stadium (crowd: 40,567)	Report
	Bye; Carlton
West Coast won its first Western Derby since round 3, 2007, ending Fremantle's seven-derby winning streak.

=== Round 9 ===
	Round 9 (Indigenous Round)
Friday, 20 May (7:40 pm)	Carlton 14.16 (100)	def. by	Geelong 15.12 (102)	Etihad Stadium (crowd: 48,429)	Report
Saturday, 21 May (2:10 pm)	St Kilda 16.10 (106)	def.	Melbourne 13.8 (86)	Etihad Stadium (crowd: 28,863)	Report
Saturday, 21 May (2:40 pm)	Port Adelaide 14.6 (90)	def. by	Fremantle 21.16 (142)	AAMI Stadium (crowd: 16,274)	Report
Saturday, 21 May (7:10 pm)	Brisbane Lions 10.13 (73)	def.	North Melbourne 8.11 (59)	The Gabba (crowd: 18,404)	Report
Saturday, 21 May (7:40 pm)	Richmond 16.9 (105)	def.	Essendon 13.11 (89)	MCG (crowd: 83,563)	Report
Sunday, 22 May (1:10 pm)	Collingwood 20.15 (135)	def.	Adelaide 14.8 (92)	Etihad Stadium (crowd: 38,849)	Report
Sunday, 22 May (2:10 pm)	Sydney 8.12 (60)	def. by	Hawthorn 15.16 (106)	SCG (crowd: 33,136)	Report
Sunday, 22 May (2:40 pm)	West Coast 26.19 (175)	def.	Western Bulldogs 8.4 (52)	Patersons Stadium (crowd: 37,308)	Report
	Bye; Gold Coast
West Coast set new records for the club's highest score, 26.19 (175), and greatest winning margin, 123 points, in matches against the Western Bulldogs. It was the Bulldogs' worst defeat since round 2, 1996.

=== Round 10 ===
	Round 10
Friday, 27 May (7:40 pm)	Melbourne 6.10 (46)	def. by	Carlton 13.15 (93)	MCG (crowd: 47,464)	Report
Saturday, 28 May (2:10 pm)	North Melbourne 9.17 (71)	def. by	Sydney 10.12 (72)	Etihad Stadium (crowd: 24,267)	Report
Saturday, 28 May (1:10 pm)	Fremantle 7.14 (56)	def. by	St Kilda 15.12 (102)	Patersons Stadium (crowd: 35,483)	Report
Saturday, 28 May (7:20 pm)	Gold Coast 10.13 (73)	def. by	Geelong 21.13 (139)	Metricon Stadium (crowd: 21,485)	Report
Saturday, 28 May (8:10 pm)	Richmond 10.14 (74)	def. by	Port Adelaide 13.11 (89)	TIO Stadium (crowd: 11,506)	Report
Sunday, 29 May (12:40 pm)	Adelaide 8.13 (61)	def. by	Brisbane Lions 15.11 (101)	AAMI Stadium (crowd: 34,583)	Report
Sunday, 29 May (2:10 pm)	Collingwood 16.9 (105)	def.	West Coast 7.11 (53)	MCG (crowd: 52,560)	Report
Sunday, 29 May (4:40 pm)	Western Bulldogs 9.8 (62)	def. by	Hawthorn 13.13 (91)	Etihad Stadium (crowd: 30,747)	Report
	Bye; Essendon

=== Round 11 ===
	Round 11
Friday, 3 June (7:40 pm)	Essendon 10.8 (68)	def. by	Melbourne 15.11 (101)	MCG (crowd: 53,077)	Report
Saturday, 4 June (1:10 pm)	West Coast 13.7 (85)	def.	Gold Coast 10.7 (67)	Patersons Stadium (crowd: 36,815)	Report
Saturday, 4 June (2:10 pm)	Geelong 23.10 (148)	def.	Western Bulldogs 13.9 (87)	Skilled Stadium (crowd: 25,078)	Report
Saturday, 4 June (7:10 pm)	Collingwood 16.12 (108)	def.	St Kilda 7.9 (51)	MCG (crowd: 62,991)	Report
Saturday, 4 June (7:10 pm)	Brisbane Lions 7.9 (51)	def. by	Sydney 17.14 (116)	The Gabba (crowd: 22,150)	Report
Sunday, 5 June (1:10 pm)	Hawthorn 17.9 (111)	def.	Fremantle 13.11 (89)	MCG (crowd: 31,925)	Report
Sunday, 5 June (2:10 pm)	North Melbourne 18.7 (115)	def.	Adelaide 10.8 (68)	Etihad Stadium (crowd: 18,185)	Report
Sunday, 5 June (4:10 pm)	Port Adelaide 7.7 (49)	def. by	Carlton 16.15 (111)	AAMI Stadium (crowd: 23,192)	Report
	Bye; Richmond

=== Round 12 ===
	Round 12 (Women's Round & Queen's Birthday)
Friday, 10 June (7:40 pm)	St Kilda 12.9 (81)	def.	Western Bulldogs 8.9 (57)	Etihad Stadium (crowd: 31,237)	Report
Saturday, 11 June (2:40 pm)	Adelaide 10.7 (67)	def. by	West Coast 15.16 (106)	AAMI Stadium (crowd: 31,412)	Report
Saturday, 11 June (7:10 pm)	Gold Coast 9.9 (63)	def. by	North Melbourne 18.14 (122)	Metricon Stadium (crowd: 14,945)	Report
Saturday, 11 June (7:10 pm)	Geelong 13.10 (88)	def.	Hawthorn 13.5 (83)	MCG (crowd: 63,476)	Report
Sunday, 12 June (1:10 pm)	Carlton 19.10 (124)	def.	Brisbane Lions 9.9 (63)	Etihad Stadium (crowd: 43,617)	Report
Sunday, 12 June (2:10 pm)	Sydney 9.21 (75)	def.	Richmond 9.11 (65)	SCG (crowd: 23,782)	Report
Sunday, 12 June (2:40 pm)	Fremantle 15.8 (98)	def.	Essendon 9.10 (64)	Patersons Stadium (crowd: 35,824)	Report
Monday, 13 June (2:10 pm)	Melbourne 6.5 (41)	def. by	Collingwood 19.15 (129)	MCG (crowd: 75,998)	Report
	Bye; Port Adelaide
Brent Harvey played his 312th game for North Melbourne, breaking the club games record previously held by Glenn Archer.

=== Round 13 ===
	Round 13
Friday, 17 June (7:40 pm)	Western Bulldogs 14.16 (100)	def.	Adelaide 10.10 (70)	Etihad Stadium (crowd: 19,363)	Report
Saturday, 18 June (2:10 pm)	Hawthorn 19.15 (129)	def.	Gold Coast 8.10 (58)	Aurora Stadium (crowd: 16,377)	Report
Saturday, 18 June (2:10 pm)	Essendon 12.18 (90)	def. by	North Melbourne 17.9 (111)	Etihad Stadium (crowd: 42,329)	Report
Saturday, 18 June (7:10 pm)	Brisbane Lions 14.10 (94)	def. by	Richmond 18.17 (125)	The Gabba (crowd: 21,510)	Report
Saturday, 18 June (7:10 pm)	St Kilda 11.6 (72)	def. by	Geelong 15.10 (100)	MCG (crowd: 39,539)	Report
Sunday, 19 June (1:10 pm)	Melbourne 22.17 (149)	def.	Fremantle 8.12 (60)	MCG (crowd: 19,092)	Report
Sunday, 19 June (2:10 pm)	Carlton 15.10 (100)	def.	Sydney 10.6 (66)	Etihad Stadium (crowd: 42,788)	Report
Sunday, 19 June (2:40 pm)	West Coast 15.20 (110)	def.	Port Adelaide 13.10 (88)	Patersons Stadium (crowd: 35,059)	Report
	Bye; Collingwood
Melbourne recorded its biggest ever victory over Fremantle, winning by 89 points.

=== Round 14 ===
	Round 14
Friday, 24 June (7:40 pm)	Hawthorn 23.8 (146)	def.	Essendon 12.9 (81)	MCG (crowd: 64,537)	Report
Saturday, 25 June (2:10 pm)	Gold Coast 13.10 (88)	def. by	Western Bulldogs 17.8 (110)	Metricon Stadium (crowd: 16,149)	Report
Saturday, 25 June (2:10 pm)	Richmond 13.13 (91)	def. by	Melbourne 17.16 (118)	MCG (crowd: 61,900)	Report
Saturday, 25 June (7:10 pm)	Sydney 14.9 (93)	def. by	Collingwood 13.21 (99)	ANZ Stadium (crowd: 38,053)	Report
Saturday, 25 June (5:40 pm)	Fremantle 12.16 (88)	def.	Brisbane Lions 10.5 (65)	Patersons Stadium (crowd: 30,330)	Report
Sunday, 26 June (1:10 pm)	Geelong 19.11 (125)	def.	Adelaide 10.13 (73)	Skilled Stadium (crowd: 23,246)	Report
Sunday, 26 June (2:10 pm)	Carlton 10.7 (67)	def. by	West Coast 15.13 (103)	Etihad Stadium (crowd: 38,241)	Report
Sunday, 26 June (4:10 pm)	Port Adelaide 14.7 (91)	def. by	North Melbourne 21.10 (136)	AAMI Stadium (crowd: 17,275)	Report
	Bye; St Kilda

=== Round 15 ===
	Round 15
Friday, 1 July (7:40 pm)	Western Bulldogs 19.13 (127)	def.	Melbourne 8.15 (63)	Etihad Stadium (crowd: 29,516)	Report
Saturday, 2 July (1:10 pm)	Fremantle 17.10 (112)	def.	Gold Coast 9.8 (62)	Patersons Stadium (crowd: 28,646)	Report
Saturday, 2 July (2:10 pm)	Richmond 12.9 (81)	def. by	Carlton 28.16 (184)	MCG (crowd: 59,650)	Report
Saturday, 2 July (7:10 pm)	Essendon 18.7 (115)	def.	Geelong 16.15 (111)	Etihad Stadium (crowd: 43,806)	Report
Saturday, 2 July (7:10 pm)	Adelaide 8.9 (57)	def.	Sydney 6.14 (50)	AAMI Stadium (crowd: 23,063)	Report
Sunday, 3 July (1:10 pm)	Brisbane Lions 15.9 (99)	def.	Port Adelaide 13.10 (88)	The Gabba (crowd: 17,276)	Report
Sunday, 3 July (2:10 pm)	Collingwood 15.16 (106)	def.	Hawthorn 9.11 (65)	MCG (crowd: 83,985)	Report
Sunday, 3 July (4:40 pm)	North Melbourne 10.10 (70)	def. by	St Kilda 12.7 (79)	Etihad Stadium (crowd: 29,693)	Report
	Bye; West Coast
Carlton recorded its highest ever score against Richmond, kicking 28.16 (184).; Essendon defeated Geelong, ending Geelong's thirteen-game winning streak to start the season.

=== Round 16 ===
	Round 16
Friday, 8 July (6:40 pm)	West Coast 14.12 (96)	def.	Geelong 13.10 (88)	Patersons Stadium (crowd: 40,164)	Report
Saturday, 9 July (2:10 pm)	Hawthorn 16.9 (105)	def.	Brisbane Lions 9.9 (63)	Aurora Stadium (crowd: 14,604)	Report
Saturday, 9 July (7:10 pm)	Gold Coast 4.12 (36)	def. by	Sydney 15.16 (106)	Metricon Stadium (crowd: 16,488)	Report
Saturday, 9 July (7:10 pm)	Essendon 15.15 (105)	def.	Richmond 9.12 (66)	MCG (crowd: 55,442)	Report
Sunday, 10 July (1:10 pm)	Collingwood 22.15 (147)	def.	North Melbourne 3.12 (30)	MCG (crowd: 53,601)	Report
Sunday, 10 July (2:40 pm)	Port Adelaide 8.5 (53)	def. by	St Kilda 17.7 (109)	AAMI Stadium (crowd: 16,887)	Report
Sunday, 10 July (4:40 pm)	Western Bulldogs 14.12 (96)	def.	Carlton 9.15 (69)	Etihad Stadium (crowd: 38,582)	Report
	Bye; Adelaide, Fremantle, Melbourne
Jonathan Brown became the Brisbane Lions' all-time leading goalkicker, surpassing Daniel Bradshaw's total of 496.; Collingwood recorded its largest ever victory over North Melbourne, by a margin of 117 points.

=== Round 17 ===
	Round 17 (Multicultural Round)
Friday, 15 July (8:10 pm)	Adelaide 10.13 (73)	def. by	Essendon 12.12 (84)	AAMI Stadium (crowd: 38,118)	Report
Saturday, 16 July (2:10 pm)	Richmond 9.16 (70)	def. by	Gold Coast 12.13 (85)	Cazaly's Stadium (crowd: 10,382)	Report
Saturday, 16 July (2:10 pm)	Carlton 11.13 (79)	def. by	Collingwood 13.20 (98)	MCG (crowd: 85,936)	Report
Saturday, 16 July (7:10 pm)	St Kilda 13.4 (82)	def.	West Coast 9.7 (61)	Etihad Stadium (crowd: 31,416)	Report
Saturday, 16 July (8:10 pm)	Melbourne 17.11 (113)	def.	Port Adelaide 14.8 (92)	TIO Stadium (crowd: 7,255)	Report
Sunday, 17 July (1:10 pm)	Sydney 13.9 (87)	def. by	Fremantle 15.8 (98)	SCG (crowd: 23,415)	Report
Sunday, 17 July (2:10 pm)	Brisbane Lions 15.14 (104)	def. by	Geelong 20.13 (133)	The Gabba (crowd: 19,906)	Report
Sunday, 17 July (4:40 pm)	North Melbourne 21.16 (142)	def.	Western Bulldogs 17.9 (111)	Etihad Stadium (crowd: 22,754)	Report
	Bye; Hawthorn

=== Round 18 ===
	Round 18
Friday, 22 July (7:40 pm)	St Kilda 19.13 (127)	def.	Adelaide 3.6 (24)	Etihad Stadium (crowd: 26,546)	Report
Saturday, 23 July (2:10 pm)	North Melbourne 17.20 (122)	def.	Brisbane Lions 11.11 (77)	Etihad Stadium (crowd: 20,809)	Report
Saturday, 23 July (2:10 pm)	Sydney 16.18 (114)	def.	Western Bulldogs 11.9 (75)	SCG (crowd: 19,449)	Report
Saturday, 23 July (7:10 pm)	Gold Coast 11.9 (75)	def. by	Collingwood 19.15 (129)	Metricon Stadium (crowd: 23,302)	Report
Saturday, 23 July (7:10 pm)	Essendon 12.7 (79)	def. by	Carlton 24.9 (153)	MCG (crowd: 74,123)	Report
Sunday, 24 July (1:10 pm)	Geelong 17.11 (113)	def.	Richmond 7.9 (51)	Etihad Stadium (crowd: 33,761)	Report
Sunday, 24 July (2:10 pm)	Melbourne 12.6 (78)	def. by	Hawthorn 20.12 (132)	MCG (crowd: 39,782)	Report
Sunday, 24 July (2:40 pm)	Fremantle 9.10 (64)	def. by	West Coast 8.17 (65)	Patersons Stadium (crowd: 41,055)	Report
	Bye; Port Adelaide
Adelaide's score of 3.6 (24) set a new record as the lowest match score ever in club history, breaking the previous club record of 4.7 (31) set in round 7, 1991; and, it set a new record as the lowest match score ever at Etihad Stadium. It was the lowest score conceded in a match by St Kilda since round 12, 1971. Following the loss, Neil Craig resigned as Adelaide head coach, effective immediately, and was replaced by Mark Bickley as caretaker.; A new record crowd for any event at Metricon Stadium was set when 23,302 spectators watched Gold Coast play Collingwood. Reportedly, 7,000 of those spectators were Collingwood supporters who made the trip from Melbourne to watch the match.; Fremantle forward Hayden Ballantyne hit the post from 50 metres out on the boundary line after the siren against West Coast. A goal would have won the game.

=== Round 19 ===
	Round 19
Friday, 29 July (7:40 pm)	North Melbourne 9.8 (62)	def. by	Carlton 11.14 (80)	Etihad Stadium (crowd: 41,332)	Report
Saturday, 30 July (2:10 pm)	Western Bulldogs 15.5 (95)	def. by	West Coast 15.13 (103)	Etihad Stadium (crowd: 28,883)	Report
Saturday, 30 July (2:10 pm)	Geelong 37.11 (233)	def.	Melbourne 7.5 (47)	Skilled Stadium (crowd: 22,716)	Report
Saturday, 30 July (7:10 pm)	Gold Coast 6.18 (54)	def. by	St Kilda 10.14 (74)	Metricon Stadium (crowd: 17,482)	Report
Saturday, 30 July (5:40 pm)	Fremantle 6.8 (44)	def. by	Hawthorn 13.17 (95)	Patersons Stadium (crowd: 30,937)	Report
Sunday, 31 July (2:10 pm)	Collingwood 25.16 (166)	def.	Essendon 14.8 (92)	MCG (crowd: 73,163)	Report
Sunday, 31 July (4:10 pm)	Adelaide 16.15 (111)	def.	Port Adelaide 11.13 (79)	AAMI Stadium (crowd: 40,586)	Report
	Bye; Brisbane Lions, Richmond, Sydney
Geelong's final score of 37.11 (233) stands, as of 2023, as the second-highest ever scored by Geelong, the second-highest score ever conceded by Melbourne, the highest score ever at Skilled Stadium, the fourth-highest score of all-time, and the highest score by any team since quarters were shortened to 20 minutes in 1994.; Geelong's final winning margin of 186 points stands, as of 2023, as Geelong's highest ever, the highest ever at Skilled Stadium, the second-highest ever conceded by Melbourne, the second-highest of all-time, and the largest since quarters were shortened to 20 minutes in 1994.; Geelong's second quarter score of 12.1 (73) was the highest ever by Geelong, and the equal-highest ever conceded by Melbourne.; Geelong recorded 510 disposals through the game, a new record.; Melbourne coach Dean Bailey was sacked by the club at an emergency board meeting on the day after the 186-point loss, to be replaced immediately by Todd Viney as caretaker.

=== Round 20 ===
	Round 20
Friday, 5 August (7:40 pm)	St Kilda 16.17 (113)	def.	Fremantle 10.12 (72)	Etihad Stadium (crowd: 26,181)	Report
Saturday, 6 August (1:40 pm)	Geelong 29.14 (188)	def.	Gold Coast 6.2 (38)	Skilled Stadium (crowd: 24,588)	Report
Saturday, 6 August (2:10 pm)	Carlton 21.8 (134)	def.	Melbourne 7.16 (58)	MCG (crowd: 42,342)	Report
Saturday, 6 August (7:20 pm)	Essendon 15.10 (100)	def.	Sydney 14.15 (99)	Etihad Stadium (crowd: 38,722)	Report
Saturday, 6 August (7:10 pm)	Port Adelaide 3.3 (21)	def. by	Collingwood 23.21 (159)	AAMI Stadium (crowd: 21,863)	Report
Sunday, 7 August (1:10 pm)	Brisbane Lions 16.9 (105)	def. by	Adelaide 16.14 (110)	The Gabba (crowd: 17,930)	Report
Sunday, 7 August (2:10 pm)	Hawthorn 15.13 (103)	def.	North Melbourne 13.8 (86)	Aurora Stadium (crowd: 16,820)	Report
Sunday, 7 August (2:40 pm)	West Coast 22.15 (147)	def.	Richmond 14.6 (90)	Patersons Stadium (crowd: 38,106)	Report
	Bye; Western Bulldogs
Gold Coast's defeat of 150 points stands, as of Round 5, 2025, as the club's greatest losing margin.; Adam Goodes (Sydney) missed a set shot after the siren from 50m, resulting in Sydney's one point loss to Essendon.; Port Adelaide's final score of 3.3 (21) and its losing margin of 138 points against Collingwood were in both cases new records as the worst in club history; the new record-losing margin for the club lasted only until the following round. Port Adelaide's total of six scoring shots was the fewest in club history, and the fewest by any team since round 12, 1971. For Collingwood, the winning margin was its highest since round 4, 1979, and the third biggest win in its history.

=== Round 21 ===
	Round 21
Friday, 12 August (7:40 pm)	St Kilda 10.10 (70)	def. by	Collingwood 14.5 (89)	Etihad Stadium (crowd: 46,505)	Report
Saturday, 13 August (2:10 pm)	Hawthorn 31.11 (197)	def.	Port Adelaide 5.2 (32)	MCG (crowd: 27,532)	Report
Saturday, 13 August (1:10 pm)	Fremantle 12.13 (85)	def. by	Carlton 16.19 (115)	Patersons Stadium (crowd: 34,737)	Report
Saturday, 13 August (7:10 pm)	Western Bulldogs 15.11 (101)	def. by	Essendon 23.12 (150)	Etihad Stadium (crowd: 38,986)	Report
Saturday, 13 August (7:10 pm)	Brisbane Lions 18.15 (123)	def.	Gold Coast 8.13 (61)	The Gabba (crowd: 23,565)	Report
Sunday, 14 August (1:10 pm)	Melbourne 9.8 (62)	def. by	West Coast 16.14 (110)	Etihad Stadium (crowd: 15,740)	Report
Sunday, 14 August (2:10 pm)	Richmond 14.15 (99)	def.	Sydney 7.14 (56)	MCG (crowd: 34,337)	Report
Sunday, 14 August (4:10 pm)	Adelaide 12.13 (85)	def. by	Geelong 14.12 (96)	AAMI Stadium (crowd: 33,576)	Report
	Bye; North Melbourne
Hawthorn's winning margin of 165 points against Port Adelaide was: the highest winning margin in Hawthorn's history, surpassing the previous record of 160 points set in 1992); the highest winning margin by any club at the MCG; and the highest losing margin in Port Adelaide's history (surpassing the record of 138 points set the previous week).; This was the last round coached for the season by Western Bulldogs coach Rodney Eade. His contract was not renewed for 2012, and he elected to stand aside immediately rather than complete the season. Paul Williams replaced him as caretaker for the last three matches.

=== Round 22 ===
	Round 22
Friday, 19 August (7:40 pm)	Carlton 8.18 (66)	def. by	Hawthorn 10.18 (78)	Etihad Stadium (crowd: 52,052)	Report
Saturday, 20 August (2:10 pm)	Gold Coast 9.10 (64)	def. by	Adelaide 18.17 (125)	Metricon Stadium (crowd: 16,168)	Report
Saturday, 20 August (1:10 pm)	West Coast 20.14 (134)	def.	Essendon 11.11 (77)	Patersons Stadium (crowd: 38,253)	Report
Saturday, 20 August (7:10 pm)	North Melbourne 21.17 (143)	def.	Fremantle 6.9 (45)	Etihad Stadium (crowd: 17,581)	Report
Saturday, 20 August (7:10 pm)	Collingwood 14.18 (102)	def.	Brisbane Lions 13.6 (84)	MCG (crowd: 47,788)	Report
Sunday, 21 August (1:10 pm)	Sydney 10.23 (83)	def.	St Kilda 10.8 (68)	ANZ Stadium (crowd: 25,025)	Report
Sunday, 21 August (2:40 pm)	Port Adelaide 15.7 (97)	def. by	Western Bulldogs 24.13 (157)	AAMI Stadium (crowd: 14,169)	Report
Sunday, 21 August (4:40 pm)	Melbourne 17.8 (110)	def. by	Richmond 17.15 (117)	MCG (crowd: 36,321)	Report
	Bye; Geelong
Scott Thompson (Adelaide) recorded 51 disposals against Gold Coast, which at the time was the most since Greg Williams' 53 disposals in 1989.

=== Round 23 ===
	Round 23
Friday, 26 August (6:40 pm)	Fremantle 8.4 (52)	def. by	Collingwood 20.12 (132)	Patersons Stadium (crowd: 31,985)	Report
Saturday, 27 August (2:10 pm)	Hawthorn 16.17 (113)	def.	Western Bulldogs 10.7 (67)	MCG (crowd: 42,198)	Report
Saturday, 27 August (2:10 pm)	Geelong 12.14 (86)	def. by	Sydney 15.9 (99)	Skilled Stadium (crowd: 25,900)	Report
Saturday, 27 August (7:10 pm)	St Kilda 19.21 (135)	def.	North Melbourne 10.10 (70)	Etihad Stadium (crowd: 35,848)	Report
Saturday, 27 August (7:10 pm)	Brisbane Lions 11.15 (81)	def. by	West Coast 13.11 (89)	The Gabba (crowd: 13,500)	Report
Sunday, 28 August (12:40 pm)	Adelaide 15.9 (99)	def. by	Richmond 17.19 (121)	AAMI Stadium (crowd: 38,023)	Report
Sunday, 28 August (2:10 pm)	Melbourne 17.10 (112)	def.	Gold Coast 12.10 (82)	MCG (crowd: 21,534)	Report
Sunday, 28 August (4:40 pm)	Essendon 17.18 (120)	def.	Port Adelaide 17.11 (113)	Etihad Stadium (crowd: 34,849)	Report
	Bye; Carlton
Geelong lost its first match at Skilled Stadium since round 21, 2007, ending a streak of 29 consecutive victories at Skilled Stadium, the most by any club at any venue.

=== Round 24 ===
	Round 24
Friday, 2 September (7:40 pm)	Collingwood 8.5 (53)	def. by	Geelong 22.17 (149)	MCG (crowd: 85,705)	Report
Saturday, 3 September (1:10 pm)	Gold Coast 14.13 (97)	def. by	Hawthorn 16.10 (106)	Metricon Stadium (crowd: 19,314)	Report
Saturday, 3 September (2:10 pm)	Western Bulldogs 15.17 (107)	def.	Fremantle 8.13 (61)	Etihad Stadium (crowd: 18,128)	Report
Saturday, 3 September (4:10 pm)	Sydney 18.11 (119)	def.	Brisbane Lions 9.13 (67)	SCG (crowd: 27,721)	Report
Saturday, 3 September (5:10 pm)	West Coast 22.13 (145)	def.	Adelaide 7.8 (50)	Patersons Stadium (crowd: 36,062)	Report
Saturday, 3 September (7:10 pm)	Carlton 9.12 (66)	def. by	St Kilda 13.8 (86)	MCG (crowd: 55,606)	Report
Sunday, 4 September (2:40 pm)	Port Adelaide 17.10 (112)	def.	Melbourne 15.14 (104)	Adelaide Oval (crowd: 29,340) (Moved from AAMI Stadium)	Report
Sunday, 4 September (4:40 pm)	Richmond 13.13 (91)	def. by	North Melbourne 15.14 (104)	Etihad Stadium (crowd: 32,890)	Report
	Bye; Essendon
Geelong recorded its greatest ever winning margin against Collingwood by 96 points.; The Port Adelaide vs Melbourne match was originally scheduled to be played at AAMI Stadium. On 30 June 2011, the AFL announced the match would be moved to the Adelaide Oval. This was the first AFL match to be played at the venue.; Port Adelaide's win over Melbourne ended a club record 11-match losing streak and lifted it off the bottom of the ladder. This ensured that Gold Coast finished its inaugural AFL season with the wooden spoon.

== Win/loss table ==
Team	1	2	3	4	5	6	7	8	9	10	11	12	13	14	15	16	17	18	19	20	21	22	23	24	F1	F2	F3	GF	Ladder
Adelaide	**Haw** **+20**	X	**Frem** **−25**	PA −32	Carl −6	**StK** **+19**	Melb −96	**GCS** **+57**	Coll −43	**BL** **−40**	NM −47	**WCE** **−39**	WB −30	Geel −52	**Syd** **+7**	X	**Ess** **−11**	StK −103	**PA** **+32**	BL +5	**Geel** **−11**	GCS +61	**Rich** **−22**	WCE −95	X	X	X	X	14
Brisbane Lions	**Frem** **−2**	WB −78	Melb −11	X	**StK** **−13**	Rich −26	GCS −8	**Ess** **−36**	**NM** **+14**	Adel +40	**Syd** **−65**	Carl −61	**Rich** **−31**	Frem −23	**PA** **+11**	Haw −42	**Geel** **−29**	NM −45	X	**Adel** **−5**	**GCS** **+62**	Coll −18	**WCE** **−8**	Syd −52	X	X	X	X	15
Carlton	**Rich** **+20**	GCS +119	Coll −28	**Ess**; **0**	**Adel** **+6**	Syd +16	StK +3	X	**Geel** **−2**	Melb +47	PA +62	**BL** **+61**	**Syd** **+34**	**WCE** **−36**	Rich +103	WB −27	**Coll** **−19**	Ess +74	NM +18	**Melb** **+76**	Frem +30	**Haw** **−12**	X	**StK** **−20**	**Ess** **+62**	WCE −3	X	X	**5**
Collingwood	**PA** **+75**	NM +87	**Carl** **+28**	Rich +71	Ess +30	**WB** **+48**	X	Geel −3	**Adel** **+43**	**WCE** **+52**	**StK** **+57**	Melb +88	X	Syd +6	**Haw** **+41**	**NM** **+117**	Carl +19	GCS +54	**Ess** **+74**	PA +138	StK +19	**BL** **+18**	Frem +80	**Geel** **−96**	**WCE** **+20**	X	**Haw** **+3**	**Geel** **−38**	**1**
Essendon	**WB** **+55**	Syd −5	StK +52	Carl; 0	**Coll** **−30**	**GCS** **+139**	**WCE** **+16**	BL +36	Rich −16	X	**Melb** **−33**	Frem −34	**NM** **−21**	Haw −65	**Geel** **+4**	**Rich** **+39**	Adel +11	**Carl** **−74**	Coll −74	**Syd** **+1**	WB +49	WCE −57	**PA** **+7**	X	Carl −62	X	X	X	**8**
Fremantle	BL +2	**Geel** **−11**	Adel +25	**NM** **+29**	**WB** **+7**	X	Rich −49	WCE −33	PA +52	**StK** **−46**	Haw −22	**Ess** **+34**	Melb −89	**BL** **+23**	**GCS** **+50**	X	Syd +11	**WCE** **−1**	**Haw** **−51**	StK −41	**Carl** **−30**	NM −98	**Coll** **−80**	WB −46	X	X	X	X	11
Gold Coast	X	**Carl** **−119**	WB −71	**Melb** **−90**	PA +3	Ess −139	**BL** **+8**	Adel −57	X	**Geel** **−66**	WCE −18	**NM** **−59**	Haw −71	**WB** **−22**	Frem −50	**Syd** **−70**	Rich +15	**Coll** **−54**	**StK** **−20**	Geel −150	BL −62	**Adel** **−61**	Melb −30	**Haw** **−9**	X	X	X	X	17
Geelong	**StK** **+1**	Frem +11	**PA** **+79**	Syd +27	Haw +19	X	**NM** **+66**	**Coll** **+3**	Carl +2	GCS +66	**WB** **+61**	**Haw** **+5**	StK +28	**Adel** **+52**	Ess −4	WCE −8	BL +29	**Rich** **+62**	**Melb** **+186**	**GCS** **+150**	Adel +11	X	**Syd** **−13**	Coll +96	**Haw** **+31**	X	**WCE** **+48**	Coll +38	**2**
Hawthorn	Adel −20	**Melb** **+45**	Rich +63	**WCE** **+7**	**Geel** **−19**	X	PA +32	**StK** **+30**	Syd +46	WB +29	**Frem** **+22**	Geel −5	**GCS** **+71**	**Ess** **+65**	Coll −41	**BL** **+42**	X	Melb +54	Frem +51	**NM** **+17**	**PA** **+165**	Carl +12	**WB** **+46**	GCS +9	Geel −31	**Syd** **+36**	Coll −3	X	**3**
Melbourne	**Syd**; **0**	Haw −45	**BL** **+11**	GCS +90	X	WCE −54	**Adel** **+96**	NM −41	StK −20	**Carl** **−47**	Ess +33	**Coll** **−88**	**Frem** **+89**	Rich +27	WB −64	X	**PA** **+21**	**Haw** **−54**	Geel −186	Carl −76	**WCE** **−48**	**Rich** **−7**	**GCS** **+30**	PA −8	X	X	X	X	13
North Melbourne	WCE −4	**Coll** **−87**	X	Frem −29	**Rich** **−9**	**PA** **+60**	Geel −66	**Melb** **+41**	BL −14	**Syd** **−1**	**Adel** **+47**	GCS +59	Ess +21	PA +45	**StK** **−9**	Coll −117	**WB** **+31**	**BL** **+45**	**Carl** **−18**	Haw −17	X	**Frem** **+98**	StK −65	Rich +13	X	X	X	X	9
Port Adelaide	Coll −75	**WCE** **−18**	Geel −79	**Adel** **+32**	**GCS** **−3**	NM −60	**Haw** **−32**	Syd −62	**Frem** **−52**	Rich +15	**Carl** **−62**	X	WCE −22	**NM** **−45**	BL −11	**StK** **−56**	Melb −21	X	Adel −32	**Coll** **−138**	Haw −165	**WB** **−60**	Ess −7	**Melb** **+8**	X	X	X	X	16
Richmond	Carl −20	StK; 0	**Haw** **−63**	**Coll** **−71**	NM +9	**BL** **+26**	**Frem** **+49**	WB −35	**Ess** **+16**	**PA** **−15**	X	Syd −10	BL +31	**Melb** **−27**	**Carl** **−103**	Ess −39	**GCS** **−15**	Geel −62	X	WCE −57	**Syd** **+43**	Melb +7	Adel +22	**NM** **−13**	X	X	X	X	12
St Kilda	Geel −1	**Rich**; **0**	**Ess** **−52**	X	BL +13	Adel −19	**Carl** **−3**	Haw −30	**Melb** **+20**	Frem +46	Coll −57	**WB** **+24**	**Geel** **−28**	X	NM +9	PA +56	**WCE** **+21**	**Adel** **+103**	GCS +20	**Frem** **+41**	**Coll** **−19**	Syd −15	**NM** **+65**	Carl +20	**Syd** **−25**	X	X	X	**6**
Sydney	Melb; 0	**Ess** **+5**	WCE +13	**Geel** **−27**	X	**Carl** **−16**	WB +8	**PA** **+62**	**Haw** **−46**	NM +1	BL +65	**Rich** **+10**	Carl −34	**Coll** **−6**	Adel −7	GCS +70	**Frem** **−11**	**WB** **+39**	X	Ess −1	Rich −43	**StK** **+15**	Geel +13	**BL** **+52**	StK +25	Haw −36	X	X	**7**
West Coast	**NM** **+4**	PA +18	**Syd** **−13**	Haw −7	X	**Melb** **+54**	Ess −16	**Frem** **+33**	**WB** **+123**	Coll −52	**GCS** **+18**	Adel +39	**PA** **+22**	Carl +36	X	**Geel** **+8**	StK −21	Frem +1	WB +8	**Rich** **+57**	Melb +48	**Ess** **+57**	BL +8	**Adel** **+95**	Coll −20	**Carl** **+3**	Geel −48	X	**4**
Western Bulldogs	Ess −55	**BL** **+78**	**GCS** **+71**	X	Frem −7	Coll −48	**Syd** **−8**	**Rich** **+35**	WCE −123	**Haw** **−29**	Geel −61	StK −24	**Adel** **+30**	GCS +22	**Melb** **+64**	**Carl** **+27**	NM −31	Syd −39	**WCE** **−8**	X	**Ess** **−49**	PA +60	Haw −46	**Frem** **+46**	X	X	X	X	10
Team	1	2	3	4	5	6	7	8	9	10	11	12	13	14	15	16	17	18	19	20	21	22	23	24	F1	F2	F3	GF	Ladder

+	Win	Qualified for finals
−	Loss	Eliminated

Bold – Home game
X – Bye
Opponent for round listed above margin

== Ladder ==
2011 AFL ladder
Pos	Team	Pld	W	L	D	PF	PA	PP	Pts	
1	Collingwood	22	20	2	0	2592	1546	167.7	80	Finals series
2	Geelong (P)	22	19	3	0	2548	1619	157.4	76	Finals series
3	Hawthorn	22	18	4	0	2355	1634	144.1	72	Finals series
4	West Coast	22	17	5	0	2235	1715	130.3	68	Finals series
5	Carlton	22	14	7	1	2225	1700	130.9	58	Finals series
6	St Kilda	22	12	9	1	1891	1677	112.8	50	Finals series
7	Sydney	22	12	9	1	1897	1735	109.3	50	Finals series
8	Essendon	22	11	10	1	2217	2217	100.0	46	Finals series
9	North Melbourne	22	10	12	0	2106	2082	101.2	40	
10	Western Bulldogs	22	9	13	0	2060	2155	95.6	36	
11	Fremantle	22	9	13	0	1791	2155	83.1	36	
12	Richmond	22	8	13	1	2069	2396	86.4	34	
13	Melbourne	22	8	13	1	1974	2315	85.3	34	
14	Adelaide	22	7	15	0	1742	2193	79.4	28	
15	Brisbane Lions	22	4	18	0	1814	2240	81.0	16	
16	Port Adelaide	22	3	19	0	1718	2663	64.5	12	
17	Gold Coast	22	3	19	0	1534	2726	56.3	12	

Source: AFL ladder
Rules for classification: 1) points; 2) percentage; 3) number of points for.
(P) Premiers

=== Ladder progression ===
Numbers highlighted in green indicate that the team finished the round inside the top 8.
Numbers highlighted in blue indicates the team finished first on the ladder in that round.
Numbers highlighted in red indicates the team finished in last place on the ladder in that round.
Underlined numbers indicate that the team had a bye during that round.

Team ╲ Round	1	2	3	4	5	6	7	8	9	10	11	12	13	14	15	16	17	18	19	20	21	22	23	24
Collingwood	4	8	12	16	20	24	24	24	28	32	36	40	40	44	48	52	56	60	64	68	72	76	80	80
Geelong	4	8	12	16	20	20	24	28	32	36	40	44	48	52	52	52	56	60	64	68	72	72	72	76
Hawthorn	0	4	8	12	12	12	16	20	24	28	32	32	36	40	40	44	44	48	52	56	60	64	68	72
West Coast	4	8	8	8	8	12	12	16	20	20	24	28	32	36	36	40	40	44	48	52	56	60	64	68
Carlton	4	8	8	10	14	18	22	22	22	26	30	34	38	38	42	42	42	46	50	54	58	58	58	58
St Kilda	0	2	2	2	6	6	6	6	10	14	14	18	18	18	22	26	30	34	38	42	42	42	46	50
Sydney	2	6	10	10	10	10	14	18	18	22	26	30	30	30	30	34	34	38	38	38	38	42	46	50
Essendon	4	4	8	10	10	14	18	22	22	22	22	22	22	22	26	30	34	34	34	38	42	42	46	46
North Melbourne	0	0	0	0	0	4	4	8	8	8	12	16	20	24	24	24	28	32	32	32	32	36	36	40
Western Bulldogs	0	4	8	8	8	8	8	12	12	12	12	12	16	20	24	28	28	28	28	28	28	32	32	36
Fremantle	4	4	8	12	16	16	16	16	20	20	20	24	24	28	32	32	36	36	36	36	36	36	36	36
Richmond	0	2	2	2	6	10	14	14	18	18	18	18	22	22	22	22	22	22	22	22	26	30	34	34
Melbourne	2	2	6	10	10	10	14	14	14	14	18	18	22	26	26	26	30	30	30	30	30	30	34	34
Adelaide	4	4	4	4	4	8	8	12	12	12	12	12	12	12	16	16	16	16	20	24	24	28	28	28
Brisbane Lions	0	0	0	0	0	0	0	0	4	8	8	8	8	8	12	12	12	12	12	12	16	16	16	16
Port Adelaide	0	0	0	4	4	4	4	4	4	8	8	8	8	8	8	8	8	8	8	8	8	8	8	12
Gold Coast	0	0	0	0	4	4	8	8	8	8	8	8	8	8	8	8	12	12	12	12	12	12	12	12

Source: AFL Tables

== Finals series ==
Qualifying and elimination finals
10 Sep, MCG
1	Collingwood	12.10 (82)
4	West Coast	9.8 (62)
11 Sep, MCG
5	Carlton	21.23 (149)
8	Essendon	13.9 (87)
10 Sep, Etihad Stadium
6	St Kilda	8.9 (57)
7	Sydney	12.10 (82)
9 Sep, MCG
2	Geelong	14.14 (98)
3	Hawthorn	9.13 (67)

Semi-finals
17 Sep, Patersons
West Coast	15.11 (101)
Carlton	15.8 (98)
16 Sep, MCG
Hawthorn	19.8 (122)
Sydney	13.8 (86)

Preliminary finals
23 Sep, MCG
Collingwood	10.8 (68)
Hawthorn	9.11 (65)
24 Sep, MCG
Geelong	17.15 (117)
West Coast	10.9 (69)

Grand final
1 Oct, MCG
Collingwood	12.9 (81)
Geelong	18.11 (119)

=== Week one ===
	Qualifying finals
Saturday, 10 September (2:20 pm)	Collingwood 12.10 (82)	def.	West Coast 9.8 (62)	MCG (crowd: 67,379)	Report
Friday, 9 September (7:45 pm)	Geelong 14.14 (98)	def.	Hawthorn 9.13 (67)	MCG (crowd: 73,400)	Report

	Elimination finals
Sunday, 11 September (2:20 pm)	Carlton 21.23 (149)	def.	Essendon 13.9 (87)	MCG (crowd: 90,161)	Report
Saturday, 10 September (7:20 pm)	St Kilda 8.9 (57)	def. by	Sydney 12.10 (82)	Etihad Stadium (crowd: 39,205)	Report
The elimination final between Carlton and Essendon had an attendance of 90,161, the largest crowd for an elimination final in VFL/AFL history. This record stood until 2013.

=== Week two ===
	Semi finals
Friday, 16 September (7:45 pm)	Hawthorn 19.8 (122)	def.	Sydney 13.8 (86)	MCG (crowd: 55,198)	Report
Saturday, 17 September (5:50 pm)	West Coast 15.11 (101)	def.	Carlton 15.8 (98)	Patersons Stadium (crowd: 42,803)	Report

=== Week three ===
	Preliminary finals
Friday, 23 September (7:45 pm)	Collingwood 10.8 (68)	def.	Hawthorn 9.11 (65)	MCG (crowd: 87,112)	Report
Saturday, 24 September (2:20 pm)	Geelong 17.15 (117)	def.	West Coast 10.9 (69)	MCG (crowd: 59,455)	Report

=== Week four ===
Grand Final
Saturday, 1 October (2:30 pm)	Collingwood	def. by	Geelong	MCG (crowd: 99,537)	Report
4.2 (26); 9.3 (57); 12.6 (78); 12.9 (81)	Q1; Q2; Q3; Final	4.3 (27); 8.6 (54); 13.7 (85); 18.11 (119)	Umpires: C Donlon, B Rosebury, S Ryan; Norm Smith Medal: Jimmy Bartel (Geelong); Television broadcast: Network Ten; National anthem: Vanessa Amorosi
T Cloke, A Krakouer 3 S Sidebottom 2 L Ball, L Brown, B Johnson, S Wellingham 1	Goals	4 S Johnson; 3 J Bartel, T Hawkins, T Varcoe; 2 J Selwood; 1 M Duncan, C Ling, M Stokes
S Pendlebury, D Thomas, S Sidebottom, C Tarrant, L Ball, L Brown, T Cloke	Best	J Bartel, J Selwood, T Hawkins, C Ling, S Johnson, P Chapman, B Ottens, T Varcoe
Nil	Injuries	J Podsiadly (shoulder)
L Davis	Reports	Nil
Collingwood finished its season with three losses, all of which were against Geelong.

== Awards ==
- The Brownlow Medal was awarded to Dane Swan of Collingwood, who received 34 votes.
- The Norm Smith Medal was awarded to Jimmy Bartel of Geelong.
- The AFL Rising Star was awarded to Dyson Heppell of Essendon, who received 44 votes.
- The Coleman Medal was awarded to Lance Franklin of Hawthorn, who kicked 71 goals during the home and away season.
- The McClelland Trophy was awarded to Collingwood.
- The Wooden Spoon was "awarded" to Gold Coast.
- The AFL Players Association Awards were as follows:
  - The Leigh Matthews Trophy was awarded to Chris Judd of Carlton, for being the Most Valuable Player throughout the premiership season.
  - The Robert Rose Award went to Jonathan Brown of Brisbane Lions, for being the Most Courageous Player throughout the premiership season.
  - The Best Captain award went to Chris Judd of Carlton.
  - The Best First-Year Player award was won by Dyson Heppell of Essendon.
- The AFL Coaches Association Awards were as follows:
  - The Player of the Year Award was given to Marc Murphy of Carlton, who received 94 votes.
  - The Allan Jeans Award was given to John Worsfold of West Coast.
  - The Assistant Coach of the Year Award was given to Darren Crocker of North Melbourne.
  - The Best Young Player Award was given to Nat Fyfe of Fremantle.

=== Best and fairest ===
Club	Award name	Player	Ref
Adelaide	Malcolm Blight Medal	Scott Thompson	
Brisbane Lions	Merrett–Murray Medal	Tom Rockliff	
Carlton	John Nicholls Medal	Marc Murphy	
Collingwood	Copeland Trophy	Scott Pendlebury	
Essendon	Crichton Medal	David Zaharakis	
Fremantle	Doig Medal	Matthew Pavlich	
Geelong	Carji Greeves Medal	Corey Enright	
Gold Coast	Club Champion	Gary Ablett, Jr.	
Hawthorn	Peter Crimmins Medal	Sam Mitchell	
Melbourne	Keith 'Bluey' Truscott Medal	Brent Moloney	
North Melbourne	Syd Barker Medal	Daniel Wells; Andrew Swallow	
Port Adelaide	John Cahill Medal	Travis Boak; Jackson Trengove	
Richmond	Jack Dyer Medal	Trent Cotchin	
St Kilda	Trevor Barker Award	Sam Fisher	
Sydney	Bob Skilton Medal	Adam Goodes	
West Coast	Club Champion Award	Darren Glass	
Western Bulldogs	Charles Sutton Medal	Matthew Boyd	

== Notable events and controversies ==
=== Betting scandals ===
The issue of betting became prominent during the 2011 season. The previous few years had seen other sports compromised by major spot-fixing scandals – most notably the Pakistan cricket spot-fixing controversy – so the issue was already well publicised at the time. The AFL had in place a strict policy prohibiting anyone involved in the AFL from placing any bet on any AFL outcome.

Early in the season, it emerged that there were several suspicious plunges on players who were usually defenders to kick the first goal of a match; in each case, the player unexpectedly started in the forward-line, indicating that the plunges may have been caused by team information somehow leaking to punters. Five suspicious plunges on defenders for the first goal were identified during the season:

- Round 7, Port Adelaide vs Hawthorn – Hawthorn midfielder/defender Brent Guerra
- Round 7, Gold Coast vs Brisbane Lions – Brisbane defender Daniel Merrett
- Round 8, Brisbane Lions vs Essendon – Brisbane defender Matt Maguire
- Round 9, Adelaide vs Collingwood – Collingwood defender Nick Maxwell
- Round 24, Gold Coast vs Hawthorn – Gold Coast defender Nathan Bock

Nathan Bock was the only of the five players to kick the first goal of his respective match. The cases all raised concerns about "exotic bets" and the risk of spot-fixing, although in no case was a deliberate attempt at spot-fixing ever implicated.

The controversy deepened prior to round 17, when the investigation into the Maxwell plunge revealed that Heath Shaw was implicated in bets placed on Maxwell's first goal. Shaw and a friend from outside the Collingwood Football Club were found to have placed a shared $20 bet on Maxwell for first goal at a TAB venue, using Shaw's knowledge from team meetings that Maxwell would be starting forward; that friend had later placed two more bets on Maxwell worth $15, shared with another friend. Shaw was penalised by the league under the anti-gambling code, receiving a suspension of eight matches, with a further suspended sentence of six matches, and was fined $20,000.

In their respective investigations, it was found that both Nick Maxwell and Nathan Bock had informed family members and friends that they would be starting in the forward-line before their respective plunges, and, unbeknownst to the players, those family members and friends then placed bets. Maxwell was fined $5,000, with a further suspended fine of $5,000, and Bock was fined $10,000 and suspended for two matches.

Following round 24, Essendon assistant coach Dean Wallis was found to have placed three separate FootyQuad bets worth a total of $400 during the latter half of the season, one of which included a leg which involved an Essendon match. Wallis was fined $7,500, and suspended for fourteen matches (the suspension prevents him from participating on match-day, and from interacting directly with his players during training, until the suspension is complete).

== Club leadership ==
Club	Coach	Captain(s)	Vice-captain(s) and/or "leadership group"
Adelaide	Neil Craig (Rds 1–18); Mark Bickley (Rds 19–24)	Nathan van Berlo	Scott Stevens, Ben Rutten, Michael Doughty and Scott Thompson.
Brisbane Lions	Michael Voss	Jonathan Brown	Daniel Merrett, Jed Adcock, Tom Rockliff
Carlton	Brett Ratten	Chris Judd	Kade Simpson (vc), Andrew Carrazzo, Bryce Gibbs, Michael Jamison, Marc Murphy, Jordan Russell
Collingwood	Mick Malthouse	Nick Maxwell	Scott Pendlebury (vc), Dane Swan (deputy vc), Luke Ball, Darren Jolly, Harry O'Brien, Heath Shaw
Essendon	James Hird	Jobe Watson	Dustin Fletcher, Heath Hocking, Mark McVeigh, Brent Stanton, Andrew Welsh (vc)
Fremantle	Mark Harvey	Matthew Pavlich	Aaron Sandilands, David Mundy, Paul Duffield, Luke McPharlin, Garrick Ibbotson, Chris Mayne and Matt de Boer
Gold Coast	Guy McKenna	Gary Ablett, Jr.	Nathan Bock (vc), Campbell Brown (deputy vc), Michael Rischitelli, Daniel Harris, Maverick Weller, Zac Smith and Marc Lock
Geelong	Chris Scott	Cameron Ling	Joel Selwood(vc), Jimmy Bartel, Joel Corey, Corey Enright, James Kelly, Harry Taylor
Hawthorn	Alastair Clarkson	Luke Hodge	Jarryd Roughead, Jordan Lewis
Melbourne	Dean Bailey (Rds 1–19); Todd Viney (Rds 20–24)	Brad Green	Aaron Davey, Jack Grimes, Nathan Jones, Brent Moloney and Jared Rivers
North Melbourne	Brad Scott	Brent Harvey	Brady Rawlings (vc) and Drew Petrie (vc)
Port Adelaide	Matthew Primus	Domenic Cassisi	
Richmond	Damien Hardwick	Chris Newman	
St Kilda	Ross Lyon	Nick Riewoldt	Lenny Hayes
Sydney	John Longmire	Adam Goodes, Jarrad McVeigh	
West Coast	John Worsfold	Darren Glass	Beau Waters (vc) Scott Selwood, Andrew Embley, Mark LeCras, Dean Cox, Adam Selwood, Matt Priddis, Josh Kennedy and Shannon Hurn
Western Bulldogs	Rodney Eade (Rds 1–21); Paul Williams (Rds 22–24)	Matthew Boyd	Daniel Giansiracusa (vc) and Adam Cooney (vc)

== Umpiring and rule changes ==
- The AFL introduced a new interchange rule. The standard interchange system was reduced from four players to three players. A fourth player is named as a substitute, and begins the game wearing a green vest. The substitute can be brought on at any point in the game, permanently replacing any player on the bench or the field. The player being replaced must wear a red vest when leaving the ground. This rule was predominantly introduced to keep the number of players able to participate in the game for each team equal, even if a severe injury occurs.
- The rules for calling "advantage" after a free kick were amended, to allow the players, rather than the umpires, make the decision on whether or not they see an advantage in continuous play.

== Club membership ==
2011 AFL membership figures
Club	Members	Change from 2010	% Change from 2010
Adelaide	44,719	▼826	▼1.81%
Brisbane Lions	20,792	▼5,987	▼22.36%
Carlton	43,791	▲3,311	▲8.18%
Collingwood	71,271	▲13,863	▲24.15%
Essendon	42,559	▲1,970	▲4.85%
Fremantle	42,762	▲2,908	▲7.30%
Geelong	39,343	▼983	▼2.44%
Gold Coast	11,141	—N/a	—N/a
Hawthorn	56,224	▲2,246	▲4.16%
Melbourne	36,937	▲3,579	▲10.73%
North Melbourne	28,761	▲1,808	▲6.71%
Port Adelaide	32,581	▲3,489	▲11.99%
Richmond	40,184	▲4,224	▲11.75%
St Kilda	39,276	▲255	▲0.65%
Sydney	27,106	▼1,565	▼5.46%
West Coast	43,216	▼944	▼2.14%
Western Bulldogs	29,710	▼2,367	▼7.38%
Total	650,373	▲36,122	▲5.88%

== Coach changes ==
Coach	Club	Date	Notes	Caretaker	New coach
Neil Craig	Adelaide	25 July 2011	Resigned following the round 18 loss to St Kilda.	Mark Bickley	Brenton Sanderson
Dean Bailey	Melbourne	31 July 2011	Sacked following the round 19 loss to Geelong.	Todd Viney	Mark Neeld
Rodney Eade	Western Bulldogs	17 August 2011	Contract was not renewed at end of season.	Paul Williams	Brendan McCartney
Mark Harvey	Fremantle	15 September 2011	Sacked at end of season.	N/A	Ross Lyon
Ross Lyon	St Kilda	15 September 2011	Left to coach Fremantle.	Robert Harvey (interim)	Scott Watters
Mick Malthouse	Collingwood	1 October 2011	Succession plan established in 2009, Malthouse quits Collingwood after Grand Final.	N/A	Nathan Buckley

== Club overviews ==
- 2011 Adelaide Football Club season
- 2011 Brisbane Lions season
- 2011 Carlton Football Club season
- 2011 Collingwood Football Club season
- 2011 Essendon Football Club season
- 2011 Fremantle Football Club season
- 2011 Geelong Football Club season
- 2011 Gold Coast Football Club season
- 2011 Hawthorn Football Club season
- 2011 Melbourne Football Club season
- 2011 Port Adelaide Football Club season
- 2011 Richmond Football Club season
- 2011 St Kilda Football Club season
- 2011 West Coast Eagles season
- 2011 Western Bulldogs season
