= 2011 AFL Grand Final =

Grand final of the 2011 Australian Football League season

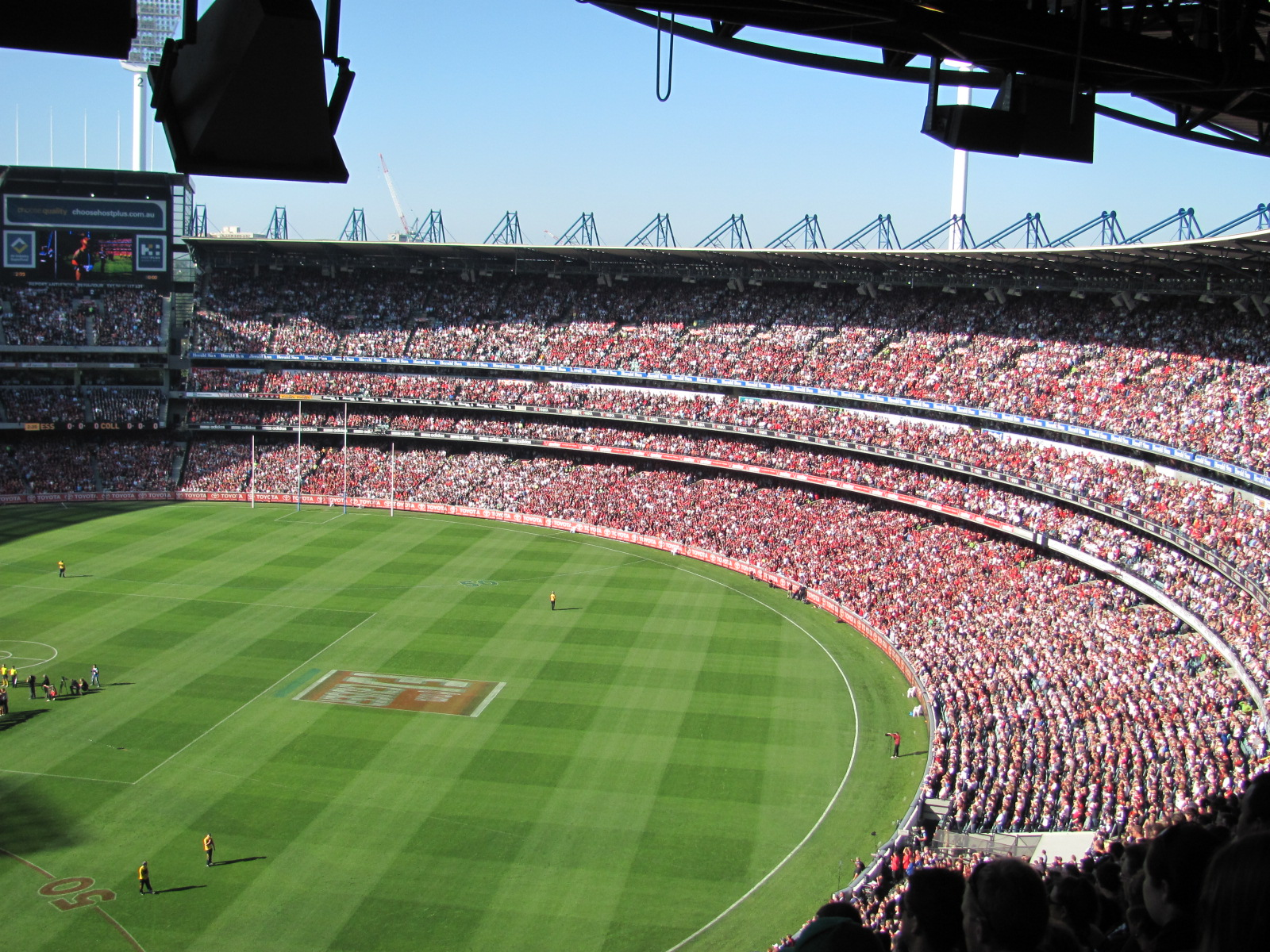
- The Melbourne Cricket Ground (pictured), where the 2011 AFL Grand Final was played.

Collingwood	Geelong
12.9 (81)	18.11 (119)
	1	2	3	4
COL	4.2 (26)	9.3 (57)	12.6 (78)	12.9 (81)
GEE	4.3 (27)	8.6 (54)	13.7 (85)	18.11 (119)
- Date: 1 October 2011, 2.30pm
- Stadium: Melbourne Cricket Ground
- Attendance: 99,537
- Favourite: Geelong
- Umpires: C. Donlon, B. Rosebury, S. Ryan
- Coin toss won by: Geelong
- Kicked toward: Punt Road End

Ceremonies
- Pre-match entertainment: Meat Loaf
- National anthem: Vanessa Amorosi

Accolades
- Norm Smith Medallist: Jimmy Bartel (Geelong)
- Jock McHale Medallist: Chris Scott (Geelong)

Broadcast in Australia
- Network: Network Ten
- Commentators: Stephen Quartermain (Host); Anthony Hudson (Commentator); Matthew Lloyd (Expert Commentator); Luke Darcy (Expert Commentator); Andrew Maher (Boundary Rider); Mark Howard (Boundary Rider)

The 2011 AFL Grand Final was an Australian rules football game contested between the Collingwood Football Club and the Geelong Football Club, held at the Melbourne Cricket Ground on 1 October 2011. It was the 116th annual grand final of the Australian Football League (formerly the Victorian Football League), staged to determine the premiers for the 2011 AFL season. The match, attended by 99,537 spectators, was won by Geelong by a margin of 38 points, marking the club's ninth VFL/AFL premiership victory. Geelong's Jimmy Bartel was awarded the Norm Smith Medal as the best player on the ground.

== Background ==
Collingwood entered the 2011 season as the reigning premiers, having defeated St Kilda in the 2010 AFL Grand Final Replay. Collingwood were the best performed side of the home and away season again, winning 14 games in a row in the latter part of the season, to finish with a record of 20–2, and its second consecutive minor premiership and McClelland Trophy. Collingwood progressed to the grand final after two hard-fought finals matches: beating West Coast by 20 points in a qualifying final; then coming back from a four-goal third quarter deficit to defeat Hawthorn by three points in a preliminary final.

Geelong entered the season after finishing third in 2010, and under a new coach, Chris Scott, after dual premiership coach Mark Thompson moved to Essendon. Geelong won its first 13 games in 2011, before finishing with a record of 19–3 to sit second on the ladder. The Cats had comfortable finals wins, over Hawthorn by 31 points and West Coast by 48 points, to qualify for the grand final.

Collingwood and Geelong met twice during the 2011 home and away season, with Geelong winning both games; these were Collingwood's only two losses for the home-and-away season. In round 8, Geelong won a close game in spite of inaccurate goalkicking, with the final score 8.17 (65) to 9.8 (62). In round 24, Geelong inflicted Collingwood's heaviest defeat for more than six years, winning 22.17 (149) to 8.5 (53) by 96 points – although as the top four positions were all decided by the end of round 23, the round 24 match was a dead rubber.

This grand final marked the 41st season in which Collingwood contested a VFL/AFL grand final.^{Note 1} The club was attempting to win its 16th VFL/AFL premiership, which would have drawn it level with Carlton and Essendon for the most premierships in league history. It was Geelong's 17th grand final appearance, with the club attempting to win its ninth premiership overall. It was Geelong's fourth grand final appearance in five seasons, with the club attempting to win its third of those contests. It was the first time since 1998 that the premiers from the previous two seasons played in the grand final.

This match was the sixth grand final contested between Collingwood and Geelong and the first since 1953. Three of the previous encounters were won by Geelong (1925, 1937 and 1952) and two were won by Collingwood (1930 and 1953). The two clubs had met in a preliminary final in three of the previous four seasons, with Geelong winning two (2007 and 2009) and Collingwood winning one (2010), but this was the first time in the recent success of both clubs that they had met in the grand final.

When betting markets opened on the Sunday before the game, Collingwood was a slight favourite, with major bookmaker TAB Sportsbet offering $1.80 for a Collingwood victory, compared with $2.00 for a Geelong victory. However, punters backed Geelong heavily and, by Monday, Geelong had become the slight favourite; on Thursday, Sportsbet was offering $1.80 for Geelong and $2.00 for Collingwood.

== Media coverage ==
The match was broadcast by Ten Sport on Network Ten. Controversially, the broadcast was transmitted only in standard definition, as the costs of live high-definition coverage was deemed excessive; the HD channel was instead used for golf. This was considered a major step backwards, as the drawn 2010 AFL Grand Final the previous year had not only been broadcast in HD but also in 3D. However, the game was later made available in high-definition Blu-ray.

The coverage included the match, pre-game report, post-match report and highlights. The pre-game and post-game reports were hosted by Tim Lane and Michael Christian, and the match coverage was hosted by Stephen Quartermain. The match was called by Quartermain, Anthony Hudson, Luke Darcy and Matthew Lloyd.

The match was Network Ten's final broadcast of an Australian Football League match before its broadcasting TV rights deal expired at the end of 2011; however, it was not its final AFL-sanctioned broadcast overall, with the 2011 International Rules Series broadcast under the same rights deal in October and November 2011. It was Ten's eighth grand final broadcast. The grand final had a peak audience of over 3.9 million viewers.

Network Ten (Ten Sport) won the 2012 Silver Logie award for Most Popular Sports Program—that being the 2011 AFL Grand Final.

== Pre-match entertainment ==
Pre-match entertainment was provided by American singer Meat Loaf, who performed a 12½-minute medley of his best-known songs. Meat Loaf's vocal performance, which was largely off-key, was widely panned by commentators; it was later reported that he had been suffering health issues, including a heart attack and a hemorrhaged vocal cord, in the weeks before the grand final which affected his performance. Nevertheless, years later the performance remains widely remembered and mocked in AFL states for its poor quality.

Vanessa Amorosi performed the national anthem, and her performance was also panned.

== Match summary ==
Geelong won the coin toss and chose to kick to the Punt Road end in the first quarter. It had rained heavily in Melbourne over the previous few days and on the morning of the game, but it was mostly played in dry conditions, with brief periods of rain in the third quarter.

=== First quarter ===
Geelong scored the opening goal of the game after only eleven seconds, with Geelong winning the first centre clearance and Travis Varcoe scoring the goal. With Brad Ottens establishing aerial supremacy in the ruck, Geelong had the better of the clearances early. When Varcoe kicked his second goal in the fourth minute of the game, Geelong led 14–0. From that point, Collingwood's backline held Geelong scoreless for fifteen minutes, and set shot goals from beyond the 50-metre arc by Travis Cloke at the 12- and 19-minute marks closed the gap to 14–13. From that point, the match was goal-for-goal in the latter stages of the quarter, with the lead changing four times: Andrew Krakouer goaled for Collingwood in the 21st minute; Steve Johnson goaled for Geelong in the 22nd minute; Luke Ball for Collingwood goaled in the 24th minute; and Joel Selwood goaled for Geelong in the 26th minute. At quarter time, Geelong led by one point, 27–26.

=== Second quarter ===
Collingwood opened the second quarter very strongly, kicking three goals in the first ten minutes (to Krakouer in the 2nd minute, Cloke in the 7th minute, and Ben Johnson in the 9th minute), to build an 18-point lead, 45–27; this would ultimately be Collingwood's biggest lead for the match. Cloke's early dominance forced Geelong to take Harry Taylor off him and make Tom Lonergan his new opponent, which helped the Cats stem the flow of goals. Mathew Stokes goaled for Geelong in the 11th minute, and Tom Hawkins and Johnson both missed opportunities to bring the margin closer; from Johnson's behind, Collingwood scored a coast-to-coast goal, with Krakouer converting from a strong contested mark, to give Collingwood a 51–35 lead at the 18th minute. At this stage, Geelong key forward James Podsiadly, who had scored one behind for the match, was stretchered from the ground with a right shoulder injury after having fallen on it in a marking contest. Podsiadly was substituted off for Mitch Duncan.

For the remainder of the quarter, Geelong closed the gap on Collingwood: Steve Johnson's goal in the 23rd minute was answered by Collingwood's Steele Sidebottom in the 24th minute. In the 28th minute, a long chain of contested play around the boundary line finished with a goal to Selwood from the goal square to narrow the margin to 9 points. Then, in the 32nd minute, Jimmy Bartel kicked a goal from a free kick, 25 metres out on the boundary line, after the Collingwood ruckman Darren Jolly was penalised for tapping the ball out on the full from a ball-up. There was no more scoring in the long second quarter (which lasted 36 minutes due to the delay for Podsiadly's injury), and Collingwood led 57–54 at half time.

=== Third quarter ===
For the first part of the third quarter, it was a goal-for-goal affair, with the lead changing five times. Geelong goaled first in the 4th minute, with Hawkins soccering the ball from a broken contest in the goal square. Collingwood's Sharrod Wellingham kicked a long goal in play from 50 metres in the 7th minute, although replays indicated that the ball had shaved the inside of the goal post, and therefore it should have been awarded a behind; incidentally, this was a year before the AFL introduced goal reviews. Hawkins for Geelong and Leigh Brown for Collingwood goaled from set shots in the 13th and 14th minutes, respectively. Bartel regained the lead for Geelong with a goal from a strong contested mark in the forward pocket in the 24th minute. Activated substitute Mitch Duncan goaled on the run from 50 metres in the 28th minute to extend Geelong's lead to eight points, and Collingwood replied swiftly from the ensuing centre clearance, with Steele Sidebottom kicking a goal from 50 m on the run. In the 31st minute, Tom Hawkins kicked his third goal of the quarter for Geelong, another soccered goal from short range. With five goals to three in the third quarter, Geelong led 85–78 by seven points.

=== Final quarter ===
Hawkins had three early opportunities to kick goals for Geelong in the 2nd, 4th and 5th minutes, all from contested marks; he missed with his first two opportunities, but he handpassed the third opportunity to Steve Johnson, who scored the goal. In the 9th minute, Varcoe was on the end of a long running play which started at full-back to kick his third goal. In the 15th minute, when Bartel goaled from a long range set-shot, the margin was out to 26 points, and a Geelong victory was no longer in doubt. Two more goals were scored by Geelong in the dying minutes—one to Steve Johnson in the 22nd minute, and one to popular captain Cameron Ling in the 24th minute—to complete a 38-point victory. Geelong scored five goals to zero in the final quarter and scored the last six goals of the match. After the 10-minute mark of the second quarter, Geelong turned an 18-point deficit into a 38-point win, a 56-point turnaround.

=== Overall report ===
The influential players in the midfield were Jimmy Bartel and Joel Selwood for Geelong, while Scott Pendlebury shone for Collingwood. Collingwood midfielder and 2011 Brownlow Medallist Dane Swan was effectively tagged by Ling, and therefore he had a limited influence on the match. The ruck contest was well won by Geelong's tandem of Ottens and Trent West, who beat Collingwood's primary ruckman Darren Jolly and his backup Leigh Brown.

In Collingwood's forward line, Travis Cloke was influential in the first half, kicking three goals while playing against Geelong defender Harry Taylor. A change of match-ups at half-time saw Tom Lonergan switched onto Cloke, and Cloke managed only one behind thereafter.

In Geelong's forward line, Tom Hawkins was credited with one of the best matches of his career. He kicked 3.2 after half-time, and he set up another to Steve Johnson, with Collingwood defender Ben Reid unable to quell his influence. Hawkins role was particularly crucial after fellow key forward James Podsiadly was substituted out of the game through injury in the second quarter. Additionally, Steve Johnson kicked four goals despite suffering a knee injury in the preliminary final, which many speculated during the week would keep him out of the match.

For the second time in three years, a goal was incorrectly awarded in the grand final for a kick which had hit the post and should have been awarded a behind: Tom Hawkins (Geelong) had been the beneficiary in the 2009 AFL Grand Final, and Sharrod Wellingham (Collingwood) in 2011. These two high-profile incidents prompted the introduction of video score reviews to AFL games from 2012.

=== Norm Smith Medal ===
Norm Smith Medal voting tally
Position	Player	Club	Total votes	Vote summary
1st (winner)	Jimmy Bartel	Geelong	13	3,1,3,3,3
2nd	Joel Selwood	Geelong	9	2,2,2,2,1
3rd	Tom Hawkins	Geelong	5	3,2
4th	Scott Pendlebury	Collingwood	2	1,1
5th	Cameron Ling	Geelong	1	1

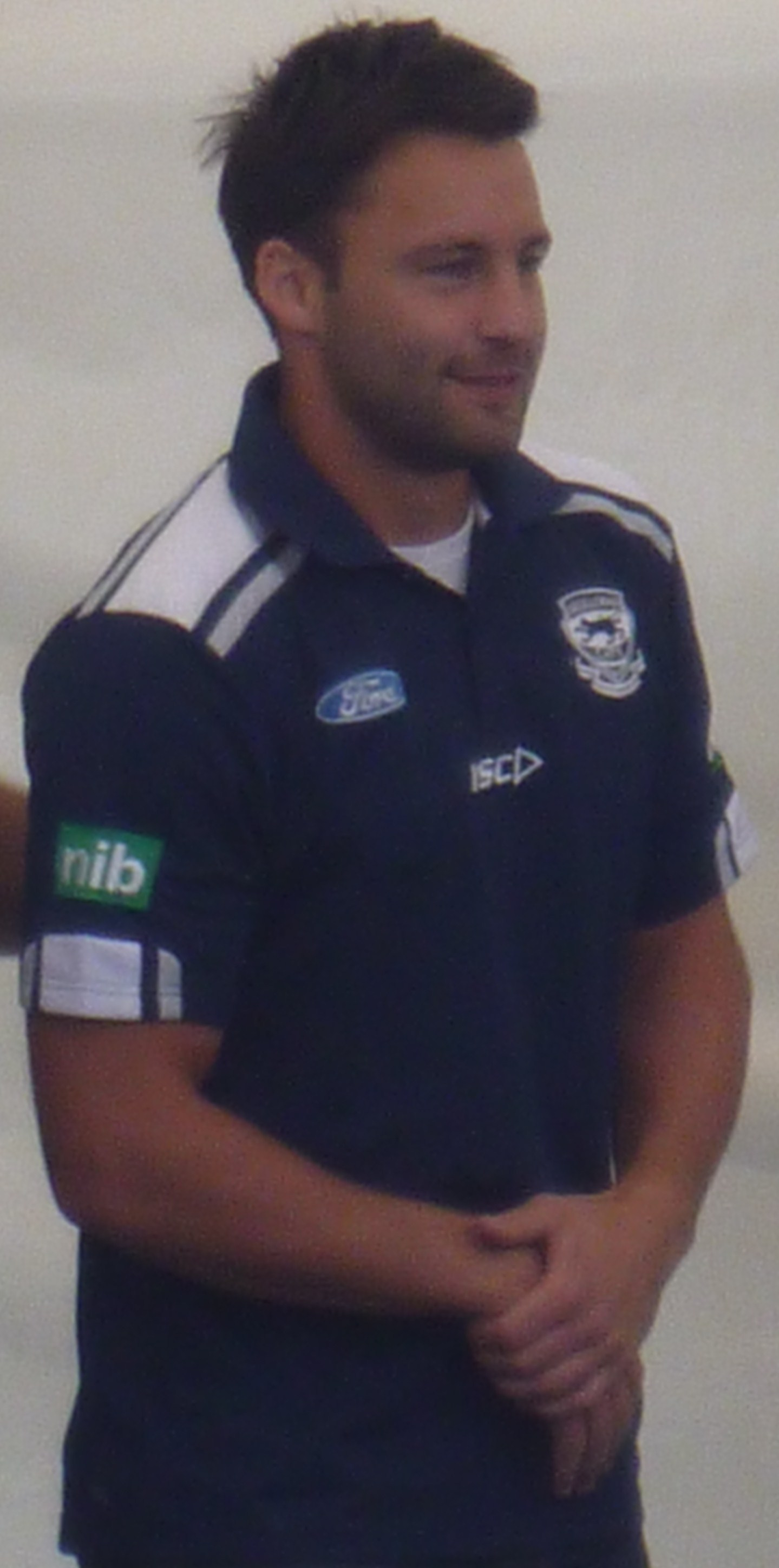
Jimmy Bartel at Geelong's 2011 AFL Premiership victory parade.

The Norm Smith Medal was won by Geelong's Jimmy Bartel, who had 26 disposals and kicked three goals. Bartel scored 13 of a possible 15 votes to win the award, including being voted best on ground by four of the five judges. Bartel became the fifth player to win a Brownlow Medal, premiership medallion and Norm Smith Medal in his career.

Joel Selwood (28 disposals, two goals) finished second with nine votes, and Tom Hawkins (19 disposals, nine marks, three goals) finished third with five votes, including the other best-on-ground vote. Scott Pendlebury (two votes) and Cameron Ling (one vote) were the other vote-getters.

Chaired by Rodney Eade, the voters and their choices are as follows:

Voter	Voter	3 votes	2 votes	1 vote
Rodney Eade	Former AFL Player & Coach	Jimmy Bartel	Joel Selwood	Scott Pendlebury
Matt Granland	SEN	Tom Hawkins	Joel Selwood	Jimmy Bartel
Garry Lyon	Triple M	Jimmy Bartel	Joel Selwood	Scott Pendlebury
Bruce Matthews	Herald Sun	Jimmy Bartel	Joel Selwood	Cameron Ling
Matthew Richardson	3AW	Jimmy Bartel	Tom Hawkins	Joel Selwood

=== Result ===
The premiership was the ninth VFL/AFL premiership in Geelong's history and the third premiership in five years. Twelve Geelong players – Bartel, Ottens, Ling, Johnson, Selwood, Matthew Scarlett, Paul Chapman, Andrew Mackie, James Kelly, Joel Corey, David Wojcinski and Corey Enright – became the first triple-premiership players in the club's VFL/AFL history. Geelong coach Chris Scott became the first man since Alan Joyce in 1988 to win the premiership in his first year as senior coach at a club and, at 35 years of age, the youngest premiership coach since Alex Jesaulenko in 1979.

== Scorecard ==
Grand final
Saturday, 1 October (2:30 pm)	Collingwood	def. by	Geelong	MCG (crowd: 99,537)	Report
4.2 (26); 9.3 (57); 12.6 (78); 12.9 (81)	Q1; Q2; Q3; Final	4.3 (27); 8.6 (54); 13.7 (85); 18.11 (119)	Umpires: C. Donlon, B. Rosebury, S. Ryan; Norm Smith Medal: Jimmy Bartel (Geelong); Television broadcast: Network Ten; National anthem: Vanessa Amorosi
Cloke 3, Krakouer 3, Sidebottom 2, Ball, Brown, Johnson, Wellingham	Goals	Johnson 4, Bartel 3, Hawkins 3, Varcoe 3, Selwood 2, Duncan, Ling, Stokes
Pendlebury, Thomas, Sidebottom, Tarrant, Ball, Brown, Cloke	Best	Bartel, Selwood, Hawkins, Ling, Johnson, Chapman, Ottens, Varcoe
Nil	Injuries	Podsiadly (shoulder)

== Teams ==
The teams were named on Thursday, 29 September.

Collingwood

Collingwood
B:	34 Alan Toovey	20 Ben Reid	8 Harry O'Brien
HB:	5 Nick Maxwell (c)	2 Chris Tarrant	39 Heath Shaw
C:	11 Jarryd Blair	36 Dane Swan	13 Dale Thomas
HF:	26 Ben Johnson	15 Leigh Brown	4 Alan Didak
F:	22 Steele Sidebottom	32 Travis Cloke	12 Luke Ball
Foll:	18 Darren Jolly	10 Scott Pendlebury	7 Andrew Krakouer
Int:	1 Leon Davis	31 Chris Dawes	21 Sharrod Wellingham
Int:	35 Alex Fasolo (sub)		
Coach:	Mick Malthouse		

Geelong

Geelong
B:	8 Josh Hunt	30 Matthew Scarlett	13 Tom Lonergan
HB:	44 Corey Enright	7 Harry Taylor	40 David Wojcinski
C:	14 Joel Selwood	3 Jimmy Bartel	4 Andrew Mackie
HF:	20 Steve Johnson	26 Tom Hawkins	5 Travis Varcoe
F:	12 Trent West	31 James Podsiadly	35 Paul Chapman
Foll:	6 Brad Ottens	45 Cameron Ling (c)	11 Joel Corey
Int:	9 James Kelly	27 Mathew Stokes	28 Allen Christensen
Int:	22 Mitch Duncan (sub)		
Coach:	Chris Scott		

=== Umpires ===
The umpiring panel for the grand final, including nine match day umpires and three emergencies, was announced on Tuesday, 27 September. Among the umpires were three grand final debutants: field umpire Chris Donlon, and boundary umpires Nathan Doig and Christopher Gordon.

2011 AFL Grand Final umpires
Position	Umpire 1	Umpire 2	Umpire 3	Umpire 4	Emergency
Field:	1 Chris Donlon (1)	8 Brett Rosebury (4)	25 Shaun Ryan (5)		Matt Stevic
Boundary:	Nathan Doig (1)	Mark Foster (4)	Christopher Gordon (1)	Mark Thomson (4)	Jonathon Creasey
Goal:	David Dixon (6)	Luke Walker (3)			Chelsea Roffey

Numbers in brackets represent the number of grand finals umpired; this number includes 2011, counts the 2010 AFL Grand Final and Replay separately, and does not include times selected as an emergency umpire.

== See also ==
- 2011 NAB Cup
- 2011 AFL season
- 2011 AFL finals series
- 2011 NRL Grand Final

== Footnotes ==
1. It was Collingwood's 43rd grand final appearance overall, if the replayed grand finals of 1977 and 2010 are counted separately to the drawn grand finals in the same years.

== Notes ==
^{a} While the 2020 and 2021 grand finals were contested between Richmond and Geelong, and Melbourne and the Western Bulldogs, these two matches were played at the Gabba in Brisbane and Optus Stadium in Perth respectively due to separate, ongoing COVID-19 lockdowns in Victoria which prevented these matches from being played at the Melbourne Cricket Ground.
