= Leigh Brown =

Australian rules footballer (born 1982)

Personal information
- Full name: Leigh Brown
- Nickname: The Anvil The Freight Train Big Bad Leroy Brown
- Born: 23 February 1982 (age 44)
- Original team: Gippsland Power (TAC Cup)
- Draft: No. 5, 1999 National Draft, Fremantle; No. 73, 2008 National Draft, Collingwood
- Height: 194 cm (6 ft 4 in)
- Weight: 104 kg (229 lb)
- Position: Forward / Ruckman

Playing career^{1}
Years	Club	Games (Goals)
2000–2002	Fremantle	63 (20)
2003–2008	North Melbourne	118 (64)
2009–2011	Collingwood	65 (54)
Total		246 (138)
- ^{1} Playing statistics correct to the end of 2011.

Career highlights
- Collingwood premiership player 2010; Rising Star

Leigh Brown (born 23 February 1982) is a former Australian rules football player who played for Fremantle, North Melbourne and finally Collingwood in the Australian Football League. He is a Collingwood premiership player. After the 2011 Grand Final Brown retired and was announced as Melbourne's forward coach. He is renowned for his tackling ability as well as his positional versatility.

== Early life ==
Brown is originally from Heyfield and played under 18 football with the Gippsland Power in the TAC Cup where he attracted the attention of talent scouts.

Brown was drafted to the Fremantle Dockers with the fifth selection in the 1999 AFL draft.

== AFL career ==
=== Fremantle ===
He made his AFL debut in 2000, playing 21 out of a possible 22 games in his debut year. He would play a further 21 games in each of the next two seasons and was named Fremantle's Best Clubman in 2001. He played 63 games at Fremantle also kicking 20 goals.

=== North Melbourne ===
Brown moved to the North Melbourne after being traded in 2002 for selection 13, which Fremantle used to draft Byron Schammer. He continued to be solid key position player who could hold his own at both ends of the ground. Prior to 2008, Brown had played in at least 21 matches in every season of his AFL career. Brown was delisted by the Kangaroos at the end of 2008. At North Melbourne Brown played 118 games and booted 64 goals.

=== Collingwood ===
Brown was recruited to Collingwood after the 2008 season with selection 73 in the national draft. He played 23 games for Collingwood in 2009 and kicked 10 goals.

His 2010 season was extremely productive, to the point of holding former No. 1 Draft pick Josh Fraser out of the team. He has played a variety of roles, earning him the title "Mr Fix It" from Malcolm Blight and numerous commentators. Perhaps his best effort came against St Kilda, where he booted 3 goals and lead his team to a great victory to see them take top place on the AFL ladder heading into the Finals series. Brown capped off a memorable year in 2010 by playing an important role in Collingwood's Premiership victory.

On 1 September 2011, Brown announced his retirement, effective from the end of the season.

=== Coaching ===
In 2011, Brown accepted a role from Melbourne Football Club to be their forward line coach. In November 2013, Brown accepted an offer to coach TAC Cup Under 18 team Gippsland Power for the 2014 season (replacing Nick Stevens).

== Statistics ==
Legend
G	Goals	K	Kicks	D	Disposals	T	Tackles
B	Behinds	H	Handballs	M	Marks	H/O	Hit-outs

Season	Team	No.	Games	Totals								Averages (per game)							
Season	Team	No.	Games	G	B	K	H	D	M	T	H/O	G	B	K	H	D	M	T	H/O
2000	Fremantle	30	21	2	1	111	52	163	54	19	5	0.1	0.0	5.3	2.5	7.8	2.6	0.9	0.2
2001	Fremantle	30	21	8	6	151	69	220	82	22	20	0.4	0.3	7.2	3.3	10.5	3.9	1.0	1.0
2002	Fremantle	30	21	10	8	132	82	214	75	35	20	0.5	0.4	6.3	3.9	10.2	3.6	1.7	1.0
2003	Kangaroos	16	22	10	6	135	70	205	75	35	50	0.5	0.3	6.1	3.2	9.3	3.4	1.6	2.3
2004	Kangaroos	16	21	15	9	141	97	238	73	44	73	0.7	0.4	6.7	4.6	11.3	3.5	2.1	3.5
2005	Kangaroos	16	23	3	4	127	107	234	88	29	12	0.1	0.2	5.5	4.7	10.2	3.8	1.3	0.5
2006	Kangaroos	16	21	8	5	163	126	289	117	30	13	0.4	0.2	7.8	6.0	13.8	5.6	1.4	0.6
2007	Kangaroos	16	22	21	16	124	102	226	78	38	17	1.0	0.7	5.6	4.6	10.3	3.5	1.7	0.8
2008	North Melbourne	16	9	7	6	51	60	111	36	22	9	0.8	0.7	5.7	6.7	12.3	4.0	2.4	1.0
2009	Collingwood	15	23	10	17	124	123	247	76	68	79	0.4	0.7	5.4	5.3	10.7	3.3	3.0	3.4
2010	Collingwood	15	19	21	10	131	101	232	86	78	93	1.1	0.5	6.9	5.3	12.2	4.5	4.1	4.9
2011	Collingwood	15	23	23	17	160	122	282	86	82	120	1.0	0.7	7.0	5.3	12.3	3.7	3.6	5.2
Career			246	138	105	1550	1111	2661	926	502	511	0.6	0.4	6.3	4.5	10.8	3.8	2.0	2.1
