= Mitch Duncan =

Australian rules footballer

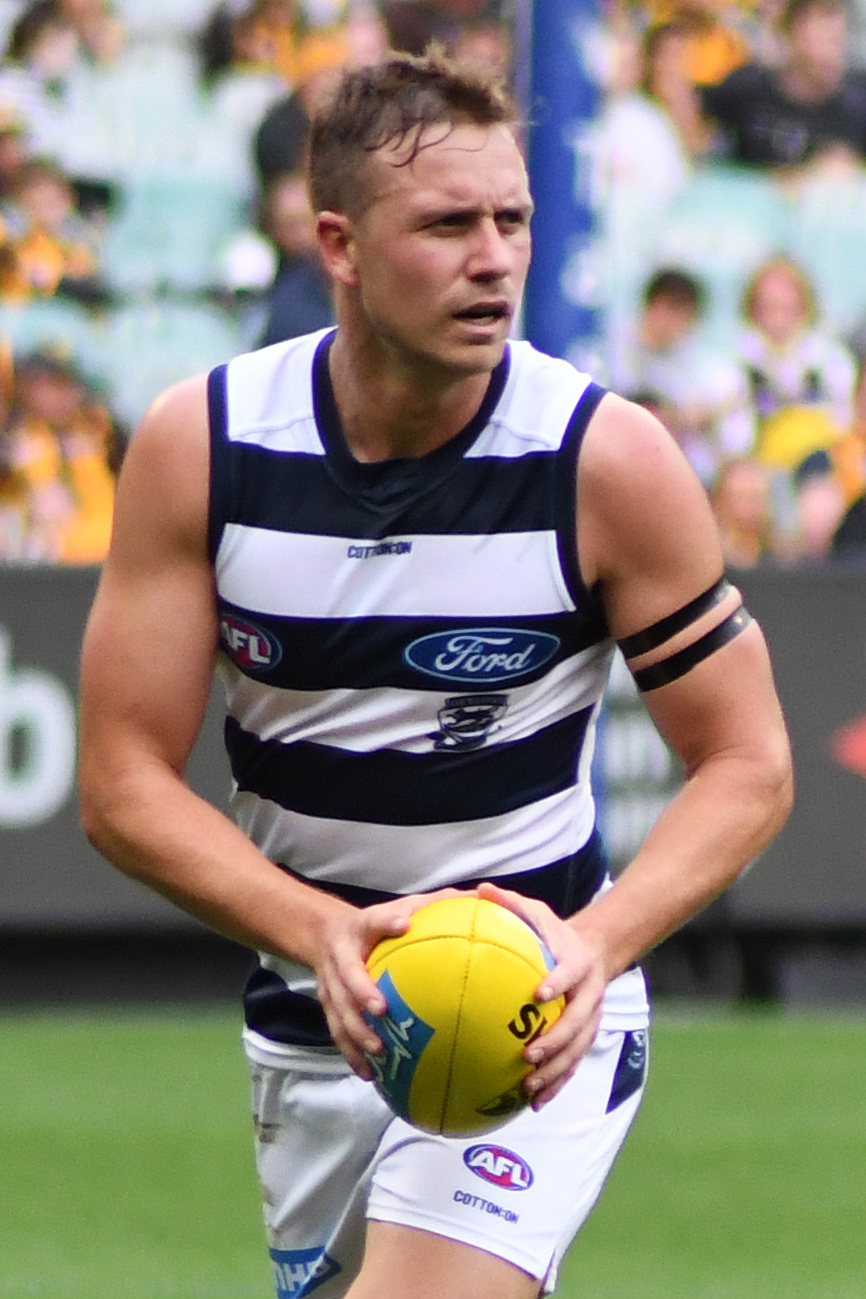
- Duncan playing for Geelong in April 2019

Personal information
- Full name: Mitchell James Duncan
- Nicknames: Flid, Peepsie
- Born: 10 June 1991 (age 35); Perth, Western Australia
- Original team: East Perth (WAFL)
- Draft: 28th overall, 2009; Geelong
- Height: 188 cm (6 ft 2 in)
- Weight: 88 kg (194 lb)
- Position: Midfielder / Forward

Playing career
Years	Club	Games (Goals)
2010–2025	Geelong	305 (185)

Career highlights
- 2× AFL premiership player (2011, 2022); 2011 AFL Rising Star nominee

Mitchell James Duncan (born 10 June 1991) is a former professional Australian rules footballer who played for the Geelong Football Club in the Australian Football League (AFL).

A standout junior footballer, Duncan entered top-level football early by signing for East Perth Football Club in the WAFL at the age of sixteen years. His accomplishments as a junior included winning a national championship with Western Australia, achieving All-Australian honours, selection for Australia in the International Rules Series, and being awarded an AIS-AFL Academy scholarship. Following a decorated junior career, Duncan was selected with Geelong's second pick, and twenty-eighth overall, in the 2009 AFL draft.

Duncan made his AFL debut in 2010, and was nominated at the conclusion of the season for the AFLPA Best First Year Player Award.

== Early life ==
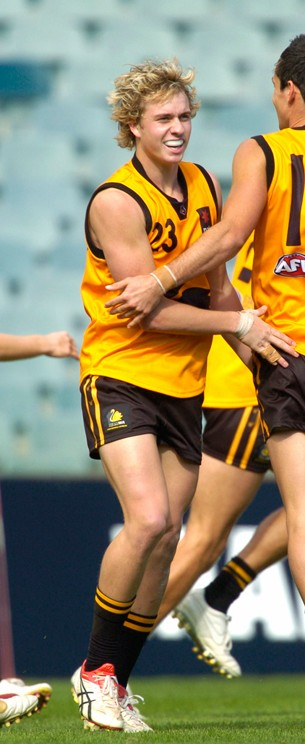
Duncan playing for Western Australia in May 2009

Duncan was born in Perth, Western Australia. He attended Carine Senior High School and Trinity College. Duncan is the son of former East Fremantle player Glen Rogers. Playing school football alongside future AFL players Kane Lucas and Travis Colyer, Duncan helped Trinity College capture the Alcock Cup—Perth's private school football tournament—in 2007. Duncan progressed from school football to sign for East Perth Football Club at the age of sixteen years. He achieved State honours for Western Australia in the under-16s AFL National Championships during 2007, captaining the state side and leading the team in total disposals. Duncan's promising junior performances were rewarded when he received a scholarship within the prestigious AIS-AFL Academy as part of the 2008 intake. As an academy member, he subsequently participated in the squad tour to South Africa. The following season, Duncan achieved State honours for Western Australian as a bottom-aged player during the AFL National Championships.

At the age of just 17, Duncan was selected to play senior football for East Perth at the beginning of the 2009 WAFL season. However, a knee injury occurred in the first round of the season forced him to delay further appearances in the senior side. Despite this setback, Duncan's performances for the East Perth under-18s team upon his return again saw him elevated to the senior team for the remainder of the season.

Duncan again received mid-year State honours for Western Australia in the AFL National Championships, and was named vice-captain of the squad. His performances in the championships—during which he averaged 20 disposals at a team-high 75% efficiency, ranked third overall for total marks, and kicked eight goals—earned him end-of-year All-Australian honours and helped Western Australia capture the 2009 national championship.

Duncan's performances throughout the season saw him rewarded with an invite to the AFL Draft Camp, where he impressed recruiters by placing in the top 15 percent for the agility run, the top 12 per cent for the three-kilometre time trial and achieving a level of 14.1 in the beep test.

== AFL career ==
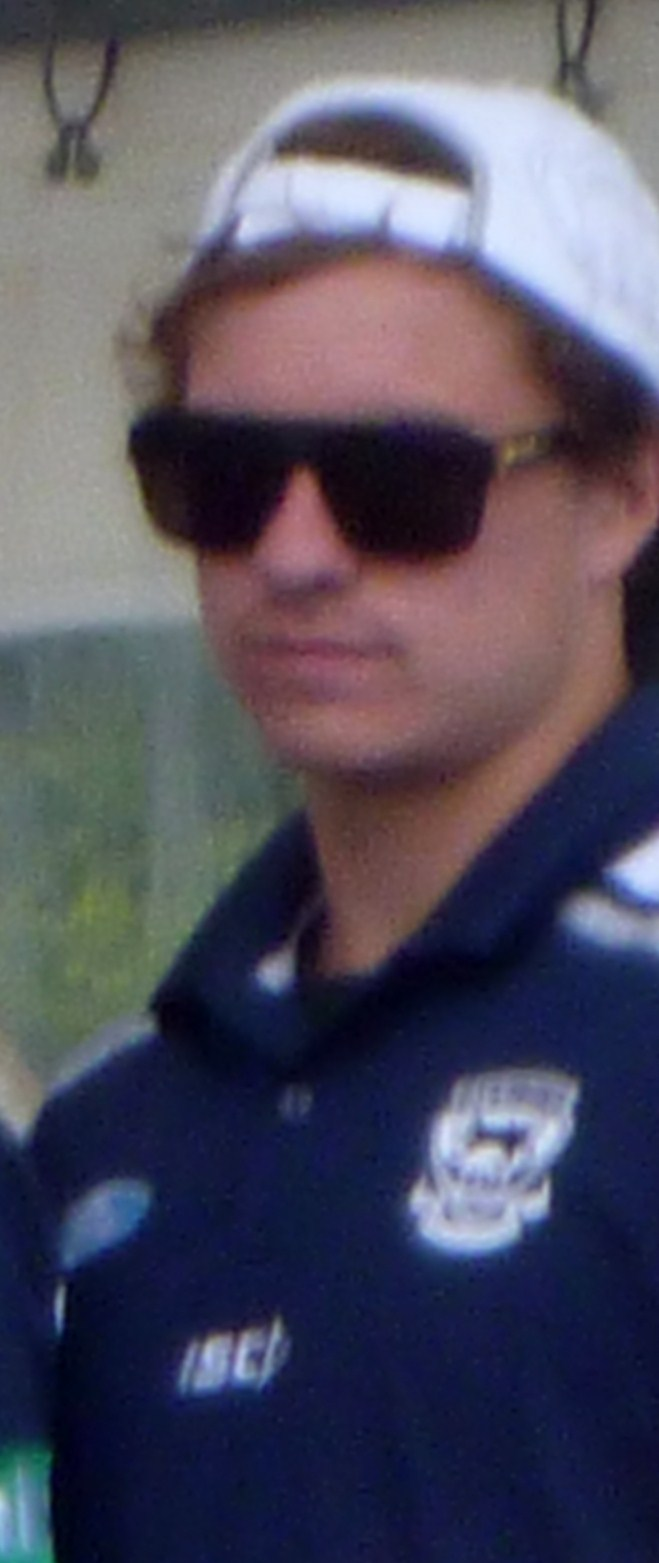
Duncan at Geelong's 2011 premiership victory parade.

Duncan was drafted by the Geelong Football Club with their second selection, and was the twenty-eighth overall draft pick in the 2009 AFL draft.

=== 2010 season ===
Duncan made his first appearance for the club during the 2010 NAB Cup, recording 14 disposals, four inside-50s, and two goals on debut. He made his senior debut in the opening round of the 2010 AFL season, recording 10 disposals and 6 tackles against his childhood team Essendon. During a round four fixture against Port Adelaide, Duncan recorded a career–high 20 disposals and 9 marks to help Geelong achieve a 95-point victory. In total, Duncan made 8 senior appearances during his debut season and finished the year ranked third amongst all first-year players in marks per game (5.4), sixth in goals per game (1.0), and sixth in goal assists per game (1.0). His impressive performances throughout the year saw him nominated by his peers for the AFLPA Best First Year Award.

=== 2011 season ===
In round three against Port Adelaide he tallied 24 disposals and kicked two long-range goals and was rewarded with the round 3 nomination for the 2011 AFL Rising Star Award.

Duncan's season continued strongly, playing in all but one game, including selections into Geelong's finals teams, and was also selected into the 2011 Grand Final Team as a substitute. He entered the match after forward James Podsiadly dislocated his shoulder. Duncan played an important role gathering 10 possessions and scoring a goal at the 27-minute mark of the third quarter. The Geelong Cats played hard contested football in the fourth quarter and kicked five goals and kept Collingwood goal-less, giving Geelong the 2011 Premiership and Duncan his first Premiership Medallion; the first won by a substitute – introduced in the AFL Rules in 2011.

== Player profile ==
Duncan is regarded as a versatile utility player, capable of featuring as a forward or within the midfield. As a lead-up forward, he is noted for his strong marking ability and his role in linking-up plays around the ground. Kevin Sheehan has complimented Duncan on possessing "good foot skills ... on both sides of the body", while showing an "ability to read the game to advantage ... and make excellent decisions".

Duncan's teammate Joel Corey has also acknowledged his maturity and professionalism, likening his game-day approach to that of Joel Selwood.

In 2014, Duncan began writing a regular Saturday column in the sports section of the Geelong Advertiser. His column brings a fresh perspective to the Geelong Advertiser's sports coverage and is known for its hard hitting style.

== Honours and achievements ==
Team

- 2× AFL premiership player (Geelong): 2011, 2022
- 2× McClelland Trophy (Geelong): 2019, 2022

Individual

- AFL Rising Star nominee: 2011 (round 3)

== Statistics ==
Legend
G	Goals	K	Kicks	D	Disposals	T	Tackles
B	Behinds	H	Handballs	M	Marks
#	Played in that season's premiership team

Season	Team	No.	Games	Totals							Averages (per game)							Votes
Season	Team	No.	Games	G	B	K	H	D	M	T	G	B	K	H	D	M	T	Votes
2010	Geelong	22	8	8	6	67	42	109	43	18	1.0	0.8	8.4	5.3	13.6	5.4	2.3	0
2011^{#}	Geelong	22	21	22	10	192	165	357	100	49	1.0	0.5	9.1	7.9	17.0	4.8	2.3	0
2012	Geelong	22	22	20	12	262	138	400	122	68	0.9	0.5	11.9	6.3	18.2	5.5	3.1	2
2013	Geelong	22	25	14	16	310	216	526	161	72	0.6	0.6	12.4	8.6	21.0	6.4	2.9	5
2014	Geelong	22	24	23	10	302	245	547	151	78	1.0	0.4	12.6	10.2	22.8	6.3	3.3	12
2015	Geelong	22	11	8	3	105	130	235	62	26	0.7	0.3	9.5	11.8	21.4	5.6	2.4	6
2016	Geelong	22	24	9	13	285	264	549	130	110	0.4	0.5	11.9	11.0	22.9	5.4	4.6	2
2017	Geelong	22	24	15	13	344	354	698	158	128	0.6	0.5	14.3	14.8	29.1	6.6	5.3	11
2018	Geelong	22	21	7	8	315	238	553	133	74	0.3	0.4	15.0	11.3	26.3	6.3	3.5	4
2019	Geelong	22	23	20	6	340	241	581	172	68	0.9	0.3	14.8	10.5	25.3	7.5	3.0	11
2020 (Note: The 2020 season was played with 17 home-and-away matches per team (down from 22) and 16-minute quarters with time on (down from 20-minute quarters with time on) due to the impact of the COVID-19 pandemic.)	Geelong	22	20	13	8	262	144	406	123	68	0.7	0.4	13.1	7.2	20.3	6.2	3.4	5
2021	Geelong	22	13	8	2	200	115	315	98	33	0.6	0.2	15.4	8.8	24.2	7.5	2.5	4
2022^{#}	Geelong	22	22	9	7	342	173	515	184	35	0.4	0.3	15.5	7.9	23.4	8.4	1.6	4
2023	Geelong	22	16	5	5	224	135	359	110	40	0.3	0.3	14.0	8.4	22.4	6.9	2.5	2
2024	Geelong	22	22	3	7	278	133	411	124	42	0.1	0.3	12.6	6.0	18.7	5.6	1.9	0
2025	Geelong	22	9	1	1	76	40	116	38	13	0.1	0.1	8.4	4.4	12.9	4.2	1.4	0
Career			305	185	127	3904	2773	6677	1909	922	0.6	0.4	12.8	9.1	21.9	6.3	3.0	68
