= Shaun Ryan =

Australian rules football umpire (born 1975)

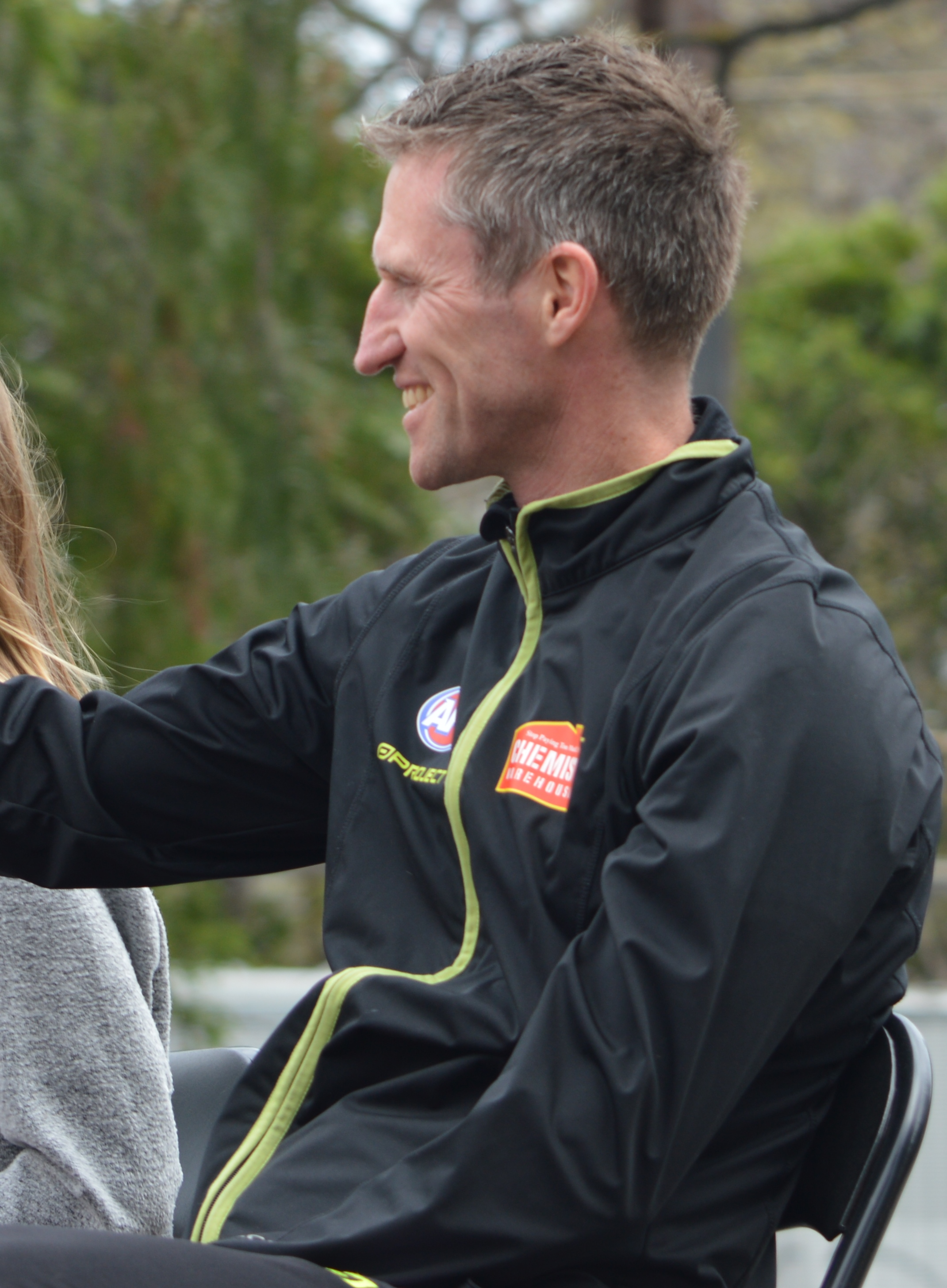
- Ryan in the 2019 AFL Grand Final Parade

Personal information
- Born: 1975 (age 50–51); Warrnambool
- Other occupation: Barrister

Umpiring career
Years	League	Role	Games
2003–2011; 2015–2020	AFL	Field umpire	350

Shaun Ryan is a former Australian rules football field umpire in the Australian Football League.

== Biography ==
Born in 1975, Ryan studied at Warrnambool's Christian Brothers' College and Emmanuel College before heading to Geelong's Deakin University, where he graduated with both arts and law degrees.

== Career ==
Considered one of the league's best umpires of his time, Ryan umpired in five Grand Finals between 2008 and 2011 (which included both the drawn Grand Final and replay in 2010) before temporarily retiring at the end of 2011 after 215 games. He returned to senior umpiring in 2015 after three years hiatus, and umpired his sixth Grand Final in 2017, and his seventh in 2018.

He officiated his final AFL match in the preliminary final clash between the Brisbane Lions and Geelong at the Gabba in October 2020.
