= Sharrod Wellingham =

Australian rules footballer (born 1988)

Personal information
- Full name: Sharrod Sebastian Bradford Wellingham
- Born: 7 July 1988 (age 38); Western Australia
- Original team: South Perth / Perth (WAFL)
- Draft: No. 10, 2007 rookie draft
- Height: 185 cm (6 ft 1 in)
- Weight: 85 kg (187 lb)
- Position: Midfielder/defender

Playing career^{1}
| Years | Club | Games (Goals) |
| 2007–2012 | Collingwood | 92 (55) |
| 2013–2017 | West Coast | 79 (18) |
| Total | | 171 (73) |
- ^{1} Playing statistics correct to the end of 2017.

Career highlights
- Collingwood premiership player 2010

Sharrod Sebastian Bradford Wellingham (born 7 July 1988) is a former professional Australian rules footballer who played for the Collingwood Football Club and the West Coast Eagles in the Australian Football League (AFL).

A pacy wingman from Western Australia, Wellingham became the fifth Indigenous footballer on the Magpies list having been selected with the 10th pick in the 2006 AFL Rookie draft.

Wellingham's initial season at the club was spent with Collingwood's VFL affiliate side, Williamstown. Due to VFL limits on the number of AFL-listed players eligible for selection against non AFL-affiliated clubs, Wellingham was demoted to the Williamstown reserves towards the end of 2007. Despite this Wellingham was promoted to the Collingwood senior list to replace Chris Egan. Despite being named an emergency in round 19 against Richmond, he did not make his Collingwood debut in 2007 and was subsequently demoted back to 'rookie' status. He survived the cut post-season, and remained on the Collingwood 2008 rookie list. He then switched guernsey numbers, switching from the lowly 41 to Guy Richards' old number 21.

In January 2008, Collingwood lost their sponsorship from the Transport Accident Commission after Wellingham was charged with drink-driving. Wellingham was moving a car 100 metres up the road (so he says, the other AFL players with him had been drinking) after being out on Saturday 5 January, when he was pulled over by the police. The club fined him $5000.

Before the 2008 Anzac Day Clash between Essendon and Collingwood he was promoted to the senior list again and was initially named as an emergency, but made his debut when Anthony Rocca was unable to play due to injury.

After 2008, Wellingham went on to entrench himself as a vital member of Collingwood's midfield. His pace, footskills, overhead marking and ferocity at the contest became valuable assets to the Magpies' side.

He played in the 2010 grand final-winning team.

He put himself in the spotlight with a career-best 37 possessions in the 2011 Queen's Birthday game against Melbourne, where he stood up in the absence of a number of star teammates to lead Collingwood to a dominant 88-point win.

On 6 July 2012, in a Friday night game against arch-rival Carlton, Wellingham laid a head-high bump on Carlton's Kade Simpson when Simpson was running back with the flight of the ball, attempting to take a mark. The Match Review Panel deemed the hit worthy of a five-match suspension, but due to Wellingham's five-year good record, the suspension was reduced to four weeks, and reduced a further 25% to three weeks due to an early guilty plea.

At the end of the 2012 season during the AFL Trade Period, Wellingham was traded to the West Coast Eagles, Collingwood in return receiving the Eagles' first round pick, #17. His first season at the Eagles was marred by an ankle injury sustained while using a trampoline during the pre-season, while his second season, 2014, was limited by injury and poor form.

Wellingham was delisted by West Coast at the end of the 2017 season.

== Statistics ==
Statistics are correct to the end of the 2017 season

Legend
| G | Goals | K | Kicks | D | Disposals | T | Tackles |
| B | Behinds | H | Handballs | M | Marks |

| Season | Team | No. | Games | Totals | | | | | | | Averages (per game) | | | | | | |
| Season | Team | No. | Games | G | B | K | H | D | M | T | G | B | K | H | D | M | T |
|---|---|---|---|---|---|---|---|---|---|---|---|---|---|---|---|---|---|
| 2008 | Collingwood | 21 | 12 | 4 | 4 | 80 | 84 | 164 | 41 | 35 | 0.3 | 0.3 | 6.7 | 7.0 | 13.7 | 3.4 | 2.9 |
| 2009 | Collingwood | 21 | 16 | 6 | 4 | 130 | 147 | 277 | 53 | 40 | 0.4 | 0.3 | 8.1 | 9.2 | 17.3 | 3.3 | 2.5 |
| 2010 | Collingwood | 21 | 24 | 15 | 18 | 265 | 203 | 468 | 93 | 95 | 0.6 | 0.8 | 11.0 | 8.5 | 19.5 | 3.9 | 4.0 |
| 2011 | Collingwood | 21 | 20 | 17 | 10 | 220 | 150 | 370 | 63 | 79 | 0.9 | 0.5 | 11.0 | 7.5 | 18.5 | 3.2 | 4.0 |
| 2012 | Collingwood | 21 | 20 | 13 | 13 | 233 | 151 | 384 | 88 | 87 | 0.7 | 0.7 | 11.7 | 7.6 | 19.2 | 4.4 | 4.4 |
| 2013 | West Coast | 12 | 10 | 8 | 3 | 111 | 80 | 191 | 32 | 27 | 0.8 | 0.3 | 11.1 | 8.0 | 19.1 | 3.2 | 2.7 |
| 2014 | West Coast | 12 | 13 | 5 | 3 | 124 | 103 | 227 | 41 | 38 | 0.4 | 0.2 | 9.5 | 7.9 | 17.5 | 3.2 | 2.9 |
| 2015 | West Coast | 12 | 24 | 4 | 0 | 261 | 187 | 448 | 115 | 42 | 0.1 | 0.0 | 10.8 | 7.7 | 18.6 | 4.7 | 1.7 |
| 2016 | West Coast | 12 | 19 | 1 | 2 | 192 | 125 | 317 | 69 | 41 | 0.1 | 0.1 | 10.1 | 6.5 | 16.6 | 3.6 | 2.1 |
| 2017 | West Coast | 12 | 13 | 0 | 3 | 134 | 91 | 225 | 60 | 25 | 0 | 0.2 | 10.3 | 7.0 | 17.3 | 4.6 | 1.9 |
| Career | | | 171 | 73 | 60 | 1750 | 1321 | 3071 | 654 | 509 | 0.4 | 0.3 | 10.2 | 7.7 | 17.9 | 3.8 | 2.9 |
