= Chris Donlon =

Australian rules football field umpire

Personal information
- Full name: Christopher Donlon
- Height: 177 cm (5 ft 10 in)

Umpiring career
Years	League	Role	Games
2005–2024	AFL	Field umpire	426

Career highlights
- 2011 AFL Grand Final

Christopher Donlon is a former Australian rules football field umpire who officiated in the Australian Football League. He umpired 426 career games in the AFL.

Donlon umpired in the 2011 AFL Grand Final.

During extra time of a 2017 final between the Port Adelaide and the West Coast Eagles, Donlon awarded a controversial free kick to West Coast player Luke Shuey for high contact. Shuey went on to kick the winning goal after the siren. The AFL later clarified they believed it was the correct decision.
