= Ben Johnson (Australian footballer) =

Australian rules footballer, born 1981

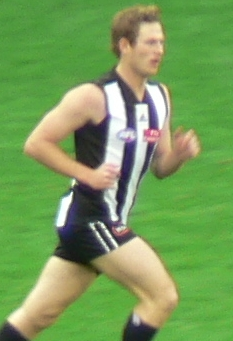
- Ben Johnson playing for Collingwood during the 2006 AFL Season

Personal information
- Full name: Ben Johnson
- Born: 5 April 1981 (age 45)
- Original team: Northern Knights (TAC Cup)
- Draft: 1. 62, 1999 National Draft, Collingwood
- Height: 183 cm (6 ft 0 in)
- Weight: 84 kg (185 lb)
- Position: Midfielder / Defender

Playing career^{1}
| Years | Club | Games (Goals) |
| 2000–2013 | Collingwood | 235 (70) |
- ^{1} Playing statistics correct to the end of 2013.

Career highlights
- Collingwood premiership player 2010; Jason McCartney Medal 2004; AFL Anzac Medal 2006; Bob Rose–Charlie Sutton Medal 2008

Ben Johnson (born 5 April 1981) is a former professional Australian rules football player who played for the Collingwood Football Club in the Australian Football League (AFL).

== Football career ==
Originally from the former St.Mary's, Johnson was snapped up late in the 1999 AFL draft, no.62 overall. He started his career with a bang, kicking 3 goals on debut for the Magpies, however, he settled as most first-year players and struggled to play-out in consistent fashion, being dropped mid-season. He established himself as a tough running half-back who could play a key tagging role on the last line of defence. He could find the ball and his kicking that looked ordinary, was efficient.

Johnson became a key player during the 2002 and 2003 Grand Final seasons. He finished top 6 in the best and fairest and was recognised as a top senior player wearing Gavin Brown's number 26. He had over 300 disposals in both the seasons, and played all 25 games in 2003 following 23 games in 2002.

In 2004 however, he had his best year. He was a regular best player in the side, and despite the Magpies loss in form, his increased. He once again played all possible games, and he averaged over 17 touches. He finished equal 2nd in the best and fairest behind winner James Clement by 5 votes, and also polled the most Brownlow Medal votes for the club, with 10. In 2005 he had an interrupted season, with injury concerns after a concussion mid-season, and also a rumoured dispute with coach Mick Malthouse. He only played 13 games, and ended a 77 consecutive games streak.

His 2006 season would be one of his best after a poor 2005, playing all 23 games, and providing great run out of the back line. His dash was recognised early during the year, as he would be at the top of the league in metres gained. Johnson would be awarded the ANZAC Day Medal for being best on ground in the match against Essendon, despite being called "Craig Johnson" by the announcer of the medallion. Johnson continued his form consistently through the season, giving him another second place in the Copeland Trophy and averaging more than 23 disposals. He also polled 11 Brownlow Medal votes.

In Round 20, 2007, Johnson received a six match suspension for making forceful front-on contact with Melbourne's Daniel Bell which ended his finals campaign.

His career was on the rocks in 2008 before rebounding to reach some of his best form in the latter stages of 2009 despite suffering a broken leg in the round three loss to Geelong.

Johnson enjoyed a strong 2010 season, culminating in becoming a member of Collingwood's 15th VFL/AFL Premiership. His finals series was particularly memorable, slotting the Magpies' seventh goal on the run, sidestepping Cameron Ling late in the first quarter of the 2010 Preliminary Final victory. He managed to nullify long-standing rival Stephen Milne in both the Grand Final and the Grand Final Replay. Johnson booted Collingwood's second goal of the Replay, and was the only remaining player from Mick Malthouse's first match as coach of Collingwood (round one, 2000, against Hawthorn).

Ben Johnson retired on 15 July 2013.

Following his retirement, at the beginning of 2014 Johnson presented Marley Williams with his number 26 guernsey, reenacting Gavin Brown's presentation of the guernsey to him in 2001.

== Personal life ==
In August 2006 Johnson was involved in a drunken brawl outside a hotel in Port Melbourne with then-teammate Chris Tarrant. Both players were fined $5,000 by Collingwood. Johnson was later charged with recklessly causing injury and unlawful assault and appeared before a Magistrate in 2007 but avoided conviction due to his heavy involvement in community service with the TAC.

== Statistics ==
Legend
| G | Goals | K | Kicks | D | Disposals | T | Tackles |
| B | Behinds | H | Handballs | M | Marks |

| Season | Team | No. | Games | Totals | | | | | | | Averages (per game) | | | | | | |
| Season | Team | No. | Games | G | B | K | H | D | M | T | G | B | K | H | D | M | T |
|---|---|---|---|---|---|---|---|---|---|---|---|---|---|---|---|---|---|
| 2000 | Collingwood | 31 | 14 | 7 | 10 | 100 | 60 | 160 | 45 | 11 | 0.5 | 0.7 | 7.1 | 4.3 | 11.4 | 3.2 | 0.8 |
| 2001 | Collingwood | 26 | 16 | 3 | 8 | 116 | 70 | 186 | 36 | 21 | 0.2 | 0.5 | 7.3 | 4.4 | 11.6 | 2.3 | 1.3 |
| 2002 | Collingwood | 26 | 23 | 1 | 7 | 197 | 118 | 315 | 73 | 42 | 0.0 | 0.3 | 8.6 | 5.1 | 13.7 | 3.2 | 1.8 |
| 2003 | Collingwood | 26 | 25 | 6 | 4 | 230 | 144 | 374 | 91 | 46 | 0.2 | 0.2 | 9.2 | 5.8 | 15.0 | 3.6 | 1.8 |
| 2004 | Collingwood | 26 | 22 | 4 | 7 | 258 | 121 | 379 | 93 | 30 | 0.2 | 0.3 | 11.7 | 5.5 | 17.2 | 4.2 | 1.4 |
| 2005 | Collingwood | 26 | 13 | 1 | 2 | 165 | 65 | 230 | 51 | 23 | 0.1 | 0.2 | 12.7 | 5.0 | 17.7 | 3.9 | 1.8 |
| 2006 | Collingwood | 26 | 23 | 10 | 9 | 374 | 157 | 531 | 141 | 64 | 0.4 | 0.4 | 16.3 | 6.8 | 23.1 | 6.1 | 2.8 |
| 2007 | Collingwood | 26 | 19 | 11 | 8 | 257 | 91 | 348 | 84 | 39 | 0.6 | 0.4 | 13.5 | 4.8 | 18.3 | 4.4 | 2.1 |
| 2008 | Collingwood | 26 | 16 | 7 | 4 | 187 | 91 | 278 | 83 | 31 | 0.4 | 0.3 | 11.7 | 5.7 | 17.4 | 5.2 | 1.9 |
| 2009 | Collingwood | 26 | 14 | 5 | 3 | 162 | 125 | 287 | 45 | 22 | 0.4 | 0.2 | 11.6 | 8.9 | 20.5 | 3.2 | 1.6 |
| 2010 | Collingwood | 26 | 23 | 7 | 6 | 320 | 167 | 487 | 98 | 51 | 0.3 | 0.3 | 13.9 | 7.3 | 21.2 | 4.3 | 2.2 |
| 2011 | Collingwood | 26 | 16 | 7 | 6 | 224 | 136 | 360 | 57 | 35 | 0.4 | 0.4 | 14.0 | 8.5 | 22.5 | 3.6 | 2.2 |
| 2012 | Collingwood | 26 | 8 | 1 | 1 | 103 | 45 | 148 | 27 | 14 | 0.1 | 0.1 | 12.9 | 5.6 | 18.5 | 3.4 | 1.8 |
| 2013 | Collingwood | 26 | 3 | 0 | 0 | 29 | 19 | 48 | 6 | 12 | 0.0 | 0.0 | 9.7 | 6.3 | 16.0 | 2.0 | 4.0 |
| Career | | | 235 | 70 | 75 | 2722 | 1409 | 4131 | 930 | 441 | 0.3 | 0.3 | 11.6 | 6.0 | 17.6 | 4.0 | 1.9 |
