= Brent Moloney =

Australian rules footballer, born 1984

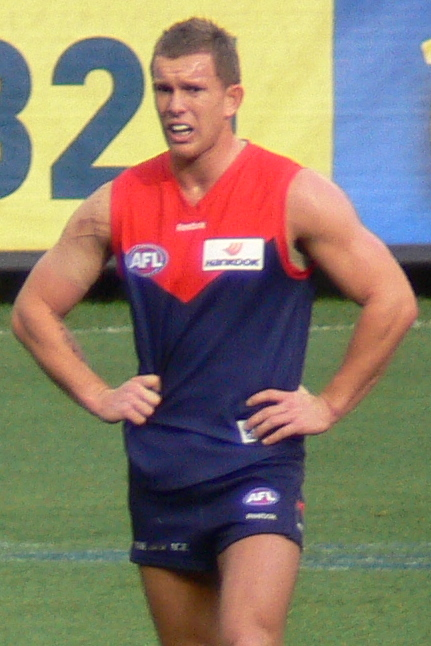
- Moloney with Melbourne in 2009

Personal information
- Full name: Brent Moloney
- Nickname: Beamer
- Born: 28 January 1984 (age 42)
- Original team: South Warrnambool / Geelong Falcons
- Height: 182 cm (6 ft 0 in)
- Weight: 88 kg (194 lb)

Playing career^{1}
Years	Club	Games (Goals)
2003–2004	Geelong	23 (6)
2005–2012	Melbourne	122 (31)
2013–2014	Brisbane Lions	21 (9)
Total		166 (46)
- ^{1} Playing statistics correct to the end of 2014.

Career highlights
- Keith 'Bluey' Truscott Medal 2011; 2004 AFL Rising Star nominee

Brent Moloney (born 28 January 1984) is a former Australian rules footballer who played for the Brisbane Lions, Melbourne Football Club and Geelong Football Club in the Australian Football League (AFL).

== Early life ==
Originating from Warrnambool, Victoria, Moloney supported the Demons as a child and his hero was Allen Jakovich, who played for Melbourne. Moloney played in the TAC Cup for the Geelong Falcons.

== AFL career ==
=== Geelong Football Club ===
He was drafted in the 2003 pre-season draft by Geelong, and made his debut with Geelong Football Club in round 14, 2003. In 2003 Moloney received an AFL Rising Star nomination.

=== Melbourne Football Club ===
Moloney was traded to the Melbourne Football Club following the 2004 AFL season, after which he would play 21 games for Melbourne in 2005.

Injury sidelined him for much of the next three seasons, seeing him play only playing 27 games. He injured his shoulder in Melbourne's Round 11 match against Collingwood in 2008, sidelining him for the rest of the season.

Following a successful recovery from shoulder surgery, he was able to train injury-free for the whole of the 2009 pre-season, and he went on to play every game for the season finding his form back with many consistent performances. His return to his consistent best in 2009 was highlighted by his career-best statistics in every category except kicks – he had the most number of disposals, handballs, goals and marks of any season in his career to that point.

In 2011 Brent received 19 Brownlow Medal votes, and his form saw him awarded Melbourne's best and fairest.

=== Brisbane Lions ===
In September 2012, Moloney became the AFL's first free agent, when he announced that he would leave the Melbourne Football Club. On 10 October 2012, he agreed to accept an offer from the Brisbane Lions.

On 11 August 2014, Moloney retired from football following an Achilles tendon injury.

=== Controversy ===
In April 2011, Moloney was evicted from a Melbourne nightclub for drunkenness the night after a match. As a consequence, he was stripped of the vice-captaincy.

Moloney was reinstated to the vice captaincy on 9 June, following good form, counselling for his drinking problem and a vote by the entire playing list.

Moloney was substituted out of the Round 19 game against his former club Geelong, which Melbourne lost by a near-record 186 points, after failing to register a statistic in the first half.

In June 2013, after Melbourne coach Mark Neeld was sacked, Moloney took to Instagram and posted a photo on his profile, saying "karma is a bitch". Moloney had been dropped sporadically during his final year at Melbourne, which was Neeld's first as head coach.

== Statistics ==
Brownlow Medal votes
Season	Votes
2003	0
2004	0
2005	3
2006	0
2007	0
2008	0
2009	5
2010	7
2011	19
2012	0
2013	2
2014	0
Total	36
Key:
Red / Italics = Ineligible

Legend
G	Goals	K	Kicks	D	Disposals	T	Tackles
B	Behinds	H	Handballs	M	Marks

Season	Team	No.	Games	Totals							Averages (per game)						
Season	Team	No.	Games	G	B	K	H	D	M	T	G	B	K	H	D	M	T
2003	Geelong	32	8	1	5	56	18	74	21	8	0.1	0.6	7.0	2.3	9.3	2.6	1.0
2004	Geelong	32	15	5	6	130	60	190	55	16	0.3	0.4	8.7	4.0	12.7	3.7	1.1
2005	Melbourne	22	21	2	8	267	95	362	72	56	0.1	0.4	12.7	4.5	17.2	3.4	2.7
2006	Melbourne	22	7	1	4	72	37	109	27	12	0.1	0.6	10.3	5.3	15.6	3.9	1.7
2007	Melbourne	22	10	5	3	92	74	166	24	26	0.5	0.3	9.2	7.4	16.6	2.4	2.6
2008	Melbourne	22	8	2	0	94	73	167	47	38	0.3	0.0	11.8	9.1	20.9	5.9	4.8
2009	Melbourne	22	21	7	3	229	283	512	98	78	0.3	0.1	10.9	13.5	24.4	4.7	3.7
2010	Melbourne	22	18	2	8	192	235	427	40	86	0.1	0.4	10.7	13.1	23.7	2.2	4.8
2011	Melbourne	22	22	9	4	282	227	509	41	124	0.4	0.2	12.8	10.3	23.1	1.9	5.6
2012	Melbourne	22	15	3	5	136	120	256	26	52	0.2	0.3	9.1	8.0	17.1	1.7	3.5
2013	Brisbane Lions	3	16	8	5	160	156	316	41	84	0.5	0.3	10.0	9.8	19.8	2.6	5.3
2014	Brisbane Lions	3	5	1	3	43	58	101	8	28	0.2	0.6	8.6	11.6	20.2	1.6	5.6
Career			166	46	54	1753	1436	3189	500	608	0.3	0.3	10.6	8.7	19.2	3.0	3.7

== Honours and achievements ==
Individual

- Keith 'Bluey' Truscott Trophy: 2011
- Australia international rules football team: 2005
- AFL Rising Star nominee: 2004 (Round 10)
