= Andrew Walker (footballer) =

Australian rules footballer, born 1986

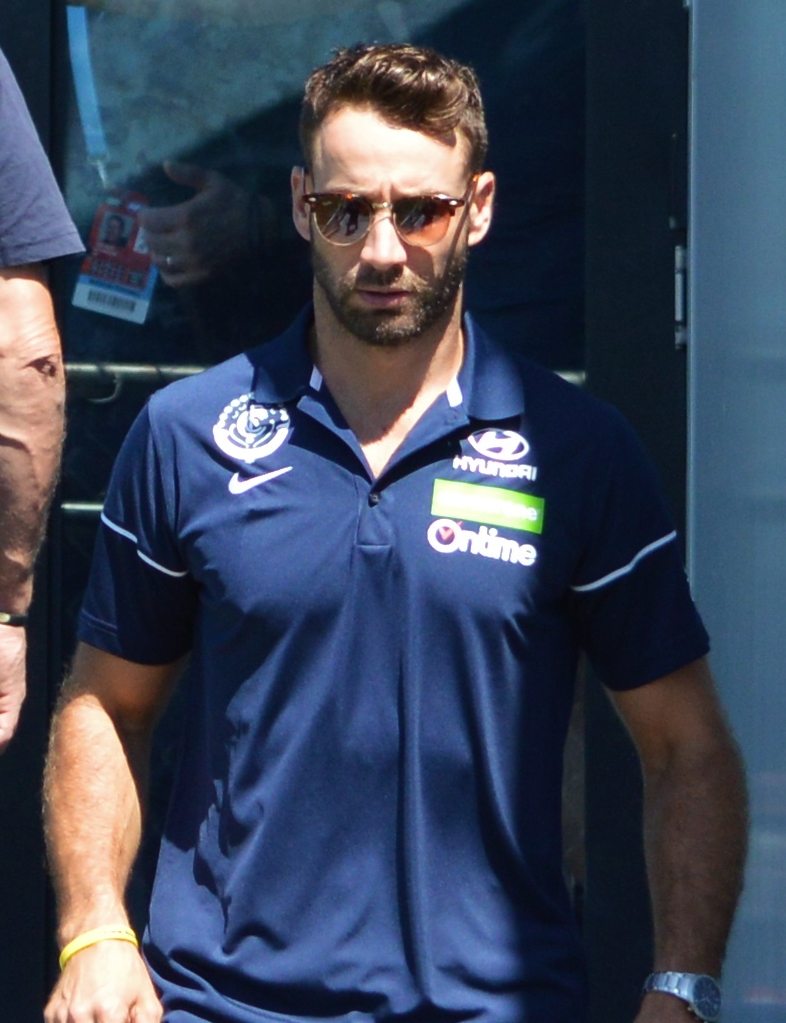
- Walker with Carlton in March 2017

Personal information
- Full name: Andrew Walker
- Born: 18 May 1986 (age 40); Echuca, Victoria
- Original team: Bendigo Pioneers (TAC Cup)/Echuca
- Draft: No. 2 (PP), 2003 National Draft, Carlton
- Height: 183 cm (6 ft 0 in)
- Weight: 88 kg (194 lb)
- Position: Forward, defender

Playing career^{1}
Years	Club	Games (Goals)
2004–2016	Carlton	202 (139)
- ^{1} Playing statistics correct to the end of 2016.

Career highlights
- Carlton leading goalkicker: 2011; Carlton life membership; 2004 AFL Rising Star nominee

Andrew Walker (born 18 May 1986) is a former professional Australian rules footballer who played with the Carlton Football Club in the Australian Football League (AFL).

== Early life ==
Andrew has Indigenous Australian heritage and his tribal ancestry can be traced to the Yorta Yorta.

He played his early career in country football and represented Bendigo in the TAC Cup before catching the eye of talent scouts.

He was educated at St Joseph's College Echuca and Caulfield Grammar School and graduated in 2004.

== AFL career ==
Walker was taken with Carlton's priority draft pick, the second pick overall, in the 2003 National Draft. Walker was Carlton's only high draft pick in either 2002 or 2003, as the club was stripped of its early selections in those drafts due to salary cap breaches. He was given Carlton champion Stephen Silvagni's guernsey, number 1, after its two-year retirement. Andrew was a bottom-aged player in the 2003 Draft, and studied Year 12 – Victorian Certificate of Education – during his debut year, at Caulfield Grammar School.

Walker made his debut in round 5, 2004, in Carlton's win over West Coast at Optus Oval, a performance that was considered one of the greatest debuts ever by a young player. In that game, he amassed 26 disposals, assisted three goals, and flew for what may well have been Mark of the Year had he held on to the ball. Walker earned a Rising Star Award nomination, and one Brownlow Medal vote, his career first, for that performance.

For the rest of 2004 and 2005, Andrew struggled to reproduce the stunning form he displayed on debut, and it wasn't until 2006 that he started to play consistent football for the Carlton senior side. In 2006, Andrew had a number of very successful games as a tagger (often tagging the opposition's premier midfielder), and also provided much run off half back. Andrew's good 2006 was acknowledged by the club with a top-10 placing in the club's best-and-fairest award.

In 2007, Walker continued to develop as a footballer, and moved into Carlton's midfield where he uses his pace and ball-carrying ability. In mid-2007, he signed a deal tying him to the club until 2009.

Walker's 2008 and 2009 seasons were severely limited by a shoulder injury. He initially injured the shoulder in 2008 pre-season training; he recuperated without surgery to play in Carlton's pre-season games, but injured it again in the Blues' final practice match, requiring a reconstruction which prevented him from playing until round 16. He injured it again at the start of 2009, requiring another operation and preventing him from playing until round 18. Walker managed only thirteen matches for the two seasons.

He was one of a number of Carlton players involved in off-field incidents following a 2009 Christmas party. According to various sources, one of the players was arguing with a woman before a fight broke out between the teammates that ended up involving hotel staff. A security guard also became involved before police arrived as the fight was brought under control. Walker was escorted off the Crown Melbourne premises. He was then fined and suspended from pre-season training for a month. They were sent to a boxing gym and underwent a strenuous training program.

After finally returning to regular game-time in 2010, Walker was struggling to hold his place in the team as a midfielder/utility on form. Carlton sought interest from other clubs during the 2010 trade week, but ultimately no trade was negotiated and he remained at Carlton.

In 2011, he re-established himself as a key member of Carlton's senior team, in a new position as a key forward. He played all 24 games for the season, and kicked 56 goals to be the club's leading goalkicker, and finished sixth in the best and fairest. Additionally, in round 18 against Essendon, Walker took a huge specky over Essendon player Jake Carlisle, which was considered by many football observers, including The Age's Rohan Connolly, and both match-day coaches, Brett Ratten and James Hird, to be one of the greatest marks of all-time – although ultimately it did not win the season's Mark of the Year award. He was awarded life membership of the Carlton Football Club in December 2011.

In June 2014, Walker suffered a knee injury which ruled him out for the remainder of the season and dogged him for the rest of his career. Despite this, in July 2016 he became the first Aboriginal footballer to play 200 games for Carlton, reaching the milestone in their round 15 loss to Collingwood. In the following months, he continued to struggle with injury, and in August announced his intention to retire after the round 20 match against St Kilda at the Melbourne Cricket Ground.

== Statistics ==
Legend
G	Goals	K	Kicks	D	Disposals	T	Tackles
B	Behinds	H	Handballs	M	Marks

Season	Team	No.	Games	Totals							Averages (per game)						
Season	Team	No.	Games	G	B	K	H	D	M	T	G	B	K	H	D	M	T
2004	Carlton	1	15	2	4	97	45	142	41	21	0.1	0.3	6.5	3.0	9.5	2.7	1.4
2005	Carlton	1	18	6	1	123	54	177	44	37	0.3	0.1	6.8	3.0	9.8	2.4	2.1
2006	Carlton	1	22	6	6	270	112	382	118	40	0.3	0.3	12.3	5.1	17.4	5.4	1.8
2007	Carlton	1	19	10	7	252	139	391	91	48	0.5	0.4	13.3	7.3	20.6	4.8	2.5
2008	Carlton	1	7	6	2	87	51	138	44	20	0.9	0.3	12.4	7.3	19.7	6.3	2.9
2009	Carlton	1	6	2	3	63	49	112	33	7	0.3	0.5	10.5	8.2	18.7	5.5	1.2
2010	Carlton	1	16	5	4	203	131	334	97	22	0.3	0.3	12.7	8.2	20.9	6.1	1.4
2011	Carlton	1	24	56	27	238	111	349	111	62	2.3	1.1	9.9	4.6	14.5	4.6	2.6
2012	Carlton	1	15	16	11	169	106	275	56	36	1.1	0.7	11.3	7.1	18.3	3.7	2.4
2013	Carlton	1	23	7	3	398	130	528	102	48	0.3	0.1	17.3	5.7	23.0	4.4	2.1
2014	Carlton	1	14	2	2	223	92	315	71	28	0.1	0.1	15.9	6.6	22.5	5.1	2.0
2015	Carlton	1	12	12	6	106	57	163	48	22	1.0	0.5	8.8	4.8	13.6	4.0	1.8
2016	Carlton	1	11	9	8	77	53	130	34	25	0.8	0.7	7.0	4.8	11.8	3.1	2.3
Career			202	139	84	2306	1130	3436	890	416	0.7	0.4	11.4	5.6	17.0	4.4	2.1

== Personal life ==
Following his retirement, Walker was engaged by Carlton as a "Development & Integration" coach, specialising in helping first year players in their transition to becoming professional footballers. He and his wife Kylie have three children, boys Cody Jay and Arli, and daughter Leti.

== See also ==
- List of Caulfield Grammar School people
