= Daniel Cross (footballer) =

Australian rules footballer, born 1983

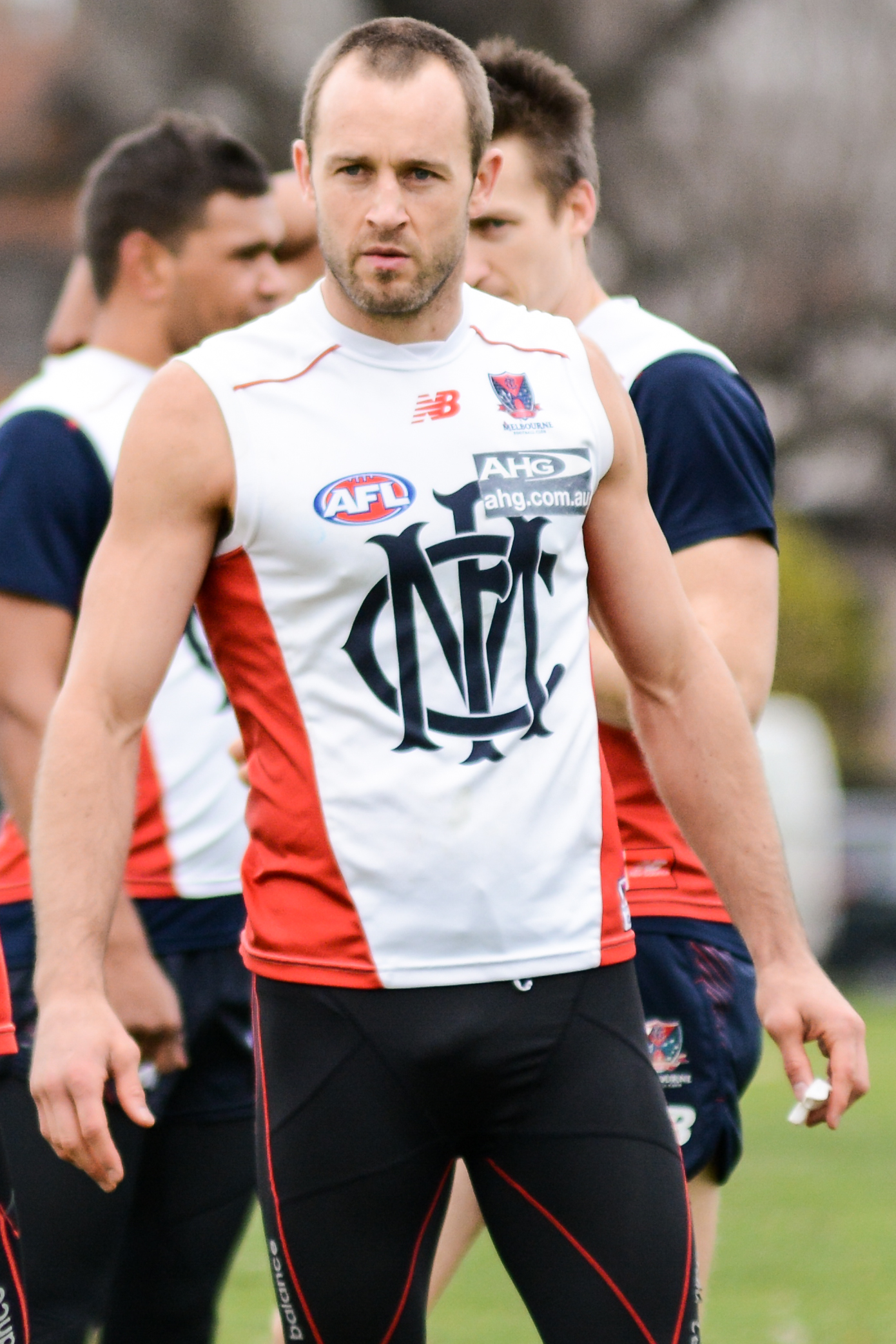
- Cross at training in July 2015

Personal information
- Full name: Daniel Cross
- Nickname: Crossy
- Born: 30 March 1983 (age 43)
- Original team: Murray Bushrangers (TAC Cup)
- Draft: No. 56, 2000 National Draft
- Debut: Round 10, 2002, Western Bulldogs vs. Richmond, at MCG
- Height: 187 cm (6 ft 2 in)
- Weight: 87 kg (192 lb)
- Position: Midfielder

Playing career^{1}
Years	Club	Games (Goals)
2002–2013	Western Bulldogs	210 (33)
2014–2015	Melbourne	39 (1)
Total		249 (34)

International team honours^{2}
Years	Team	Games (Goals)
2010	Australia	2
- ^{1} Playing statistics correct to the end of 2015.^{2} Representative statistics correct as of 2010.

Career highlights
- Charles Sutton Medallist: 2008; Pre-season premiership: 2010; AFL Rising Star nominee: 2004

Daniel Cross (born 30 March 1983) is a former professional Australian rules footballer who played for the Western Bulldogs and Melbourne Football Club in the Australian Football League (AFL). A Charles Sutton Medallist with the Western Bulldogs, he finished his 249-game career with 210 games at the Western Bulldogs and 39 with Melbourne. He has served as the development and rehabilitation coach of the Melbourne Football Club since October 2015.

== Early life and junior football ==
Cross was raised in Albury, New South Wales. He began playing at age 14 for St Patrick's Junior Football Club in Albury in the Under 16s. He played football at Albury High School and at age 16 he played in the thirds at the Albury Football Club before playing at St Patrick's. Seeking an AFL career he played with the Murray Bushrangers Under 18 team which led to AFL clubs taking an interest.

== AFL career ==
=== Early career (2002–2004) ===
Cross was recruited by the Western Bulldogs with the 56th overall selection in the 2000 national draft. He made his AFL debut in a 19-point victory against Richmond in round 10, 2002. Despite the Bulldogs winning the match, he managed only two disposals. He played a further three games for 2002. He played his first match for 2003 in round 4 against Essendon, but struggled to make a big impact. He was dropped after round 6 to the VFL to play with Werribee. After impressive performances with Werribee, Cross was recalled to the Bulldogs side. His return to the Bulldogs side was good enough for him to keep his place in the side the following week, but after a disappointing performance against Richmond in round 17, he was again dropped. He was promoted to the AFL side in round 22, and managed 18 disposals, in what was an otherwise disappointing game for the Bulldogs due to losing by 84 points to the Brisbane Lions. He made the decision to stay with the Western Bulldogs for the 2004 season, despite only managing to play a total of ten games in his first three seasons.

After playing just two games in the first ten weeks of the 2004 season, Cross was able to play the remaining twelve matches of the season and was named the round 19 nominee for the Rising Star after recording 28 disposals against Hawthorn at the Docklands Stadium.

=== Key midfielder at Western Bulldogs (2005–2010) ===
The Western Bulldogs made an impressive start to the 2005 campaign under new coach Rodney Eade. The Bulldogs opened the season with a 32-point victory over Collingwood, and he was vital in the win, collecting 24 possessions. He received his first ever Brownlow vote for his round 7 performance against Brisbane, where he recorded 29 possessions in the 23-point win. He finished the season with 563 disposals, and finished with the most handballs in the league with 384. Cross reached his 50-game milestone in round 4 2006, against Geelong where he collected 20 disposals in a 1-point victory over the Cats. He played his first finals match against Collingwood in the elimination final where he registered 32 disposals in a 41-point victory, however the Bulldogs lost the next week to West Coast. His season comprised many high-disposal matches and he finished the season third overall for disposals and second overall for handballs in the league. He suffered a serious injury against Brisbane Lions in round 11 2007 and missed the following six games. In his return match against Melbourne, he collected 30 disposals.

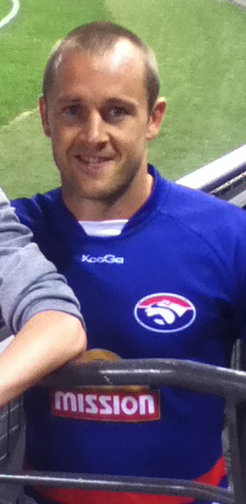
Cross Prior To Warm Up in 2013

2008 saw Cross play a more integral role in the midfield, with Scott West suffering a long term injury. He played his 100th AFL game in round 15 against Melbourne, where he registered 25 disposals in a 31-point victory. He was one of the three Bulldogs players nominated for the 2008 MVP award, eventually won by Gary Ablett. The Bulldogs made it to the preliminary final, in what was the best on-field season for the team to that point in Cross' career, they lost the preliminary final to eventual runners up, Geelong, by 29 points. His season was rewarded with the Charles Sutton Medal as the club best-and-fairest, finishing 24 points ahead of Brownlow Medallist, Adam Cooney. He also received the inaugural Scott West award for the most courageous player and the Bruce Wilkinson award for the best player as voted by the trainers.

In October 2008, he married long-time girlfriend Samantha Mallia.

Cross played every match of the 2009 season, where he accumulated a total of 581 disposals. The Western Bulldogs again made the preliminary final, but lost the match to St Kilda by 7 points. He underwent a double ankle reconstruction in the off-season of 2009, but managed to return during the 2010 NAB Cup, where the Bulldogs were the eventual winners. He played every match of the season which saw the Bulldogs reach a third consecutive preliminary final, but ultimately lost to St Kilda by 24-points. He was the runner up in the best-and-fairest, finishing nine votes behind Ryan Griffen. He also played in the 2010 International Rules Series against Ireland.

=== Final years at Western Bulldogs (2011–2013) ===
He continued his consistent performances in 2011 where he averaged over 24 possessions per game for the seventh season in a row. He received the Scott West award and was ranked first at the club for tackles (125, averaging 5.7), handballs (323, averaging 14.7) and marks (125, averaging 5.7). He was nominated for the most courageous player at the AFL Players Association awards, which was eventually won by Brisbane Lions captain, Jonathan Brown. During 2012, he shifted between the midfield and defence. He won the Scott West award for the second consecutive year.

Cross played the first eight games of 2013 before being dropped from the senior side, where he played for the Bulldogs aligned side, Williamstown, before earning a recall in round 19 against Sydney. In the week leading to the final round clash with Melbourne, it was announced the Bulldogs would not renew Cross' contract, ending his 11-year playing career with the club, in addition, it was the first time in a decade he did not finish inside the top-10 for the best-and-fairest.

=== Move to Melbourne (2014–2015) ===
In November 2013, Cross signed with Melbourne as a delisted free agent on a one-year contract. Brought into the club due to his 'reputation for elite preparation and leadership to help out the younger players', he was named in the leadership group alongside Lynden Dunn and Chris Dawes in April 2014, replacing the injured Jack Trengove and retired Mitch Clark. He played the first thirteen matches of 2014 before succumbing to a broken leg during the round 14 match against North Melbourne, he played the remainder of the match, but was forced to miss the next five matches through injury. He was offered a contract extension for 2015 in July due to his leadership experience. He returned to the side in round 20 against Hawthorn and played the remaining four matches for the season. He won the Dick Taylor trophy for finishing fifth in the best-and-fairest behind Nathan Jones, Dom Tyson, Bernie Vince and Lynden Dunn, he was also rewarded with the James McDonald award for best team man.

Cross was maintained in the leadership group for 2015 and played every match for the season, mainly across half-back. He recorded an equal career-high 39 disposals against Fremantle in round 22, however, three days later, it was announced Melbourne would not offer Cross a contract extension and he subsequently announced his retirement effective after the round 23 match against Greater Western Sydney. He was awarded the Ron Barassi Jnr leadership award for 2015 alongside Jack Trengove. In October, he accepted an off-field role to stay at Melbourne as development and rehabilitation coach from 2016 onward. He also acts as the team's runner on game day since 2016.

== Albury FC (2016 - 2021) ==
Cross returned to play with his original club, Albury in the Ovens & Murray Football League in 2016 in a part time roles as a player, when time permitted him with his work commitments at Melbourne FC. He represented the O&MFL in 2016 against the Hampden Football League and won the best on ground award - the Norm Minns Medal. He then followed this up with a 2016 O&MFL premiership, plus the best on ground award in the grand final - the Did Simpson Medal. Cross then played in Albury's losing 2017 grand final, then played in another O&MFL premiership in 2018.

== Victoria Harbour incident ==
On 4 October 2007, Cross and teammate Tom Williams leaped into the water of Victoria Harbour in Hong Kong to rescue a schoolgirl attempting to commit suicide. Despite the girl not wanting to be saved, they hauled her to safety after hearing bystanders screaming for help. When they emerged from the harbour they both had minor bruises and cuts. Both were reported to be in good spirits after the incident. Following the incident, Cross and Williams were awarded certificates of commendation by Hong Kong's director of marine.

== Statistics ==
Legend
G	Goals	K	Kicks	D	Disposals	T	Tackles
B	Behinds	H	Handballs	M	Marks

Season	Team	No.	Games	Totals							Averages (per game)						
Season	Team	No.	Games	G	B	K	H	D	M	T	G	B	K	H	D	M	T
2002	Western Bulldogs	38	4	1	0	5	7	12	4	3	0.3	0.0	1.3	1.8	3.0	1.0	0.8
2003	Western Bulldogs	38	6	0	1	19	36	55	19	9	0.0	0.2	3.2	6.0	9.2	3.2	1.5
2004	Western Bulldogs	38	14	1	0	55	131	186	43	39	0.1	0.0	3.9	9.4	13.3	3.1	2.8
2005	Western Bulldogs	4	22	2	5	179	384	563	127	94	0.1	0.2	8.1	17.5	25.6	5.8	4.3
2006	Western Bulldogs	4	24	9	6	262	363	625	146	108	0.4	0.3	10.9	15.1	26.0	6.1	4.5
2007	Western Bulldogs	4	15	1	2	126	241	367	89	59	0.1	0.1	8.4	16.1	24.5	5.9	3.9
2008	Western Bulldogs	4	25	5	2	241	422	663	138	117	0.2	0.1	9.6	16.9	26.5	5.5	4.7
2009	Western Bulldogs	4	23	5	2	162	419	581	128	100	0.2	0.1	7.0	18.2	25.3	5.6	4.3
2010	Western Bulldogs	4	25	2	4	238	423	661	139	136	0.1	0.2	9.5	16.9	26.4	5.6	5.4
2011	Western Bulldogs	4	22	1	2	207	323	530	125	125	0.0	0.1	9.4	14.7	24.1	5.7	5.7
2012	Western Bulldogs	4	17	2	1	163	242	405	88	69	0.1	0.1	9.6	14.2	23.8	5.2	4.1
2013	Western Bulldogs	4	13	4	2	117	177	294	71	57	0.3	0.2	9.0	13.6	22.6	5.5	4.4
2014	Melbourne	18	17	1	3	123	244	367	71	90	0.1	0.2	7.2	14.4	21.6	4.2	5.3
2015	Melbourne	18	22	0	1	216	275	491	116	76	0.0	0.0	9.8	12.5	22.3	5.3	3.5
Career			249	34	31	2113	3687	5800	1304	1082	0.1	0.1	8.5	14.8	23.3	5.2	4.4
