= 2004 AFL Rising Star =

Australian rules football award

2004 National AFL Rising Star
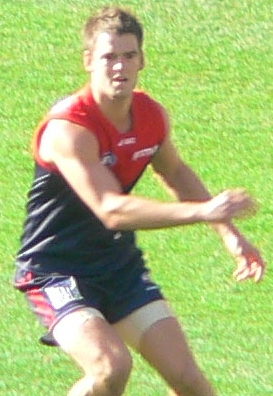
- Jared Rivers, winner of the 2004 AFL Rising Star award
- Sponsored by: National Australia Bank
- Country: Australia
- Rising Star: Jared Rivers (Melbourne)

The National AFL Rising Star award is given annually to a stand out young player in the Australian Football League. The 2004 medal was won by Melbourne player Jared Rivers.

== Eligibility ==
Every round, an Australian Football League rising star nomination is given to a stand out young player. To be eligible for the award, a player must be under 21 on 1 January of that year, have played 10 or fewer senior games and not been suspended during the season. At the end of the year, one of the 22 nominees is the winner of award.

== Nominations ==
Round	Player	Club	Ref.
1	Aaron Davey	Melbourne	
2	Michael Firrito	Kangaroos	
3	Jared Rivers	Melbourne	
4	Paul Bevan	Sydney	
5	Andrew Walker	Carlton	
6	Kane Tenace	Geelong	
7	Brent Staker	West Coast	
8	Andrew Mackie	Geelong	
9	Guy Richards	Collingwood	
10	Brent Moloney	Geelong	
11	Brett Ebert	Port Adelaide	
12	Richard Hadley	Brisbane Lions	
13	Karl Norman	Carlton	
14	Jay Schulz	Richmond	
15	Mark Seaby	West Coast	
16	Brent Reilly	Adelaide	
17	Sam Butler	West Coast	
18	Beau Waters	West Coast	
19	Daniel Cross	Western Bulldogs	
20	Brent Stanton	Essendon	
21	Adam Cooney	Western Bulldogs	
22	Brent Hartigan	Richmond	

== Final voting ==
	Player	Club	Votes
1	Jared Rivers	Melbourne	45
2	Aaron Davey	Melbourne	26
3	Richard Hadley	Brisbane Lions	20
4	Paul Bevan	Sydney	17
4	Adam Cooney	Western Bulldogs	17
6	Brent Reilly	Adelaide	4
7	Karl Norman	Carlton	3
7	Andrew Walker	Carlton	3
Source: AFL Record Season Guide 2015
