= Michael Firrito =

Australian rules footballer

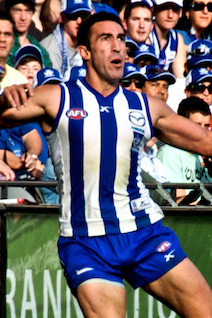
- Firrito playing for North Melbourne in 2011

Personal information
- Full name: Michael Firrito
- Nickname: Spud
- Born: 27 November 1983 (age 42)
- Original team: Box Hill Hawks (VFL)
- Draft: No. 10, 2003 rookie draft
- Height: 189 cm (6 ft 2 in)
- Weight: 93 kg (205 lb)
- Position: Defender

Club information
- Current club: North Melbourne
- Number: 11

Playing career^{1}
Years	Club	Games (Goals)
2003–2016	North Melbourne	275 (29)

International team honours^{2}
Years	Team	Games (Goals)
2008	Australia	2
- ^{1} Playing statistics correct to the end of Round 23, 2016.^{2} Representative statistics correct as of 2008.

Career highlights
- AFL Rising Star nominee: 2004; Fothergill–Round–Mitchell Medal: 2002

Michael "Spud" Firrito (born 27 November 1983) is a former professional Australian rules footballer who played for the North Melbourne Football Club in the Australian Football League (AFL). He made his AFL debut in round 12, 2003. Although he was primarily a defender, he had been used as a tagger occasionally.

In August 2016, North Melbourne announced they would not renew Firrito's contract for the 2017 season.

== International Rules Series ==
Michael Firrito was selected by Mick Malthouse for 2008 International Rules series for Australia against Ireland. In the first Test, Firrito played as full back and right corner back before replacing Nathan Bock as goalkeeper for the second test, when he made many good saves despite conceding 4 goals. Firrito was one of 5 North Melbourne players selected in the squad, along with Daniel Wells, Drew Petrie, Brent Harvey and Matt Campbell.

== Statistics ==
Legend
G	Goals	K	Kicks	D	Disposals	T	Tackles
B	Behinds	H	Handballs	M	Marks

Season	Team	No.	Games	Totals							Averages (per game)						
Season	Team	No.	Games	G	B	K	H	D	M	T	G	B	K	H	D	M	T
2003	Kangaroos	42	2	0	0	6	2	8	1	3	0.0	0.0	3.0	1.0	4.0	0.5	1.5
2004	Kangaroos	24	16	4	2	90	61	151	35	33	0.3	0.1	5.6	3.8	9.4	2.2	2.1
2005	Kangaroos	24	23	5	4	168	105	273	84	74	0.2	0.2	7.3	4.6	11.9	3.7	3.2
2006	Kangaroos	24	17	3	5	130	107	237	76	44	0.2	0.3	7.6	6.3	13.9	4.5	2.6
2007	Kangaroos	24	24	1	1	164	168	332	89	39	0.0	0.0	6.8	7.0	13.8	3.7	1.6
2008	North Melbourne	11	23	1	7	156	179	335	109	40	0.0	0.3	6.8	7.8	14.6	4.7	1.7
2009	North Melbourne	11	22	9	6	172	197	369	81	101	0.4	0.3	7.8	9.0	16.8	3.7	4.6
2010	North Melbourne	11	22	2	2	192	232	424	89	54	0.1	0.1	8.7	10.5	19.3	4.0	2.5
2011	North Melbourne	11	21	2	1	180	163	343	68	57	0.1	0.0	8.6	7.8	16.3	3.2	2.7
2012	North Melbourne	11	23	1	1	190	222	412	98	37	0.0	0.0	8.3	9.7	17.9	4.3	1.6
2013	North Melbourne	11	17	0	0	162	90	252	83	28	0.0	0.0	9.5	5.3	14.8	4.9	1.6
2014	North Melbourne	11	20	1	0	192	135	327	94	34	0.1	0.0	9.6	6.8	16.4	4.7	1.7
2015	North Melbourne	11	23	0	3	189	123	312	79	52	0.0	0.1	8.2	5.3	13.6	3.4	2.3
2016	North Melbourne	11	22	0	0	165	117	282	83	26	0.0	0.0	7.5	5.3	12.8	3.8	1.2
Career			275	29	32	2156	1901	4057	1069	622	0.1	0.1	7.8	6.9	14.8	3.9	2.3
