= 2005 International Rules Series =

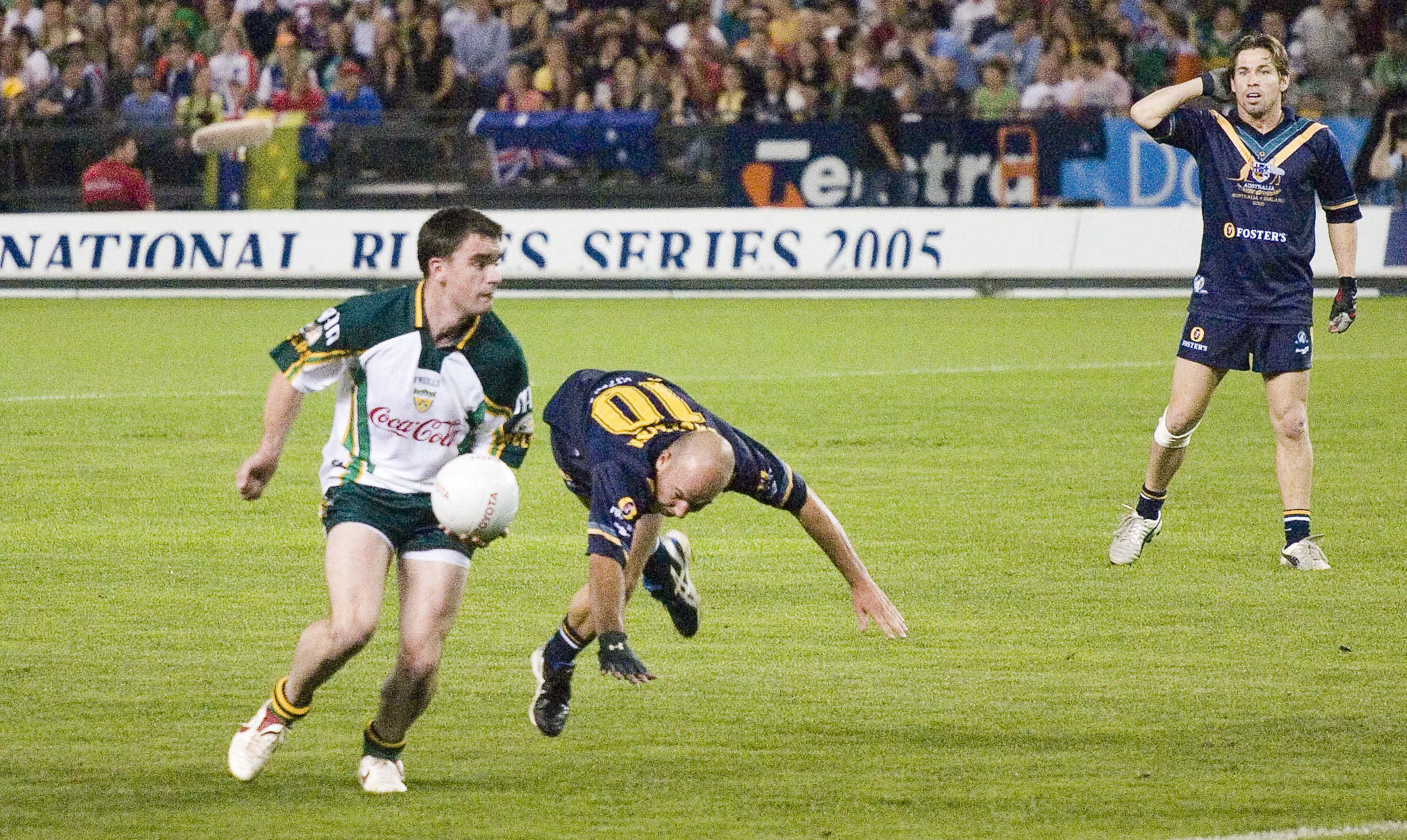
- Action from the second test in Melbourne
- Event: International Rules Series
Australia	Ireland
163	106
- 163–106 on aggregate, Australia win series 2–0

First test
Australia	Ireland
100	64
- Date: 21 October 2005
- Venue: Subiaco Oval, Perth
- Referee: Matthew James (Australia); David Coldrick (Ireland)
- Attendance: 39,098 (Sell Out)

Second test
Ireland	Australia
42	63
- Date: 28 October 2005
- Venue: Docklands Stadium, Melbourne
- Referee: Matthew James (Australia); Michael Collins (Ireland)
- Attendance: 45,428

The 2005 International Rules Series was the 12th annual International Rules Series and the 14th time that a test series of international rules football was played between Ireland and Australia and was won by Australia.

The 2005 series involved two test matches in Australia, the first in Perth (which was a sell-out) and a second test in Melbourne which was controversial due to the on field actions of the Australian team.

== Previous series ==
Starting with the first official senior-level International Rules Series was played between players from the Australian rules football leagues and the Gaelic Athletic Association in 1984, the Irish had won 7 of the previous series to Australia's 6. Coming into the series, the Irish held the Cormac McAnallen Cup after their 2004 whitewash of the Australians at Croke Park in Dublin.

== 2005 series ==
The Melbourne test was played at the Telstra Dome rather than the Melbourne Cricket Ground, unlike previous series in Australia, since the MCG was preparing to host the 2006 Commonwealth Games. By 1 August 2005, a vast majority of the tickets for the Perth test had been sold. When the matches were last played in Australia in 2003, over 100,000 people attended the two tests in Perth and Melbourne, underscoring the popularity of the series with Australian football fans.

The Ireland team was managed by former County Down manager Pete McGrath, an All Ireland winning manager, while the AFL appointed long-serving Essendon coach Kevin Sheedy as its new head coach, to replace Garry Lyon, who had been in charge of the Australians from 2001 to 2004.

The Irish suffered a blow to their attempt to retain the cup when Sydney Swans backfielder and team mainstay Tadhg Kennelly (originally from County Kerry) was unable for selection due to a nagging ankle injury that he was playing through during the Swans' run to the AFL premiership. In a departure from previous years, the Australians selected a team specifically for these games, rather than giving automatic selection to members of the All Australian Team. Another Irishman who has played in the AFL, Jim Stynes, assisted with selection and planning, giving insight into the Irish game as he has in previous years.

The series was comprehensively won by the Australians. In the first test, they outplayed the Irish in all aspects of the game, including speed and kicking the round ball, which are traditionally strengths of the Irish players. Kicking 2 goals and 27 overs, Australia became the first team to score 100 points in an international rules test. Australian umpire Mathew James attracted some criticism from the Irish press for applying the 20 metre penalty rule more strictly than expected by the Irish.

The Irish team was more competitive in the second test, in which there were several brawls and Australian captain Chris Johnson was sent off. However, they still lost by 21 points, meaning that Australia won the series on aggregate by 57 points.

== Fixtures ==
- First test: 21 October 2005 at Subiaco Oval, Perth, WA
- Second test: 28 October 2005 at Telstra Dome, Melbourne, VIC

== Squads ==
Australia			Ireland		
Name	Team	Position	Name	Team	Position
Heath Black	Fremantle		Seán Cavanagh	Tyrone	
Amon Buchanan	Sydney Swans		Brian Dooher	Tyrone	
Trent Croad	Hawthorn		Phillip Jordan	Tyrone	
Aaron Davey	Melbourne		Brian McGuigan	Tyrone	
Nick Davis	Sydney Swans		Ryan McMenamin	Tyrone	
Brett Deledio	Richmond		Owen Mulligan	Tyrone	
Nathan Eagleton	Western Bulldogs		Stephen O'Neill	Tyrone	
Dustin Fletcher	Essendon		Eoin Brosnan	Kerry	
Daniel Giansiracusa	Western Bulldogs		Colm Cooper	Kerry	
Lindsay Gilbee	Western Bulldogs		Tomás Ó Sé	Kerry	
Shannon Grant	Kangaroos		Graham Canty	Cork	
Brent Harvey	Kangaroos		Anthony Lynch	Cork	
Luke Hodge	Hawthorn		Seán Óg Ó hAilpín	Cork	
Chris Johnson (C)^{1}	Brisbane Lions		Michael McVeigh	Down	
Matthew Lappin	Carlton		Brendan Coulter	Down	
Andrew Lovett	Essendon		David Heaney	Mayo	
Andrew McLeod (C)^{1}	Adelaide		Ciarán McDonald	Mayo	
Troy Makepeace	Kangaroos		Pádraic Joyce (C)	Galway	
Darren Milburn	Geelong		Michael Meehan	Galway	
Brent Moloney	Melbourne		Tom Kelly	Laois	
Dale Morris	Western Bulldogs		Ross Munnelly	Laois	
Chris Newman	Richmond		Rónán Clarke	Armagh	
Ryan O'Keefe	Sydney Swans		Bryan Cullen	Dublin	
Russell Robertson	Melbourne		Dessie Dolan	Westmeath	
Jarrad Waite	Carlton		Mattie Forde	Wexford	
Daniel Wells³	Kangaroos		Ciaran McManus	Offaly	
Kepler Bradley²	Essendon		Seán Marty Lockhart	Derry	

^{1} – Australia named McLeod and Johnson as co-captains for the side.
² – Withdrawal replacement for Essendon's Matthew Lloyd.
³ – Officially ruled out for the first Test.

== Matches ==
=== First test (21 October) ===
Team	1	2	3	4	Total
Australia	0.8.1	1.12.4	2.19.7	2.27.7	(100)
Ireland	0.4.3	0.7.8	1.7.9	3.11.13	(64)
Australia won by 36	G.O.P	G.O.P	G.O.P	G.O.P	Final

Date	Friday, 21 October 2005
Scoring (AUS)	Goals: Lovett, Johnson Overs: Grant 3, Davis 3, Hodge 3, Lovett 3, O'Keefe 2, Gilbee 2, Giansiracusa 2, Davey 2, Johnson, Eagleton, Lappin, Croad, Harvey, Buchanan, Newman
Scoring (IRL)	Goals: Coulter 2, Cavanagh Overs: O'Neill 3, Clarke 3, Cavanagh 2, Coulter, Forde, McDonald
Best	AUS: Harvey, McLeod, Hodge, Giansiracusa, Davis, Lovett, Newman, Davey, Gilbee; IRL: Coulter, Cavanagh, O'Neill
Injuries	Nil
Venue	Subiaco Oval, Perth, WA
Attendance	39,098
Umpires	Mathew James (Australia), David Coldrick (Ireland)

=== Second test (28 October) ===
Team	1	2	3	4	Total
Australia	0.3.2	0.9.4	0.11.7	0.18.9	(63)
Ireland	0.4.1	0.5.3	0.8.8	0.11.9	(42)
Australia won by 21	G.O.P	G.O.P	G.O.P	G.O.P	Final

Date	Friday, 28 October 2005
Scoring (AUS)	Goals: Nil Overs: O'Keefe 4, Lappin 3, Lovett 2, Davis 2, Grant 2, Buchanan, Davey, Lovett, Giansiracusa, Makepeace
Scoring (IRL)	Goals: Nil Overs: Munnelly 2, Cavanagh 2, Clarke 2, Dolan, Joyce, McManus, McDonald
Best	AUS: Lappin, McLeod, Fletcher, Lovett, Gilbee, Giansiracusa, O'Keefe, Eagleton IRL: Kelly, McVeigh, Munnelly, Cavanagh, Canty
Injuries	Nil
Venue	Telstra Dome, Melbourne, VIC
Attendance	45,428
Umpires	Mathew James (Australia), Michael Collins (Ireland)

== See also ==
- International Rules football
- Gaelic football
- Australian rules football
- Comparison of Australian rules football and Gaelic football
