= Michael McVeigh =

Irish Gaelic footballer

Personal information
- Native name: Mícheál Mac an Bheatha (Irish)
- Height: 6 ft 3 in (191 cm)

Sport
- Sport: Gaelic Football
- Position: Goalkeeper
Club
- Years: Club
- 1980–2008: Castlewellan
Club titles
- Down titles: 2
Inter-county
- Years: County
- 1995–2007: Down

Michael McVeigh (born 10 December 1970) is a former Gaelic footballer who played as a goalkeeper for Down between 1995 and 2007.

Although McVeigh failed to win any major honours with Down, he did win three Railway Cups with Ulster and represented Ireland in the International Rules series.

== Honours ==
Although he failed to win major hours with Down, McVeigh was successful for Ulster and Ireland.

- Dr McKenna Cup (2): 1996, 1998
- Railway Cup (3): 2000, 2003, 2004
- International Rules Series (1): 2005
- Down Senior Football Championship (2): 1994, 1995

McVeigh won Irish News All-Stars in 2001 and 2003.
