= 2008 Brownlow Medal =

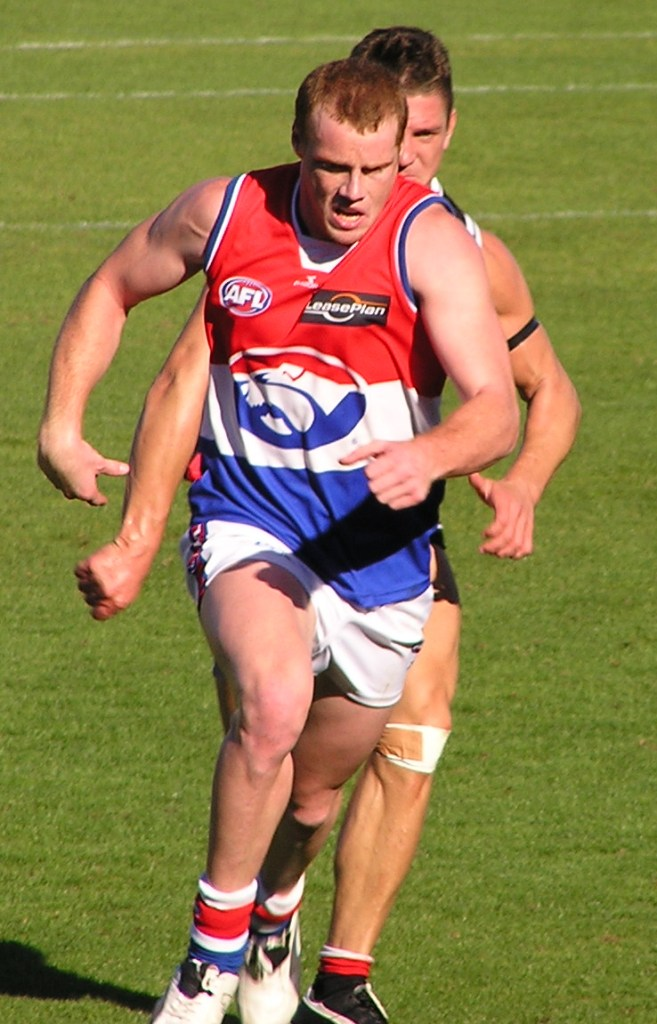
- 2008 Brownlow Medallist, Adam Cooney
- Date: 22 September
- Location: Crown Palladium
- Hosted by: Stephen Quartermain
- Winner: Adam Cooney (Western Bulldogs); 24 votes

Television/radio coverage
- Network: Network Ten

The 2008 Brownlow Medal was the 81st year the award was presented to the player adjudged the fairest and best player during the Australian Football League (AFL) home and away season. Adam Cooney of the Western Bulldogs won the medal by polling twenty-four votes during the 2008 AFL season. Pre-vote favourite, Gary Ablett and sentimental favourite, Matthew Richardson finished equal third on twenty-two votes. Cooney polled twenty-four votes, one ahead of Brisbane's Simon Black, who won the award in 2002 and was equal second in 2007.

== Leading vote-getters ==
	Player	Votes
1st	Adam Cooney (Western Bulldogs)	24
2nd	Simon Black (Brisbane)	23
=3rd	Gary Ablett (Geelong)	22
=3rd	Matthew Richardson (Richmond)	22
	Adam Goodes (Sydney)*	21
	Lance Franklin (Hawthorn)*	20
5th	Joel Selwood (Geelong)	19
=6th	Brent Harvey (North Melbourne)	17
=6th	Matthew Pavlich (Fremantle)	17
=8th	Chris Judd (Carlton)	16
=8th	Brad Sewell (Hawthorn)	16
=10th	Joel Corey (Geelong)	15
=10th	Lenny Hayes (St Kilda)	15
=10th	Scott Thompson (Adelaide)	15
	Sam Mitchell (Hawthorn)*	15

* The player was ineligible to win the medal due to suspension by the AFL Tribunal during the year.

== Voting procedure ==
The three field umpires (those umpires who control the flow of the game, as opposed to goal or boundary umpires) confer after each match and award three votes, two votes, and one vote to the players they regard as the best, second-best and third-best in the match, respectively. The votes are kept secret until the awards night, and they are read and tallied on the evening.

=== Ineligible players ===
As the medal is awarded to the fairest and best player in the league, those who have been suspended during the season by the AFL Tribunal (or, who avoided suspension only because of a discount for a good record or an early guilty plea) are ineligible to win the award; however, they may still continue to poll votes. In 2008 many of the leading contenders including Coleman Medallist Lance Franklin, Sam Mitchell, Adam Goodes, Brett Burton and Daniel Kerr all were found guilty of an offence and were ineligible to win the medal.

=== Pre-count betting ===
Despite changing clubs after the 2007 season, Chris Judd was installed as the early favourite when betting opened, but as the season progressed Gary Ablett became a short-priced favourite. When Ablett injured his ankle and missed three matches, Brent Harvey moved to outright favourite. By the end of the season however, Ablett had returned to favouritism, with 2007 winner Jimmy Bartel, Harvey and Adam Cooney close behind.
