= Adam Cooney =

Australian rules footballer, born 1985

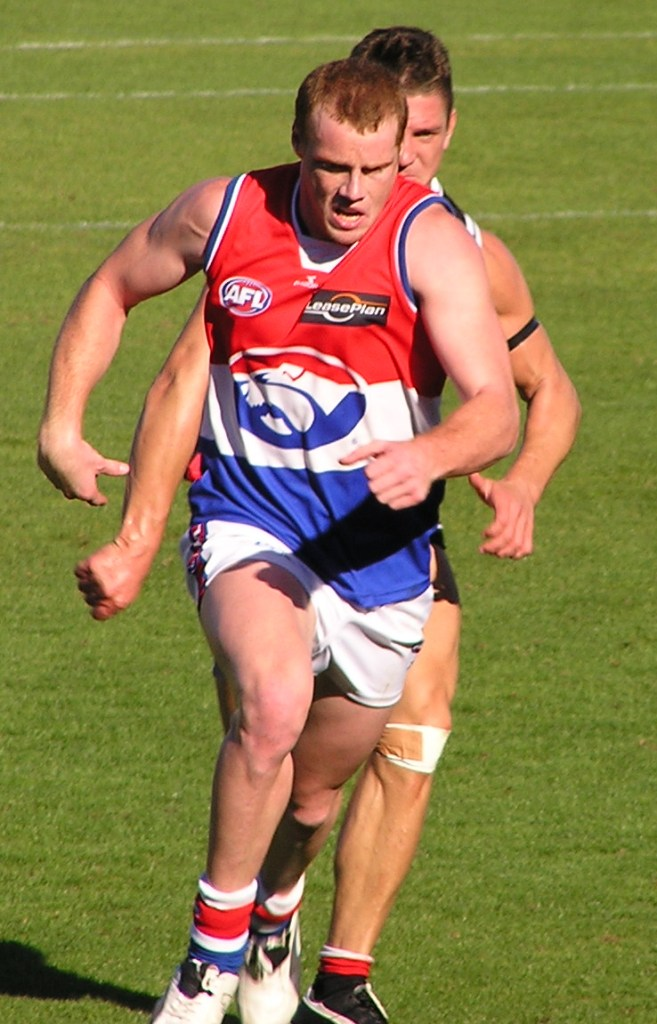

Personal information
- Full name: Adam Cooney
- Born: 30 September 1985 (age 41); Adelaide, South Australia
- Original team: West Adelaide (SANFL)
- Draft: No. 1 (PP), 2003 National Draft
- Height: 187 cm (6 ft 2 in)
- Weight: 83 kg (183 lb)
- Position: Forward / Midfielder

Playing career^{1}
Years	Club	Games (Goals)
2004–2014	Western Bulldogs	219 (186)
2015–2016	Essendon	31 (16)
Total		250 (202)

Representative team honours^{2}
Years	Team	Games (Goals)
2008	Dream Team	1 (0)
- ^{1} Playing statistics correct to the end of 2016.^{2} Representative statistics correct as of 2008.

Career highlights
- Brownlow Medal 2008; All-Australian Team 2008; 2004 AFL Rising Star nominee

Adam Cooney (born 30 September 1985) is a former professional Australian rules footballer who played for the Western Bulldogs and Essendon Football Club in the Australian Football League (AFL). He won the Brownlow Medal in 2008, with 24 votes becoming the tenth Western Bulldogs player to win the award.

== Early life ==
Cooney attended Flagstaff Hill R-7 Schools, Blackwood High School and later Aberfoyle Park High School and played for the Flagstaff Hill Football Club.

== AFL career ==
Cooney was recruited from West Adelaide in the SANFL to the Western Bulldogs with the number-one pick in the 2003 National Draft as a priority pick. Cooney was noted as a pacey player who could kick goals on the run from outside the 50-metre arc as well as snap kicks near the goal posts. Cooney debuted in Round 1 2004 against the West Coast Eagles, where he recorded 8 disposals and kicked a goal, and his first season saw him play 19 games and kick 11 goals for the season. He had a vastly improved 2005 season: he played every game, averaged 20 possessions a game and kicked 21 goals. He was ranked second for clearances in the Bulldogs team.

Cooney progressed to the elite of the competition, four seasons after being selected as the number one draft pick. His threat as a goalkicking midfielder grew: in 2006 and 2007, he kicked 30 and 28 goals, respectively, and he then pushed into the upper bracket of ball-winners by collecting 458 and 469 total disposals over the 2006 and 2007 season while maintaining his average of more than a goal per game and also directly assisting in many scores.

Cooney was rewarded for a strong 2008 season by winning the Brownlow Medal. He polled 24 votes, beating Brisbane Lions midfielder Simon Black by one vote. Cooney was the first No. 1 draft pick (and the first player taken as a priority draft pick) to win the award. His 2008 season saw him amass 637 total disposals and boot 23 goals, highlighted by a 25 disposal, 5 goal outing against the Sydney Swans in Round 7. He played 25 total games in 2008 and averaged 25.5 disposals per game.

In 2009, Cooney had another great season, playing 23 games, kicking 14 goals and averaging 26.8 disposals, although he only managed to poll 3 Brownlow Medal Votes. He also featured in the official advertisement for the AFL, brushing off several tacklers, including a bull in a bullfighting ring.

From the 2010–2012 season, Cooney struggled with injury and form, his impact on game, particularly his goal kicking was very minimal, as he only provided 27 majors over 3 seasons, and playing a total of 47 games in that span.

Cooney then bounced back in 2013, playing 19 games, kicking 19 goals and tallying 485 disposals for the season.

The 2014 season was Cooney's final year at the Bulldogs, he kicked 13 goals and played 18 games. His last game for the Dog's saw him tally 20 disposals and 2 tackles, a game in which the Dog's lost to the GWS Giants.

In October 2014, Cooney was traded to Essendon.

The 2015 season was Cooney's first in the red and black, he only managed 11 games and kicked 10 goals, including 3 on debut against the Sydney Swans in Round 1.

The Essendon Supplements Saga ordeal allowed Adam more of an opportunity to play regular senior football during the 2016 season. He managed to play 20 games and kick 6 goals, he also tallied 457 disposals. In August 2016, Cooney announced he would retire after the round 22 match against Western Bulldogs at Etihad Stadium. His final AFL game was also his 250th game and was fittingly against his old side, the Bulldogs, he gathered 22 disposals and kicked a goal.

== Other ventures ==
From 2 April 2023, Cooney appeared as a contestant in the ninth season of I'm a Celebrity...Get Me Out of Here!. Cooney was eliminated ninth on 27 April 2023.

In August 2025, he competed in the E. J. Whitten Legends Game.

== Personal life ==
Cooney proposed to his partner Haylea McCann with a Burger Ring. On 24 October 2009, he and McCann married in a ceremony at Glenelg Beach, Adelaide.

== Statistics ==
Legend
G	Goals	K	Kicks	D	Disposals	T	Tackles
B	Behinds	H	Handballs	M	Marks

Season	Team	No.	Games	Totals							Averages (per game)							Votes
Season	Team	No.	Games	G	B	K	H	D	M	T	G	B	K	H	D	M	T	Votes
2004	Western Bulldogs	17	19	11	12	119	105	224	44	30	0.6	0.6	6.3	5.5	11.8	2.3	1.6	3
2005	Western Bulldogs	17	22	21	13	236	198	434	93	56	1.0	0.6	10.7	9.0	19.7	4.2	2.5	12
2006	Western Bulldogs	17	24	30	19	242	216	458	128	60	1.3	0.8	10.1	9.0	19.1	5.3	2.5	4
2007	Western Bulldogs	17	22	28	21	262	207	469	112	79	1.3	1.0	11.9	9.4	21.3	5.1	3.6	9
2008	Western Bulldogs	17	25	23	6	311	326	637	98	65	0.9	0.2	12.4	13.0	25.5	3.9	2.6	24
2009	Western Bulldogs	17	23	14	15	277	340	617	81	58	0.6	0.7	12.0	14.8	26.8	3.5	2.5	3
2010	Western Bulldogs	17	20	9	12	263	252	515	79	60	0.5	0.6	13.2	12.6	25.8	4.0	3.0	8
2011	Western Bulldogs	17	13	9	8	156	129	285	38	40	0.7	0.6	12.0	9.9	21.9	2.9	3.1	2
2012	Western Bulldogs	17	14	9	6	162	131	293	38	37	0.6	0.4	11.6	9.4	20.9	2.7	2.6	3
2013	Western Bulldogs	17	19	19	11	264	221	485	82	44	1.0	0.6	13.9	11.6	25.5	4.3	2.3	7
2014	Western Bulldogs	17	18	13	6	190	164	354	67	59	0.7	0.3	10.6	9.1	19.7	3.7	3.3	7
2015	Essendon	13	11	10	4	123	64	187	33	25	0.9	0.4	11.2	5.8	17.0	3.0	2.3	0
2016	Essendon	17	20	6	14	259	198	457	116	57	0.3	0.7	13.0	9.9	22.8	5.8	2.8	4
Career			250	202	147	2864	2551	5415	1009	670	0.8	0.6	11.5	10.2	21.7	4.0	2.7	86

== Honours and achievements ==
- Team
  - NAB Cup (Western Bulldogs): 2010
- Individual
  - Brownlow Medal: 2008
  - All-Australian Team: 2008
  - Dream Team Representative Honours in AFL Hall of Fame Tribute Match: 2008
  - AFL Rising Star Nominee: 2004 (Round 21)
  - Number 1 AFL Draft Pick: 2003
