= 2008 AFL season =

112th season of the Australian Football League (AFL)

2008 AFL premiership season
- Teams: 16
- Premiers: Hawthorn; 10th premiership
- Minor premiers: Geelong; 13th minor premiership
- Pre-season cup: St Kilda; 3rd pre-season cup win
- Brownlow Medallist: Adam Cooney; Western Bulldogs (24 votes)
- Coleman Medallist: Lance Franklin; Hawthorn (102 goals)

Attendance
- Matches played: 185
- Total attendance: 7,082,949 (38,286 per match)
- Highest: 100,012 (Grand Final, Geelong vs. Hawthorn)

The 2008 AFL season was the 112th season of the Australian Football League (AFL), the highest level senior Australian rules football competition in Australia, which was known as the Victorian Football League until 1989. The season featured sixteen clubs, ran from 20 March until 27 September, and comprised a 22-game home-and-away season followed by a finals series featuring the top eight clubs. A significant feature of the season was the celebration of the 150th anniversary since the sport of Australian rules football was first established in 1858.

The premiership was won by the Hawthorn Football Club for the tenth time, after they defeated Geelong by 26 points in the 2008 AFL Grand Final.

== NAB Cup ==
| | 2008 NAB Cup Grand Final |
| Saturday, 8 March | Adelaide 0.9.10 (64) | def. by | St Kilda 2.7.9 (69) | AAMI Stadium (crowd: 26,823) |

== Premiership season ==
=== Round 1 ===
| | Round 1 (Easter and Season Launch) |
| Thursday, 20 March | Carlton 11.13 (79) | def. by | Richmond 17.7 (109) | MCG (crowd: 72,552) | Report |
| Thursday, 20 March | Port Adelaide 14.12 (96) | def. by | Geelong 15.15 (105) | AAMI Stadium (crowd: 28,206) | Report |
| Saturday, 22 March | Collingwood 16.15 (111) | def. | Fremantle 13.7 (85) | MCG (crowd: 45,383) | Report |
| Saturday, 22 March | St Kilda 6.15 (51) | def. | Sydney 6.13 (49) | Telstra Dome (crowd: 36,614) | Report |
| Saturday, 22 March | West Coast 14.8 (92) | def. | Brisbane Lions 11.10 (76) | Subiaco Oval (crowd: 39,591) | Report |
| Sunday, 23 March | Western Bulldogs 19.12 (126) | def. | Adelaide 18.15 (123) | Telstra Dome (crowd: 24,835) | Report |
| Sunday, 23 March | Hawthorn 23.16 (154) | def. | Melbourne 6.14 (50) | MCG (crowd: 40,141) | Report |
| Monday, 24 March | North Melbourne 9.13 (67) | def. by | Essendon 19.8 (122) | Telstra Dome (crowd: 48,100) | Report |

=== Round 2 ===
| | Round 2 |
| Friday, 28 March | Brisbane Lions 13.18 (96) | def. | Collingwood 13.16 (94) | The Gabba (crowd: 33,867) | Report |
| Saturday, 29 March | Melbourne 9.12 (66) | def. by | Western Bulldogs 24.17 (161) | MCG (crowd: 27,821) | Report |
| Saturday, 29 March | Adelaide 21.7 (133) | def. | West Coast 8.9 (57) | AAMI Stadium (crowd: 38,162) | Report |
| Saturday, 29 March | St Kilda 19.11 (125) | def. | Carlton 12.13 (85) | Telstra Dome (crowd: 43,396) | Report |
| Saturday, 29 March | Fremantle 14.13 (97) | def. by | Hawthorn 16.16 (112) | Subiaco Oval (crowd: 38,022) | Report |
| Sunday, 30 March | Sydney 22.14 (146) | def. | Port Adelaide 11.12 (78) | SCG (crowd: 24,700) | Report |
| Sunday, 30 March | Geelong 22.18 (150) | def. | Essendon 6.15 (51) | Telstra Dome (crowd: 50,636) | Report |
| Sunday, 30 March | Richmond 13.8 (86) | def. by | North Melbourne 20.7 (127) | MCG (crowd: 39,292) | Report |

=== Round 3 ===
| | Round 3 (Rivalry Round) |
| Friday, 4 April | Western Bulldogs 19.11 (125) | def. | St Kilda 13.9 (87) | Telstra Dome (crowd: 38,667) | Report |
| Saturday, 5 April | North Melbourne 13.8 (86) | def. by | Hawthorn 15.12 (102) | Telstra Dome (crowd: 39,816) | Report |
| Saturday, 5 April | West Coast 10.13 (73) | def. by | Fremantle 12.15 (87) | Subiaco Oval (crowd: 39,027) | Report |
| Saturday, 5 April | Brisbane Lions 10.11 (71) | def. by | Sydney 13.10 (88) | The Gabba (crowd: 29,061) | Report |
| Saturday, 5 April | Essendon 23.12 (150) | def. | Carlton 21.8 (134) | MCG (crowd: 64,388) | Report |
| Sunday, 6 April | Geelong 16.16 (112) | def. | Melbourne 12.10 (82) | Skilled Stadium (crowd: 23,569) | Report |
| Sunday, 6 April | Richmond 11.12 (78) | def. by | Collingwood 18.14 (122) | MCG (crowd: 70,802) | Report |
| Sunday, 6 April | Adelaide 12.13 (85) | def. | Port Adelaide 11.13 (79) | AAMI Stadium (crowd: 45,524) | Report |

=== Round 4 ===
| | Round 4 |
| Friday, 11 April | Essendon 14.14 (98) | def. by | Western Bulldogs 19.14 (128) | Telstra Dome (crowd: 47,641) | Report |
| Saturday, 12 April | St Kilda 13.16 (94) | def. by | Geelong 21.10 (136) | Telstra Dome (crowd: 44,368) | Report |
| Saturday, 12 April | North Melbourne 18.19 (127) | def. | Melbourne 11.13 (79) | MCG (crowd: 23,427) (Moved from Gold Coast Stadium) | Report |
| Saturday, 12 April | Sydney 16.11 (107) | def. | West Coast 5.15 (45) | ANZ Stadium (crowd: 44,235) | Report |
| Saturday, 12 April | Port Adelaide 16.8 (104) | def. by | Brisbane Lions 18.16 (124) | AAMI Stadium (crowd: 25,205) | Report |
| Sunday, 13 April | Hawthorn 17.12 (114) | def. | Adelaide 10.10 (70) | Aurora Stadium (crowd: 15,124) | Report |
| Sunday, 13 April | Carlton 17.9 (111) | def. | Collingwood 13.10 (88) | MCG (crowd: 77,873) | Report |
| Sunday, 13 April | Fremantle 10.13 (73) | def. by | Richmond 20.17 (137) | Subiaco Oval (crowd: 37,541) | Report |
The match between North Melbourne and Melbourne was originally fixtured to be played at Gold Coast Stadium, however, due to North Melbourne's refusal to relocate north to the Gold Coast, the match was moved to the Melbourne Cricket Ground.

=== Round 5 ===
| | Round 5 |
| Friday, 18 April | St Kilda 18.15 (123) | def. | Essendon 14.3 (87) | Telstra Dome (crowd: 46,792) | Report |
| Saturday, 19 April | Geelong 16.18 (114) | def. | Sydney 10.12 (72) | Skilled Stadium (crowd: 24,368) | Report |
| Saturday, 19 April | Adelaide 12.16 (88) | def. | Fremantle 10.11 (71) | AAMI Stadium (crowd: 39,554) | Report |
| Saturday, 19 April | Brisbane Lions 17.16 (118) | def. by | Hawthorn 19.16 (130) | The Gabba (crowd: 30,019) | Report |
| Saturday, 19 April | Collingwood 15.15 (105) | def. by | North Melbourne 16.16 (112) | MCG (crowd: 51,990) | Report |
| Sunday, 20 April | Melbourne 9.14 (68) | def. by | Carlton 15.11 (101) | MCG (crowd: 44,759) | Report |
| Sunday, 20 April | Western Bulldogs 19.16 (130) | drew with | Richmond 20.10 (130) | Telstra Dome (crowd: 37,767) | Report |
| Sunday, 20 April | West Coast 16.8 (104) | def. by | Port Adelaide 19.14 (128) | Subiaco Oval (crowd: 38,302) | Report |

=== Round 6 ===
| | Round 6 (ANZAC Round) |
| Friday, 25 April | Collingwood 23.16 (154) | def. | Essendon 12.9 (81) | MCG (crowd: 88,999) | Report |
| Friday, 25 April | Fremantle 13.10 (88) | def. by | Geelong 13.11 (89) | Subiaco Oval (crowd: 38,022) | Report |
| Saturday, 26 April | Carlton 11.15 (81) | def. by | Adelaide 16.15 (111) | MCG (crowd: 41,033) | Report |
| Saturday, 26 April | Western Bulldogs 20.14 (134) | def. | West Coast 11.8 (74) | Telstra Dome (crowd: 29,927) | Report |
| Saturday, 26 April | Port Adelaide 12.10 (82) | def. | St Kilda 9.7 (61) | AAMI Stadium (crowd: 20,517) | Report |
| Sunday, 27 April | Brisbane Lions 19.23 (137) | def. | Melbourne 13.7 (85) | The Gabba (crowd: 22,878) | Report |
| Sunday, 27 April | North Melbourne 9.10 (64) | drew with | Sydney 8.16 (64) | Telstra Dome (crowd: 28,392) | Report |
| Sunday, 27 April | Hawthorn 14.22 (106) | def. | Richmond 15.4 (94) | MCG (crowd: 46,076) | Report |

=== Round 7 ===
| | Round 7 |
| Friday, 2 May | West Coast 10.14 (74) | def. by | Carlton 17.9 (111) | Subiaco Oval (crowd: 41,254) | Report |
| Saturday, 3 May | Geelong 15.15 (105) | def. | Brisbane Lions 11.12 (78) | Skilled Stadium (crowd: 23,388) | Report |
| Saturday, 3 May | Hawthorn 24.10 (154) | def. | Collingwood 13.11 (89) | MCG (crowd: 76,048) | Report |
| Saturday, 3 May | Richmond 16.11 (107) | def. by | St Kilda 17.8 (110) | Telstra Dome (crowd: 40,585) | Report |
| Saturday, 3 May | Adelaide 15.17 (107) | def. | North Melbourne 11.8 (74) | AAMI Stadium (crowd: 41,898) | Report |
| Sunday, 4 May | Sydney 14.10 (94) | def. by | Western Bulldogs 18.4 (112) | SCG (crowd: 29,018) | Report |
| Sunday, 4 May | Melbourne 17.17 (119) | def. | Fremantle 15.23 (113) | MCG (crowd: 19,423) | Report |
| Sunday, 4 May | Essendon 15.4 (94) | def. by | Port Adelaide 24.14 (158) | Telstra Dome (crowd: 28,409) | Report |

=== AFL Hall of Fame Tribute Match ===
| | AFL Hall of Fame Tribute Match |
| Saturday, 10 May | Victoria 21.11 (137) | def. | Dream Team 18.12 (120) | MCG (crowd: 69,294) | Report |

=== Round 8 ===
| | Round 8 |
| Friday, 16 May | St Kilda 14.10 (94) | def. by | Collingwood 16.7 (103) | Telstra Dome (crowd: 48,417) | Report |
| Saturday, 17 May | Hawthorn 17.15 (117) | def. | Port Adelaide 15.12 (102) | Aurora Stadium (crowd: 15,682) | Report |
| Saturday, 17 May | Richmond 10.9 (69) | def. by | Geelong 14.15 (99) | MCG (crowd: 37,275) | Report |
| Saturday, 17 May | Carlton 12.20 (92) | def. by | Brisbane Lions 18.17 (125) | Telstra Dome (crowd: 38,675) | Report |
| Saturday, 17 May | North Melbourne 13.11 (89) | def. | West Coast 12.11 (83) | Gold Coast Stadium (crowd: 6,354) | Report |
| Sunday, 18 May | Adelaide 22.18 (150) | def. | Melbourne 11.8 (74) | AAMI Stadium (crowd: 35,649) | Report |
| Sunday, 18 May | Sydney 21.17 (143) | def. | Essendon 7.10 (52) | ANZ Stadium (crowd: 34,904) | Report |
| Sunday, 18 May | Fremantle 17.9 (111) | def. by | Western Bulldogs 17.12 (114) | Subiaco Oval (crowd: 35,624) | Report |

=== Round 9 ===
| | Round 9 (Indigenous Round) |
| Friday, 23 May | Collingwood 20.14 (134) | def. | Geelong 7.6 (48) | MCG (crowd: 78,206) | Report |
| Saturday, 24 May | Carlton 14.13 (97) | def. | Fremantle 14.4 (88) | Telstra Dome (crowd: 28,955) | Report |
| Saturday, 24 May | Port Adelaide 14.10 (94) | def. by | Sydney 16.9 (105) | AAMI Stadium (crowd: 25,013) | Report |
| Saturday, 24 May | Essendon 10.12 (72) | def. by | Richmond 16.14 (110) | MCG (crowd: 60,333) | Report |
| Saturday, 24 May | West Coast 14.13 (97) | def. | Adelaide 5.17 (47) | Subiaco Oval (crowd: 35,348) | Report |
| Sunday, 25 May | Brisbane Lions 21.15 (141) | def. | St Kilda 14.11 (95) | The Gabba (crowd: 27,566) | Report |
| Sunday, 25 May | Melbourne 12.6 (78) | def. by | Hawthorn 14.13 (97) | MCG (crowd: 41,341) | Report |
| Sunday, 25 May | Western Bulldogs 16.14 (110) | def. by | North Melbourne 16.17 (113) | Telstra Dome (crowd: 35,471) | Report |

=== Round 10 ===
| | Round 10 |
| Friday, 30 May | Adelaide 9.20 (74) | def. | Essendon 10.9 (69) | AAMI Stadium (crowd: 41,897) | Report |
| Saturday, 31 May | Collingwood 27.11 (173) | def. | West Coast 10.13 (73) | MCG (crowd: 52,968) | Report |
| Saturday, 31 May | Hawthorn 12.2 (74) | def. by | Western Bulldogs 15.16 (106) | Aurora Stadium (crowd: 19,378) | Report |
| Saturday, 31 May | Brisbane Lions 18.21 (129) | def. | North Melbourne 15.8 (98) | The Gabba (crowd: 22,118) | Report |
| Saturday, 31 May | Geelong 19.19 (133) | def. | Carlton 12.5 (77) | Telstra Dome (crowd: 46,231) | Report |
| Sunday, 1 June | Sydney 21.13 (139) | def. | Richmond 8.9 (57) | SCG (crowd: 26,852) | Report |
| Sunday, 1 June | St Kilda 19.15 (129) | def. | Melbourne 7.8 (50) | Telstra Dome (crowd: 27,854) | Report |
| Sunday, 1 June | Fremantle 10.15 (75) | def. by | Port Adelaide 16.7 (103) | Subiaco Oval (crowd: 34,236) | Report |

=== Round 11 ===
| | Round 11 (Queens Birthday) |
| Friday, 6 June | North Melbourne 17.12 (114) | def. by | Geelong 19.13 (127) | Telstra Dome (crowd: 38,373) | Report |
| Saturday, 7 June | Richmond 14.12 (96) | def. by | Adelaide 22.14 (146) | MCG (crowd: 32,767) | Report |
| Saturday, 7 June | Essendon 12.7 (79) | def. by | Hawthorn 19.16 (130) | Telstra Dome (crowd: 46,377) | Report |
| Saturday, 7 June | West Coast 11.12 (78) | def. by | Sydney 12.11 (83) | Subiaco Oval (crowd: 38,802) | Report |
| Sunday, 8 June | Brisbane Lions 14.12 (96) | def. | Fremantle 10.14 (74) | The Gabba (crowd: 24,506) | Report |
| Sunday, 8 June | St Kilda 11.13 (79) | def. by | Western Bulldogs 15.16 (106) | Telstra Dome (crowd: 38,914) | Report |
| Sunday, 8 June | Port Adelaide 8.15 (63) | def. by | Carlton 10.15 (75) | AAMI Stadium (crowd: 29,240) | Report |
| Monday, 9 June | Melbourne 13.17 (95) | def. by | Collingwood 17.14 (116) | MCG (crowd: 59,548) | Report |

=== Round 12 ===
| | Round 12 |
| Friday, 13 June | Essendon 16.17 (113) | def. | West Coast 13.13 (91) | Telstra Dome (crowd: 33,386) | Report |
| Saturday, 14 June | Western Bulldogs 19.17 (131) | def. | Brisbane Lions 10.8 (68) | MCG (crowd: 39,320) | Report |
| Saturday, 14 June | Fremantle 18.12 (120) | def. | North Melbourne 9.13 (67) | Subiaco Oval (crowd: 34,105) | Report |
| Saturday, 14 June | Sydney 14.18 (102) | def. | St Kilda 9.13 (67) | SCG (crowd: 25,996) | Report |
| Saturday, 14 June | Adelaide 10.12 (72) | def. by | Hawthorn 11.10 (76) | AAMI Stadium (crowd: 44,559) | Report |
| Sunday, 15 June | Geelong 15.18 (108) | def. | Port Adelaide 7.7 (49) | Skilled Stadium (crowd: 21,642) | Report |
| Sunday, 15 June | Collingwood 12.17 (89) | def. by | Carlton 17.17 (119) | MCG (crowd: 80,310) | Report |
| Sunday, 15 June | Richmond 16.20 (116) | def. | Melbourne 14.10 (94) | Telstra Dome (crowd: 27,348) | Report |

=== Round 13 ===
| | Round 13 |
| Friday, 20 June | St Kilda 10.5 (65) | def. | Fremantle 8.9 (57) | Telstra Dome (crowd: 22,440) | Report |
| Saturday, 21 June | Hawthorn 10.16 (76) | def. by | North Melbourne 15.13 (103) | MCG (crowd: 42,508) | Report |
| Saturday, 21 June | Port Adelaide 19.9 (123) | def. by | Richmond 20.7 (127) | AAMI Stadium (crowd: 20,923) | Report |
| Saturday, 21 June | Brisbane Lions 11.17 (83) | def. | Adelaide 10.10 (70) | The Gabba (crowd: 29,964) | Report |
| Saturday, 21 June | West Coast 5.17 (47) | def. by | Geelong 28.14 (182) | Subiaco Oval (crowd: 38,414) | Report |
| Sunday, 22 June | Melbourne 11.8 (74) | def. by | Sydney 17.12 (114) | Manuka Oval (crowd: 11,437) | Report |
| Sunday, 22 June | Carlton 15.11 (101) | def. by | Essendon 20.16 (136) | MCG (crowd: 59,177) | Report |
| Sunday, 22 June | Collingwood 13.11 (89) | def. by | Western Bulldogs 15.9 (99) | Telstra Dome (crowd: 44,885) | Report |

=== Round 14 ===
| | Round 14 (Split Round) |
| Friday, 27 June | Hawthorn 18.18 (126) | def. | West Coast 9.15 (69) | MCG (crowd: 29,138) | Report |
| Saturday, 28 June | Richmond 12.16 (88) | def. by | Carlton 17.16 (118) | MCG (crowd: 73,503) | Report |
| Saturday, 28 June | North Melbourne 9.15 (69) | def. by | St Kilda 12.12 (84) | Gold Coast Stadium (crowd: 9,128) | Report |
| Saturday, 28 June | Western Bulldogs 20.15 (135) | def. | Port Adelaide 11.15 (81) | TIO Stadium (crowd: 11,373) | Report |
| Sunday, 29 June | Melbourne 14.9 (93) | def. | Brisbane Lions 13.14 (92) | MCG (crowd: 23,278) | Report |
| Sunday, 29 June | Fremantle 13.13 (91) | def. by | Essendon 14.11 (95) | Subiaco Oval (crowd: 34,239) | Report |
| Friday, 4 July | Adelaide 8.8 (56) | def. by | Geelong 18.16 (124) | AAMI Stadium (crowd: 44,377) | Report |
| Saturday, 5 July | Sydney 6.14 (50) | def. by | Collingwood 11.13 (79) | ANZ Stadium (crowd: 59,202) | Report |

=== Round 15 ===
| | Round 15 |
| Friday, 11 July | Carlton 12.15 (87) | def. by | St Kilda 18.11 (119) | MCG (crowd: 55,658) | Report |
| Saturday, 12 July | Collingwood 15.16 (106) | def. | Adelaide 11.8 (74) | MCG (crowd: 52,592) | Report |
| Saturday, 12 July | Geelong 18.10 (118) | def. | Fremantle 6.8 (44) | Skilled Stadium (crowd: 21,286) | Report |
| Saturday, 12 July | Essendon 24.11 (155) | def. | Brisbane Lions 18.10 (118) | Telstra Dome (crowd: 40,053) | Report |
| Saturday, 12 July | Port Adelaide 10.14 (74) | def. by | North Melbourne 10.16 (76) | AAMI Stadium (crowd: 19,851) | Report |
| Sunday, 13 July | Hawthorn 15.16 (106) | def. | Sydney 10.15 (75) | MCG (crowd: 49,529) | Report |
| Sunday, 13 July | Western Bulldogs 14.11 (95) | def. | Melbourne 9.10 (64) | Telstra Dome (crowd: 27,446) | Report |
| Sunday, 13 July | West Coast 11.9 (75) | def. by | Richmond 24.8 (152) | Subiaco Oval (crowd: 37,085) | Report |

=== Round 16 ===
| Home team | Home team score | Away team | Away team score | Ground | Crowd | Date | Report |
| North Melbourne | 17.12 (114) | Collingwood | 14.12 (96) | Telstra Dome | 46,610 | Friday, 18 July | AFL.com.au |
| Geelong | 19.17 (131) | Western Bulldogs | 10.10 (70) | Skilled Stadium | 24,801 | Saturday, 19 July | AFL.com.au |
| Richmond | 16.12 (108) | Essendon | 15.14 (104) | MCG | 56,746 | Saturday, 19 July | AFL.com.au |
| Brisbane Lions | 17.11 (113) | West Coast | 9.13 (67) | The Gabba | 27,784 | Saturday, 19 July | AFL.com.au |
| St Kilda | 18.11 (119) | Hawthorn | 13.11 (89) | Telstra Dome | 41,886 | Saturday, 19 July | AFL.com.au |
| Carlton | 18.11 (119) | Sydney | 18.13 (121) | Telstra Dome | 38,401 | Sunday, 20 July | AFL.com.au |
| Port Adelaide | 13.14 (92) | Adelaide | 11.14 (80) | AAMI Stadium | 31,662 | Sunday, 20 July | AFL.com.au |
| Fremantle | 16.18 (114) | Melbourne | 10.8 (68) | Subiaco | 31,638 | Sunday, 20 July | AFL.com.au |

=== Round 17 ===
| Home team | Home team score | Away team | Away team score | Ground | Crowd | Date | Report |
| Hawthorn | 11.11 (77) | Geelong | 12.16 (88) | MCG | 86,179 | Friday, 25 July | AFL.com.au |
| Essendon | 19.14 (128) | Collingwood | 11.14 (80) | MCG | 64,785 | Saturday, 26 July | AFL.com.au |
| West Coast | 15.13 (103) | St Kilda | 12.14 (86) | Subiaco | 34,037 | Saturday, 26 July | AFL.com.au |
| Richmond | 18.9 (117) | Brisbane Lions | 16.18 (114) | Telstra Dome | 31,275 | Saturday, 26 July | AFL.com.au |
| Sydney | 6.17 (53) | Adelaide | 11.11 (77) | SCG | 26,260 | Saturday, 26 July | AFL.com.au |
| Port Adelaide | 15.11 (101) | Fremantle | 20.9 (129) | AAMI Stadium | 19,072 | Sunday, 27 July | AFL.com.au |
| Melbourne | 10.10 (70) | North Melbourne | 14.14 (98) | MCG | 21,330 | Sunday, 27 July | AFL.com.au |
| Western Bulldogs | 15.8 (98) | Carlton | 18.18 (126) | Telstra Dome | 37,879 | Sunday, 27 July | AFL.com.au |

=== Round 18 ===
| Home team | Home team score | Away team | Away team score | Ground | Crowd | Date | Report |
| Collingwood | 8.14 (62) | Hawthorn | 17.14 (116) | MCG | 58,307 | Friday, 1 August | AFL.com.au |
| Essendon | 19.10 (124) | Melbourne | 17.6 (108) | MCG | 46,334 | Saturday, 2 August | AFL.com.au |
| Adelaide | 13.16 (94) | Carlton | 12.14 (86) | AAMI Stadium | 40,730 | Saturday, 2 August | AFL.com.au |
| Geelong | 20.14 (134) | Richmond | 10.11 (71) | Telstra Dome | 42,238 | Saturday, 2 August | AFL.com.au |
| North Melbourne | 13.14 (92) | Brisbane Lions | 11.18 (84) | Gold Coast Stadium | 10,037 | Saturday, 2 August | AFL.com.au |
| Western Bulldogs | 17.11 (113) | Sydney | 14.13 (97) | Manuka Oval | 13,550 | Sunday, 3 August | AFL.com.au |
| St Kilda | 14.17 (101) | Port Adelaide | 14.9 (93) | Telstra Dome | 22,878 | Sunday, 3 August | AFL.com.au |
| Fremantle | 17.14 (116) | West Coast | 12.11 (83) | Subiaco | 42,096 | Sunday, 3 August | AFL.com.au |

=== Round 19 ===
| Home team | Home team score | Away team | Away team score | Ground | Crowd | Date | Report |
| Melbourne | 5.11 (41) | Geelong | 24.13 (157) | MCG | 34,610 | Friday, 8 August | AFL.com.au |
| Carlton | 18.24 (132) | Port Adelaide | 9.12 (66) | Telstra Dome | 29,696 | Saturday, 9 August | AFL.com.au |
| Hawthorn | 16.14 (110) | Brisbane Lions | 5.11 (41) | Aurora Stadium | 19,929 | Saturday, 9 August | AFL.com.au |
| Collingwood | 14.13 (97) | St Kilda | 12.11 (83) | MCG | 52,135 | Saturday, 9 August | AFL.com.au |
| Sydney | 17.10 (112) | Fremantle | 15.18 (108) | SCG | 20,846 | Saturday, 9 August | AFL.com.au |
| North Melbourne | 21.10 (136) | Western Bulldogs | 18.8 (116) | Telstra Dome | 31,957 | Sunday, 10 August | AFL.com.au |
| Adelaide | 16.12 (108) | Richmond | 6.9 (45) | AAMI Stadium | 37,562 | Sunday, 10 August | AFL.com.au |
| West Coast | 17.11 (113) | Essendon | 16.7 (103) | Subiaco | 35,288 | Sunday, 10 August | AFL.com.au |

=== Round 20 ===
| Home team | Home team score | Away team | Away team score | Ground | Crowd | Date | Report |
| Port Adelaide | 10.15 (75) | Collingwood | 16.10 (106) | AAMI Stadium | 23,694 | Friday, 15 August | AFL.com.au |
| Essendon | 10.13 (73) | Adelaide | 19.15 (129) | Telstra Dome | 32,184 | Saturday, 16 August | AFL.com.au |
| Melbourne | 11.13 (79) | West Coast | 5.15 (45) | MCG | 17,958 | Saturday, 16 August | AFL.com.au |
| Brisbane Lions | 13.12 (90) | Western Bulldogs | 10.19 (79) | The Gabba | 27,315 | Saturday, 16 August | AFL.com.au |
| Sydney | 14.10 (94) | Geelong | 20.13 (133) | ANZ Stadium | 44,955 | Saturday, 16 August | AFL.com.au |
| Richmond | 16.9 (105) | Hawthorn | 10.16 (76) | MCG | 44,523 | Sunday, 17 August | AFL.com.au |
| Carlton | 14.6 (90) | North Melbourne | 22.9 (141) | Telstra Dome | 43,406 | Sunday, 17 August | AFL.com.au |
| Fremantle | 9.15 (69) | St Kilda | 17.10 (112) | Subiaco | 34,014 | Sunday, 17 August | AFL.com.au |

=== Round 21 ===
| Home team | Home team score | Away team | Away team score | Ground | Crowd | Date | Report |
| Western Bulldogs | 23.13 (151) | Essendon | 15.15 (105) | Telstra Dome | 37,294 | Friday, 22 August | AFL.com.au |
| Richmond | 15.15 (105) | Fremantle | 15.8 (98) | MCG | 24,881 | Saturday, 23 August | AFL.com.au |
| Port Adelaide | 18.21 (129) | Melbourne | 7.9 (51) | AAMI Stadium | 18,875 | Saturday, 23 August | AFL.com.au |
| Brisbane Lions | 16.13 (109) | Carlton | 18.7 (115) | The Gabba | 34,327 | Saturday, 23 August | AFL.com.au |
| Collingwood | 18.10 (118) | Sydney | 10.13 (73) | Telstra Dome | 45,507 | Saturday, 23 August | AFL.com.au |
| Geelong | 17.13 (115) | North Melbourne | 13.4 (82) | Skilled Stadium | 24,288 | Sunday, 24 August | AFL.com.au |
| St Kilda | 13.17 (95) | Adelaide | 6.11 (47) | Telstra Dome | 33,811 | Sunday, 24 August | AFL.com.au |
| West Coast | 9.8 (62) | Hawthorn | 19.19 (133) | Subiaco | 37,040 | Sunday, 24 August | AFL.com.au |

=== Round 22 ===
| Home team | Home team score | Away team | Away team score | Ground | Crowd | Date | Report |
| Fremantle | 12.8 (80) | Collingwood | 8.8 (56) | Subiaco | 35,106 | Friday, 29 August | AFL.com.au |
| North Melbourne | 10.12 (72) | Port Adelaide | 23.10 (148) | MCG | 22,144 | Saturday, 30 August | AFL.com.au |
| Geelong | 24.20 (164) | West Coast | 10.5 (65) | Skilled Stadium | 21,752 | Saturday, 30 August | AFL.com.au |
| Adelaide | 10.16 (76) | Western Bulldogs | 9.13 (67) | AAMI Stadium | 37,545 | Saturday, 30 August | AFL.com.au |
| Carlton | 12.9 (81) | Hawthorn | 24.15 (159) | Telstra Dome | 49,057 | Saturday, 30 August | AFL.com.au |
| Sydney | 17.12 (114) | Brisbane Lions | 6.17 (53) | SCG | 24,076 | Saturday, 30 August | AFL.com.au |
| Melbourne | 6.5 (41) | Richmond | 18.13 (121) | MCG | 37,046 | Sunday, 31 August | AFL.com.au |
| Essendon | 5.9 (39) | St Kilda | 21.21 (147) | Telstra Dome | 46,161 | Sunday, 31 August | AFL.com.au |

== Win/loss table ==
| Team | 1 | 2 | 3 | 4 | 5 | 6 | 7 | 8 | 9 | 10 | 11 | 12 | 13 | 14 | 15 | 16 | 17 | 18 | 19 | 20 | 21 | 22 | F1 | F2 | F3 | GF | Ladder |
|---|---|---|---|---|---|---|---|---|---|---|---|---|---|---|---|---|---|---|---|---|---|---|---|---|---|---|---|
| Adelaide | WB −3 | **WCE** **+76** | **PA** **+6** | Haw −44 | **Frem** **+17** | Carl +30 | **NM** **+33** | **Melb** **+76** | WCE −50 | **Ess** **+5** | Rich +50 | **Haw** **−4** | BL −13 | **Geel** **−68** | Coll −32 | PA −12 | Syd +24 | **Carl** **+8** | **Rich** **+63** | Ess +56 | StK −48 | **WB** **+9** | **Coll** **−31** | X | X | X | **5** |
| Brisbane Lions | WCE −16 | **Coll** **+2** | **Syd** **−17** | PA +20 | **Haw** **−12** | **Melb** **+52** | Geel −27 | Carl +33 | **StK** **+46** | **NM** **+31** | **Frem** **+22** | WB −63 | **Adel** **+13** | Melb −1 | Ess −37 | **WCE** **+46** | Rich −3 | NM −8 | Haw −69 | **WB** **+11** | **Carl** **−6** | Syd −61 | X | X | X | X | 10 |
| Carlton | **Rich** **−30** | StK −40 | Ess −16 | **Coll** **+23** | **Melb** **+33** | **Adel** **−30** | WCE +37 | **BL** **−33** | **Frem** **+9** | Geel −56 | PA +12 | Coll +30 | **Ess** **−35** | Rich +30 | **StK** **−32** | **Syd** **−2** | WB +28 | Adel −8 | **PA** **+66** | **NM** **−51** | BL +6 | **Haw** **−78** | X | X | X | X | 11 |
| Collingwood | **Frem** **+26** | BL −2 | Rich +44 | Carl −23 | **NM** **−7** | **Ess** **+73** | Haw +65 | StK +9 | **Geel** **+86** | **WCE** **+100** | Melb +21 | **Carl** **−30** | **WB** **−10** | Syd +29 | **Adel** **+32** | NM −18 | Ess −48 | **Haw** **−54** | **StK** **+14** | PA +31 | **Syd** **+45** | Frem −24 | Adel +31 | StK −34 | X | X | **8** |
| Essendon | NM +55 | Geel −99 | **Carl** **+16** | WB −30 | StK −36 | Coll −73 | **PA** **−64** | Syd −91 | Rich −38 | Adel −5 | **Haw** **−51** | **WCE** **+22** | Carl +35 | Frem +4 | **BL** **+37** | Rich −4 | **Coll** **+48** | **Melb** **+16** | WCE −10 | **Adel** **−56** | WB −46 | **StK** **−108** | X | X | X | X | 12 |
| Fremantle | Coll −26 | **Haw** **−15** | WCE +14 | **Rich** **−64** | Adel −17 | **Geel** **−1** | Melb −6 | **WB** **−3** | Carl −9 | **PA** **−28** | BL −24 | **NM** **+53** | StK −8 | **Ess** **−4** | Geel −74 | **Melb** **+46** | PA +28 | **WCE** **+33** | Syd −4 | **StK** **−43** | Rich −7 | **Coll** **+24** | X | X | X | X | 14 |
| Geelong | PA +9 | **Ess** **+99** | **Melb** **+30** | StK +42 | **Syd** **+42** | Frem +1 | **BL** **+27** | Rich +30 | Coll −86 | **Carl** **+56** | NM +13 | **PA** **+59** | WCE +135 | Adel +68 | **Frem** **+74** | **WB** **+61** | Haw +11 | **Rich** **+63** | Melb +116 | Syd +39 | **NM** **+33** | **WCE** **+99** | **StK** **+58** | X | **WB** **+29** | **Haw** **−26** | **1** |
| Hawthorn | **Melb** **+104** | Frem +15 | NM +16 | **Adel** **+44** | BL +12 | **Rich** **+12** | **Coll** **+65** | **PA** **+15** | Melb +19 | **WB** **−32** | Ess +51 | Adel +4 | **NM** **−27** | **WCE** **+57** | **Syd** **+31** | StK −30 | **Geel** **−11** | Coll +54 | **BL** **+69** | Rich −29 | WCE +71 | Carl +78 | **WB** **+51** | X | **StK** **+54** | Geel +26 | **2** |
| Melbourne | Haw −104 | **WB** **−95** | Geel −30 | NM −48 | **Carl** **−33** | BL −53 | **Frem** **+6** | Adel −76 | **Haw** **−19** | StK −79 | **Coll** **−21** | Rich −22 | **Syd** **−40** | **BL** **+1** | WB −31 | Frem −46 | **NM** **−28** | Ess −16 | **Geel** **−116** | **WCE** **+34** | PA −78 | **Rich** **−80** | X | X | X | X | 16 |
| North Melbourne | **Ess** **−55** | Rich +41 | **Haw** **−16** | **Melb** **+48** | Coll +7 | **Syd**; **0** | Adel −33 | **WCE** **+6** | WB +3 | BL −31 | **Geel** **−13** | Frem −53 | Haw +27 | **StK** **−15** | PA +2 | **Coll** **+18** | Melb +28 | **BL** **+8** | **WB** **+20** | Carl +51 | Geel −33 | **PA** **−76** | Syd −35 | X | X | X | **7** |
| Port Adelaide | **Geel** **−9** | Syd −68 | Adel −6 | **BL** **−20** | WCE +24 | **StK** **+21** | Ess +64 | Haw −15 | **Syd** **−11** | Frem +28 | **Carl** **−12** | Geel −59 | **Rich** **−4** | WB −54 | **NM** **−2** | **Adel** **+12** | **Frem** **−28** | StK −8 | Carl −66 | **Coll** **−31** | **Melb** **+78** | NM +76 | X | X | X | X | 13 |
| Richmond | Carl +30 | **NM** **−41** | **Coll** **−44** | Frem +64 | WB; 0 | Haw −12 | **StK** **−3** | **Geel** **−30** | Ess +38 | Syd −82 | **Adel** **−50** | **Melb** **+22** | PA +4 | **Carl** **−30** | WCE +77 | **Ess** **+4** | **BL** **+3** | Geel −63 | Adel −63 | **Haw** **+29** | **Frem** **+7** | Melb +80 | X | X | X | X | 9 |
| St Kilda | **Syd** **+2** | **Carl** **+40** | WB −38 | **Geel** **−42** | **Ess** **+36** | PA −21 | Rich +3 | **Coll** **−9** | BL −46 | **Melb** **+79** | **WB** **−27** | Syd −35 | **Frem** **+8** | NM +15 | Carl +32 | **Haw** **+30** | WCE −17 | **PA** **+8** | Coll −14 | Frem +43 | **Adel** **+48** | Ess +108 | Geel −58 | **Coll** **+34** | Haw −54 | X | **4** |
| Sydney | StK −2 | **PA** **+68** | BL +17 | **WCE** **+62** | Geel −42 | NM; 0 | **WB** **−18** | **Ess** **+91** | PA +11 | **Rich** **+82** | WCE +5 | **StK** **+35** | Melb +40 | **Coll** **−29** | Haw −31 | Carl +2 | **Adel** **−24** | WB −16 | **Frem** **+4** | **Geel** **−39** | Coll −45 | **BL** **+61** | **NM** **+35** | WB −37 | X | X | **6** |
| West Coast | **BL** **+16** | Adel −76 | **Frem** **−14** | Syd −62 | **PA** **−24** | WB −60 | **Carl** **−37** | NM −6 | **Adel** **+50** | Coll −100 | **Syd** **−5** | Ess −22 | **Geel** **−135** | Haw −57 | **Rich** **−77** | BL −46 | **StK** **+17** | Frem −33 | **Ess** **+10** | Melb −34 | **Haw** **−71** | Geel −99 | X | X | X | X | 15 |
| Western Bulldogs | **Adel** **+3** | Melb +95 | **StK** **+38** | Ess +30 | **Rich**; **0** | **WCE** **+60** | Syd +18 | Frem +3 | **NM** **−3** | Haw +32 | StK +27 | **BL** **+63** | Coll +10 | **PA** **+54** | **Melb** **+31** | Geel −61 | **Carl** **−28** | **Syd** **+16** | NM −20 | BL −11 | **Ess** **+46** | Adel −9 | Haw −51 | **Syd** **+37** | Geel −29 | X | **3** |
| Team | 1 | 2 | 3 | 4 | 5 | 6 | 7 | 8 | 9 | 10 | 11 | 12 | 13 | 14 | 15 | 16 | 17 | 18 | 19 | 20 | 21 | 22 | F1 | F2 | F3 | GF | Ladder |

| + | Win | Qualified for finals |
| − | Loss | Eliminated |

Bold – Home game

== Ladder ==
2008 AFL ladder
| Pos | Team | Pld | W | L | D | PF | PA | PP | Pts | |
|---|---|---|---|---|---|---|---|---|---|---|
| 1 | Geelong | 22 | 21 | 1 | 0 | 2672 | 1651 | 161.8 | 84 | Finals series |
| 2 | Hawthorn (P) | 22 | 17 | 5 | 0 | 2434 | 1846 | 131.9 | 68 | Finals series |
| 3 | Western Bulldogs | 22 | 15 | 6 | 1 | 2506 | 2112 | 118.7 | 62 | Finals series |
| 4 | St Kilda | 22 | 13 | 9 | 0 | 2126 | 1923 | 110.6 | 52 | Finals series |
| 5 | Adelaide | 22 | 13 | 9 | 0 | 2017 | 1838 | 109.7 | 52 | Finals series |
| 6 | Sydney | 22 | 12 | 9 | 1 | 2095 | 1863 | 112.5 | 50 | Finals series |
| 7 | North Melbourne | 22 | 12 | 9 | 1 | 2121 | 2187 | 97.0 | 50 | Finals series |
| 8 | Collingwood | 22 | 12 | 10 | 0 | 2267 | 2038 | 111.2 | 48 | Finals series |
| 9 | Richmond | 22 | 11 | 10 | 1 | 2228 | 2288 | 97.4 | 46 | |
| 10 | Brisbane | 22 | 10 | 12 | 0 | 2156 | 2200 | 98.0 | 40 | |
| 11 | Carlton | 22 | 10 | 12 | 0 | 2217 | 2354 | 94.2 | 40 | |
| 12 | Essendon | 22 | 8 | 14 | 0 | 2130 | 2608 | 81.7 | 32 | |
| 13 | Port Adelaide | 22 | 7 | 15 | 0 | 2118 | 2208 | 95.9 | 28 | |
| 14 | Fremantle | 22 | 6 | 16 | 0 | 1988 | 2121 | 93.7 | 24 | |
| 15 | West Coast | 22 | 4 | 18 | 0 | 1670 | 2535 | 65.9 | 16 | |
| 16 | Melbourne | 22 | 3 | 19 | 0 | 1629 | 2602 | 62.6 | 12 | |

Source: AFL ladder
Rules for classification: 1) points; 2) percentage; 3) number of points for.
(P) Premiers

=== Ladder progression ===
Numbers highlighted in green indicate that the team finished the round inside the top 8.
Numbers highlighted in blue indicates the team finished first on the ladder in that round.
Numbers highlighted in red indicates the team finished in last place on the ladder in that round.

| Team ╲ Round | 1 | 2 | 3 | 4 | 5 | 6 | 7 | 8 | 9 | 10 | 11 | 12 | 13 | 14 | 15 | 16 | 17 | 18 | 19 | 20 | 21 | 22 |
|---|---|---|---|---|---|---|---|---|---|---|---|---|---|---|---|---|---|---|---|---|---|---|
| Geelong | 4 | 8 | 12 | 16 | 20 | 24 | 28 | 32 | 32 | 36 | 40 | 44 | 48 | 52 | 56 | 60 | 64 | 68 | 72 | 76 | 80 | 84 |
| Hawthorn | 4 | 8 | 12 | 16 | 20 | 24 | 28 | 32 | 36 | 36 | 40 | 44 | 44 | 48 | 52 | 52 | 52 | 56 | 60 | 60 | 64 | 68 |
| Western Bulldogs | 4 | 8 | 12 | 16 | 18 | 22 | 26 | 30 | 30 | 34 | 38 | 42 | 46 | 50 | 54 | 54 | 54 | 58 | 58 | 58 | 62 | 62 |
| St Kilda | 4 | 8 | 8 | 8 | 12 | 12 | 16 | 16 | 16 | 20 | 20 | 20 | 24 | 28 | 32 | 36 | 36 | 40 | 40 | 44 | 48 | 52 |
| Adelaide | 0 | 4 | 8 | 8 | 12 | 16 | 20 | 24 | 24 | 28 | 32 | 32 | 32 | 32 | 32 | 32 | 36 | 40 | 44 | 48 | 48 | 52 |
| Sydney | 0 | 4 | 8 | 12 | 12 | 14 | 14 | 18 | 22 | 26 | 30 | 34 | 38 | 38 | 38 | 42 | 42 | 42 | 46 | 46 | 46 | 50 |
| North Melbourne | 0 | 4 | 4 | 8 | 12 | 14 | 14 | 18 | 22 | 22 | 22 | 22 | 26 | 26 | 30 | 34 | 38 | 42 | 46 | 50 | 50 | 50 |
| Collingwood | 4 | 4 | 8 | 8 | 8 | 12 | 12 | 16 | 20 | 24 | 28 | 28 | 28 | 32 | 36 | 36 | 36 | 36 | 40 | 44 | 48 | 48 |
| Richmond | 4 | 4 | 4 | 8 | 10 | 10 | 10 | 10 | 14 | 14 | 14 | 18 | 22 | 22 | 26 | 30 | 34 | 34 | 34 | 38 | 42 | 46 |
| Brisbane Lions | 0 | 4 | 4 | 8 | 8 | 12 | 12 | 16 | 20 | 24 | 28 | 28 | 32 | 32 | 32 | 36 | 36 | 36 | 36 | 40 | 40 | 40 |
| Carlton | 0 | 0 | 0 | 4 | 8 | 8 | 12 | 12 | 16 | 16 | 20 | 24 | 24 | 28 | 28 | 28 | 32 | 32 | 36 | 36 | 40 | 40 |
| Essendon | 4 | 4 | 8 | 8 | 8 | 8 | 8 | 8 | 8 | 8 | 8 | 12 | 16 | 20 | 24 | 24 | 28 | 32 | 32 | 32 | 32 | 32 |
| Port Adelaide | 0 | 0 | 0 | 0 | 4 | 8 | 12 | 12 | 12 | 16 | 16 | 16 | 16 | 16 | 16 | 20 | 20 | 20 | 20 | 20 | 24 | 28 |
| Fremantle | 0 | 0 | 4 | 4 | 4 | 4 | 4 | 4 | 4 | 4 | 4 | 8 | 8 | 8 | 8 | 12 | 16 | 20 | 20 | 20 | 20 | 24 |
| West Coast | 4 | 4 | 4 | 4 | 4 | 4 | 4 | 4 | 8 | 8 | 8 | 8 | 8 | 8 | 8 | 8 | 12 | 12 | 16 | 16 | 16 | 16 |
| Melbourne | 0 | 0 | 0 | 0 | 0 | 0 | 4 | 4 | 4 | 4 | 4 | 4 | 4 | 8 | 8 | 8 | 8 | 8 | 8 | 12 | 12 | 12 |

== Finals series ==
Qualifying and elimination finals
Sep 7, MCG
1 | Geelong | 17.17 (119)
4 | St Kilda | 8.13 (61)
Sep 6, AAMI Stadium
5 | Adelaide | 14.10 (94)
8 | Collingwood | 19.11 (125)
Sep 6, ANZ Stadium
6 | Sydney | 17.8 (110)
7 | North Melbourne | 11.9 (75)
Sep 5, MCG
2 | Hawthorn | 18.19 (127)
3 | Western Bulldogs | 11.10 (76)

Semi-finals
Sep 13, MCG
St Kilda | 17.4 (106)
Collingwood | 9.18 (72)
Sep 12, MCG
Western Bulldogs | 16.10 (106)
Sydney | 9.15 (69)

Preliminary finals
Sep 19, MCG
Geelong | 12.11 (83)
Western Bulldogs | 7.12 (54)
Sep 20, MCG
Hawthorn | 18.10 (118)
St Kilda | 9.10 (64)

Grand final
Sep 27, MCG
Geelong | 11.23 (89)
Hawthorn | 18.7 (115)

=== Week one ===
| | Qualifying finals |
| QF2: Friday, 5 September | Hawthorn 18.19 (127) | def. | Western Bulldogs 11.10 (76) | MCG (crowd: 76,703) | Report |
| QF1: Sunday, 7 September | Geelong 17.17 (119) | def. | St Kilda 8.13 (61) | MCG (crowd: 71,653) | Report |

| | Elimination finals |
| EF1: Saturday, 6 September | Adelaide 14.10 (94) | def. by | Collingwood 19.11 (125) | AAMI Stadium (crowd: 37,685) | Report |
| EF2: Saturday, 6 September | Sydney 17.8 (110) | def. | North Melbourne 11.9 (75) | ANZ Stadium (crowd: 19,127) | Report |

=== Week two ===
| | Semi-finals |
| SF2: Friday, 12 September | Western Bulldogs 16.10 (106) | def. | Sydney 9.15 (69) | MCG (crowd: 42,731) | Report |
| SF1: Saturday, 13 September | St Kilda 17.4 (106) | def. | Collingwood 9.18 (72) | MCG (crowd: 76,707) | Report |

=== Week three ===
| | Preliminary finals |
| PF1: Friday, 19 September | Geelong 12.11 (83) | def. | Western Bulldogs 7.12 (54) | MCG (crowd: 70,143) | Report |
| PF2: Saturday, 20 September | Hawthorn 18.10 (118) | def. | St Kilda 9.10 (64) | MCG (crowd: 77,002) | Report |

=== Week four ===
| | Grand Final |
| Saturday, 27 September (2:30 pm) | Geelong 11.23 (89) | def. by | Hawthorn 18.7 (115) | MCG (crowd: 100,012) | Report |

== Statistics ==
=== Leading goalkickers ===
^{updated after grand final}

The Coleman Medal was awarded to Lance Franklin for kicking the most goals at the end of the home and away season.

| | Player | Club | Games | Goals | | | Best Performance | | |
| | Player | Club | Games | Season | Finals | Total | Goals | Opponent(s) | Round(s) |
|---|---|---|---|---|---|---|---|---|---|
| 1 | Lance Franklin | Hawthorn | 25 | 102 | 11 | 113 | 9 | Essendon | 11 |
| 2 | Brendan Fevola | Carlton | 22 | 99 | – | 99 | 8 | Essendon, Collingwood | 3, 11 |
| 3 | Daniel Bradshaw | Brisbane Lions | 20 | 75 | – | 75 | 7 | Hawthorn | 5 |
| 4 | Jarryd Roughead | Hawthorn | 24 | 66 | 9 | 75 | 6 | Collingwood, West Coast | 7, 14 |
| 5 | Jonathan Brown | Brisbane Lions | 21 | 70 | – | 70 | 6 | Carlton, St Kilda, North Melbourne | 8, 9, 10 |
| 6 | Matthew Pavlich | Fremantle | 19 | 67 | – | 67 | 8 | North Melbourne | 12 |
| 7 | Nick Riewoldt | St Kilda | 24 | 56 | 9 | 65 | 6 | Hawthorn | 16 |
| 8 | Matthew Lloyd | Essendon | 21 | 62 | – | 62 | 8 | Melbourne | 18 |
| 9 | Stephen Milne | St Kilda | 24 | 54 | 6 | 60 | 7 | Richmond, Essendon | 7, 22 |
| 10 | Daniel Motlop | Port Adelaide | 21 | 57 | – | 57 | 7 | Essendon | 7 |

=== Disposals ===
| Rank | Player | Team | Total |
|---|---|---|---|
| 1 | Joel Corey | Geelong | 730 |
| 2 | Jimmy Bartel | Geelong | 702 |
| 3 | Sam Mitchell | Hawthorn | 667 |
| 4 | Daniel Cross | Western Bulldogs | 663 |
| 5 | Adam Cooney | Western Bulldogs | 637 |
| 6 | Matthew Boyd | Western Bulldogs | 629 |
| 7 | Kane Cornes | Port Adelaide | 613 |
| 8 | Joel Selwood | Geelong | 607 |
| 9 | Gary Ablett, Jr. | Geelong | 606 |
| 10 | Dane Swan | Collingwood | 590 |

=== Kicks ===
| Rank | Player | Team | Total |
|---|---|---|---|
| 1 | Leigh Montagna | St Kilda | 388 |
| 2 | Jimmy Bartel | Geelong | 382 |
| 3 | Dane Swan | Collingwood | 368 |
| 4 | Sam Fisher | St Kilda | 359 |
| 5 | Lindsay Gilbee | Western Bulldogs | 352 |
| 6 | Brent Harvey | North Melbourne | 339 |
| 7 | Joel Corey | Geelong | 339 |
| 7 | Brendon Goddard | St Kilda | 337 |
| 9 | Nick Dal Santo | St Kilda | 336 |
| 10 | Marc Murphy | Carlton | 335 |

=== Handballs ===
| Rank | Player | Team | Total |
|---|---|---|---|
| 1 | Daniel Cross | Western Bulldogs | 422 |
| 2 | Joel Corey | Geelong | 391 |
| 3 | Sam Mitchell | Hawthorn | 354 |
| 4 | Kane Cornes | Port Adelaide | 345 |
| 5 | Adam Cooney | Western Bulldogs | 326 |
| 6 | Joel Selwood | Geelong | 324 |
| 7 | Lenny Hayes | St Kilda | 322 |
| 8 | Jimmy Bartel | Geelong | 320 |
| 9 | Shane Tuck | Richmond | 318 |
| 10 | Gary Ablett, Jr. | Geelong | 318 |

=== Marks ===
| Rank | Player | Team | Total |
|---|---|---|---|
| 1 | Nick Riewoldt | St Kilda | 240 |
| 2 | Samuel Fisher | St Kilda | 228 |
| 3 | Matthew Richardson | Richmond | 220 |
| 4 | Robert Murphy | Western Bulldogs | 204 |
| 5 | Cameron Mooney | Geelong | 201 |
| 6 | Brendon Goddard | St Kilda | 182 |
| 7 | Paul Medhurst | Collingwood | 179 |
| 8 | Brian Lake | Western Bulldogs | 175 |
| 9 | Brad Johnson | Western Bulldogs | 172 |
| 10 | Clinton Young | Hawthorn | 172 |

=== Tackles ===
| Rank | Player | Team | Total |
|---|---|---|---|
| 1 | Brett Kirk | Sydney | 151 |
| 2 | Lenny Hayes | St Kilda | 144 |
| 3 | Jude Bolton | Sydney | 143 |
| 4 | Joel Corey | Geelong | 138 |
| 5 | Domenic Cassisi | Port Adelaide | 133 |
| 6 | Jimmy Bartel | Geelong | 124 |
| 7 | Daniel Cross | Western Bulldogs | 117 |
| 8 | Martin Mattner | Sydney | 126 |
| 9 | James Kelly | Geelong | 112 |
| 10 | Daniel Harris | North Melbourne | 109 |

=== Hitouts ===
| Rank | Player | Team | Total |
|---|---|---|---|
| 1 | Aaron Sandilands | Fremantle | 646 |
| 2 | Dean Cox | West Coast | 571 |
| 3 | Darren Jolly | Sydney | 543 |
| 4 | Mark Blake | Geelong | 525 |
| 5 | Jamie Charman | Brisbane Lions | 434 |
| 6 | Steven King | St Kilda | 408 |
| 7 | Dean Brogan | Port Adelaide | 397 |
| 8 | David Hille | Essendon | 364 |
| 9 | Troy Simmonds | Richmond | 359 |
| 10 | Robert Campbell | Hawthorn | 358 |

== Awards ==
- The 2008 Brownlow Medal for the AFL's fairest and best player was awarded to Adam Cooney, of the Western Bulldogs, who polled 24 votes.
- The Leigh Matthews Trophy as the AFL's most valuable player was awarded to Gary Ablett, Jr., of Geelong.
- The Coleman Medal was awarded to Lance Franklin of Hawthorn, who kicked 102 goals during the home and away season.
- The Norm Smith Medal as the player adjudged best afield in the AFL Grand Final was awarded to Luke Hodge, of Hawthorn.
- The McClelland Trophy was awarded to Geelong for holding top position on the ladder after 22 rounds.
- The Wooden Spoon was obtained by Melbourne who finished the season in last place on the ladder after 22 rounds.
- Chris Judd from Carlton was named the captain of the 2008 All-Australian Team, with seven Geelong players named and nine players made their All-Australian debuts.
- The AFL Mark of the Year and Alex Jesaulenko Medal was awarded to Matthew Lloyd of Essendon for a spectacular high mark against Melbourne in round 19.
- The AFL Goal of the Year and Phil Manassa Medal was awarded to Leon Davis of Collingwood for his chase, tackle and goal against Fremantle in round 22.
- The AFL Army Award was awarded to Brett Deledio for the footballer who displays the most courageous and/or team related act of the season, for running with the flight of the ball to attempt a mark in the final minutes of Richmond's round 7 loss to St Kilda.

=== Coleman Medal ===
- Numbers highlighted in blue indicates the player led the count in that round.

| | Player | 1 | 2 | 3 | 4 | 5 | 6 | 7 | 8 | 9 | 10 | 11 | 12 | 13 | 14 | 15 | 16 | 17 | 18 | 19 | 20 | 21 | 22 | Total |
|---|---|---|---|---|---|---|---|---|---|---|---|---|---|---|---|---|---|---|---|---|---|---|---|---|
| 1 | Lance Franklin | 6 | 4 | 5 | 6 | 8 | 1 | 6 | 6 | 3 | 5 | 9 | 1 | 1 | 5 | 4 | 3 | 4 | 8 | 6 | 3 | 4 | 4 | 102 |
| 2 | Brendan Fevola | 2 | 2 | 8 | 7 | 7 | 1 | 4 | 5 | 1 | 3 | 2 | 8 | 7 | 4 | 3 | 5 | 6 | 5 | 4 | 6 | 2 | 7 | 99 |
| 3 | Daniel Bradshaw | 3 | 3 | 5 | 5 | 7 | 6 | 1 | 1 | 6 | 6 | 0 | - | - | 4 | 4 | 4 | 3 | 5 | 2 | 2 | 6 | 2 | 75 |
| 4 | Jonathan Brown | 6 | 2 | 1 | 4 | 0 | 2 | - | 6 | 6 | 6 | 3 | 3 | 2 | 5 | 5 | 3 | 3 | 5 | 1 | 3 | 4 | 0 | 70 |
| 5 | Matthew Pavlich | 1 | 3 | 5 | 3 | 0 | 5 | 5 | 4 | 4 | 1 | 3 | 8 | 5 | 6 | 1 | 5 | - | 4 | 1 | 3 | - | - | 67 |
| 6 | Jarryd Roughead | 3 | 4 | 4 | 1 | 1 | 5 | 6 | 3 | 1 | 4 | 3 | 3 | 2 | 6 | 3 | 3 | 2 | 4 | 1 | 0 | 2 | 5 | 66 |
| 7 | Matthew Lloyd | 6 | 0 | 4 | - | 0 | 3 | 5 | 1 | 4 | 1 | 2 | 2 | 4 | 1 | 4 | 2 | 4 | 8 | 3 | 3 | 4 | 1 | 62 |
| 8 | Daniel Motlop | 2 | 2 | 2 | 0 | 4 | 3 | 7 | 2 | 2 | 5 | 1 | 3 | 6 | 0 | 1 | 4 | 2 | 2 | 1 | - | 5 | 3 | 57 |
| 9 | Nick Riewoldt | 2 | 2 | 2 | 3 | 3 | 3 | 1 | - | 1 | 1 | 2 | 1 | 3 | 1 | 3 | 6 | 5 | 3 | 2 | 5 | 3 | 4 | 56 |
| 10 | Stephen Milne | 1 | 4 | 2 | 2 | 2 | 0 | 7 | 2 | 2 | 3 | 1 | 1 | - | 4 | 5 | 1 | 2 | 1 | 2 | 3 | 2 | 7 | 54 |

=== Rising Star Nominees ===
The AFL Rising Star award for 2008 was awarded to Rhys Palmer from Fremantle.

=== Club Best and Fairests ===
| Club | Award name | Winner |
|---|---|---|
| Adelaide | Malcolm Blight Medal | Nathan Bock |
| Brisbane Lions | Merrett–Murray Medal | Jonathan Brown |
| Carlton | John Nicholls Medal | Chris Judd |
| Collingwood | Copeland Trophy | Dane Swan |
| Essendon | Crichton Medal | David Hille |
| Fremantle | Doig Medal | Matthew Pavlich |
| Geelong | Carji Greeves Medal | Joel Corey |
| Hawthorn | Peter Crimmins Medal | Lance Franklin |
| Melbourne | Keith 'Bluey' Truscott Medal | Cameron Bruce |
| North Melbourne | Syd Barker Medal | Brent Harvey |
| Port Adelaide | John Cahill Medal | Kane Cornes |
| Richmond | Jack Dyer Medal | Brett Deledio |
| St Kilda | Trevor Barker Award | Sam Fisher |
| Sydney | Bob Skilton Medal | Jarrad McVeigh |
| West Coast | Club Champion Award | Dean Cox |
| Western Bulldogs | Charles Sutton Medal | Daniel Cross |

== Notable events ==
- This was the first season in which Carlton and Richmond faced off in what is now the traditional first clash of the season.
- This was the first season since 1998 in which NMFC competed as "North Melbourne" instead of "Kangaroos", following the end of their decade-long experiment with home-away-from-home venues in Sydney, Canberra and the Gold Coast.
- The Western Bulldogs came back from a 37-point deficit against St Kilda at quarter time to win the game by 38 points, a 75-point turnaround, in round 3.
- The Brisbane Lions produced its biggest ever comeback in round 4 against Port Adelaide when they were down by 47 points late in the third quarter to win by 20 points, a 67-point turnaround.
- Sydney forward Barry Hall was suspended for seven weeks, then the equal-longest suspension handed out since the tribunal was reconfigured to a points-based system in 2005, for striking West Coast defender Brent Staker with a clean punch to the head. Later in the season, Fremantle's Dean Solomon beat that record, being suspended for eight weeks after hitting Geelong's Cameron Ling in the cheekbone with an elbow.
- Melbourne won its first game for the season in round 7 against Fremantle by six points, after recovering from a 50-point half-time deficit, the second-largest half-time deficit ever overcome in VFL/AFL history. This was the second in a VFL/AFL-record string of five consecutive games which Fremantle lost after holding a three-quarter time lead.
- West Coast suffered its worst ever loss at Subiaco Oval, and worst loss anywhere since 1989, in round 13, losing to Geelong by 135 points.
- In round 13, Dustin Fletcher (in his 288th game) and his father, Ken (264 games), claimed the record of most VFL/AFL games played by a father-son combination (552 games).
- In round 16, Richmond player Joel Bowden deliberately conceded two behinds directly from the kick-in, to waste time while protecting his team's four-point lead over Essendon. This was a major motivation for the introduction of a rule from 2009 that allows the umpire to give award free kick for a deliberate rushed behind.
- With its final-round victory, Geelong matched Essendon's 2000 record of 21 wins in a home-and-away season. Ironically, Geelong also set the record for the highest average losing margin in a VFL/AFL season, with its only loss coming by 86 points against Collingwood.
- In the round 22 match between Carlton and Hawthorn, Hawthorn forward Lance Franklin became the first player since Tony Lockett in 1998 to kick 100 goals in the home-and-away Season. Franklin became the 28th player in VFL/AFL history to reach this milestone, and the first indigenous player to do so.
- In the same game, Brendan Fevola scored seven second-half goals to fall one goal short of the same milestone, becoming the first person in VFL/AFL history to finish on 99 goals for a season.
- The final game of the home and away season saw the 8th-placed St Kilda requiring a win of 90+ points over Essendon to claim 4th place going into the finals. St Kilda recorded a then-record winning margin over Essendon of 108 points which saw the Saints replace Adelaide in 4th place for the finals series.
- On Monday 1 September, Leigh Matthews announced his resignation from his senior coaching position at the Brisbane Lions. Michael Voss took up this position despite committing to West Coast for 2009.
- The second elimination final between Sydney and North Melbourne was, at the time, the lowest crowd number for a final outside Victoria with only 19,127 despite being at ANZ Stadium where Sydney had averaged 50,000 for finals.
- The Grand Final between Geelong and Hawthorn drew a crowd of 100,012, the first crowd over 100,000 people since the 1986 Grand Final.
- By losing the Grand Final after finishing with a home-and-away record of 21–1, Geelong broke the record set in 1935 and 1936 by South Melbourne (16–2) for best record by a non-premier, and the record for most wins by a non-premier held jointly by Collingwood (1973) and West Coast (1991) (both 19 wins).
- Sydney played in a controversial draw against North Melbourne at Telstra Dome in round 6; it was later revealed that Sydney had nineteen men on the field for a brief period of play before, during and after the behind that tied the scores was scored. As a direct consequence of this, the league amended the interchange laws in round 9, appointing interchange stewards to police the players and to signal to the field umpires if an infringement has occurred. Any infringement now results in a free kick being awarded.

== Club leadership ==
| Club | Coach | Captain(s) | Vice Captain(s)/Leadership Group |
|---|---|---|---|
| Adelaide | Neil Craig | Simon Goodwin | Nathan Bassett, Brett Burton, Tyson Edwards, Ben Rutten and Nathan van Berlo |
| Brisbane Lions | Leigh Matthews | Simon Black, Jonathan Brown, Nigel Lappin and Luke Power | N/A |
| Carlton | Brett Ratten | Chris Judd | Nick Stevens (vc), Andrew Carrazzo, Heath Scotland and Kade Simpson |
| Collingwood | Mick Malthouse | Scott Burns | Josh Fraser (vc), Tarkyn Lockyer, Nick Maxwell and Scott Pendlebury |
| Essendon | Matthew Knights | Matthew Lloyd | Mark McVeigh and David Hille (vc) |
| Fremantle | Mark Harvey | Matthew Pavlich | Josh Carr (vc) |
| Geelong | Mark Thompson | Tom Harley | Cameron Ling (vc), Cameron Mooney (vc), Joel Corey, Paul Chapman and Max Rooke |
| Hawthorn | Alastair Clarkson | Sam Mitchell | Luke Hodge (vc), Shane Crawford, Chance Bateman and Brad Sewell |
| Melbourne | Dean Bailey | Cameron Bruce and James McDonald | Brock McLean and Brad Miller |
| North Melbourne | Dean Laidley | Adam Simpson | Brady Rawlings, Daniel Harris, Michael Firrito, Nathan Thompson, Drew Petrie, Corey Jones, Daniel Pratt and Brent Harvey |
| Port Adelaide | Mark Williams | Warren Tredrea | Brendon Lade (vc), Chad Cornes (vc), Shaun Burgoyne (vc), Michael Wilson, Kane Cornes and Dom Cassisi |
| Richmond | Terry Wallace | Kane Johnson | Chris Newman (vc), Nathan Foley (vc), Nathan Brown, Troy Simmonds, Joel Bowden and Kayne Pettifer |
| St Kilda | Ross Lyon | Nick Riewoldt | Lenny Hayes |
| Sydney | Paul Roos | Leo Barry, Craig Bolton and Brett Kirk | N/A |
| West Coast | John Worsfold | Darren Glass | Dean Cox (vc), Tyson Stenglein (vc), Matt Priddis, Ashley Hansen and Adam Selwood |
| Western Bulldogs | Rodney Eade | Brad Johnson | Scott West, Robert Murphy, Daniel Cross, Daniel Giansiracusa, Matthew Boyd and Dale Morris |

== Umpires ==
The AFL introduced an additional two boundary umpires in round 21 in order to reduce the error rate and enable the umpires to keep up with the play.

Brett Rosebury was appointed the 2008 All-Australian umpire, the first West Australian umpire to receive that honour. Controversially, however, he was not appointed to umpire the AFL Grand Final, with Scott McLaren, Michael Vozzo and Shaun Ryan selected ahead of Rosebury.

Scott McLaren umpired his 300th game, and Shane McInerney umpired his 250-game, in round 4. Experienced field umpires Martin Ellis and Matthew Head both announced their retirements during the year.

== Coach changes ==
- Surprising some, Leigh Matthews announced his retirement as coach of the Brisbane Lions two days after their final game of the season in what was replaced as a move to make way for potential coaching candidate Michael Voss.
- Despite being newly signed for two years as assistant coach of West Coast, as expected, former Brisbane Lions captain Michael Voss was appointed as coach of the Brisbane Lions, one day after Leigh Matthews resigned.

== See also ==
- 2008 Australian football code crowds
