= 2012 Melbourne Football Club season =

Melbourne Football Club
2012 season
- President: Jim Stynes^{(to 2 February)} Don McLardy^{(from 3 February)}
- Coach: Mark Neeld^{(1st season)}
- Captains: Jack Grimes^{(1st season)} Jack Trengove^{(1st season)}
- Home grounds: MCG^{(100,018 capacity)}
- Pre-season: 14th
- AFL season: 16th
- Finals series: DNQ
- Best and fairest: Nathan Jones
- Leading goalkicker: Mitch Clark^{(29 goals)}
- Highest home attendance: 64,250^{(round 11 vs. Collingwood)}
- Lowest home attendance: 6,714^{(round 17 vs. Port Adelaide)}
- Average home attendance: 28,726
- Club membership: 35,345^{(▼1,592 / ▼4.31%)}

The 2012 Melbourne Football Club season was the club's 113th year in the VFL/AFL since it began in 1897.

After a horrid ending to 2011 which saw coach Dean Bailey sacked after an embarrassing 186-point loss to Geelong in Round 19, former Collingwood midfield assistant coach Mark Neeld was appointed as head coach for 2012 and vowed that he would make Melbourne 'the hardest team to play against in the AFL'. in February 2012, Neeld gave the football club's leadership group a major overhaul by replacing Brad Green as the club's captain with Jack Grimes and Jack Trengove, both of whom are young midfielders. On 2 February, Don McLardy was elected the club's new president, replacing Jim Stynes who was continuing his fight against cancer. Melbourne hosted nine of its eleven games at the Melbourne Cricket Ground, as well as one game against Fremantle at Etihad Stadium in Round 16 and one sold home-game against Port Adelaide at TIO Stadium in Round 17.

The Melbourne Football Club and its supporters will remember 2012 as being one of the worst seasons in the club's 154-year history. Headlined by the death of club-legend Jim Stynes just before the beginning of the season proper, Melbourne would produce one of its most disastrous seasons as they struggled to adapt to the fitness requirements of Mark Neeld's highly contested game plan implemented. The Demons would win only four games and finish the year in 16th place only above the two expansion teams, Gold Coast and Greater Western Sydney, on the ladder. After losing their first nine games of the season, Melbourne would upset second-placed Essendon, who had only lost one game at that stage of the season by a point in Round 10, by six points; their only other wins for the year would come against Greater Western Sydney (twice) and Gold Coast.

== 2012 list changes ==
=== 2011 trades ===
Trade gained	Traded from	Trade lost
Mitch Clark	Brisbane Lions	Pick 12
Pick 52	Gold Coast	Matthew Warnock

=== Retirements and delistings ===
Player	New club	League	Reason
Addam Maric	Richmond	AFL	Delisted
Robert Campbell	Unknown	Unknown	Retired
Cameron Johnston	Unknown	Unknown	Delisted
Tom McNamara	South Adelaide	SANFL	Delisted
Austin Wonaeamirri	NT Thunder	NEAFL	Delisted
Michael Newton	Norwood	SANFL	Delisted

=== National draft ===
Round	Overall pick	Player	State	Position	Team from	League from
2	36	Rory Taggert	(Victoria (state))	Midfield	North Ballarat Rebels	TAC Cup
3	52	Josh Tynan	(Victoria (state))	Defender	Gippsland Power	TAC Cup
3	54	James Sellar	(South Australia)	Utility	Adelaide	AFL

=== Rookie draft ===
Round	Overall pick	Player	State	Position	Team from	League from
1	6	Jai Sheahan	(Victoria (state))	Forward	Geelong Falcons	TAC Cup
2	19	Tom Couch	(Victoria (state))	Midfield	Collingwood	VFL
3	42	James Magner	(Victoria (state))	Midfield	Sandringham	VFL
4	59	Leigh Williams	(Victoria (state))	Forward	Norwood	EFL

== 2012 squad ==
Melbourne Football Club
Senior list		Rookie list	Coaching staff
2 Nathan Jones; 3 Clint Bartram; 4 Jack Watts; 5 Jordan Gysberts; 6 Matthew Bate; 7 Jamie Bennell; 8 James Frawley; 9 Jack Trengove (c); 10 Cale Morton; 11 Mitch Clark; 12 Colin Sylvia; 13 Jordie McKenzie; 14 Lynden Dunn; 15 Ricky Petterd; 16 Jack Grimes (c); 17 Sam Blease; 18 Brad Green; 19 James Strauss; 20 Colin Garland	21 Lucas Cook; 22 Brent Moloney; 24 Liam Jurrah; 25 Tom McDonald; 30 James Sellar; 34 Stefan Martin; 35 Luke Tapscott; 36 Aaron Davey; 37 Max Gawn; 38 Jeremy Howe; 39 Neville Jetta; 40 Mark Jamar; 41 Troy Davis; 42 Jake Spencer; 43 Rory Taggert; 44 Rohan Bail; 46 Josh Tynan; 48 Jack Fitzpatrick	26 Daniel Nicholson; 32 Michael Evans; 45 Kelvin Lawrence; 47 Tom Couch; 49 James Magner; 50 Jai Sheahan; 51 Leigh Williams	Head coach: Mark Neeld; Assistant coaches: Neil Craig (director of coaching); Todd Viney (general manager); Leigh Brown (forward line); Brian Royal (midfield); Jade Rawlings (backline); David Misson (fitness); Legend: (c) Captain(s); (vc) Vice-captain(s); Long-term injury list; Upgraded rookie(s); (vet) Veterans list; Updated: 14 July 2012; Source(s): 2012 playing list, Coaching staff

== 2012 season ==
=== Pre-season ===
==== NAB Cup ====
===== Week 1 =====
	Round 1
Saturday, 25 February (6:10 pm)	Gold Coast 0.4.2 (26)	def.	Melbourne 0.3.5 (23)	Metricon Stadium	Report
Saturday, 25 February (7:15 pm)	Melbourne 0.2.1 (13)	def.	Brisbane Lions 0.1.4 (10)	Metricon Stadium	Report
In the first game, Mitch Clark opened Melbourne's pre-season campaign with a successful shot at goal. Soon after Nathan Jones's goal would extend Melbourne's lead with signs of Melbourne running away with the game. However Gold Coast would steady the game and level it up 0.2.2 a piece at half time. In the second half Nathan Bock and Gary Ablett would raise the intensity in the midfield to help take the lead away from a wasteful Melbourne in the dying stages of the game.; In the second game, a fresh Brisbane Lions would dominate in the midfield and keep Melbourne scoreless in the first-half. However they would not get the scoreboard to reflect their efforts only kicking one goal up until half-time. Melbourne would capitalise on the Brisbane Lions's low inside 50 success rate with goals to Colin Sylvia and James Sellar to take away the lead. Melbourne would almost lose the game in the dying 30 seconds when Brisbane got the ball to move from coast to coast and into empty forward 50 space. James Polkinghorne under pressure would grab the ball and shoot along the ground from 15 metres out on an angle, however the ball would bounce past the goals and go through for a behind to end the game.

===== Week 2 =====
Round 2
Saturday, 3 March (7:30 pm)	Collingwood	def. by	Melbourne	Etihad Stadium (crowd: 12,954)
0.2.3 (15); 0.4.4 (28); 1.6.5 (50); 1.9.7 (70)	Q1; Q2; Q3; Final	0.2.6 (18); 0.3.9 (28); 0.7.11 (53); 0.11.13 (79)	Umpires: Stevic, Armstrong, Kronk; Television broadcast: Fox Footy
Shaw	Super Goals
Thomas 2, Rounds 2, Cloke, Maxwell, Paine, Ceglar, Morton, Ball	Goals	Petterd 2, Martin 2, Jones 2, Dunn 2, Howe, Green, Sylvia
Pendlebury, Thomas, Shaw, Yagmoor, Reid	Best	Garland, Petterd, Magner, Jones, Sellar, Green
Melbourne won their second game of the NAB Cup with a surprise victory against the 2011 NAB Cup premiers Collingwood as Mark Neeld won his first ever encounter against his old club.; Throughout the match Melbourne would do much of the attacking in the midfield, but would be unable to convert on the scoreboard up until half time.; Melbourne would take control of the game despite a late onslaught by Collingwood in the third quarter and eventually run away with the game in the fourth quarter.; Collingwood would kick the last couple of goals during time-on as Melbourne would be victourious by 9 points.; Despite only being a pre-season game, this was Melbourne's first victory against Collingwood since Round 11, 2007 and their first victory at Etihad Stadium since Round 19, 2007.

===== Week 3 =====
Round 3
Saturday, 10 March (5:40 pm)	Melbourne	def. by	Hawthorn	Etihad Stadium (crowd: 10,611)
0.2.3 (15); 0.4.6 (30); 0.4.7 (31); 0.6.8 (44)	Q1; Q2; Q3; Final	0.6.2 (38); 0.10.4 (64); 1.12.8 (89); 1.17.12 (123)	Umpires: Orr, Harris, McInerney; Television broadcast: Fox Footy
Super Goals	Franklin
Clark 3, Watts 2, Dunn	Goals	Hale 6, Franklin 5, Breust 2, Sewell, Hodge, Lewis, Bruce
Clark, Jones, Dunn, Howe	Best	Franklin, Hale, Hodge, Suckling, Whitecross, Bateman
Magner (finger)	Injuries
From the start of the game, Melbourne would be utterly decimated in the midfield and would be unable to have any real impact against Hawthorn.; Lance Franklin and David Hale would put on a show for Hawthorn fans kicking 12 goals between them which included one super-goal from Franklin.

==== NAB Challenge ====
===== Week 4 =====
Week 4
Friday, 16 March (7:10 pm)	Port Adelaide	def.	Melbourne	AAMI Stadium (crowd: 2500 est)
6.3 (39); 8.7 (55); 13.7 (85); 17.10 (112)	Q1; Q2; Q3; Final	2.1 (13); 4.4 (28); 7.8 (50); 9.10 (64)	Umpires: Kronk; Television broadcast: none
Schultz 3, Broadbent 2, Ebert 2, Pfeiffer 2, Young 2, Gray, Logan, McCarthy, Stewart, Thomas, Jonas	Goals	Clark 3, Jones 2, Blease 2, Petterd, Davey
Pearce, Ebert, Cornes, Gray, Boak, Broadbent	Best	Jamar, Jones, Davey, Frawley, Moloney, Rivers
Trengove (finger)	Injuries	Howe (cut head), Sylvia (back)
Butcher (rough conduct)	Reports	Rivers (wrestling), McDonald (wrestling)

=== Home and away season ===
==== Round 1 ====
Round 1
Saturday, 31 March (1:45 pm)	Melbourne	def. by	Brisbane Lions	MCG (crowd: 33,473)
3.3 (21); 7.4 (46); 8.8 (56); 11.12 (78)	Q1; Q2; Q3; Final	1.4 (10); 7.8 (50); 13.13 (91); 17.17 (119)	Umpires: Dalgleish, Leppard, Grun; Television broadcast: Fox Footy
Magner 2, Howe 2, Clark 2, Martin, Watts, Trengove, Green, Davey	Goals	Rockliff 3, Banfield 3, Polkinghorne 3, Hanley 2, Merrett 2, Leuenberger, Adcock, McGrath, Sheldon
Magner, Trengove, Watts, Frawley	Best	Black, Rich, Hanley, Rockliff, Adcock, McGrath
Magner (wrist)	Injuries
About a fortnight before the game, former club-president and club-champion Jim Stynes died of cancer.; Directly before the National Anthem was performed, one minute of applause was dedicated to Jim Stynes for all his contributions to the Melbourne Football Club and the greater community.; Despite an emotional Melbourne heading in as favourites, they were comprehensively beaten by the Brisbane Lions due to Brisbane's ability to move the ball out of stoppages and towards free targets.; Brisbane Lions's win over Melbourne was their first at the MCG since Round 21, 1999.; Debut(s): James Magner, Josh Tynan; Brownlow Votes: 1. Niall McKeever (Brisbane Lions), 2. James Magner (Melbourne), 3. Simon Black (Brisbane Lions); Ladder Position: 14th Substitutes: Matthew Bate ▲ Sam Blease ▼

==== Round 2 ====
Round 2
Saturday, 7 April (2:40 pm)	West Coast	def.	Melbourne	Patersons Stadium (crowd: 35,674)
4.3 (27); 11.8 (74); 19.14 (128); 25.16 (166)	Q1; Q2; Q3; Final	1.0 (6); 4.2 (26); 6.2 (38); 9.4 (58)	Umpires: Farmer, Fila, Leppard; Television broadcast: Fox Footy
Darling 4, Lynch 4, Selwood 3, Hams 3, Hill 3, Waters 2, Kerr, Naitanui, Shuey, Kennedy, Selwood, Gaff	Goals	Clark 5, Jones 2, Dunn 2
Selwood, Priddis, Shuey, Darling, Waters, Glass, Lynch, Hurn	Best	Magner, Clark, Frawley, Jones, Rivers, McDonald
Embley (Shoulder)	Injuries	Martin (hip) replaced in selected-side by McDonald
Melbourne headed into the match without a major sponsor after their CEO Cameron Schwab cut ties with Energywatch due to its CEO Ben Polis' controversial remarks on Facebook.; Melbourne ended a nightmare week with a 108-point destruction in the hands of West Coast who would dominate the free-kick count 32-12 and the tackle count 69-41 despite controlling much of the ball possession throughout the game.; This would be Melbourne's largest ever loss at Patersons Stadium and also their largest ever loss against West Coast.; Brownlow Votes: 1. Luke Shuey (West Coast), 2. Scott Selwood (West Coast), 3. Matt Priddis (West Coast); Ladder Position: 16th Substitutes: Matthew Bate ▲ Jamie Bennell ▼

==== Round 3 ====
Round 3
Saturday, 14 April (1:45 pm)	Richmond	def.	Melbourne	MCG (crowd: 49,826)
4.4 (28); 6.8 (44); 15.11 (101); 20.13 (133)	Q1; Q2; Q3; Final	2.3 (15); 5.6 (36); 6.6 (42); 11.8 (74)	Umpires: Schmitt, Armstrong, Mitchell; Television broadcast: Seven Network
Miller 3, Cotchin 3, Deledio 2, Conca 2, Nahas 2, Houli, Jackson, Martin, Maric, Riewoldt, Grigg, Tuck, Vickery	Goals	Howe 2, Trengove 2, Dunn 2, Clark 2, Sellar, Watts, Jones
Grigg, Tuck, Nahas, Conca, Houli, Cotchin, Foley, Deledio	Best	Howe, Frawley, Jones, Watts, McKenzie
Injuries	Grimes (concussion)
It was announced earlier in the week that Webjet would sign on as one of two major sponsors after Melbourne cut ties with Energywatch the week before.; Despite playing a competitive first half, Richmond would kick 9 goals to 1 in the third quarter to put the game beyond doubt for Melbourne.; Melbourne's 3rd consecutive huge loss would ensure that they would fall below 16th spot for the first time in the club's history.; Brownlow Votes: 1. Shane Tuck (Richmond), 2. Nathan Foley (Richmond), 3. Shaun Grigg (Richmond); Ladder Position: 17th Substitutes: Lynden Dunn ▲ Stefan Martin ▼

==== Round 4 ====
Round 4
Sunday, 22 April (4:40 pm)	Melbourne	def. by	Western Bulldogs	MCG (crowd: 33,565)
1.5 (11); 3.8 (26); 7.10 (52); 9.13 (67)	Q1; Q2; Q3; Final	3.2 (20); 6.5 (41); 10.7 (67); 13.10 (88)	Umpires: Wenn, Armstrong, Bannister; Television broadcast: Fox Footy
Bate 2, Davey 2, Clark, Bail, Watts, Moloney, Morton	Goals	Cooney 2, Grant 2, Giansiracusa 2, Griffen, Dahlhaus, Sherman, Jones, Djerrkura, Roughead, Wallis
Magner, Bate, Jones, Rivers, Howe	Best	Cross, Murphy, Dahlhaus, Cooney, Djerrkura
Clark (neck)	Injuries	Markovic (hamstring) replaced in selected-side by Austin
This match was designated to be the Jim Stynes Tribute Game, in which a Jim Stynes Tribute Hour was held before the start of the game.; The Jim Stynes Tribute Hour featured tribute videos, speeches and appearances from The Reach Foundation, former teammates Garry Lyon and Russell Robertson, Jim Stynes' family as well as Prime Minister Julia Gillard.; David Bridie lead singer of the band My Friend The Chocolate Cake would perform a musical act in the tribute hour which included songs "Jimmy Stynes" and "Danny Boy".; Melbourne would wear a special jumper with a green shamrock clover present in the middle of the jumper with the Jim Stynes number 11 on it.; Prior to the game it was also announced that Opel had signed on as Melbourne's second major sponsor.; In cold and rainy conditions where both teams were yet to register a win for the season, Melbourne would be wasteful of their opportunities as Western Bulldogs would capitalize more of their chances up until half time.; Despite a Melbourne fightback which would bring them within 1 point midway through the third quarter, Western Bulldogs would re-extend their margin and win comfortable 21-point winners.; Brownlow Votes: 1. Matthew Bate (Melbourne), 2. Luke Dahlhaus (Western Bulldogs), 3. Adam Cooney (Western Bulldogs); Ladder Position: 16th Substitutes: Luke Tapscott ▲ Mitch Clark ▼

==== Round 5 ====
Round 5
Saturday, 28 April (7:40 pm)	Melbourne	def. by	St Kilda	MCG (crowd: 24,798)
4.1 (25); 8.3 (51); 10.6 (66); 10.6 (66)	Q1; Q2; Q3; Final	5.4 (34); 8.6 (53); 10.9 (69); 12.12 (84)	Umpires: Pannell, Mitchell, Mollison; Television broadcast: Seven Network
Jones 2, Bail 2, Moloney, Bate, Watts, Davey, Dunn, Bartram	Goals	Wilkes 3, Milne 2, Steven 2, Riewoldt 2, Stanley, Montagna, Hayes
Jamar, Jones, Rivers, McKenzie, McDonald, Grimes, Magner	Best	Hayes, Fisher, Dal Santo, Milera, Wilkes, Armitage
Frawley (calf) replaced in selected-side by Tapscott	Injuries
Thanks to a midfield onslaught led by Nathan Jones, Melbourne looked like picking up their first win of the season. However a much more experienced St Kilda outfit was able to keep Melbourne scoreless in the final quarter and run away 18-point winners within the last 10 minutes of the game.; Milestone(s): Clint Bartram (100th AFL game); Brownlow Votes: 1. David Armitage (St Kilda), 2. Nathan Jones (Melbourne), 3. Nick Dal Santo (St Kilda); Ladder Position: 16th Substitutes: Colin Sylvia ▲ Lynden Dunn ▼

==== Round 6 ====
Round 6
Saturday, 5 May (1:45 pm)	Geelong	def.	Melbourne	Simonds Stadium (crowd: 18,018)
3.5 (23); 9.11 (65); 15.14 (104); 17.17 (119)	Q1; Q2; Q3; Final	3.0 (18); 6.1 (37); 10.5 (65); 11.10 (76)	Umpires: Fleer, Wenn, Bannister; Television broadcast: Seven Network
Chapman 3, Podsiadly 3, Johnson 3, Bartel 2, Mackie 2, Stringer, Kelly, Hawkins, Motlop	Goals	Clark 4, Jones 2, Bate 2, Davey, Dunn, Howe
Johnson, Corey, Chapman, Duncan, Motlop, Podsiadly, Enright, Taylor	Best	Clark, Frawley, Jones, Jamar
Selwood (concussion) and Lonergan (soreness) replaced in side by Gillies and Byrnes, Bartel (ankle)	Injuries
Despite losing to Geelong by 186 points 9 months before, Melbourne would put on a much more competitive display against an essentially rebuilding Geelong side.; Melbourne would get within 2 goals midway through the third quarter, but would fade out and eventually fall by 43 points.; Brownlow Votes: 1. Steven Motlop (Geelong), 2. Joel Corey (Geelong), 3. Steve Johnson (Geelong); Ladder Position: 17th Substitutes: Lynden Dunn ▲ Luke Tapscott ▼

==== Round 7 ====
Round 7
Friday, 11 May (7:50 pm)	Melbourne	def. by	Hawthorn	MCG (crowd: 36,430)
3.3 (21); 3.5 (23); 5.11 (41); 6.13 (49)	Q1; Q2; Q3; Final	2.6 (18); 8.12 (60); 10.18 (78); 15.25 (115)	Umpires: Rosebury, Findlay, Bannister; Television broadcast: Seven Network
Clark 3, Howe, McKenzie, Magner	Goals	Franklin 3, Puopolo 2, Farmer 2, Breust, Hale, Rioli, Roughead, Savage, Smith, Lewis, Suckling
Clark, Grimes, McKenzie, Bartram	Best	Shiels, Birchall, Sewell, Hale, Whitecross, Roughead
Injuries	Osborne (knee)
Playing their only Friday night game of the year in cold and wet conditions, Melbourne's midfield would be dominated by that of Hawthorn's whom dominated the inside 50 count 64-36 as well as the clearance count 40-22. The margin was only won by 66 points due to Hawthorn's inaccurate shots on goals.; Melbourne would finish the round at the bottom of the ladder for the first time since Round 1, 2010.; Brownlow Votes: 1. Lance Franklin (Hawthorn), 2. Matt Suckling (Hawthorn), 3. Brad Sewell (Hawthorn); Ladder Position: 18th Substitutes: Matthew Bate ▲ Jack Fitzpatrick ▼

==== Round 8 ====
Round 8
Saturday, 19 May (4:40 pm)	Sydney	def.	Melbourne	SCG (crowd: 20,818)
7.1 (43); 11.4 (70); 16.9 (105); 21.12 (138)	Q1; Q2; Q3; Final	0.3 (3); 1.5 (11); 2.7 (19); 5.7 (37)	Umpires: Nicholls, Hosking, Kamolins; Television broadcast: Fox Footy
Kennedy 3, Jack 3, Parker 3, Jetta 3, Dennis-Lane 2, Walsh 2, McGlynn 2, O'Keefe, Reid, Mattner	Goals	Jones 2, Bennell, Sylvia, Green
Jack, Jetta, Parker, O'Keefe, Mattner, Grundy, Walsh	Best	Watts, Jones, Howe
Injuries	Rivers, Jurrah (ankle, wrist), Jones (sore)
Sydney celebrated their 30th anniversary of relocation from South Melbourne in this match by wearing a special red-vee jumper with all the names of the players whom have played for Sydney since 1982.; Liam Jurrah would play his first and only match of the season after facing Alice Springs Magistrates Court for the first part of the season.; Rainy SCG conditions proved to be a nightmare for Melbourne's relatively inexperienced forwards and midfielders against Sydney's matured and large bodied key match-ups. In a scrappy game with plenty of stoppages, Melbourne would get slaughtered by 101 points.; Jack Watts would by far receive Melbourne's greatest number of disposals for the match earning 34 as he played as a loose player in the half-back line. This would ultimately result in him playing out the rest of the season as a defender.; This loss would be Melbourne's second-ever worst loss at the SCG and their third-ever worst against Sydney.; Despite the magnitude of the loss, Jeremy Howe would win the Mark of the Year in this game by taking a wayward mark over Heath Grundy midway through the third quarter.; Brownlow Votes: 1. Dan Hannebery (Sydney), 2. Ryan O'Keefe (Sydney), 3. Kieren Jack (Sydney); Ladder Position: 18th Substitutes: Jamie Bennell ▲ Cale Morton ▼

==== Round 9 ====
Round 9
Sunday, 27 May (3:15 pm)	Carlton	def.	Melbourne	MCG (crowd: 28,371)
3.3 (21); 7.8 (50); 8.14 (62); 15.17 (107)	Q1; Q2; Q3; Final	3.4 (22); 5.7 (37); 6.10 (46); 6.13 (49)	Umpires: Nicholls, Ryan, Fleer; Television broadcast: Seven Network
Betts 5, Robinson 3, Hampson 2, Walker 2, Armfield, Kreuzer, Tuohy	Goals	Clark 3, Blease, Howe, Jones
Robinson, Simpson, Gibbs, Jaminson, Walker, McLean	Best	Grimes, McKenzie, Watts, McDonald, Rivers
Henderson (groin) and Yarran (toe) replaced by Lucas and Bower, Collins (knee)	Injuries	Bartram (knee) replaced in the side by Tapscott, Green (lung)
In another wet day in Melbourne, the Demons would run rampant over Carlton in the first quarter by holding a 14-point lead late in the first quarter. However Carlton would wrestle back control of the match and eventually snatch the lead early in the second quarter.; Up until 3 quarter time Melbourne would be right in this match by inhibiting Chris Judd's involvement in the match and managed to only trail by 16 points at the final break.; Despite the hard efforts of Melbourne, Carlton would blow the match away and manage to kick 7 goals to none in the final quarter and ensured Melbourne would receive their 4th consecutive 40-plus-point loss.; Melbourne's 0-9 start to the year was their second since Round 9, 2007.; Brownlow Votes: 1. Andrew Walker (Carlton), 2. David Ellard (Carlton), 3. Mitch Robinson (Carlton); Ladder Position: 18th Substitutes: Jamie Bennell ▲ Brad Green ▼

==== Round 10 ====
Round 10
Saturday, 2 June (7:40 pm)	Essendon	def. by	Melbourne	MCG (crowd: 42,987)
1.5 (11); 2.9 (21); 5.13 (43); 6.16 (52)	Q1; Q2; Q3; Final	1.2 (8); 4.3 (27); 5.5 (35); 8.10 (58)	Umpires: McBurney, Jennings, Foot; Television broadcast: Seven Network
Watson 2, Davey, Melksham, Hocking, Colyer	Goals	Garland 2, Howe, Morton, Moloney, Jones, Clark, Sylvia
Watson, Dempsey, Stanton, Howlett, Zaharakis	Best	Watts, Jones, Howe, Moloney, Rivers, Grimes, Nicholson
Hooker (soreness) replaced in selected side by Pears	Injuries	Bail (concussion) replaced in selected side by Morton, Blease (groin)
Despite winning their last two encounters at the MCG, Melbourne would head into the game as major under-dogs against second placed Essendon.; Melbourne would play their 4th consecutive week of wet-weather football.; Essendon got off to a quick start in the first quarter with a quick pick up and goal by Jobe Watson 20 metres out. However were wasteful heading inside 50 and Melbourne took the lead midway through the first quarter with a running kick at goal from Jeremy Howe.; In a low scoring struggle from both sides Melbourne would finally break the ice with a shot at goal from Cale Morton, a running shot and bounce through goal by Brent Moloney outside 50 and a right-footed banana shot from Nathan Jones to get the Demons out to a 13-point lead. It was not until the final minutes of the half when Alwyn Davey would soccer a shot from within the goal square through to close the lead to 6 points.; Essendon as expected would come out with a lifted intensity and kicked 3 consecutive goals in the third quarter to extend the lead to 15 points. Towards the end of the quarter Mitch Clark would earn a free shot at goal and converted to bring Melbourne back within 8 points as well as break Essendon's momentum.; After a successful right-angled kick at goal from Colin Garland as well as a controversially denied goal by Daniel Nicholson in the final quarter, Colin Garland would be the unlikely hero by kicking 2 consecutive goals that would earn Melbourne a 13-point lead.; In the final ten minutes Jobe Watson would snap-kick a running goal from near the boundary to bring the margin back to 5 points. However due to hard-ball wins from Nathan Jones, Jack Watts, Jack Grimes and Daniel Nicholson as well as a wayward shot at goal that resulted in a behind from Colin Garland, Melbourne would finish by producing one of the biggest upsets of the season.; Melbourne's upset win would be their 80th ever win against Essendon in VFL/AFL history, and ranked first among the Herald Sun's top ten surprises of the 2012 season.; Brownlow Votes: 1. Daniel Nicholson (Melbourne), 2. Jobe Watson (Essendon), 3. Jack Watts (Melbourne); Ladder Position: 16th Substitutes: Sam Blease ▲ Lynden Dunn ▼

==== Round 11 ====
Round 11
Monday, 11 June (3:15 pm)	Melbourne	def. by	Collingwood	MCG (crowd: 64,250)
0.4 (4); 3.4 (22); 7.7 (49); 13.9 (87)	Q1; Q2; Q3; Final	6.3 (39); 8.9 (57); 10.15 (75); 19.15 (129)	Umpires: Nicholls, Bannister, Stevic; Television broadcast: Seven Network
Clark 4, Howe 2, Dunn 2, Magner, Sylvia, Rivers, Trengove, Blease	Goals	Sinclair 3, Wellingham 2, Goldsack 2, Cloke 2, Fasolo 2, Blair 2, Swan 2, Jolly 2, Sidebottom, Beams
Clark, Jones, Howe, Grimes, Watts, McKenzie	Best	Swan, Beams, Sidebottom, Blair, Wellingham, Sinclair, Goldsack, Fasolo
Green (groin), Sylvia (suspected broken nose)	Injuries	Didak (groin)
Mark Neeld's first official encounter against his old club would go down as a comprehensive loss as Collingwood would prove to be too-strong against Melbourne's midfielders with their new use of the corridor under Nathan Buckley.; After Collingwood kicked the first 8 consecutive goals of the match, Melbourne started a mini-comeback in the late second and third quarters kicking 6 of the next 7 goals to close the margin to within 24 points.; Collingwood would end Melbourne's comeback by kicking the next 4 goals and equalizing the final 6 goals Melbourne kicked for the match in a high-scoring last quarter.; Brownlow Votes: 1. Steele Sidebottom (Collingwood), 2. Dayne Beams (Collingwood), 3. Dane Swan (Collingwood); Ladder Position: 16th Substitutes: Lynden Dunn ▲ Brad Green ▼

==== Round 12 ====
Round 12
Bye; Melbourne

==== Round 13 ====
Round 13
Sunday, 24 June (3:15 pm)	Melbourne	def.	Greater Western Sydney	MCG (crowd: 20,070)
6.1 (37); 11.4 (70); 18.8 (116); 20.15 (135)	Q1; Q2; Q3; Final	5.1 (31); 6.2 (38); 6.2 (38); 9.3 (57)	Umpires: McBurney, Ryan, Hay; Television broadcast: Seven Network
Clark 4, Rivers 4, Garland 3, Sylvia 2, Davey 2, Howe, Trengove, Jamar, Blease, Bate	Goals	Cameron 3, Wilson 2, Patton, Greene, Adams, Bugg
Jones, Rivers, Clark, Watts, Howe, McDonald, Garland, Jamar	Best	Ward, Greene, Treloar, Davis, Adams, Cameron
Bail (concussion) replaced in selected-side by Blease, Clark (concussion/foot)	Injuries
Melbourne's inaugural clash with Greater Western Sydney, featured ex-Melbourne captain James McDonald and Tom Scully facing their old club and teammates.; Whilst James McDonald received a pleasant reception from the Melbourne supporters, Tom Scully was jeered heavily every time he touched the ball, or was sent off to the interchange bench, due to his decision to leave Melbourne the year before for a 5-million dollar contract at Greater Western Sydney.; Despite conceding the first 2 goals of the game and looking to be challenged by Greater Western Sydney, Melbourne would settle their nerves at the end of the first quarter and build up a lead in the second quarter.; Melbourne's third quarter was their most impressive quarter for the season as they kept Greater Western Sydney scoreless and piled on 7.4. This was the first time that they had kept a team scoreless in a quarter since Round 8, 2006.; Melbourne's last quarter featured inaccurate kicking from set shots as they only added 2 extra goals, but still managed to draw the quarter and let Greater Western Sydney's first ever match at the MCG be a thrashing.; Tom McDonald received the NAB AFL Rising Star nomination for Round 13.; For the first and only time in 2012, Melbourne players would collect all the Brownlow votes in a game.; During the second quarter Mitch Clark (whom at that point had scored 4 goals) had a head-collision to James Magner's knees. It was later revealed he had suffered a Lisfranc injury and would be out for the rest of the season.; Despite Melbourne comfortably scoring goals for the rest of the game, Mitch Clark's injury would leave Melbourne without a key forward as they would struggle to make the most of their chances form inside 50 after this match. For the rest of the season, a number of key-defenders would be rotated to fill Mitch Clark's void including Jared Rivers, Colin Garland and Luke Tapscott.; Milestones: Jack Watts (50th AFL game), Tom McDonald (Rising Star round nominee); Brownlow Votes: 1. Colin Sylvia (Melbourne), 2. Jack Grimes (Melbourne), 3. Nathan Jones (Melbourne); Ladder Position: 16th Substitutes: Sam Blease ▲ Mitch Clark ▼

==== Round 14 ====
Round 14
Sunday, 1 July (3:15 pm)	Brisbane Lions	def.	Melbourne	Gabba (crowd: 22,114)
6.1 (37); 9.6 (60); 13.11 (89); 18.14 (122)	Q1; Q2; Q3; Final	3.6 (24); 3.8 (26); 4.11 (35); 8.13 (61)	Umpires: Kamolins, Jennings, Mollison; Television broadcast: Seven Network
Brown 4, McGrath 3, Hanley 3, Green 2, Zorko, Redden, Polec, Merrett, Black, Bewick	Goals	Blease 2, Bail, Bate, Garland, Howe, McKenzie, Sylvia
Black, Redden, Brown, Harwood, Rockliff, Rich, Hanley	Best	Howe, Sylvia, Martin, Trengove, McKenzie, Nicholson
McGrath (hamstring)	Injuries	Jones (calf) and Jamar (calf) replaced in selected-side by Spencer and Blease, McDonald (internal)
With Mitch Clark injured for the rest of the season as well as Nathan Jones and Mark Jamar acting as late withdrawals, Melbourne lacked key players for their game plan structure.; Melbourne would steady Brisbane Lions' first 3 goals by dominating the forward 50 entrances in the first quarter. However with no versatile forward Melbourne would only score 3 goals before the Brisbane Lions' would run over the top of them for the rest of the match.; Melbourne's low inside 50 conversion rate (8 goals from 54 inside 50s) would break their 2-game winning streak at the Gabba.; Milestones(s): Jack Trengove, Jordie McKenzie (50th AFL game); Brownlow Votes: 1. Tom Rockliff (Brisbane Lions), 2. Pearce Hanley (Brisbane Lions), 3. Brown (Brisbane Lions); Ladder Position: 16th Substitutes: Sam Blease ▲ Tom McDonald ▼

==== Round 15 ====
Round 15
Saturday, 7 July (2:10 pm)	Melbourne	def. by	Richmond	MCG (crowd: 46,773)
1.0 (6); 4.4 (28); 5.6 (36); 11.12 (78)	Q1; Q2; Q3; Final	4.6 (24); 6.12 (48); 9.20 (74); 13.23 (101)	Umpires: Foot, Wenn, Armstrong; Television broadcast: Fox Footy
Martin 2, Garland, Sylvia, Bennell, McKenzie, Rivers, Tapscott, Jones, Bail, Blease	Goals	Nahas 4, Deledio 2, McGuane 2, Riewoldt, White, Edwards, Grigg, Tuck
Jones, Frawley, Sylvia, Bail, Martin, Watts	Best	Grigg, Tuck, Houli, Cotchin, Deledio, Nahas
From the very start of the match, Richmond would dominate possession-use of the ball and despite their inaccurate kicking in the forward line, they would mostly prevent Melbourne from letting the ball escape their forward half throughout the game.; A second and fourth quarter momentum shift saw Melbourne make the most of their inside 50s, however they would never threaten Richmond's lead eventually losing by 23 points.; Milestones(s): Matthew Bate (100th AFL game); Brownlow Votes: 1. Brett Deledio (Richmond), 2. Nathan Jones (Melbourne), 3. Shaun Grigg (Richmond); Ladder Position: 16th Substitutes: Brent Moloney ▲ James Magner ▼

==== Round 16 ====
Round 16
Saturday, 15 July (1:45 pm)	Melbourne	def. by	Fremantle	Etihad Stadium (crowd: 13,284)
6.4 (40); 8.6 (54); 12.7 (79); 12.11 (83)	Q1; Q2; Q3; Final	3.2 (20); 6.5 (41); 11.6 (72); 18.9 (117)	Umpires: Dalgleish, Wenn, Bannister; Television broadcast: Seven Network
Green 3, Martin 2, Bail 2, Blease 2, Bennell, Bate, Sylvia	Goals	Pavlich 4, Walters 3, Ballantyne 2, Barlow 2, Hill 2, Pearce 2, Mzungu, Bradley, Mayne
Sylvia, McDonald, Nicholson, Frawley, Martin, Macdonald	Best	Mundy, Walters, Ballantyne, McPharlin, Hill, Mayne, Pavlich
Tapscott (groin), Jamar (leg), Bennell (knee)	Injuries	Grover
With the Geelong vs Collingwood blockbuster playing at the MCG that night, Melbourne were forced to use Etihad Stadium to host this match. Owing to Melbourne's horrible on-field performance during the season, a very low crowd was expected to turn up and hence the entire level 4 was closed. The crowd of 13,284 was the fourth lowest AFL crowd at Etihad Stadium since it opened in 2000.; Melbourne produced their best first quarter at that point for the season by kicking the first 3 goals of the match and leading by 20 points at quarter time.; Fremantle's increased pressure on Melbourne's midfield in the second quarter ensured a large amount of ball-time spent in their forward half. However they were unable to convert their many forward 50 entrances and would only chip away at the margin until half time.; When Fremantle eventually took the lead away from Melbourne midway through the third quarter, the Demons would gather another burst of momentum and kick the next 4 goals.; After Sam Blease's goal of the year contender from the boundary line 50 metres out, Fremantle would instantly reply and from that point on run over the top of Melbourne by kicking the last 9 goals of the game.; Debut(s): Tom Couch; Brownlow Votes: 1. Stephen Hill (Fremantle), 2. Nathan Jones (Melbourne), 3. David Mundy (Fremantle); Ladder Position: 16th Substitutes: James Strauss ▲ Mark Jamar ▼

==== Round 17 ====
Round 17
Saturday, 21 July (7:10 pm)	Melbourne	def. by	Port Adelaide	TIO Stadium (crowd: 6,714)
5.0 (30); 5.1 (31); 7.5 (47); 8.8 (56)	Q1; Q2; Q3; Final	2.5 (17); 5.10 (40); 8.10 (58); 12.12 (84)	Umpires: Dalgleish, Kamolins, Hosking; Television broadcast: Fox Footy
Green 2, Rivers 2, Martin, Sylvia, Blease, Jones	Goals	P. Stewart 5, D. Stewart, Boak, Brett Ebert, Broadbent, Young, Lobbe, Wingard, Westhoff
Grimes, Green, Trengove, Jones, Nicholson	Best	P. Stewart, Boak, Brad Ebert, Cassisi,
Injuries	Pittard (ribs/lungs), McCarthy (blood nose)
Despite Melbourne's 2-0 record at TIO Stadium, they would come in as underdogs against fellow cellar-dwellers Port Adelaide.; Melbourne whom were preparing for the hot and humid conditions in Darwin for a month beforehand would attack early on for the first quarter. However they would eventually slow down and miss vitally needed opportunities as Port Adelaide would snatch the lead in the second quarter and continue to extend it for the rest of the match.; Brownlow Votes: 1. Jack Grimes (Melbourne), 2. Paul Stewart (Port Adelaide), 3. Travis Boak (Port Adelaide); Ladder Position: 16th Substitutes: James Strauss ▲ James Magner ▼

==== Round 18 ====
Round 18
Saturday, 28 July (2:10 pm)	North Melbourne	def.	Melbourne	Etihad Stadium (crowd: 20,816)
5.4 (34); 9.6 (60); 15.10 (100); 19.13 (127)	Q1; Q2; Q3; Final	1.2 (8); 5.5 (35); 7.5 (47); 11.7 (73)	Umpires: McBurney, Armstrong, Harris; Television broadcast: Fox Footy
Petrie 4, Tarrant 4, Adams 2, Thomas 2, Harvey 2, Bastinac, Macmillan, Anthony, Swallow, Harper	Goals	Green 3, Sylvia 3, Blease, Howe, Garland, Martin, Jones
Harvey, Gibson, Wells, Cunnington, Swallow, Goldstein, Atley	Best	Jones, Green, Moloney, Howe, Macdonald
Adams (shoulder), McMahon (soreness)	Injuries
Brad Green would become the 8th Melbourne footballer to reach 250 games.; After North Melbourne kicked the first 5 goals of the match, the game would be too far out of reach for Melbourne to make a comeback.; Nathan Jones' attempt of lifting Melbourne back in the game would minimize the deficit, however it wouldn't make it a memorable game for Brad Green as they lost their 12th consecutive match against North Melbourne.; Milestone(s): Brad Green (250th AFL game); Brownlow Votes: 1. Nathan Jones (Melbourne), 2. Todd Goldstein (North Melbourne), 3. Andrew Swallow (North Melbourne); Ladder Position: 16th Substitutes: James Strauss ▲ Neville Jetta ▼

==== Round 19 ====
Round 19
Sunday, 5 August (1:10 pm)	Melbourne	def.	Gold Coast	MCG (crowd: 18,097)
6.6 (42); 10.7 (67); 13.8 (86); 16.12 (108)	Q1; Q2; Q3; Final	0.2 (2); 4.5 (29); 5.9 (39); 9.12 (66)	Umpires: H. Ryan, B. Ryan, Schmitt; Television broadcast: Fox Footy
Green 5, Sylvia 2, Blease 2, Spencer, Trengove, Tapscott, Sellar, Rivers, Bail, Howe	Goals	Bennell 4, Ablett, Rischitelli, Brennan, Russell, Lynch
Sylvia, Jones, Trengove, McDonald, Grimes, Green, Dunn, Howe	Best	Bennell, Ablett, Shaw, Swallow, Patrick
McKenzie (knee), Morton (shoulder)	Injuries	Stanley, Prestia (ankle), Smith (ankle), Hunt (shoulder), Russell (shoulder)
Melbourne recorded its best first quarter of the season and the 13th largest first quarter margin in its club's VFL/AFL history.; After Melbourne scored its first goal of the second quarter, it looked like they would thrash Gold Coast. However they would slow down and allow Gold Coast to compete for the rest of the match in a game filled with skill errors and injuries from both sides.; To end the lack-lustre game, Jeremy Howe would take a leaping grab over teammate Rohan Bail and Campbell Brown in the forward 50 and kick a goal after the siren and extend Melbourne's final margin over 40 points.; A Kick On The 'G was permitted after the game due to the expected low attendance at the game.; Brownlow Votes: 1. Gary Ablett (Gold Coast), 2. Nathan Jones (Melbourne), 3. Harley Bennell (Gold Coast); Ladder Position: 16th Substitutes: James Magner ▲ Cale Morton ▼

==== Round 20 ====
Round 20
Saturday, 11 August (1:45 pm)	St Kilda	def.	Melbourne	MCG (crowd: 23,464)
4.2 (26); 5.5 (35); 12.11 (83); 16.11 (107)	Q1; Q2; Q3; Final	0.3 (3); 2.7 (19); 4.9 (33); 12.10 (82)	Umpires: Kamolins, Hosking, Stewart; Television broadcast: Seven Network
Wilkes 5, Milne 2, Koschitzke 2, Cripps 2, Saad 2, Riewoldt, Steven, Goddard	Goals	Blease 5, Sellar 2, Howe, Dunn, Jetta, Green, Sylvia
Wilkes, Dal Santo, Armitage, Dempster, Hayes, Montagna, Geary	Best	Blease, Jones, Grimes, Rivers, Macdonald
Ray (back), Jones, Riewoldt	Injuries	Frawley (quad)
Melbourne's scoreless first quarter seemed to indicate that they were in for another bad match. However they began to dominate more of the ball towards the end of the first quarter, slowly chipping back at St Kilda's margin in the second quarter.; After Melbourne got within 5 points of St Kilda early within the third quarter, St Kilda would increase their midfield drive and blow the margin out to 50 points.; With the game out of reach in the fourth quarter, Melbourne emulated the attacking nature of St Kilda in the third quarter to score their highest score in a quarter for the season (8.1.49) and cut the three quarter time deficit in half by the end of the match.; Milestone(s): Jack Grimes (50th AFL game), Sam Blease (Rising Star round nominee); Brownlow Votes: 1. Sam Blease (Melbourne), 2. Nick Dal Santo (St Kilda), 3. Beau Wilkes (St Kilda); Ladder Position: 16th Substitutes: James Magner ▲ Brent Moloney ▼

==== Round 21 ====
Round 21
Saturday, 18 August (2:10 pm)	Greater Western Sydney	def. by	Melbourne	Manuka Oval (crowd: 7,561)
2.2 (14); 4.4 (28); 4.5 (29); 9.5 (59)	Q1; Q2; Q3; Final	3.4 (22); 6.10 (46); 9.13 (67); 11.18 (84)	Umpires: Armstrong, Harris, Ryan; Television broadcast: Fox Footy
Greene 2, Giles, Power, Adams, Phillips, McDonald, Smith, Davis	Goals	Howe 3, Sellar 2, Trengove 2, Rivers 2, Green, Grimes
Greene, Giles, Power, Adams, Phillips	Best	Dunn, Grimes, Howe, Trengove, Macdonald
Triple Brisbane Lions premiership player Luke Power played his 300th AFL game in this match.; In freezing weather with strong winds, both sides would produce an array of skill errors, excessive stoppages and missed opportunities throughout the match.; For the second time in its inaugural season, Melbourne would keep Greater Western Sydney goal-less in a third quarter.; Entering time on Melbourne would hold a 43-point lead due as Greater Western Sydney lacked strength in its young forward line to kick the ball long in the windy conditions. However Melbourne would concede the last 3 goals of the game in the last 5 minutes to bridge the gap back to 25 points at full time.; Despite the poor-quality of the match, Melbourne would win a game at Manuka Oval for the first time since Round 11, 2005.; Brownlow Votes: 1. Jonathan Giles (Greater Western Sydney), 2. Nathan Jones (Melbourne), 3. Toby Greene (Greater Western Sydney); Ladder Position: 16th Substitutes: Jack Watts ▲ Tom Couch ▼

==== Round 22 ====
Round 22
Sunday, 26 August (4:40 pm)	Melbourne	def. by	Adelaide	MCG (crowd: 18,450)
3.4 (22); 5.7 (37); 8.10 (58); 11.15 (81)	Q1; Q2; Q3; Final	5.3 (33); 10.8 (68); 20.12 (132); 22.18 (150)	Umpires: Fleer, Wenn, Leppard; Television broadcast: Fox Footy
Green 2, Sellar 2, Rivers 2, Blease, Howe, Jones, Watts, Spencer	Goals	Walker 4, Callinan 4, Dangerfield 3, Tippett 3, Douglas 2, Johncock 2, Petrenko, Reilly, van Berlo, Wright
Sylvia, Bail, Jones, McKenzie, Spencer	Best	Jacobs, Walker, Thompson, Wright, Tippett, Dangerfield, Callinan, Porplyzia, van Berlo
Brad Green announced his retirement in the lead up to this game saying that he would rather retire home at the MCG rather than retiring at Subiaco against Fremantle.; For the first time, both Dean Bailey and Neil Craig would play against their old clubs in assistant coaching positions since both of them were sacked as senior coaches in 2011.; During the first half, Melbourne's midfield would match that of Adelaide's midfield. However due to the lack of a key forward for Melbourne, they would easily give up the ball to Adelaide's defenders. From there Adelaide were able to kick to key forwards Taylor Walker, Kurt Tippett and Ian Callinan whom would put make Melbourne pay on the scoreboard.; Adelaide would blow the game out of Melbourne's reach in the third quarter by kicking 10 goals to 3 and increase their chances of a top 2 finish to the season.; Melbourne's 69-point loss would produce a mammoth 165-point negative-form reversal against Adelaide and send Brad Green out without a fairy-tale finish.; Milestone(s): James Frawley (100th AFL game); Brownlow Votes: 1. Colin Sylvia (Melbourne), 2. Patrick Dangerfield (Adelaide), 3. Taylor Walker (Adelaide); Ladder Position: 16th Substitutes: Neville Jetta ▲ Jared Rivers ▼

==== Round 23 ====
Round 23
Saturday, 1 September (5:40 pm)	Fremantle	def.	Melbourne	Patersons Stadium (crowd: 32,687)
3.5 (23); 7.7 (49); 11.14 (80); 14.17 (101)	Q1; Q2; Q3; Final	1.3 (9); 2.5 (17); 4.8 (32); 5.10 (40)	Umpires: Farmer, Dalgleish, Leppard; Television broadcast: Fox Footy
Ballantyne 3, Griffin 2, Mzungu 2, Pavlich 2, Sandilands 2, Walters, Mundy, Mayne	Goals	Fitzpatrick 2, Blease, Jones, Sellar
Mundy, Fyfe, Sandilands, Duffield, Barlow, Mzungu	Best	Grimes, Sylvia, Trengove, Fitzpatrick
McPharlin (hamstring)	Injuries
With North Melbourne's unconvincing win over Greater Western Sydney earlier in the day, Fremantle had to ensure that they would win by a narrow margin if they were to finish 8th below North Melbourne on percentage and play an elimination final at Perth against West Coast.; In the opening 2 minutes of the game, Fremantle kicked the first 2 goals of the game with Melbourne only gaining 1 possession.; Up until halfway through the second quarter, Melbourne would wrestle control of the match by keeping the a large period of the ball in their forward half. Melbourne would slowly would cut the margin back to 6 points as it appeared that Fremantle were trying to secure a "home" final.; Fremantle would eventually break Melbourne's momentum and begin to successfully hold marks in the forward 50 to score. From that point on they would completely shut Melbourne out of the game to win by 61 points. This however meant that they would have to travel to Melbourne to play Geelong in an elimination final.; Melbourne would finally end a dismal year in which Mark Neeld would make a large amount of list changes over the pre-season for 2013.; Milestone(s): Jared Rivers (150th AFL game); Brownlow Votes: 1. Aaron Sandilands (Fremantle), 2. David Mundy (Fremantle), 3. Nathan Fyfe (Fremantle); Final Ladder Position: 16th Substitutes: Josh Tynan ▲ Sam Blease ▼

== Ladder ==
2012 AFL ladder
Pos	Team	Pld	W	L	D	PF	PA	PP	Pts	
1	Hawthorn	22	17	5	0	2679	1733	154.6	68	Finals series
2	Adelaide	22	17	5	0	2428	1833	132.5	68	Finals series
3	Sydney (P)	22	16	6	0	2290	1629	140.6	64	Finals series
4	Collingwood	22	16	6	0	2123	1823	116.5	64	Finals series
5	West Coast	22	15	7	0	2244	1807	124.2	60	Finals series
6	Geelong	22	15	7	0	2209	1886	117.1	60	Finals series
7	Fremantle	22	14	8	0	1956	1691	115.7	56	Finals series
8	North Melbourne	22	14	8	0	2359	2097	112.5	56	Finals series
9	St Kilda	22	12	10	0	2347	1903	123.3	48	
10	Carlton	22	11	11	0	2079	1925	108.0	44	
11	Essendon	22	11	11	0	2091	2090	100.0	44	
12	Richmond	22	10	11	1	2169	1943	111.6	42	
13	Brisbane Lions	22	10	12	0	1904	2092	91.0	40	
14	Port Adelaide	22	5	16	1	1691	2144	78.9	22	
15	Western Bulldogs	22	5	17	0	1542	2301	67.0	20	
16	Melbourne	22	4	18	0	1580	2341	67.5	16	
17	Gold Coast	22	3	19	0	1509	2481	60.8	12	
18	Greater Western Sydney	22	2	20	0	1270	2751	46.2	8	

Rules for classification: 1) points; 2) percentage; 3) number of points for.
(P) Premiers

=== Ladder breakdown by opposition ===
Opponent	Played	Won	Lost	Drew	Premiership points	Points for	Points against	Percentage (%)
Greater Western Sydney	2	2	0	0	8	219	116	188.79
Gold Coast	1	1	0	0	4	108	66	163.64
Essendon	1	1	0	0	4	58	52	111.54
St Kilda	2	0	2	0	0	148	191	77.49
Western Bulldogs	1	0	1	0	0	67	88	76.14
Collingwood	1	0	1	0	0	87	129	67.44
Port Adelaide	1	0	1	0	0	56	84	66.67
Richmond	2	0	2	0	0	152	234	64.96
Geelong	1	0	1	0	0	76	119	63.87
Brisbane Lions	2	0	2	0	0	139	241	57.68
North Melbourne	1	0	1	0	0	73	127	57.48
Fremantle	2	0	2	0	0	123	218	56.42
Adelaide	1	0	1	0	0	81	150	54.00
Carlton	1	0	1	0	0	49	107	45.79
Hawthorn	1	0	1	0	0	49	115	42.61
West Coast	1	0	1	0	0	58	166	34.94
Sydney	1	0	1	0	0	37	138	26.81
Total	22	4	18	0	16	1580	2341	67.49

== Jeremy Howe's Mark of the Year Nominations ==
A small highlight for the Melbourne Football Club this year was that second year forward Jeremy Howe took several exciting contested marks throughout the season that would each earn him a Mark of the Year nomination. At 192 cm, Jeremy Howe has an athletic leap that had been shown sporadically in his first year at the club in 2011. In Round 8 against Sydney, Howe would win the 2012 Mark of the Year making him the third Melbourne Footballer to win the award in 6 seasons. Overall, he received 8 nominations:

Round 4: In the first quarter against Western Bulldogs, Cale Morton would kick the ball outside of Melbourne's defensive 50 to a small pack with Justin Sherman a few metres in-front. Jeremy Howe would leap above him and land his right knee on Sherman's left shoulder to. After grabbing the ball he would immediately fall on the ground, before immediately getting back up again to kick the ball off to Jack Watts.

Round 4: Later in the game midway through the final quarter, Nathan Jones would kick the ball long towards Melbourne's attacking 50. As a one-on-one contest was forming between Luke Tapscott and Shaun Higgins, Jeremy Howe would run in from the side of the contest and leap onto Tapscott before reaching up and grabbing the ball.

Round 6: Early in the second quarter against Geelong, James Sellar without any real option would bomb the ball from the centre square to inside Melbourne's attacking 50. Jeremy Howe would run towards the open middle of the pack and leap in mid air with Harry Taylor close to his side.

Round 8: Midway through the third quarter against Sydney, James Frawley would rebound the ball out of Melbourne's defensive 50 towards the boundary line. A one-on-one contest was about to form between Heath Grundy and Jeremy Howe. Jeremy Howe would leap firmly on Heath Grundy's left shoulder. He would balance himself on Grundy's shoulders for a couple of seconds before marking the ball and then fall of Grundy's shoulder's to land on his back.

Round 17: Late in the third quarter against Port Adelaide, Jeremy Howe would run in from behind into a one-on-one contest between Alipate Carlile and Stefan Martin inside Melbourne's forward 50. With Troy Chaplin tagging him from behind, Jeremy Howe would leap onto of Carlile and Martin's shoulders to mark the ball. The forward momentum would then carry him over the top of Carlile and Martin as he would fall flat on his chest.

Round 19: In the dying seconds of the game against Gold Coast, Brad Green would kick the ball long into Melbourne's forward 50. With Campbell Brown tagging him, Jeremy Howe would leap over the top of Brown before colliding with Rohan Bail while falling to the ground. Howe would then take his run up and slot a goal after the siren.

Round 20: In the early stages of the second quarter, Jack Grimes would run around Jason Gram in the midfield, before kicking long towards a one-on-one contest between Brad Green and Tom Simpkin. Jeremy Howe would run in from the boundary-line perpendicular to the flight of the ball. Howe would then leap sideways before colliding with Simpkin to take the mark and then fall on top of him.

Round 21: Midway through the third quarter, Jordie McKenzie would kick the ball long to a pack from the center square into Melbourne's forward 50. Jeremy Howe would sprint forwards before leaping above Matthew Buntine to take the mark. He would then land on top of Chad Cornes whom was trying to spoil the ball after he took the mark.

== Off Field Disasters ==
Throughout 2012, Melbourne was faced with a string of off-field disasters that begun in February and continued to commence throughout the rest of the year.

The off-field issues started on 2 February when club president Jim Stynes chose to resign in order to focus on his fight against cancer after having an operation the same day, Don McLardy would take over acting as full-time president. A month later on 9 March exciting forward Liam Jurrah was charged for assault with a machete at a town camp in Alice Springs and would face Alice Springs Magistrates Court throughout the course of the year.

On 20 March, Jim Stynes would finally lose his long battle with cancer, this ultimately had a major impact on the entire football club and played a major effect on the on-field morale of the team.

On 3 April, former St Kilda coach Grant Thomas would accuse Neeld of treating indigenous players differently from non-indigenous players by lecturing them as a group rather them lecturing them individually, Neeld would angrily deny these comments from Thomas.

2 days later Melbourne cut a 2 million dollar sponsorship deal with Energywatch after CEO Ben Polis made a series of discriminatory remarks and posts against women, Aboriginals and Asians on Facebook, one of which featured an edited picture of Liam Jurrah holding a machete in his hand whilst playing on-field. This left Melbourne without any major sponsors until Webjet signed a one-year deal a week later and Opel followed soon after as Melbourne's second major sponsor in Round 4.

Towards the end of the season, Melbourne's tanking speculations in 2009 were reignited when ex-Melbourne footballer and current Carlton footballer Brock McLean claimed he left Melbourne because they were tanking (i.e. deliberately losing games for better draft picks). This caused an AFL investigation into Melbourne where several key ex-staff revealed that a meeting was held in the Junction Oval's tin-shed known as "The Vault" after Melbourne's round 15 win over Port Adelaide in 2009. The meeting was held by General Manager of Coaching Chris Connolly and 10 other board members to ensure that Melbourne didn't win more than 4 matches for that season and hence ensure that Melbourne would receive a priority pick at the start of the 2009 AFL draft. On 19 February, Melbourne were found not guilty for tanking. However Chris Connolly was suspended until 1 February 2014 and Dean Bailey was suspended for the first 16 round of the 2013 AFL season. In addition, Melbourne were fined $500,000 for their handling of both Connolly and Bailey during 2009.

Despite Melbourne's horrid year on and off the field they would still record a small operating profit of $77,618. This would be their fourth consecutive operating profit since 2009.

== Awards ==
=== Brownlow Medal tally ===
Player	1 vote games	2 vote games	3 vote games	Total votes
Nathan Jones	1	5	1	(14)
Jack Watts	0	0	1	(3)
Jack Grimes	1	1	0	(3)
James Magner	0	1	0	(2)
Colin Sylvia	2	0	0	(2)
Matthew Bate	1	0	0	(1)
Daniel Nicholson	1	0	0	(1)
Sam Blease	1	0	0	(1)
Total	7	7	2	(27)

=== Keith 'Bluey' Truscott Medal tally (top 10) ===
Position	Player	Votes
1st	Nathan Jones	(368)
2nd	Jack Grimes	(348)
3rd	Tom McDonald	(314)
4th	Jordie McKenzie	(312)
5th	Jared Rivers	(310)
6th	Colin Garland	(297)
7th	Jeremy Howe	(293)
8th	Jack Trengove	(275)
9th	James Frawley	(266)
10th	Lynden Dunn	(257)

Keith 'Bluey' Truscott Trophy – Nathan Jones

Sid Anderson Memorial Trophy (Second in the Best and Fairest) – Jack Grimes

Ron Barassi Snr Memorial Trophy (Third in the Best and Fairest) – Tom McDonald

Ivor Warne-Smith Memorial Trophy (Fourth in the Best and Fairest) – Jordie McKenzie

Dick Taylor Memorial Trophy (Fifth in the Best and Fairest) – Jared Rivers

Harold Ball Memorial Trophy (Best Young Player) – Tom McDonald

Troy Broadbridge Trophy (highest polling MFC player in the Casey Best and Fairest) – Tom Couch

Ron Barassi Leadership Award – Jack Grimes and Jack Trengove

Ian Ridley Club Ambassador Award – Max Gawn

Norm Smith Memorial Trophy (Coach's Award) – Jordie McKenzie

Leading Goalkicker Award – Mitch Clark (29)
