= Ben Sinclair =

Ben Sinclair may refer to:

- Ben Sinclair (actor), American actor, writer, director, and producer
- Ben Sinclair (footballer), Australian former professional Australian rules footballer who played for the Collingwood Football Club
