= Tom McDonald (Australian footballer) =

Australian rules footballer (born 1992)

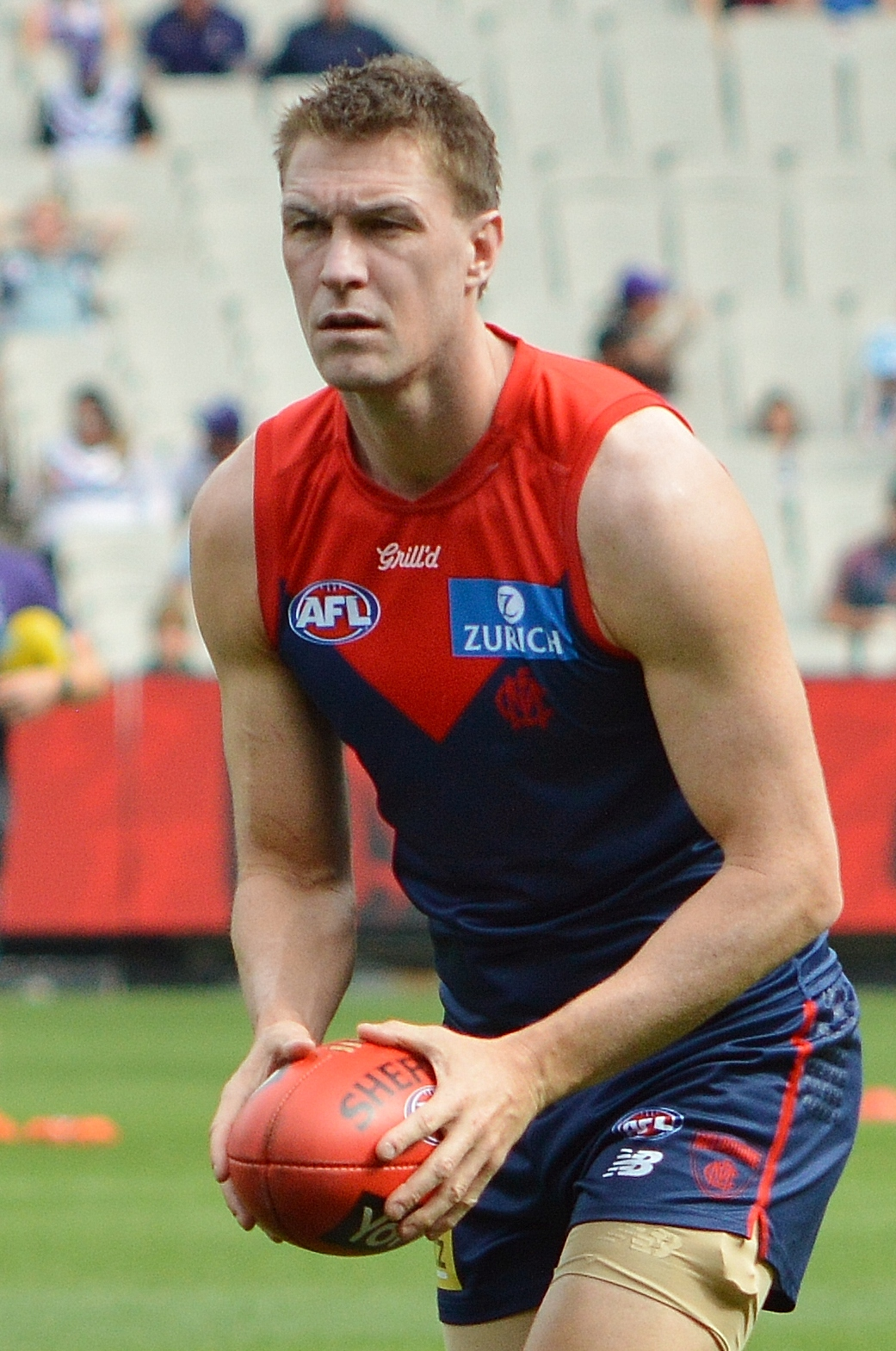
- McDonald playing in April 2025.

Personal information
- Full name: Thomas McDonald
- Born: 18 September 1992 (age 34)
- Original team: North Ballarat (TAC Cup)
- Draft: No. 53, 2010 national draft
- Debut: Round 23, 2011, Melbourne vs. Gold Coast, at MCG
- Height: 195 cm (6 ft 5 in)
- Weight: 101 kg (223 lb)
- Position: Key forward / key defender

Club information
- Current club: Melbourne
- Number: 25

Playing career^{1}
Years	Club	Games (Goals)
2011–	Melbourne	257 (170)
- ^{1} Playing statistics correct to the end of round 22, 2026.

Career highlights
- AFL premiership player: 2021; Melbourne leading goalkicker: 2018; Harold Ball Memorial Trophy: 2012; AFL Rising Star nominee: 2012

Thomas McDonald (born 18 September 1992) is a former professional Australian rules footballer playing for the Melbourne Football Club in the Australian Football League (AFL). 1.95 metres (6 ft 5 in) tall and weighing 101 kilograms (223 lb), McDonald has played both forward and defence. He spent his final junior year playing in the TAC Cup for the North Ballarat Rebels and played top-level football when he played two matches for North Ballarat in the Victorian Football League (VFL). He was recruited by the Melbourne Football Club with the fifty-third overall selection of the 2010 AFL draft and made his AFL debut during the 2011 season. His second year saw him earn a Rising Star nomination playing in Melbourne's backline, and finished sixth overall.

== Early life ==
Growing up in Edenhope, Victoria, McDonald attended Edenhope College before moving to Ballarat to board at St Patrick's College for year twelve. He played for the North Ballarat Rebels in the TAC Cup in 2010 as a key forward and played two matches for the North Ballarat Football Club seniors in the Victorian Football League (VFL) in mid-2010.

== AFL career ==
=== 2011–2014: Early career ===
McDonald was recruited by the Melbourne Football Club with their fourth selection and fifty-third overall in the 2010 national draft. After playing in the 2011 NAB Cup, he spent the majority of the season playing in the Victorian Football League (VFL) for Melbourne's affiliate team, the Casey Scorpions. He made his AFL debut in the thirty point win against Gold Coast at the MCG in round twenty-three where he recorded eighteen disposals, six marks, six rebound-50s and four tackles, playing as a backman, and he was named in the best players by AFL Media and The Age. He maintained his spot in the team the next week for the final match of the year in the eight point loss against Port Adelaide at the Adelaide Oval, to finish with two matches for the year.

After a strong pre-season in 2012, he played his first match for the year in the 108-point loss to The West Coast Eagles at Patersons Stadium in round two. He spent the season playing full back. After playing on Jonathon Patton in the seventy-eight point win against Greater Western Sydney at the Melbourne Cricket Ground in round thirteen he was named the round nominee for the Rising Star where he recorded twenty-six disposals, four marks and three tackles. He missed his first match of the year in round fifteen after he suffered from a bleeding lung as a result of a collision during the sixty-one point loss against Brisbane the previous week. He returned for the round sixteen match against Fremantle at Etihad Stadium and played the remainder of the year to finish with twenty matches for the season. His performances during the year earned him third-place in Melbourne's best and fairest count, behind Nathan Jones and Jack Grimes, and the Harold Ball Memorial Trophy as Melbourne's best young player. Furthermore, he finished sixth in the Rising Star award.

After the departure of defender, Jared Rivers, McDonald played a more prominent role in Melbourne's backline during the 2013 season. He played his first match of the year in the 148-point loss against Essendon at the Melbourne Cricket Ground in round two and played the next four matches before missing four weeks due to a shoulder injury. He returned to the side for the eighty-three point loss against Collingwood in the annual Queen's Birthday clash in round eleven. He did not miss a match for the remainder of the season to finish with seventeen matches for the year and a tenth-place finish in Melbourne's best and fairest count.

The 2014 season saw McDonald play his fiftieth AFL match in the thirty-three point loss against Collingwood in the Queen's Birthday match in round twelve. He played twenty-one matches for the season, resulting in a seventh-place finish in Melbourne's best and fairest.

=== 2015–2016 ===
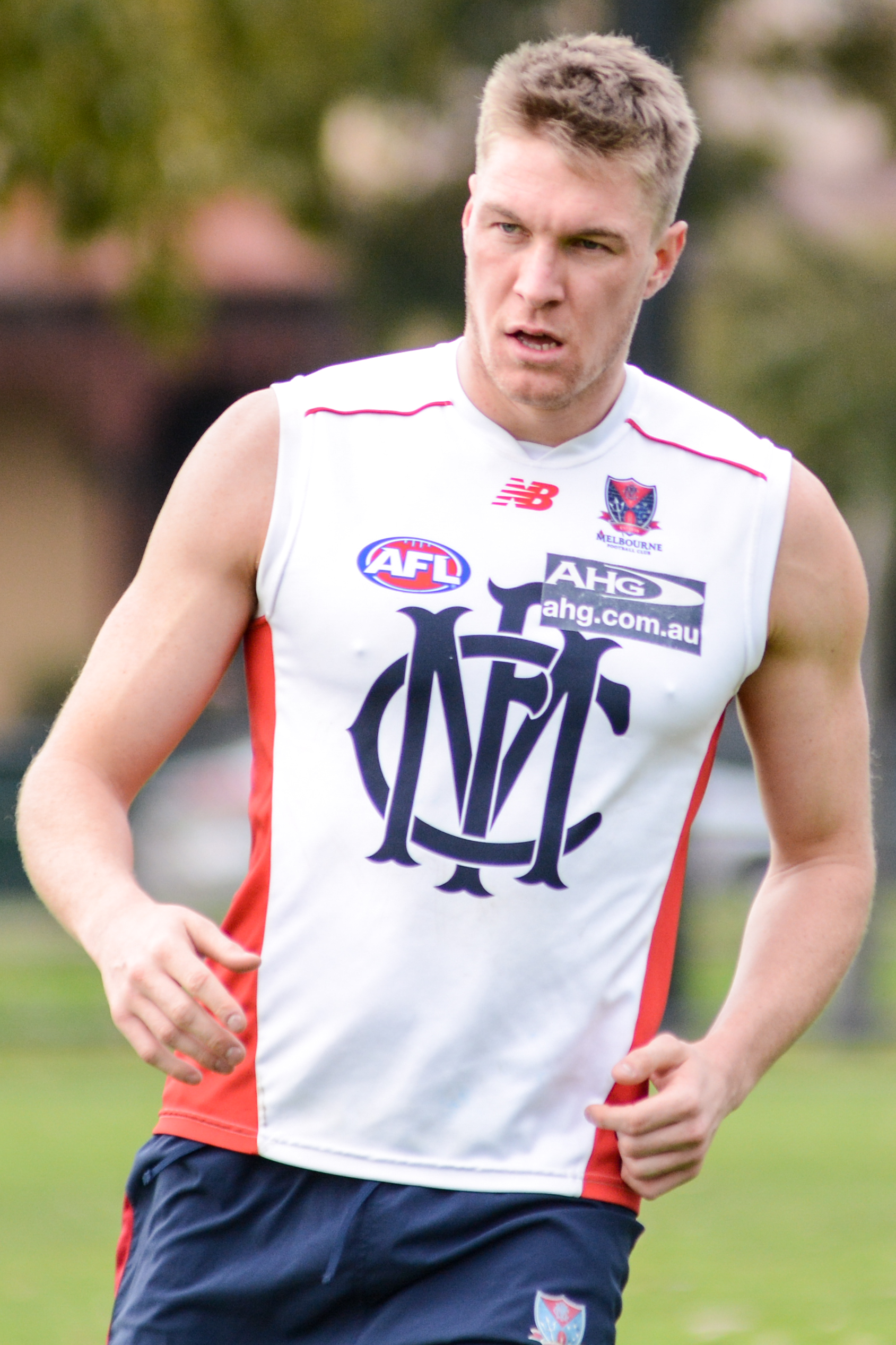
McDonald at training in July 2015

After introducing a more offensive style into the way his game, McDonald opened the 2015 AFL season with a team-high twenty-six disposals in the twenty-six point win against Gold Coast and was named in the best players. The departure of James Frawley, saw McDonald emerge as the number one defender at Melbourne. He spent the second half of the year playing in both the forward and back line, which drew the praise of both then-senior coach Paul Roos and backline coach, Jade Rawlings, for his versatility. He played every match for the year, which earned him a third-place finish in Melbourne's best and fairest.

On the eve of the 2016 season, McDonald was named in Melbourne's leadership group. Due to finish the season out-of-contract, speculation surrounded his season as to whether he would re-sign with the club. He ultimately re-signed with the club in August on a two-year deal, tying him to Melbourne until the end of the 2018 season. The round sixteen match against Fremantle at TIO Stadium in a thirty-two point win saw McDonald record a career-high thirty-one disposals, ten marks, and six rebound-50s, which earned him the centre half-back position in AFL Media's team of the week. He played his 100th AFL match in the two-point win against Gold Coast at the Melbourne Cricket Ground in round nineteen. He played every match during the year and finished sixth in Melbourne's best and fairest count.

=== 2017-2026 ===
Following Max Gawn's early season hamstring injury, McDonald was used as a back-up ruckman to assist the undersized Cameron Pedersen. McDonald also played as a wingman. Playing in this role, McDonald was awarded three Brownlow votes for amassing 26 disposals, twelve marks and a goal against the Essendon Bombers in round 5.

Following his success in the forward line during the previous season, it was believed that McDonald would continue in his newfound role while assisting in the ruck when required. However, a niggling toe injury during the following pre-season kept McDonald sidelined for the opening five rounds of the 2018 AFL season, before he finally returned with two goals and 16 disposals in a 36-point win against Essendon. During the 2018 Queen's Birthday match, McDonald kicked a career high six goals as Melbourne lost to Collingwood by 42 points. Mid-way through the season, McDonald signed with the Demons for a further four years.

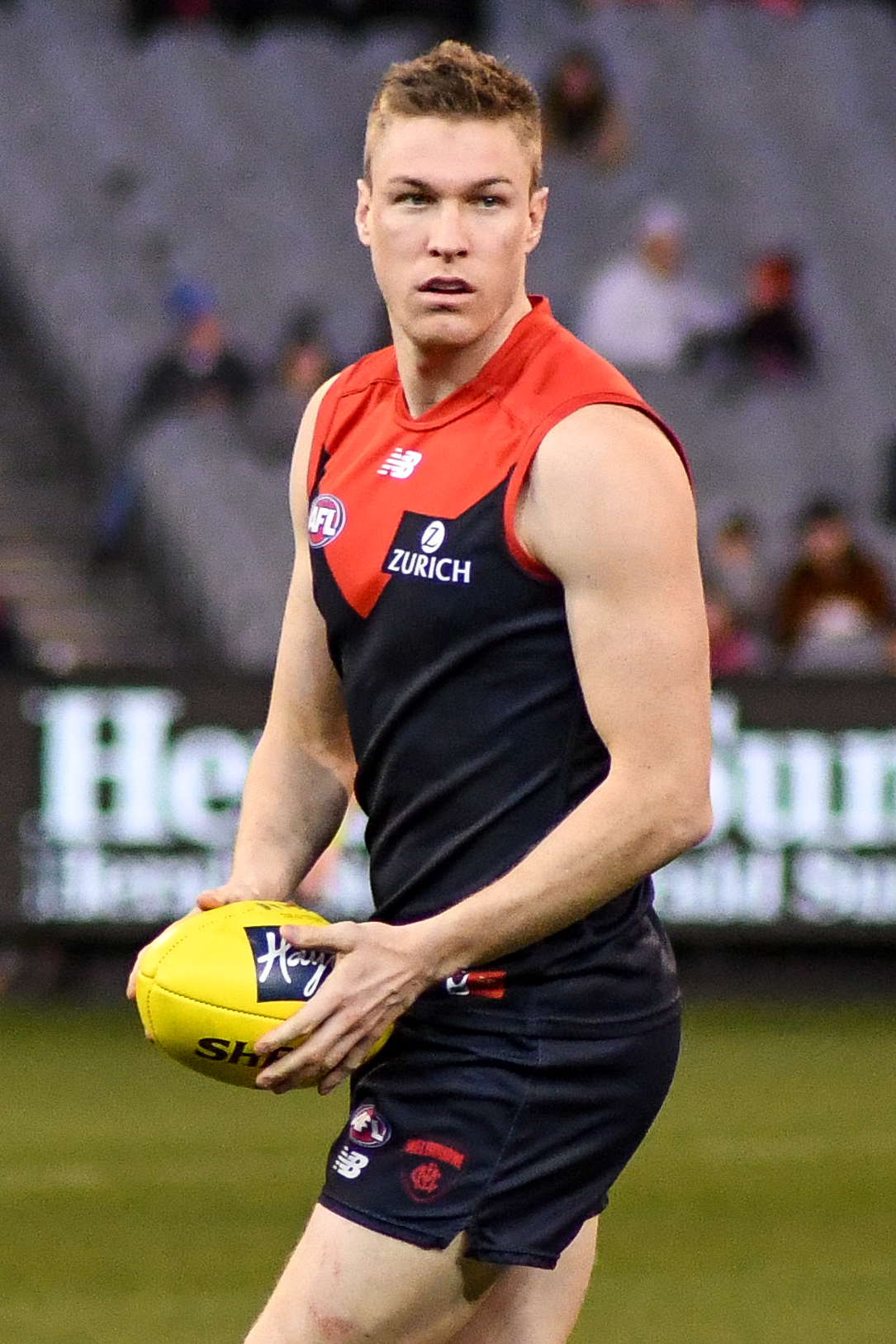
McDonald in 2018

McDonald played a major role in Melbourne's 33-point Semi-Final win against Hawthorn, kicking a match high four goals as Melbourne triumphed by 33 points. Following Melbourne's loss to West Coast in the preliminary final the following week, McDonald scored 53 goals for the season, the most since any Melbourne player since Brad Green's 55 goal haul in 2010.

McDonald’s final game was in Melbourne’s wildcard final loss to Carlton on 29 August 2026.

=== Views and personal life ===
In 2021 McDonald commented that he thought it was ‘ethically wrong’ for the AFL to mandate that AFL players be vaccinated against COVID to play. He subsequently was criticised by some in the media for this view.

McDonald has previously appeared on a podcast for the right-wing think tank, the Institute of Public Affairs.

He has completed a commerce degree at Melbourne University.

== Statistics ==
Updated to the end of round 22, 2026.

Legend
G	Goals	K	Kicks	D	Disposals	T	Tackles
B	Behinds	H	Handballs	M	Marks

Season	Team	No.	Games	Totals							Averages (per game)							Votes
Season	Team	No.	Games	G	B	K	H	D	M	T	G	B	K	H	D	M	T	Votes
2011	Melbourne	43	2	0	1	16	12	28	9	4	0.0	0.5	8.0	6.0	14.0	4.5	2.0	0
2012	Melbourne	25	20	0	1	161	171	332	94	40	0.0	0.1	8.1	8.6	16.6	4.7	2.0	0
2013	Melbourne	25	17	0	1	142	134	276	72	34	0.0	0.1	8.4	7.9	16.2	4.2	2.0	0
2014	Melbourne	25	21	2	0	195	118	313	101	35	0.1	0.0	9.3	5.6	14.9	4.8	1.7	0
2015	Melbourne	25	22	5	4	268	149	417	155	44	0.2	0.2	12.2	6.8	19.0	7.0	2.0	0
2016	Melbourne	25	22	1	0	258	155	413	148	36	0.0	0.0	11.7	7.0	18.8	6.7	1.6	0
2017	Melbourne	25	22	23	7	227	161	388	139	50	1.0	0.3	10.3	7.3	17.6	6.3	2.3	9
2018	Melbourne	25	20	53	20	189	121	310	134	47	2.7	1.0	9.5	6.1	15.5	6.7	2.4	4
2019	Melbourne	25	15	18	15	128	77	205	65	23	1.2	1.0	8.5	5.1	13.7	4.3	1.5	6
2020 (Note: The 2020 season was played with 17 home-and-away matches per team (down from 22) and 16-minute quarters with time on (down from 20-minute quarters with time on) due to the impact of the COVID-19 pandemic.)	Melbourne	25	9	7	1	50	27	77	29	15	0.8	0.1	5.6	3.0	8.6	3.2	1.7	0
2021^{#}	Melbourne	25	23	33	22	217	105	322	122	51	1.4	1.0	9.4	4.6	14.0	5.3	2.2	8
2022	Melbourne	25	9	15	10	66	31	97	36	10	1.7	1.1	7.3	3.4	10.8	4.0	1.1	2
2023	Melbourne	25	8	9	4	43	29	72	24	15	1.1	0.5	5.4	3.6	9.0	3.0	1.9	0
2024	Melbourne	25	22	3	0	230	86	316	132	37	0.1	0.0	10.5	3.9	14.4	6.0	1.7	0
2025	Melbourne	25	17	1	0	163	82	245	104	19	0.1	0.0	9.6	4.8	14.4	6.1	1.1	0
2026	Melbourne	25	8	0	0	68	33	101	42	8	0.0	0.0	8.5	4.1	12.6	5.3	1.0	0
Career			257	170	86	2421	1491	3912	1406	468	0.7	0.3	9.4	5.8	15.2	5.5	1.8	29

== Honours and achievements ==
Team

- AFL premiership player (Melbourne): 2021
- McClelland Trophy (Melbourne): 2021

Individual

- Melbourne leading goalkicker: 2018
- Harold Ball Memorial Trophy: 2012
- AFL Rising Star nominee: 2012 (Round 13)
