= Webjet =

Australian travel agency

- Type: Public
- Traded as: ASX: WJL
- Industry: Travel
- Founded: 1998
- Founder: David Clarke, John Lemish, Allan Nahum
- Headquarters: Melbourne, Australia
- Services: Travel Booking

Webjet is an online travel agency that allows users to book airline tickets and hotel reservations. Webjet was established by former Jetset Travel (now Helloworld Travel) executives David Clarke, Allan Nahum and John Lemish in 1998. Webjet is currently owned by Webjet Group, following a demerger from Webjet Limited in September 2024.

Webjet also offers other travel-related services, such as car hire, insurance, holiday packages and flight deals, and is most commonly used in Australia and New Zealand.

== History ==
Webjet was listed on the Australian Securities Exchange in 2000 via a reverse takeover of Roper River Resources NL. Roper River Resources NL became Webjet NL on 18 April 2000, and Webjet Limited on 15 June 2000. On 31 May 2001, Webjet's booking system became fully automated.

In April 2010, Webjet began operating in North America through a joint venture. John Guscic became Managing Director in February 2011. Webjet concluded its North American joint venture in June 2017.

Webjet also acquired Zuji in Australia, Hong Kong, and Singapore in March 2013. Zuji was sold in November 2016. In September 2024, Webjet Limited demerged into Web Travel Group and Webjet Group.
