= 2012 AFL Rising Star =

Australian rules football award

2012 NAB AFL Rising Star
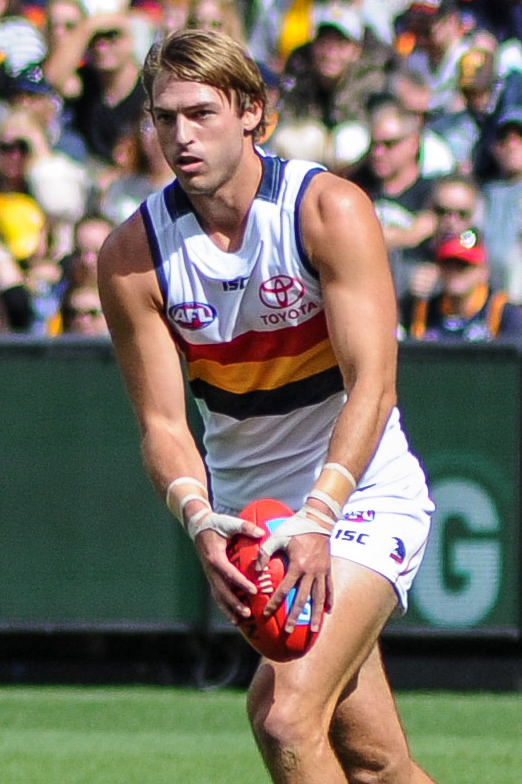
- Daniel Talia, winner of the 2012 Rising Star, playing in April 2017
- Sponsored by: National Australia Bank
- Date: 5 September
- Country: Australia
- Ron Evans medallist: Daniel Talia (Adelaide)

The NAB AFL Rising Star award is given annually to a stand out young player in the Australian Football League. The 2012 Ron Evans Medal was awarded to one of the 23 nominees. The 2012 award was won by Daniel Talia of the Adelaide Football Club.

== Eligibility ==
Every round, an Australian Football League rising star nomination is given to a stand out young player. To be eligible for nomination, a player must be under 21 on 1 January of that year and have played 10 or fewer senior games before the start of the season; a player who is suspended may be nominated, but is not eligible to win the award. At the end of the year, one of the 23 nominees is the winner of award.

== Nominations ==
Round	Player	Club	Ref.
1	Claye Beams	Brisbane Lions	
2	Jeremy Cameron	Greater Western Sydney	
3	Dylan Grimes	Richmond	
4	Mitch Wallis	Western Bulldogs	
5	Tomas Bugg	Greater Western Sydney	
6	Steven Motlop	Geelong	
7	Stephen Coniglio	Greater Western Sydney	
8	Mitchell Golby	Brisbane Lions	
9	Jake Carlisle	Essendon	
10	Dylan Shiel	Greater Western Sydney	
11	Ben Sinclair	Collingwood	
12	Daniel Talia	Adelaide	
13	Tom McDonald	Melbourne	
14	Toby Greene	Greater Western Sydney	
15	Arryn Siposs	St Kilda	
16	Josh Caddy	Gold Coast	
17	Brandon Ellis	Richmond	
18	Adam Treloar	Greater Western Sydney	
19	Devon Smith	Greater Western Sydney	
20	Sam Blease	Melbourne	
21	Sam Shaw	Adelaide	
22	Chad Wingard	Port Adelaide	
23	Dom Tyson	Greater Western Sydney	

== Final voting ==
	Player	Club	Votes
1	Daniel Talia	Adelaide	43
2	Jeremy Cameron	Greater Western Sydney	35
3	Mitch Wallis	Western Bulldogs	19
4	Adam Treloar	Greater Western Sydney	15
5	Steven Motlop	Geelong	11
6	Tom McDonald	Melbourne	7
7	Josh Caddy	Gold Coast	3
8	Stephen Coniglio	Greater Western Sydney	2
Source: AFL Record Season Guide 2015
