= Steven Motlop =

Australian rules footballer

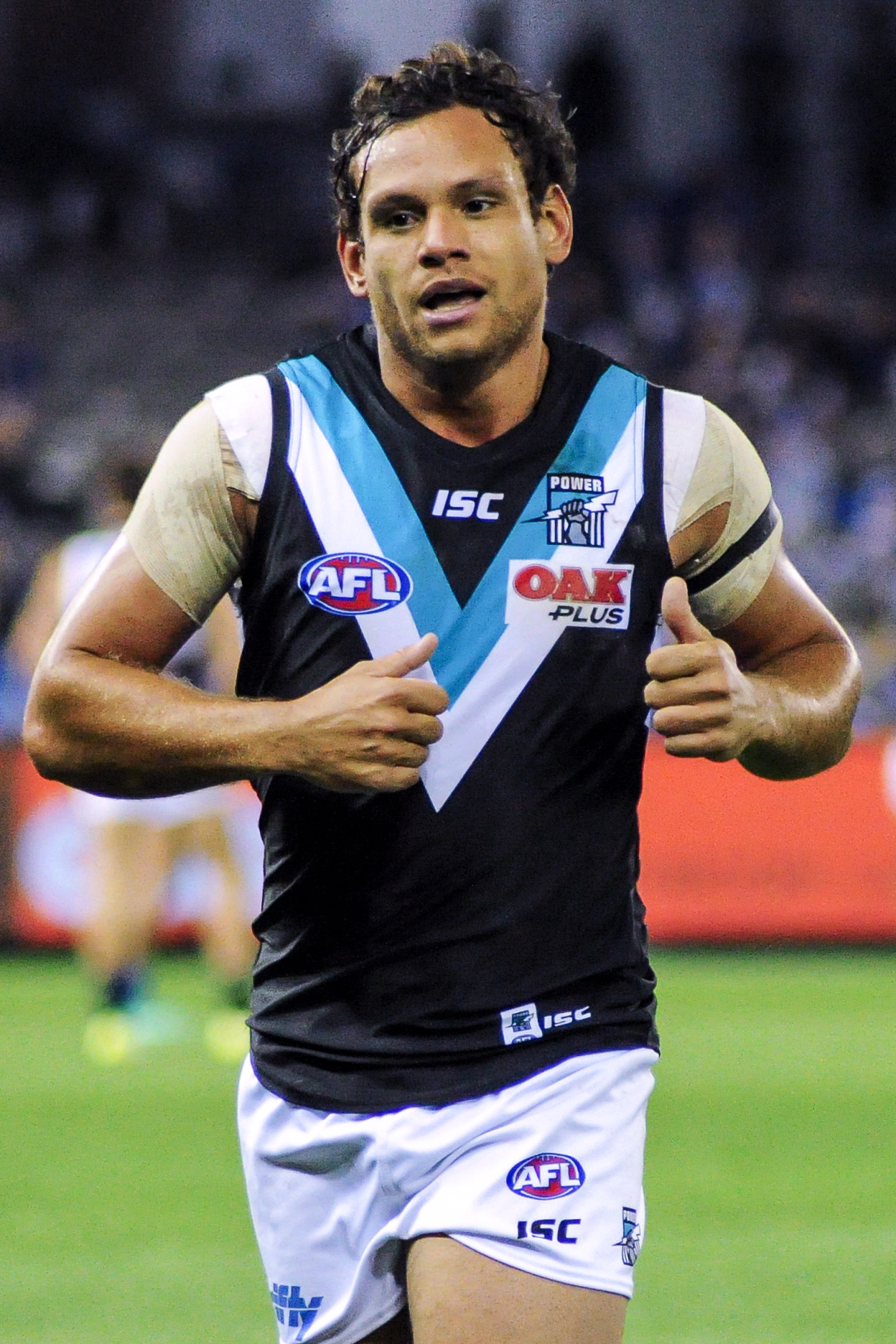
- Motlop playing for Port Adelaide in June 2018

Personal information
- Born: 12 March 1991 (age 35); Darwin, Australia
- Original team: Wanderers (NTFL)
- Draft: No. 39, 2008 national draft
- Height: 183 cm (6 ft 0 in)
- Weight: 82 kg (181 lb)
- Position: Forward / midfielder

Playing career^{1}
| Years | Club | Games (Goals) |
| 2009–2017 | Geelong | 135 (175) |
| 2018–2022 | Port Adelaide | 82 (54) |
| Total | | 217 (229) |

International team honours^{2}
| Years | Team | Games (Goals) |
| 2013 | Australia | 2 (2) |
- ^{1} Playing statistics correct to the end of 2022.^{2} Representative statistics correct as of 2013.

Career highlights
- 2× 22under22 team: 2012, 2013; 2012 AFL Rising Star nominee

Steven Motlop (born 12 March 1991) is a former professional Australian rules footballer for the Port Adelaide Football Club in the Australian Football League (AFL), having previously played for the Geelong Football Club from 2009 to 2017.

== Early life ==
Motlop was selected by Geelong with the 39th pick in the 2008 AFL draft. Had previously been playing with the Wanderers Football Clubin the Northern Territory Football League (NTFL). He is the younger brother of North Melbourne premiership player Shannon Motlop and former North Melbourne and Port Adelaide forward Daniel Motlop, and the cousin of Port's Marlon Motlop.

His performances at the 2008 National AFL Under 18 and Under 16 championships were hampered by a shoulder injury, which was operated on prior to the draft, but he still managed to kick five goals in the division two final at the MCG.

== AFL career ==
=== Geelong (2009–2017) ===
Motlop dislocated his shoulder in his debut AFL match against Hawthorn during the second quarter in the round 2, 2010 match.

In round 6 of the 2012 AFL season Motlop was awarded the round nomination for the 2012 AFL Rising Star, after gathering 28 possessions against Melbourne.

After a strong 2013 season, Motlop was selected in the AFL Players' Association's inaugural 22under22 team. In 2014, Round 16, Motlop collected a career high 30 disposals to go along with 5 marks and 4 tackles.

=== Port Adelaide (2018–2022) ===
During the 2017 trade period, Motlop joined Port Adelaide as a restricted free agent, after Geelong elected not to match Port Adelaide's contract offer. In Showdown 44, with 21 seconds left, Motlop kicked the match-winning goal which saw Port Adelaide win by 5 points against Adelaide, ending their rival's 5-game winning streak against the Power. In 2020, Round 7, Motlop injured his foot. Scans showed that he had sprained ligaments in his ankle, and he missed four weeks with the injury.

Motlop retired in August 2022.

== Statistics ==
Statistics are correct to the end of the 2022 season.

Legend
| G | Goals | K | Kicks | D | Disposals | T | Tackles |
| B | Behinds | H | Handballs | M | Marks |

| Season | Team | No. | Games | Totals | | | | | | | Averages (per game) | | | | | | |
| Season | Team | No. | Games | G | B | K | H | D | M | T | G | B | K | H | D | M | T |
|---|---|---|---|---|---|---|---|---|---|---|---|---|---|---|---|---|---|
| 2009 | Geelong | 32 | 0 | — | — | — | — | — | — | — | — | — | — | — | — | — | — |
| 2010 | Geelong | 32 | 1 | 0 | 0 | 2 | 0 | 2 | 1 | 1 | 0.0 | 0.0 | 2.0 | 0.0 | 2.0 | 1.0 | 1.0 |
| 2011 | Geelong | 32 | 4 | 2 | 3 | 23 | 12 | 35 | 4 | 7 | 0.5 | 0.8 | 5.8 | 3.0 | 8.8 | 1.0 | 1.8 |
| 2012 | Geelong | 32 | 22 | 26 | 14 | 192 | 104 | 296 | 52 | 52 | 1.2 | 0.6 | 8.7 | 4.7 | 13.4 | 2.4 | 2.4 |
| 2013 | Geelong | 32 | 24 | 44 | 25 | 282 | 146 | 428 | 78 | 45 | 1.8 | 1.0 | 11.8 | 6.1 | 17.8 | 3.3 | 1.9 |
| 2014 | Geelong | 32 | 17 | 17 | 16 | 228 | 104 | 332 | 81 | 27 | 1.0 | 0.9 | 13.4 | 6.1 | 19.5 | 4.8 | 1.6 |
| 2015 | Geelong | 32 | 20 | 26 | 16 | 199 | 142 | 441 | 78 | 68 | 1.3 | 0.8 | 15.0 | 7.1 | 22.0 | 3.9 | 3.4 |
| 2016 | Geelong | 32 | 23 | 38 | 19 | 326 | 141 | 467 | 93 | 59 | 1.5 | 0.8 | 13.5 | 5.8 | 19.4 | 3.8 | 2.4 |
| 2017 | Geelong | 32 | 23 | 22 | 7 | 252 | 191 | 446 | 66 | 59 | 1.0 | 0.3 | 10.9 | 8.4 | 19.3 | 2.9 | 2.6 |
| 2018 | Port Adelaide | 6 | 21 | 11 | 6 | 214 | 156 | 370 | 59 | 65 | 0.5 | 0.3 | 10.2 | 7.4 | 17.6 | 2.8 | 3.1 |
| 2019 | Port Adelaide | 6 | 14 | 7 | 5 | 129 | 95 | 224 | 49 | 39 | 0.5 | 0.3 | 9.2 | 6.8 | 16.0 | 3.5 | 2.8 |
| 2020 (Note: The 2020 season was played with 17 home-and-away matches per team (down from 22) and 16-minute quarters with time on (down from 20-minute quarters with time on) due to the impact of the COVID-19 pandemic.) | Port Adelaide | 6 | 14 | 13 | 2 | 84 | 65 | 149 | 33 | 23 | 0.9 | 0.1 | 6.0 | 4.6 | 10.6 | 2.4 | 1.6 |
| 2021 | Port Adelaide | 6 | 19 | 13 | 8 | 169 | 128 | 297 | 81 | 47 | 0.7 | 0.4 | 8.9 | 6.7 | 15.6 | 4.3 | 2.5 |
| 2022 | Port Adelaide | 6 | 14 | 10 | 6 | 99 | 54 | 153 | 47 | 37 | 0.7 | 0.4 | 7.1 | 3.9 | 11.0 | 3.4 | 2.6 |
| Career | | | 217 | 229 | 127 | 2300 | 1338 | 3638 | 722 | 532 | 1.1 | 0.58 | 10.6 | 6.2 | 16.8 | 3.3 | 2.5 |
