= Jordan Bannister =

Australian rules footballer and umpire

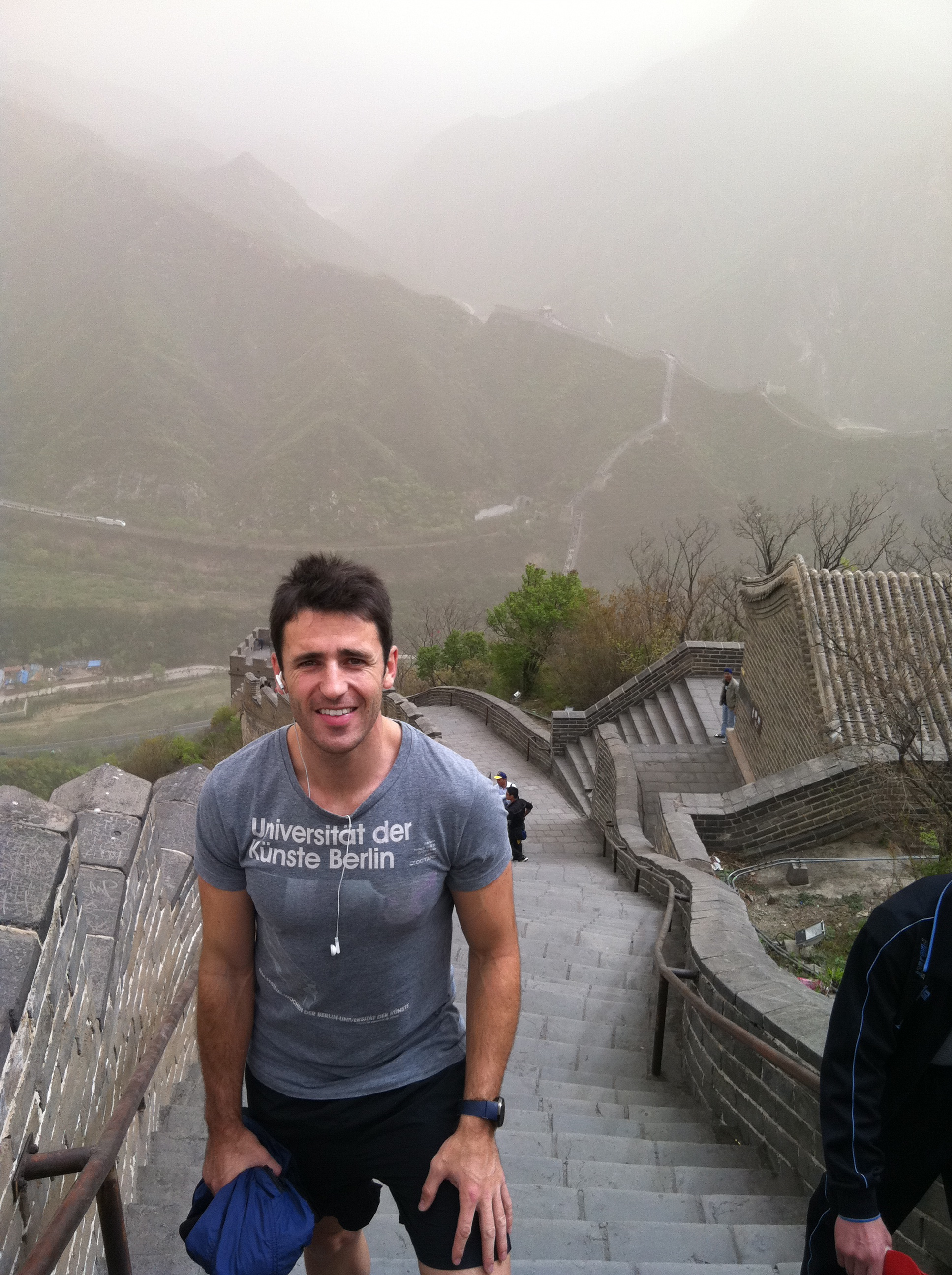

Personal information
- Full name: Jordan Scott Bannister
- Born: 31 October 1982 (age 44); Melbourne, Victoria, Australia
- Original team: Therry-Penola/Calder Cannons
- Draft: 47th overall, 2000 AFL draft 69th overall, 2003 AFL draft
- Height: 190 cm (6 ft 3 in)
- Weight: 89 kg (196 lb)
- Position: Defender

Playing career^{1}
Years	Club	Games (Goals)	
2001–2003	Essendon	14 (0)	
2004–2009	Carlton	53 (17)	
Total		67 (17)	

Umpiring career
Years	League	Role	Games
2010–2011	VFL	Field umpire	17
2012–2016	AFL	Field umpire	97
- ^{1} Playing statistics correct to the end of 2009.

Jordan Scott Bannister (born 31 October 1982) is a former Australian rules football player and umpire, who played for Carlton and Essendon and umpired in the Australian Football League.

== Playing career ==
=== Essendon ===
Bannister made his debut for the Essendon Football Club in Round 12, 2001 against Adelaide. He was delisted by Essendon at the end of the 2003 season, and decided to re-nominate for the national draft.

Bannister played for Essendon 2001 from 2003 for a total of 14 games 0 goals.

=== Carlton ===
he was selected by the Carlton Football Club in the national draft with its sixth round selection (#69 overall). He made his debut there in Round 1, 2004 against Fremantle. He was noted as a hard-running defender, often taking tagging roles on mobile forwards, and he polled two Brownlow Medal votes against Collingwood in a shut down role against Nathan Buckley. He struggled for regular selection in 2005, finally breaking through for a regular berth in mid-2006, playing ten out of eleven games before being suspended by the AFL Tribunal.

Bannister began the 2007 season playing with Carlton's VFL-affiliate, the Northern Bullants, and it appeared that he would struggle for selection under Carlton's youth policy. He was brought back to the seniors against the hard-running Western Bulldogs, and made an immediate impact with consecutive shut-downs of Brad Johnson and Chad Cornes, ensuring his position in the team for the rest of the year. He played the first five games of 2008, but was struck down by injury and was unable to regain his position in the team for the rest of the year. In 2009, Bannister was unable to break into the Carlton senior team on a regular basis, playing only two games for the year. He was a member of the Bullants' losing grand final team in 2009. Bannister was delisted from the Carlton Football Club at the end of the 2009 season.

Bannister played for Carlton from 2004 until 2009 for a total of 53 games and 17 goals.

In 2015, Bannister revealed during the 2007 season of how his former senior coach Denis Pagan urged him to enjoy the second half of Carlton’s Round 16 clash with Brisbane at the ‘Gabba because it would be the last of his AFL career. “He told me at half-time of that game I’ve had enough chances and son, that will be your last one, go out and enjoy the second half. That’s done’,” “Which, really rattled me because I knew Denis was a man of his word. Luckily enough, something happened a day later ...” Pagan was sacked as senior coach of Carlton and Brett Ratten took the reins, “Ratts straight away came up to me, because he’d heard what had happened and a few of the boys had too He said: ‘I’m going to play you every game for the rest of the season”.

== Umpiring career ==
Following retirement from playing, Bannister pursued umpiring under the AFL's Player Pathway Program. He umpired at metropolitan and country level for most of 2010 but was appointed to his senior VFL debut in Round 17. Formally added to the VFL list in 2011 he umpired 15 senior matches and the VFL Reserves elimination final that year.

Successfully trialing in the 2012 pre-season, Bannister was appointed to the AFL list of umpires for 2012 in the specially created 33rd position reserved for player pathway umpires. He officiated in his first AFL match in Round 1, between North Melbourne and his former club Essendon. Capping an outstanding first season, he was selected to umpire in the finals and officiated in the Geelong–Fremantle elimination final.

On 15 April 2013, Bannister's brother, Rick, was involved in a horse jumping accident which left him a quadriplegic. Jordan umpired the remainder of the 2013 season but announced his retirement in October citing the difficulty of balancing work, family and umpiring; but five months later, after Rick's condition and rehabilitation had improved, Bannister returned to the AFL umpiring panel; Rick died later that year.

Bannister retired from umpiring shortly before the 2017 season, finishing his career having umpired 97 AFL games. Across an AFL career spanning sixteen years, Bannister played and umpired a total of 164 games.

Since 2023, Bannister has been an AFL Tribunal Panelist.

In 2025, Bannister returned to umpiring joining the AFLW Umpiring panel.

Bannister's father, Wayne Bannister was a boxer who was the Australian welterweight champion.
