= Ben Sinclair (footballer) =

Australian rules footballer

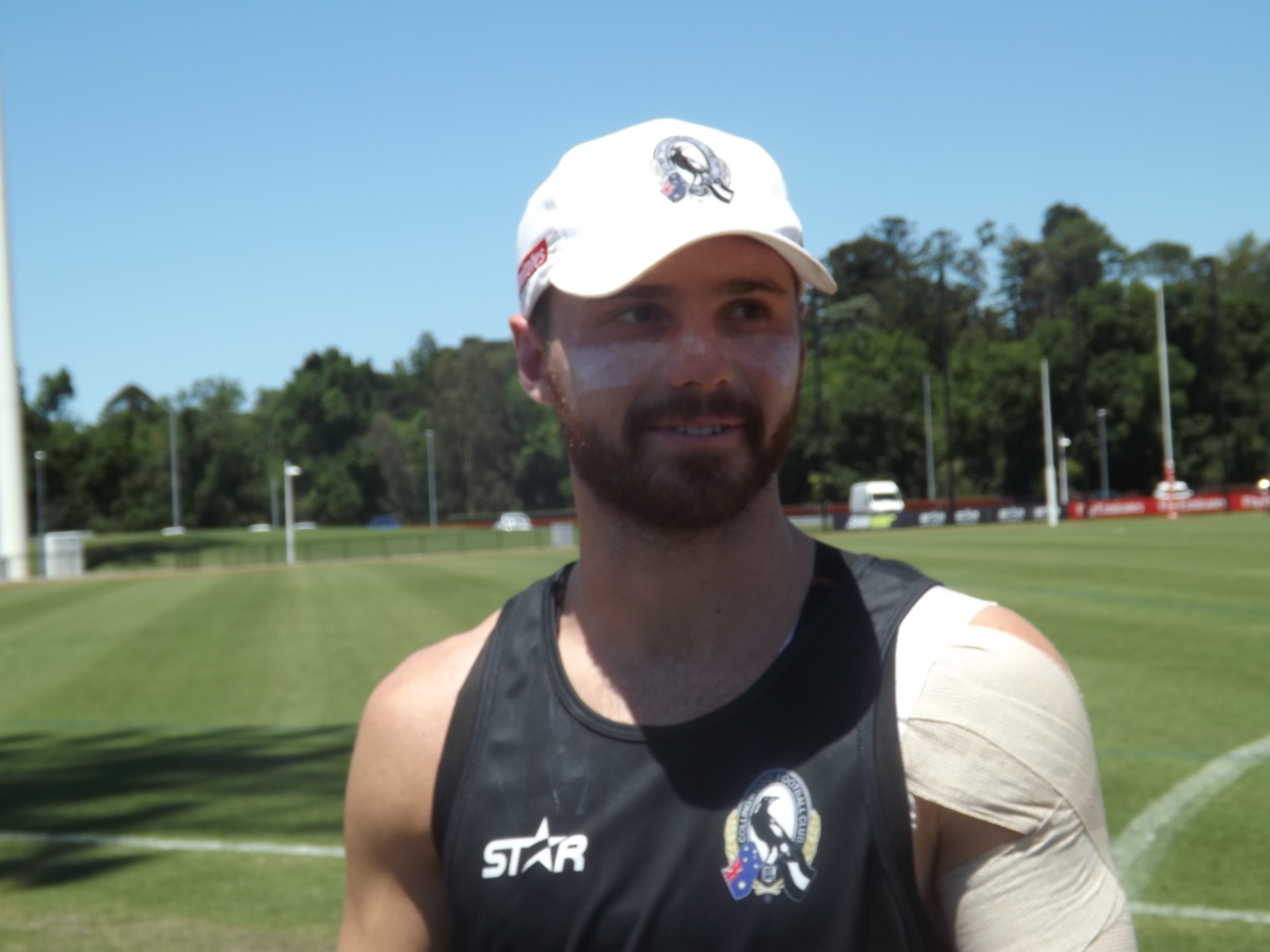
- Sinclair signs autographs with Collingwood in 2014

Personal information
- Full name: Benjamin Sinclair
- Born: 1 October 1991 (age 35)
- Original team: Oakleigh Chargers (TAC Cup)
- Draft: No. 62, 2009 national draft
- Height: 181 cm (5 ft 11 in)
- Weight: 76 kg (168 lb)
- Position: Midfielder

Playing career^{1}
Years	Club	Games (Goals)
2010–2017	Collingwood	63 (22)
- ^{1} Playing statistics correct to the end of 2017.

Career highlights
- 2012 AFL Rising Star nominee

Ben Sinclair is a former professional Australian rules footballer who played for the Collingwood Football Club in the Australian Football League (AFL). A very quick midfielder who represented Vic Metro at the 2009 AFL National Under 18 Championships, he was drafted with the 62nd selection in the 2009 AFL draft from the Oakleigh Chargers in the TAC Cup.

His father, Peter Sinclair played for Melbourne in the late 1960s and his half-brother Will Slade played for Geelong in the early 2000s.

He was awarded the Round 11 2012 AFL Rising Star nomination after kicking three goals and performing well against Melbourne in the Queen's Birthday clash.

He retired from AFL football at the conclusion of the 2017 season.

== Statistics ==
Statistics are correct to the end of the 2017 season

Legend
G	Goals	K	Kicks	D	Disposals	T	Tackles
B	Behinds	H	Handballs	M	Marks

Season	Team	No.	Games	Totals							Averages (per game)						
Season	Team	No.	Games	G	B	K	H	D	M	T	G	B	K	H	D	M	T
2010	Collingwood	28	0	—	—	—	—	—	—	—	—	—	—	—	—	—	—
2011	Collingwood	28	4	2	3	20	25	45	8	12	0.5	0.8	5.0	6.3	11.3	2.0	3.0
2012	Collingwood	28	20	14	11	129	82	211	50	44	0.7	0.6	6.5	4.1	10.6	2.5	2.2
2013	Collingwood	28	15	2	1	100	88	188	44	42	0.1	0.1	6.7	5.9	12.5	2.9	2.8
2014	Collingwood	28	5	2	1	34	39	73	17	7	0.4	0.2	6.8	7.8	14.6	3.4	1.4
2015	Collingwood	28	6	0	1	53	35	88	17	12	0	0.2	8.8	5.8	14.7	2.8	2.0
2016	Collingwood	28	13	2	2	105	94	199	36	30	0.2	0.2	8.1	7.2	15.3	2.8	2.3
2017	Collingwood	28	0	—	—	—	—	—	—	—	—	—	—	—	—	—	—
Career			63	22	19	441	363	804	172	147	0.4	0.3	7.0	5.8	12.8	2.7	2.3
