= Andrew Mitchell (umpire) =

Australian rules football umpire

Personal information
- Full name: Andrew Mitchell
- Nickname: Murph
- Height: 172 cm (5 ft 8 in)
- Weight: 68 kg (150 lb)
- Other occupation: Accountant

Umpiring career
Years	League	Role	Games
2012–	AFL	Field umpire	104

Andrew Mitchell is an Australian rules football umpire currently officiating in the Australian Football League.

He joined the Victorian Football League in 2004, umpiring in the 2009 and '11 Grand Finals. He was appointed to the AFL list in 2012 and made his debut in Round 1 of that year, in a match between the Western Bulldogs and West Coast.
