= Peter Sinclair (footballer) =

Australian rules footballer (born 1947)

Personal information
- Born: 19 May 1947 (age 79)
- Original team: University Blacks
- Height: 179 cm (5 ft 10 in)
- Weight: 80 kg (176 lb)

Playing career^{1}
Years	Club	Games (Goals)
1969–72	Melbourne	34 (18)
- ^{1} Playing statistics correct to the end of 1972.

Peter Sinclair (born 19 May 1947) is a former Australian rules footballer who played with Melbourne in the Victorian Football League (VFL).
