= James Magner =

Australian rules football player (born 1987)

Personal information
- Full name: James Magner
- Born: 12 August 1987 (age 39)
- Original team: Dandenong Stingrays (TAC Cup)
- Draft: No. 42, 2011 AFL draft, Melbourne
- Height: 178 cm (5 ft 10 in)
- Weight: 82 kg (181 lb)
- Position: Midfielder

Club information
- Current club: [[old haileybury Football Club|]]

Playing career^{1}
Years	Club	Games (Goals)
2012–2013	Melbourne	19 (4)
- ^{1} Playing statistics correct to the end of 2013.

Career highlights
- Sandringham Best and Fairest 2011

James Magner (born 12 August 1987) is an Australian rules football player who formerly played professionally at the Melbourne Football Club in the Australian Football League (AFL).

== Early career ==
After playing junior football for the Beaconsfield Football Club, Magner played under 18s football TAC Cup football for the Dandenong Stingrays until 2006, including one season as an over-age player after his 2005 season was limited by injury. He nominated for, but was not recruited in, the AFL National Drafts in 2005 and 2006.

In 2007, Magner joined the Frankston Football Club in the Victorian Football League, where he played until 2009. At Frankston, he made his name as both a tagger, and a hard in-and-under midfielder. In 2010, Magner moved to the Sandringham Football Club, where he played for two seasons. In 2011, he had a breakthrough year in the VFL, winning the Zebras' best and fairest award, and becoming noted as one of the league's top midfielders.

While playing VFL football, Magner made a living as a highway construction worker. He married his wife, Dani, in early 2010. He nominated for the AFL Draft each season throughout his five years in the VFL, but was not recruited.

== Professional career ==
At age 24, Magner was recruited to the Australian Football League by the Melbourne Football Club as a rookie, using a third round selection in the 2011 AFL draft (pick No. 42 overall). He was promoted to the senior list as a nominated rookie prior to the start of the season, and made his AFL debut in Round 1, 2012, against the Brisbane Lions, where he polled two Brownlow votes for his 23 disposals, which featured two goals with his first two kicks. He followed this up with another strong performance against West Coast the next week as one of Melbourne's best, with 32 disposals in a 108-point loss. They were to be his two best performances for the season however, as he, like the team, struggled; he played the first fourteen games of the season, but finished with seventeen games for the year.

In his second season, Magner played only two senior games for the club, spending most of the season with Melbourne's VFL-affiliate, the Casey Scorpions, and he was delisted at the end of the season. He later expressed frustration with the way he was treated by the club in his second season; he believed that his VFL form had warranted regular senior selection, but that the club had already decided it would delist him under youth policy, yet the coaches refused to be up-front and honest with him about its intentions, leaving him confused about whether he had any hopes of senior selection.

== Post-AFL career ==
In 2014, Magner signed with Port Melbourne, his fourth VFL club, where he remained until 2015. In February and March 2015, he played with AFL club Essendon to play in the 2015 NAB Challenge as a top-up player, due to 25 Essendon players withdrawing from the NAB Challenge because of the ongoing Essendon Football Club supplements controversy.
