= Josh Tynan =

Australian rules footballer

Personal information
- Full name: Josh Tynan
- Nickname: Tyno
- Born: 6 November 1993 (age 33)
- Original team: Gippsland Power (TAC Cup)
- Draft: No. 52, 2011 National Draft, Melbourne
- Height: 186 cm (6 ft 1 in)
- Weight: 76 kg (168 lb)
- Position: Defender

Playing career^{1}
Years	Club	Games (Goals)
2012	Melbourne	2 (0)
- ^{1} Playing statistics correct to the end of 2012.

Josh Tynan (born 6 November 1993) is a former professional Australian rules football player who played for the Melbourne Football Club in the Australian Football League (AFL). He was recruited in the 2011 National Draft, with pick #52. Tynan made his debut in Round 1, against the Brisbane Lions.
