= Devon Smith (footballer) =

Australian rules footballer (born 1993)

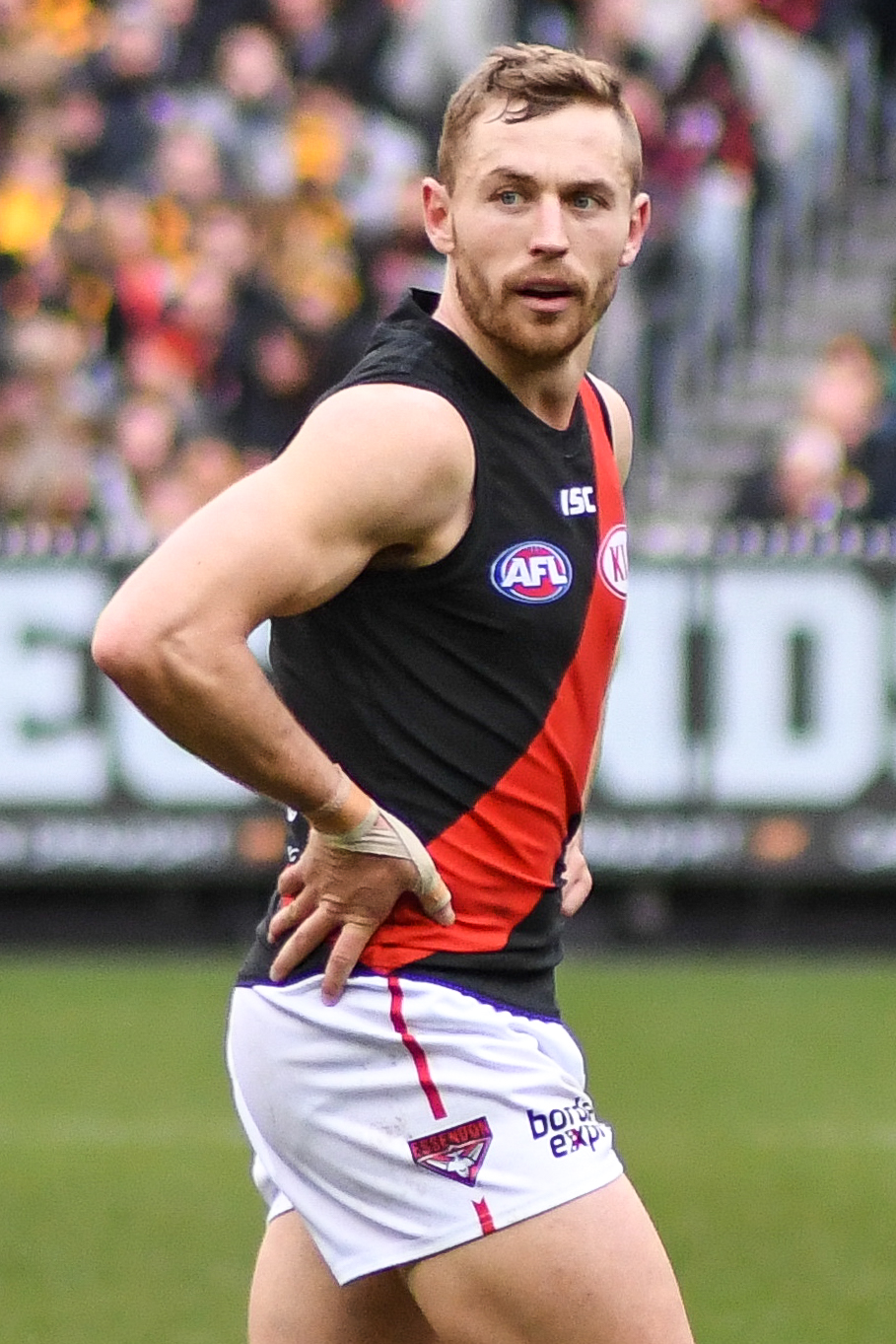
- Smith playing for Essendon in August 2018

Personal information
- Full name: Devon Smith
- Born: 20 May 1993 (age 33)
- Original team: Geelong Falcons (TAC Cup)
- Draft: No. 14, 2011 national draft
- Height: 176 cm (5 ft 9 in)
- Weight: 77 kg (170 lb)
- Position: Midfielder / forward

Playing career
Years	Club	Games (Goals)
2012–2017	Greater Western Sydney	109 (100)
2018–2022	Essendon	73 (46)
Total		182 (146)

Career highlights
- W.S. Crichton Medal: 2018; 22under22 team: 2015; 2012 AFL Rising Star: nominee

Devon Smith (born 20 May 1993) is a former professional Australian rules footballer. Devon played for the Essendon Football Club and GWS Giants in the Australian Football League (AFL).

Smith previously played for Greater Western Sydney from 2012 to 2017. Recruited with the 14th overall pick in the 2011 national draft. He made his debut in the opening round of the 2012 AFL season against Sydney at ANZ Stadium. Prior to being drafted he grew up in the town of Lara, Victoria and attended Geelong Grammar School on a sporting scholarship.

He received a nomination for the 2012 AFL Rising Star after he collected 21 disposals, six tackles, five inside-50s and kicked two goals in a 34-point win against Port Adelaide.

At the conclusion of the 2017 AFL season, Smith requested and was granted a trade to Essendon.

Following the end of season 2018, Smith was awarded the Crichton medal, naming him the best and fairest player for Essendon in his debut season.

Smith only played eight games in the 2022 season, due to constant knee injuries. On 12 August, Smith announced his retirement.

== Statistics ==
Legend
G	Goals	K	Kicks	D	Disposals	T	Tackles
B	Behinds	H	Handballs	M	Marks
†	Led the league for the season

Season	Team	No.	Games	Totals							Averages (per game)						
Season	Team	No.	Games	G	B	K	H	D	M	T	G	B	K	H	D	M	T
2012	Greater Western Sydney	34	20	10	19	174	144	318	61	85	0.5	0.9	8.7	7.2	15.9	3.0	4.2
2013	Greater Western Sydney	10	18	16	11	181	114	295	49	81	0.9	0.6	10.1	6.3	16.4	2.7	4.5
2014	Greater Western Sydney	10	21	26	15	286	166	452	89	95	1.2	0.7	13.6	7.9	21.5	4.2	4.5
2015	Greater Western Sydney	10	20	17	20	242	140	382	70	98	0.8	1.0	12.1	7.0	19.1	3.5	4.9
2016	Greater Western Sydney	10	14	16	18	132	130	262	40	66	1.1	1.3	9.4	9.3	18.7	2.9	4.7
2017	Greater Western Sydney	10	16	15	14	158	138	296	51	79	0.9	0.9	9.9	8.6	18.5	3.2	4.9
2018	Essendon	5	22	17	16	290	194	484	83	186^{†}	0.8	0.7	13.2	8.8	22.0	3.8	8.5^{†}
2019	Essendon	5	7	3	2	79	48	127	19	40	0.4	0.3	11.3	6.9	18.1	2.7	5.7
2020	Essendon	5	16	7	7	158	133	291	40	61	0.4	0.4	9.9	8.3	18.2	2.5	3.8
2021	Essendon	5	20	16	19	155	128	283	68	78	0.8	1.0	7.8	6.4	14.2	3.4	3.9
2022	Essendon	5	8	3	8	47	31	78	9	21	0.4	1.0	5.9	3.9	9.8	1.1	2.6
Career			182	146	149	1902	1366	3268	579	891	0.8	0.8	10.5	7.5	18.0	3.2	4.9
