= Mitch Wallis =

Australian rules footballer

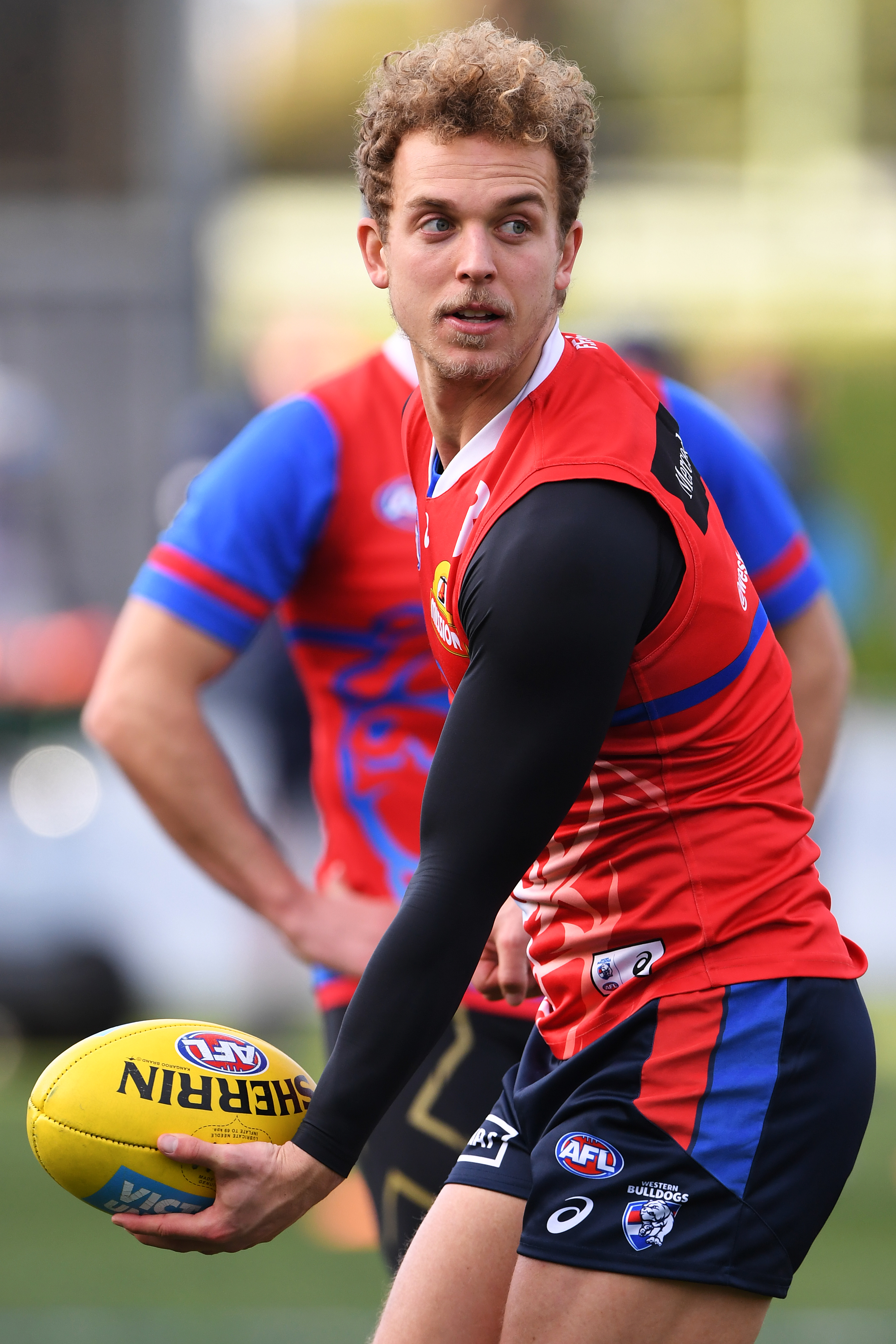
- Wallis in August 2018

Personal information
- Full name: Mitchell Wallis
- Born: 24 October 1992 (age 34)
- Original team: Calder Cannons (TAC Cup)
- Draft: No. 22 (F/S), 2010 national draft
- Height: 186 cm (6 ft 1 in)
- Weight: 86 kg (190 lb)
- Position: Midfielder / Full-forward

Club information
- Current club: Western Bulldogs
- Number: 3

Playing career^{1}
Years	Club	Games (Goals)
2011–2022	Western Bulldogs	162 (107)
- ^{1} Playing statistics correct to the end of round 12, 2022.

Career highlights
- Western Bulldogs leading goalkicker: 2020; 2012 AFL Rising Star nominee

Mitchell Wallis (born 24 October 1992) is an Australian rules footballer who last played for the Western Bulldogs in the Australian Football League (AFL). He is the son of former Bulldogs legend Stephen Wallis.

Originally from Melbourne, Victoria, and graduating from St Kevin's College in 2010, Wallis was drafted to the Bulldogs from the Calder Cannons in the TAC Cup with the 22nd selection in the 2010 AFL draft as a father–son selection, after Port Adelaide nominated their intention to draft him with first-round pick (pick 16) if available.

== Early football ==
He captained Vic Metro in the 2010 NAB AFL Under-18 Championships, where he averaged 28 disposals at 83 per cent efficiency in three matches before being injured. He also captained his school's (St Kevin's College) First XVIII team, and represented them at the APS vs AGS representative game. In prior years, he played junior football for St Bernard’s Football Club in the Western Region Football League.

In the 2010 TAC Cup Grand Final, he had 47 disposals and was awarded best on ground, in the Cannons 58 point defeat of Gippsland Power.

== AFL career ==
He made his AFL debut for the Bulldogs in Round 5 of the 2011 AFL season against Fremantle at Patersons Stadium, as the substitute player, replacing Tom Williams at three-quarter time. In round 4 of the 2012 AFL season, Wallis received a nomination for the 2012 AFL Rising Star.

On 23 July 2016, Wallis suffered a leg injury in which he kicked the lower part of his left leg with his right foot while being tackled by Shane Savage midway through the final quarter of the Western Bulldogs' 15-point loss to St Kilda, causing both the tibia and fibula to break. The injury ended his season, and he subsequently missed out on the club's premiership win in October.

In 2021, Wallis served as the Bulldogs' vice-captain under Marcus Bontempelli.

== Statistics ==
Statistics are correct to the end of round 6, 2022

Legend
G	Goals	K	Kicks	D	Disposals	T	Tackles
B	Behinds	H	Handballs	M	Marks

Season	Team	No.	Games	Totals							Averages (per game)							Votes
Season	Team	No.	Games	G	B	K	H	D	M	T	G	B	K	H	D	M	T	Votes
2011	Western Bulldogs	3	6	0	2	34	38	72	17	25	0.0	0.3	5.7	6.3	12.0	2.8	4.2	0
2012	Western Bulldogs	3	19	7	3	167	257	424	68	79	0.4	0.2	8.8	13.5	22.3	3.6	4.2	0
2013	Western Bulldogs	3	18	6	1	140	192	332	28	89	0.3	0.1	7.8	10.7	18.4	1.6	4.9	0
2014	Western Bulldogs	3	13	2	2	77	137	214	19	57	0.2	0.2	5.9	10.5	16.5	1.5	4.4	0
2015	Western Bulldogs	3	20	15	13	205	263	468	66	95	0.8	0.7	10.3	13.2	23.4	3.3	4.8	8
2016	Western Bulldogs	3	17	11	6	155	233	388	45	57	0.7	0.4	9.1	13.7	22.8	2.7	3.4	5
2017	Western Bulldogs	3	12	7	5	86	162	248	37	43	0.6	0.4	7.2	13.5	20.7	3.1	3.6	0
2018	Western Bulldogs	3	18	20	3	143	242	385	59	71	1.1	0.2	7.9	13.4	21.4	3.3	3.9	0
2019	Western Bulldogs	3	10	8	5	99	119	218	36	27	0.8	0.5	9.9	11.9	21.8	3.6	2.7	2
2020 (Note: The 2020 season was played with 17 home-and-away matches per team (down from 22) and 16-minute quarters with time on (down from 20-minute quarters with time on) due to the impact of the COVID-19 pandemic.)	Western Bulldogs	3	18	25	14	83	83	166	42	32	1.4	0.8	4.6	4.6	9.2	2.3	1.8	2
2021	Western Bulldogs	3	6	4	2	28	33	61	20	10	0.7	0.3	4.7	5.5	10.2	3.3	1.7	0
2022	Western Bulldogs	3	5	2	3	12	8	20	6	5	0.7	1.0	4.0	2.7	6.7	2.0	1.7	0
Career			162	107	59	1229	1767	2996	443	590	0.7	0.4	7.7	11.0	18.7	2.8	3.7	17

== Honours and achievements ==
- Junior
  - Best on Ground — TAC cup Grand Final : 2010
  - TAC Cup premiers — Calder Cannons : 2009, 2010
