= David Harris (umpire) =

Australian rules football umpire

Personal information
- Full name: David Harris
- Nicknames: Harro, Spud
- Height: 180 cm (5 ft 11 in)
- Weight: 72 kg (159 lb)
- Other occupation: Sports administrator

Umpiring career
Years	League	Role	Games
2012–2022	AFL	Field umpire	91

David Harris is a former Australian rules football umpire officiating in the Australian Football League between 2012 and 2022.

He joined the Victorian Football League in 2007, umpiring in the 2012 Grand Final. He was appointed to the AFL list in 2012 and made his debut in Round 18 of that year, in a match between North Melbourne and Melbourne. He retired from the AFL in 2022, his number (24) being replaced by Tom Bryce in 2023.
