= Jonathan Giles =

Australian rules footballer

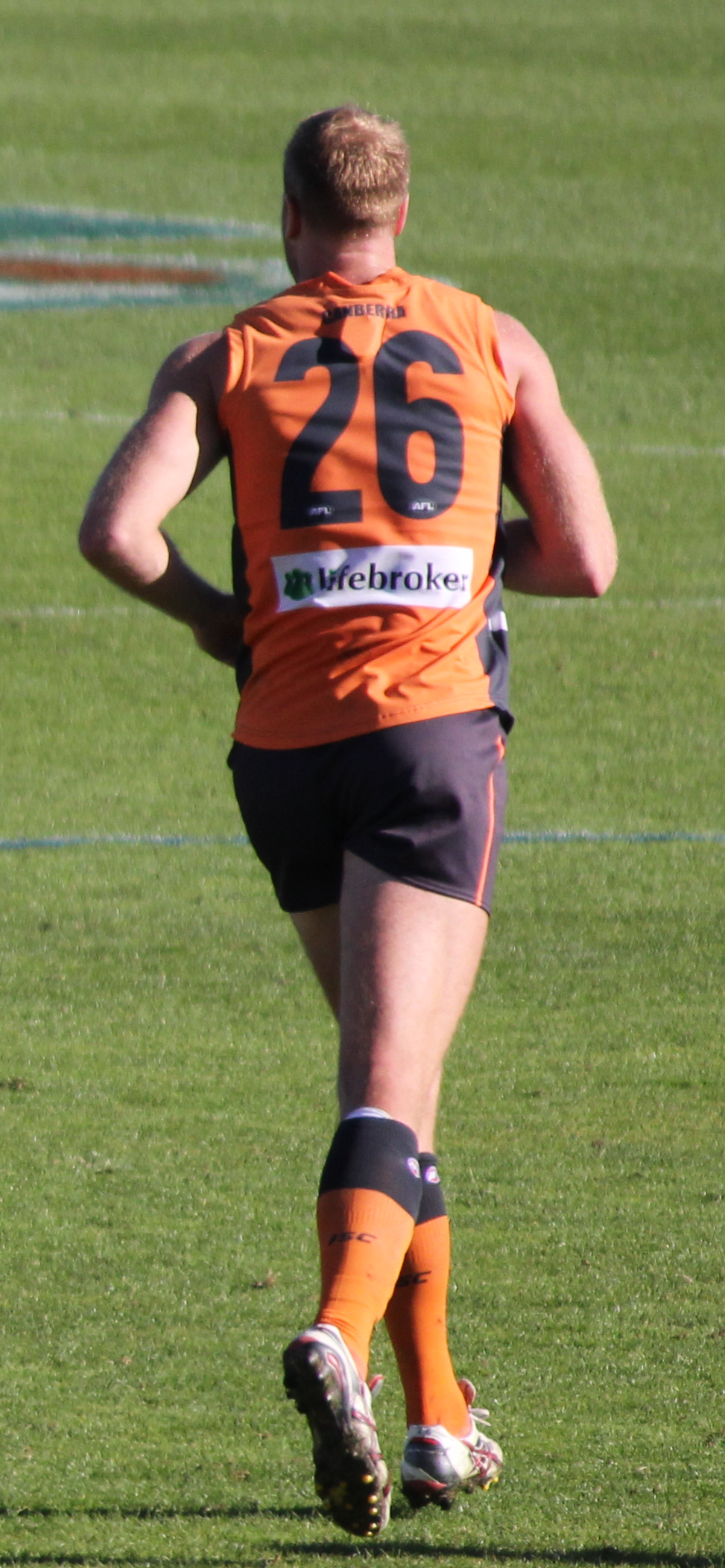

Personal information
- Full name: Jonathan Giles
- Nickname: Joffa
- Born: 8 January 1988 (age 38)
- Original team: Central District
- Draft: 70th overall, 2005 National Draft; 3rd overall, 2011 Rookie Draft
- Height: 201 cm (6 ft 7 in)
- Weight: 101 kg (223 lb)
- Position: Ruckman

Playing career
Years	Club	Games (Goals)
2006–2009	Port Adelaide	0 (0)
2012–2014	Greater Western Sydney	51 (39)
2015	Essendon	3 (1)
2016–2017	West Coast	9 (3)
Total		63 (43)

Career highlights
- Sturt best and fairest 2010; Central District premiership 2008, 2009; East Perth leading goal kicker 2016

Jonathan Giles (born 8 January 1988) is a former professional Australian rules footballer who played for the Greater Western Sydney Giants, Essendon Football Club and West Coast Eagles in the Australian Football League (AFL). He was listed with the Port Adelaide Football Club from 2006 to 2009, but did not play a senior game for the club. He returned to the AFL with expansion club Greater Western Sydney, making his debut in round 1 of the 2012 season. Giles moved on to Essendon for the 2015 season, and then spent two years with West Coast before retiring due to a degenerative knee condition. In total, he played 63 AFL games.

== AFL career ==
=== Port Adelaide (2006–09) ===
Giles was recruited in the 2005 AFL draft, from Central District in the South Australian National Football League (SANFL) at pick number 70, but never played a game for Port Adelaide in the AFL.

During the 2006 season, he played 19 games for Central District's reserves team, kicking four goals. Also in 2006, Giles played in the London exhibition match against Geelong. In a spiteful match, he kicked one goal.

Giles was delisted by Port on 16 October 2009. In December 2010, after winning the best and fairest award for Sturt in the SANFL, Giles was selected by the new Greater Western Sydney Giants in the 2011 Rookie Draft.

=== Greater Western Sydney (2012–14) ===
Giles played the 2011 season for Greater Western Sydney in the North East Australian Football League, as one of the senior players on an otherwise young squad. He played his first official AFL game against the Sydney Swans in 2012, where he kicked one goal. In Round 8, 2014, Giles became the first Giants player to notch up 50 games for the club, the Giants lost to the West Coast Eagles by 111 points.

=== Essendon (2015) ===
On 16 October 2014, Giles was traded to the Essendon Football Club after struggling to maintain his place in the Greater Western Sydney team throughout the 2014 season. In round 18 in the 2015 season, Giles made his debut for Essendon in an 87-point loss to the Western Bulldogs.

=== West Coast (2016) ===
In October 2015, Giles was traded to the West Coast Eagles.

As of the end of the 2016 season, Giles has the lowest winning percentage for any current player in the AFL, playing in only eight wins from 58 career games.

Giles managed five more games during the 2017 season, due to injuries to first-choice ruckmen Nic Naitanui and Scott Lycett. He retired at the end of the season due to a degenerative knee condition.

== Statistics ==
Statistics are correct to the end of the 2017 season

Legend
G	Goals	K	Kicks	D	Disposals	T	Tackles
B	Behinds	H	Handballs	M	Marks	H/O	Hit-outs

Season	Team	No.	Games	Totals								Averages (per game)							
Season	Team	No.	Games	G	B	K	H	D	M	T	H/O	G	B	K	H	D	M	T	H/O
2012	Greater Western Sydney	26	20	18	8	177	108	285	70	43	442	0.9	0.4	8.9	5.4	14.3	3.5	2.2	22.1
2013	Greater Western Sydney	26	22	14	6	160	71	231	30	46	535	0.6	0.3	7.3	3.2	10.5	1.4	2.1	24.3
2014	Greater Western Sydney	26	9	7	4	53	22	75	8	24	213	0.8	0.4	5.9	2.4	8.3	0.9	2.7	23.7
2015	Essendon	27	3	1	2	27	9	36	5	7	67	0.3	0.7	9.0	3.0	12.0	1.7	2.3	22.3
2016	West Coast	22	4	2	1	21	14	35	10	10	92	0.5	0.3	5.3	3.5	8.8	2.5	2.5	23.0
2017	West Coast	22	5	1	2	19	20	39	6	15	109	0.2	0.4	3.8	4.0	7.8	1.2	3.0	21.8
Career			63	43	23	457	244	701	129	145	1458	0.7	0.4	7.3	3.9	11.1	2.0	2.3	23.1
