= Sam Blease =

Australian rules footballer (born 1991)

Personal information
- Full name: Sam Blease
- Nickname: Bleasey Blicka
- Born: 19 February 1991 (age 35)
- Original teams: Norwood Football Club (Victoria), Eastern Ranges (TAC Cup)
- Draft: No. 17 (PP), 2008 National Draft, Melbourne
- Height: 184 cm (6 ft 0 in)
- Weight: 80 kg (176 lb)
- Position: Midfielder

Playing career^{1}
Years	Club	Games (Goals)
2011–2014	Melbourne	33 (25)
2015	Geelong	1 (0)
Total		34 (25)
- ^{1} Playing statistics correct to the end of 2015.

Career highlights
- 2× AFL Rising Star nominee: 2011, 2012

Sam Blease (born 19 February 1991) is a former professional Australian rules footballer who played for the Melbourne Football Club and Geelong Football Club in the Australian Football League (AFL).

Selected by Melbourne with pick 17 in the 2008 AFL draft, he previously played with the Eastern Ranges in the TAC Cup, represented the under-18 Vic metro side in 2008 and is an AIS/AFL Academy graduate.

Blease suffered a setback in his first year with the Demons when he broke his leg, ruling him out for majority of the 2009 season.

He was nominated for the 2011 AFL Rising Star after his round 23 performance against Gold Coast.

Blease kicked a career high five goals against the Saints in round 20 of the 2012 AFL season, for this he was nominated for the 2012 AFL Rising Star, becoming only the ninth player to be nominated in two different seasons.

Blease struggled to break into the senior side during 2014, due to the defensive nature of Paul Roos' coaching. He was called into the side for round 18 against Port Adelaide and retained his position to play against Brisbane Lions the next week. He was dropped after the Brisbane game and requested to be traded from the club at the end of the season, however, was unable to find a new home. He was officially delisted on 22 October 2014. On 3 November 2014, Blease joined the Geelong Football Club as a delisted free agent. He announced his immediate retirement from the AFL on 31 August 2015 after failing to recover from a serious head knock during a VFL match against Essendon on 25 July.

== Statistics ==
Statistics are correct to the end of the 2015 season

Legend
G	Goals	K	Kicks	D	Disposals	T	Tackles
B	Behinds	H	Handballs	M	Marks

Season	Team	No.	Games	Totals							Averages (per game)						
Season	Team	No.	Games	G	B	K	H	D	M	T	G	B	K	H	D	M	T
2009	Melbourne	46	0	—	—	—	—	—	—	—	—	—	—	—	—	—	—
2010	Melbourne	46	0	—	—	—	—	—	—	—	—	—	—	—	—	—	—
2011	Melbourne	46	5	0	2	48	26	74	10	5	0.0	0.4	9.6	5.2	14.8	2.0	1.0
2012	Melbourne	17	16	19	13	136	65	201	44	33	1.2	0.8	8.5	4.1	12.6	2.8	2.1
2013	Melbourne	17	10	5	4	56	19	75	13	13	0.5	0.4	5.6	1.9	7.5	1.3	1.3
2014	Melbourne	17	2	1	2	16	5	21	3	4	0.5	1.0	8.0	2.5	10.5	1.5	2.0
2015	Geelong	12	1	0	0	4	3	7	2	0	0.0	0.0	4.0	3.0	7.0	2.0	0.0
Career			34	25	21	260	118	378	72	55	0.7	0.6	7.7	3.5	11.2	2.1	1.6
