= Jared Rivers =

Australian rules footballer, born 1984

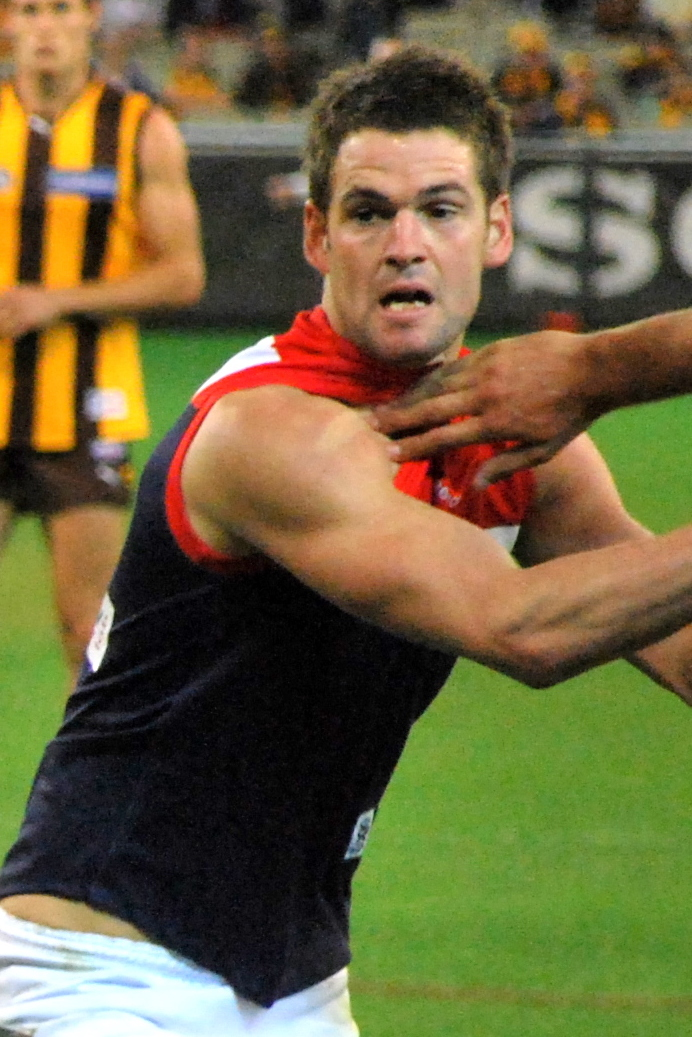
- Rivers with Melbourne in 2009

Personal information
- Full name: Jared Rivers
- Born: 18 October 1984 (age 42)
- Original team: North Adelaide (SANFL)
- Draft: 1. 26, 2002 National draft, Melbourne
- Height: 192 cm (6 ft 4 in)
- Weight: 92 kg (203 lb)
- Position: Defender

Playing career^{1}
Years	Club	Games (Goals)
2003–2012	Melbourne	150 (18)
2013–2015	Geelong	44 (0)
Total		194 (18)
- ^{1} Playing statistics correct to the end of 2015.

Career highlights
- 1 x Spencer Gulf Football League Premiership Player 2000: AFL Rising Star 2004

Jared Rivers (born 18 October 1984) is a former Australian rules footballer who played for the Melbourne Football Club and Geelong Football Club in the Australian Football League (AFL).

== Junior career ==
As a child Rivers supported the Sydney Swans, and cites Tony Lockett and Paul Kelly as his childhood heroes. He attended Caritas College until Year 10 and Sacred Heart College Senior, Adelaide afterwards.

He played junior football for the South Augusta Bulldogs Football club. He won a premiership with the club in 2000 at the age of 15, playing in the Spencer Gulf League. He was spotted by North Adelaide Football Club and began playing seniors under coach Darel Hart.

He was considered as a potential top ten draft pick, and was selected to play for South Australia's Under 18 team in the National competition. He injured his wrist in the lead up to this match, but scouts from the Melbourne Demons nonetheless selected him as the 27th pick overall in the 2002 AFL draft.

== Senior career ==
=== Melbourne ===
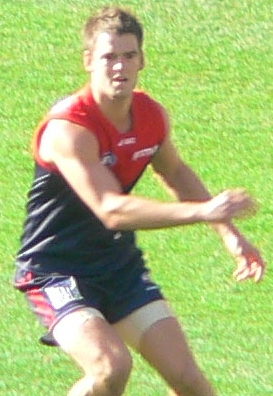
Rivers with Melbourne in 2007

Rivers played three games in his debut season, but was praised for his job on Port Adelaide's Warren Tredrea in his second match.

After a good performance in the preseason, Rivers won a place in the first team, and was subsequently nominated for Round 3 of National Bank Rising Star in 2004. He continued his good form throughout the season right until the Demons' loss to Essendon in the Elimination Final. In the week leading up to the Final, he was awarded the 2004 Rising Star award, chosen unanimously by the nine judges.

His season in 2005 was less successful, with poor form and injury culminating in him being dropped to the Sandringham team towards the end of the season. He was also suspended for two matches after striking Hawthorn's Ben Dixon.

Rivers returned to form the following season, becoming the premier defender of Melbourne Football Club, and playing his 50th career game against Port Adelaide at the MCG in Round 13.

Rivers is considered a master of the one percenter. He was able to move forward on many occasions in the 2006 season, including the Queens Birthday Match when he kicked his first two goals in AFL football.

Rivers was injured at the beginning of the 2007 season, and had little time on the field, suffering from a potentially season-threatening groin injury.

In 2008 Rivers was injured again, with a torn abdominal against the Magpies in the annual Queens Birthday match.

=== Geelong ===
On 18 October 2012, Rivers, an unrestricted free agent under the AFL's new free agency system, signed a 2-year contract with the Geelong Football Club. In August 2015, he announced his retirement from the AFL due to chronic knee problems.

== Post-football career ==
Two months after his retirement, Rivers joined Collingwood's coaching staff as a development coach, replacing Craig McRae as part of a coaching restructure.

A year after joining Collingwood's coaching staff, Rivers was appointed coach of the VFL team, after Dale Tapping left to take up a role as an assistant coach with the Brisbane Lions. Rivers coached the VFL team until the end of the 2019 season.

in August 2020, Rivers joined Collegians Football Club in the VAFA as their head coach.

source https:″//www.vafa.com.au/news/2023/09/24/lions-roar-to-the-2023-premiership/, https://www.vafa.com.au/news/2023/09/09/a-memorable-start-to-september-the-lions-are-uncaged/'

== Statistics ==
Legend
G	Goals	K	Kicks	D	Disposals	T	Tackles
B	Behinds	H	Handballs	M	Marks

Season	Team	No.	Games	Totals							Averages (per game)						
Season	Team	No.	Games	G	B	K	H	D	M	T	G	B	K	H	D	M	T
2003	Melbourne	27	3	0	0	4	1	5	2	8	0.0	0.0	1.3	0.3	1.7	0.7	2.7
2004	Melbourne	27	22	0	0	130	129	259	109	49	0.0	0.0	5.9	5.9	11.8	5.0	2.2
2005	Melbourne	27	14	0	0	98	66	164	79	23	0.0	0.0	7.0	4.7	11.7	5.6	1.6
2006	Melbourne	27	22	4	4	166	129	295	118	58	0.2	0.2	7.5	5.9	13.4	5.4	2.6
2007	Melbourne	27	3	0	0	17	22	39	16	8	0.0	0.0	5.7	7.3	13.0	5.3	2.7
2008	Melbourne	27	6	0	1	28	38	66	23	9	0.0	0.2	4.7	6.3	11.0	3.8	1.5
2009	Melbourne	27	20	0	0	113	108	221	86	63	0.0	0.0	5.7	5.4	11.1	4.3	3.2
2010	Melbourne	27	18	0	1	142	94	236	106	44	0.0	0.1	7.9	5.2	13.1	5.9	2.4
2011	Melbourne	27	20	1	1	130	143	273	88	51	0.1	0.1	6.5	7.2	13.7	4.4	2.6
2012	Melbourne	27	22	13	10	171	111	282	109	41	0.6	0.5	7.8	5.0	12.8	5.0	1.9
2013	Geelong	25	10	0	2	50	53	103	26	24	0.0	0.2	5.0	5.3	10.3	2.6	2.4
2014	Geelong	25	22	0	1	157	128	285	125	47	0.0	0.0	7.1	5.8	13.0	5.7	2.1
2015	Geelong	25	12	0	0	99	66	165	77	25	0.0	0.0	8.3	5.5	13.8	6.4	2.1
Career			194	18	20	1305	1088	2393	964	450	0.1	0.1	6.7	5.6	12.3	5.0	2.3
