= 2009 Melbourne Football Club season =

Melbourne Football Club
2009 season
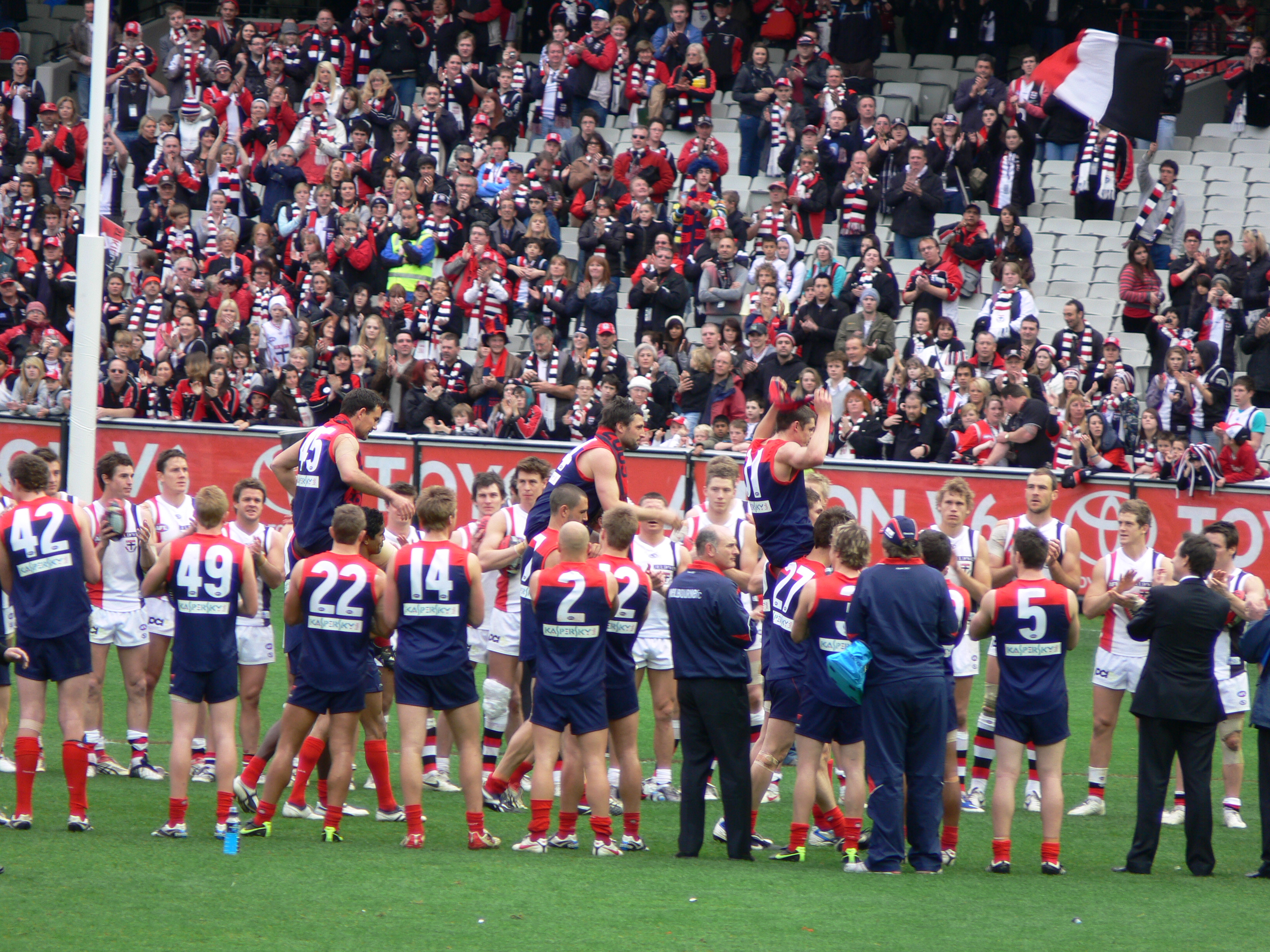
- Melbourne vs St Kilda 2009
- President: Jim Stynes^{(2nd season)}
- Coach: Dean Bailey^{(2nd season)}
- Captains: James McDonald^{(2nd season)}
- Home grounds: MCG^{(100,018 capacity)}
- Pre-season: First round
- AFL season: 16th
- Finals series: DNQ
- Best and fairest: Aaron Davey
- Leading goalkicker: Russell Robertson^{(29 goals)}
- Highest home attendance: 61,287^{(round 11 vs. Collingwood)}
- Lowest home attendance: 7,311^{(round 17 vs. Sydney)}
- Average home attendance: 27,570
- Club membership: 31,506^{(▲1,887 / ▲6.37%)}

The 2009 Melbourne Football Club season was the club's 110th year in the VFL/AFL since it began in 1897.

Melbourne hosted 10 of its 11 home games at the MCG. For the third year in a row, they played their remaining home game at Manuka Oval in the nation's capital, Canberra, against the Sydney Swans during Round 17. Dean Bailey coached his second year as senior coach at Melbourne. After taking the captaincy from David Neitz in round 6 the year before with Cameron Bruce, James McDonald was made full-time captain for the season.

On 2 August, Melbourne president Jim Stynes announced he was diagnosed with cancer and would be stepping aside from his duties until the conclusion of the 2009 AFL season. Don McLardy took over as acting president for that period of time.

Melbourne continued their Debt Demolition campaign in the month of August raising $567,132 and cutting their debt to $1.5 million. Melbourne also had a yearly profit of $587,183.

Melbourne only won four matches for the year, receiving their 12th wooden spoon. Melbourne came under scrutiny in the later rounds of the season (most notably in round 18 against Richmond) for "tanking", i.e. losing games in order to receive a priority draft pick; but, after extensive investigations in 2012 and 2013, the AFL found the club not guilty of these allegations. Because the Demons won four games or fewer for the second year in a row, the club received a priority pick at the start of the 2009 National Draft.

== 2009 list changes ==
=== Retirements and delistings ===
Player	New club	League	Reason
David Neitz	Unknown	Unknown	Retired
Ben Holland	Unknown	Unknown	Retired
Isaac Weetra	Port Adelaide Magpies	SANFL	Delisted
Jace Bode	Norwood	SANFL	Delisted
Adem Yze	Box Hill Hawks	VFL	Delisted
Jeff White	Redland	QAFL	Delisted
Chris Johnson	Carlton	AFL	Delisted

=== National draft ===
Round	Overall pick	Player	State	Position	Team from	League from
1	1	Jack Watts	(Victoria (state))	Forward	Sandringham Dragons	TAC Cup
Priority	17	Sam Blease	(Victoria (state))	Midfield	Eastern Ranges	TAC Cup
2	19	James Strauss	(Victoria (state))	Forward	Oakleigh Chargers	TAC Cup
3	35	Jamie Bennell	(Western Australia)	Utility	Swan Districts	WAFL
4	51	Neville Jetta	(Western Australia)	Defender	Swan Districts	WAFL
5	64	Rohan Bail	(Queensland)	Defender	Mount Gravatt	QAFL

=== Pre-season draft ===
Round	Overall pick	Player	State	Position	Team from	League from
1	1	Liam Jurrah	(Northern Territory)	Forward	Yuendemu; Nightcliff	CAFL; NTFL

=== Rookie draft ===
Round	Overall pick	Player	State	Position	Team from	League from
1	1	Jordie McKenzie	(Victoria (state))	Midfield	Geelong Falcons	TAC Cup
2	17	Rhys Healey	(Victoria (state))	Forward/Midfield	Bendigo Pioneers	TAC Cup
3	33	Daniel Hughes	(Victoria (state))	Forward	Melbourne	AFL

== 2009 squad ==
Melbourne Football Club
Senior list		Rookie List	Coaching staff
1 Simon Buckley; 2 Nathan Jones; 3 Clint Bartram; 4 Jack Watts; 5 Jordan Gysberts; 6 Matthew Bate; 7 Brad Miller; 8 James Frawley; 10 Cale Morton; 11 Paul Johnson; 12 Colin Sylvia; 14 Lynden Dunn; 15 Ricky Petterd; 16 Jack Grimes; 18 Brad Green; 19 Addam Maric; 20 Colin Garland; 21 Daniel Bell; 22 Brent Moloney; 23 James McDonald (c); 24 Russell Robertson	25 Kyle Cheney; 26 John Meesen; 27 Jared Rivers; 28 Isaac Weetra; 29 Michael Newton; 30 Tom McNamara; 31 Paul Wheatley; 32 Cameron Bruce (vc); 33 Austin Wonaeamirri; 34 Stefan Martin; 35 Trent Zomer; 36 Aaron Davey; 37 Matthew Warnock; 39 Neville Jetta; 40 Mark Jamar; 41 Rohan Bail; 43 Jamie Bennell; 45 Matthew Whelan; 46 Sam Blease; 47 James Strauss; 48 Liam Jurrah	38 Daniel Hughes; 42 Jake Spencer; 44 Shane Valenti; 49 Jordie McKenzie; 50 Rhys Healey	Head coach: Dean Bailey; Assistant coaches: Josh Mahoney (forward coach); Anthony Rock (midfield coach); Sean Wellman (defensive coach); Mark Williams (development coach); Legend: (c) Captain(s); (vc) Vice-captain(s)

== 2009 season ==
=== Pre-season ===
==== NAB Cup and NAB Challenge ====
===== Week 1 =====
Round 1
Saturday, 21 February (4:10 pm)	Hawthorn	def.	Melbourne	York Park (crowd: 8,122)	Report
0.4.0 (24); 0.5.1 (31); 0.5.2 (32); 0.11.3 (69)	Q1; Q2; Q3; Final	0.4.5 (29); 0.5.6 (36); 1.8.8 (65); 1.8.9 (66)	Television broadcast: None

==== Practice Matches ====
===== Week 2 =====
Week 2
Saturday, 28 February (1:00 pm)	Melbourne	def. by	Sydney	Visy Park (crowd: 3,000 est.)	Report
8.7 (55)	Q1; Q2; Q3; Final	9.9 (63)	Television broadcast: None

===== Week 3 =====
Week 3
Friday, 6 March (7.30 pm)	Brisbane Lions	def. by	Melbourne	Cazaly's Stadium (crowd: 4,000 est.)	Report
4.12 (36)	Q1; Q2; Q3; Final	11.7 (73)	Television broadcast: None

===== Week 4 =====
Week 4
Saturday, 14 March (2.00 pm)	Melbourne	def. by	Western Bulldogs	Casey Fields (crowd: 2,500 est.)	Report
10.3 (63)	Q1; Q2; Q3; Final	14.17 (101)	Television broadcast: None

=== Home and away season ===
==== Round 1 ====
Round 1
Sunday, 29 March (1:10 pm)	Melbourne	def. by	North Melbourne	MCG (crowd: 28,707)	Report
3.3 (21); 6.5 (41); 9.6 (60); 10.7 (67)	Q1; Q2; Q3; Final	3.3 (21); 7.6 (48); 11.8 (74); 15.11 (101)	Television broadcast: Foxtel
Green 2, Petterd 2, Bate, Davey, Jetta, Johnson, Moloney, Morton	Goals	McIntosh 3, Campbell 2, Petrie 2, Thomas 2, Firrito, Hale, Harding, Harvey, McMahon, Simpson
Debut(s): Jamie Bennell, Kyle Cheney, Neville Jetta, Jake Spencer; Milestone(s): Neville Jetta (1st AFL Goal); Brownlow Votes: Hamish McIntosh (North Melbourne) 3 votes, Leigh Harding (North Melbourne) 2 votes, Nathan Jones (Melbourne) 1 vote Record: 0 Wins, 1 Loss, 0 Draws (66.34%); Ladder Position: 13th

==== Round 2 ====
Round 2
Saturday, 4 April (2:10 pm)	Collingwood	def.	Melbourne	MCG (crowd: 43,169)	Report
3.1 (19); 8.3 (51); 14.7 (91); 17.15 (117)	Q1; Q2; Q3; Final	5.2 (32); 7.2 (44); 9.4 (58); 10.4 (64)	Television broadcast: Network Ten
Anthony 4, Didak 3, Cloke 2, Lockyer 2, Brown, Davis, Fraser, Beams, Medhurst, Swan	Goals	Green 3, Bruce, Johnson, Bate, McLean, Miller, Morton, Petterd
Milestone(s): Matthew Bate (50th AFL Game); Brownlow Votes: Josh Fraser (Collingwood) 3 votes, Alan Didak (Collingwood) 2 votes, Aaron Davey (Melbourne) 1 vote Record: 0 Wins, 2 Losses, 0 Draws (60.1%); Ladder Position: 15th

==== Round 3 ====
Round 3
Sunday, 11 April (12:40 pm)	Port Adelaide	def.	Melbourne	AAMI Stadium (crowd: 21,030)	Report
3.3 (21); 10.5 (65); 16.12 (108); 22. 15 (147)	Q1; Q2; Q3; Final	2.1 (13); 4.4 (28); 7.5 (47); 14.6 (90)	Television broadcast: Foxtel
Debut(s): John Meesen; Milestone(s): Aaron Davey (100th AFL Game) Jamie Bennell (1st AFL Goal); Brownlow Votes: Warren Tredrea (Port Adelaide) 3 votes, Daniel Motlop (Port Adelaide) 2 votes, Danyle Pearce (Port Adelaide) 1 vote Record: 0 Wins, 3 Losses, 0 Draws (60.5%); Ladder Position: 15th

==== Round 4 ====
Round 4
Sunday, 19 April (2:10 pm)	Richmond	def. by	Melbourne	MCG (crowd: 40,765)	Report
2.3 (15); 5.6 (36); 9.7 (61); 13.14 (92)	Q1; Q2; Q3; Final	2.6 (18); 10.7 (67); 13.11 (89); 14.16 (100)	Television broadcast: Seven Network
Brownlow Votes:Matthew Richardson (Richmond) 3 votes, Aaron Davey (Melbourne) 2 votes, Brock McLean (Melbourne) 1 vote Record: 1 Win, 3 Losses, 0 Draws(70.2%); Ladder Position: 14th

==== Round 5 ====
Round 5
Sunday, 26 April (2:10 pm)	Melbourne	def. by	Adelaide	MCG (crowd: 14,129)	Report
0.1 (1); 0.3 (3); 1.6 (12); 4.10 (34)	Q1; Q2; Q3; Final	2.4 (16); 4.6 (30); 5.7 (37); 7.9 (51)	Television broadcast: Foxtel
Brownlow Votes: Simon Goodwin (Adelaide) 3 votes, Ben Rutten (Adelaide) 2 votes, Bernie Vince (Adelaide) 1 vote Record: 1 Win, 4 Losses, 0 Draws (69.9%); Ladder Position: 15th

==== Round 6 ====
Round 6
Sunday, 3 May (2:10 pm)	Melbourne	def. by	Geelong	MCG (crowd: 36,932)	Report
2.4 (16); 2.6 (30); 6.7 (43); 10.8 (68)	Q1; Q2; Q3; Final	3.3 (21); 9.8 (62); 12.17 (89); 15.21 (111)	Television broadcast: Seven Network
Milestone(s): Clint Bartram (50th AFL Game); Brownlow Votes: Paul Chapman (Geelong) 3 votes, Jimmy Bartel (Geelong) 2 votes, Steve Johnson (Geelong) 1 vote Record: 1 Win, 5 Losses, 0 Draws (68.3%); Ladder Position: 16th

==== Round 7 ====
Round 7
Sunday, 10 May (4:40 pm)	West Coast	def.	Melbourne	Subiaco Oval (crowd: 35,209)	Report
2.4 (16); 7.7 (49); 11.12 (78); 12.18 (90)	Q1; Q2; Q3; Final	1.1 (7); 7.3 (45); 10.3 (63); 13.4 (82)	Television broadcast: Foxtel
Milestone(s): Paul Johnson (50th AFL Game); Brownlow Votes: Mark LeCras (West Coast) 3 votes, Nathan Jones (Melbourne) 2 votes, Adam Selwood (West Coast) 1 vote Record: 1 Win, 6 Losses, 0 Draws(71.2%); Ladder Position: 16th

==== Round 8 ====
Round 8
Saturday, 16 May (2:10 pm)	Melbourne	def. by	Western Bulldogs	MCG (crowd: 28,279)	Report
5.2 (32); 10.3 (63); 11.4 (70); 15.7 (97)	Q1; Q2; Q3; Final	3.3 (21); 9.6 (60); 12.10 (82); 15.14 (104)	Television broadcast: Foxtel
Brownlow Votes: Matthew Boyd (Western Bulldogs) 3 votes, Paul Johnson (Melbourne) 2 votes, Jason Akermanis (Western Bulldogs) 1 vote Record: 1 Win, 7 Losses, 0 Draws (74.0%); Ladder Position: 16th

==== Round 9 ====
Round 9
Sunday, 24 May (4:40 pm)	Hawthorn	def.	Melbourne	MCG (crowd: 39,395)	Report
6.2 (38); 11.7 (73); 16.9 (105); 17.12 (114)	Q1; Q2; Q3; Final	2.5 (17); 4.6 (30); 8.10 (58); 13.14 (92)	Television broadcast: Foxtel
Milestone(s): Stefan Martin (1st AFL Goal); Brownlow Votes: Colin Sylvia (Melbourne) 3 votes, Jordan Lewis (Hawthorn) 2 votes, Brad Sewell (Hawthorn) 1 vote Record: 1 Win, 8 Losses, 0 Draws (74.9%); Ladder Position: 16th

==== Round 10 ====
Round 10
Saturday, 30 May (7:10 pm)	St Kilda	def.	Melbourne	Carrara Stadium (crowd: 9,112)	Report
5.3 (33); 7.8 (50); 10.11 (71); 11.17 (83)	Q1; Q2; Q3; Final	4.5 (29); 6.6 (42); 6.6 (42); 6.20 (46)	Television broadcast: Foxtel
Milestone(s): James Frawley (1st AFL Goal); Brownlow Votes: Lenny Hayes (St Kilda) 3 votes, Leigh Montagna (St Kilda) 2 votes, Nick Riewoldt (St Kilda) 1 vote Record: 1 Win, 9 Losses, 0 Draws (73.3%); Ladder Position: 16th

==== Round 11 ====
Round 11
Monday, 8 June (2:10 pm)	Melbourne	def. by	Collingwood	MCG (crowd: 61,287)	Report
0.4 (4); 5.6 (36); 6.9 (45); 8.12 (60)	Q1; Q2; Q3; Final	7.4 (46); 10.7 (67); 16.11 (107); 19.12 (126)	Television broadcast: Network Ten
Debut(s): Jack Watts; Brownlow Votes: Scott Pendlebury (Collingwood) 3 votes, Colin Sylvia (Melbourne) 2 votes, Brad Dick (Collingwood) 1 vote Record: 1 Win, 10 Losses, 0 Draws (70.4%); Ladder Position: 16th

==== Round 12 ====
Round 12
Friday, 19 June (7:40 pm)	Essendon	def.	Melbourne	Etihad Stadium (crowd: 42,087)	Report
6.3 (39); 10.7 (67); 17.13 (115); 19.17 (131)	Q1; Q2; Q3; Final	3.2 (20); 8.3 (51); 9.3 (57); 13.5 (83)	Television broadcast: Seven Network
Debut(s): Liam Jurrah; Brownlow Votes: Jobe Watson (Essendon) 3 votes, Scott Lucas (Essendon) 2 votes, Adam McPhee (Essendon) 1 vote Record:1 Win, 11 Losses, 0 Draws (69.7%); Ladder Position: 16th

==== Round 13 ====
Round 13
Saturday, 27 June (7:10 pm)	Brisbane Lions	def.	Melbourne	Gabba (crowd: 23,750)	Report
3.4 (22); 9.7 (61); 13.13 (91); 16.15 (111)	Q1; Q2; Q3; Final	2.0 (12); 2.2 (14); 2.5 (17); 8.8 (56)	Television broadcast: Foxtel
Brownlow Votes: Simon Black (Brisbane Lions) 3 votes, Jonathan Brown (Brisbane Lions) 2 votes, Luke Power (Brisbane Lions) 1 vote Record: 1 Win, 12 Losses, 0 Draws (68.1%); Ladder Position: 16th

==== Round 14 ====
Round 14
Saturday, 4 July (2:10 pm)	Melbourne	def.	West Coast	MCG (crowd: 23,149)	Report
6.1 (37); 11.2 (68); 16.6 (102); 17.10 (112)	Q1; Q2; Q3; Final	4.6 (30); 7.8 (50); 11.12 (78); 13.14 (92)	Television broadcast: Network Ten
Brownlow Votes: Jack Grimes (Melbourne) 3 votes, Brent Moloney (Melbourne) 2 votes, Nathan Jones (Melbourne) 1 vote Record: 2 Wins, 12 Losses, 0 Draws (71.5%); Ladder Position: 16th

==== Round 15 ====
Round 15
Sunday, 12 July (2:10 pm)	Melbourne	def.	Port Adelaide	MCG (crowd: 15,888)	Report
4.2 (26); 9.6 (60); 13.9 (87); 15.11 (101)	Q1; Q2; Q3; Final	3.3 (21); 7.6 (48); 10.8 (68); 13.12 (90)	Television broadcast: Seven Network
Brownlow Votes: Brent Moloney (Melbourne) 3 votes, Domenic Cassisi (Port Adelaide) 2 votes, Toby Thurstans (Port Adelaide) 1 vote Record: 3 Wins, 12 Losses, 0 Draws (73.8%); Ladder Position: 15th

==== Round 16 ====
Round 16
Saturday, 18 July (2:10 pm)	Geelong	def.	Melbourne	Skilled Stadium (crowd: 21,160)	Report
7.4 (46); 9.9 (63); 14.13 (97); 17.15 (117)	Q1; Q2; Q3; Final	0.2 (2); 3.2 (20); 7.3 (45); 11.5 (71)	Television broadcast: Network Ten
Brownlow Votes: Matthew Scarlett (Geelong) 3 votes, Paul Chapman (Geelong) 2 votes, Gary Ablett (Geelong) 1 vote Record: 3 Wins, 13 Losses, 0 Draws (72.9%); Ladder Position: 15th

==== Round 17 ====
Round 17
Sunday, 26 July (2:10 pm)	Melbourne	def. by	Sydney	Manuka Oval (crowd: 7,311)	Report
1.2 (8); 2.6 (18); 4.11 (35); 6.14 (50)	Q1; Q2; Q3; Final	3.4 (22); 6.6 (42); 7.6 (48); 10.8 (68)	Television broadcast: Foxtel
Debut(s): Jordie McKenzie; Brownlow Votes: Ryan O'Keefe (Sydney) 3 votes, Rhyce Shaw (Sydney) 2 votes, Darren Jolly (Sydney) 1 vote Record: 3 Wins, 14 Losses, 0 Draws (73.0%); Ladder Position: 16th

==== Round 18 ====
Round 18
Sunday, 2 August (1:10 pm)	Melbourne	def. by	Richmond	MCG (crowd: 37,438)	Report
2.0 (12); 4.3 (27); 8.7 (55); 12.10 (82)	Q1; Q2; Q3; Final	1.5 (11); 4.8 (32); 7.10 (52); 12.14 (86)	Television broadcast: Foxtel
Brownlow Votes: Ben Cousins (Richmond) 3 votes, James McDonald (Melbourne) 2 votes, Brett Deledio (Richmond) 1 vote Record: 3 Wins, 15 Losses, 0 Draws (74.0%); Ladder Position: 16th

==== Round 19 ====
Round 19
Sunday, 9 August (1:10 pm)	North Melbourne	def.	Melbourne	Etihad Stadium (crowd: 16,594)	Report
4.1 (25); 7.5 (47); 14.8 (92); 19.9 (123)	Q1; Q2; Q3; Final	3.3 (21); 3.7 (25); 7.10 (52); 8.13 (61)	Television broadcast: Foxtel
Debut(s): Rohan Bail, Tom McNamara; Milestone(s): Lynden Dunn (50th AFL Game); Brownlow Votes: Brent Harvey (North Melbourne) 3 votes, Todd Goldstein (North Melbourne) 2 votes, Drew Petrie (North Melbourne) 1 vote Record: 3 Wins, 16 Losses, 0 Draws (72.5%); Ladder Position: 16th

==== Round 20 ====
Round 20
Sunday, 16 August (1:10 pm)	Melbourne	def.	Fremantle	MCG (crowd: 13,004)	Report
4.0 (24); 9.4 (58); 13.5 (83); 20.7 (127)	Q1; Q2; Q3; Final	3.4 (22); 4.7 (31); 6.9 (45); 9.10 (64)	Television broadcast: Foxtel
Milestone(s): Tom McNamara(1st AFL Goal); Brownlow Votes: Aaron Davey (Melbourne) 3 votes, Matthew Bate (Melbourne) 2 votes, Shane Valenti (Melbourne) 1 vote Record: 4 Wins, 16 Losses, 0 Draws (76.5%); Ladder Position: 16th

==== Round 21 ====
Round 21
Saturday, 22 August (2:10 pm)	Carlton	def.	Melbourne	Etihad Stadium (crowd: 37,433)	Report
6.3 (39); 12.5 (77); 18.9 (117); 24.9 (153)	Q1; Q2; Q3; Final	4.2 (26); 8.3 (51); 12.4 (76); 15.6 (96)	Television broadcast: Network Ten
Brownlow Votes: Chris Judd (Carlton) 3 votes, Brendan Fevola (Carlton) 2 votes, Marc Murphy (Carlton) 1 vote Record: 4 Wins, 17 Losses, 0 Draws (75.5%); Ladder Position: 16th

==== Round 22 ====
Round 22
Sunday, 30 August (2:10 pm)	Melbourne	def. by	St Kilda	MCG (crowd: 36,748)	Report
4.2 (26); 6.5 941); 8.6 (54); 10.7 (67)	Q1; Q2; Q3; Final	2.2 (14); 7.5 (47); 10.10 (70); 19.12 (114)	Television broadcast: Seven Network
Brownlow Votes: Nick Dal Santo (St Kilda) 3 votes, Nick Riewoldt (St Kilda) 2 votes, Lenny Hayes (St Kilda) 1 vote Record: 4 Wins, 18 Losses, 0 Draws (74.7%); Ladder Position: 16th

== Notable matches ==
=== NAB Cup and NAB Challenge ===
Week 1: Melbourne looked to be on the verge of causing an upset over the 2008 Premiers, Hawthorn, leading 1.8.8 (65) to 0.5.2 (32) at three-quarter time. However, the Hawks made a successful comeback, keeping the 2008 wooden spooners goal-less in the final quarter as Jarryd Roughead snatched the lead back for Hawthorn with a mark and a goal 30 seconds from full-time.

=== Home and away season ===
Round 4: Melbourne registered their first win of the season defeating a winless Richmond by 8 points. Despite holding a 31-point lead at half time, the Demons held off a fast finishing Tigers outfit in the final quarter to secure their first win against a Victorian team since round 22, 2007. It was also Melbourne's first win as the "away" side since round 14, 2007.

Round 10: Melbourne put up a brave first half effort against an undefeated St Kilda, trailing by only 8 points at the main break. However, the Saints kept Melbourne goalless in the second half to finish out comfortable winners by 27 points.

Round 11: In the Queen's Birthday clash, the 2008 number 1 draft pick Jack Watts made his debut against Collingwood. He received a harsh welcoming to the AFL when he came off from the interchange bench for the first time in the game: Watts was immediately crunched by the larger bodies of three Collingwood players while the ball came his direction, as Melbourne suffered its biggest loss for the season (66 points).

Round 12: Liam Jurrah (the first AFL player from a remote tribal community) made his AFL debut, against Essendon. He kicked his first goal with a marking attempt that turned into a falling crumb in the goal-square. This goal was nominated for Goal of the Year. Melbourne were out-classed by the Bombers, losing easily by 48 points.

Round 14: On 2 July, in an emotional press conference, Melbourne president Jim Stynes announced that he was diagnosed with cancer and had to step down as president for the rest of the season. Melbourne played its most emotional game of the year against West Coast and recorded its highest first quarter score of the season. Despite a late charge by the Eagles in the final quarter, Melbourne resisted the attack and won the game by 20 points. After the match, the players headed into the dressing rooms holding up Stynes' infamous number 37 guernsey, which he wore during the 1987 Preliminary Final against Hawthorn. Jack Grimes received the NAB Rising Star nomination for round 14.

Round 15: Melbourne won consecutive games for the first time since round 11, 2007 when it downed Port Adelaide by 11 points, after holding a 30-point lead midway through the third quarter. Liam Jurrah received the NAB Rising Star nomination for Round 15.

Round 18: In a match that was criticised for tanking strategies, Jordan McMahon took a mark in Richmond's forward 50 and goaled after the final siren to give the Tigers a 4-point win. During the game Melbourne coach Dean Bailey placed several players in unusual positions. These included placing ruckman Paul Johnson and midfielder James McDonald in the backline; playing forward Brad Miller in the ruck; placing defenders James Frawley and Matthew Warnock in the forward line, as well as leaving Russell Robertson and Colin Sylvia out of the game for Michael Newton and rookie Jake Spencer.

Round 20: In front of a crowd of only 13,004, Melbourne inflicted its only thrashing of the season against fellow cellar dwellers Fremantle after a blowout in the second quarter to win by 63 points. They would record its first 60-point victory since round 8, 2006 as well as the first time they scored 20 or more goals in a game since round 22, 2007.

Round 22: Veterans Russell Robertson, Paul Wheatley and Matthew Whelan played their last ever AFL match, against ladder leaders St Kilda. Melbourne put on another strong first half performance, trailing by only a goal at half time, which included a backwards goal from Liam Jurrah at the start of the quarter. However, St Kilda ran over the top of Melbourne in the second half, winning comfortably by 47 points to secure the minor premiership. Melbourne, on the other hand, received the wooden spoon and ensured that their priority pick would be safe. They had the first and second picks in the 2009 AFL draft.

== Ladder ==
2009 AFL ladder
Pos	Team	Pld	W	L	D	PF	PA	PP	Pts	
1	St Kilda	22	20	2	0	2197	1411	155.7	80	Finals series
2	Geelong (P)	22	18	4	0	2312	1815	127.4	72	Finals series
3	Western Bulldogs	22	15	7	0	2378	1940	122.6	60	Finals series
4	Collingwood	22	15	7	0	2174	1778	122.3	60	Finals series
5	Adelaide	22	14	8	0	2104	1789	117.6	56	Finals series
6	Brisbane Lions	22	13	8	1	2017	1890	106.7	54	Finals series
7	Carlton	22	13	9	0	2270	2055	110.5	52	Finals series
8	Essendon	22	10	11	1	2080	2127	97.8	42	Finals series
9	Hawthorn	22	9	13	0	1962	2120	92.5	36	
10	Port Adelaide	22	9	13	0	1990	2244	88.7	36	
11	West Coast	22	8	14	0	1893	2029	93.3	32	
12	Sydney	22	8	14	0	1888	2027	93.1	32	
13	North Melbourne	22	7	14	1	1680	2015	83.4	30	
14	Fremantle	22	6	16	0	1747	2259	77.3	24	
15	Richmond	22	5	16	1	1774	2388	74.3	22	
16	Melbourne	22	4	18	0	1706	2285	74.7	16	

Source: AFL ladder
Rules for classification: 1) points; 2) percentage; 3) number of points for.
(P) Premiers

=== Ladder breakdown by opposition ===
Opponent	Played	Won	Lost	Drew	Premiership points	Points for	Points against	Percentage (%)
Fremantle	1	1	0	0	4	127	64	198.44
West Coast	2	1	1	0	4	194	182	106.59
Richmond	2	1	1	0	4	182	178	102.25
Western Bulldogs	1	0	1	0	0	97	104	93.27
Hawthorn	1	0	1	0	0	92	114	80.70
Port Adelaide	2	1	1	0	4	191	237	80.59
Sydney	1	0	1	0	0	50	68	73.53
Adelaide	1	0	1	0	0	34	51	66.67
Essendon	1	0	1	0	0	83	131	63.36
Carlton	1	0	1	0	0	96	153	62.75
Geelong	2	0	2	0	0	139	228	60.96
St Kilda	2	0	2	0	0	113	197	57.36
North Melbourne	2	0	2	0	0	128	224	57.14
Collingwood	2	0	2	0	0	124	243	51.03
Brisbane Lions	1	0	1	0	0	56	111	50.45
Total	22	4	18	0	16	1706	2285	74.66

== Brownlow Medal ==
=== Brownlow Medal tally ===
Player	1 vote games	2 vote games	3 vote games	Total votes
Aaron Davey	1	1	1	(6)
Colin Sylvia	0	1	1	(5)
Brent Moloney	0	1	1	(5)
Nathan Jones	2	1	0	(4)
Jack Grimes	0	0	1	(3)
James McDonald	0	1	0	(2)
Paul Johnson	0	1	0	(2)
Matthew Bate	0	1	0	(2)
Brock McLean	1	0	0	(1)
Shane Valenti	1	0	0	(1)
Total	5	7	4	(31)

== Awards ==
=== Keith 'Bluey' Truscott Medal tally (top 10) ===
Position	Player	Votes
1st	Aaron Davey	(82)
2nd	Brent Moloney	(69)
3rd	Cameron Bruce	(56)
4th	Matthew Bate	(47)
5th	Nathan Jones	(44)
5th	Colin Sylvia	(44)
5th	Matthew Warnock	(44)
8th	James Frawley	(43)
10th	James McDonald	(42)
10th	Cale Morton	(42)

Keith 'Bluey' Truscott Trophy – Aaron Davey

Sid Anderson Memorial Trophy (Second in the Best and Fairest) – Brent Moloney

Ron Barassi Snr Memorial Trophy (Third in the Best and Fairest) – Cameron Bruce

Ivor Warne-Smith Memorial Trophy (Fourth in the Best and Fairest) – Matthew Bate

Dick Taylor Memorial Trophy (Fifth in the Best and Fairest) – Nathan Jones, Colin Sylvia, Matthew Warnock

Harold Ball Memorial Trophy (Best First Year Player) – Liam Jurrah

Troy Broadbridge Trophy (highest polling MFC player in the Casey Best and Fairest) – Shane Valenti

Ron Barassi Leadership Award – Brent Moloney

Ian Ridley Club Ambassador Award – Shane Valenti

Norm Smith Memorial Trophy (Coach's Award) – James Frawley

Leading Goalkicker Award – Russell Robertson (29)
