= Melbourne Football Club tanking scandal =

2009 Australian rules football scandal

The Melbourne Football Club tanking scandal refers to issues involving the Melbourne Football Club and allegations that it had tanked towards the latter part of the 2009 season – that is, that it had intentionally lost matches near the end of the season so that it would receive a priority draft pick in the upcoming draft. The club was found not guilty of charges related to tanking, but senior coach Dean Bailey and general manager of football operations Chris Connolly were both found guilty of related charges.

== Background ==
In August 2012, AFL Integrity Officer Brett Clothier announced a full investigation into Melbourne's 2009 season, regarding allegations that the Demons had tanked games during the season in order to secure a priority draft pick that year, available to clubs winning fewer than five games. The press had published such allegations previously, but the investigation was prompted most specifically by statements from former Melbourne player Brock McLean during a television interview in July 2012, when he revealed that he requested to be traded from the club at the end of 2009 because he was dissatisfied with its match strategies during that time. Melbourne club officials, led by board chairman Don McLardy, denied the tanking allegations.

Then-senior coach Dean Bailey had previously made statements, interpreted by some as an admission of tanking, at the press conference which followed his sacking as senior coach in August 2011. Bailey was quoted as saying:

I had no hesitation at all in the first two years of ensuring this club was well placed for draft picks. I think what we've done is the right thing by the club, and if it cost me my job, so be it. But the club is always bigger than the individual. I was asked to do the best thing by the Melbourne Football Club and I did it. I did the right thing by the Melbourne Football Club. I put players in different positions to enable them [to develop] … I think the whole football club agreed we wanted to develop our players so we did.

== Notable matches in question ==
Three matches were investigated in particular.

=== Round 17, 2009 vs Sydney Swans ===
Senior Coach Dean Bailey made seven changes to the team that was defeated by Geelong by 46 points the previous week. In the match, Melbourne made 67 interchange rotations, down from its season average of 85.

=== Round 18, 2009 vs Richmond ===
The match against Richmond drew the most attention. Richmond, which ultimately finished second-last and was playing under an interim coach following Terry Wallace's midseason sacking, was Melbourne's most likely opportunity to win a game at the end of the year. With less than two minutes remaining in the match, Melbourne's Ricky Petterd kicked a goal on the run to give Melbourne the lead by two points; from the following centre bounce, Ben Cousins drove the Tigers forward before the Demons managed to clear, but with forty seconds remaining the Tigers forced the ball forward, and after a scramble in the final seconds, Jordan McMahon took a mark right on the final siren. McMahon converted to give Richmond a four-point win.

During the match, coach Dean Bailey placed several players in unusual positions. These included placing ruckman Paul Johnson and midfielder James McDonald in the backline; playing forward Brad Miller in the ruck; placing defenders James Frawley and Matthew Warnock in the forward line, as well as leaving Russell Robertson and Colin Sylvia out of the game for Michael Newton and rookie Jake Spencer. The Herald Sun later accused Bailey of making these changes during the match in an attempt to throw the match.

=== Round 22, 2009 vs St Kilda ===
Against minor premiers St Kilda, Dean Bailey moved James Frawley off forward Nick Riewoldt, despite Frawley having limited Riewoldt's effect on the game; he shifted Lynden Dunn onto Riewoldt, and Riewoldt kicked three goals before Frawley was reassigned to him; by that time, Melbourne was in a position where it was unable to win the match. Additionally, Liam Jurrah was benched in the third quarter despite kicking two goals; he did not return to the field until late in the final quarter. Melbourne lost the match by 47 points.

== Outcome ==
The investigation lasted 203 days and Clothier interviewed over 50 people associated with the club. The league released its findings in February 2013, and found the club not guilty of tanking.

However, it did find Dean Bailey and then-general manager of football operations Chris Connolly guilty of acting in a manner prejudicial to the interests of the competition. This related most specifically to a meeting in July 2009, which became known colloquially as "the vault", in which Connolly allegedly openly discussed the potential benefits to the club of tanking.

The guilty parties received the following penalties:

- Connolly, who was still at the club in 2013 but serving in a role outside the football department, was suspended from serving in any position at any club for 12 months (until 1 February 2014, or 22 matches); while he was subsequently sacked by the club in October 2013, this was not directly linked to the tanking scandal.
- Bailey, who had been fired as Melbourne coach in 2011 and was serving as an assistant coach at the Adelaide Crows, was suspended from his position for the first sixteen matches of the 2013 season and barred from having any contact with the Crows' playing group during that time.
- The Melbourne Football Club, which was complicit to the offending in its capacity as Connolly's and Bailey's employer, was fined $500,000.

None of Melbourne, Connolly or Bailey contested these penalties.

== See also ==
- List of Australian sports controversies
