= Jack Watts (footballer) =

Australian rules footballer, born 1991

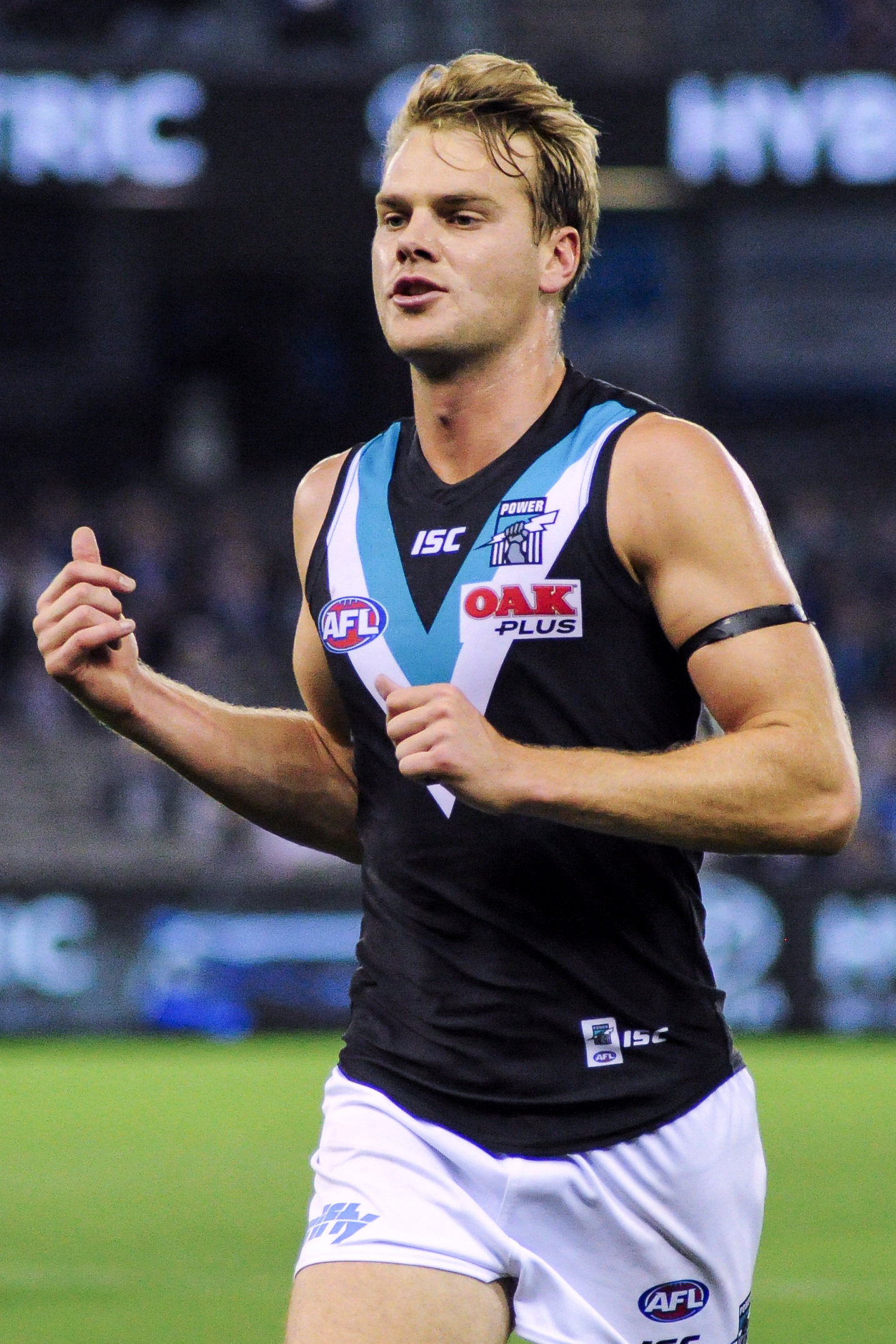
- Watts playing for Port Adelaide in June 2018

Personal information
- Born: 26 March 1991 (age 35)
- Original team: Sandringham Dragons (TAC Cup)
- Draft: No. 1, 2008 national draft
- Debut: Round 11, 2009, Melbourne vs. Collingwood, at MCG
- Height: 196 cm (6 ft 5 in)
- Weight: 88 kg (194 lb)
- Position: Utility

Playing career^{1}
Years	Club	Games (Goals)
2009–2017	Melbourne	152 (143)
2018–2019	Port Adelaide	21 (18)
Total		174 (161)

Representative team honours
Years	Team	Games (Goals)
2019	South Australia	2 (5)
- ^{1} Playing statistics correct to the end of 2019.

Career highlights
- Larke Medal: 2008

Jack Watts (born 26 March 1991) is a former Australian rules footballer in the Australian Football League (AFL). A utility, 1.96 metres (6 ft 5 in) tall and weighing 93 kilograms (205 lb), Watts played in any position on the ground and has played for extended periods of time as a forward, defender, wingman, and back-up ruckman. He was a talented sportsman at a young age, playing both basketball and Australian rules football. In basketball, he represented Victoria and Australia, before giving up the sport to focus on football. He was recognised as a gifted footballer at a young age when he represented Victoria at the under-12 level. He went on to represent the state in the 2008 AFL Under 18 Championships as a bottom-aged player, where he won the Larke Medal as the best player in the championships and was named as the full-forward in the All-Australian team.

Watts' performances in the championships saw him recruited by the Melbourne Football Club with the first overall selection in the 2008 AFL draft at seventeen years of age, a year younger than most of his fellow draftees. The hype surrounding Watts in his first season was profound until he made his debut in the Queen's Birthday clash against Collingwood in the 2009 season. The management of his debut has led to long-term criticism of the club because he was played despite being unready for senior football. Instead, Watts was used as a promotional tool to create a sense of hope for long-suffering fans. Criticism has followed Watts closely throughout his career due to the expectations that were placed on him being the number one draft pick and many believing he was not living up to his potential.

Despite the criticism that has followed Watts, he has maintained a spot in the senior side throughout his career and has played over 170 matches. Furthermore, he has featured in the top ten of Melbourne's best and fairest count three times, including finishing fifth in the 2016 count. Drafted as a forward and playing the majority of his career in the forward line, he has kicked over 160 goals, including a career-high season in 2016, in which he kicked thirty-eight goals. Although he has played a majority of his career in the forward line, he has been praised for his versatility, which allows him to play in multiple positions on the ground.

== Early life ==
Watts was born to Janine and Andrew Watts on 26 March 1991 in Victoria, Australia. He proved himself as an adept Australian rules footballer at a young age when he represented Victoria at the under-12 AFL carnival. An equally talented basketball player, he represented both Victoria and Australia as a junior, earning a scholarship with the Australian Institute of Sport (AIS). In 2007, he was rewarded with a second scholarship with the AIS, this time for football, as part of the eleventh intake of the AIS-AFL Academy. He missed playing in the 2007 AFL under-16 championships for Victoria Metro and most of the basketball season after he broke his collarbone twice. Despite attempting to play both basketball and football at an elite level, he ultimately gave up his basketball scholarship with the AIS in mid-2008 to focus on a football career; at the time, he was considered the best point guard for his age in Victoria and potentially the best in the country.

At seventeen years of age, Watts entered the 2008 season primarily playing school football with Brighton Grammar in the Associated Public Schools of Victoria (APS) competition, instead of under-18 level in the TAC Cup with the Sandringham Dragons. He was completing year eleven and could choose to nominate for the AFL draft in either 2008 or 2009; touted as a likely early draft pick despite being a year younger than most of his fellow draft prospects, he spent the majority of the season undecided on whether he would nominate for the 2008 draft. He did, however, state that he would remain in Victoria in 2009 to complete year twelve at Brighton Grammar even if he was recruited by an interstate team.

For the first half of the season, Western Australian, Nic Naitanui was considered the likely number-one draft pick; however, after Watts received mid-year state honours representing Victoria Metro at the 2008 AFL Under 18 Championships, he established himself during the championships as one of the "best young talents in the country". The first round match of the championships against Victoria Country saw him take a pack mark with seconds left in the game and kick the winning goal, his fourth of the match; his resolve led to one recruiter stating "If the draft was on tomorrow and I had the first pick, I'd be choosing him ... without hesitation. He's just a natural player, he's an athlete and he's a very strong competitor." He was rewarded with the Larke Medal as the best player in division one of the championships and was named the full-forward in the All-Australian team after he kicked fifteen goals during the championships.

Watts announced in October that he would nominate for the 2008 draft, with he, Naitanui and another West Australian, Daniel Rich, touted as the most likely players to be recruited with the first selection in the 2008 AFL draft. He furthered his claim as the potential number one pick when he recorded the second fastest time by a non-Indigenous player in the twenty metre sprint with 2.82 seconds at the AFL draft camp, in addition to placing second in the agility test, fifth in the standing vertical jump and seventh in the repeated sprints. His rise during the year saw The Age journalist, Emma Quayle, describe him as the "most complete prospect in [the] draft, he has all the athletic qualities you could want in a key forward—he's quick, agile, he's a good kick and he can mark". In the weeks leading up to the draft, it was widely accepted by the media that he would be the first pick in the draft.

== AFL career ==
=== 2009–2011: Early career ===
Watts was recruited by the Melbourne Football Club with the first overall selection in the 2008 national draft. Drafted at seventeen years of age, he was in the last draft where a player could be recruited at seventeen, with the AFL requiring that, effective from the 2009 AFL draft, a player must turn at least eighteen years of age in the year they are drafted. The hype placed on him by the club was high when he was presented with the number four guernsey by six-time Melbourne premiership player, Ron Barassi—a guernsey number previously worn by club legend and the winner of ten premierships with the club as a player and coach, Norm Smith—in a ceremony at the Melbourne Cricket Ground (MCG) two days after being drafted. Completing year twelve in 2009, the need to manage school with football saw the club electing to not play him in pre-season matches during the NAB Cup.

Watts played his first match for the year in the Victorian Football League (VFL) reserves for Melbourne's affiliate team, the Casey Scorpions, in the middle of April; against Port Melbourne, he recorded twenty disposals and a goal. Spending two weeks in the VFL reserves, he was promoted to the VFL seniors for the forty-two point win against Coburg where he recorded sixteen disposals and three goals. A bye in the VFL a week later allowed him to return to APS football, playing for Brighton Grammar; a rare occurrence of an AFL-listed player playing school football, he kicked three goals in a draw against Melbourne Grammar. He spent the next three weeks in the VFL, where he recorded twenty-two and twenty-three disposals in the second and third week respectively, which saw him earn a spot in the AFL side for the annual Queen's Birthday clash against Collingwood at the MCG in round eleven.

With the Queen's Birthday match marketed as the club's biggest match during the year, then-senior coach, Dean Bailey, promoted the debut of Watts by imploring fans to come along so they "will look back at this time in three, four or five years to see where it all began and to be able to say I was there the day Jack Watts made his debut". His first touch saw him gang tackled by three Collingwood players, another contest saw him beaten by Martin Clarke, which led to a Collingwood goal; Collingwood captain, Nick Maxwell, gestured to Watts "that's your goal, mate! Welcome to real footy". The team ultimately lost by sixty-six points with Watts recording just eight disposals, a mark and a behind, playing on the half-forward line. He retained his spot the next week for a forty-eight point loss against Essendon at Etihad Stadium in which he kicked his first AFL goal. Recording nine disposals in his second match, the excitement surrounding Watts quickly turned to criticism with his school football coach and former AFL footballer, Robert Shaw, stating that he was not ready for AFL football. Premiership player and coach, Leigh Matthews, said he had not seen anything in Watts' first two matches to warrant him being the number one draft pick. He played his third and final AFL match of the year the next week in the fifty-five point loss against Brisbane at the Gabba, where The Age journalist, Andrew Stafford, noted his confidence looked low. He spent the remainder of the year playing in the VFL.

A quad strain in February 2010 curtailed Watts' pre-season, and a subsequent back injury further slowed down his preparation for the season. He was placed on a modified program, which meant he was unlikely to play in the AFL early in the season, instead easing him into VFL matches. He played his first match for the year in a VFL practice match against the Northern Bullants; he gathered nine disposals, playing in just the first half of the match. Round five in the VFL saw him kick four goals and he was named in the best players in the seventy-five point win against Coburg. His performance in the match saw him called up to the AFL side the next week for the round eight match against West Coast at the MCG. The match drew attention as it was the first time he would play an AFL match against Nic Naitanui, who was drafted with the pick directly after him in the 2008 draft. In the twenty-nine point loss, he recorded fifteen disposals and five marks.

Watts retained his spot the next week for the round nine match against Port Adelaide at TIO Stadium in Darwin, and kicked two early goals to help the club win by one point. He maintained his spot in the side for the remainder of the year, even after recording just three disposals against Carlton in round eleven, with the club opting to give him game time and reiterate he was a long-term prospect who would get better with time. He played fifteen games in his second season, kicking ten goals, with former Essendon forward and three-time Coleman Medallist, Matthew Lloyd, stating Watts would be "ecstatic" with his season and he "presented across half-forward so well and is building his body and engine to hold down that position for a sustained period for Melbourne". Shane Crawford, the 1999 Brownlow Medallist, noted he had improved that year and showed enough glimpses to predict he would be a top ten player in the competition in the next few years. A club post-season trip to China saw Watts play in an exhibition match against Brisbane known as the Shanghai Showdown; played at Jiangwan Stadium, Melbourne won the match by five points.

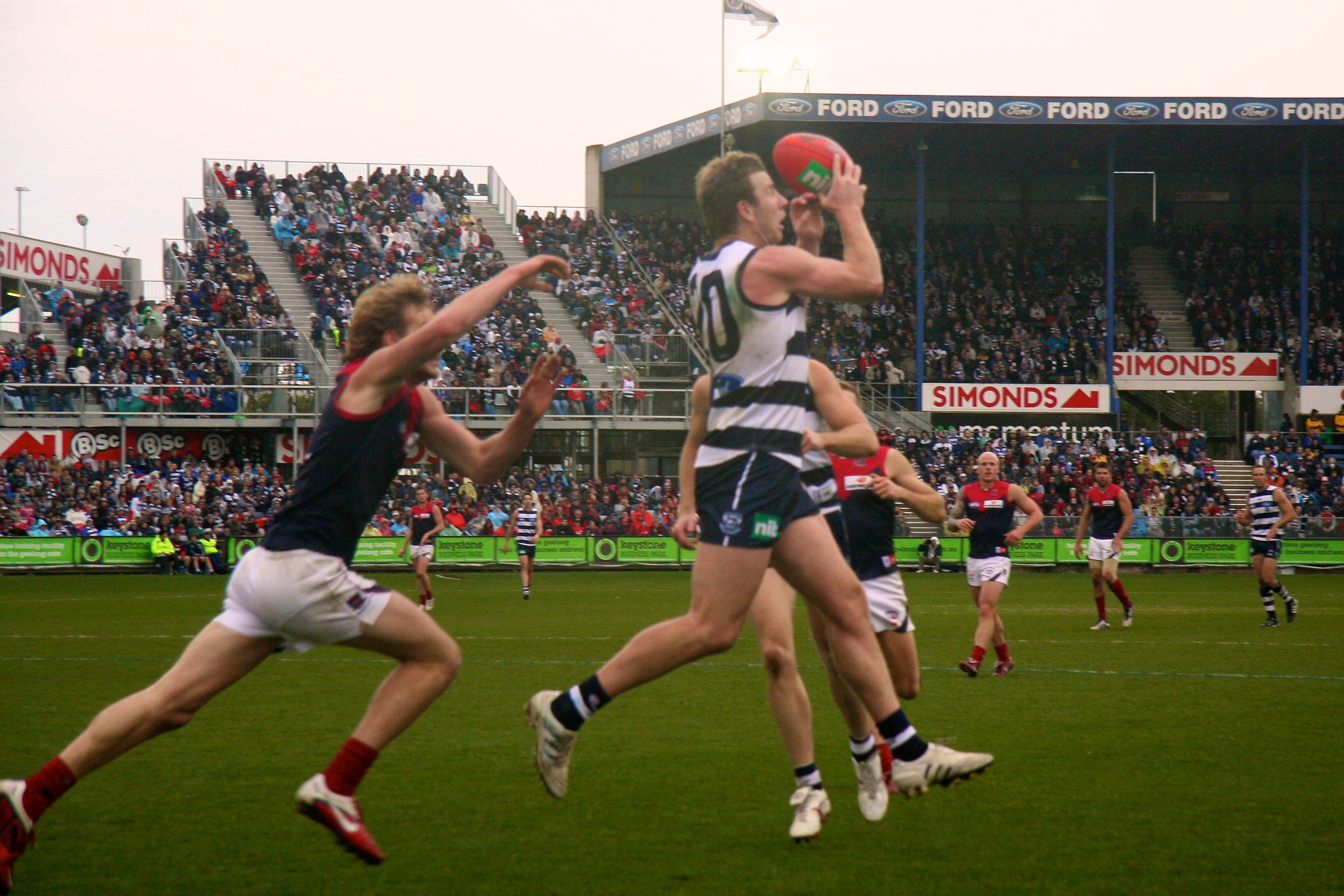
Watts (left) playing in defence on Geelong's Steve Johnson in round 19, 2011.

Entering the 2011 season, Watts added significant muscle weight during the off-season, which saw him play with greater impact in the forward line, as evidenced in strong performances during pre-season matches and the NAB Cup. Forming a forward partnership with Liam Jurrah, pressure was expected to ease off of Watts who was still seen as a developing player. He started the home and away season slowly, struggling to make an impact during matches, and during the round three and four wins against Brisbane and Gold Coast respectively, he was the substitute in both matches—substituted off in round three and starting substitute in round four—to finish with six disposals in each of the matches. Head of football writer at the Herald Sun, Mark Robinson described him as an "almost player" who "almost took the mark, almost won the ball, [and] almost changed the game"; in addition, 1987 premiership coach, Robert Walls, noted he was "floundering".

With the club having their first bye of the season the next week, Watts returned from the break with a turnaround in form; named in Melbourne's best players in the fifty-four point loss to West Coast at Patersons Stadium in round six, he was praised for his decision making and was one of teams' positive sparks according to The Age reporter, Simon White. He continued his good form and during the round ten loss against Carlton, he was entrusted with a new role in defence as the loose man; his new role was partly to help him gain confidence by having more disposals and to help with his forward development. After a few weeks of playing in both the forward line and off of half-back, he played as a forward for the entire round thirteen match against Fremantle in the eighty-nine point win at the MCG; he recorded twenty-four disposals and a then-career high three goals. He backed this up the next week by kicking three goals and finished with nineteen disposals—eleven of which were contested—four marks and four tackles in the twenty-seven point win against Richmond at the MCG; he earned his first Brownlow Medal votes in his career, receiving one vote, meaning he was the third best player on the ground as adjudged by the field umpires. Dean Bailey acknowledged after the match that Watts had had a consistent season to that point and then-teammate, Colin Sylvia, said his consistency was imperative for his development and he had established himself as an AFL footballer.

A drop in Melbourne's performances saw Watts return to playing parts of games in the back line; the week after the club suffered a 186-point loss to Geelong at Skilled Stadium in round nineteen—the second heaviest defeat in VFL/AFL history which ultimately cost Dean Bailey his job—caretaker coach, Todd Viney, praised Watts for his performance in defence, stating he "really stood up" and "his work-rate was excellent" in the seventy-six point loss to Carlton. Playing every match for the year, his season was noted for his continual improvement, which was evident in his ninth-place finish in the club best and fairest count.

=== 2012–2013: Playing as a defender and inconsistencies ===
With the off-season acquisition of Mitch Clark in the 2011 trade period, who was projected to be the number one forward in the team, the forward load was expected to be relieved off of Watts, who new coach, Mark Neeld, stated would play primarily as a forward alongside Clark, rather than as both a forward and back as was the case the previous season. He struggled for form during the 2012 NAB Cup where he had just three combined possessions in the first two matches against Brisbane and Gold Coast, before he was substituted out of the match against Collingwood the next week where he managed just seven disposals, which drew the ire of former Collingwood coach, Mick Malthouse, who said he lacked ambition when playing. He was subsequently omitted for the final pre-season match against Port Adelaide.

After having an "impressive performance" playing for the Casey Scorpions in the VFL the week before the first round of the AFL season, Watts was named in the round one team for the match against Brisbane at the MCG. Struggling in the forward-line during pre-season matches, he instead started the match playing on the wing and finished with seventeen disposals. Playing the first five matches for the season, he struggled for consistency and was subsequently dropped for the round six match against Geelong at Simonds Stadium. With Neeld claiming Watts "had a few things [he needed] to work on", he played on the wing in the VFL where he kicked four goals and recorded twenty disposals and nine marks in the forty-six point win against Geelong in round seven. He stayed in the reserves the next week for the fifty-two point win against the Box Hill and collected twenty-five disposals. His performances in the VFL saw him recalled to the senior side for the 101-point loss against Sydney at the Sydney Cricket Ground in round eight; he played the match as the loose man in defence and recorded a career-high thirty-four disposals, in addition to eleven marks, eight rebound-50s and fourteen intercept possessions, the second most by any player that season to that point.

Watts maintained a spot in defence and was praised for his efforts there by the media; in the three-week period following his return to the AFL side, he ranked first in the league for intercept marks and intercept possessions, and second in rebound-50s. He played particularly well in the six point win against the second-placed team, Essendon, in round ten where he recorded twenty-four disposals, seven marks, seven rebound-50s and four tackles to earn three Brownlow votes, thereby being adjudged the best player on the ground by the field umpires. Three weeks later, he played his fiftieth AFL match in the seventy-eight point win against Greater Western Sydney at the MCG in round thirteen. After playing every match from rounds eight to fifteen, he was forced to miss five weeks of football due to an ankle injury; he returned for the twenty-five point win against Greater Western Sydney at Manuka Oval in round twenty-one, to play the remainder of the season and finish with fifteen games in total.

The recruitment of Chris Dawes during the 2012 trade period meant Watts would remain playing in defence for the 2013 season according to Mark Neeld; former Melbourne player, David Schwarz, said prior to the commencement of the season that Watts would flourish in defence and that he would ultimately become a consistent player. The opening round loss to Port Adelaide by seventy-nine points at the MCG where he managed just seven disposals saw the players booed by Melbourne fans as they left the field; things did not become easier the next week when the club lost to Essendon by 148-points at the MCG, a game in which he was substituted out and was jeered by the crowd when this was announced. His poor to start to the season led to him being dropped for the round three match against West Coast at the MCG; instead of playing for Casey in the VFL, he did not play any football for the weekend. Despite not playing and football for the week, he was recalled to the senior side for the forty-one point win against Greater Western Sydney at the MCG in round four.

Watts returned to the forward line the next week in the twenty-eight point loss to Brisbane at the Gabba in round five where he kicked two goals and was named in Melbourne's best players. This was his last match before straining his hamstring and subsequently missing three weeks of football; he returned for the ninety point loss against Fremantle at Patersons Stadium in round nine. In the lead up to the match, reports emerged that he was unhappy at Melbourne due to the club's misfortunes and that he would seek a trade away from the club with Fremantle being a possible destination. After the sacking of Mark Neeld in mid-June, Watts stated he wanted to remain at the club, however, he put contract negotiations on hold at the end of July and stated he would not decide on whether he would re-sign with the club until a new senior coach was appointed.

Interim coach, Neil Craig, opted to use Watts in a forward role and in Craig's second match in charge, he kicked a career-high four goals in the three point win over the Western Bulldogs at the MCG in round fourteen. In addition, he took a match-saving mark in defence and was awarded three Brownlow votes by the field umpires. His form improved under Craig, and Watts admitted he was not a fan of Neeld's hard-line coaching style, which was one of the reasons behind his poor form during Neeld's tenure. In the final round match against the Western Bulldogs at Etihad Stadium, he kicked an equal career-high four goals and in the eleven matches Neil Craig coached, Watts kicked eighteen goals. The end of season appointment of Paul Roos as senior coach resulted in Watts re-signing with the club on a three-year contract.

=== 2014–2017: Return to forward line and fulfilling potential ===
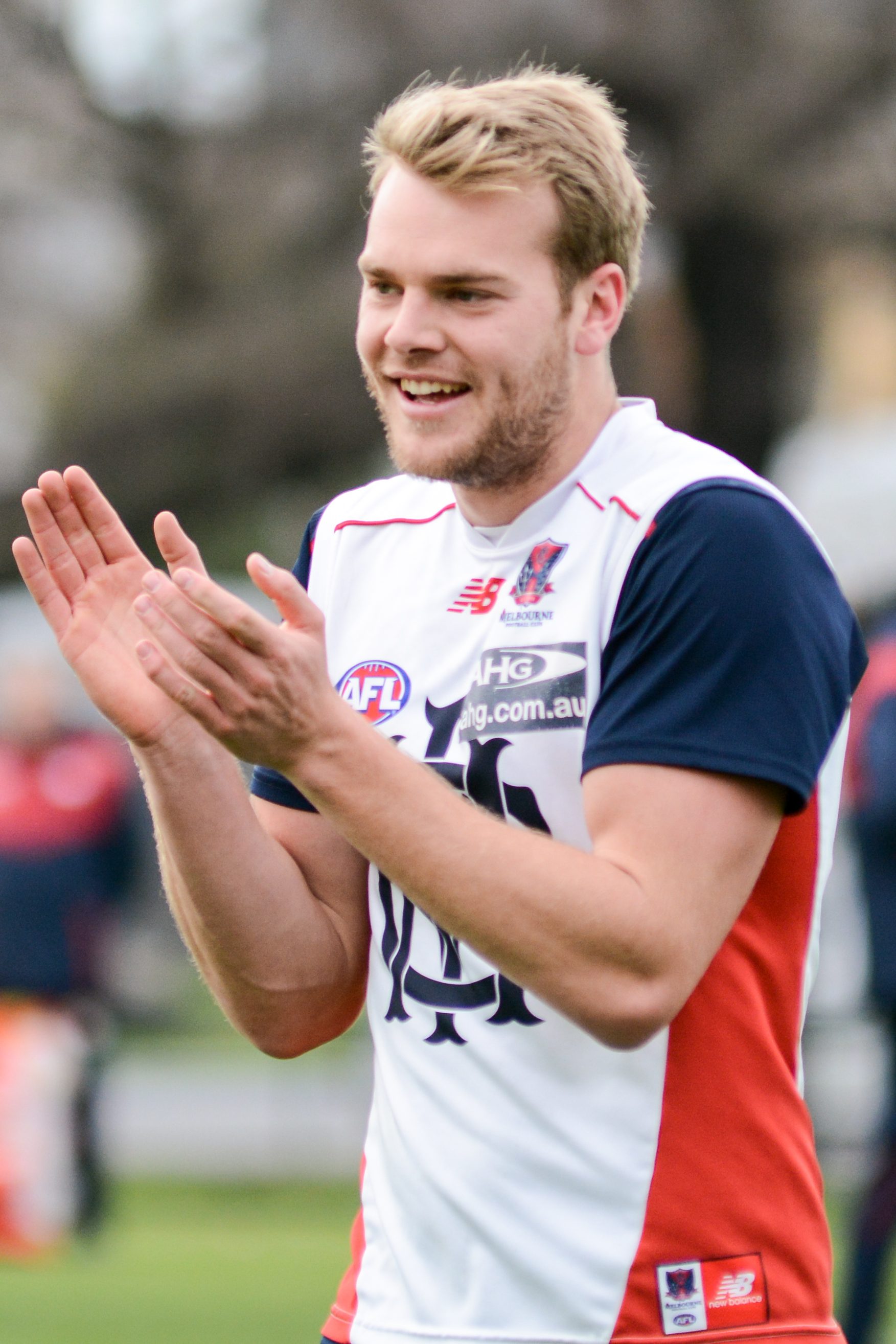
Watts at training in July 2015

With the arrival of new coach, Paul Roos, Watts was assigned a new role in the midfield; after having a strong pre-season, Watts was predicted to play an on-ball role heading into the 2014 NAB Challenge. In the opening round match against St Kilda at Etihad Stadium, he played primarily in the midfield and was named in Melbourne's best players; his new role saw him collect twenty-seven disposals and play with "confidence and flair" according to AFL Media reporter, Peter Ryan, who also claimed Watts "[looked] set for a big year". With not one of Melbourne's three big forwards available to play in the early rounds of the year, he was forced to spend more time in the forward line than initially intended. However, Roos said Watts would not revert to his former role as a permanent forward and would instead spend time in the midfield.

After a promising performance in round one, Watts played inconsistently the next few matches and played with a lack of intensity, according to former Richmond and Western Bulldogs forward, Nathan Brown. Pressure mounted on him with the media debating whether he should be dropped for the round seven match against Adelaide at the Adelaide Oval. Roos defended his position and said Watts would maintain his position in the side, and that he could not understand the public's fixation with Watts and his form. He turned his form around in the seventeen point win against Richmond at the MCG in round nine where he kicked three goals and recorded a career-high eleven marks; he was pivotal in the win and settled into a mid-forward role for the rest of the year.

Watts played every match during the year and despite Paul Roos labelling Watts' season a success, he could not escape the disapproval of the media. Former player and The Age journalist, Matthew Lloyd, described his season as "disappointing", former Melbourne player and SEN reporter, David Schwarz, noted he was "treading water" and said that his season had been "underwhelming", and Leigh Matthews and Lloyd questioned his commitment to the sport. Although his season received mixed reviews, he finished inside the top ten of Melbourne's best and fairest count for the second time in his career, finishing tenth overall.

With the intention of playing the 2015 season in the forward line alongside Jesse Hogan and Chris Dawes, a groin injury hampered Watts' pre-season training for three months heading into the season. He had a strong start to the season recording seventeen disposals, seven marks and three goals in the club's twenty-six point win against Gold Coast at the MCG in round one and was named in Melbourne's best players by AFL Media. After a buoyant start to the season, he quickly found himself facing negativity from the media after the round three loss to Adelaide at the Adelaide Oval where he dropped two marks in quick succession, with one leading to an Adelaide goal. Multiple media figures called for him to be dropped with David Schwarz stating he "might have to sit out a week" and Dermott Brereton professing "you have to make a stand as to what your team stands for, and that means you can't bring him back in until you are convinced he will not do that again"; Jason Dunstall supplemented these statements by noting "he can't relapse into these kind of performances", adding "I don't like using the word, but he looked a little soft at times".

Two weeks later, he played his 100th AFL match in the sixty-eight point loss to Fremantle at the MCG in round five, a game in which he managed just seven disposals; after his milestone match he was condemned by Matthew Lloyd on the Nine Network's Footy Classified, saying "he's been gifted 100 games of AFL football". In the thirty-eight point loss against Sydney at the MCG the next week, he started as the substitute with Paul Roos attempting to ease the burden on Watts, although Roos later admitted starting as the substitute probably increased pressure on Watts. The relentless pressure on Watts saw him omitted the next week for the round seven match against Hawthorn, although it initially appeared he was dropped by the coaching panel, it was later revealed by Paul Roos that Watts asked to be dropped so he could find form playing in the VFL. Leigh Matthews described Watts' decision to drop himself as a shock because it never happened in his twenty years of coaching and he found it difficult to take seriously. Recording twenty-four disposals, eight marks and a goal in the VFL, his performance was described as "solid" by AFL Media journalist, Peter Ryan and he was recalled to the senior side after the one week in the VFL for the thirty-nine point win against the Western Bulldogs at the MCG.

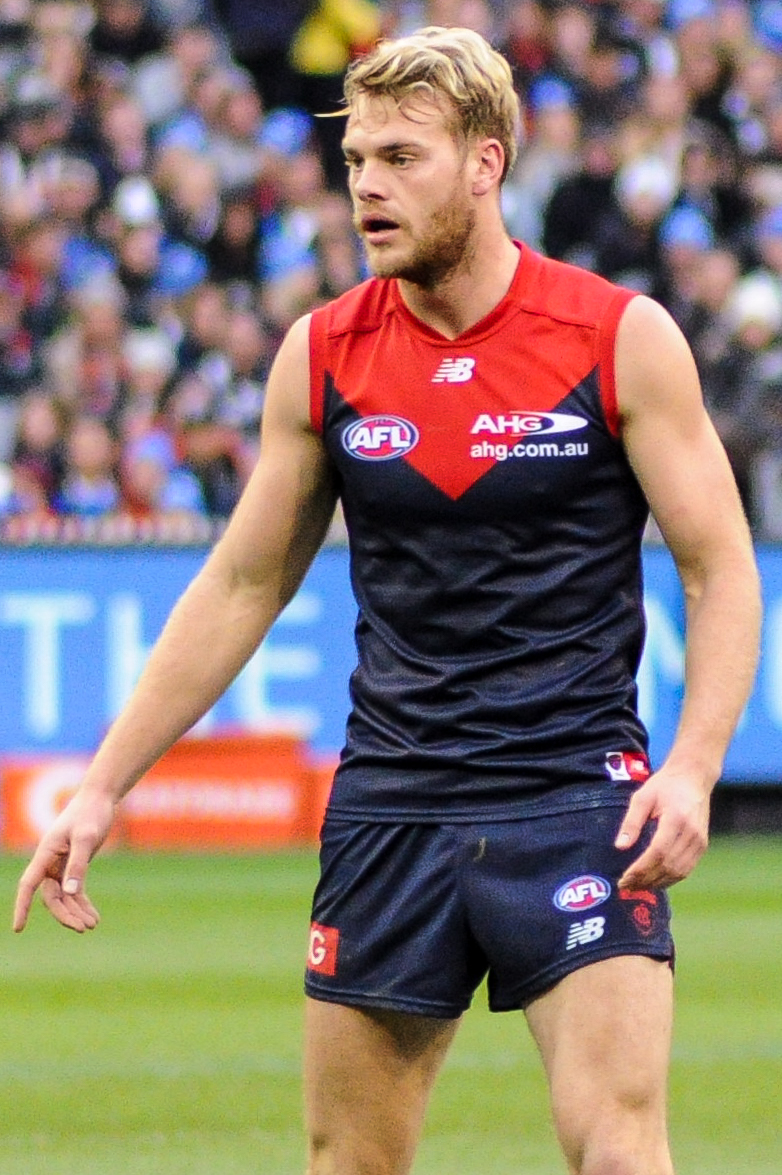
Watts playing for Melbourne in the 2017 Queen's Birthday match.

Watts' return to the AFL saw his form improve, particularly his average disposal count, which increased by six a match in the five weeks from rounds eight to twelve, compared with the first six weeks of the season; he credited the opportunity to play in the VFL as a key reason to his improved form and his mind frame was more "calm and relaxed" heading into matches. He continued his good form playing on both the wing and in the forward line and after his performance in the thirty-seven point win against Collingwood at the MCG in round eighteen where he recorded twenty-six disposals—eleven of which were contested—four marks and a goal, Herald Sun journalist, Chris Vernuccio, stated he was starting to "fulfil his potential and silence the doubters" and The Age journalist, Michael Gleeson, noted he may have finally "turned a corner". The next few weeks saw Melbourne suffer heavy defeats and as Melbourne's form diminished, so did Watts' and he was omitted from the side for the final round clash against Greater Western Sydney at Etihad Stadium. Watts finished the season playing twenty matches in total.

Entering the 2016 season, Watts was in his final year of his contract and would be eligible for free agency at the end of the season if he remained unsigned; before the start of the season, speculation began as to whether he would remain at the club beyond the year or instead explore his free agency options. His first match of the season—the two-point win against Greater Western Sydney at the MCG—was "superb" according to The Age journalist Jon Pierik; he recorded eighteen disposals, ten marks and a goal in the last quarter to help the team turn a twenty-one point deficit into a two-point win. Compared with previous seasons where he would play particularly well in the first match and then lose form quickly, he maintained his good form beyond the first match, which he credited to the team's improved performances.

Watts' positive form was especially apparent in the thirty-five point win against Collingwood at the MCG in round four where he recorded seventeen disposals, eight marks and an equal career-high four goals to receive the maximum three Brownlow votes. The head of football writer at the Herald Sun, Mark Robinson, also attributed his consistency to stability in his position—whereas in previous years he was moved around the ground, even multiple times during a match—he was now used as a permanent forward playing alongside Jesse Hogan. With the late withdrawal of Cameron Pedersen from the team in the sixty-three point victory over Brisbane at the MCG in round nine, Watts was forced to play as the back-up ruckman, which further proved his versatility; the move surprised onlookers, but he was praised by the media, particularly by Fox Sports Australia journalist, Sarah Olle, who noted his athleticism led to a "surprisingly good" result. Being in career best form according to the media, Watts signed a three-year contract extension in July, tying him to the club until the end of the 2019 season.

A week after his contract extension was announced, Watts was crucial in the two-point win against Gold Coast at the MCG in round nineteen when he kicked the winning goal with two minutes left in the match, his third of the match, and took a goal-saving mark in defence with forty-four seconds left on the clock. He was labelled as "the difference" in the match by Fox Sports Australia journalist, Anna Harrington, and Mark Robinson noted his match-winning performance showed great leadership, an area he had previously been criticised as lacking in. His performance in the match earned him two Brownlow votes to be recognised as the second best player on the ground by the field umpires. He played every match for the season and kicked a career-high thirty-eight goals, in addition to achieving career-highs in marks, inside-50s, marks inside-50, and goal assists. His career-best season to date saw him finish inside the top-five of Melbourne's best and fairest for the first time in his career, finishing fifth overall, and he was named in the AFL Media's team of the week three times during the season.

=== 2018–2020: Move to Port Adelaide ===
Watts was traded to the Port Adelaide Football Club during the 2017 trade period. In September 2020, Watts announced his retirement, effective immediately, on the eve of Port Adelaide's 2020 finals campaign.

== Playing style ==
As a junior, Watts played in the forward line as a strong-marking tall and was an accurate shot on goal. Regarded as an incredibly quick player for his height, especially over the first twenty metres, his speed and athleticism saw him dominate in the forward line as a junior. After struggling to replicate his form from the juniors in the AFL, he was trialled as a defender in 2011 by then senior-coach, Dean Bailey, playing primarily as the loose man in defence. Bailey intended on using him as both a defender and forward; he recognised Watts would not be the main key forward at the club, which was intended when he was drafted, but when playing in the forward line, he would instead be used as a floating forward.

He played a new role in 2012 under Mark Neeld in defence, where he was highly praised for his ability to read the play and take intercept marks. He played in defence for the duration of Neeld's tenure, until Neeld was sacked and replaced by Neil Craig in the middle of 2013 with Craig electing to return Watts to the forward line. After playing in the forward line and in defence, incoming coach in 2014, Paul Roos, saw an opportunity for Watts to play in the midfield due to his body size and elite kicking, in addition to the club needing an influx of midfielders. After the desperate need for midfielders dissipated, Watts returned to a half-forward role in the middle of 2014; he played as a half-forward throughout Roos' coaching term and was used as a back-up ruckman in 2016.

Trialled in nearly every position on the ground, Watts is known for his versatility on the field and is regarded as a utility, who can play multiple positions during a match. Despite this versatility, he does not have a strong endurance base and instead plays in bursts; he admitted in 2014 that he struggled for consistency early in his career due to becoming too tired during matches, and from then on, he utilised the interchange bench more often during a match so he could become a "burst player". Although he is not a strong endurance runner, he has been compared to two-time Brownlow Medallist, Adam Goodes, by The Age journalist, Michael Gleeson, noting that both did not have great endurance but could use their speed to impact matches. Furthermore, Watts acknowledged that he modelled his playing style on Hawthorn's Jack Gunston, who is regarded as one of the most damaging forwards in the league.

== Criticism ==
Considered to be one of the most maligned players in the Melbourne Football Club's history, Watts' career was filled with criticism from the media, fans, and members of the football industry. The seeds for the ongoing criticism were planted when he was announced as the number one draft pick in the 2008 AFL draft; the hype surrounding him meant that the expectations placed on him before he had even played a match were going to be difficult to live up to. Some of these lofty expectations included being seen as the replacement for a club champion, David Neitz, who is the club's games and goals record holder; being labelled as a potential future captain; being one of the team's most valuable players before he had even played an AFL match, with the club unable to afford him being injured; and claims he was the "great white hope" who would lift the club off the bottom of the ladder.

With the number-one draft pick described as a "poisoned chalice" by the Herald Sun journalist Jon Anderson, Watts has been continually compared to the players who were drafted after him and who rivalled him for the number-one pick, especially the number-two pick, Nic Naitanui. The choice to choose Watts over Naitanui has been one of the most talked-about draft decisions, with many deeming the decision to be incorrect, especially considering Naitanui's impact for West Coast, which included earning multiple All-Australian honours including one in just his fourth season. This would be something which continued throughout his career, emphasised more so by Watts never being able to beat Naitanui or West Coast in his career. Daniel Rich at the time was also considered a potential first pick; with Rich winning the AFL Rising Star in his first year, the choice by Melbourne to recruit Watts was further questioned. Despite the comparisons to other players, many people in the media believe the label of "number-one draft pick" placed too much unfair expectation on Watts, which he would never be able to live up to; some of these people include former Richmond and Western Bulldogs player Nathan Brown, The Age journalists Greg Baum and Brent Diamond, and former coaches Mark Neeld and Paul Roos, who both said being the number-one draft pick set him up to fail.

It took Watts three months into his first season before he made his debut with the club, choosing their biggest home-and-away match of the year to name him for his debut, the Queen's Birthday clash against Collingwood. The fanfare and expectation the club placed on him for his debut has led to long-term criticism of the club about how they mismanaged his first match; five years after his debut, Paul Roos said he was appalled at how the club handled him for his debut. His first touch of the football saw him "gang tackled" by three Collingwood players, with some suggesting the tackle "ruined him"; a teammate on the day, Russell Robertson, dispelled these thoughts and said the team did not do enough to protect him, with the Collingwood captain at the time, Nick Maxwell, admitting in 2016 that the hype surrounding Watts did lead them to purposely be rougher with him than a standard player to ensure they limited his impact. Despite then-senior coach, Dean Bailey, claiming he was ready to play and keeping him in the team for three weeks, the football industry disagreed and scrutinised the club for using him as a marketing tool to provide a sense of hope for fans rather than doing what was best for Watts' development.

With much of the criticism placed on the club during his first year, the scrutiny turned to Watts during the next few seasons, as it was deemed that he was not living up to his potential or the public's expectations. This was partly due to Watts displaying a lack of urgency and work-rate on the field, according to former players Wayne Carey, Garry Lyon and coach Mick Malthouse. He played the early parts of his career in different positions, which Garry Lyon wrote led to an instability in his game and was a reason for why he, at times, lacked confidence and self-belief in his abilities. He was often very quickly scrutinised when he played poorly, and was often one of the first players to be blamed when the team played a bad match, which led to Paul Roos questioning why the public had such a fixation with Watts' form. He was also plagued with being known as the "great white hope" as soon as he was drafted; and, due to the club trailing near the bottom of the ladder from 2009 to 2015 and experiencing failed rebuilds, Watts was symbolically seen as a poster boy for Melbourne's failures during this period.

The overall mismanagement of Watts by the club and general criticism from the media led to multiple media personalities calling for him to be traded, including Damian Barrett and Peter Ryan in 2013, Ben McKay and Mark Robinson in 2014, and Jon Pierik and Matt Murnane in 2015. The former list manager at Hawthorn, Chris Pelchen, wrote that Watts had become the greatest example of a list management trap, whereby the club's drafting decisions would look "silly" if they traded him. Mark Robinson also noted that social media is the AFL's most damaging opponent with the emergence of the platform further exposing players to public criticism and that there was not a name Watts had not been called on Facebook and Twitter. Watts had his career-best season in 2016 which saw the criticism turning to praise; Watts credited his career turnaround to outgoing coach, Paul Roos.

== Statistics ==
Statistics are correct to the end of the 2017 season

Legend
G	Goals	K	Kicks	D	Disposals	T	Tackles
B	Behinds	H	Handballs	M	Marks

Season	Team	No.	Games	Totals							Averages (per game)						
Season	Team	No.	Games	G	B	K	H	D	M	T	G	B	K	H	D	M	T
2009	Melbourne	4	3	2	2	16	11	27	9	1	0.7	0.7	5.3	3.7	9.0	3.0	0.3
2010	Melbourne	4	15	10	4	115	74	189	70	15	0.7	0.4	7.7	4.9	12.6	4.7	1.0
2011	Melbourne	4	22	21	11	198	157	355	124	53	1.0	0.5	9.0	7.1	16.1	5.5	2.4
2012	Melbourne	4	15	5	1	149	129	278	83	23	0.3	0.1	9.9	8.6	18.5	5.5	1.5
2013	Melbourne	4	18	22	12	157	110	267	95	29	1.2	0.7	8.7	6.1	14.8	5.3	1.6
2014	Melbourne	4	22	13	8	200	185	385	109	58	0.6	0.4	9.1	8.4	17.5	5.0	2.6
2015	Melbourne	4	20	10	6	169	156	325	102	29	0.5	0.3	8.5	7.8	16.3	5.1	1.5
2016	Melbourne	4	22	38	18	226	125	351	139	39	1.7	0.8	10.3	5.7	16.0	6.3	1.8
2017	Melbourne	4	16	22	9	129	122	251	77	42	1.4	0.6	8.1	7.6	15.7	4.8	2.6
Career			153	143	71	1359	1069	2428	808	302	0.9	0.5	8.9	7.0	14.9	5.3	2.0

== Other work ==
In December 2015, Watts and two of his close friends, Adam Walsh and Jack Turner, started a men's clothing line called Skwosh which focuses primarily on swimming trunks. The designs are described as being "loud, fun and bright". He has also spent time away from football working with charities, in particular Cancer Council Australia.
