= Chris Connolly =

Chris or Christopher Connolly may refer to:

- Chris Connolly (footballer) (born 1963), Australian rules footballer, coach and administrator
- Chris Connolly (ice hockey) (born 1987), American ice hockey forward

== See also ==
- Chris Connelly (disambiguation)
- Chris Conley (disambiguation)
