= Jordie McKenzie =

Australian rules footballer and cricketer

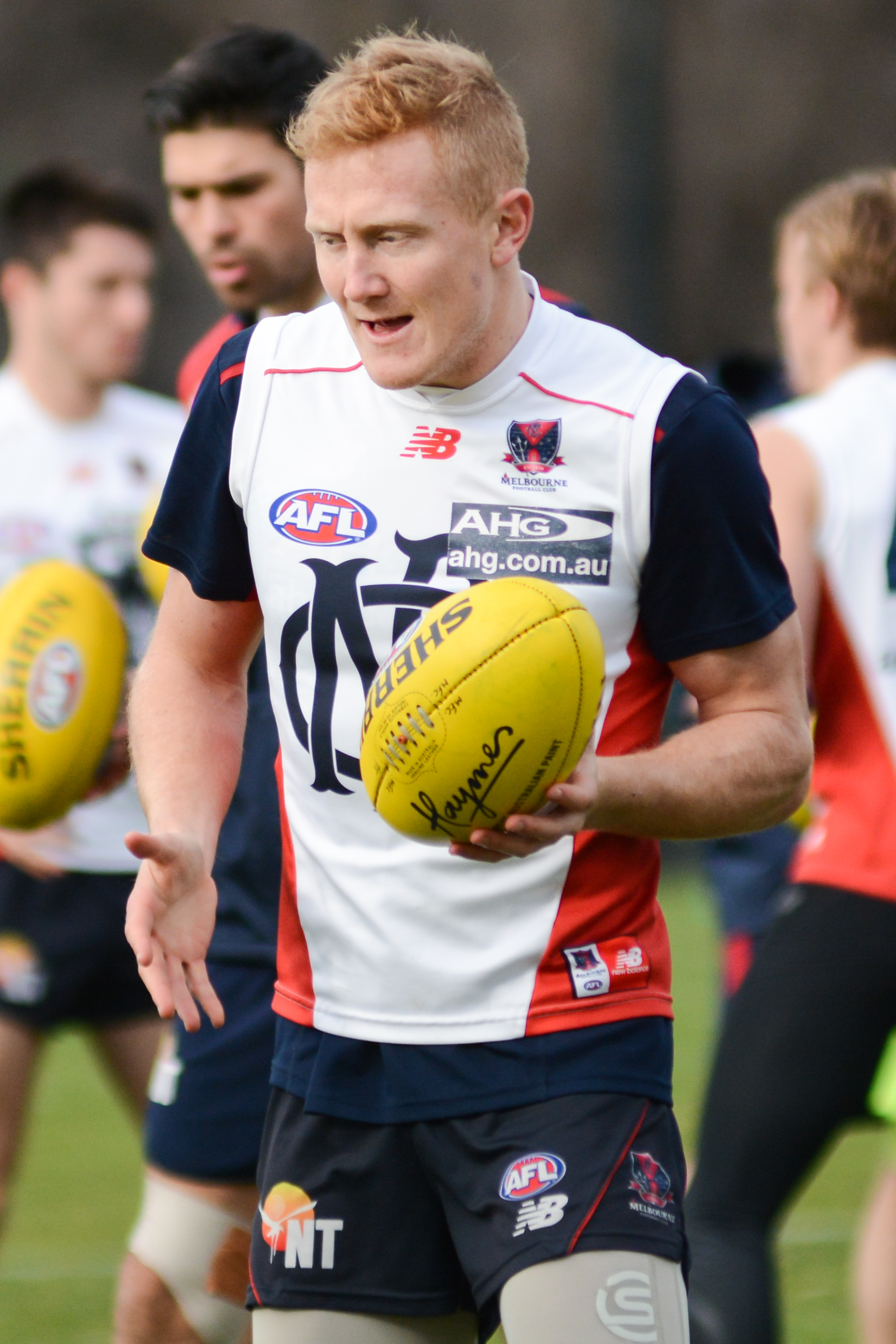
- McKenzie at training during July 2015

Personal information
- Full name: Jordie McKenzie
- Born: 21 June 1990 (age 36); Terang, Victoria
- Original team: Geelong Falcons
- Draft: No. 1, 2009 rookie draft
- Debut: Round 17, 2009, Melbourne vs. Sydney, at Manuka Oval
- Height: 186 cm (6 ft 1 in)
- Weight: 71 kg (157 lb)
- Position: Midfielder

Playing career^{1}
| Years | Club | Games (Goals) |
| 2009–2015 | Melbourne | 79 (10) |
- ^{1} Playing statistics correct to the end of 2015.

Jordie McKenzie (born 21 June 1990) is an Australian cricketer and former Australian rules footballer who played for the Melbourne Football Club in the Australian Football League (AFL). In November 2015, he signed with the North Adelaide Football Club in the South Australian National Football League (SANFL).

McKenzie is currently (2024)senior coach of Collegians in the Victorian Amateur Football Association.

== Early life ==
McKenzie grew up in the rural Victorian town of Terang. Growing up he supported the West Coast Eagles. McKenzie played for the Geelong Falcons in the TAC Cup, a team well known for producing many AFL players. He had an injury-interrupted two seasons for the Falcons due to corrective hip surgery, not playing at all in 2007 and playing only 10 games in 2008.

== AFL career ==
McKenzie was overlooked in the 2008 AFL draft, but after being invited to train with the Melbourne Football Club for two weeks he was taken by the Demons with the first selection in the 2009 Rookie Draft.

After playing well for the Demons' VFL-affiliate side, the Casey Scorpions, for the first half of the 2009 season, McKenzie was rewarded by being promoted to the club's senior list on 23 July 2009. McKenzie made his debut for Melbourne in round 17, 2009 against the Sydney Swans in Canberra at Manuka Oval. He played two more games for the Demons in 2009, in rounds 21 and 22, with his best game coming against Carlton, when he amassed 16 disposals and laid eight tackles.

During the offseason McKenzie was the subject of interest from Adelaide. Adelaide coach Neil Craig offered him a spot on the Crows' senior list, whereas Melbourne could only offer McKenzie a spot on their rookie list, with the chance that he might be promoted to the senior list during the year. McKenzie, however, chose to repay the Demons for the faith they had put in him by recruiting him originally, and he stayed with Melbourne, despite the possibility of reduced opportunities.

The fear that McKenzie would have a lack of opportunities was soon relieved as he was promoted to the senior list prior to the beginning of the 2010 season, due to Max Gawn's long-term injury. McKenzie became a mainstay of the Melbourne midfield during the season. Along with other young players, such as Jack Watts, Jordan Gysberts and Jack Trengove, he was considered to be the future of the club. McKenzie was noted for his stoppage work, particularly his clearances and tackling ability.

Despite not receiving a Rising Star nomination throughout the year, McKenzie finished the 2010 season by winning Melbourne's Coach's Award. As a reward for his performance during the season, McKenzie was elevated to Melbourne's senior list with the 81st selection in the 2010 AFL draft.

He was delisted at the conclusion of the 2015 season.

== SANFL career ==
On 17 November 2015, it was announced that McKenzie had signed with North Adelaide in the South Australian National Football League (SANFL) for the 2016 season.

== Cricket career ==
McKenzie was drafted to Brighton District in a club coup that cost South African import Dylan Blignaut. In his first season in 2020, McKenzie averaged 17, with a top score of 24 batting at 7 in a win over Chelsea.

== Statistics ==
Legend
| G | Goals | K | Kicks | D | Disposals | T | Tackles |
| B | Behinds | H | Handballs | M | Marks |

| Season | Team | No. | Games | Totals | | | | | | | Averages (per game) | | | | | | |
| Season | Team | No. | Games | G | B | K | H | D | M | T | G | B | K | H | D | M | T |
|---|---|---|---|---|---|---|---|---|---|---|---|---|---|---|---|---|---|
| 2009 | Melbourne | 49 | 3 | 0 | 0 | 17 | 25 | 42 | 8 | 11 | 0.0 | 0.0 | 5.7 | 8.3 | 14.0 | 2.7 | 3.7 |
| 2010 | Melbourne | 13 | 19 | 2 | 1 | 126 | 224 | 350 | 46 | 128 | 0.1 | 0.1 | 6.6 | 11.8 | 18.4 | 2.4 | 6.7 |
| 2011 | Melbourne | 13 | 15 | 2 | 0 | 83 | 217 | 300 | 24 | 100 | 0.1 | 0.0 | 5.5 | 14.5 | 20.0 | 1.6 | 6.7 |
| 2012 | Melbourne | 13 | 20 | 3 | 2 | 167 | 174 | 341 | 30 | 116 | 0.2 | 0.1 | 8.4 | 8.7 | 17.1 | 1.5 | 5.8 |
| 2013 | Melbourne | 13 | 12 | 3 | 1 | 60 | 133 | 193 | 20 | 50 | 0.3 | 0.1 | 5.0 | 11.1 | 16.1 | 1.7 | 4.2 |
| 2014 | Melbourne | 13 | 9 | 0 | 2 | 40 | 81 | 121 | 10 | 27 | 0.0 | 0.2 | 4.4 | 9.0 | 13.4 | 1.1 | 3.0 |
| 2015 | Melbourne | 13 | 1 | 0 | 1 | 3 | 6 | 9 | 0 | 0 | 0.0 | 1.0 | 3.0 | 6.0 | 9.0 | 0.0 | 0.0 |
| Career | | | 79 | 10 | 7 | 496 | 860 | 1356 | 138 | 432 | 0.1 | 0.1 | 6.3 | 10.9 | 17.2 | 1.8 | 5.5 |
