= Lee Harding (disambiguation) =

Lee Harding is a singer.

Lee or Leigh Harding may also refer to:

- Lee Harding (writer)
- Leigh Harding, footballer
