= Chris Connelly =

Chris or Christopher Connelly may refer to:

- Christopher Connelly (1941–1988), American actor
- Chris Connelly (journalist) (born 1957), American reporter for MTV News and ESPN
- Chris Connelly (musician) (born 1964), Scottish guitarist, vocalist and songwriter

== See also ==
- Chris Conley (disambiguation)
- Chris Connolly (disambiguation)
