= Danny Stevens (Australian footballer) =

Australian rules footballer and coach

Personal information
- Full name: Daniel Stevens
- Born: 10 November 1976 (age 49)
- Original team: Northern Knights
- Draft: 52nd, 1994 AFL draft
- Height: 180 cm (5 ft 11 in)
- Weight: 82 kg (181 lb)

Playing career^{1}
Years	Club	Games (Goals)
1996–1999	North Melbourne	15 (7)
- ^{1} Playing statistics correct to the end of 1999.

Daniel "Danny" Stevens (born 10 November 1976) is a former Australian rules footballer who played with North Melbourne in the Australian Football League (AFL) during the 1990s.

Although he played his early football at St Marys Greensborough, it was from the Northern Knights that Stevens was recruited from in the 1994 AFL draft. The brother of Nick Stevens, he played his football as a wingman and half forward flanker. After playing just once in North Melbourne's premiership year of 1996, Stevens made his way back into the side late in the 1997 season and participated in two finals. He could however only manage six games over the next two seasons and was delisted.

Stevens was a member of the first Central District SANFL premiership team in 2000. Since his stint at Tatura in the Goulburn Valley Football Netball League, Stevens has been heavily involved in coaching throughout New South Wales. He was the assistant coach of the NSW/ACT Rams at the 2008 AFL Under 18 Championships.
