= Chris Conley =

Chris Conley may refer to:

- Chris Conley (musician) (born 1980), American singer and guitarist with the rock band Saves the Day
- Chris Conley (American football) (born 1992), American football wide receiver

== See also ==
- Chris Connelly (disambiguation)
- Chris Connolly (disambiguation)
