= 2008 AFL Under 18 Championships =

Youth Australian rules football competition

- Teams: 8

Division 1
- Teams: 4
- Champions: Vic Metro
- Larke Medal: Jack Watts

Division 2
- Teams: 4
- Champions: Tasmania
- Hunter Harrison Medal: Mitch Robinson

The 2008 AFL Under 18 Championships is the 2008 series of the AFL Under 18 Championships, a state and territory based Australian rules football competition which showcase the best junior footballers in Australia, primarily with the aim for them to be drafted into the Australian Football League.

The competition is split into two divisions. The major football states of Victoria (split into separate Country and Metropolitan teams), South Australia and Western Australia are in Division 1, with the smaller football states of Northern Territory, NSW/ACT, Tasmania and Queensland are in Division 2. Unlike previous years, in 2008 the top two teams from the Division 2 competition advanced to be part of Division 1.

Division 2 games were played as a qualifying series over a week in May in Melbourne, whereas Division 1 will be played mainly as curtain-raisers before AFL matches in late May and early June.

== Division 2 qualifying series ==
DATE	HOME TEAM	SCORE	AWAY TEAM	SCORE	VENUE	TIME
Wed 7/5	Northern Territory	7-4(46)	NSW/ACT	11-8(74)	Casey Fields	11:15 am
Wed 7/5	Tasmania	12-5(77)	Queensland	7-11(53)	Casey Fields	1:30 pm
Sat 10/5	Tasmania	11-11(77)	Northern Territory	10-4(64)	Melbourne Cricket Ground	2:20 pm
Sat 10/5	NSW/ACT	9-13(67)	Queensland	5-6(36)	Melbourne Cricket Ground	4:20 pm
Tue 13/5	NSW/ACT	8-7(55)	Tasmania	13-6(84)	Casey Fields	10:15 am
Tue 13/5	Northern Territory	14-7(91)	Queensland	5-7(37)	Casey Fields	12:30 pm

Division 2 Table

TEAM	WON	LOST	FOR	AGAINST	PERCENTAGE
Tasmania	3	0	238	172	138.37%
NSW/ACT	2	1	196	166	118.07%
Northern Territory	1	2	201	188	106.91%
Queensland	0	3	126	235	53.62%

Tasmania is the No.1 Qualifier and NSW/ACT is the No.2 Qualifier into Division 1.

Mitch Robinson from Tasmania won the Hunter-Harrison Medal as best player in Division 2.

== Division 1 ==
In 2008 Division One was extended from 3 rounds to 5 rounds with the addition of the top 2 teams from Division Two.

Fox Sports 1 telecast the final round of games live from the Telstra Dome on Wednesday 9 July from 10 am EST.

Melbourne Radio Station 3XX 1611AM broadcast games played in Melbourne on Wednesday 9 July

DATE	HOME TEAM	SCORE	AWAY TEAM	SCORE	VENUE	TIME
Sun 25/5	Victoria Country	11-7(73)	Victoria Metro	12-4(76)	Melbourne Cricket Ground	11:10 am
Sat 31/5	South Australia	17-6(108)	Tasmania	9-9(63)	Adelaide Oval	10:55 am
Sun 1/6	Western Australia	15-7(97)	NSW/ACT	4-3(27)	Subiaco Oval	11:30 am
Sat 7/6	NSW/ACT	11-6(72)	Victoria Country	10-7(67)	Henson Park	12:30 pm
Sun 8/6	South Australia	4-13(37)	Western Australia	15-12(102)	AAMI Stadium	1:25 pm
Mon 9/6	Tasmania	1-7(13)	Victoria Metro	12-8(80)	Bellerive Oval	12:35 pm
Sat 14/6	Tasmania	9-8(62)	NSW/ACT	11-8(74)	Aurora Stadium	12:30 pm
Sat 21/6	Western Australia	6-7(43)	Victoria Country	11-4(70)	Subiaco Oval	2:30 pm
Sun 22/6	South Australia	8-6(54)	Victoria Metro	17-5(107)	Adelaide Oval	1 pm
Sat 5/7	Tasmania	6-4(40)	Western Australia	14-16(100)	Casey Fields	10 am
Sat 5/7	Victoria Country	9-10(64)	South Australia	14-14(98)	Casey Fields	12:15 pm
Sat 5/7	Victoria Metro	11-14(80)	NSW/ACT	4-5(29)	Casey Fields	2:30 pm
Wed 9/7	South Australia	20-12(132)	NSW/ACT	8-4(52)	Telstra Dome	10:05 am
Wed 9/7	Tasmania	6-4(40)	Victoria Country	22-6(138)	Telstra Dome	12:15 pm
Wed 9/7	Victoria Metro	14-9(93)	Western Australia	9-10(64)	Telstra Dome	2:30 pm

Division 1 Table

TEAM	WON	LOST	FOR	AGAINST	PERCENTAGE
Victoria Metro	5	0	436	233	187.12%
Western Australia	3	2	406	267	152.06%
South Australia	3	2	429	388	110.57%
Victoria Country	2	3	412	329	125.23%
NSW/ACT	2	3	254	438	57.99%
Tasmania	0	5	218	500	43.60%

The Larke Medal (Best Player in Div 1) was awarded to Jack Watts (Victoria Metro).

== 2008 AFL Under 18 All-Australian team ==
The 2008 Under 18 All-Australian team was announced following the conclusion of the 2008 AFL National Under 18 Championships.

2008 AFL Under 18 All-Australian team
B:	Nick Suban (Victoria Country)	Michael Hurley (Victoria Metro)	Clancee Pearce (Western Australia)
HB:	Stephen Hill (Western Australia)	Jordan Lisle (Victoria Metro)	Rhys O'Keefe (South Australia)
C:	Mitch Robinson (Tasmania)	Matt De Boer (Western Australia)	David Zaharakis (Victoria Metro)
HF:	Hamish Hartlett (South Australia)	Lewis Johnston (South Australia)	Tom Scully (Victoria Metro)
F:	Ty Vickery (Victoria Metro)	Jack Watts (Victoria Metro)	Michael Walters (Western Australia)
Foll:	Nicholas Naitanui (Western Australia)	Jack Ziebell (Victoria Country)	Ranga Ediriwickrama (NSW/ACT)
Int:	Daniel Rich (Western Australia)	Shaun McKernan (Victoria Metro)	Kade Klemke (NSW/ACT)
Int:	Steele Sidebottom (Victoria Country)		
Coach:	David Dickson (Victoria Metro) — Assistant coach: Danny Stevens (NSW/ACT)		
