= Liam Jurrah =

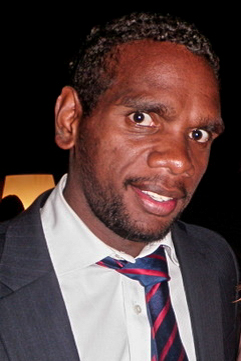
- Jurrah in August 2009

Personal information
- Full name: Liam Jungarrayi Jurrah
- Nicknames: LJ, the Warlpiri Wizard, the Cougar
- Born: 22 September 1988 (age 38)
- Original team: Yuendumu Magpies (CAFL) / Nightcliff (NTFL)
- Draft: 1st overall, 2009 Pre-Season Draft; Melbourne
- Height: 188 cm (6 ft 2 in)
- Weight: 84 kg (185 lb)
- Position: Forward

Playing career^{1}
Years	Club	Games (Goals)
2009–2012	Melbourne	36 (81)
- ^{1} Playing statistics correct to the end of 2012.

Career highlights
- Melbourne leading goalkicker: 2011; Mark of the Year: 2010; Harold Ball Memorial Trophy: 2009; AFL Rising Star nominee: 2009

Liam Jungarrayi Jurrah (born 22 September 1988) is a former professional Australian rules footballer who played with the Melbourne Football Club in the Australian Football League (AFL).

Jurrah is also known as "Jungarrayi", an initiated member of the Warlpiri people who are based in Yuendumu, a small and remote Indigenous Australian community 300 km north-west of Alice Springs in the Northern Territory.

He is the first indigenous person from a remote community in Central Australia to have played senior football in the AFL.

== Early life ==
Jurrah was born in Yuendumu to mother Corrina and father Leo Japaljarri Jurrah (a legend in Yuendumu football). Amongst many others, as per Warlpiri tradition, his Grandmother Cecily was also instrumental in his upbringing. During his childhood Jurrah grew up speaking four different indigenous Australian languages as well as learning English and had never swum in the ocean. Jurrah began playing Australian rules football from a very young age, playing most of his football at the local red dirt Yuendumu oval and at Football carnivals throughout the Central Australian desert (Sports Weekends) against other remote communities such as Papunya, Lajamanu (home of his cousin Liam Patrick) and Hermannsburg. In his mid-teens he began following his father 600 kilometres each week to play for Yuendumu in the Alice Springs Central Australian Football League. Jurrah was involved in the 2005 Under 17, 2005,07,08 A Grade premiership seasons with the Yuendumu Magpies. Also during his mid-teens Jurrah began acting as a volunteer with the Mt Theo Program under its Jaru Pirrjirdi youth development program, which saw him helping to run youth activities such as sport, bush trips and discos for Yuendumu youth. His leadership and strength saw him rapidly progress through this program to begin acting as a youth mentor helping other Warlpiri young men in Yuendumu.

Jurrah was first brought to Melbourne in 2007 as a guest of a Collingwood coterie group called the Industrial Magpies when he watched his first match at the famous Melbourne Cricket Ground. He returned to Melbourne in 2008 where he was played by Collingwood in the Victorian Football League for four games and showed great athleticism and talent. Later that year he represented Victoria (VFL) against South Australia (SANFL). His stay in Melbourne was cut short by his need to return to Yuendumu for family responsibilities to support a dying friend.

In September 2008 he won the Everingham Medal as the best player in the inaugural combined competition CAFL Grand Final, with his four first-quarter goals helping to set up Yuendumu's premiership victory. This historic premiership was in the new combined competition of the 'town' and 'country' sides who had previously played separately in Alice Springs. It also marked the culmination of a great era in Yuendumu football having won Senior 'Ngurratjuta Country Cup' premierships in 2003-04-05 and 2007 before the combined comp CAFL premiership in 2008. Following the CAFL season Jurrah also played for Nightcliff in the Northern Territory Football League where he kicked five goals in his last game and AFL talent scouts first identified him – Aaron Davey also noticed him at this time and spoke to Melbourne recruiting staff. Jurrah returned to Melbourne in December, where he was pursued by numerous AFL clubs including the North Melbourne Football Club where he trained

Jurrah was later nominated for the AFL Pre-Season Draft by former Collingwood player Rupert Betheras, and was given special dispensation to nominate, despite not nominating for the previous National Draft.

== AFL career ==
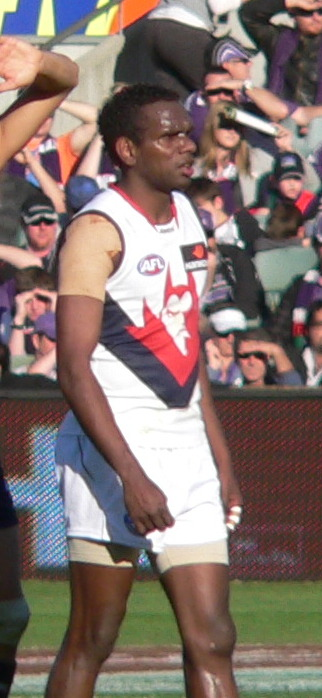
Jurrah playing for Melbourne at Subiaco Oval in July 2010

Jurrah was recruited by Melbourne from the Yuendumu Magpies (CAFL) with the first selection in the 2009 preseason draft.

Jurrah spent his first year in Melbourne living with friends and then with his partner, as well as fellow Melbourne player Austin Wonaeamirri.

Prior to the 2009 AFL season, Jurrah was named to play for the Indigenous All-Stars representative side in a pre-season match against Adelaide in Darwin.

His senior indigenous teammates at Melbourne, Aaron Davey, Matthew Whelan (both from Darwin) and Austin Wonaeamirri (from the Tiwi Islands), all played major roles in assisting Jurrah to adapt to life in Melbourne.

In round 12 of the 2009 AFL season Jurrah made his AFL debut against Essendon at Etihad Stadium on Friday Night Football. He kicked a remarkable goal whilst falling to the ground after attempting a specky in the goalsquare and also had two long kicks at goal touched on the line. In Melbourne's round 15 victory over Port Adelaide, Jurrah scored four goals and assisted in multiple other goals for which he was rewarded with an AFL Rising Star nomination. While the Demons struggled for success on the field he became a shining light for supporters. He was given the moniker "Warlpiri Wizard" for his scintillating style of play. He carries on the tradition of highly skilled indigenous forwards set by the original Demon "Wizard" Jeff Farmer.

In November 2009, Jurrah returned to Yuendumu with the Melbourne president Jim Stynes and Channel 7's Tim Watson. The trip was a chance for Jurrah's family and friends at Yuendumu to celebrate his achievement and a chance for the Melbourne Football Club to see where Jurrah had come from. A story about the visit was aired on Channel 7's Sunday Night program.

Close to the start of the 2010 season, Jurrah required surgery for a dislocation of his shoulder. The injury was caused by an awkward fall during a practice match with the Adelaide Crows. Shortly after, Chris Connolly from the Melbourne Football Club announced that Jurrah would be out for approximately 16 weeks.

Jurrah made a successful return to the senior Melbourne team, after spending several weeks playing with Melbourne's VFL affiliate the Casey Scorpions, kicking two goals in the Demons' round 15 win against Essendon.

== Legal issues ==
In March 2012 Jurrah was charged over an alleged machete attack at an Alice Springs town camp. He was subsequently found not guilty in March 2013.

In January 2013 Jurrah was charged with drink driving in Adelaide after recording a blood alcohol content of 0.27%. He failed to attend his court hearing in March 2013. The case was subsequently finalised in his absence, with Jurrah being fined and banned from driving for two years.

In March 2013 Jurrah was charged with four counts of aggravated assault in Alice Springs, he subsequently pleaded guilty to one count of unlawful assault, and was sentenced to six months in jail time.

In December 2013 Jurrah was charged with driving offences after being involved in a high-speed police chase.

In April 2014 Jurrah was charged with aggravated assault for attacking a woman, causing her harm, and allegedly making threats with a tyre iron and a knife.

In August 2022 Jurrah was charged after allegedly breaking into a house and assaulting a woman with a machete and is currently in custody awaiting a court hearing on October 13 2022.

== Achievements ==
=== Football ===
- AFL Rising Star nomination: Round 15, 2009
- Harold Ball Memorial Trophy, Melbourne FC best first-year player, 2009
- 2010 Mark of the Year winner
- 2011 Melbourne FC leading goalkicker (40)

=== Other ===
- Northern Territory Young Australian of the Year 2010
