= Tom McNamara (footballer, born 1990) =

Australian rules footballer (born 1990)

Personal information
- Full name: Tom McNamara
- Born: 29 April 1990 (age 36)
- Original team: South Adelaide (SANFL)
- Draft: No. 66, 2007 AFL draft
- Height: 186 cm (6 ft 1 in)
- Weight: 84 kg (185 lb)
- Position: Defender

Playing career^{1}
Years	Club	Games (Goals)
2008–2011	Melbourne	4 (1)
- ^{1} Playing statistics correct to the end of 2011.

Tom McNamara (born 29 April 1990) is an Australian rules footballer who played in the Australian Football League (AFL).

Taken at pick number 66 by the Melbourne Demons in the 2007 AFL National Draft, McNamara played as a tall defender. He was recruited from South Australian National Football League (SANFL) club South Adelaide, and was an AIS/AFL Academy graduate. He was the youngest player selected in the draft.

McNamara made his senior AFL debut in 2009 and played three games for the season, but at the end of the following season, having failed to play a game in 2010, McNamara was delisted by Melbourne. He was, however, subsequently redrafted by the Demons in the Rookie Draft, only months later. McNamara played only one senior match in 2011 and was again delisted at season's end.
