= Chris Connolly (footballer) =

Australian rules footballer, born 1963

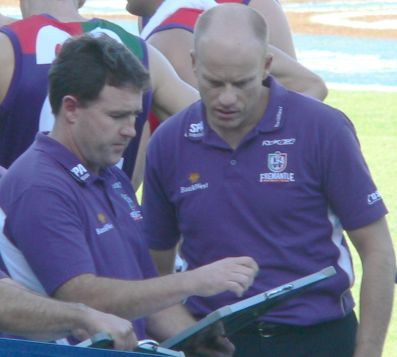
- Chris Connolly (left) with Michael Broadbridge

Personal information
- Born: 23 March 1963 (age 63)
- Original team: Shepparton United (GVFL)
- Height: 175 cm (5 ft 9 in)
- Weight: 76 kg (168 lb)

Playing career^{1}
Years	Club	Games (Goals)
1982–1989	Melbourne	84 (38)

Coaching career
Years	Club	Games (W–L–D)
2001	Hawthorn	1 (1–0–0)
2002–2007	Fremantle	129 (67–62–0)
Total		130 (68–62–0)
- ^{1} Playing statistics correct to the end of 1989.

Chris Connolly (born 25 March 1963) is a former Australian rules football player, coach and administrator, most notable for his six years as senior coach of the Fremantle Football Club in the Australian Football League.

== Playing career ==
=== Melbourne Football Club ===
During his playing career with the Melbourne Football Club, Connolly played 84 games and kicked 38 goals as a midfielder. He played from 1982 to 1987, and in 1989, with his career being interrupted and ultimately cut short by knee injuries.

=== Playing career timeline ===
- 1978 – captain of Goulburn Valley schoolboys side, winners of Under 15 Victorian State Championships
- 1979–1980 – Victorian Under 17 Teal Cup representative, Victorian vice-captain, 1980
- 1980 – senior premiership with Shepparton United
- 1981 – Melbourne Football Club Under 19 premiership
- 1982 – Melbourne Football Club Under 19 captain and Club Champion
- 1982–1990 – Melbourne Football Club senior player
- 1983, 1985, 1986 – fourth in Club Championship
- 1987 and 1990 – knee reconstructions
- 1990 – retired from the Melbourne Football Club.
- 1991 – made a Life Member of the Melbourne Football Club

== Coaching career ==
=== Melbourne Football Club ===
In 1991, Connolly was appointed as assistant coach at the Melbourne Football Club under senior coach John Northey.

=== Other coaching roles ===
He then went on to become the coach of the Under 18 Eastern Ranges team in 1992. In 1995, Connolly coached the Victoria Metro team.

=== Hawthorn Football Club ===
In late 1995, Connolly joined the Hawthorn Football Club as reserves coach for the 1996 season. In 1998, he was elevated to the senior assistant coaching role. In the 2001 season, Connolly coached Hawthorn as interim senior coach for one game in Round 17, 2001 against Carlton, in the absence of regular senior coach Peter Schwab due to illness, when Schwab was first diagnosed with a benign arrhythmia of the heart. Hawthorn won this game, with Ben Dixon kicking the winning goal after the siren.

=== Fremantle Football Club ===
Connolly took over the coaching role at the Dockers for the 2002 season, when he became the senior coach of Fremantle Football Club after their wooden spoon season of 2001. Connolly replaced Fremantle Football Club caretaker senior coach Ben Allan, who replaced Damian Drum, after Drum was sacked during the middle of the 2001 season. In his first season as senior coach, the struggle continued somewhat, with the team finishing thirteenth at the end of the 2002 season. However, Connolly then led Fremantle to its inaugural finals series in the 2003 season, which resulted in a loss to Essendon at Subiaco Oval in the first elimination final.

In the following seasons, Connolly was criticised for not building on that initial finals appearance, with the Dockers finishing ninth in the 2004 season and therefore just missed out of the finals, and finished in tenth position in the 2005 season, despite a late season surge.

Before the 2006 season, Connolly made only three changes to the playing list, trusting the young list that had been developed during his tenure. Despite an indifferent start, and with intense scrutiny on Connolly's coaching, Fremantle stormed home, winning a club record nine games in a row and finishing third at the end of the 2006 season.

In Round 5, 2006, Connolly was involved in the 2006 AFL siren controversy, where he ran onto the ground believing play had finished and was involved in a heated discussion with St Kilda football player Lenny Hayes.

The 2006 finals series then saw the Dockers lose to Adelaide (away), before Connolly led them to the club's first ever finals win, against Melbourne at Subiaco Oval. Unfortunately, the Dockers' run ended the following week, with a preliminary final loss to Sydney.

In the 2007 season, Connolly's coaching future at Fremantle was constantly under scrutiny, as despite starting the season as one of the premiership favourites, the team performed poorly, sitting at thirteenth position on the ladder with six wins and nine losses. Fremantle president Rick Hart publicly stated that making finals would be a major factor in Connolly retaining the senior coaching post.

On 18 July 2007, three days after Fremantle lost by four points to the Kangaroos at Subiaco Oval in Round 15, 2007, Connolly announced that he would resign as Fremantle Football Club senior coach immediately. Connolly was given the chance to coach for two more games, but declined the offer. He departed the Dockers with a 52% coaching success rate. He was replaced by assistant coach Mark Harvey as caretaker senior coach of Fremantle Football Club for the rest of the 2007 season, and who was eventually employed full-time senior coach.

=== Coaching/Administration Career Timeline ===
- 1991 – assistant coach at the Melbourne Football Club
- 1992–1995 – inaugural coach of Under 18 Eastern Ranges side. AFL senior players produced: David Wirrpunda, Chris Scott, Brad Scott, Rayden Tallis, Kane Johnson, Adam Kingsley, Jess Sinclair, Mark Bolton.
- 1996–1997 – Hawthorn reserves coach. AFL senior players produced: Ben Dixon, Angelo Lekkas, Luke McCabe, Jade Rawlings, Jonathan Hay, Rayden Tallis, Brad Scott.
- 1998–2001 – Hawthorn senior assistant coach.
  - Round 17, 2001 – senior coach vs Carlton (MCG)
- 2002–2007 – Fremantle Football Club. Appointed as senior coach to help rebuild Fremantle both on and off the field.
  - 2002 – took over the coaching reins following Fremantle's 2001 wooden spoon season and the declaration that the club had a $8 million debt. Won nine games but struggled to win away from Perth. Finished thirteenth.
  - 2003 – new travelling routine had Fremantle finally winning away from home. Won fourteen games, playing – and unfortunately losing – first ever final, against Essendon at Subiaco.
  - 2004 – Fremantle won 11 games, finished ninth.
  - 2005 – Fremantle won 11 games, finished tenth.
  - 2006 – Fremantle won 15 games, finished third and participated in finals, before losing the preliminary final. Then awarded the Con Regan medal, which recognises those who 'have made an extraordinary, inspirational and personal contribution' to the Fremantle Football Club.
- 2008 – Connolly is appointed General Manager – Football by the Melbourne Football Club, and in 2012 becomes the MFC's General Manager – Club Development.

== Post-coaching career ==
=== Melbourne Football Club Football manager (2007–2013) ===
In 2007, Connolly was shortlisted for the senior coaching role at Melbourne. However, he was unsuccessful, with the position going to Dean Bailey, while Connolly was appointed to the role of football manager at Melbourne Football Club.

In 2013, an investigation into Melbourne's 2009 season found Connolly and former senior coach Dean Bailey guilty of discussions not in the best interests of the AFL. The charges related most specifically to a meeting in July 2009. This occasion became known colloquially as 'the vault' meeting, in which Connolly allegedly openly discussed the potential benefits to the club of tanking.

As a result of the AFL's investigation, Connolly was banned from serving in any position at Melbourne until February 2014. However, following the resignation of both the CEO and president, Connolly was sacked by the Melbourne Football Club in October 2013.

=== 2014 onwards – Media ===
Connolly continues his involvement in the AFL arena, writing for the AFL Record and AFL website. He has also provided special comments on ABC Radio and AFL Live, as well as working with Croc Media on the Footy WA television show.

- 2008–2017 – ABC Radio special comments commentator
- 2008–2017 – Croc Media television and radio commentator
- 2014 – AFL Media website and AFL Record writer

In 2018, Connolly was made a Life Member of the Shepparton United Football Club, recognising his ongoing support for and dedication to the club since first playing there in 1978.

=== Advanced High Performance (AHP) 2014– ===
In 2014, Connolly also became a founding partner of Advanced High Performance (advancedhp.com.au) with Mark Campbell, Martin Sperring and Wayne Oswald, specialising in designing software and support programs for community clubs, administrators, coaches and players.

==== Advanced Coach Mentoring (ACM) ====
In conjunction with educationist and successful community club coach Peter Nicholson, AHP has designed a coach mentoring program to educate, develop and support community clubs and their coaches.

==== Advanced Kick Coaching (AKC) ====
In conjunction with kicking expert, Dr Kevin Ball, AHP has designed a kicking analysis method and home coaching program in order to educate young footballers regarding how to improve their kicking.

=== CLUBMAP 2015 ===
Connolly, AHP partners and sports administration expert Terry Dillon designed a range of tools to analyse, educate, direct and support sport governing bodies and community clubs. CLUBMAP (clubmap.com.au) is joining major community groups and commercial partners to work with organisations from 65 sports; 7500+ volunteer administrators from 3000+ clubs across Australia and internationally.

== Teaching career ==
Connolly – who has a Bachelor of Education, majoring in physical education and science – taught at Northcote Technical School, and at Pembroke Secondary College in the outer eastern suburbs of Melbourne. He taught classes in physical education, health studies and specialist sporting activities.
