= Leigh Harding =

Australian rules footballer

Personal information
- Born: 26 April 1981 (age 45)
- Original team: Bannockburn / Geelong U18
- Debut: Round 17, 28 July 2001, Kangaroos vs. Brisbane Lions, at Colonial Stadium
- Height: 181 cm (5 ft 11 in)
- Weight: 84 kg (185 lb)

Playing career^{1}
Years	Club	Games (Goals)
2001–2010	North Melbourne	141 (157)

Coaching career^{3}
Years	Club	Games (W–L–D)
2013–2014	Brisbane Lions (NEAFL)	39 (25–14–0)
- ^{1} Playing statistics correct to the end of 2010.^{3} Coaching statistics correct as of 2014.

Career highlights
- Kangaroos leading goalkicker 2003

Leigh Harding (born 26 April 1981) is a former Australian rules footballer in the Australian Football League. He currently serves as an Offensive Skills coach at the Brisbane Lions, and also as an assistant coach of the Lions' NEAFL reserves team.

Originally from Teesdale, Victoria, a small town near Bannockburn, Victoria Harding then played under-18 football with the Geelong Falcons before he moved to play with Geelong in the VFL.

Selected in the 2000 rookie draft, he was elevated from the Kangaroos' rookie list in 2001, where he made his debut as a 20-year-old.

A crumbing forward, Harding had the tendency to miss simple shots at goal on the run, although he had a high work rate. He topped the Kangaroos goalkicking in 2003 with just 33 goals, an equal personal best season haul.

In 2005, Harding moved from being a fringe player to more of a regular role. This improved in 2006 when he played 19 games out of 21 until the final training session before Round 22, the final week of the season. Bad luck struck when he suffered a serious knee injury, requiring a knee reconstruction, keeping him out of playing for around 12 months.

Leigh Harding retired from football in 2010.
