= Aaron Davey =

Australian rules footballer (born 1983)

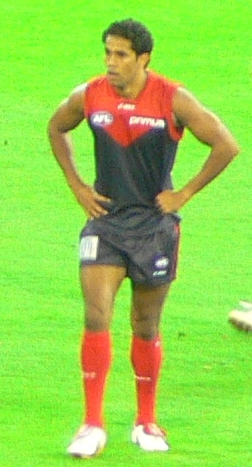
- Davey in March 2007

Personal information
- Full name: Aaron Davey
- Born: 10 June 1983 (age 43); Darwin, Northern Territory
- Original team: Port Melbourne (VFL)
- Draft: No. 3, 2004 Rookie Draft, Melbourne
- Height: 177 cm (5 ft 10 in)
- Weight: 74 kg (163 lb)
- Position: Midfielder

Playing career^{1}
| Years | Club | Games (Goals) |
| 2004–2013 | Melbourne | 178 (174) |

Representative team honours^{2}
| Years | Team | Games (Goals) |
| 2005–2009 | Indigenous All-Stars | 3 |

International team honours^{2}
| 2005–2006 | Australia | 4 |
- ^{1} Playing statistics correct to the end of 2013.^{2} Representative statistics correct as of 2006.

Career highlights
- Keith 'Bluey' Truscott Medal 2009; Harold Ball Memorial Trophy: 2004; AFL Rising Star nominee: 2004; Fothergill–Round–Mitchell Medal: 2003

Aaron Davey (born 10 June 1983) is a former professional Australian rules footballer, who represented the Melbourne Football Club between 2004 and 2013.

Davey was a runner-up in the AFL Rising Star award in 2004 and represented Australia in the International Rules Series against Ireland in 2005 and 2006.

== Early years ==
Davey, who is of Indigenous Australian ancestry with roots in the Kokatha people of South Australia, was raised in Darwin, Northern Territory. He is one of five siblings, including his brother Alwyn, who played for Essendon.

Davey began playing football in the Northern Territory Football League for the Palmerston Football Club. He later moved to Melbourne to pursue an AFL career and trialed with the Port Melbourne Football Club in the Victorian Football League.

In 2003, Davey was selected by the Melbourne Football Club with Pick No. 3 in the rookie draft. He began his AFL career in 2004.

== AFL career ==
=== Debut Season: 2004 ===
Davey made his AFL debut for Melbourne in the 2004 season. In his first match, he scored a goal and 13 possessions. He earned an AFL Rising Star nomination, but a hamstring injury sidelined him for four games before returning for the finals.

At the end of the season, he won the AFLPA best first year player.

=== Season 2005 ===
In 2005, Davey played 22 games and represented Australia in the International Rules Series. He finished third in Melbourne's Best and Fairest award and won the AFLPA Marn Grook Award for Best Emerging Indigenous Player.

=== Season 2006 ===
Davey played across multiple positions, including forward, midfield, and backline. He earned three Goal of the Year nominations, including two consecutive, soccer-style goals.

=== Seasons 2007-2010 ===
In 2007, Davey was suspended for two games for striking. He was injured in 2008, and then moved into the midfield under new coach Dean Bailey in 2009. In 2009 he won Melbourne's Best and Fairest award, the Keith 'Bluey' Truscott Medal. In 2010, Davey finished fourth in Melbourne's Best and Fairest and was Melbourne's equal leading vote-getter at the Brownlow Medal.

=== Retirement ===
Davey announced his retirement on 20 August 2013 and played his final AFL game on 1 September 2013 against the Western Bulldogs.

== Statistics ==
Legend
| G | Goals | K | Kicks | D | Disposals | T | Tackles |
| B | Behinds | H | Handballs | M | Marks |

| Season | Team | No. | Games | Totals | | | | | | | Averages (per game) | | | | | | | Votes |
| Season | Team | No. | Games | G | B | K | H | D | M | T | G | B | K | H | D | M | T | Votes |
|---|---|---|---|---|---|---|---|---|---|---|---|---|---|---|---|---|---|---|
| 2004 | Melbourne | 36 | 19 | 28 | 20 | 131 | 50 | 181 | 21 | 50 | 1.5 | 1.1 | 6.9 | 2.6 | 9.5 | 1.1 | 2.6 | 0 |
| 2005 | Melbourne | 36 | 23 | 30 | 32 | 198 | 81 | 279 | 49 | 71 | 1.3 | 1.4 | 8.6 | 3.5 | 12.1 | 2.1 | 3.1 | 0 |
| 2006 | Melbourne | 36 | 22 | 37 | 15 | 253 | 74 | 327 | 79 | 63 | 1.7 | 0.7 | 11.5 | 3.4 | 14.9 | 3.6 | 2.9 | 2 |
| 2007 | Melbourne | 36 | 18 | 24 | 13 | 200 | 58 | 258 | 57 | 70 | 1.3 | 0.7 | 11.1 | 3.2 | 14.3 | 3.2 | 3.9 | 2 |
| 2008 | Melbourne | 36 | 15 | 11 | 10 | 164 | 73 | 237 | 48 | 44 | 0.7 | 0.7 | 10.9 | 4.9 | 15.8 | 3.2 | 2.9 | 0 |
| 2009 | Melbourne | 36 | 22 | 9 | 8 | 357 | 147 | 504 | 60 | 90 | 0.4 | 0.4 | 16.2 | 6.7 | 22.9 | 2.7 | 4.1 | 6 |
| 2010 | Melbourne | 36 | 20 | 8 | 9 | 289 | 98 | 387 | 45 | 75 | 0.4 | 0.5 | 14.5 | 4.9 | 19.4 | 2.3 | 3.8 | 10 |
| 2011 | Melbourne | 36 | 11 | 5 | 7 | 127 | 50 | 177 | 29 | 31 | 0.5 | 0.6 | 11.5 | 4.5 | 16.1 | 2.6 | 2.8 | 0 |
| 2012 | Melbourne | 36 | 8 | 7 | 3 | 51 | 33 | 84 | 13 | 37 | 0.9 | 0.4 | 6.4 | 4.1 | 10.5 | 1.6 | 4.6 | 0 |
| 2013 | Melbourne | 36 | 20 | 15 | 12 | 162 | 53 | 215 | 39 | 42 | 0.8 | 0.6 | 8.1 | 2.7 | 10.8 | 2.0 | 2.1 | 2 |
| Career | | | 178 | 174 | 129 | 1932 | 717 | 2649 | 440 | 573 | 1.0 | 0.7 | 10.9 | 4.0 | 14.9 | 2.5 | 3.2 | 22 |

== Honours and achievements ==
- Individual
  - Keith 'Bluey' Truscott Medal: 2009
  - AFL Rising Star Runner-up: 2004
  - AFL Rising Star Nominee: 2004 (Round 1)
  - Australian Representative Honours in International Rules Football: 2005, 2006, 2013
  - Harold Ball Memorial Trophy: 2004
  - AFLPA Marn Grook Award: 2005
  - Indigenous All-Stars Representative Honours: 2007, 2009, 2013

== Media appearances ==
Davey made an appearance on the AFL Players Revue of the Grand Final edition of The AFL Footy Show doing a Michael Jackson impersonation.

Davey is a frequent panelist on The Marngrook Footy Show.

== Personal life and family ==
Davey is the older brother of Alwyn Davey, who played for Essendon, and is related to Brownlow Medallist, Gavin Wanganeen, and NBA player Patrick Mills.

His sister, Bronwyn, was part of the first AFL Women's Draft, playing for the Melbourne Football Club's women's team recruited from Greenacres, South Australia.

== Charitable work ==
In 2005, Davey became an ambassador for The Fred Hollows Foundation. In 2013, he participated in Coastrek, running 50km to raise funds for the foundation and to raise awareness about the health issues affecting Aboriginals and Torres Strait Islander communities.
