= Dean Bailey =

Australian rules footballer and coach (1967–2014)

- Bailey as Melbourne coach

Personal information
- Full name: Dean Bailey
- Nickname: Bails
- Born: 18 January 1967
- Died: 11 March 2014 (aged 47)
- Original team: North Ringwood (EFL)
- Height: 179 cm (5 ft 10 in)
- Weight: 78 kg (172 lb)
- Position: Utility

Playing career^{1}
Years	Club	Games (Goals)
1986–1992	Essendon	53 (19)

Coaching career^{3}
Years	Club	Games (W–L–D)
2008–2011	Melbourne	83 (22–59–2)
- ^{1} Playing statistics correct to the end of 1992.^{3} Coaching statistics correct as of 2011.

Dean Bailey (18 January 1967 – 11 March 2014) was an Australian rules football player and coach. He played for the Essendon Football Club and was the senior coach of the Melbourne Football Club, as well as an assistant coach at Essendon and Port Adelaide and the Strategy & Innovation Coach at the Adelaide Football Club (Adelaide Crows). Bailey died of lung cancer on 11 March 2014.

== Playing career ==
=== Essendon ===
Bailey played 53 games for Essendon, mainly as a centreman from 1986 until 1992 and kicked 19 goals. He wore guernsey numbers 42 and 31, and preceded Dustin Fletcher in wearing the latter number.

== Coaching career ==
Bailey became senior coach of Mount Gravatt Football Club in Queensland at the end of the 1997 season. In 1998, In his first season as senior coach, he guided Mt Gravatt to fourth place. In 1999, he coached Mt Gravatt to third position in his second and final year.

=== Essendon Football Club assistant coach ===
At the end of the 1999 season, Bailey became an assistant coach in the position of development coach at the Essendon Football Club under senior coach Kevin Sheedy and helped the club to their 2000 premiership. In his second year back with the Dons, they again made the 2001 Grand Final, except this time they lost to the Brisbane Lions by 26 points. Bailey left the Essendon Football Club at the end of the 2001 season.

=== Port Adelaide Football Club assistant coach ===
Bailey joined the Port Adelaide Football Club in 2002 as an assistant coach under senior coach Mark Williams, a position he held in guiding the club to the 2004 premiership, its first one in the AFL. After Port Adelaide lost the 2007 Grand Final, Bailey left the Port Adelaide Football Club at the end of the 2007 season.

=== Melbourne Football Club senior coach ===
At the end of the 2007 season, he was appointed as the senior coach of the Melbourne Football Club for the 2008 season. Bailey replaced Melbourne Football Club caretaker senior coach Mark Riley, who replaced Neale Daniher, after Daniher resigned in the middle of the 2007 season.

The 2008 season started badly for Bailey, with the Demons losing their first six games by lopsided margins before winning its first match of the season against Fremantle in round seven. Things did not get better, as the Demons under Bailey lost the next six games; however, they won their second game in Round 14 against Brisbane. Then they lost the next five games and won their third game in Round 20 against West Coast. Melbourne under Bailey finished 16th in the last position on the ladder at the end of the 2008 season, claiming the wooden spoon with three wins and 19 losses.

The 2009 season started with three losses for the Demons under Bailey, before an inspiring and unexpected win by eight points against Richmond in their round four clash at the MCG. At the mid-way point of the 2009 season, the Demons under Bailey sat last on the ladder with one win and eleven losses, but Bailey retained his commitment to youth and gave many youngsters on Melbourne's list valuable experience over the first half of the year. The club under Bailey, finished the 2009 season with four wins and 18 losses and finished last on the ladder for the wooden spoon again in the second consecutive year running.

The 2010 season for the Demons under Bailey began with a first round-loss to Hawthorn by 56 points in which the playing group and Bailey were criticised in the media for their on-field performance. But the Demons bounced back in their second game of the season, losing to eventual premier Collingwood by just one point. Round three saw the Demons chalk up their first victory of the season, a 16-point victory over the Adelaide Crows. This was followed by big victories over Richmond and the Brisbane Lions, the latter considered to be a major upset at that point of 2010, as the Lions were undefeated at the time, and fielded big-name players including Brown and Fevola. Despite elevated expectations the Demons then went on to lose their next three games. A narrow victory over Port Adelaide in round 9 however gave fans something to celebrate. Again the club suffered several more losses following the win, as well as a nail-biting draw to Collingwood, in the annual Queen's Birthday match. The club found some form again in the following weeks, beating Essendon in round 15, narrowly losing to Fremantle in round 16 (after a huge comeback) and winning again in round 17, thrashing 2005 premiers Sydney by 73 points. A 10-point win over struggling Brisbane at the Gabba and then Richmond at the MCG followed. Ultimately, the Demons under Bailey finished 12th on the ladder at season's end, a somewhat huge improvement from the past two seasons.

The 2011 season saw the Demons, under Bailey, experience great fluctuations in form. Starting the season with a draw against Sydney, the team was well beaten by Hawthorn in the second round despite leading at half time. Consecutive victories followed, with a narrow win over the Brisbane Lions, and league newcomers Gold Coast by 90 points. Following a bye, the club suffered a 54-point defeat at the hands of West Coast before bouncing back the following week, thrashing Adelaide by 96 points, recording their biggest-ever victory against them. It was also their biggest win under Dean Bailey to date. Three losses followed, followed by a surprise victory over Essendon. The traditional Queen's Birthday clash, which had been drawn the previous year, turned into a blow-out with Collingwood winning by 88 points, the biggest margin in a Queen's Birthday clash to date. The Demons then went on to record another massive turnaround, recording their biggest-ever victory over Fremantle, by 89 points, the following week. This was followed up with a victory over Richmond. The next week saw Melbourne face the Western Bulldogs at Etihad Stadium. It was a disappointing week for the Demons, as they lost by 64 points. Melbourne had the bye the following week, followed by yet another turnaround followed in a win over Port Adelaide in Darwin, before losing to Hawthorn by 54 points the following round.

In Round 19, 2011, Melbourne under Bailey suffered a humiliating 186-point defeat against Geelong at Skilled Stadium, the defeat marking the second-greatest losing margin in VFL/AFL history. The day after the match, the Melbourne Football Club held a board meeting, where it was announced by the club president, Jim Stynes, that Bailey was sacked as Melbourne Football Club senior coach. He left the club with only 22 wins from 83 matches, a winning percentage of just over 25%. Bailey was replaced by assistant coach Todd Viney as caretaker senior coach for the remainder of the 2011 season.

Bailey then made statements, interpreted by some as an admission of tanking, at the press conference which followed his sacking as Melbourne Football Club senior coach in August 2011. Bailey was quoted as saying:

"I had no hesitation at all in the first two years of ensuring this club was well placed for draft picks. I think what we've done is the right thing by the club, and if it cost me my job, so be it. But the club is always bigger than the individual. I was asked to do the best thing by the Melbourne Football Club and I did it. I did the right thing by the Melbourne Football Club. I put players in different positions to enable them [to develop] … I think the whole football club agreed we wanted to develop our players so we did".

Eighteen months after his sacking as Melbourne Football Club senior coach, a Melbourne Football Club tanking scandal investigation into the Melbourne Football club's 2009 season found Bailey and then football manager Chris Connolly guilty of "acting in a manner prejudicial to the interests of the competition". This related most specifically to a meeting in July 2009, which became known colloquially as "the vault", in which Connolly allegedly openly discussed the potential benefits to the club of tanking. Bailey, then an assistant coach at the Adelaide Crows, was banned from coaching for the first sixteen rounds of the 2013 season, meaning he could not engage with any players during his suspension.

=== Adelaide Football Club assistant coach ===
On 4 October 2011, Bailey was appointed to the Adelaide Football Club as an assistant coach in a new role as a strategy and innovation coach.

In a statement released by Adelaide on 27 November 2013, it was revealed that Bailey was suffering from cancer and was on indefinite leave. He never returned to work, though he did visit the club in late 2013 and early 2014 during pre-season training before his untimely death in March.

== Personal life ==
Bailey was married to Caron and had two sons.

== Death and legacy ==
Bailey died of lung cancer on 11 March 2014.

Melbourne captain Max Gawn paid tribute to Bailey (under whom he made his AFL debut in 2011), among other deceased club identities, in a post-match interview upon the club winning the 2021 AFL Grand Final.
