= List of AFL debuts in 2008 =

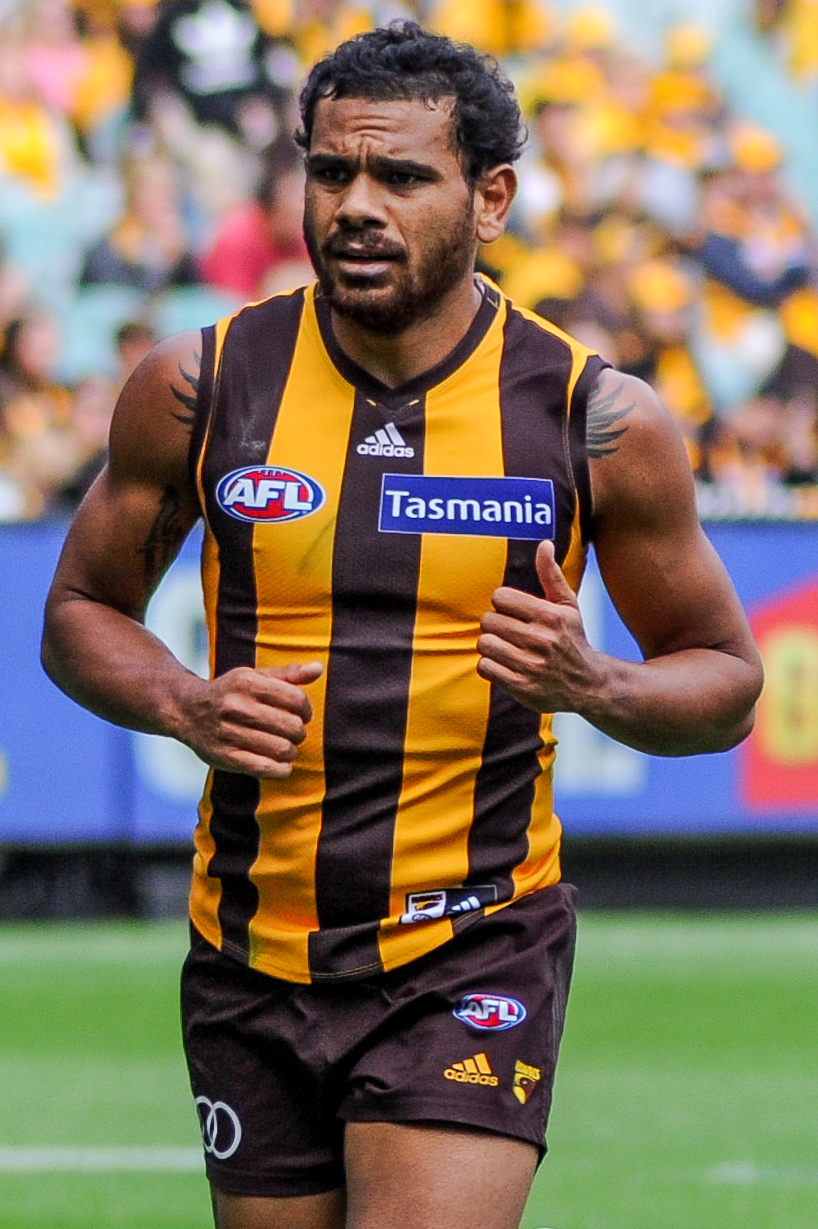
Cyril Rioli played every game for Hawthorn in his first season, including the AFL Grand Final.

The 2008 season was the 112th completed season of the Australian Football League (AFL), the highest-level Australian rules football competition in Australia. There were 84 players who first participated in an AFL premiership match during the 2008 season. The regular season commenced on 20 March and concluded with the AFL Grand Final on 27 September, where the premiership was won by Hawthorn. This year celebrated the 150th anniversary of the establishment of Australian football as a sport in 1858.

The premiership season is inclusive of home-and-away and finals series matches only, and does not include pre-season matches or representative games (such as State of Origin or International rules football). Of those making their AFL debut, there were 17 rookie-listed players who were elevated to their clubs' senior list during the season. Rookie players receive a reduced salary in comparison to senior-listed players, and are not necessarily automatically eligible for selection in games, unless they are elevated.

In addition to those players making their debuts, there were 25 players who played their first game with a new AFL club after previously having played with another club in the league. Notably, former West Coast captain Chris Judd played his first game for Carlton in the first round of the season, after being traded in the preceding off-season. Cyril Rioli played every game for Hawthorn in the 2008 season, playing a total of 25 games (including the Grand Final)—the most of any debut player that year. Jack Anthony scored the most goals out of first-year players in 2008, attaining 25 goals in his 12 matches.

== Summary ==
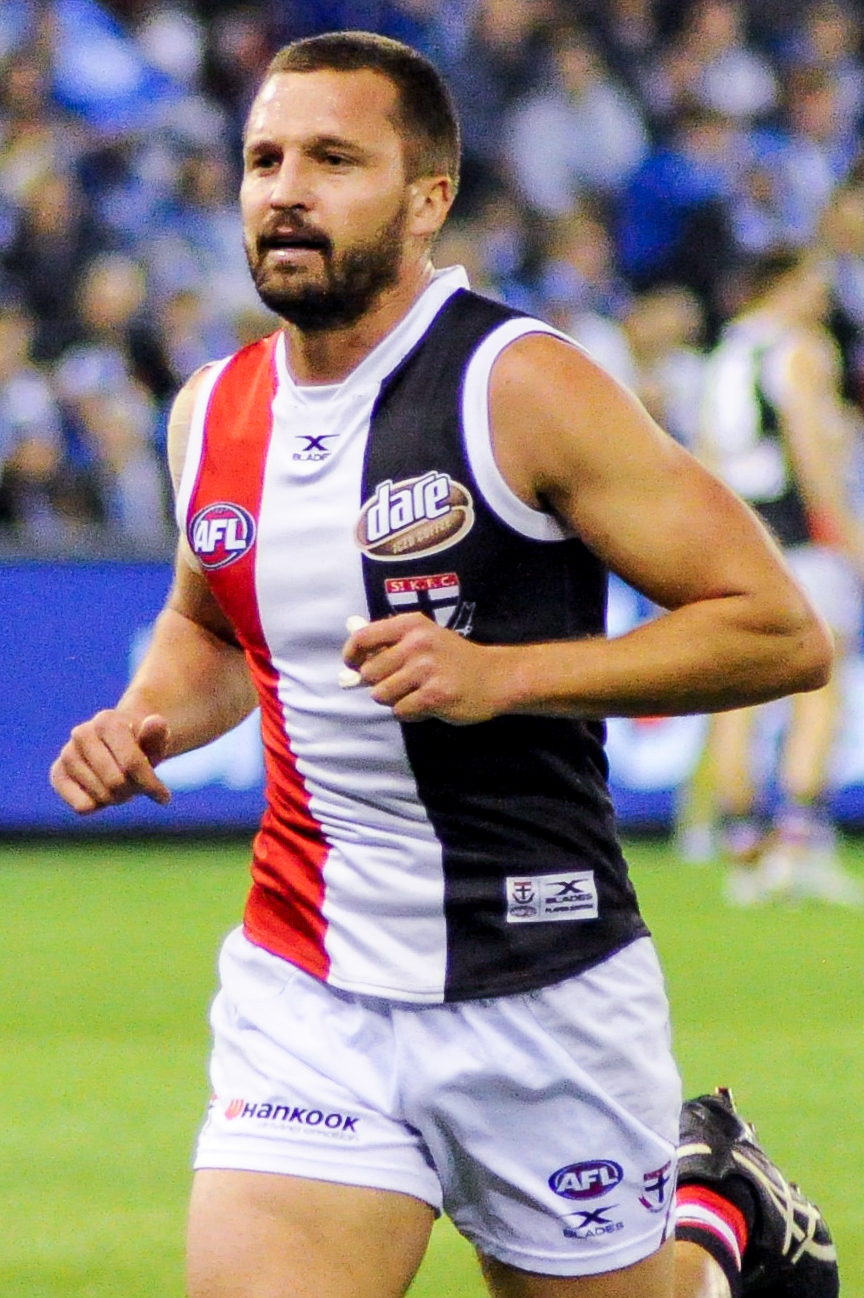
Jarryn Geary played ten games in 2008.

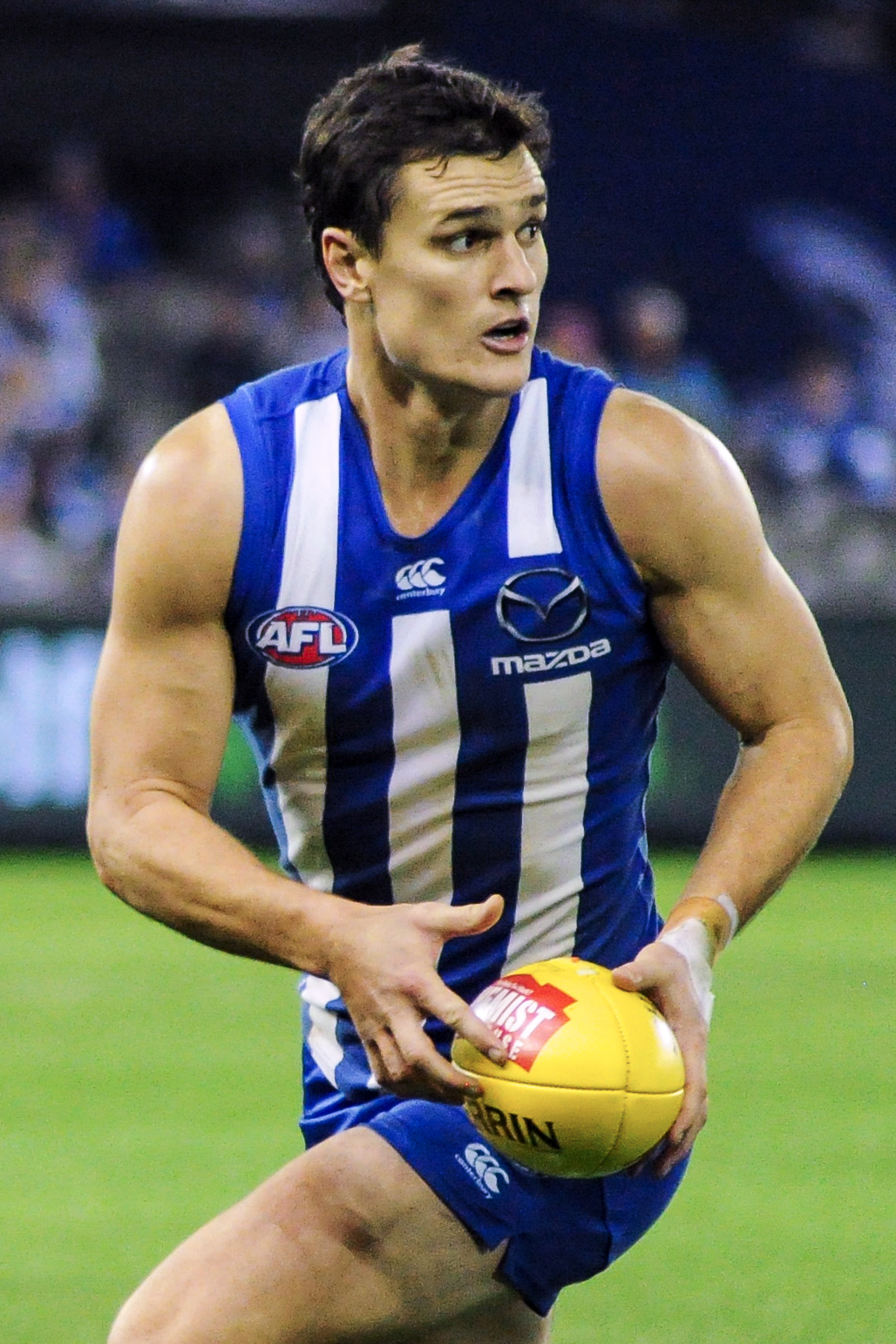
Scott Thompson played his first game in the opening round of the season.

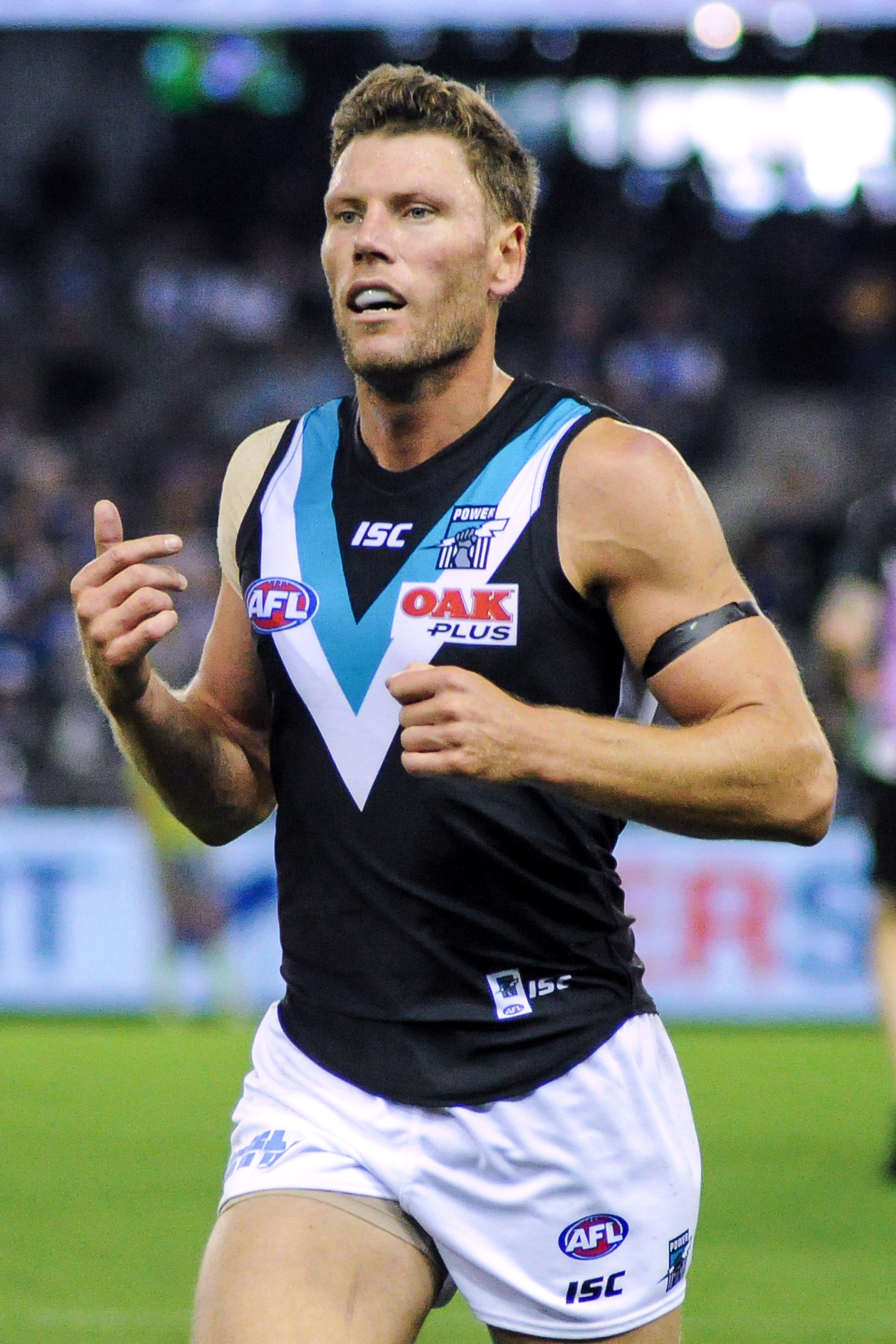
Brad Ebert played 15 games in his first season.

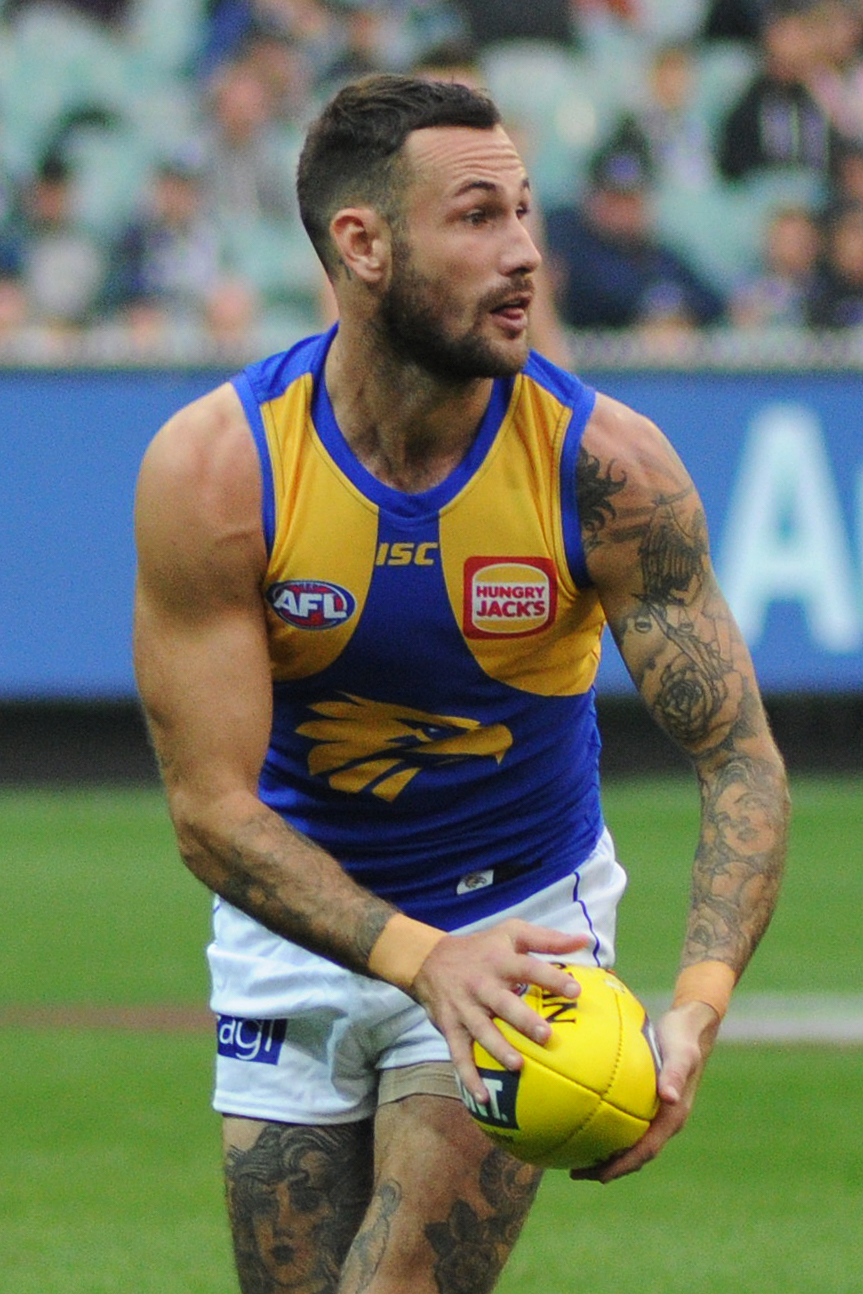
Chris Masten played nine games in his first season.

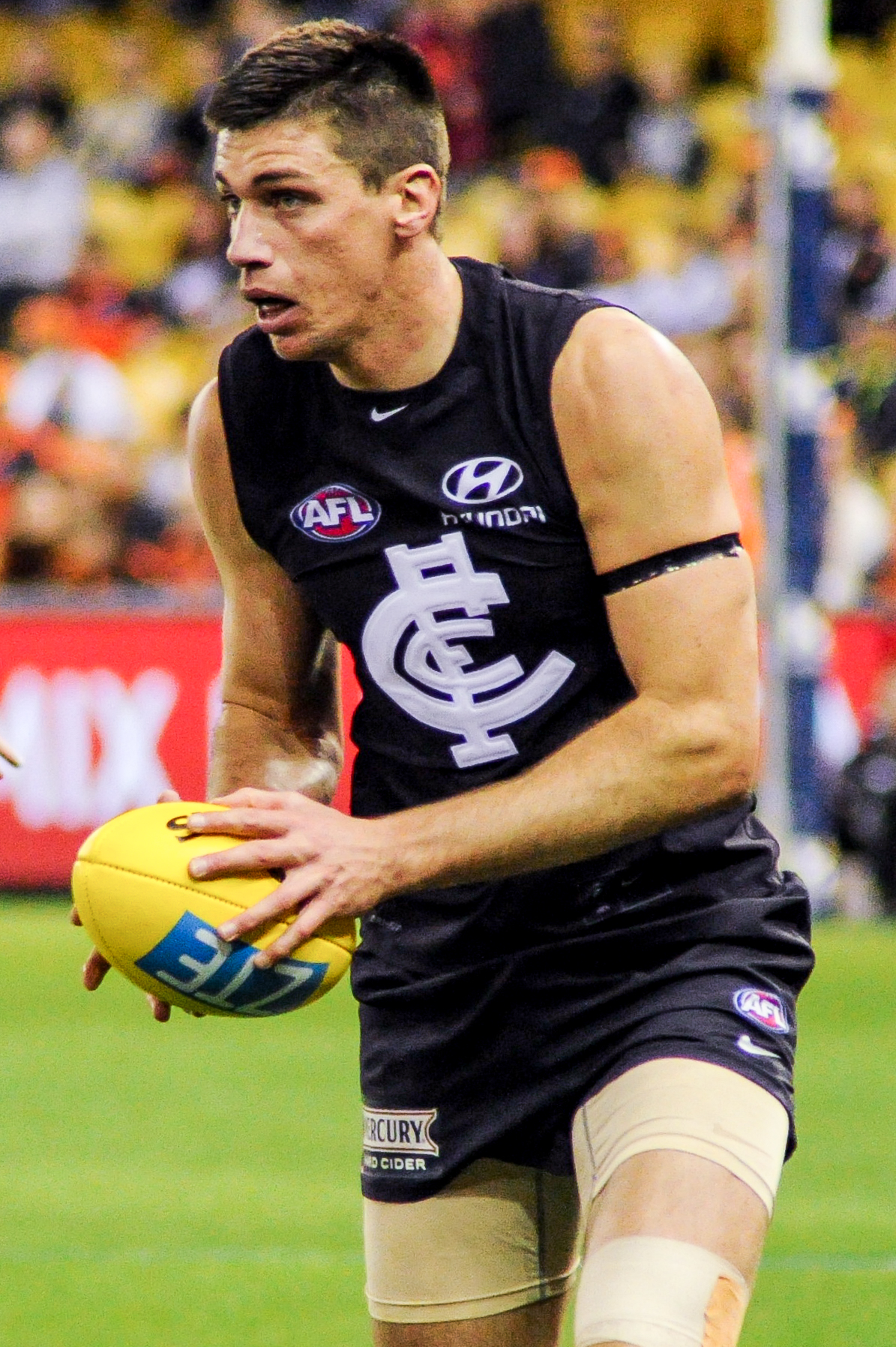
Matthew Kreuzer played 20 games this season after being selected with the number-one overall selection in the 2007 national draft by Carlton.

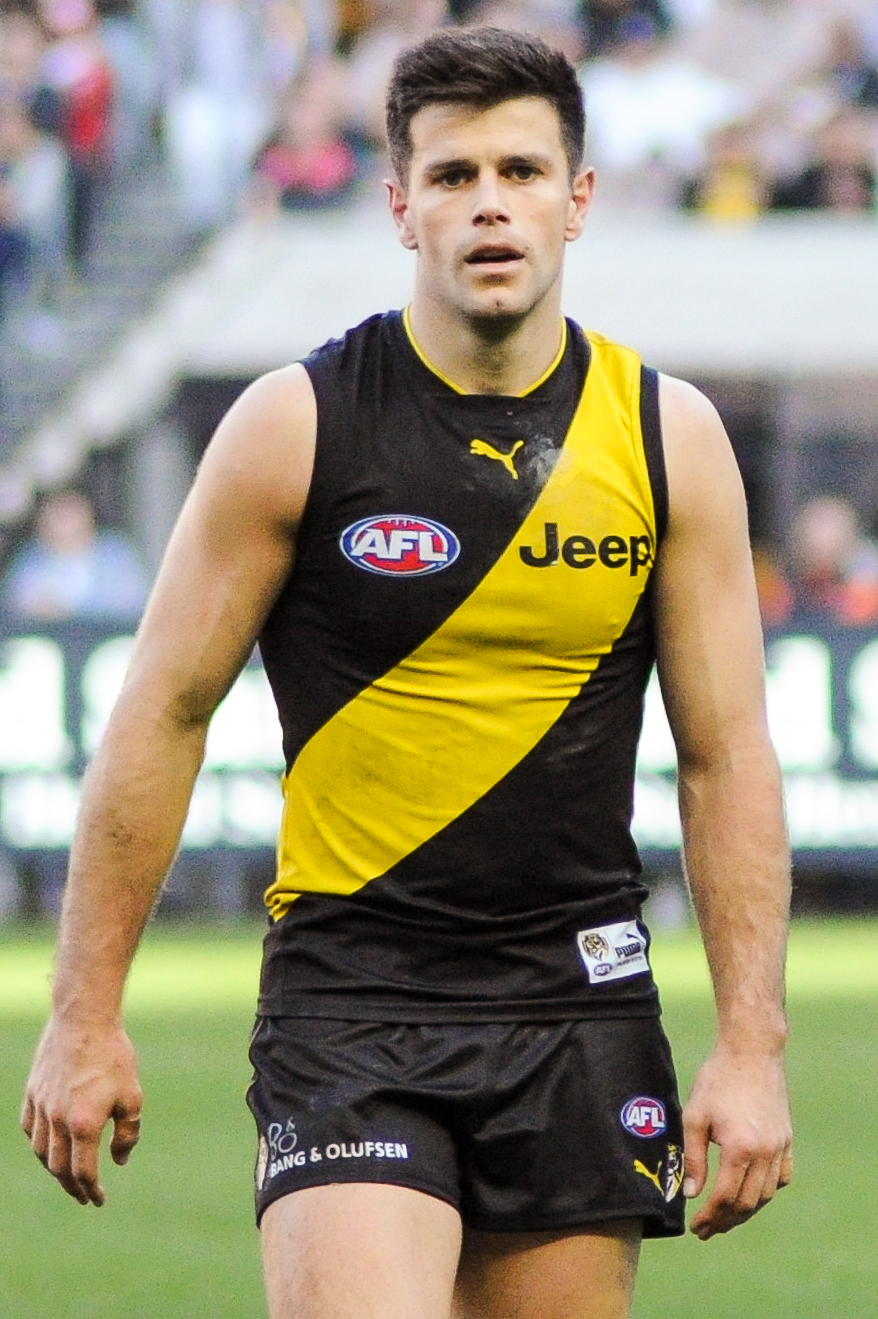
Trent Cotchin played in Richmond's final 15 matches for the season after his debut in round eight.

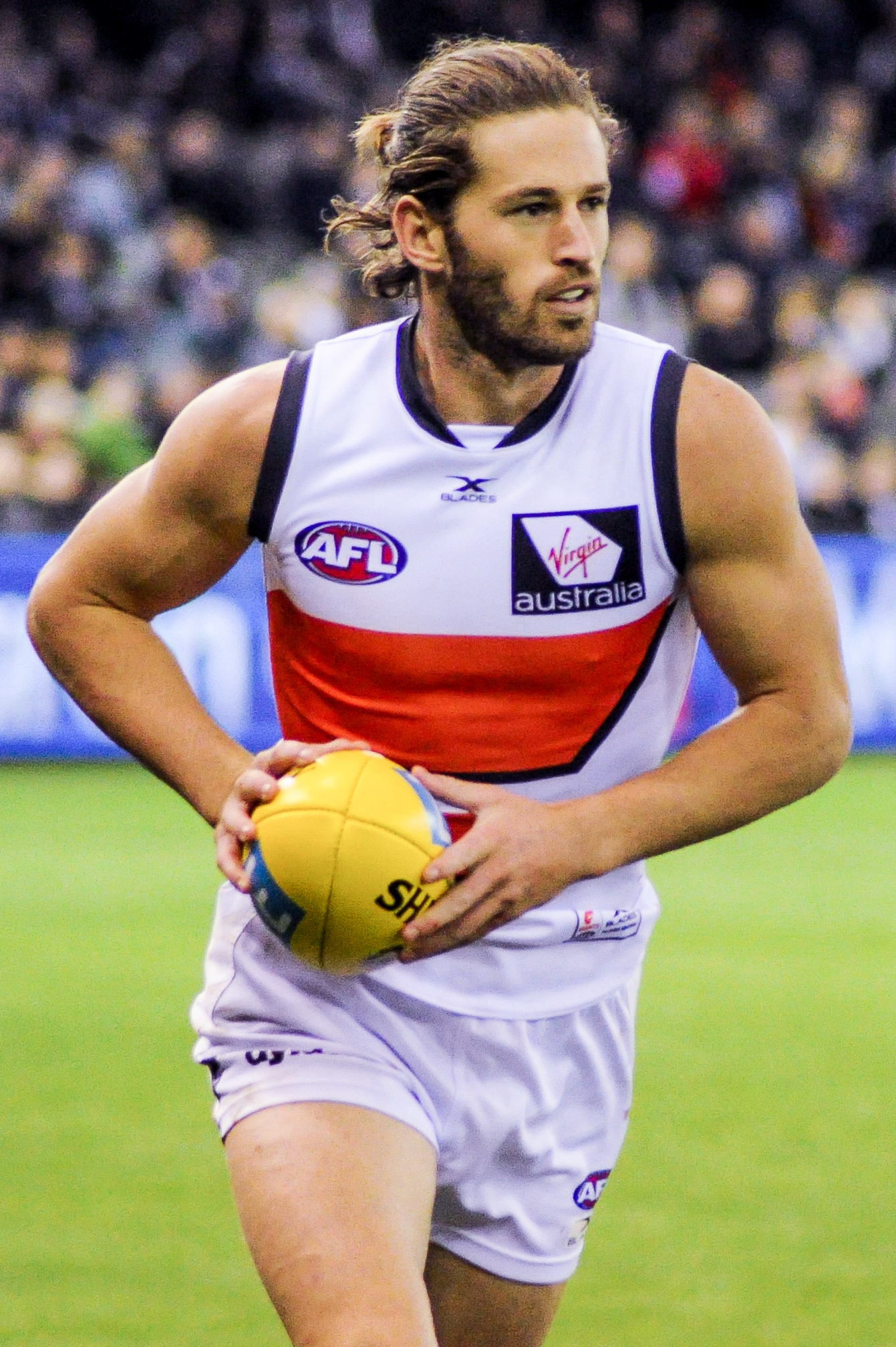
Callan Ward played six games in his first season.

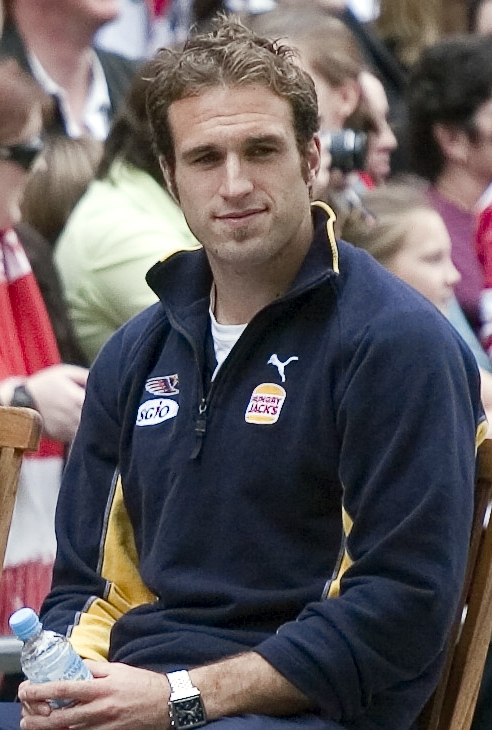
Former West Coast captain Chris Judd returned to his home state of Victoria to captain Carlton.

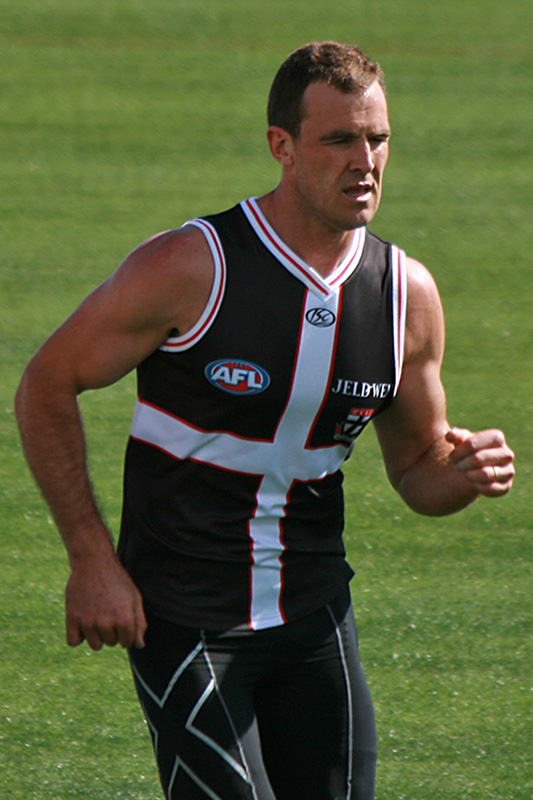
Steven King played 22 games for St Kilda in 2008, having previously played for Geelong.

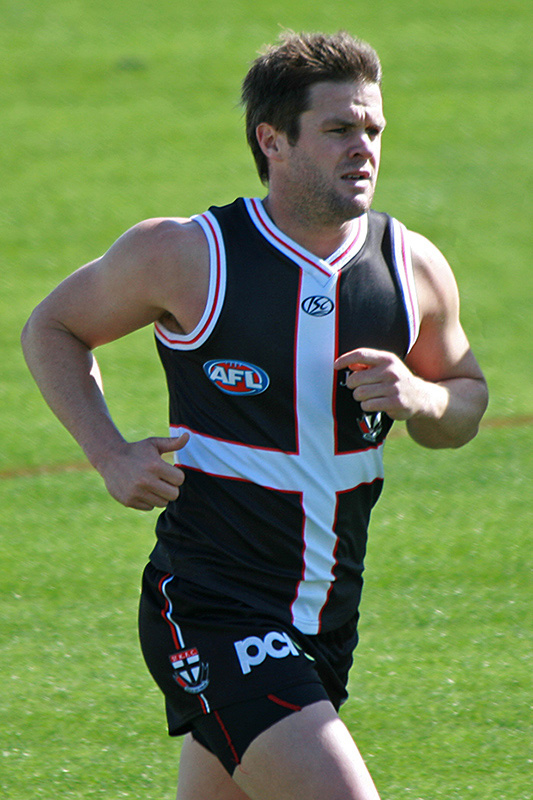
Adam Schneider formerly played for Sydney before joining St Kilda prior to the 2008 season.

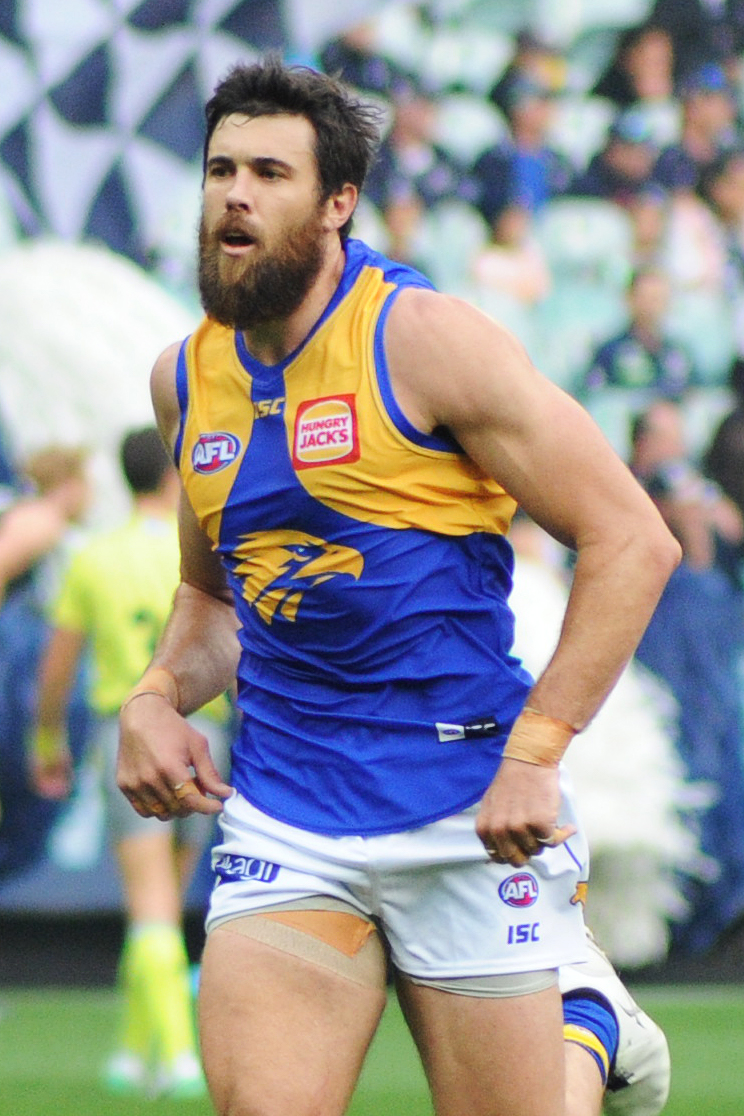
Josh Kennedy played seven games in his first season for West Coast.

Summary of debuts in 2008
Club	AFL debuts	Change of club
Adelaide	6	2
Brisbane Lions	7	1
Carlton	6	2
Collingwood	5	1
Essendon	8	0
Fremantle	4	2
Geelong	3	0
Hawthorn	5	1
Melbourne	7	0
North Melbourne	6	2
Port Adelaide	6	0
Richmond	1	3
St Kilda	4	5
Sydney	6	2
West Coast	8	1
Western Bulldogs	2	3
Total	84	25

== Debuts ==
Table headers and key
Age	Player's age as of debut
Round	Round when player's first premiership match occurred
Games	The number of games played in 2008
Goals	The number of goals scored in 2008
†	Denotes player who was elevated from club's rookie list

Table of AFL debuts, with appearance details
Rd.	Name	Club	Age	Games	Goals	Ref.
1	Jake Edwards	Carlton	20 years, 74 days	5	4	
1	Paul Stewart	Port Adelaide	20 years, 254 days	11	1	
1	Trent West	Geelong	20 years, 155 days	6	1	
1	Nathan Brown	Collingwood	19 years, 96 days	23	4	
1	Craig Bird	Sydney	19 years, 61 days	21	8	
1	Jarryn Geary	St Kilda	19 years, 273 days	10	0	
1	David Mackay	Adelaide	19 years, 242 days	19	4	
1	Kurt Tippett	Adelaide	20 years, 320 days	19	17	
1	Cale Morton	Melbourne	18 years, 65 days	19	12	
1	Cyril Rioli	Hawthorn	18 years, 253 days	25	24	
1	Cameron Stokes †	Hawthorn	18 years, 265 days	9	6	
1	Isaac Weetra	Melbourne	18 years, 25 days	2	0	
1	Scott Thompson	North Melbourne	21 years, 320 days	6	0	
2	Lachlan Henderson	Brisbane Lions	18 years, 105 days	8	3	
2	Brad Ebert	West Coast	17 years, 362 days	15	5	
2	Chris Masten	West Coast	18 years, 332 days	9	1	
2	Chris Mayne	Fremantle	19 years, 148 days	17	10	
2	Rhys Palmer	Fremantle	19 years, 45 days	20	10	
2	Darren Pfeiffer	Carlton	20 years, 183 days	7	4	
2	Harry Taylor	Geelong	21 years, 292 days	21	3	
3	Scott Selwood	West Coast	18 years, 9 days	9	2	
3	Matthew Kreuzer	Carlton	18 years, 328 days	20	13	
3	Austin Wonaeamirri †	Melbourne	19 years, 187 days	18	24	
3	Jack Anthony	Collingwood	20 years, 78 days	12	25	
4	Tayte Pears	Essendon	18 years, 18 days	5	2	
4	Ben Ross	North Melbourne	19 years, 204 days	3	2	
4	Matthew Spangher	West Coast	20 years, 355 days	7	1	
5	Nick Smith †	Sydney	19 years, 312 days	2	1	
5	Clayton Hinkley	Fremantle	19 years, 58 days	5	2	
5	Jarrhan Jacky	Adelaide	19 years, 14 days	3	1	
6	Sharrod Wellingham †	Collingwood	19 years, 293 days	12	4	
6	Shane Mumford †	Geelong	21 years, 295 days	3	0	
6	Steven Browne	Carlton	19 years, 85 days	13	4	
6	James Polkinghorne	Brisbane Lions	19 years, 97 days	4	0	
6	Jesse White	Sydney	20 years, 109 days	2	0	
7	David Ellard †	Carlton	19 years, 50 days	1	1	
7	James Sellar	Adelaide	19 years, 40 days	1	0	
7	Josh Smith	North Melbourne	22 years, 59 days	2	0	
7	Jarrod Atkinson †	Essendon	23 years, 73 days	5	2	
7	Darcy Daniher	Essendon	18 years, 226 days	3	0	
7	David Myers	Essendon	18 years, 309 days	8	1	
8	Trent Cotchin	Richmond	18 years, 40 days	15	9	
8	Ryan Davis †	West Coast	20 years, 355 days	11	4	
8	Alan Obst †	North Melbourne	20 years, 364 days	3	0	
8	Shane Valenti †	Melbourne	21 years, 110 days	9	3	
9	Tim Houlihan	West Coast	19 years, 104 days	8	0	
9	Beau Wilkes †	West Coast	22 years, 65 days	14	1	
9	Josh Kennedy	Hawthorn	19 years, 340 days	3	0	
9	Jarryd Morton	Hawthorn	19 years, 233 days	8	0	
10	Dennis Armfield	Carlton	21 years, 161 days	9	2	
10	Gavin Urquhart	North Melbourne	20 years, 13 days	14	0	
11	Tom Bellchambers	Essendon	18 years, 334 days	3	0	
11	James Hawksley	Brisbane Lions	19 years, 124 days	4	0	
11	Callan Ward	Western Bulldogs	18 years, 59 days	6	2	
12	Andy Otten	Adelaide	19 years, 30 days	2	0	
12	Brent Renouf	Hawthorn	20 years, 42 days	8	0	
13	Jarryd Allen	St Kilda	20 years, 158 days	4	0	
13	Robert Eddy †	St Kilda	20 years, 165 days	13	3	
13	Ben McEvoy	St Kilda	18 years, 354 days	1	0	
13	Tom Collier	Brisbane Lions	19 years, 88 days	6	1	
14	Stefan Martin	Melbourne	21 years, 225 days	8	0	
14	Josh Head	Fremantle	25 years, 83 days	3	1	
15	Todd Goldstein	North Melbourne	20 years, 11 days	3	2	
16	Bradd Dalziell	Brisbane Lions	21 years, 126 days	7	1	
16	Matthew O'Dwyer †	Sydney	19 years, 365 days	2	1	
17	Addam Maric	Melbourne	18 years, 100 days	5	2	
18	Scott Clouston †	Brisbane Lions	21 years, 182 days	2	1	
18	Ryan Brabazon	Sydney	21 years, 221 days	1	0	
18	Patrick Veszpremi	Sydney	18 years, 337 days	6	9	
18	Mitchell Farmer	Port Adelaide	19 years, 212 days	3	0	
18	Nick Salter †	Port Adelaide	21 years, 4 days	2	3	
19	Ryan Williams	Port Adelaide	19 years, 304 days	2	0	
19	Chris Dawes	Collingwood	20 years, 85 days	6	5	
19	John McCarthy	Collingwood	18 years, 264 days	6	3	
19	Rhys Magin †	Essendon	19 years, 159 days	4	2	
20	Matthew Westhoff	Port Adelaide	20 years, 71 days	3	3	
20	Patrick Dangerfield	Adelaide	18 years, 133 days	2	0	
20	Tony Notte	West Coast	18 years, 123 days	2	0	
21	Cale Hooker	Essendon	19 years, 314 days	2	0	
21	Marlon Motlop	Port Adelaide	18 years, 128 days	2	1	
21	Pearce Hanley †	Brisbane Lions	19 years, 282 days	2	0	
22	Sam Reid	Western Bulldogs	18 years, 297 days	1	0	
22	Jack Grimes	Melbourne	19 years, 112 days	1	0	
22	John Williams	Essendon	19 years, 328 days	1	0	

== Change of clubs ==
Table headers and key
Round	Round when player's first premiership match occurred
Games	The number of games played in 2008
Goals	The number of goals scored in 2008
Previous club(s)	Player's previous AFL clubs, with the yearspan of their appearances
†	Denotes player who was elevated from club's rookie list
Players are only included if they previously played a match with another AFL club.

Table of players, with appearance details
Rd.	Name	Club	Games	Goals	Previous club(s)	Ref.
1	Stuart Dew	Hawthorn	15	7	Port Adelaide (1997–2006)	
1	Charlie Gardiner	St Kilda	12	9	Geelong (2002–2007)	
1	Michael Gardiner	St Kilda	9	1	West Coast (1997–2006)	
1	Richard Hadley	Carlton	6	2	Brisbane Lions (2001–2007)	
1	Ben Hudson	Western Bulldogs	23	2	Adelaide (2004–2007)	
1	Mark Johnson	Fremantle	14	8	Essendon (1999–2007)	
1	Travis Johnstone	Brisbane Lions	18	17	Melbourne (1998–2007)	
1	Chris Judd	Carlton	21	15	West Coast (2002–2007)	
1	Steven King	St Kilda	22	5	Geelong (1996–2007)	
1	Martin Mattner	Sydney	24	4	Adelaide (2002–2007)	
1	Jordan McMahon	Richmond	22	6	Western Bulldogs (2001–2007)	
1	Sam Power	North Melbourne	22	2	Western Bulldogs (2002–2007)	
1	Adam Schneider	St Kilda	19	28	Sydney (2003–2007)	
1	Brad Symes	Adelaide	16	2	Port Adelaide (2004–2007)	
1	Scott Welsh	Western Bulldogs	24	43	North Melbourne (1996–1999); Adelaide (2000–2007)	
1	Cameron Wood	Collingwood	13	6	Brisbane Lions (2005–2007)	
2	Tim Callan	Western Bulldogs	15	1	Geelong (2003–2006)	
3	Mitch Morton	Richmond	17	35	West Coast (2005–2007)	
4	Sean Dempster	St Kilda	19	3	Sydney (2005–2007)	
6	Josh Kennedy	West Coast	7	7	Carlton (2006–2007)	
7	Henry Playfair	Sydney	11	10	Geelong (2003–2007)	
8	Kepler Bradley	Fremantle	9	12	Essendon (2004–2007)	
11	Benjamin Davies	North Melbourne	2	0	Collingwood (2005–2006)	
16	Brad Moran	Adelaide	7	6	North Melbourne (2006–2007)	
20	Tristan Cartledge †	Richmond	2	1	Essendon (2005–2006)	

== See also ==
- 2008 AFL season

== Bibliography ==
- Lovett, Michael, ed. (2009). AFL Record Season Guide 2009. The Slattery Media Group. ISBN 978-0-9805162-6-5.
