= Garrick (name) =

Garrick is a personal name, and is both a surname and a given name (usually masculine).

The name has two identified points of origin.

Garrick originated in Old English and/or French. Old English garrick means "one who governs with a spear", or "spear king". In French, garric is derived from an Occitan word meaning "oak tree grove".

Garrick is also an anglicised spelling and pronunciation of the Scottish name Garrioch. This variation originated in the Aberdeenshire area Garioch. The placename Garioch comes from the Gaelic word Gairbheach, meaning "place of roughness". Examples of family members using Garrioch and Garrick can be seen on adjacent gravestones in St Magnus Cathedral, Kirkwall, Orkney.

People with the name Garrick include:

== Given name ==
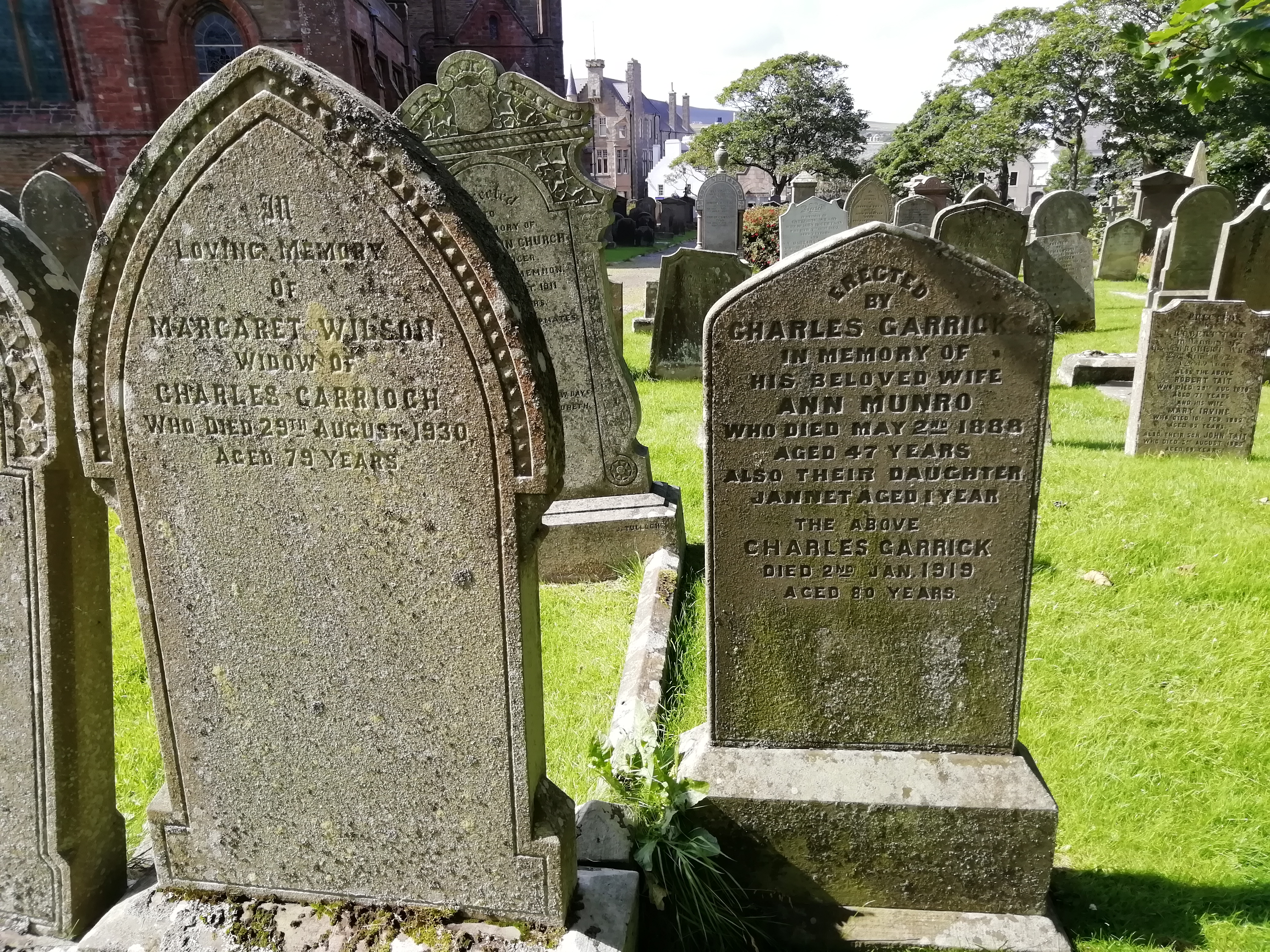
Picture of adjacent graves at St Magnus Cathedral, Kirkwall, Orkney referencing the same individual. The graves are of Charles Garrioch and his first and second wives. One stone references Charles Garrioch and the other stone references Charles Garrick showing the anglicisation of the family name

- Garrick Dowhen
- Garrick Hagon
- Garrick Higgo
- Garrick Ibbotson
- Garrick Morgan (born 1970), former Australian rugby footballer
- Garrick Ohlsson
- Garrick Palmer
- Garrick Tremain (born 1941), New Zealand cartoonist and painter
- Garrick Utley, American Journalist

== Surname ==
Garrick
Origin
- Origin: Dual Origin: Anglicised spelling and pronunciation of the name Garrioch from the Aberdeenshire Committee Area of Garioch. Also Old English/French Origin.
- Meaning: Gaelic "place of roughness". Old English/French "spear king", "oak tree grove"
- Region of origin: Old English and French

Other names
- Variant forms: Garrioch, Garioch. (Gaelic)

- Barbara Garrick (born 1965), American actress
- David Garrick (1717–1779), English actor
- David Garrick (singer) (1945–2013), English singer
- Edward Garrick (1757-?), instigator of the Boston Massacre
- Francis James Garrick (1833–1890), New Zealand politician
- Horrie Garrick (1918–1982), Australian politician
- Jack Garrick (1928–1999), New Zealand zoologist
- John Garrick (1902–1966), British film actor
- Jordon Garrick (born 1998), Jamaican footballer
- Jay Garrick, a DC Comics superhero and the first to use the name Flash
- Leon Garrick (born 1976), Jamaican cricketer
- Martin Garrick (born 1953), American politician
- Michael Garrick (born 1933), English pianist and composer
- Neville Garrick, Jamaican graphic artist, photographer, filmmaker, and writer
- Pauline Garrick, (1921–2001), Australian singer and actress
- Reuben Garrick, Australian rugby league player
- Richard Garrick (1878–1962), American director and actor
- Stanley Garrick (1888–1958), Kingdom of Benin senior administrator and courtier
- Tom Garrick (born 1966), American basketball player
