= Garnick =

Garnick is a surname. Notable people with the surname include:

- Diane Garnick (born 1967), American investment manager

== See also ==
- Garrick (name)
- Gornick
