= 2008 AFL Rising Star =

Australian rules football award

2008 NAB AFL Rising Star
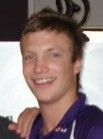
- Rhys Palmer, winner of the 2008 AFL Rising Star award
- Sponsored by: National Australia Bank
- Date: 2 September
- Country: Australia
- Ron Evans medallist: Rhys Palmer (Fremantle)

The NAB AFL Rising Star award is given annually to a stand out young player in the Australian Football League. The 2008 Ron Evans medal was given to Rhys Palmer from the Fremantle Football Club.

== Eligibility ==
Every round, an Australian Football League rising star nomination is given to a stand out young player. To be eligible for the award, a player must be under 21 on 1 January of that year, have played 10 or fewer senior games and not been suspended during the season. At the end of the year, one of the 22 nominees is the winner of award.

== Nominations ==
Round	Player	Team	Ref.
1	Bachar Houli	Essendon	
2	Josh Hill	Western Bulldogs	
3	Rhys Palmer	Fremantle	
4	Kieren Jack	Sydney	
5	Ben McKinley	West Coast	
6	Cyril Rioli	Hawthorn	
7	Austin Wonaeamirri	Melbourne	
8	Kurt Tippett	Adelaide	
9	Garrick Ibbotson	Fremantle	
10	Nathan Brown	Collingwood	
11	Matthew Kreuzer	Carlton	
12	Trent Cotchin	Richmond	
13	Jarryd Morton	Hawthorn	
14	Colin Garland	Melbourne	
15	Jack Riewoldt	Richmond	
16	Kyle Reimers	Essendon	
17	Brad Ebert	West Coast	
18	Gavin Urquhart	North Melbourne	
19	Shaun Grigg	Carlton	
20	Cale Morton	Melbourne	
21	Bradd Dalziell	Brisbane Lions	
22	Alipate Carlile	Port Adelaide	

== Final voting ==
	Player	Club	Votes
1	Rhys Palmer	Fremantle	44
2	Cyril Rioli	Hawthorn	37
3	Trent Cotchin	Richmond	21
4	Matthew Kreuzer	Carlton	11
5	Garrick Ibbotson	Fremantle	7
6	Ben McKinley	West Coast	6
7	Cale Morton	Melbourne	3
8	Alipate Carlile	Port Adelaide	2
9	Austin Wonaeamirri	Melbourne	1
Source: AFL Record Season Guide 2015
