= Rhys Palmer =

Australian rules footballer

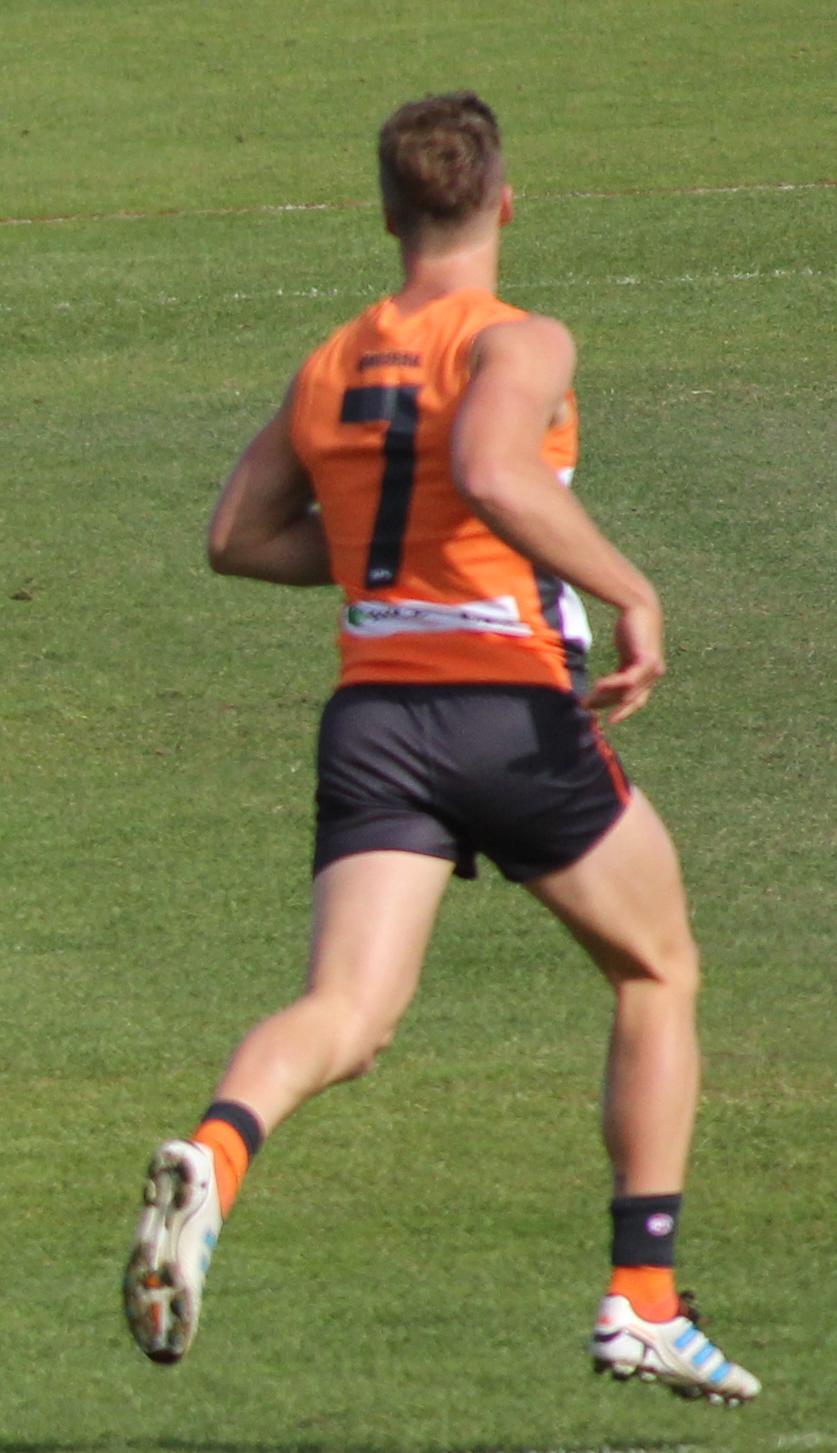
- Palmer playing for Greater Western Sydney in 2012

Personal information
- Full name: Rhys Palmer
- Born: 13 February 1989 (age 37)
- Original team: Bullcreek Leeming JFC / East Fremantle
- Height: 181 cm (5 ft 11 in)
- Weight: 82 kg (181 lb)
- Position: Forward

Playing career^{1}
Years	Club	Games (Goals)
2008–2011	Fremantle	53 (23)
2012–2016	Greater Western Sydney	69 (72)
2017	Carlton	1 (0)
Total		123 (95)
- ^{1} Playing statistics correct to the end of 2017.

Career highlights
- AFL Rising Star Award Ron Evans Medal 2008; AFL Players Association Best First Year Player 2008; Fremantle Beacon Award 2008; NEAFL premiership player 2016; inaugural Greater Western Sydney player

Rhys Palmer (born 13 February 1989) is a former professional Australian rules footballer who played for the Fremantle Football Club, Greater Western Sydney Giants and Carlton Football Club in the Australian Football League (AFL). He won the AFL Rising Star award in 2008.

== Early life ==
Palmer was born in 1989 and played junior football for the Bullcreek Leeming Junior Football Club.

He made his West Australian Football League (WAFL) debut for East Fremantle in 2007, playing 14 games, obtaining over 20 possessions in his final six games, include five goals in one game.

Palmer was a key member of Western Australia's victorious 2007 AFL Under 18 Championships side, averaging 32 possessions and 3 goals per game. He finished second by one vote behind Cale Morton in the Larke Medal and was named in the Under 18 All-Australian side.

Palmer gained attention again at 2007 AFL Draft Camp finishing second in the 3 km time trial with a time of 10min 25sec and fifth in the beep test with a score of 14.8.

== AFL career ==
Palmer was taken at pick #7 overall in the 2007 AFL draft by Fremantle.

He put in some impressive performances in the 2008 NAB Cup and after being named as an emergency for the opening round of the 2008 season, Palmer made his debut in Round 2 at Subiaco Oval against Hawthorn. Whilst his debut match was impressive individually, with 22 possessions and a goal, Fremantle lost the match by 15 points. In his second match he was awarded the AFL Rising Star nomination for his outstanding performance in the Western Derby, despite receiving a gash to his head in the opening quarter.

After being nominated in Round 3, Palmer won the 2008 AFL Rising Star ahead of Cyril Rioli from Hawthorn with 8 of the 9 judges voting him as the best emerging player. He missed most of the 2009 season because of a knee reconstruction.

Palmer joined Greater Western Sydney in September 2011, becoming the third uncontracted player, after Phil Davis and Callan Ward, to join the club in preparation for its entry into the AFL for the 2012 season.

At the conclusion of the 2016 season, Palmer was traded to Carlton. He made his first senior appearance for Carlton at the MCG against Essendon, as a late inclusion. Carlton recorded their first win of the season, winning by 15 points. At the conclusion of the 2017 season, he was delisted by Carlton.

In 2018 he returned to Western Australia and joined Swan Districts in the West Australian Football League (WAFL).

In March 2019 he threw his shoes onto the Gloucester Park harness racing track during the feature race. No horses or reinsmen were injured, but there were calls for Palmer to be banned for life from racetracks due to the dangerous act.

On 16 March 2019, at roughly 7:30pm local time, Palmer suffered serious injuries in a motorcycle accident in Perth, resulting in Palmer being placed in an induced coma.

Palmer has since relocated to Kalgoorlie-Boulder and continues to play football with the Kalgoorlie City Football Club (Kangas). He was awarded Best on Ground in the 2021 Grand Final and later won the club’s fairest and best award for the season.

== Statistics ==
Statistics are correct to round 19 of 2017 season

Legend
G	Goals	K	Kicks	D	Disposals	T	Tackles
B	Behinds	H	Handballs	M	Marks

Season	Team	No.	Games	Totals							Averages (per game)						
Season	Team	No.	Games	G	B	K	H	D	M	T	G	B	K	H	D	M	T
2008	Fremantle	10	20	10	8	270	192	462	100	47	0.5	0.4	13.5	9.6	23.1	5.0	2.4
2009	Fremantle	10	5	3	1	45	59	104	18	20	0.6	0.2	9.0	11.8	20.8	3.6	4.0
2010	Fremantle	10	13	4	3	113	136	249	46	52	0.3	0.2	8.7	10.5	19.2	3.5	4.0
2011	Fremantle	10	15	6	6	110	121	231	48	57	0.4	0.4	7.3	8.1	15.4	3.2	3.8
2012	Greater Western Sydney	7	15	9	9	158	128	286	66	34	0.6	0.6	10.5	8.5	19.1	4.4	2.3
2013	Greater Western Sydney	7	11	9	5	103	80	183	51	32	0.8	0.5	9.4	7.3	16.6	4.6	2.9
2014	Greater Western Sydney	7	17	23	12	147	136	283	54	49	1.4	0.7	8.6	8.0	16.6	3.2	2.9
2015	Greater Western Sydney	7	14	18	16	133	79	212	53	38	1.3	1.1	9.5	5.6	15.1	3.8	2.7
2016	Greater Western Sydney	7	12	13	7	94	73	167	53	28	1.1	0.6	7.8	6.1	13.9	4.4	2.3
2017	Carlton	24	1	0	0	6	6	12	4	2	0.0	0.0	6.0	6.0	12.0	4.0	2.0
Career			123	95	67	1179	1010	2189	493	359	0.8	0.5	9.6	8.2	17.8	4.0	2.9
