= Bachar Houli =

Australian rules footballer

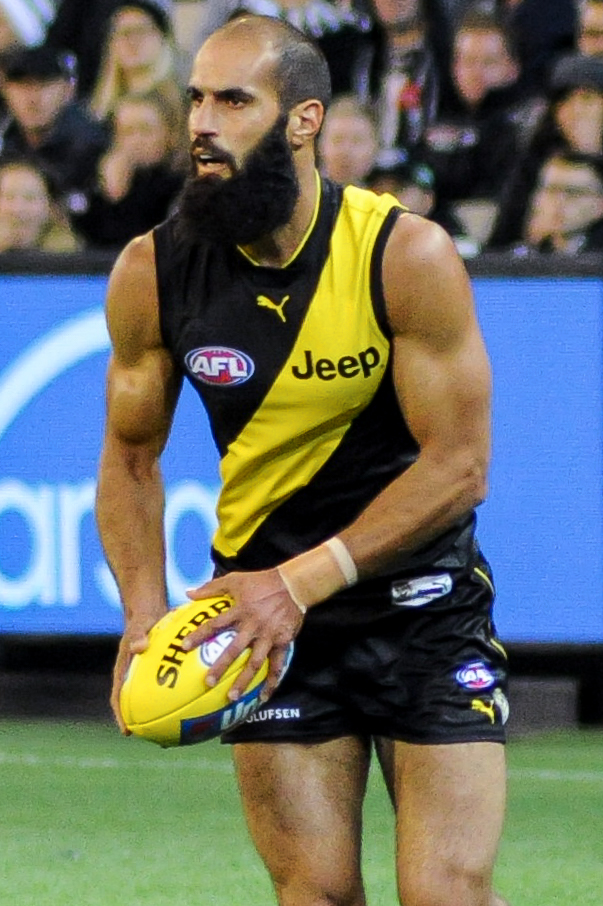
- Houli with Richmond in March 2017

Personal information
- Born: 12 May 1988 (age 38); Melbourne, Victoria
- Original teams: Western Jets (TAC Cup); Spotswood (WRFL)
- Draft: No. 42, 2006 national draft, Essendon; No. 3, 2011 pre-season draft, Richmond
- Debut: Round 7, 2007, Essendon vs. Kangaroos, at Docklands
- Height: 181 cm (5 ft 11 in)
- Weight: 83 kg (183 lb)
- Position: Defender

Playing career^{1}
Years	Club	Games (Goals)
2007–2010	Essendon	26 (9)
2011–2021	Richmond	206 (34)
Total		232 (43)

Representative team honours
Years	Team	Games (Goals)
2020	Victoria	1 (0)
- ^{1} Playing statistics correct to the end of 2021.

Career highlights
- 3× AFL premiership player: 2017, 2019, 2020; All-Australian team: 2019; Yiooken Award: 2019; AFL Rising Star nominee: 2008; Jim Stynes Community Leadership Award: 2020

Bachar Houli OAM (Arabic: بشار حولي, born 12 May 1988) is a former Australian rules footballer who played 232 games over a 15-year career with Richmond and Essendon in the Australian Football League (AFL). He is a three-time premiership player with Richmond and was named an All-Australian half-back during his 2019 premiership winning season. Houli is the first devout Muslim and third Muslim overall to play in the AFL.

In 2025, Houli will play for the Newport Football Club in the Western Football Netball League (WFNL).

== Early life and junior football ==
Houli was born in Australia to Lebanese parents who had migrated in the 1970s. He grew up in the western Melbourne suburbs of Altona North and Tarneit, and attended high school at Werribee Islamic College. He was raised a devout Muslim, praying five times a day and observing a comprehensive fast during the holy month of Ramadan.

He followed his older brothers into Australian rules football at the age of 11, but hid his participation from his parents, who preferred he focus his efforts on schooling. In his first season of competitive junior football in 2000, he won the under-12 best and fairest award while playing for Spotswood Football Club in the Western Region Football League. After that, his parents found out what he had been doing and, by his third season, they began to support his junior football endeavours, during which time he won two league best and fairest awards and earned selection to the local representative side, the Western Jets, in the TAC Cup.

In 2004, Houli was selected play for and captain the Victorian Metropolitan region at the AFL under-16 championships. In the following year, he was selected to represent the Victorian Metropolitan region side at the AFL Under 18 Championships, but was ruled out due to a back fracture. Later that year, he also suffered a torn Achilles tendon in a bike riding accident.

In 2006, Houli suffered repeated stress fractures in his back, but was able to play through, including while serving as Vic Metro vice-captain at the 2006 AFL Under 18 Championships. He kicked one goal in a match against South Australia and another two against Western Australia and was among his side's best players in each. His performances helped keep his side undefeated through three matches and earned a premiership win at the tournament.

After consulting with a sheikh, Houli decided to break his Ramadan fast for three days during the physical endurance tests at the AFL Draft Camp, after which he recorded impressive results that included top five rankings for the three-kilometre time trial (10 minutes, 10 seconds) and beep test (14.7). Prior to the 2006 national draft, AFL Media projected Houli would be taken by Essendon with the 47th pick.

== AFL career ==
=== Essendon (2007–2010) ===
==== 2007 season ====
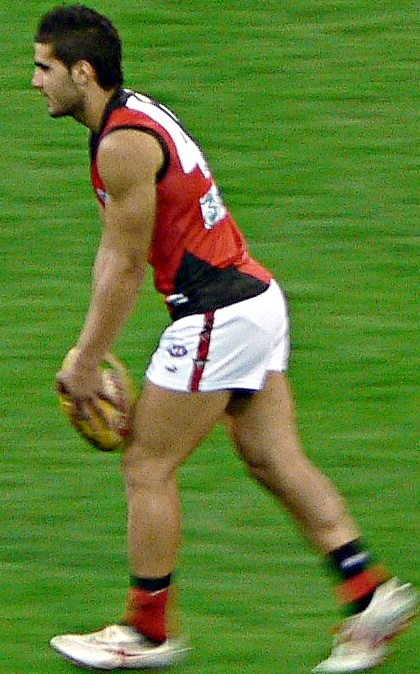
Houli with Essendon during his debut season in May 2007

In the 2006 AFL national draft, Houli was chosen by the Essendon Football Club as its fifth selection, and the 42nd pick overall.

He first represented Essendon in an exhibition match against the Indigenous All-Stars in Darwin in early February 2007. Houli spent the opening weeks of the season playing reserves-grade football with the club's VFL-affiliate Bendigo Bombers, where he played as a half-forward and midfielder and recorded 30 or more disposals in three of his first five matches. Following those performances, he earned an AFL debut in a round 7 match against the Kangaroos, where he recorded 15 disposals and kicked a goal with his first kick in AFL football. Houli followed that effort with a two-goal showing in round 8, before lesser performances in round 9 and 10 saw him returned to VFL level for the rest of the 2007 season. He finished the year having played four AFL matches and averaged 11 disposals and 0.75 goals per game.

==== 2008 season ====
Houli turned in a series of strong performances in the 2008 pre-season NAB Cup tournament, including with 17 disposals in the first half of a match against West Coast that saw AFL Media label him among his side's best players. In addition to previous roles as a half-forward and midfielder, he began playing as a half-back during this time. Those efforts saw him hold his place into the season-proper, where he played in a dual role as midfielder and half-back and recorded 26 disposals in a win over the Kangaroos that earned him the league's first Rising Star nomination of the year. Though he missed round 9 with a virus, Houli otherwise held his place at senior level over the first 11 weeks of the season, playing primarily on the club's half-back line, including with a two-goal, 23-disposal game in round 5 that earned him his first Brownlow Medal vote. To that point he ranked third in the club's best and fairest count. Houli missed round 12's match against West Coast with a groin injury, which after several weeks of rehabilitation and little progress, was identified as the beginning of osteitis pubis. The injury required surgery to repair and would effectively rule him out for the remainder of the season. Houli played 10 AFL matches and averaged 19 disposals per game in 2008, earning himself 17th place in the club's best and fairest count.

==== 2009 season ====
After returning from injury, Houli regained his spot in Essendon's best 22 for the opening round of the 2009 season. Despite six marks and 18 disposals, Houli was dropped back to reserves level immediately following that match. Houli was regularly named a non-playing AFL emergency over the following six weeks and earned media praise from Essendon officials for his VFL output, before being recalled for round 7 of the AFL season. He held his spot at senior level for a further five weeks, including in round 10 where he recorded a then career-best 31 disposals. Houli missed round 12 due to a virus, but was not immediately recalled to AFL football following his recovery. Instead, he spent another seven matches at the lower level with consistently strong performances before returning for a single match at AFL level in round 19. Houli suffered a leg injury while training in the week that followed, with scans later revealing it to be a fractured fibula that would rule him out for the rest of the 2009 season. He finished the year having played just seven matches, but again lifting his disposals output to 22.4 per game.

==== 2010 season ====
Houli recovered from his 2009 injury to complete a full pre-season training program ahead of the 2010 season, but he started the year outside the club's AFL 22. After playing VFL football with Bendigo, he made consecutive AFL appearances with 25 and 19 disposals in round 3 and 4 respectively, before being dropped back to the reserves ahead of round 5. Despite strong and consistently high output performances, Houli was restricted to VFL football for the longest period of his career with 13 weeks away, before finally earning an AFL recall in round 17. He played just three matches at AFL level before he was again dropped back to reserves level following a round 19 loss to Carlton. Houli featured in the club's VFL elimination final that September, a match which fell during the fasting daylight hours of Ramadan for the first time of his professional career. He committed to maintain a strict fast, a decision he would later vowed never to repeat after losing five kilograms over the course of the game and nearly passing out repeatedly during the heavy loss. In future daytime Ramadan games he would maintain minimum energy and hydration with small amounts of water and carbohydrate gell. Houli finished the year averaging 20 disposals per game over five appearances at AFL level, and placed third in the Bendigo Bombers' best and fairest count after spending most of the season at reserves level.

Houli came out of contract at the end of the 2010 season bearing significant frustration towards Essendon after failing to gain regular senior selection under departing coach Matthew Knights. Despite consulting with the newly appointed Essendon coach James Hird in October, Houli formalised his rejection of a contract extension by requesting a trade to Richmond. After protracted negotiations in which Fox Footy and the Herald Sun reported Essendon has demanded a second-round pick and Richmond had offered a third rounder in pick 46, no trade could be agreed to by the two clubs. Though Essendon retained his rights, Houli's ongoing refusal to sign with the club saw him instead nominate for the forthcoming pre-season draft. He departed Essendon after four years and 26 AFL games at the club.

=== Richmond (2011–2021) ===
==== 2011 season ====
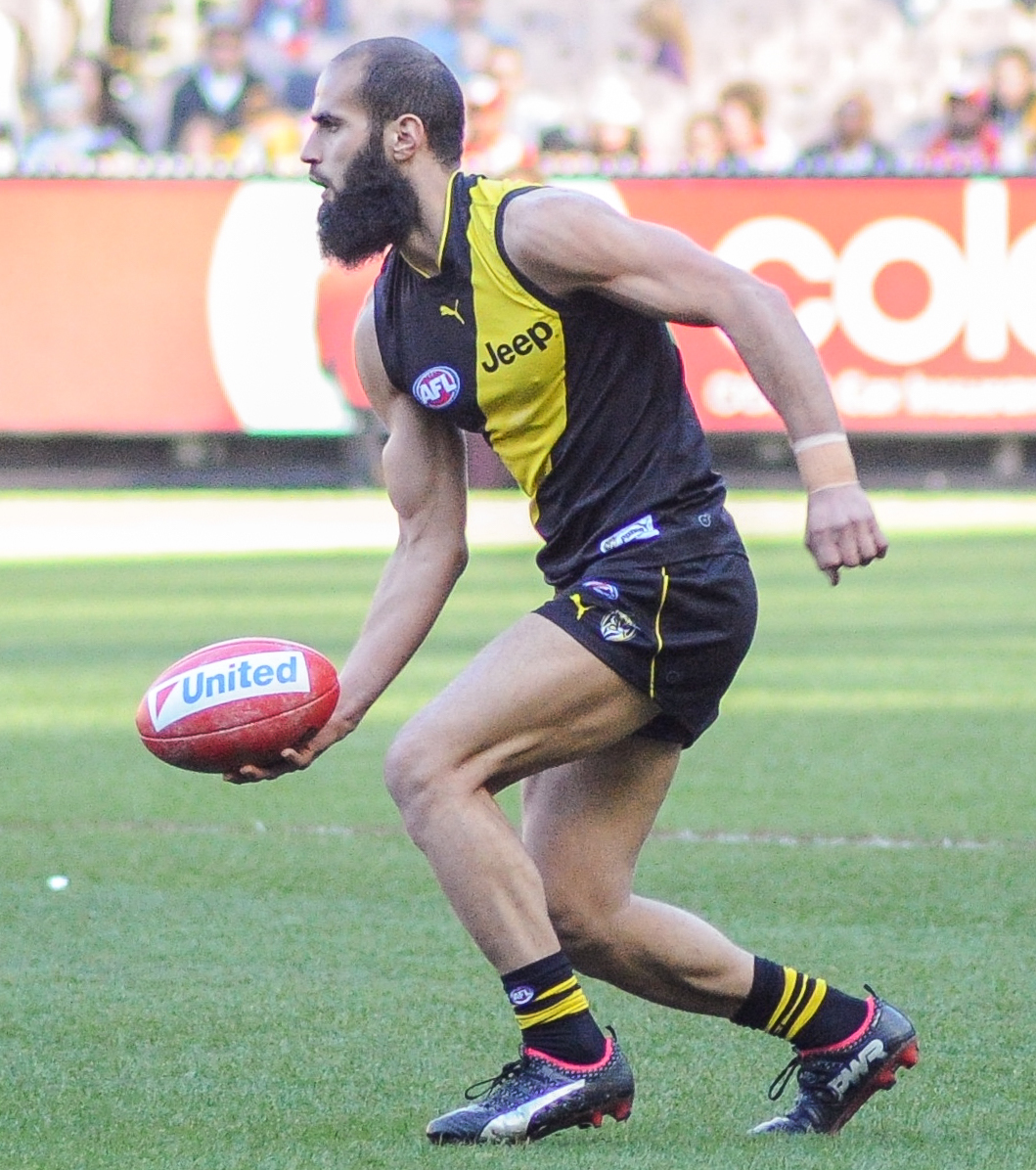
Houli handballs during play in round 13, 2017

After the failed trade talks, Houli was drafted by Richmond with the club's first selection and the third pick overall in the pre-season draft.

He immediately earned AFL selection, making his debut for the club in round 1's season opening match against Carlton. In round 5, Houli recorded 30 disposals and was named by AFL Media as one of his side's best players. He played a dual role as a midfielder and defender and continued to impress over the following months, including with a two-goal haul in round 7's win over Fremantle and 30 or more disposals in rounds 6, 10 and 17. Houli was also best afield and received the maximum three Brownlow Medal votes following a then career-best 32 disposals in a round 21 win over Sydney. By season's end Houli had solidified himself as an important rebounding half-back for Richmond, playing in all 22 matches that season and earning the Fred Swift Medal for fourth place in the club's best and fairest count.

==== 2012 season ====
Houli began the 2012 season in what AFL Media described as "good touch", averaging 25 disposals across the opening three rounds of the year. Houli signed a new two-year contract extension with the club in late June, to which point he averaged 22 disposals per game over 12 consecutive matches that year. In round 22, AFL Media named Houli one of Richmond's best players with 26 disposals in a win over Essendon, while in round 23, Houli received four Coaches' Association Award votes as the equal third best player in a draw with Port Adelaide. Houli finished the season having played in all 22 matches for the second straight season, while recording the second most rebound 50s and fifth most disposals of any player at the club that year. He also placed equal 10th in the club's best and fairest count.

==== 2013 season ====
As a half-back flanker, he is elite at what he does. He wins the ball back well, he uses it effectively by hand and foot, and he plays the role that we want in the side to an elite level.

— Damien Hardwick, Richmond coach, March 2013

Prior to the 2013 season, Houli was labelled "elite" by the AFL's statistical partner Champion Data who placed him in the very top category of general defenders in the league. He played a full suite of pre-season matches and started the season well, including with a career-high 13 marks in round's win over Melbourne. Two weeks later he recorded 25 disposals in a win over West Coast that earned him three Coaches' Award votes as the fourth best player on the field. He bettered that output following the round 11 bye, attracting four coaches votes and one Brownlow Medal vote for 26 disposals and seven rebound-50s in a win over Adelaide in round 12, before earning another two Brownlow votes for a 25 disposal and one goal performance against Western Bulldogs in round 13. Houli was named to play but eventually a late withdrawal with hamstring soreness in round 15, and would ultimately miss one further game with the injury before making a return in round 17. At the end of the home and away season, Houli underwent scans to diagnose minor abductor pain he had been dealing with for most of the season. He was declared fit enough to play in his first finals match and the club's first finals appearance in 12 years, contributing 20 disposals in a knockout elimination final loss to Carlton. Houli finished the year having played 21 matches and placed 10th in the club's best and fairest count.

==== 2014 season ====
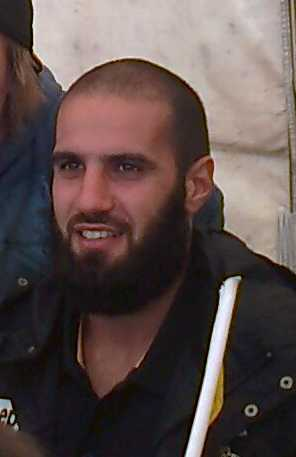
Houli in February 2014

Houli signed a new two-year contract extension before the start of the 2014 season and started the year averaging 20 disposals per game over the first eight matches of the season. He played his 100th AFL match in a 113-point demolition of Greater Western Sydney in round 10, in which he managed 26 disposals and kicked two goals. Four weeks later he recorded a then-career-high 33 disposals in a loss to Sydney. Through the first 16 rounds of the year, Houli was having what club legend and media commentator Matthew Richardson described as "a fairly consistent season", but it round 17 he put in what Richardson called Houli's best game of the year. For a performance that included 23 disposals, seven rebound-50s and a goal in that win over Port Adelaide, Houli was also labelled the equal-best player on field by The Age. In round 22 Houli recorded an equal-game high 29 disposals, after which point he ranked 14th in the league for total uncontested possessions that season. Houli featured in Richmond's finals campaign in 2014, but was again limited to one game when his side was knocked out in an elimination final loss to Port Adelaide. He was among his side's best players in the loss, with 27 disposals and four marks. Later that month, Houli represented Richmond in Grand Final sprint during the game's half-time break. Houli finished the season having played all 23 matches that year including one final, and placed ninth in the club's best and fairest award.

==== 2015 season ====
After a strong pre-season showing, Houli started the 2015 season in good form with a 32 disposals, 11 intercepts and nine rebound-50s in a round 3 performance that earned him eight coaches votes as second best on ground in that win over the Brisbane Lions. Houli was subject to racial vilification during the following week's match, with radio broadcaster John Burns later apologising publicly for yelling slurs from the stands at Houli while attending the round 5 match between Richmond and Melbourne. Houli responded with a fantastic performance in round 6, recording game-highs of nine marks and 33 disposals along with one goal to earn six coaches votes as Richmond's best player in the loss to Geelong. He played his 100th match for Richmond in round 13 and after 16 rounds he ranked fourth in the league for total rebound-50s that season. Houli continued to add strong performances in the final weeks of the season, including with two goals and 29 disposals in round 21 and with another goal when played as a forward for parts of the final game of the home and away season. For the third straight season, Houli and his Richmond side earned a spot in the finals but were contained to just one match, this time losing an elimination final to North Melbourne in which Houli recorded 17 disposals. He finished the year having played all 23 possible games and ranked second in the league for total rebound-50s. Houli earned a top 10 finish in the club best and fairest for the fifth straight season, placing ninth.

==== 2016 season ====
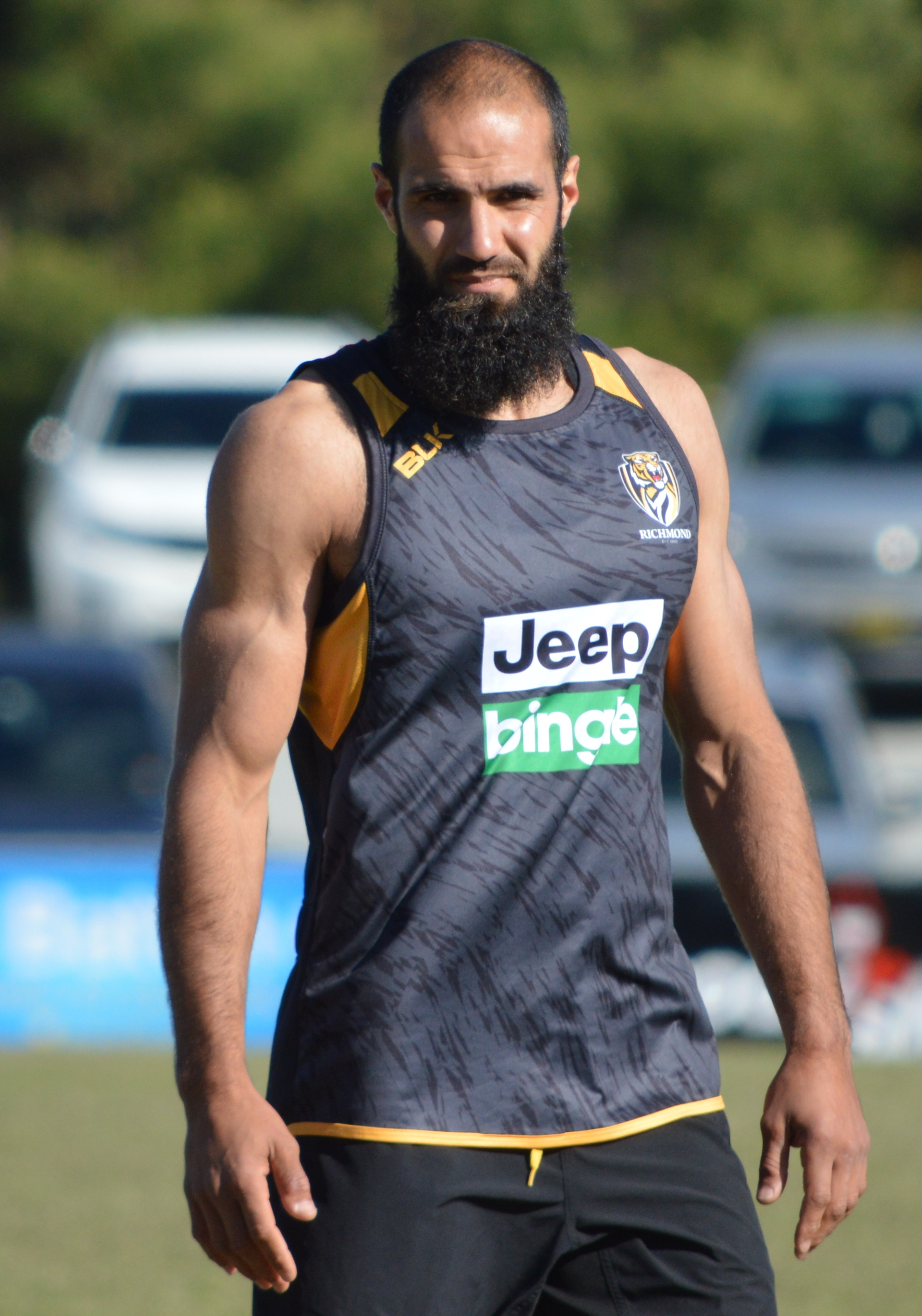
Houli training with Richmond in December 2016

Houli showed elite ball-winning form in the 2016 pre-season and carried this into the early weeks of the season proper, breaking his own career-best total in consecutive weeks with 35 and 36 disposals in rounds 2 and 3, respectively. He led the side with 34 disposals in a round 6 loss to Port Adelaide, but his uneven impacts saw AFL Media label his output "subdued" over the opening seven weeks of the season. In the lead up to round 8, Houli suffered a broken right wrist while training. The injury required surgery to repair and took more than 10 weeks to fully heal. He made his return through the VFL in late-July, in what was his first reserves grade match since joining Richmond from Essendon in 2010. After a successful run at the lower level, Houli returned to AFL football in round 19 with 21 disposals in a loss to Greater Western Sydney. He returned to form with 30 disposals and a match-high six inside-50s in round 20 and after 22 rounds he ranked seventh in the league for average rebound-50s and eighth for marks per game that season. After playing in each of the club's final five matches of the season, Houli finished the year having played 12 AFL matches and placed 17th in the club's best and fairest count. During the off-season he entertained a long-term contract offer from Greater Western Sydney, but ultimately turned it down to remain at Richmond.

==== 2017 season ====
Houli experienced an interrupted 2016/17 pre-season training program due to a persistent but minor hamstring injury, though ultimately managed game time in the pre-season series before lining up for his 150th AFL game in round 1's win over Carlton. In round 5 he received one coaches vote for 24 disposals in an ANZAC Day eve win over Melbourne. Houli then turned in exceptional performances on either of the side of the round 12 bye, with 31 disposals, eight intercepts and seven coaches votes in round 11 to go with 28 disposals, seven rebound-50s and two coaches votes in round 13. He was named among the club's best players the following week in a match against Carlton but was reported for striking opponent Jed Lamb in the head with an off-ball, blind round arm swing in the first quarter of that win. Houli successful argued the penalty from four weeks down to two at the AFL Tribunal with a defence that featured character statements from witnesses including broadcaster Waleed Aly and Prime Minister Malcolm Turnbull. In an unprecedented move, the AFL appealed the decision of their own independent tribunal, with the appeals board later ruling to increase Houli's suspension to four weeks. Houli returned to football with 25 disposals and nine score involvements in round 19's win over Gold Coast and played in each of the club's final five home and away season matches. He contributed 20 disposals in a qualifying win over Geelong in the opening week of the finals and added another 21 disposals and seven marks in a preliminary final performance AFL Media described as "instrumental in the Tigers maintaining momentum" in the win over Greater Western Sydney. Houli was among the best players in the 2017 AFL Grand Final, notching 25 disposals and kicking a goal in a win over Adelaide that earned him a perfect ten coaches votes along with second place in the Norm Smith Medal voting. His contribution helped Richmond to its first premiership in 37 years and made Houli a premiership player in his 11th season in the AFL. Houli also placed equal-eighth in the club's best and fairest count.

==== 2018 season ====
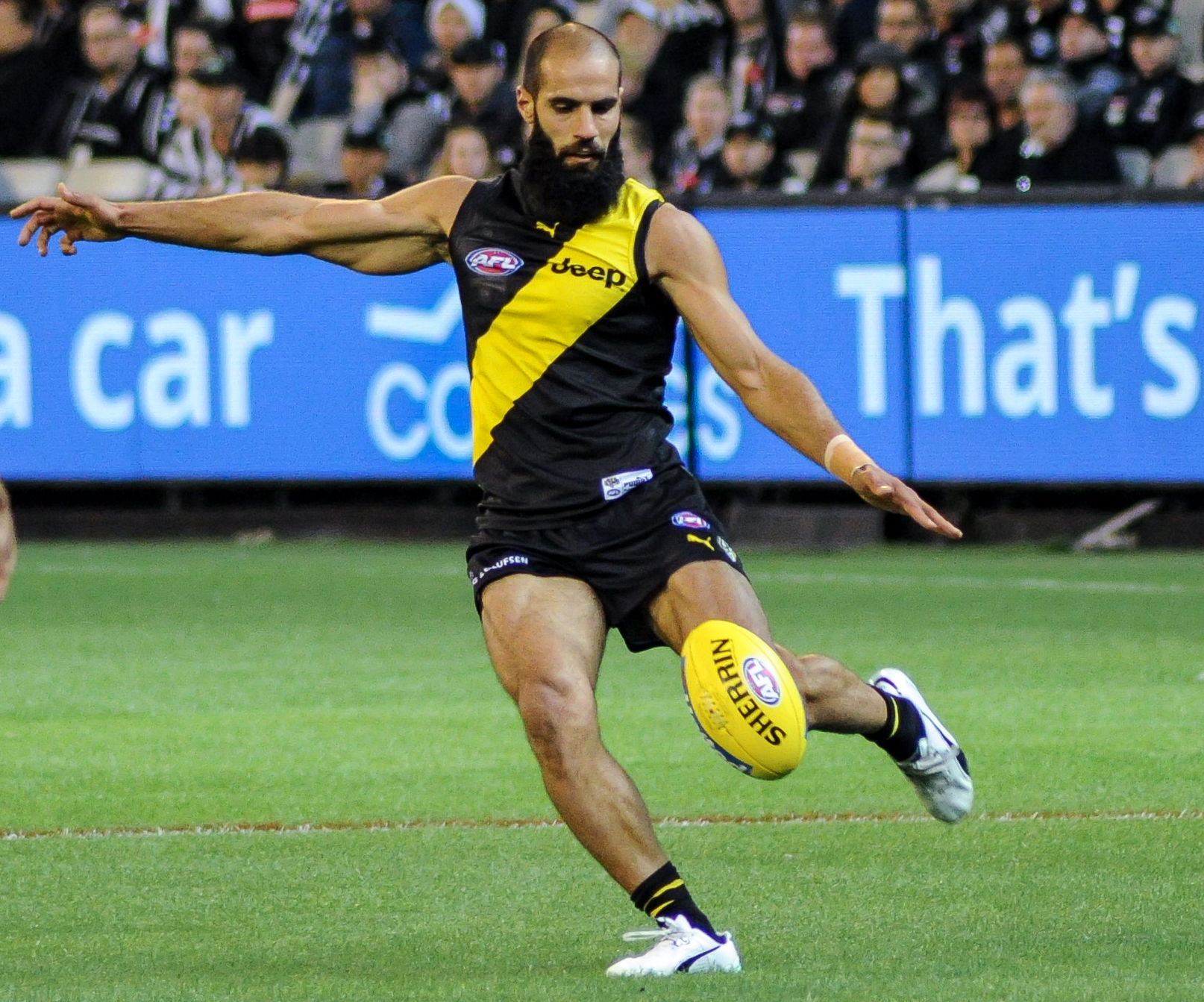
Houli kicking in round 2, 2017

Houli suffered a minor calf injury in the club's opening pre-season match of 2018, the recovery for which held him out of the rest of the pre-season series and from the round 1 match-up against Carlton. He returned to fitness for round 2's grand final rematch against Adelaide and contributed 17 disposals. AFL Media named Houli among Richmond's best players in four of the next five matches, including in his 150th match for Richmond in round 7. In the first quarter of round 10's match against St Kilda, Houli suffered a serious groin injury while kicking that saw him removed from the game after notching just four disposals. Although the injury did not require surgery, Houli spent six weeks rehabilitating the muscle, during which time he also underwent finger surgery to repair an unrelated injury. He made a return to football in round 17, but further groin soreness forced him to limit the stint to just one match. Houli spent a further two weeks on the sidelines before making a return to football in limited game time in one VFL match in early August. Finally fit, Houli played at AFL level again in round 21 and earned one coaches vote for a 26-disposal outing against Gold Coast. Houli was an honoury captain the following week, joining fellow Muslim player and Essendon opponent Adam Saad to toss the coin in support of the Muslim-Australian community who had been the subject of Islamophobic comments by conservative Senator Fraser Anning in Parliament that week. After helping Richmond to the minor premiership as the ladder-leading side at the end of the home-and-away season, Houli contributed 24 disposals and four tackles in a qualifying final win over Hawthorn. Houli was one of Richmond's few strong contributors in the preliminary final the following week, notching up 22 disposals and a goal in what would prove a shock knockout loss to Collingwood that ended Richmond's season and limited Houli to just 15 matches at AFL level that year.

==== 2019 season ====
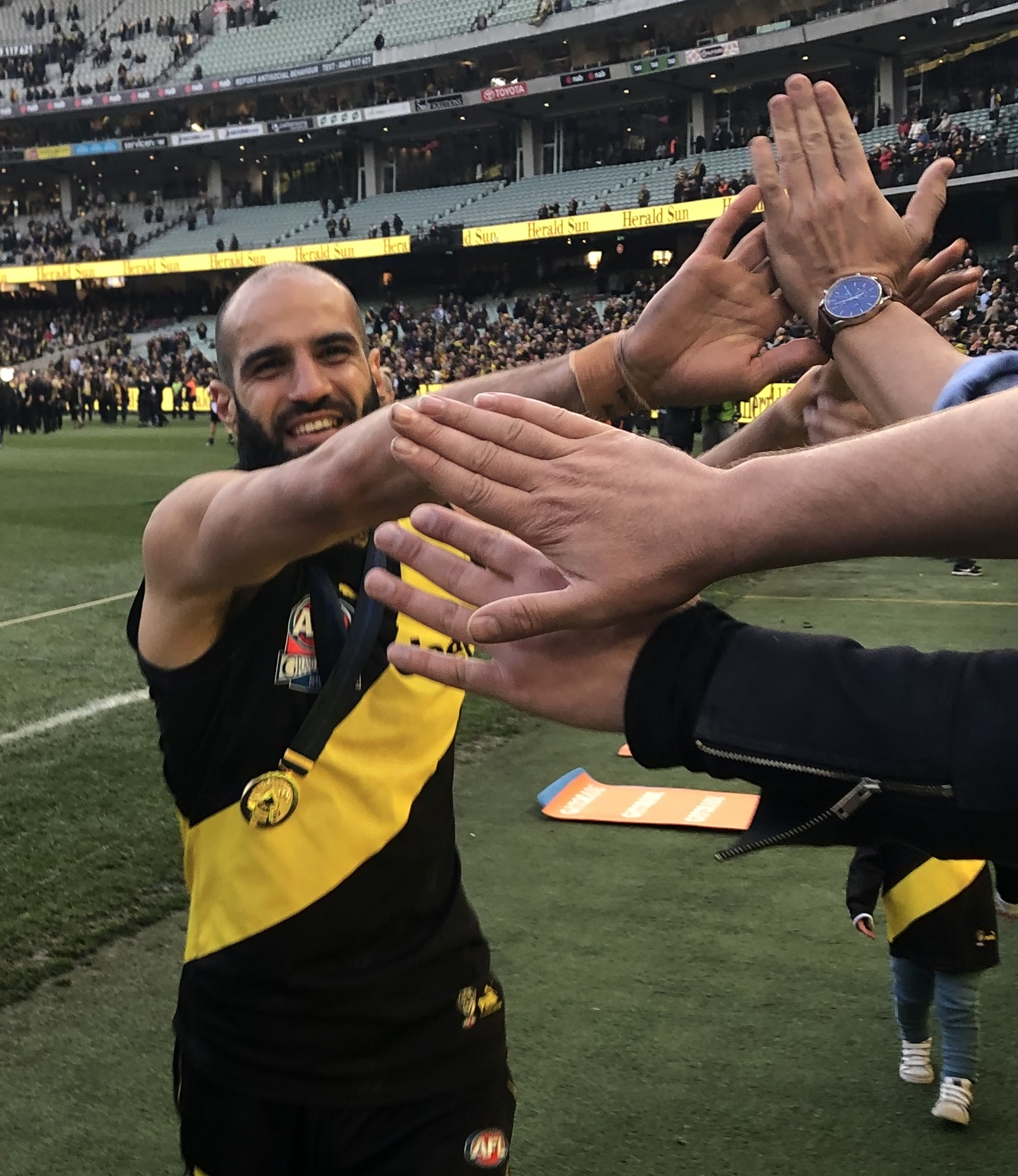
Houli celebrates a second premiership after the 2019 AFL Grand Final

Houli found great form in the 2019 pre-season series before contributing 24 disposals as one of Richmond's best in the season-opening match against Carlton. He suffered a minor hamstring strain during that match and missed three weeks of football to rest the muscle, before returning in round 5's win over Sydney. Houli earned seven coaches votes as second best on ground with a match-high 32 disposals the following week, and a further four votes as third best on ground with 35 disposals in round 9. In the Dreamtime at the 'G match in round 10, Houli received the Yiooken Award as best on ground for a performance that included a career-high 37 disposals and 814 metres gained. To that point, Houli ranked fourth among all players in the league for effective disposals per game and sixth in average metres gained. Houli quickly revised his own career best mark the following week, adding 38 disposals in a loss to North Melbourne that helped him in maintaining a career-best average of 29.3 disposals per game at the mid-season bye. In round 19, he played his 200th AFL match, and recorded 31 disposals, his seventh tally above 30 touches in 15 games to that point in 2019. Houli continued his form through the final weeks of the season and received coaches votes in rounds 20, 22 and 23 for another three matches with 30 or more disposals. At the end of the home and away season, Houli was named in the All-Australian team for the first time in his career and recorded a career-best 11 Brownlow Medal votes. In the opening week of the finals, Houli contributed 15 disposals in his side's qualifying final victory of the Brisbane Lions. He was among his side's best in the preliminary final a fortnight later, notching 32 disposals and 11 marks to help Richmond to a comeback win over Geelong and a place in the grand final. Houli became a two-time premiership player the following week after Richmond defeated Greater Western Sydney by 89 points in the 2019 AFL Grand Final. Once again, Houli placed second behind Dustin Martin for best afield honours, after a fantastic performance that included 26 disposals and seven marks. Houli placed third in the Coaches' Association's Gary Ayres award for player of the finals and was named as the league's third best defender and 24th best player overall in the Herald Sun chief football reporter Mark Robinson's list of the league's best players in 2019. After a season in which he played 22 matches, became a two-time premiership player and earned an All-Australian honour, Houli also placed seventh in the club's best and fairest count.

==== 2020 season ====
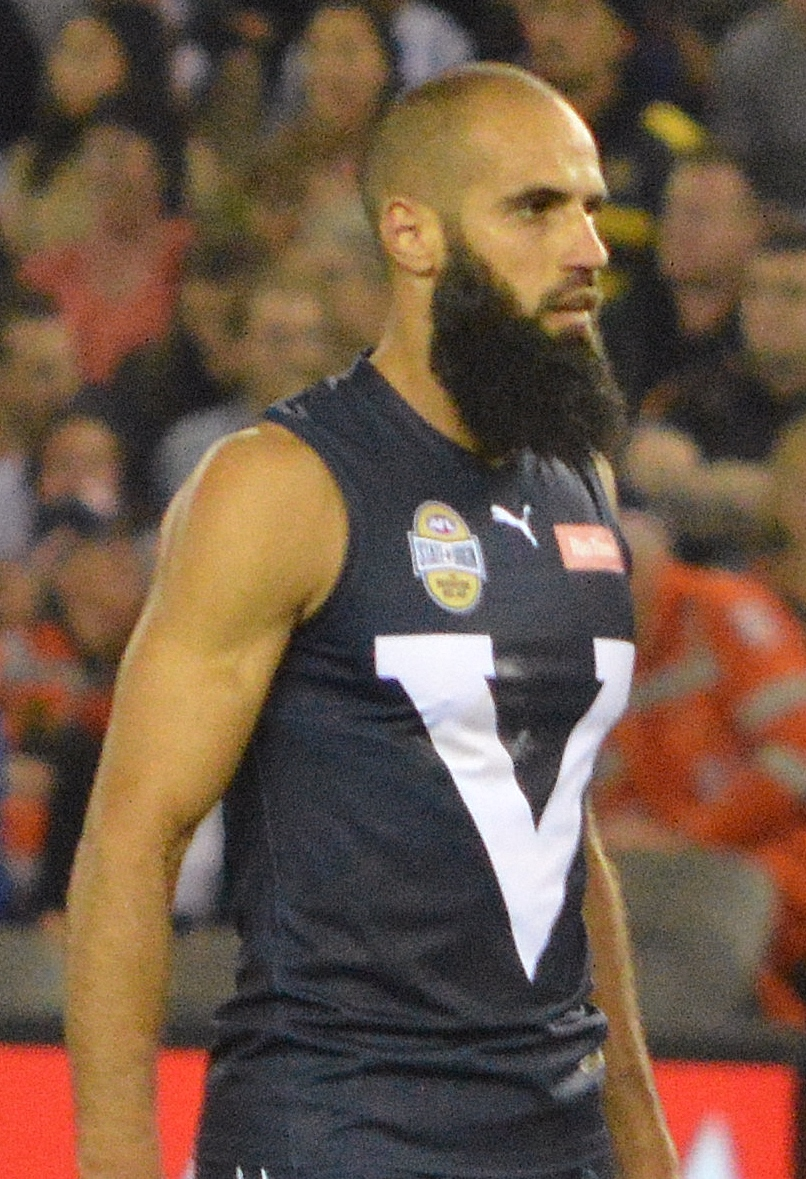
Houli representing Victoria at the State of Origin for Bushfire Relief Match in February 2020

Houli suffered from a calf strain in the 2019/20 off-season that limited his training load until early February. He returned to fitness in time to play his first match for the year in the AFL's fundraising State of Origin for Bushfire Relief Match in February, where he helped Victoria to a 46-point victory over the All-Stars. Houli sat out Richmond's first pre-season match that same weekend but returned for the club's final pre-season match against Greater Western Sydney a week later. In the week leading into round 1, Houli suffered a calf strain while training that would rule him out from the season opening match against Carlton. He was able to rest the injury over an extraordinary 11-week break, after the AFL Commission that weekend suspended the season due to state border crossing restrictions enforced as a result of the rapid progression of the coronavirus pandemic into Australia. Despite some continuing calf troubles during the break, Houli made his return when the league did, featuring in round 2's draw with Collingwood when it was finally played in the second week of June. Houli was best on ground in the coaches eyes during that match, recording eight Coaches Association Award votes for a performance that included a team-high 26 disposals and eight marks. Like round 1, that match was held with playing time reduced by one fifth as part of a shortened 17-round season that required a condensed fixture later in the year. Houli continued to contribute strongly through round 5's win over Melbourne, after which point a virus outbreak in Melbourne caused the club to relocate to the Gold Coast. With the relocation occurring just days after the birth of his third child, Houli and his family opted to remain in Melbourne for most of July, before flying to Queensland and entering a 14-day quarantine in the final week of July. Houli emerged from quarantine in mid-August and returned to AFL football in round 13's Dreamtime in Darwin match against Essendon. He was among his side's best players one week later, earning two coaches votes in a win over West Coast for a performance that included 23 disposals, five intercepts and a game-high 526 metres-gained. Houli played in each of the final three matches of the regular season, before contributing 17 disposals in a qualifying final loss to the Brisbane Lions in the opening week of the finals. He was second best on ground in a semi-final win over St Kilda the following week, notching eight rebound-50s and a personal season-best 32 disposals and earning five coaches votes. Houli added 15 disposals in a preliminary final win over Port Adelaide, before becoming a three-time premiership player with a 31-point grand final win over Geelong one week later. He suffered a torn calf muscle early in that match, but recorded 11 disposals while playing on through to the end of play due to a concussion ruling out fellow defender Nick Vlastuin for the entire match. In addition to his premiership silverware, Houli placed 20th in the club best and fairest award and earned the league's Jim Stynes Community Leadership Award for his work in promoting social cohesion with Muslim youth through the Bachar Houli Foundation.

==== 2021 season ====
Houli spent the entirety of the 2020/21 off-season rehabbing the calf injury sustained in the 2020 grand final. After missing the club's only official pre-season match and the first three matches of the regular season, Houli made his return from injury in managed minutes in a VFL practice match in early April. After one game at the lower level, he was declared for a top-flight return, which he made in the club's fourth-round match against Port Adelaide at the Adelaide Oval. In round 7, he was rated fourth-best on ground, earning four coaches award votes for a performance that included 10 marks, six inside-50s and a team-high 31 disposals in Richmond's win over the Western Bulldogs. In round 9, Houli played his 200th AFL match for Richmond, recording 21 disposals in the win over the Giants. He received one coaches vote the following week for a 27-disposal performance in a loss to the Brisbane Lions. Houli played in each of the club's next five matches, before suffering an ankle injury in the final period of round 16's loss to Gold Coast. Post-game scans revealed a mild syndesmosis injury that would require surgery to repair and that placed Houli in doubt to play again that season. Despite attempts to recover in August, Houli was ultimately unable to return to fitness before the club's season concluded at the end of the home and away season. In the week prior to that final round, Houli announced his retirement from AFL football, despite telling the media one week prior that it was intention to continue on into 2022. Houli finished the season having played 12 AFL matches.

Houli's retirement concluded a 15-year AFL career which included four years at Essendon and three premierships over 11 years at Richmond. He played a total of 232 games over that time and was recognised with All-Australian honours on one occasion.

== Player profile ==
Houli was a left-foot kicker who played as a rebounding half-back. He was notable for combining his long kicking power and physical running ability to provide forward momentum and metreage off half-back.

He spent his first 18 months at AFL level rotating between various roles including the midfield and half-forward, before settling into a more permanent role as half-back in his second and third seasons.

By the commencement of his seventh AFL season, Houli was ranked statistically among the best players in the league in his position. In 2019, Houli was the only general defender rated by Champion Data in the top category for all of disposals, metres gained, and intercept possessions; and, in 2020, Houli was named by the Herald Sun as Richmond's 13th-best player of the AFL era.

== AFL statistics ==
Legend
G	Goals	K	Kicks	D	Disposals	T	Tackles
B	Behinds	H	Handballs	M	Marks
#	Played in that season's premiership team

Season	Team	No.	Games	Totals							Averages (per game)							Votes
Season	Team	No.	Games	G	B	K	H	D	M	T	G	B	K	H	D	M	T	Votes
2007	Essendon	43	4	3	5	20	24	44	17	5	0.8	1.3	5.0	6.0	11.0	4.3	1.3	0
2008	Essendon	43	10	4	3	82	108	190	35	36	0.4	0.3	8.2	10.8	19.0	3.5	3.6	1
2009	Essendon	43	7	0	1	67	90	157	33	16	0.0	0.1	9.6	12.9	22.4	4.7	2.3	0
2010	Essendon	43	5	2	4	46	54	100	24	17	0.4	0.4	9.2	10.8	20.0	4.8	3.4	0
2011	Richmond	14	22	5	6	273	205	478	127	55	0.2	0.3	12.4	9.3	21.7	5.8	2.5	3
2012	Richmond	14	22	3	3	270	201	471	110	48	0.1	0.1	12.3	9.1	21.4	5.0	2.2	0
2013	Richmond	14	21	6	5	286	180	466	130	39	0.3	0.2	13.6	8.6	22.2	6.2	1.9	5
2014	Richmond	14	23	5	6	290	205	495	104	57	0.2	0.3	12.6	8.9	21.5	4.5	2.5	0
2015	Richmond	14	23	5	2	323	188	511	126	59	0.2	0.1	14.0	8.2	22.2	5.5	2.6	2
2016	Richmond	14	12	0	3	175	124	299	80	29	0.0	0.3	14.6	10.3	24.9	6.7	2.4	0
2017^{#}	Richmond	14	21	5	9	291	205	496	108	75	0.2	0.4	13.9	9.8	23.6	5.1	3.6	1
2018	Richmond	14	15	3	6	175	141	316	71	26	0.2	0.4	11.7	9.4	21.1	4.7	1.7	0
2019^{#}	Richmond	14	22	1	0	362	250	612	141	58	0.0	0.0	16.5	11.4	27.8	6.4	2.6	11
2020^{#} (Note: The 2020 season was played with 17 home-and-away matches per team (down from 22) and 16-minute quarters with time on (down from 20-minute quarters with time on) due to the impact of the COVID-19 pandemic.)	Richmond	14	13	0	1	131	111	242	48	28	0.0	0.1	10.1	8.5	18.6	3.7	2.2	1
2021	Richmond	14	12	1	0	159	116	275	77	40	0.1	0.0	13.3	9.7	22.9	6.4	3.3	3
Career			232	43	52	2950	2202	5152	1231	588	0.2	0.2	12.7	9.5	22.2	5.3	2.5	27

== Honours and achievements ==
Team

- 3× AFL premiership player (Richmond): 2017, 2019, 2020
- McClelland Trophy (Richmond): 2018

Individual

- All-Australian: 2019
- Fred Swift Medal (4th RFC B&F): 2011
- AFL Rising Star nominee: 2008
- Yiooken Award: 2019
- Jim Stynes Community Leadership Award: 2020

Junior

- U18 national champion: 2006
- U16 Victoria Metro captain: 2004

== Personal life ==
Houli was the first devout Muslim and third Muslim overall to play in the AFL, following on from Adem Yze and Sedat Sir. He is also only the second player of a Lebanese background to play in the AFL after Mil Hanna did so in the 1980s and 90s. His family hail from Mish Mish in the Akkar District of Lebanon.

Houli sought permission from local religious leaders to break his Ramadan fast on AFL match days and to limit his training load during the holy month. Houli observes the fasting requirements associated with Ramadan; during his career, he has made various adjustments, including altering training sessions to accommodate this. He observes fasting during AFL matches as well, but he will break his fast on occasion by drinking water or sports drinks in-game if he is close to dehydration.

In September 2009, Houli married his partner and family friend Rouba Abou-Zeid. The pair have two daughters, born 2014 and 2017, as well as a son born in 2020.

In June 2023, Houli was involved a in a serious crash on a private property in the Snowy Mountains area. He was initially taken to Albury Hospital with a broken pelvis and shoulder, as well as a punctured lung.

In October 2023, Houli ignited controversy after sharing a pro-Palestine video on social media regarding the Israeli–Palestinian conflict. Houli initially ignored a takedown request from former club Richmond. However, after AFL intervention, Houli was convinced to take down the video, and he issued an apology:

As many would know I am a man of faith and peace, and have always tried to live my life through the Islamic values of Respect, Peace and Love which has been taught through our beloved prophet Muhammad (PBUH). I will always advocate for inclusion and bringing people together. The last couple of weeks have taken a heavy toll on us all and I want to remind people that I do NOT condone killings of ANY INNOCENT people regardless of their faith or culture.

=== Community work ===
Houli has become a community leader and particular inspiration for young Australian Muslims participating in Australian rules football and community sport. He began working to develop an Islamic schools program as an AFL multicultural ambassador in 2012. The same year, Houli successfully approached AFL CEO Andrew Demetriou to ask that the league establish designated prayer rooms at AFL venues to allow members of the Muslim community to attend matches and still adhere to the religious requirement to pray five times a day. Houli established the Bachar Houli Academy in 2012 to provide community engagement and an elite development pathway for young Muslim footballers. Again in 2012, he established the Bachar Houli Cup an intra-school football competition for Islamic schools that culminates in an annual national tournament. The program was nominated for an international Beyond Sport award in 2013. In 2019, Houli established the Bachar Houli Foundation to be based at Richmond's Punt Road Oval, which would provide administration space to continue the various football and leadership programs already established.

He was praised for his community engagement work in 2017 by Prime Minister Malcolm Turnbull, who said Houli's work with Muslim youth was of "extreme and extraordinary importance". In 2012, Houli received the inaugural Award for Muslim and non-Muslim Understanding, awarded by the Australia Day Council and the University of South Australia's Centre for Muslim and non-Muslim Understanding. In 2021, Houli received the Anti-Defamation League's Torch of Justice Award for his community work and stand against racism, hate and bullying.

=== Autobiography ===
In November 2020, Houli wrote an autobiography entitled Bachar Houli: Faith, Football and Family, which was published by Penguin Books. The book had a foreword written by Waleed Aly. Houli also recorded an audiobook version.

== See also ==
- Islam in Australia
