= George A. Garrick =

Nigerian high jumper

George Adeniji Garrick of Siluko, MB ChB(8 April 1917 – 12 July 1988) held Nigeria's high jump record from 1938 until 1952.

== Background ==
Born in Lagos on 8 April 1917, George Adeniji Garrick was the eldest son of Stanley David Garrick, a senior administrator and courtier to the Oba of Benin in the Kingdom of Benin, now in southwestern Nigeria. His grandfather was a Sierra Leone Creole catechist in Brass, Nigeria called J.D. Garrick.

George Garrick attended King's College, Lagos where he was Head Boy. He excelled academically and was also noted for his prowess at games including cricket, football, squash and athletics.

== National record ==
In 1938, Garrick enjoyed his finest moment when he established the Nigerian High Jump record with a clearance of 6 feet 3 and 1/2 inches during an athletic competition in Lagos. His record remained unbeaten for fourteen years and earned him national recognition. An exercise book illustration was created to honour his contribution to sports in general and High Jump in particular; one which millions of Nigerian students are very familiar with.

== Overseas success ==
The outbreak of World War II in 1939 ended Garrick's hopes of a medal at the British Empire Games which, ordinarily, would have been held in 1942. Nevertheless, he went on to register several athletic successes as a medical student at Glasgow University during the war years. In October 1946, he was awarded his Full Athletics Blue by the university; then, in 1947, he gained international honours representing Scotland against England and Ireland. Subsequently, he was appointed Captain of University Athletics for the 1948–49 season.

== Professional and personal life ==
Returning to Nigeria after qualifying as a medical doctor, George Garrick entered the Government Medical Service and served in several parts of the country before going into private practice. In 1953, he married Princess Comfort Odinchezo Amobi of Ogidi, a granddaughter of Igwe Amobi I of Ogidi.

Upon his father's death in 1958, Garrick's inheritance of the lands and seigniorial standing of the Siluko barony bestowed by the Oba of Benin led him to settle permanently in Benin City to continue his medical career.

Garrick and his wife had two children together. Kola (d. 2009) and Tayo, the reclusive younger boy who is the present holder of the lands and title.

== Final years ==
Dr. Garrick later served as vice president of the Bendel State Medical Association and on the state board of medical examiners, among others. In 1978, together with fellow practitioner Dr. N.O. Azinge, he was credited with important clinical observations regarding patient reactions to medication for the Stevens–Johnson syndrome.

Over time, as George Garrick's health declined, his interest in and patronage of sports in Nigeria at state and national level waned but he remained enthused by international athletics and cricket until the end of his life.

== Biographical sources ==
- Estate of George Adeniji Garrick of Siluko
- National Archives of Nigeria
- Estate of Princess Comfort Odinchezo Amobi
- Glasgow University
- National Library of Medicine
- Garrick Family Archives
- Niger Delta Congress
- The Royal House of Amobi
- National Center for Biotechnology Information
- King's College, Lagos
