= Ben McKinley =

Australian rules footballer (born 1987)

Personal information
- Full name: Benjamin Andrew McKinley
- Born: 4 March 1987 (age 39)
- Original team: Northern Knights (TAC Cup)
- Height: 185 cm (6 ft 1 in)
- Weight: 85 kg (187 lb)
- Positions: Full-forward, half-forward flank

Playing career^{1}
Years	Club	Games (Goals)
2006–2010	West Coast	46 (89)
2011	North Melbourne	2 (0)
Total		48 (89)
- ^{1} Playing statistics correct to the end of 2011.

Career highlights
- AFL Rising Star nominee 2008; West Coast leading goalkicker 2008; West Coast Rookie of the Year 2008; East Perth leading goal kicker 2007

Benjamin Andrew McKinley (born 4 March 1987) is an Australian rules footballer who previously played for the North Melbourne Football Club in the Australian Football League (AFL). He previously played for the West Coast Eagles.

== Early life ==
McKinley played all of his junior football (U10's - U17's) with the Yarrambat Junior Football Club. He attended Ivanhoe Grammar School where he played for the Old Ivanhoe Football Club. McKinley also played for the Northern Knights in the TAC Cup competition where he attracted the eye of talent scouts.

== AFL career ==
=== 2005–10: West Coast Eagles ===
McKinley was recruited by the West Coast as the number 29 draft pick in the 2005 AFL draft. McKinley has played predominantly as a forward for East Perth in the WAFL. He made his debut for the West Coast Eagles in Round 15 2007 against Port Adelaide. After kicking seven goals against West Perth in Round 2, he was a late inclusion into the West Coast team for the Round 3 Western Derby and kicked three goals. The following week, he kicked four of his team's five goals against Sydney. A five-goal effort in the Eagles' loss to Port Adelaide in Round 5 saw him nominated for the Rising Star award. A notable performance was the Essendon clash late in the season, with the Bombers needing a win to get to September, McKinley single-handedly destroyed Essendon with a 7-goal man of the match performance. . He finished the season as West Coast's leading goalkicker and was named Rookie of the Year at the Club Champion Awards .

=== 2011–2012: North Melbourne ===
During the 2010 AFL Trade Week, Ben McKinley requested a trade to North Melbourne Football Club. West Coast agreed to trade Ben McKinley to the North Melbourne Football Club in exchange for pick 86 in the 2010 AFL Draft.

== Delisting ==
Ben McKinley was delisted from North Melbourne at the end of the 2012 season after failing to play a senior match.
