= Gornick =

Gornick is a surname. Notable people with the surname include:

- Lisa Gornick (born 1970), British actress, screenwriter, film director and producer
- Vivian Gornick (born 1935), American critic, journalist, essayist, and memoirist

== See also ==
- Garnick
