= Garrick Ibbotson =

Australian rules footballer

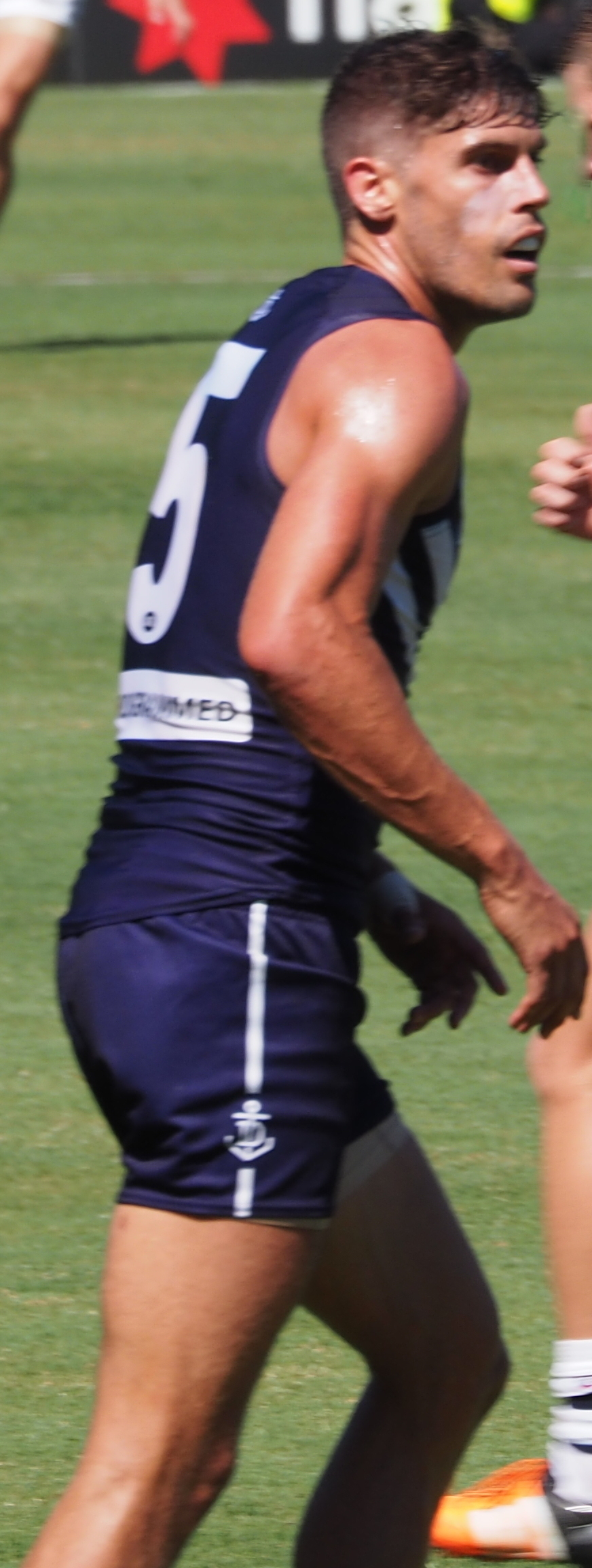
- Ibbotson in March 2016

Personal information
- Full name: Garrick Ibbotson
- Born: 15 March 1988 (age 38)
- Original team: East Fremantle (WAFL)
- Draft: No. 26, 2005 National Draft, Fremantle
- Height: 186 cm (6 ft 1 in)
- Weight: 81 kg (179 lb)
- Position: Defender

Playing career^{1}
Years	Club	Games (Goals)
2006–2017	Fremantle	177 (22)

International team honours^{2}
Years	Team	Games (Goals)
2010	Australia	2 (0)
- ^{1} Playing statistics correct to the end of 2017.^{2} Representative statistics correct as of 2010.

Career highlights
- 2008 AFL Rising Star nominee; Fremantle Life Member: 2015; WAFL premiership player: 2017

Garrick Ibbotson (born 15 March 1988) is a former professional Australian rules footballer who played for the Fremantle Football Club in the Australian Football League (AFL).

Ibbotson mainly played soccer as a junior and only converted to Australian rules football at the age of 13. He graduated from Corpus Christi College in 2005.

He was recruited as the number 26 draft pick in the 2005 AFL draft from East Fremantle.

== AFL career ==
Garrick made his debut for the Fremantle Football Club in round 11, 2007 against Richmond following some good form in the WAFL for East Fremantle. Considered one of the quickest players in the Fremantle squad, he re-signed for a further two years in May 2007, before he had even made his debut. He was nominated for the 2008 AFL Rising Star award after being Fremantle's best player in their Round 9 loss to Carlton at the Telstra Dome; he ultimately finished fifth for the award.

Heading into the final round of the 2017 season, Ibbotson announced his retirement after 12 seasons with Fremantle.

== Statistics ==
Statistics are correct to the end of the 2016 season

Legend
G	Goals	K	Kicks	D	Disposals	T	Tackles
B	Behinds	H	Handballs	M	Marks

Season	Team	No.	Games	Totals							Averages (per game)						
Season	Team	No.	Games	G	B	K	H	D	M	T	G	B	K	H	D	M	T
2007	Fremantle	35	1	1	0	4	3	7	3	1	1.0	0.0	4.0	3.0	7.0	3.0	1.0
2008	Fremantle	35	19	7	6	195	130	325	84	49	0.4	0.3	10.3	6.8	17.1	4.4	2.6
2009	Fremantle	5	22	3	6	234	172	406	110	45	0.1	0.3	10.6	7.8	18.4	5.0	2.0
2010	Fremantle	5	19	5	5	175	104	279	74	38	0.3	0.3	9.2	5.5	14.7	3.9	2.0
2011	Fremantle	5	18	3	1	197	111	308	79	44	0.2	0.1	10.9	6.2	17.1	4.4	2.4
2012	Fremantle	5	23	1	5	260	128	388	116	50	0.0	0.2	11.3	5.6	16.9	5.0	2.2
2013	Fremantle	5	13	1	1	191	91	282	106	32	0.1	0.1	14.7	7.0	21.7	8.2	2.5
2014	Fremantle	5	12	0	3	108	69	177	64	21	0.0	0.2	9.0	5.8	14.8	5.3	1.8
2015	Fremantle	5	24	1	1	287	152	439	160	30	0.0	0.0	12.0	6.3	18.3	6.7	1.2
2016	Fremantle	5	16	0	1	173	80	253	94	28	0.0	0.1	10.8	5.0	15.8	5.9	1.8
Career			167	22	29	1824	1040	2864	890	338	0.1	0.2	10.9	6.2	17.1	5.3	2.0
