= Mitch Morton =

Australian rules footballer (born 1987)

Personal information
- Full name: Mitchell Robert Morton
- Born: 28 January 1987 (age 39); Western Australia
- Original team: Claremont (WAFL)
- Draft: 44th (Father-Son) overall, 2004; West Coast
- Height: 186 cm (6 ft 1 in)
- Weight: 86 kg (190 lb)
- Position: Half forward/full forward

Playing career^{1}
Years	Club	Games (Goals)
2005–2007	West Coast	12 (11)
2008–2011	Richmond	59 (94)
2012–2013	Sydney	12 (11)
Total		83 (116)
- ^{1} Playing statistics correct to the end of 2013.

Career highlights
- Sydney premiership player 2012; Michael Roach Medal 2009

Mitchell Morton (born 28 January 1987) is a former Australian rules football player who played for the West Coast Eagles, Richmond Football Club and Sydney Swans in the Australian Football League (AFL).

== Career ==
Morton was initially drafted by the West Coast Eagles under the father–son rule as he is the son of Noel Morton, who played 171 WAFL games for Claremont.

At the end of the 2007 season, West Coast traded Morton to Richmond for the number 35 draft pick in the 2007 AFL draft. Morton was prominent and vital member of the Tigers squad, winning the Michael Roach medal as the leading goal kicker for the club this season (2009) with 41 goals. Morton fell out of favour in 2011, only managing nine games. He was subsequently traded to the Sydney Swans on 17 October 2011 for draft pick #79.

In his first year on the Swans' list, he played the vast majority of the year in the reserves side in the NEAFL. Despite kicking bags of goals on a regular basis, Morton was denied his debut in the seniors side until very late in the season. Halfway through the year he was told that in order to have any chance of winning a spot in the seniors side he had to improve specific parts of his game that had nothing to do with his goal kicking. Having improved sufficiently in those areas along with an injury to Ben McGlynn, Morton was able to secure a spot in the Sydney side for the finals. He kicked two goals in the qualifying final against Adelaide and another two in the 2012 AFL Grand Final against Hawthorn, justifying the gamble the Swans took on him.

Towards the end of the 2013 AFL season, Morton announced his retirement, to pursue a career in the corporate sector.

== Personal life ==
A former student of Hale School in Perth, Mitch is the brother of Jarryd, who played for Hawthorn, and Cale, who has played for Melbourne and West Coast.

== Statistics ==
Statistics are correct as end of round 22, 2014

Legend
G	Goals	K	Kicks	D	Disposals	T	Tackles
B	Behinds	H	Handballs	M	Marks

Season	Team	No.	Games	Totals							Averages (per game)						
Season	Team	No.	Games	G	B	K	H	D	M	T	G	B	K	H	D	M	T
2005	West Coast	12	3	1	1	13	7	20	9	0	0.3	0.3	4.3	2.3	6.7	3.0	0.0
2006	West Coast	12	1	1	0	7	4	11	4	3	1.0	0.0	7.0	4.0	11.0	4.0	3.0
2007	West Coast	12	8	9	1	64	42	106	37	11	1.1	0.1	8.0	5.3	13.3	4.6	1.4
2008	Richmond	20	17	35	16	131	60	191	80	36	2.1	0.9	7.7	3.5	11.2	4.7	2.1
2009	Richmond	20	21	41	26	188	123	311	119	56	2.0	1.2	9.0	5.9	14.8	5.7	2.7
2010	Richmond	20	12	12	12	113	93	206	52	39	1.0	1.0	9.4	7.8	17.2	4.3	3.3
2011	Richmond	20	9	6	1	63	49	112	23	26	0.7	0.1	7.0	5.4	12.4	2.6	2.9
2012	Sydney	10	5	5	2	23	18	42	13	15	1.0	0.4	4.6	3.8	8.4	2.6	3.0
2013	Sydney	10	7	6	5	36	33	69	14	20	0.9	0.7	5.1	4.7	9.9	2.0	2.9
Career			83	116	64	638	430	1068	351	206	1.4	0.8	7.7	5.2	12.9	4.2	2.5
