= Garrioch =

Garrioch is a surname. Notable people with the surname include:

- Alfred Garrioch (1848–1934), Canadian Anglican priest and author
- Henry Garrioch (1916–2008), Acting Governor-General of Mauritius
- William Garrioch (1828–1916), Canadian farmer and politician
