= Stanley Garrick =

Stanley David Garrick, Egaibu of Siluko (8 June 1888 – 12 May 1958) was a senior administrator and courtier to Oba Akenzua II, the 37th Oba of the Kingdom of Benin, now in southern Nigeria. His father was a Sierra Leone Creole catechist called J. D. Garrick.

== Professional life ==
Garrick was appointed to run Benin's postal service in 1923 after the Southern Nigerian Government had become responsible for managing the protectorate's postal system. He subsequently oversaw the growth of Benin's importance as a postal hub at a time when its delta location made water transport the preferred means of serving a region that lacked adequate roads.

== Honour ==
In recognition of his services to Benin, baronial lands in the district of Siluko were settled on Garrick in 1943 as a personal gift of the Benin monarch, HRH Oba Akenzua II.

== Private life ==
Garrick and his wife, Comfort Ramotu, had three sons and two daughters in a marriage lasting over four decades.

== Last years ==
In later years, Garrick devoted his time to his farms and rubber plantations. However, the loss of his sight towards the end of his life curtailed the enjoyment of his estates. On his death in 1958, the Siluko barony passed to his eldest son and heir, George A. Garrick - better known as the holder of Nigeria's High Jump record between 1938 and 1953.

== Descendants ==
Among Garrick's descendants are several grandchildren who have also dedicated themselves to public service. They include His Lordship Stanley Shenko Alagoa, retired Justice of the Nigerian Supreme Court and Officer of the Order of the Federal Republic (OFR); His Excellency Kayode Ralph Garrick, Grand Cross of the Order of Rio Branco, former Ambassador Extraordinary and Plenipotentiary of Nigeria to Brazil; Dr. Chike Gwam, international practitioner of paediatric and internal medicine; Dr. (Mrs.) Abigail Funlayo Afiesimama (née Alagoa), a linguist and university lecturer and Fred Abiola Garrick, a seasoned Intellectual property and trademark lawyer.

== Memorial ==
The Garrick modern (later turned memorial)school was established by Stanley David Garrick and its ethos is based on his spirit of civic duty.

== Sources ==
- Nigeria Direct
- Garrick family
- Palace of Benin
- National Archives of Nigeria
- Garrick Memorial School
- Vanguard newspaper archives
- Nigerian Bar Association
- John Harris Library of the University of Benin
