= Jarryd Morton =

Australian rules footballer

Personal information
- Full name: Jarryd Noel Morton
- Born: 5 October 1988 (age 38); Western Australia
- Original team: Claremont
- Draft: No. 33, 2006 national draft
- Debut: Round 9, 2008, Hawthorn vs. Melbourne, at Melbourne Cricket Ground
- Height: 191 cm (6 ft 3 in)
- Weight: 87 kg (192 lb)
- Position: Midfielder/Forward

Playing career^{1}
Years	Club	Games (Goals)
2007–2011	Hawthorn	22 (12)
- ^{1} Playing statistics correct to the end of 2011.

Jarryd Morton (born 5 October 1988) is an Australian rules footballer formerly in the Australian Football League (AFL) with the Hawthorn Football Club.

Morton played across the half-back flanks and wore the number 19 guernsey. His two brothers also played in the AFL. Cale played for Melbourne and West Coast and Mitch played for West Coast, Richmond and Sydney.

Morton picked up a NAB Rising Star nomination in Round 13 of the 2008 season.

== Statistics ==
Legend
G	Goals	K	Kicks	D	Disposals	T	Tackles
B	Behinds	H	Handballs	M	Marks

Season	Team	No.	Games	Totals							Averages (per game)							Votes
Season	Team	No.	Games	G	B	K	H	D	M	T	G	B	K	H	D	M	T	Votes
2007	Hawthorn	35	0	—	—	—	—	—	—	—	—	—	—	—	—	—	—	0
2008	Hawthorn	35	8	0	1	66	85	151	41	11	0.0	0.1	8.3	10.6	18.9	5.1	1.4	0
2009	Hawthorn	35	9	5	6	86	73	159	51	21	0.6	0.7	9.6	8.1	17.7	5.7	2.3	0
2010	Hawthorn	19	5	7	2	33	33	66	25	9	1.4	0.4	6.6	6.6	13.2	5.0	1.8	0
2011	Hawthorn	19	0	—	—	—	—	—	—	—	—	—	—	—	—	—	—	0
Career			22	12	9	185	191	376	117	41	0.5	0.4	8.4	8.7	17.1	5.3	1.9	0

== Honours and achievements ==
Individual

- AFL Rising Star nominee: 2008
