= Gavin Urquhart =

Australian rules football player

Personal information
- Full name: Gavin Urquhart
- Born: 18 May 1988 (age 38); Mackay, Queensland
- Original team: Morningside (QAFL)
- Draft: No. 21, 2006 National Draft, Kangaroos; No. 77, 2012 Pre-season Draft, North Melbourne
- Height: 181 cm (5 ft 11 in)
- Weight: 82 kg (181 lb)
- Position: Defender

Playing career^{1}
Years	Club	Games (Goals)
2008–2012	North Melbourne	41 (3)
- ^{1} Playing statistics correct to the end of 2011.

Career highlights
- 2008 AFL Rising Star nominee

Gavin Urquhart (born 18 May 1988) is an Australian rules football player, who last played for North Melbourne Football Club.

Uruquart was born in Mackay, Queensland and raised in Rockhampton where he played his junior football with the Glenmore Bulls. Touted as an AFL prospect playing for Queensland in the U18 national championships, he moved to Brisbane and joined QAFL club Morningside.

Urquhart was the 21st pick in the 2006 AFL draft, and made his senior debut on 31 May 2008, in round 10. Urquhart received a Rising Star nomination after his round 18 performance against Brisbane, when he had 22 possessions. Urquhart signed a two-year deal with North Melbourne in August 2008.

The 2010 season was a poor one for Urquhart, as he struggled to overcome niggling injuries, and he could only manage eight senior games. During trade week, rumours surfaced that North Melbourne were going to trade Urquart, but Kangaroos coach Brad Scott dismissed the rumours only days later, declaring that "he's a required player".

At the end of the 2012 season, Urquhart was delisted by the Kangaroos. Subsequently, in 2014 he signed with Essendon District Football League team Airport West.
