= Cale Morton =

Australian rules footballer (born 1990)

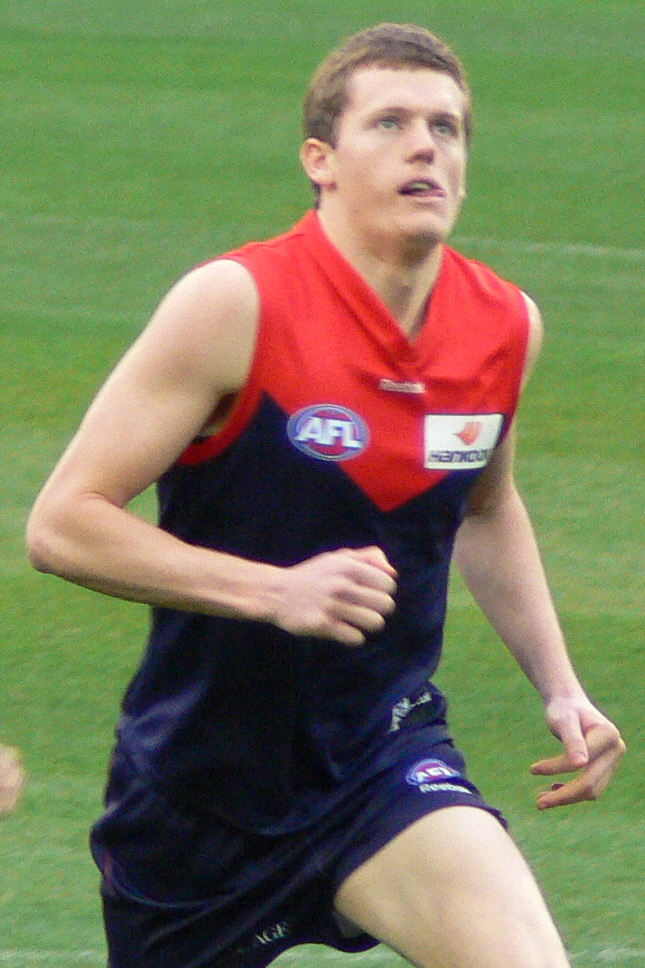
- Morton with Melbourne in 2009

Personal information
- Full name: Cale Edward Morton
- Born: 18 January 1990 (age 36); Lake Grace
- Original team: Claremont
- Draft: 4th, 2007; Melbourne
- Height: 191 cm (6 ft 3 in)
- Weight: 78 kg (172 lb)
- Position: Midfielder

Playing career^{1}
Years	Club	Games (Goals)
2008–2012	Melbourne	73 (33)
2013	West Coast	3 (1)
Total		76 (34)
- ^{1} Playing statistics correct to the end of 2013.

Career highlights
- Larke Medal 2007; AFL Rising Star Nominee: 2008; Harold Ball Memorial Trophy: 2008

Cale Morton (born 18 January 1990) is a former Australian rules football player, recruited at pick 4 in the 2007 AFL draft by the Melbourne Football Club.

Morton was a midfield/forward with a penetrating and accurate kick as well as being a good winner of the ball, both in the air and at ground level. He was ranked first at the 2007 Draft Camp for aerobic capability, recording a 15.2 beep test result.

Cale Morton attended Hale School in Western Australia and was a member of both the 1st XVIII football side and 1st XI cricket side, captaining the 1st XVIII in his final year at school.

His two brothers also played in the AFL. Mitch played for Richmond Football Club and the Sydney Swans and Jarryd played for the Hawthorn Football Club.

Cale also won the Larke Medal in 2007 for being the best player at the 2007 Under 18's National Championships.

== Melbourne Demons ==
In 2008 he won the best first year player award at the Melbourne Football Club. Cale was nominated for the NAB AFL Rising Star in Round 20, 2008.

== West Coast Eagles ==
In the 2012 trade period, he was traded to the West Coast Eagles in exchange for pick 88. Morton loomed as one of the trade bargains, lured back to Western Australia after five seasons and 73 games with Melbourne where he twice finished in the top 10 of the Demons' best and fairest count.

Tall and athletic at 192 cm and 88 kg, Morton played a variety of roles while at Melbourne, but spent most of his time through the midfield. The Eagles traded selection 88, secured from Port Adelaide after trading Lewis Stevenson to the Power, to land Morton.

The move didn't reinvigorate his career however, and he was delisted at the end of the 2013 season.
