= 2004 AFL Under 18 Championships =

Youth Australian rules football competition

- Teams: 8

Division 1
- Teams: 4
- Champions: Vic Metro
- Larke Medal: Jesse Smith

Division 2
- Teams: 4
- Champions: Queensland
- Hunter Harrison Medal: Richard Tambling

The 2004 National AFL Under 18 Championships was the ninth edition of the AFL Under 18 Championships. Eight teams competed in the championships: Vic Metro, Vic Country, South Australia and Western Australia in Division 1, and New South Wales/Australian Capital Territory (NSW/ACT), Northern Territory, Queensland and Tasmania in Division 2. The competition was played over three rounds across two divisions. Vic Metro and the Northern Territory were the Division 1 and Division 2 champions, respectively. The Michael Larke Medal (for the best player in Division 1) was awarded to Victoria Metro's Jesse W. Smith, and the Hunter Harrison Medal (for the best player in Division 2) was won by the Northern Territory's Richard Tambling.

== Results ==
=== Division 1 ===
	Round 1
Sunday, 4 July	Vic Metro 19.6 (120)	def.	Vic Country 8.9 (57)	Melbourne Cricket Ground	Report
Sunday, 4 July	Western Australia 8.7 (55)	def. by	South Australia 15.6 (96)	Melbourne Cricket Ground	Report

	Round 2
Wednesday, 7 July	Vic Country 9.8 (62)	def.	South Australia 7.9 (51)	Skilled Stadium	Report
Wednesday, 7 July	Vic Metro -	def. by	Western Australia -	Skilled Stadium	-
Western Australia defeated Vic Metro by two points.

	Round 3
Sunday, 11 July	Vic Metro 14.7 (91)	def.	South Australia 12.13 (85)	Melbourne Cricket Ground	Report
Sunday, 11 July	Vic Country 12.14 (86)	def.	Western Australia 5.10 (40)	Optus Oval	Report

Division 1 Ladder

TEAM	WON	LOST
Vic Metro	2	1
Vic Country	2	1
South Australia	1	2
Western Australia	1	2

=== Division 2 ===
	Round 1
Saturday, 3 July	NSW/ACT 10.13 (73)	def.	Northern Territory 10.7 (67)	TEAC Oval	Report
Saturday, 3 July	Tasmania 14.7 (91)	def.	Queensland 8.10 (58)	TEAC Oval	Report

	Round 2
Tuesday, 6 July	Queensland -	def. by	NSW/ACT -	Optus Oval	-
Tuesday, 6 July	Tasmania -	def. by	Northern Territory -	Optus Oval	-
NSW/ACT defeated Queensland by 4 points while NT beat Tasmania.

	Round 3
Saturday, 10 July	Northern Territory -	def.	Queensland -	Optus Oval	-
Saturday, 10 July	Tasmania -	def.	NSW/ACT -	Optus Oval	-
NT defeated Queensland by 3 goals while Tasmania defeated NSW/ACT by 11 points.

Division 2 Ladder

TEAM	WON	LOST
Northern Territory	2	1
Tasmania	2	1
NSW/ACT	2	1
Queensland	0	3

== Under 18 All-Australian team ==
The 2004 Under 18 All-Australian team was named on 11 July 2004:

New South Wales/Australian Capital Territory: Edward Clarke
Northern Territory: Richard Tambling
Queensland: Will Hamill
South Australia: Ben Eckermann, Ryan Griffen, Heath Grundy, Scott McMahon, Angus Monfries, Cameron Wood
Tasmania: Justin Sherman
Victoria Country: Brett Deledio, Marcus Drum, Ruory Kirkby, Jordan Lewis, Dean Polo
Victoria Metropolitan: Jayden Attard, Jarred Moore, Ben Sharp, Jesse W. Smith
Western Australia: Mark Le Cras, Mitchell Morton, Alan Toovey
