= 2001 AFL Under 18 Championships =

Youth Australian rules football competition

- Teams: 8

Division 1
- Teams: 4
- Champions: Vic Metro
- Larke Medal: Sam Power; Steven Armstrong

Division 2
- Teams: 4
- Champions: Tasmania
- Hunter Harrison Medal: Tom Davidson

The 2001 National AFL Under 18 Championships was the sixth edition of the AFL Under 18 Championships. Eight teams competed in the championships: Vic Metro, Vic Country, South Australia and Western Australia in Division 1, and New South Wales/Australian Capital Territory (NSW/ACT), Northern Territory, Queensland and Tasmania in Division 2. The competition was played over three rounds across two divisions. Vic Metro and Tasmania were the Division 1 and Division 2 champions, respectively. The Michael Larke Medal (for the best player in Division 1) was awarded jointly to Sam Power (Vic Metro) and Steven Armstrong (Western Australia), while the Hunter Harrison Medal (for the best player in Division 2) was won by Tasmania's Tom Davidson.

== Under 18 All-Australian team ==
The 2001 Under 18 All-Australian team was named on 9 July 2001:

NSW/ACT

- Lewis Roberts-Thomson – NSW/ACT Rams
- Daniel Elstone – Bendigo Pioneers

Northern Territory

- Xavier Clarke – St Marys

Queensland

- David Hale – Broadbeach

South Australia

- Mark Jamar – North Adelaide

Tasmania

- Nathan Street – Glenorchy
- Tom Davidson – Geelong Falcons
- Barry Brooks – Tassie Mariners

Victoria Country

- Ashley Watson – Bendigo Pioneers
- Jimmy Bartel – Geelong Falcons
- Mark McGough – Murray Bushrangers
- Steve Johnson – Murray Bushrangers

Victoria Metropolitan

- Andrew Carrazzo – Oakleigh Chargers
- Sam Power – Oakleigh Chargers
- Luke Ball – Sandringham Dragons
- David Rodan – Calder Cannons
- Charlie Gardiner – Sandringham Dragons
- Brent Reilly – Calder Cannons
- Ben Finnin – Northern Knights

Western Australia

- Craig Glancy – East Perth
- Steven Armstrong – Perth
- Quinten Lynch – West Perth

Coach

David Dickson (Vic Metro)

Assistant coach

Martin King (Tasmania)
