= AFL National Championships =

National Australian rules football championships for players aged 18 years or younger

- Current season, competition or edition: 2026 AFL National Championships
- Formerly: Teal Cup (1953–1976), Australian Football National Championships (1977–1995), AFL Under-18 National Championship (1996-2020), AFL U19 National Championships (2021)
- Sport: Australian rules football
- First season: 1953
- Administrator: Australian Football League
- No. of teams: 8
- Most recent champion: Vic Metro (2026)
- Most titles: (D1) Vic Metro (19) (D2) Tasmania (8)
- Broadcaster: Fox Footy
- Sponsor: National Australia Bank
- Related competitions: AFL Women's Under 18 Championships

The AFL National Championships is an annual Australian national underage Australian rules football tournament run by the Australian Football League (AFL). Along with the Talent League, it forms one of the main junior pathways to the fully professional national club competition. Since 2017 it has been run as two competitions - an AFL National Under-18 Boys for the AFL and AFL National Championships – U18 Girls for the AFL Women's. The current format gives national draft recruiters a chance to witness the most talented underage players from around the country without requiring them to relocate to Melbourne and play with a Talent League club.

Beginning as the Teal Cup in Brisbane in 1953 as a junior representative competition between the Australian states of Queensland and New South Wales it expanded nationally in 1976.

The state representative division is contested in a hybrid format. The best Under-19 players from AFL club junior academies combine to form an 'Allies' team to contest Division 1 against representative teams from 3 of the traditional powerhouse football states of Victoria, South Australia and Western Australia. With a lack of interstate representative football at senior level since 1999, the National Championships were one of the few opportunities for players to play for their state or territory. With the shift towards academies, few of the states and territories are represented, though the Tasmania Devils Academy and Northern Territory Academy field standalone Under 16 boys sides and Queensland fields girls sides in all age levels. State and club representatives typically share the senior team's guernsey (with the exception of Victorian teams, which play in variations of the state team guernsey—Vic Metro has a light blue Big V insignia, while Vic Country plays in a reverse white with navy Big V).

== History ==
Before the current competition the main underage competition was schools based. The Australian Schoolboys Championship (also known as the Australian Schoolboys National Football Carnival or ASSNFC) run by the Australian Schools Sports Council (ASSC) ran from 1923. By 1925 there were teams in every Australian state. However, in of Queensland and New South Wales as other football codes, particularly rugby league and rugby union took increasing hold in public and private schools respectively most juniors there had no other choice but to play for a club. New South Wales in particular for many years could send strong enough Public Schools Amateur Athletic Association sides without including players from the Australian Capital Territory. While Queensland had sufficient numbers of schoolboys playing the game to regularly send sides, it experienced no success and league administrators and local schoolteachers there struggled for recognition as Queensland was increasingly seen as rugby territory.

The Australian National Football Council saw the need for a competition to fill this gap and Bruce Andrew, its Queensland based field officer is credited directly with its establishment securing funding, organising team travel and standardising rules. A trophy donated by the Teal family of Queensland and a new competition to be known as the Teal Cup would allow junior representatives from the two states to challenge each other. The first match was held in Brisbane, Queensland in 1953. From 1963 it became an annual contest.

The Australian Capital Territory was the first other side to enter in 1973. With the addition of teams from each Australian state and mainland territory in 1976, the tournament was rebranded as the National Championships and rotated between host cities. The championships were split into two divisions with the strongest states including Victoria (later split into two sides: Vic Metro and Vic Country) comprising Division 1. Papua New Guinea was the first other country to field a team in 1979.

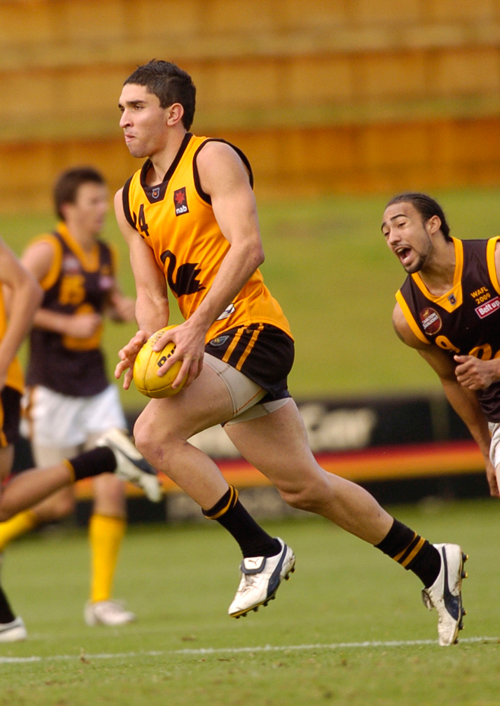
Under-18 All-Australian and WA's Most Valuable Player award winner Anthony Morabito from the 2009 championship.

In the absence of a national league, and less regular senior competition, it grew into one of the most important competitions in the country. Early on it was an Under-17 competition, however the age limit has been progressively increased and separate junior championships added for Under-15 level (commencing as the Shell Cup, now the AFL National Development Championships) from the 1970s onwards. It was a major talent pathway for underage players outside Victoria to the VFL.

As part of the AFL Commission's role as national governing body, the Victorian TAC Cup competition was restructured in 1992 to become the primary pathway to the AFL. As a result, representative development sides from NSW/ACT and Tasmania for a time have played in that competition instead.

In 1996 the AFL Commission and the Australian Schools Sports Council (ASSC) formed the Under-16 National Championships as a joint initiative, forming a national junior competition. As part of this restructuring, the AFL lifted the Teal Cup age limit from under 17 to under 18 to form a pathway transition from national junior to senior development. It also resulted in national recognition by the Australian Institute of Sport (AIS) similar to that achieved by Football Federation Australia with the All-Australian underage teams as the AFL Academy touring Ireland to play International Rules football.

In later years, especially with the discontinuation of the AIS elite high-performance partnership and accelerated growth of the sport outside Victoria, the National Championships regained status as a primary AFL recruitment pathway.

In 2017 the AFL again restructured the competition, replacing division 2 with an Under-19 Academy Series. Instead of state representative teams, this new division would feature squads formed from the 4 Queensland and NSW AFL clubs' academies in addition to Northern Territory and Tasmania state teams.

In 2021 the entire competition was changed to under-19s (the competition has previously operated under-17s and under-18s competitions).

== Winners and awards ==
=== Individual awards ===
The Larke Medal is awarded to the best player in Division 1 of the competition. It is named in honour of a junior footballer, Michael Larke, who was killed in a bus crash while attending a trial match for New South Wales. The Hunter Harrison Medal is awarded to the best player in Division 2 and is named in honour of a former president and life member of the Northern Territory Football League, Hunter Harrison, who played a major role in the development of the AFL Youth Championships. Each tournament, an underage All-Australian team is named; an MVP is also named for each team.

=== Past winners ===
Year	Division 1 Premiers	Larke Medal	Division 2 Premiers	Hunter Harrison Medal	Host/s
1953	Queensland				Brisbane, Queensland
1954–1962	Not contested				
1963	Queensland				
1964	Queensland				
1965	Queensland				
1966	Queensland				
1967	Queensland				
1968	Queensland				
1969	Queensland				Brisbane, Queensland
1970	Queensland				
1971	Queensland				
1972	Queensland				
1973	Queensland				Sydney, New South Wales
1974	New South Wales				Canberra, Australian Capital Territory
1975	New South Wales				Brisbane, Queensland
1976	(Victoria (state)) Victoria	Mick Woods (Vic)			Wagga Wagga, New South Wales
1977	(Victoria (state)) Victoria	Rodney Watts (Vic)			Melbourne, Victoria
1978	South Australia	Mark Weideman (SA)			Brisbane, Queensland
1979	South Australia	Grant Campbell (WA)			Hobart, Tasmania
1980	South Australia	Darryl Murphy (ACT)			Perth, Western Australia
1981	(Victoria (state)) Victoria	Paul Salmon (Vic)			Melbourne, Victoria
1982	(Victoria (state)) Victoria	Michael Phyland (NSW)			Brisbane, Queensland
1983	(Victoria (state)) Victoria	Greg Anderson (SA)			Darwin, Northern Territory
1984	(Victoria (state)) Victoria	David Condon (NSW)			Sydney, New South Wales
1985	Western Australia	Jason Kerr (NSW)			Perth, Western Australia
1986	(Victoria (state)) Victoria	Stephen Lawrence (Qld)			Adelaide, South Australia
1987	(Victoria (state)) Victoria	Steven Kolyniuk (Vic)			Hobart, Tasmania
1988	(Victoria (state)) Victoria	Robbie Wright (NSW)			Canberra, Australian Capital Territory
1989	(Victoria (state)) Vic Country	Ray Windsor (Qld)			Melbourne, Victoria
1990	(Victoria (state)) Vic Metro	Paul Williams (Tas)			Brisbane, Queensland
1991	South Australia	Robert Neill (ACT)			Darwin, Northern Territory
1992	(Victoria (state)) Vic Metro	Daniel Southern (WA)	(Victoria (state)) Vic Country	Michael Voss (Qld)	Melbourne, Victoria
1993	(Victoria (state)) Vic Metro	Shaun McManus (WA)	New South Wales	Mark Ryan (NT)	Adelaide, South Australia
1994	(Victoria (state)) Vic Metro	Daniel Harford (Vic M.)	(Victoria (state)) Vic Country	Michael Martin (Tas)	Perth, Western Australia
1995	South Australia	Luke Godden (Vic M.); Ben Setchell (Vic C.)	Western Australia	Steven Koops (NT)	Riverina District
1996	(Victoria (state)) Vic Metro	Pat Steinfort (Vic M.)	Tasmania	Matthew Bernes (Tas)	Melbourne, Victoria
1997	(Victoria (state)) Vic Metro	Tim Finocchiaro (Vic M.)	Queensland	Fred Campbell (NT)	Melbourne, Victoria
1998	(Victoria (state)) Vic Metro	Garth Taylor (WA)	(New South Wales) / (Australian Capital Territory) NSW/ACT	Shane Young (Qld); Derek Murray (NSW/ACT)	Adelaide, South Australia
1999	Western Australia	Paul Hasleby (WA)	Queensland	Brad Green (Tas)	Brisbane, Queensland
2000	(Victoria (state)) Vic Country	Kayne Pettifer (Vic C.)	(New South Wales) / (Australian Capital Territory) NSW/ACT	Ian Callinan (Tas)	Melbourne, Victoria
2001	(Victoria (state)) Vic Metro	Sam Power (Vic M.); Steven Armstrong (WA)	Tasmania	Tom Davidson (Tas)	Melbourne, Victoria
2002	(Victoria (state)) Vic Metro	Byron Schammer (SA)	(New South Wales) / (Australian Capital Territory) NSW/ACT	Anthony Corrie (NT)	Melbourne, Victoria
2003	(Victoria (state)) Vic Country	Kepler Bradley (WA)	(New South Wales) / (Australian Capital Territory) NSW/ACT	Jake Furfaro (Qld)	Melbourne, Victoria
2004	(Victoria (state)) Vic Metro	Jesse Smith (Vic M.)	Northern Territory	Richard Tambling (NT)	Melbourne, Victoria
2005	(Victoria (state)) Vic Metro	Marc Murphy (Vic M.)	Tasmania	Grant Birchall (Tas)	Melbourne, Victoria
2006	(Victoria (state)) Vic Metro	Tom Hawkins (Vic M.)	Queensland	Ricky Petterd (Qld)	Melbourne, Victoria
2007	Western Australia	Cale Morton (WA)	(New South Wales) / (Australian Capital Territory) NSW/ACT	Craig Bird (NSW/ACT)	VIC, WA, SA, NSW
2008	(Victoria (state)) Vic Metro	Jack Watts (Vic M.)	Tasmania	Mitch Robinson (Tas)	VIC, WA, SA, TAS
2009	Western Australia	David Swallow (WA); Andrew Hooper (Vic C.)	(New South Wales) / (Australian Capital Territory) NSW/ACT	Dylan McNeil (NSW/ACT)	All states
2010	(Victoria (state)) Vic Country	Harley Bennell (WA)	Tasmania	Sam Darley (Tas)	All states
2011	(Victoria (state)) Vic Metro	Stephen Coniglio (WA)	Tasmania	John McKenzie (Tas)	All states
2012	(Victoria (state)) Vic Metro	Lachie Whitfield (Vic C.)	Northern Territory	Jake Neade (NT)	All states
2013	South Australia	Dom Sheed (WA)	Tasmania	Liam Dawson (Qld); Kade Kolodjashnij (Tas); Toby Nankervis (Tas)	All states
2014	South Australia	Christian Petracca (Vic M.)	(New South Wales) / (Australian Capital Territory) NSW/ACT	Isaac Heeney (NSW/ACT)	VIC, WA, SA, NSW
2015	(Victoria (state)) Vic Country	Josh Schache (Vic C.)	Queensland	Ben Keays (Qld)	VIC, WA, SA, QLD
2016	(Victoria (state)) Vic Metro	Jack Graham (SA)	(New South Wales) / (Australian Capital Territory) NSW/ACT	Jack Bowes (Qld)	All states
2017	(Victoria (state)) Vic Metro	Oscar Allen (WA)	(Replaced by Academy Series)	Nick Blakey (Syd A.)	VIC, WA, SA, NSW
2018	South Australia	Sam Walsh (Vic C.)	(Replaced by Academy Series)	Tarryn Thomas (Tas)	VIC, SA, QLD
2019	Western Australia	Deven Robertson (WA)	(Replaced by Academy Series)	Connor Budarick (GC A.)	VIC, NSW, SA
2020	Cancelled due to COVID-19 pandemic				
2021	Cancelled due to COVID-19 pandemic				
2022	(Victoria (state)) Vic Metro	Will Ashcroft (Vic M.)	(Replaced by Academy Series)	Jaspa Fletcher (Bris A.)	All mainland states
2023	Allies	Ryley Sanders (Allies)	(Replaced by Academy Series)	Ethan Read (GC A.)	VIC, WA, SA, QLD
2024	(Victoria (state)) Vic Metro	Harvey Langford (Vic Metro), Leo Lombard (Allies)	(Replaced by Academy Series)	Zeke Uwland (GC A.)	All mainland states
2025	South Australia	Dyson Sharp (SA)	(Replaced by Academy Series)	Taj Murray (NT)	All mainland states

=== Recent Placings (2002–Present) ===
==== Division 1 ====
Season	Winner	Second	Third	Fourth
2002	Victoria Metro	Victoria Country	South Australia	Western Australia
2003	Victoria Country	Victoria Metro	South Australia	Western Australia
2004	Victoria Metro	Victoria Country	South Australia	Western Australia
2005	Victoria Metro	Western Australia	South Australia	Victoria Country
2006	Victoria Metro	Victoria Country	South Australia	Western Australia
2007	Western Australia	Victoria Metro	South Australia	Victoria Country

Season	Winner	Second	Third	Fourth	Fifth	Sixth	Seventh	Eighth
2008	Victoria Metro	Western Australia	South Australia	Victoria Country	NSW/ACT	Tasmania		
2009	Western Australia	South Australia	Victoria Country	NSW/ACT	Victoria Metro	Northern Territory	Tasmania	Queensland

Season	Winner	Second	Third	Fourth
2010	Victoria Country	South Australia	Victoria Metro	Western Australia
2011	Victoria Metro	South Australia	Victoria Country	Western Australia
2012	Victoria Metro	South Australia	Western Australia	Victoria Country
2013	South Australia	Victoria Metro	Western Australia	Victoria Country
2014	South Australia	Victoria Metro	Victoria Country	Western Australia
2015	Victoria Country	South Australia	Victoria Metro	Western Australia

Season	Winner	Second	Third	Fourth	Fifth
2016	Victoria Metro	South Australia	Western Australia	Allies	Victoria Country
2017	Victoria Metro	Western Australia	South Australia	Victoria Country	Allies
2018	South Australia	Victoria Metro	Western Australia	Allies	Victoria Country
2019	Western Australia	Victoria Country	South Australia	Allies	Victoria Metro
2020	Not contested due to the COVID-19 pandemic				
2021	Not contested due to the COVID-19 pandemic				
2022	Victoria Metro	Victoria Country	South Australia	Western Australia	Allies
2023	Allies	Victoria Metro	Victoria Country	South Australia	Western Australia
2024	Victoria Metro	Victoria Country	Western Australia	Allies	South Australia
2025	South Australia	Victoria Country	Victoria Metro	Allies	Western Australia
2026	Victoria Metro	South Australia	Western Australia	Victoria Country	Allies

==== Division 2 (1992–2016) ====
Season	Winner	Second	Third	Fourth
2002	NSW/ACT	Queensland	Northern Territory	Tasmania
2003	NSW/ACT	Queensland	Northern Territory	Tasmania
2004	Northern Territory	Tasmania	NSW/ACT	Queensland
2005	Tasmania	Queensland	NSW/ACT	Northern Territory
2006	Queensland	Northern Territory	Tasmania	NSW/ACT
2007	NSW/ACT	Northern Territory	Tasmania	Queensland
2008	Tasmania	NSW/ACT	Northern Territory	Queensland
2009	Teams moved to Division 1 for the 2009 Championships			
2010	Tasmania	NSW/ACT	Northern Territory	Queensland
2011	Tasmania	NSW/ACT	Queensland	Northern Territory
2012	Northern Territory	Queensland	Tasmania	NSW/ACT
2013	Tasmania	NSW/ACT	Queensland	Northern Territory
2014	NSW/ACT	Queensland	Tasmania	Northern Territory
2015	Queensland	Tasmania	NSW/ACT	Northern Territory
2016	NSW/ACT	Northern Territory	Queensland	Tasmania

==== Academy Series (2017–2018) ====
Season	Winner	Second	Third	Fourth	Fifth	Sixth
2017	Sydney Swans	Gold Coast Suns	GWS Giants	Tasmania	Brisbane Lions	Northern Territory
2018	Sydney Swans	Brisbane Lions	Tasmania	Northern Territory	Gold Coast Suns	GWS Giants

==== Northern Academy Series (2019–present) ====
Season	Winner	Second	Third	Fourth	Fifth
2019	Gold Coast Suns	Sydney Swans	GWS Giants	Brisbane Lions	Northern Territory
2020	Not contested due to the COVID-19 pandemic				
2021	Not contested due to the COVID-19 pandemic				
2022	GWS Giants	Brisbane Lions	Gold Coast Suns	Sydney Swans	Northern Territory
2023	Sydney Swans	Gold Coast Suns	Brisbane Lions	GWS Giants	Northern Territory
2024	Sydney Swans	Brisbane Lions	Gold Coast Suns	GWS Giants	Northern Territory
2025	Gold Coast Suns	Brisbane Lions	GWS Giants	Sydney Swans	Northern Territory
2026	Sydney Swans	Brisbane Lions	GWS Giants	Gold Coast Suns	Northern Territory

== Participating teams ==
=== Current ===
==== Division 1 ====
- (Australia) Allies (Australian Capital Territory,
  New South Wales,
  Northern Territory,
  Queensland,
  Tasmania) (2016–)
- (Victoria (state)) Victoria Country (Victoria) & Victoria Metro (Victoria)
- South Australia (South Australia)
- Western Australia (Western Australia)

==== Division 2 (Defunct in 2017 now Academy Division) ====
Since 2017, the AFL has replaced state and territory representative teams with an academy division consisting of its QLD and NSW AFL Club sides: GWS Giants, Brisbane Lions, Gold Coast Suns and Sydney Swans. The following sides still contest the U16 championships but not the U18 championships:

- / New South Wales/Australian Capital Territory (New South Wales/Australian Capital Territory)
- Queensland (Queensland)
- Northern Territory (Northern Territory)
- Tasmania (Tasmania)

=== Full List ===
Currently participating

Team	Years participating	Region/s represented	Div 1 Premierships	Div 1 Premiership Year/s	Div 2 Premierships	Div 2 Premiership Year/s	Notes
Allies	2016–	Australian Capital Territory, New South Wales, Northern Territory, Queensland, Tasmania	1	2023			See also Allies team
Australian Capital Territory	1973–1995	Australian Capital Territory					(later combined within New South Wales)
Brisbane Lions	2017–	(club)					See Brisbane Lions Academy
Gold Coast Suns	2017–	(club)					See Gold Coast Suns Academy
GWS Giants	2017–	(club)					See GWS Giants Academy
New South Wales	1953–1995	New South Wales	2	1974–75	1	1993	Previously governed by NSWAFL. Combined with ACT in 1996 by AFL NSW/ACT.
New South Wales-Australian Capital Territory	1996–2016	New South Wales and Australian Capital Territory			8	1998, 2000, 2002–03, 2007, 2009, 2014, 2016	Governed by AFL NSW/ACT
Northern Territory	1979–2016	Northern Territory			2	2004, 2012	Governed by AFL Northern Territory
Papua New Guinea	1979	Papua New Guinea					See also Papua New Guinea underage national team
Queensland	1953–2016	Queensland	12	1953, 1963–73	4	1997, 1999, 2006, 2015	Governed by AFL Queensland
South Australia	1976–	South Australia	8	1978–80, 1991, 1995, 2013–14, 2018, 2025			See also South Australian state team. Governed by the South Australian National Football League
Sydney Swans	2017–	(club)					See Sydney Swans Academy
Tasmania	1976–2016	Tasmania			8	1996, 2001, 2005, 2008, 2010–11, 2013, 2018	Governed by AFL Tasmania
Victoria	1975–1988	(Victoria (state)) Victoria	9	1976–77, 1981–84, 1986–88			See also Victorian state football team. Split into Vic Metro and Vic Country in 1989
Victoria Metro	1989–	(Victoria (state)) Melbourne (Victoria)	19	1990, 1992–94, 1996–98, 2001–02, 2004–06, 2008, 2011–12, 2016–17, 2022, 2024			Governed by AFL Victoria
Victoria Country	1989–	(Victoria (state)) All areas of Victoria outside Melbourne	5	1989, 2000, 2003, 2010, 2015	2	1992, 1994	Governed by AFL Victoria Country
Western Australia	1978–	Western Australia	5	1985, 1999, 2007, 2009, 2019	1	1995	See also Western Australian state team. Governed by the West Australian Football Commission

== Sponsors ==
The tournament is currently sponsored by the National Australia Bank, having previously been sponsored by Caltex and the Commonwealth Bank.

== See also ==
- AFL Women's Under 18 Championships
