= Australian rules football injuries =

Australian rules football is a sport known for its high level of physical body contact compared to other ball sports such as soccer and basketball, as upper body tackling is legal in a similar fashion to the rugby codes and American football. High-impact collisions can occur from any direction, although deliberate collisions sometimes occur from a front-on direction (known specifically within the code as a "shirtfront" when the contact is a body-on-body collision). In addition, players of the code typically wear no protective padding of any kind except for a mouthguard or, occasionally, a helmet (unlike the full-body gear in gridiron football codes or the shin guards in soccer). As such, injury rates tend to be high.

== Muscle strains ==
Soft tissue injuries are the most frequent, including injuries to the thighs and calf muscles. Osteitis pubis is a condition which particularly affects Australian rules footballers. Injuries to the knee, ankle and shoulders are also common. Hospital-treated injuries account for 40 percent of all injuries.

== Knee injuries ==
Knee reconstructions are among the career-threatening injuries for professional and amateur players. Full-contact play with the potential to be tackled or bumped from any angle means that the risk of a knee being twisted or caught on a dangerous angle is high. Historically, players who historically had their careers ended prematurely (such as VFL/AFL legend John Coleman) can often be nursed back to full health with modern science.

== Head and neck injuries ==
While many players choose not to wear protective padding, players do occasionally suffer head injury resulting in loss of consciousness; however, spinal injury is extremely uncommon and comparatively much lower than rugby football.

== Injury prevention ==
In recent years, the AFL has commissioned official studies as well as introduced new rules and precautions aimed at reducing the number and severity of injuries in the sport. One example of a player that has suffered a large share of injuries is Essendon Hall of Famer James Hird, who has literally suffered injuries from head to foot and many between, including a hip injury that delayed his debut.

== Post-career implications ==
The high levels of injuries that take place during the course of many games of football are so much so that not only during a player's career are they susceptible to injuries but the effects afterwards are detrimental to their post-career health. Like the concussions in NFL, brain injuries, while relatively rare in Australian rules football, can occur, especially over time without sufficient precautions. Shane Tuck is one example. While suffering a severe case of the degenerative brain disease chronic traumatic encephalopathy, Tuck decided to commit suicide at 38 years old.

In a study conducted of 413 retired VFL/AFL footballers, common problems amongst the group in old age included arthritis, hip replacements (including Kevin Sheedy, who had two operations on his hip within a short period of time), and low ability to perform sport-based activities.

With respect to longevity, studies have shown that retired AFL players generally outlive the general male population in Australia. They also outlive rock musicians in Australia, but have higher death rates than cricketers or athletes in Olympic/non-contact sports.

Steven Febey spoke out in Good Weekend (the magazine of the Fairfax newspaper network) detailing that his emphasis on fitness during his career had been cancelled out after his retirement, specifically when the onset of injuries during his football career began to take their toll.

The AFL Players' Association is working on initiatives to set up a player welfare fund for post-AFL retirements that are impacted by sustained post-career injury.

== Serious or career-threatening injury cases in the AFL ==
The following is an incomplete list of incidents in AFL games which required immediate hospitalisation or threatened the career or a player.

=== 2001 ===
- Winston Abraham tore his ACL in his left knee after falling hard in a kneeling position during a collision with James Hird. The knee was badly twisted. He was on the ground for less than 1 minute. The injury ended his career.
- Jason Snell of Geelong suffered a broken ankle from which he was never able to play (or even run) again.

=== 2002 ===
- James Hird (Essendon) suffered horrific facial injuries at Subiaco in a clash against Fremantle when teammate Mark McVeigh landed unsuccessfully from a marking contest onto his face.

=== 2003 ===
- Collingwood star utility Tarkyn Lockyer was injured in the air during a tackle of a Cats player early in the round 3 clash against Geelong. His left leg was tackled alone. As his knee extended he suffered a tear in his anterior cruciate ligament, sidelining him for 12 months and starting a wretched luck with injuries for a further two years.

=== 2004 ===
- In a match between Adelaide and Essendon at AAMi Stadium, James Hird suffered an eye injury when a Crow defender attempted to spoil the ball and hit him in the side of the face. It was another in the long list of Hird injuries. Hird was taken to hospital but Essendon still managed to win easily.
- Dustin Fletcher lost most of his teeth requiring re-implantation despite wearing a mouthguard.

=== 2005 ===
- In a match between Melbourne and Richmond, Matthew Whelan of Melbourne lunged to smother a kick from Nathan Brown of Richmond. The foot became stuck in the turf, and Whelan's torso landed directly on Brown's shin, snapping both bones in the leg, in an incident whose replay has made fans shudder since. Brown calmly sat on the ground and raised his hand for a stretcher with his lower leg badly bent outwards on a 30-degree angle. Brown had several complications and relapses from the condition in the following seasons.
- During the elimination final between Melbourne and Geelong, a stray boot in a ruck contest from Geelong's Steven King connected with Melbourne's Jeff White's face. The injuries were described as "similar to those of a car accident victim," requiring the insertion of several plates.

=== 2006 ===
- In a match between Richmond and Collingwood, Chris Newman received a similar injury to his team mate Nathan Brown above.
- In a match between the Western Bulldogs and St Kilda, a hip-and-shoulder from the Bulldogs' Daniel Giansiracusa left St Kilda's notoriously unfortunate Justin Koschitzke with a fractured skull, sparking much of the debate about the safety of bumps in the game. Koschitzke has since returned to the side.
- In a game between Brisbane and the Western Bulldogs. Mitch Hahn of the Bulldogs badly hyperextended his left knee forwards after landing awkwardly and grimaced on the ground with his hands around his knee. The horrific injury put him 10 months on the sidelines.
- In a match between Collingwood and Brisbane, Blake Caracella tried to dive on a loose ball at the same time as a Lions player, though Caracella was diving and the opponent slid in on his side. Caracella's head was pushed back by his opponent, play went on, and Caracella was unable to move any lower than his neck. In the next few days, doctors said that he was lucky not to be a paraplegic after the incident. Caracella retired later that year, citing medical reasons for his decision.
- In a match between St. Kilda and West Coast, Saints backman Matt Maguire had his left leg broken as a result of Tyson Stenglein sliding into his path.
- In a match between Port Adelaide and Adelaide, Crows forward Trent Hentschel badly dislocated his right knee when a player dived on his right leg requiring a full knee reconstruction. He suffered a torn ACL and spent over a month in hospital.
- In a match between Adelaide and West Coast, Crows ruckman Rhett Biglands badly bent his left knee when Nathan Van Berlo dived into his leg in a desperate scramble for the ball. The collision forced Bigland's lower leg to bend outwards requiring a full knee reconstruction. Despite been able to walk off the ground, it was confirmed a complete tear to the ACL in the knee.
- Justin Koschitzke was again in the thick of it, fainting on live television, and smashing his head on the counter. He later collided with an umpire in a VFL match.

=== 2007 ===
- Scott Camporeale suffered a career ending knee injury in round 21 2007 when his right knee bent and twisted in the wrong direction during a sudden change in direction. ACL gone. He was delisted by Essendon after the season and will be an assistant coach for the same club.
- In the NAB Cup preseason, Nick Malceski suffered a serious injury to his right knee and after the knee reconstruction he returned to play for Sydney in round 8. Malceski created news headlines when he elected for a risky surgery technique to save his career.

=== 2009 ===
- Essendon ruckman David Hille injures his knee during the traditional ANZAC Day match against Collingwood, putting him out for the entire season.

=== 2010 ===
- Carlton ruckman Matthew Kreuzer suffers a knee injury in Carlton's round 13 defeat against Fremantle which puts him out of action for 12 months.
- Fremantle midfielder Michael Barlow suffers a horrific broken leg in Fremantle's round 14 victory against Port Adelaide when teammate Rhys Palmer slides into his path after Barlow landed from a marking contest. The injury put Barlow out for 12 months.

=== 2011 ===
- Melbourne backman James Strauss breaks his left leg after landing awkwardly in a marking contest against Carlton's Jeff Garlett.

=== 2012 ===
- Sydney's Gary Rohan suffers a compound fracture to his right leg in the opening minutes of round 4 after colliding with North Melbourne's Lindsay Thomas. The injury sidelined Rohan until round 21 2012.

== See also ==
- Head injuries in the Australian Football League
- Mental health in the Australian Football League
- Depression in the Australian Football League
