= 2003 AFL Under 18 Championships =

Youth Australian rules football competition

- Teams: 8

Division 1
- Teams: 4
- Champions: Vic Country
- Larke Medal: Kepler Bradley

Division 2
- Teams: 4
- Champions: NSW/ACT
- Hunter Harrison Medal: Jake Furfaro

The 2003 National AFL Under 18 Championships was the eighth edition of the AFL Under 18 Championships. Eight teams competed in the championships: Vic Metro, Vic Country, South Australia and Western Australia in Division 1, and New South Wales/Australian Capital Territory (NSW/ACT), Northern Territory, Queensland and Tasmania in Division 2. The competition was played over three rounds across two divisions. Vic Country and NSW/ACT were the Division 1 and Division 2 champions, respectively. The Michael Larke Medal (for the best player in Division 1) was awarded to Western Australia's Kepler Bradley, and the Hunter Harrison Medal (for the best player in Division 2) was won by Queensland's Jake Furfaro.

== Results ==
=== Division 1 ===
	Round 1
Sunday, 6 July	Vic Metro 15.7 (97)	def.	South Australia 10.16 (76)	Melbourne Cricket Ground	Report
Sunday, 6 July	Western Australia 12.8 (80)	def.	Vic Country 8.13 (61)	Melbourne Cricket Ground	Report

	Round 2
Wednesday, 9 July	South Australia 12.5 (77)	def.	Western Australia 9.13 (67)	Optus Oval	Report
Wednesday, 9 July	Vic Metro -	def. by	Vic Country -	Optus Oval	-

	Round 3
Sunday, 13 July	Vic Metro 21.9 (135)	def.	Western Australia 5.9 (39)	Melbourne Cricket Ground	Report
Sunday, 13 July	Vic Country -	def.	South Australia -	Optus Oval	-

Division 1 Ladder

TEAM	WON	LOST
Vic Country	2	1
Vic Metro	2	1
South Australia	1	2
Western Australia	1	2

=== Division 2 ===
	Round 1
Saturday, 5 July	NSW/ACT 15.12 (102)	def.	Tasmania 5.3 (33)	Melbourne Cricket Ground	Report
Saturday, 5 July	Queensland 12.8 (80)	def.	Northern Territory 6.7 (43)	TEAC Oval	Report

	Round 2
Tuesday, 8 July	NSW/ACT 12.8 (80)	def.	Northern Territory 9.7 (61)	Skilled Stadium	Report
Tuesday, 8 July	Queensland 14.14 (98)	def.	Tasmania 5.11 (41)	Skilled Stadium	Report

	Round 3
Saturday, 12 July	Northern Territory 19.11 (125)	def.	Tasmania 9.14 (68)	Optus Oval	Report
Saturday, 12 July	Queensland -	def. by	NSW/ACT -	Optus Oval	-
NSW/ACT defeated Queensland by 6 points.

Division 2 Ladder

TEAM	WON	LOST
NSW/ACT	3	0
Queensland	2	1
Northern Territory	1	2
Tasmania	0	3

== Under 18 All-Australian team ==
The 2003 Under 18 All-Australian team was named on 13 July 2003:

New South Wales/Australian Capital Territory: Shaun Daly, Nick Potter
Northern Territory: Tom Logan
Queensland: Jake Furfaro
South Australia: Adam Cooney, David Kellett, Brad Symes, Beau Waters, Josh Willoughby
Vic Country: Troy Chaplin, Ryley Dunn, Colin Sylvia, Kane Tenace, Andrew Walker
Victoria Metro: Eddie Betts, Ricky Dyson, Luke Herrington, Brock McLean, Brayden Shaw, Fergus Watts
Western Australia: Kepler Bradley, Farren Ray

Coach: Leon Harris (Vic Country)
Assistant Coach: Rod Carter (NSW/ACT)
