= 2002 AFL Under 18 Championships =

Youth Australian rules football competition

- Teams: 8

Division 1
- Teams: 4
- Champions: Vic Metro
- Larke Medal: Byron Schammer

Division 2
- Teams: 4
- Champions: NSW/ACT
- Hunter Harrison Medal: Anthony Corrie

The 2002 National AFL Under 18 Championships was the seventh edition of the AFL Under 18 Championships. Eight teams competed in the championships: Vic Metro, Vic Country, South Australia and Western Australia in Division 1, and New South Wales/Australian Capital Territory (NSW/ACT), Northern Territory, Queensland and Tasmania in Division 2. The competition was played over three rounds across two divisions. Vic Metro and NSW/ACT were the Division 1 and Division 2 champions, respectively. The Michael Larke Medal (for the best player in Division 1) was awarded to South Australia's Byron Schammer, and the Hunter Harrison Medal (for the best player in Division 2) was won by the Northern Territory's Anthony Corrie.

== Results ==
=== Division 1 ===
	Round 1
Sunday, 30 June	Vic Metro 13.8 (86)	def.	South Australia 9.7 (61)	Melbourne Cricket Ground	Report
Sunday, 30 June	Vic Country –	def.	Western Australia –	Melbourne Cricket Ground	–

	Round 2
Wednesday, 3 July	Vic Country –	def.	South Australia –	Optus Oval	–
Wednesday, 3 July	Vic Metro –	def.	Western Australia –	Optus Oval	–

	Round 3
Sunday, 6 July	Vic Metro 8.10 (58)	def.	Vic Country 8.6 (54)	Melbourne Cricket Ground	Report
Sunday, 6 July	Western Australia –	def. by	South Australia –	Melbourne Cricket Ground	–

=== Division 2 ===
	Round 1
Saturday, 29 June	Queensland 14.12 (96)	def.	Tasmania 5.8 (38)	Optus Oval	Report
Saturday, 29 June	NSW/ACT –	def. by	Northern Territory –	Optus Oval	–
Northern Territory defeated NSW/ACT by 69 points.

	Round 2
Tuesday, 2 July	NSW/ACT 9.11 (65)	def.	Queensland 5.5 (35)	Skilled Stadium	Report
Tuesday, 2 July	Northern Territory 15.13 (103)	def.	Tasmania 5.3 (33)	Skilled Stadium	Report

	Round 3
Saturday, 5 July	NSW/ACT 16.10 (106)	def.	Tasmania 14.4 (88)	Optus Oval	Report
Saturday, 5 July	Queensland –	def.	Northern Territory –	Optus Oval	–

== Under 18 All-Australian team ==
The 2002 Under 18 All-Australian team was named on 6 July 2002:

- South Australia: Daniel Bell, Adam Cooney, David Kellett, Byron Schammer
- Victoria Country: James Allan, Ryley Dunn, Matthew Ferguson, Adam Fisher, Brendon Goddard, Troy Selwood
- Victoria Metro: Stephen Gilham, Paul Johnson, Steven Salopek, Kade Simpson, Callum Urch
- Western Australia: Matthew Moody
- New South Wales/Australian Capital Territory: Ryan Crawford
- Northern Territory: Jared Brennan, Raphael Clarke, Anthony Corrie
- Queensland: Paul Shelton
- Tasmania: Luke Shackleton
- Coach: David Dickson (Vic Metro)
- Assistant coach: Darren Trevena (Northern Territory)
