= Grant Birchall =

Australian rules footballer

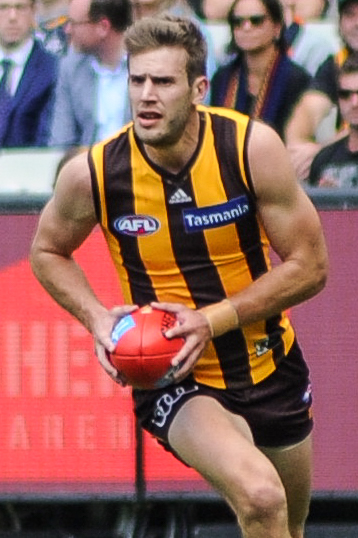
- Birchall playing in April 2017.

Personal information
- Full name: Grant Birchall
- Born: 28 January 1988 (age 38); Devonport, Tasmania
- Original team: Tassie Mariners (TAC Cup)
- Draft: No. 14, 2005 national draft
- Debut: Round 1, 2006, Hawthorn vs. Fremantle, at Aurora Stadium
- Height: 193 cm (6 ft 4 in)
- Weight: 89 kg (196 lb)
- Position: Half-Back Flank

Playing career^{1}
Years	Club	Games (Goals)
2006–2019	Hawthorn	248 (34)
2020–2021	Brisbane Lions	39 (2)
Total		287 (36)
- ^{1} Playing statistics correct to the end of 2021.

Career highlights
- 4× AFL Premiership player: 2008, 2013–2015; All-Australian team: 2012; Harrison Medal: 2005; Tasmanian Football Hall of Fame

Grant Birchall (born 28 January 1988) is a former Australian rules football player who played with the Hawthorn Football Club and Brisbane Lions in the Australian Football League.

He is a 4 time AFL Premiership player and All-Australian and a member of the Tasmanian Football Hall of Fame.

== Career ==
=== Early career (2006–2008) ===
Birchall had an exceptional first season in 2006 with the Hawthorn, playing 16 games out of a possible 22. The Tasmanian was chosen at pick 14 in the 2005 AFL draft and made his debut in the number 35 guernsey in Hawthorn's opening match of the season against Fremantle at Aurora Stadium in his home state, Tasmania.

All year, Birchall excelled across half-back for the Hawks, mainly highlighted by an impressive 23 touches in the big loss to St Kilda in round 13 and 27 touches and 10 marks in a sluggish win against the Kangaroos in round 21. To finish off the season, Birchall finished off with his best game yet- a massive 36 touches and 11 marks in the 10-goal win against Geelong.

At season's end, Birchall came sixth in the NAB AFL Rising Star, won Hawthorn's Best First Year Award and was given the number 14 jumper for the 2007 season, left vacant by Harry Miller, who was delisted by Hawthorn at the end of 2006. Grant Birchall attended St Brendan-Shaw College in Devonport, Tasmania.

2007 saw Birchall play every game for Hawthorn, and consolidate his role as a running half-back with poise and neat disposal. Many pundits are expecting the low-key young Hawk to make further progress in 2008, possibly including stints further up the ground.

=== Premierships (2008–2016) ===
Birchall played in his first AFL Premiership in 2008, when the Hawks defeated reigning premiers Geelong. Birchall lost half of his two front teeth in a collision during the match.

In 2012, Birchall had his best season to date. Birchall averaged 23.1 disposals in his 21 games in the Home and Away season with an incredible disposal efficiency of 85%. Birchall was rewarded with his first All-Australian Guernsey.

=== Injury troubles and trade (2017–2021) ===
Having only missed four of the Hawks' games over the previous three seasons, Grant Birchall's durability was struck down in 2017. Birchall managed just five games for the year, first suffering a fractured jaw in round 2 which kept him out for a month. before injuring his posterior cruciate ligament in round 7. Birchall made his return in round 14 before he injured his PCL again the following week, ending his season.

Birchall's poor luck continued through 2018 and he didn't play any football due to a persistent PCL complaint. A late-season push to be available for the finals resulted in an adductor injury.

After 720 days, Birchall made his long-awaited return playing for Hawthorn's VFL affiliate, Box Hill. He had a strong first half with 10 disposals and taking 6 marks before sitting out the second half of the game. Birchall managed the play three games for Hawthorn at the back end of the 2019 season before injuring his hamstring ending his comeback.

Out of contract at the end of 2019, Birchall was asked to shop himself around to see if he could get a better deal than what Hawthorn was willing to offer, Brisbane came up with a deal which he accepted. Birchall would be delisted at the end of 2020 and then re-drafted as a rookie. At the end of 2021, Birchall retired from the AFL.

== Statistics ==
Legend
G	Goals	K	Kicks	D	Disposals	T	Tackles
B	Behinds	H	Handballs	M	Marks

Season	Team	No.	Games	Totals							Averages (per game)							Votes
Season	Team	No.	Games	G	B	K	H	D	M	T	G	B	K	H	D	M	T	Votes
2006	Hawthorn	35	16	3	1	172	136	308	87	22	0.2	0.1	10.8	8.5	19.3	5.4	1.4	0
2007	Hawthorn	14	24	2	5	292	215	507	153	42	0.1	0.2	12.2	9.0	21.1	6.4	1.8	2
2008^{#}	Hawthorn	14	25	2	1	281	266	547	164	44	0.1	0.0	11.2	10.6	21.9	6.6	1.8	0
2009	Hawthorn	14	19	0	1	199	207	406	95	36	0.0	0.1	10.5	10.9	21.4	5.0	1.9	0
2010	Hawthorn	14	21	5	4	231	181	412	114	58	0.2	0.2	11.0	8.6	19.6	5.4	2.8	0
2011	Hawthorn	14	24	3	7	344	226	570	173	38	0.1	0.3	14.3	9.4	23.8	7.2	1.6	7
2012	Hawthorn	14	23	1	4	315	216	531	135	38	0.0	0.2	13.7	9.4	23.1	5.9	1.7	1
2013^{#}	Hawthorn	14	17	6	2	240	165	405	81	23	0.4	0.1	14.1	9.7	23.8	4.8	1.4	6
2014^{#}	Hawthorn	14	25	5	6	344	247	591	124	33	0.2	0.2	13.8	9.9	23.6	5.0	1.3	4
2015^{#}	Hawthorn	14	22	4	3	319	183	502	122	36	0.2	0.1	14.5	8.3	22.8	5.6	1.6	0
2016	Hawthorn	14	24	2	2	318	232	550	147	29	0.1	0.1	13.3	9.7	22.9	6.1	1.2	2
2017	Hawthorn	14	5	0	0	59	36	95	26	6	0.0	0.0	11.8	7.2	19.0	5.2	1.2	0
2018	Hawthorn	14	0	—	—	—	—	—	—	—	—	—	—	—	—	—	—	0
2019	Hawthorn	14	3	1	1	35	27	62	16	2	0.3	0.3	11.7	9.0	20.7	5.3	0.7	0
2020 (Note: The 2020 season was played with 17 home-and-away matches per team (down from 22) and 16-minute quarters with time on (down from 20-minute quarters with time on) due to the impact of the COVID-19 pandemic.)	Brisbane Lions	14	16	0	0	150	53	203	69	16	0.0	0.0	9.4	3.3	12.7	4.3	1.0	0
2021	Brisbane Lions	14	23	2	0	307	118	425	159	23	0.1	0.0	13.3	5.1	18.5	6.9	1.0	0
Career			287	36	37	3606	2508	6114	1665	446	0.1	0.1	12.6	8.7	21.3	5.8	1.6	22

== Honours and achievements ==
Team

- 4× AFL premiership player (Hawthorn): 2008, 2013, 2014, 2015
- 2× Minor premiership (Hawthorn): 2012, 2013

Individual

- All-Australian team: 2012
- Hawthorn best first year player (debut season): 2006
- AFL Rising Star nominee: 2006
- 2× Australia international rules football team: 2014, 2015
- Under 18 All-Australian team: 2005
- Tasmanian Football Hall of Fame
- Hawthorn life member
