= Richard Tambling =

Australian rules footballer, born 1986

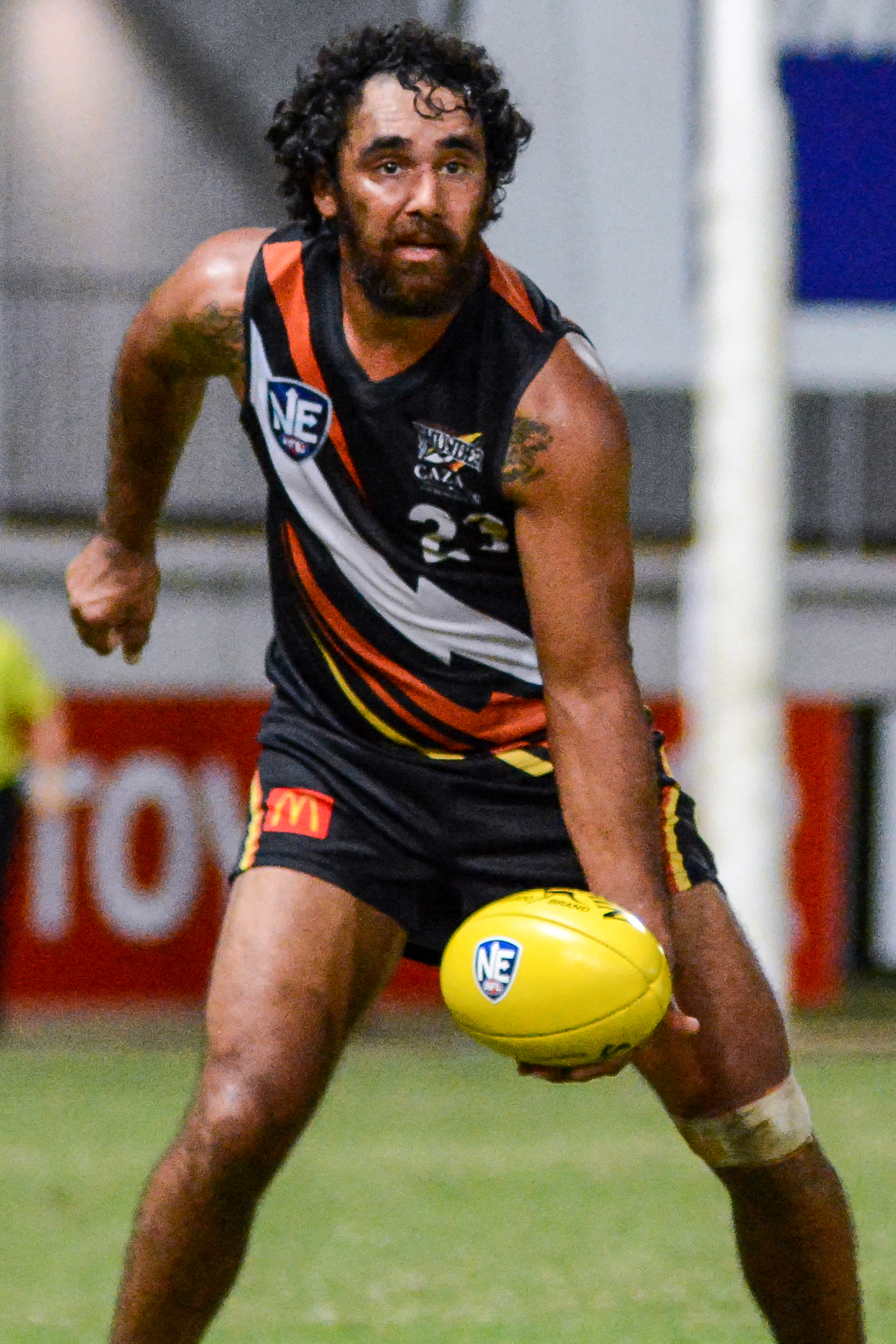
- Tambling playing for NT Thunder in June 2016

Personal information
- Full name: Richard Tambling
- Nickname: Bling
- Born: 12 September 1986 (age 40); Northern Territory
- Original team: Southern Districts
- Draft: 4th overall, 2004; Richmond
- Height: 180 cm (5 ft 11 in)
- Weight: 81 kg (179 lb)

Playing career^{1}
Years	Club	Games (Goals)
2005–2010	Richmond	108 (61)
2011–2013	Adelaide	16 (1)
Total		124 (62)
- ^{1} Playing statistics correct to the end of 2013.

Career highlights
- Junior: Harrison Medal: 2004; SANFL: Sturt best & fairest: 2012

Richard Tambling (born 12 September 1986) is a former Australian rules footballer who played for the Richmond Football Club and the Adelaide Football Club in the Australian Football League (AFL).

== Early life ==
Tambling is from the Northern Territory, he grew up in a remote aboriginal community until the age of 13 before moving to Jabiru in Kakadu where he spent most of his childhood, he played footy as a junior but not seriously. English was not his first language growing up. As a teenager he moved to Darwin, Northern Territory to live with his grandmother where he got more serious about football joined the NT Thunder program and played in the underage national championships. It was there that he was identified by talent scouts. He had long been considered a dominant player up in the Northern Territory with his explosive speed and ability to read the play; he only confirmed that status throughout the 2004 pre-season. Terry Wallace was particularly impressed, saying he and Deledio were the "best young kids in the country".

In the 2004 AFL draft Tambling was a first round selection, the number four pick overall, and drafted to the Richmond Football Club. Richmond had the opportunity to recruit Lance Franklin, some say this was bad judgement made by the Richmond recruitment personnel. In comparison to Franklin, Tambling's tenure at Richmond has been enigmatic.

== AFL career ==
=== Richmond (2005-2010) ===
He played in 12 games in the 2005 AFL season and a further 21 in the 2006 AFL season. In the latter stages of 2005, Tambling struggled with injury, including a broken toe and a consistent hamstring problem.

By 2009 the constant criticism of the underperforming midfielder reached new heights in the round 3 match between the Western Bulldogs and the Richmond Tigers. Tambling's game was viewed by many experts as one of the worst performances of faltering career due to the amount of costly turnovers from his small total of 12 possessions. He received a bronx cheer from the Richmond fans after getting his first kick which also happened to be a turnover. Coach Terry Wallace later explained that Tambling had become a father in the two days earlier, which had affected his sleep before the match. Tambling was dropped from the Richmond team for the following match against the Demons. After a week at Coburg, he returned to the AFL in arguably the best form of his career. Very influential against Sydney, Fremantle, and the West Coast Eagles, he was finally showing the ability that was expected of him with his high draft pick.

=== Adelaide (2011-2013) ===
On 6 October 2010 Tambling was traded to the Adelaide Crows in exchange for a first and a third round draft selection. He was delisted at the end of the 2013 season, following 16 AFL matches over three years at the club.

== State league football ==
After playing for Sturt in the SANFL, he has since played for the NT Thunder in the 2015, 2016 and 2017 NEAFL competitions.

== Statistics ==
Legend
G	Goals	K	Kicks	D	Disposals	T	Tackles
B	Behinds	H	Handballs	M	Marks

Season	Team	No.	Games	Totals							Averages (per game)						
Season	Team	No.	Games	G	B	K	H	D	M	T	G	B	K	H	D	M	T
2005	Richmond	30	12	9	4	73	38	111	41	28	0.8	0.3	6.1	3.2	9.2	3.4	2.1
2006	Richmond	30	21	14	19	176	76	252	92	48	0.7	0.9	8.4	3.6	12.0	4.4	2.3
2007	Richmond	30	20	17	9	160	112	272	93	49	0.8	0.4	8.0	5.6	13.6	4.6	2.4
2008	Richmond	30	22	10	9	202	182	384	113	72	0.4	0.4	9.2	8.3	17.4	5.1	3.3
2009	Richmond	30	20	8	11	241	189	430	128	63	0.4	0.6	12.0	9.4	21.5	6.4	3.2
2010	Richmond	30	13	3	3	79	84	163	38	57	0.2	0.2	6.1	6.5	12.5	2.9	4.4
2011	Adelaide	1	10	0	0	68	77	145	36	28	0.0	0.0	6.8	7.7	14.5	3.6	2.8
2012	Adelaide	1	1	0	0	4	2	6	2	2	0.0	0.0	4.0	2.0	6.0	2.0	2.0
2013	Adelaide	1	5	1	0	36	44	80	23	15	0.2	0.0	7.2	8.8	16.0	4.6	3.0
Career			124	62	55	1039	804	1843	566	359	0.5	0.4	8.4	6.5	14.9	4.6	2.9

== Personal life ==
Richard is an Indigenous Australian and his ancestry can be traced to the Woolna, a Northern Territory tribe.
