= 2007 AFL Under 18 Championships =

Youth Australian rules football competition

- Teams: 8

Division 1
- Teams: 4
- Champions: Western Australia
- Larke Medal: Cale Morton

Division 2
- Teams: 4
- Champions: NSW/ACT
- Hunter Harrison Medal: Craig Bird

The 2007 NAB AFL Under 18 Championships was the 12th edition of the AFL Under 18 Championships. Eight teams competed in the championships: Vic Metro, Vic Country, South Australia and Western Australia in Division 1, and New South Wales/Australian Capital Territory (NSW/ACT), Northern Territory, Queensland and Tasmania in Division 2. The competition was played over three rounds across two divisions. Western Australia and New South Wales/Australian Capital Territory (NSW/ACT) were the Division 1 and Division 2 champions, respectively. The Larke Medal (for the best player in Division 1) was awarded to Western Australia's Cale Morton, and the Hunter Harrison Medal (for the best player in Division 2) was won by NSW/ACT midfielder Craig Bird.

== Results ==
=== Division 1 ===
	Round 1
Saturday, 30 June	Western Australia 15.16 (106)	def.	Vic Metro 8.10 (58)	Subiaco Oval
Sunday, 1 July	South Australia 17.10 (112)	def.	Vic Country 9.8 (62)	AAMI Stadium

	Round 2
Friday, 6 July	Vic Country 3.7 (25)	def. by	Western Australia 9.14 (68)	MC Labour Park
Friday, 6 July	Vic Metro 7.7 (49)	def.	South Australia 3.5 (23)	MC Labour Park

	Round 3
Wednesday, 11 July	Vic Metro 17.8 (110)	def.	Vic Country 9.8 (62)	Casey Fields
Wednesday, 11 July	Western Australia 20.11 (131)	def.	South Australia 8.6 (54)	Casey Fields

Division 1 Ladder

TEAM	WON	LOST	FOR	AGAINST	PERCENTAGE
Western Australia	3	0	305	137	222.6%
Vic Metro	2	1	217	191	113.6%
South Australia	1	2	189	242	78.1%
Vic Country	0	3	149	290	51.4%

=== Division 2 ===
	Round 1
Saturday, 23 June	Queensland 13.13 (91)	def. by	Tasmania 17.14 (116)	Sydney Cricket Ground
Saturday, 23 June	NSW/ACT 20.11 (131)	def.	Northern Territory 12.11 (83)	Telstra Stadium

	Round 2
Thursday, 5 July	Northern Territory 13.12 (90)	def.	Tasmania 5.15 (45)	Skilled Stadium
Thursday, 5 July	NSW/ACT 15.19 (109)	def.	Queensland 7.5 (47)	Skilled Stadium

	Round 3
Tuesday, 10 July	Northern Territory 17.9 (111)	def.	Queensland 12.13 (85)	Victoria Park
Tuesday, 10 July	Tasmania 13.14 (92)	def. by	NSW/ACT 20.13 (133)	Victoria Park

Division 2 Ladder

TEAM	WON	LOST	FOR	AGAINST	PERCENTAGE
NSW/ACT	3	0	373	222	168.0%
Northern Territory	2	1	284	261	108.8%
Tasmania	1	2	253	314	80.6%
Queensland	0	3	223	336	66.4%

== Under 18 All-Australian team ==
The 2007 Under 18 All-Australian team was named on 11 July 2007:

2007 Under 18 All-Australian team
B:	Nick Suban (VC)	Michael Hurley (VM)	Alex Rance (WA)
HB:	Scott Selwood (VC)	Tom Collier (Tas)	David Myers (WA)
C:	Daniel Rich (WA)	Rhys Palmer (WA)	Cale Morton (WA)
HF:	Brad Ebert (SA)	Ben McEvoy (VC)	Jack Grimes (VM)
F:	Addam Maric (VM)	Aaron Cornelius (Tas)	Cyril Rioli (NT)
Foll:	Matthew Kreuzer (VM)	Craig Bird (NSW/ACT)	Chris Masten (WA)
Int:	Nic Naitanui (WA)	Aaron Joseph (Tas)	Patrick McGinnity (WA)
Int:	Taylor Walker (NSW/ACT)		
Coach:	Gerard McNeil (WA), assistant coach - Danny Stevens (NSW/ACT)		
