= 2005 AFL Under 18 Championships =

Youth Australian rules football competition

2005 AFL Under-18 Championships
- Teams: 8

Division 1
- Teams: 4
- Champions: Vic Metro
- Larke Medal: Marc Murphy

Division 2
- Teams: 4
- Champions: Tasmania
- Hunter Harrison Medal: Grant Birchall

The 2005 NAB AFL Under-18 Championships was the 10th edition of the AFL Under 18 Championships. Eight teams competed in the championships: Vic Metro, Vic Country, South Australia and Western Australia in Division 1, and New South Wales/Australian Capital Territory (NSW/ACT), Northern Territory, Queensland and Tasmania in Division 2. The competition was played over three rounds across two divisions. Vic Metro and Tasmania were the Division 1 and Division 2 champions, respectively. The Larke Medal (for the best player in Division 1) was awarded to Victoria Metro's Marc Murphy, and the Hunter Harrison Medal (for the best player in Division 2) was won by Tasmania's Grant Birchall.

== Results ==
=== Division 1 ===
	Round 1
Sunday, 26 June (10:30 am)	Vic Country 5.11 (41)	def. by	South Australia 14.8 (92)	Optus Oval	Report
Sunday, 26 June (12:45 pm)	Vic Metro 13.10 (88)	def.	Western Australia 9.7 (61)	Optus Oval	Report

	Round 2
Wednesday, 29 June (10:30 am)	South Australia 3.11 (29)	def. by	Western Australia 11.10 (76)	Skilled Stadium	Report
Wednesday, 29 June (12:45 pm)	Vic Country 7.5 (47)	def. by	Vic Metro 12.13 (85)	Skilled Stadium	Report

	Round 3
Sunday, 3 July (10:30 am)	Vic Country 6.10 (46)	def. by	Western Australia 13.9 (87)	Optus Oval	Report
Sunday, 3 July (12:45 pm)	Vic Metro 14.4 (88)	def.	South Australia 9.11 (65)	Optus Oval	Report

Division 1 Ladder

TEAM	WON	LOST	FOR	AGAINST	PERCENTAGE
Vic Metro	3	0	261	173	150.9%
Western Australia	2	1	224	163	137.4%
South Australia	1	2	186	205	90.7%
Vic Country	0	3	134	264	50.8%

=== Division 2 ===
	Round 1
Saturday, 25 June (11:00 am)	Northern Territory 8.3 (51)	def. by	Tasmania 18.5 (113)	Optus Oval	Report
Saturday, 25 June (1:30 pm)	Queensland 9.9 (63)	def.	NSW/ACT 7.5 (47)	Optus Oval	Report
Tasmanian Todd Grima kicked 10 goals against the Northern Territory.

	Round 2
Tuesday, 28 June (11:00 am)	Queensland 15.7 (97)	def.	Northern Territory 6.10 (46)	Skilled Stadium	Report
Tuesday, 28 June (1:30 pm)	Tasmania 11.11 (77)	def.	NSW/ACT 10.6 (66)	Skilled Stadium	Report

	Round 3
Saturday, 2 July (11:00 am)	Northern Territory 5.7 (37)	def. by	NSW/ACT 14.10 (94)	Optus Oval	Report
Saturday, 2 July (1:30 pm)	Tasmania 13.14 (92)	def.	Queensland 12.9 (81)	Optus Oval	Report

Division 2 Ladder

TEAM	WON	LOST	FOR	AGAINST	PERCENTAGE
Tasmania	3	0	282	198	142.4%
Queensland	2	1	241	185	130.3%
NSW/ACT	1	2	213	177	120.3%
Northern Territory	0	3	134	304	44.1%

== Under-18 All-Australian team ==
The 2005 Under-18 All-Australian team was named on 4 July 2005:

For the first time, the Under-18 All-Australian side was named in position to give balance and recognition to players that played terrific roles in defence, as well as players who were creative up forward, so it was not just a midfielders' side. It recognised players across the ground for their performance they put in throughout the Under 18 Championships.

The 2005 Under-18 All-Australian team selectors were: Kevin Sheehan (AFL Talent Manager), Alan McConnell (AIS-AFL High Performance Coach), James Fantasia (Adelaide Recruiting Manager), Kinnear Beatson (Brisbane Lions Recruiting Manager), Neville Stibbard (Kangaroos Recruiting Manager), Francis Jackson (Richmond Recruiting Officer)

2005 Under-18 All-Australian team
B:	Xavier Ellis (VC)	Austin Lucy (Qld)	Shannon Hurn (SA)
HB:	Darren Pfeiffer (SA)	Paul Bower (WA)	Joel Selwood (VC)
C:	Jace Bode (SA)	Andrew Swallow (WA)	Grant Birchall (Tas)
HF:	Beau Dowler (VC)	Cleve Hughes (SA)	Dale Thomas (VC)
F:	Leroy Jetta (WA)	Ben McKinley (VM)	Josh Kennedy (WA)
Foll:	Paddy Ryder (WA)	Marc Murphy (VM)	Nathan Jones (VM)
Int:	Todd Grima (Tas)	Sam Lonergan (Tas)	Wayde Mills (Qld)
Int:	Gavin Urquhart (Qld)		
Coach:	David Dickson (VM); Assistant Coach: Hamish Ogilvie (Tas)		
