= Mental health in association football =

The subject of mental health in association football has been described as a "stigma" in the sport, although other professional sports are also affected. Studies suggest that professional footballers may experience higher rates of depression and anxiety compared to the general population.

== Notable cases ==
After suffering from depression, former England international George Harrison died by suicide in 1939, aged 46.

Agostino Di Bartolomei suffered from clinical depression after retiring from professional football and eventually committed suicide by shooting himself in his villa in San Marco di Castellabate, on 30 May 1994, ten years to the day after his former club Roma had lost the European Cup final to Liverpool on penalties.

Argentine footballer Mirko Šarić committed suicide by hanging in April 2000, after suffering with depression which was reportedly worsened by the fact that his girlfriend at the time was pregnant by another man.

During the first part of the 2000–01 season with Everton, Paul Gascoigne struggled with depression after losing his place in the first team following a series of injuries and a lack of fitness. Later in his career, during his time with Chinese club Gansu Tianma, he went to America in April 2003 for treatment against alcoholism and depression.

Former professional players Robert Enke and Gary Speed have died by suicide; both suffered from depression. Enke died by suicide in a railway incident. Five years after Enke's death his wife stated that she believed depression in sport was no longer a taboo subject. Speed hanged himself. In September 2018 his wife said that she discovered a letter written by Speed as a teenager which hinted at his long-term depression. In 2019 a 10-year memorial event for Enke was held at theatre hall in Hannover.

Clarke Carlisle stated that he contemplated suicide after becoming injured early in his career, and in December 2014 attempted suicide due to the severe depression he was suffering from.

American former player Landon Donovan has spoken publicly about dealing with depression throughout his life and career and has criticized the professional sports world for its approach to mental health issues.

Sebastian Deisler was hospitalised after being unable to cope with the pressures of professional football, eventually retiring from the sport aged 27.

Jean-Marc Bosman struggled to find work after his judicial challenge of the football transfer rules led to the Bosman ruling in 1995. He ended up living off of welfare and as a result of his financial difficulties and his claimed ostracism by the world of football, he fell into depression and also struggled with alcoholism.

Adriano struggled with depression and alcoholism following the death of his father in 2004.

In November 2008, Gianluigi Buffon revealed in his autobiography Numero 1 that he had suffered from depression between December 2003 and June 2004 and that he saw a psychologist during this period in order to overcome it; he later elaborated further on his struggles with depression in 2013. In January 2019, he also revealed that because of his depression, he had suffered from panic attacks during his early career with Juventus, even missing a game as a result during the 2003–04 season.

Ex-player Mickey Bennett set up an organisation called Unique Sports Counselling to help footballers deal with mental health issues.

In February 2016, Steve Harper spoke out about his mental health problems while in between clubs. The PFA had to apologise after initially criticising his comments.

In May 2016, professional footballer Chris Mitchell committed suicide. In October 2018 his family spoke out about his struggles with mental health.

In May 2017, Aaron Lennon was detained under the Mental Health Act and he received treatment for a "stress-related illness". In March 2019 he spoke about the incident and said that other players had asked him for advice.

In June 2017, Steven Caulker spoke about his struggles with depression and his addiction to alcohol and gambling.

In February 2018 David Cox stated that he had been mocked by both players and fans for discussing his mental health problems.

In March 2018, the UK government announced plans to deal with mental health in professional sports. Later that month, Harry Smith released a statement stating that he was seeking help for mental health and gambling addiction problems. That same month, Danish player Jannik Skov Hansen talked about the depression and suicidal thoughts he had experienced earlier in his career.

In April 2018 The Secret Footballer, an anonymous former Premier League player, talked about his depression.

In May 2018, Andrés Iniesta revealed that he suffered from depression before the 2010 FIFA World Cup due to his injuries and the death of his friend Daniel Jarque.

In June 2018, England international Danny Rose stated that he had been diagnosed with depression.

In September 2018, professional footballer Marvin Sordell suggested that clubs should have full-time counsellors to assist players with depression and other mental health issues. When Sordell retired from football in July 2019 he cited his mental health. Later that month Anthony Knockaert also revealed his struggles with mental health issues, as did David Cotterill.

In October 2018, Michael Carrick announced that he had suffered from depression for 2 years following the defeat in the 2009 UEFA Champions League Final. Later that month Christian Nadé revealed that he had tried to commit suicide in 2014 following struggles with depression.

In June 2019, former player Emmanuel Eboué spoke about his ongoing struggles with mental health. In August 2019 Martin Ling discussed his mental health problems.

Billy Kee has spoken publicly about his struggles with anxiety and depression, which led him to considering giving up football. In September 2019 it was revealed that Kee was seeking treatment for depression, anxiety and bulimia. During that same month, the English Football League announced a scheme in conjunction with mental health charity Mind called 'Get Set to Go'. This included a series of street art pieces to raise awareness about mental health. Later that month, Motherwell manager Stephen Robinson said clubs had a duty of care in relation to players' mental well-being if they were injured. Kee announced his retirement from professional football on 29 January 2020 due to mental health.

In October 2019, Francesco Acerbi revealed that during his time with Milan he had suffered from depression following the death of his father and fell into alcoholism as a result of the loss and his personal struggles.

In November 2019, initiatives to promote mental health in football included Prince William meeting with West Bromwich Albion players to discuss the topic.

In December 2019, ex-professional Rhodri Jones spoke out about the pressures that young players face.

The kick-offs for all third-round FA Cup matches over the weekend of 4 and 5 January 2020 were delayed by 60 seconds to promote a film narrated by Prince William about mental health. That same weekend ex-player Paul Merson spoke about his struggles with mental health. Later that month former player Brian Lenihan revealed that he retired from professional football aged 23 because of mental health issues.

For the 2020–21 season, Newport County appointed Kevin Ellison as their 'mental health ambassador'. In June 2018 he has publicly talked about his struggles with depression, giving advice to fellow professionals.

In October 2020, former Manchester City academy player Jeremy Wisten committed suicide by hanging in his home in Baguley. He had been released the year before by the club, and had struggled to find a new club while recovering from a knee injury. His death led to Manchester City changing how they went about releasing young players, including introducing player exit surveys and creating a 'parent portal' to improve communication between the club, players, and their families.

In January 2021, Cheltenham Town captain Ben Tozer spoke about his previous struggles with anxiety, which led to him nearly quitting the game. That same month Jordon Ibe revealed that he was suffering with depression, describing himself as being in a "dark place".

In April 2021, Scottish footballer David Cox retired in the middle of a match, leaving the stadium at the half-time break, after alleged comments from opposition player Jonathan Tiffoney related to Cox's mental health.

In January 2022, Josip Iličić missed game time due to mental health issues. Previously, he also missed crucial quarterfinal Champions League game due to mental health issues. His then Atalanta team-mate Alejandro Gómez stated that Iličić had fallen into depression after catching coronavirus during the COVID-19 pandemic.

In February 2022 former players Chris Sutton and Micah Richards spoke about mental health issues in their playing days.

In March 2022, Paul Pogba said that he had suffered from depression whilst being managed by José Mourinho at Manchester United during 2018.

In May 2022, Dominic Calvert-Lewin spoke out about his mental health problems. That same month the WSL academies began a campaign around mental health.

In June 2022 Tottenham players Harry Kane and Matt Doherty discussed the matter of mental health in professional sport.

In September 2022, Francesco Totti revealed that he struggled with depression following his retirement from professional football, as well as due to his father's death during the COVID-19 pandemic in Italy, and the infidelity of his wife Ilary Blasi.

In October 2022, Steven Reid revealed that he had left his job as Nottingham Forest assistant manager in order to begin studying to qualify as a counsellor. That month, Theo Vassell stated that he had battled with depression since childhood, which led to suicide attempts as a teenager.

In October 2022, American player Christian Pulisic released an autobiography titled Pulisic: My Journey So Far. In the book, he revealed that he suffered with depression while he was injured in 2020 and during times that he did not get much playing time.

In November 2022, Prince William and footballers Harry Kane and Declan Rice discussed mental health for the BBC, in an effort to raise awareness.

Millie Farrow has struggled with obsessive compulsive disorder throughout her career. In 2023, she released a book called Brave Enough Not To Quit, which details how she deals with her OCD and anxiety.

In February 2023, France national team player Wendie Renard announced that she would not play at the 2023 FIFA Women's World Cup in order to "preserve" her "mental health"; teammates Kadidiatou Diani and Marie-Antoinette Katoto also announced their retirement from the national team.

Former Manchester United youth team captain Tom Thorpe spent five years away from the sport due to mental health problems, returning in 2023.

In July 2023, Dele Alli said he had spent 6 weeks in rehab for sleeping pill addiction and mental health issues, linked to childhood abuse.

In September 2023, Brazilian footballer Richarlison said that he would seek "psychological help" for off-pitch issues that were affecting his playing. Later that month, Bradford City announced a campaign to promote mental health. The following year, he revealed that he struggled with depression following Brazil's elimination from the 2022 FIFA World Cup and even considered quitting football as a result. He urged other players to seek therapy for struggles with mental illness.

In October 2023, Norwich City released a video for World Mental Health Day which was praised by UEFA.

In November 2023, a number of England players including Beth Mead and Ben Chilwell launched a new mental health initiative.

In December 2023, Northern Ireland player Rebecca Holloway discussed her mental health problems.

In January 2024, former player Thierry Henry said he had been depressed throughout his career. Later that month, active player James Talbot announced he was 'stepping back' from football due to his mental health. The BBC also asked whether the Women's Super League was doing enough to support women's footballers. Also in January 2024, Tyreece John-Jules said that a spate of injuries was taking a toll on him mentally.

In March 2024, former footballer Dani Osvaldo revealed that he had been undergoing treatment for his struggles with depression, which had led to his addictions to alcohol and drugs.

In June 2024, it was revealed that the Bradford City mental health supporters' group had helped 500 people.

In July 2024, Scottish referee chief Willie Collum warned that criticism of referees would affect their mental health.

In October 2024, a Professional Footballers' Association survey of 1,000 players found that 68% felt that the fear of injuries impacted their mental health.

In December 2024, Tino Anjorin spoke about his mental health problems whilst injured.

In May 2025, Dan Burn spoke about his struggles with mental health, as he had struggled particularly early in his career.

In October 2025, West Ham Women manager Rehanne Skinner spoke about the mental health of women managers.

In December 2025, FC Barcelona player Ronald Araujo spoke about his mental health and took a break from football due to it.

In February 2026, Dwight McNeil's partner criticised Crystal Palace after a transfer fell through at a late stage, negatively impacting McNeil's mental health.

In May 2026, Dan Burn spoke positively about how therapy had helped his mental health.

In September 2026, Sam Hutchinson revealed that he had sought help for depression after having to retire from injuries in 2010, before latter returning to play.

== See also ==
- Mental health in the Australian Football League
