= Stephen Gilham =

Australian rules footballer (born 1984)

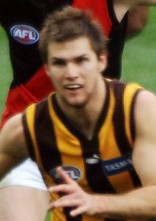
- Gilham playing for Hawthorn in 2007

Personal information
- Full name: Stephen Gilham
- Born: 2 September 1984 (age 42)
- Original team: Oakleigh Chargers (TAC Cup)
- Draft: No. 16, 2002 national draft
- Debut: Round 18, 2005, Port Adelaide vs. Kangaroos, at Manuka Oval
- Height: 192 cm (6 ft 4 in)
- Weight: 86 kg (190 lb)
- Position: Defender

Playing career^{1}
Years	Club	Games (Goals)
2003–2005	Port Adelaide	1 (0)
2006–2012	Hawthorn	98 (4)
2013–2014	Greater Western Sydney	15 (0)
Total		114 (4)
- ^{1} Playing statistics correct to the end of 2014.

Career highlights
- AFL premiership player: 2008; Under 18 All-Australian team: 2002

Stephen Gilham (born 2 September 1984) is a former professional Australian rules footballer who played for the Port Adelaide Football Club, Hawthorn Football Club and Greater Western Sydney Giants in the Australian Football League (AFL). He now works as a Partnerships Manager with Swisse.

Gilham's junior career was distinguished, playing for Oakleigh Chargers in the TAC Cup and in 2002 he was chosen to captain the Victoria Metro under 18 side in the national carnival. A skinny defender, Gilham was taken by Port Adelaide with its second pick (pick 16 overall) in the 2002 AFL draft.

== AFL career ==
=== Port Adelaide ===
Gilham's three seasons at Port Adelaide were hampered by groin and shoulder injuries, together with difficulty gaining the strength to succeed as a key defender in the AFL. Gilham only managed one senior game during his time in South Australia, in 2005 as result of an injury and illness to two other players. He was delisted at the end of the season. Gilham's return to Victoria (and the AFL) came courtesy of Hawthorn, who selected him with pick 34 in the 2006 Rookie draft.

=== Hawthorn ===
Gilham spent most of 2006 playing for Hawthorn's VFL affiliate team, Box Hill, before eventually earning an opportunity in the senior side in the round 19 match against Carlton. He remained in the side for the remainder of the season, and impressed observers with his composure under pressure.

In recognition of his improvement in both game play and muscle mass, Gilham was promoted to Hawthorn's senior list for season 2007. During the 2007 season, Gilham consolidated a role in the senior side. He played every match for the year, and was effective on a wide range of opponents in defence. His solid form continued in 2008, culminating with a key role in the 2008 AFL Grand Final. After fellow key defender Trent Croad was forced from the field with a broken foot early in the second quarter, Gilham's presence provided vital stability on the last line, helping the team to claim the 2008 AFL premiership.

Gilham injured his left knee when he hyperextended in a NAB Cup quarter-final against Carlton more in 2009 pre-season cup.

In round eight of the 2011 season whilst playing against St Kilda, Gilham ruptured the anterior cruciate ligament in his right knee and then missed the rest of the season

=== Greater Western Sydney ===
Gilham was traded to the Greater Western Sydney Giants on 26 October 2012.

On 26 August 2014, Gilham announced his retirement from the AFL, effective at the end of the season.

== Statistics ==
Legend
G	Goals	K	Kicks	D	Disposals	T	Tackles
B	Behinds	H	Handballs	M	Marks

Season	Team	No.	Games	Totals							Averages (per game)							Votes
Season	Team	No.	Games	G	B	K	H	D	M	T	G	B	K	H	D	M	T	Votes
2003	Port Adelaide	32	0	—	—	—	—	—	—	—	—	—	—	—	—	—	—	—
2004	Port Adelaide	32	0	—	—	—	—	—	—	—	—	—	—	—	—	—	—	—
2005	Port Adelaide	32	1	0	0	1	0	1	0	0	0.0	0.0	1.0	0.0	1.0	0.0	0.0	0
2006	Hawthorn	42	4	0	0	26	36	62	23	4	0.0	0.0	6.5	9.0	15.5	5.8	1.0	0
2007	Hawthorn	27	24	1	0	176	134	310	150	33	0.0	0.0	7.3	5.6	12.9	6.3	1.4	0
2008^{#}	Hawthorn	27	24	1	0	163	159	322	133	22	0.0	0.0	6.8	6.6	13.4	5.5	0.9	0
2009	Hawthorn	27	10	0	0	54	93	147	40	22	0.0	0.0	5.4	9.3	14.7	4.0	2.2	0
2010	Hawthorn	27	23	1	1	150	131	281	99	37	0.0	0.0	6.5	5.7	12.2	4.3	1.6	0
2011	Hawthorn	27	7	0	0	52	32	84	27	7	0.0	0.0	7.4	4.6	12.0	3.9	1.0	0
2012	Hawthorn	27	6	1	0	38	35	73	23	7	0.2	0.0	6.3	5.8	12.2	3.8	1.2	0
2013	Greater Western Sydney	38	14	0	0	140	73	213	81	19	0.0	0.0	10.0	5.2	15.2	5.8	1.4	0
2014	Greater Western Sydney	38	1	0	0	4	5	9	4	1	0.0	0.0	4.0	5.0	9.0	4.0	1.0	0
Career			114	4	1	804	698	1502	580	152	0.0	0.0	7.1	6.1	13.2	5.1	1.3	0

== Honours and achievements ==
Team

- AFL premiership player (Hawthorn): 2008
- Minor premiership (Hawthorn): 2012

Individual

- Under 18 All-Australian team: 2002
