= Sam Power =

Australian rules footballer (born 1983)

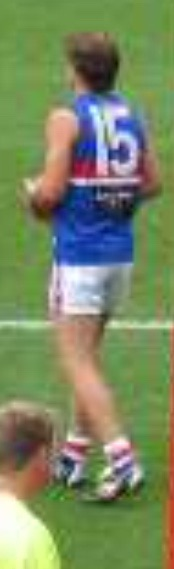
- image of Sam Power

Personal information
- Full name: Sam Power
- Born: 2 July 1983 (age 43)
- Original team: Balwyn Football Club/Oakleigh Chargers
- Draft: No. 10, 2001 national draft
- Height: 190 cm (6 ft 3 in)
- Weight: 82 kg (181 lb)
- Position: Midfielder

Playing career^{1}
Years	Club	Games (Goals)
2002–2007	Western Bulldogs	84 (16)
2008–2009	North Melbourne	39 (2)
Total		123 (18)
- ^{1} Playing statistics correct to the end of 2009.

Career highlights
- Larke Medal, 2001

Sam Power (born 2 July 1983) is an Australian rules footballer who played in the Australian Football League (AFL).

Power started his career at the Western Bulldogs. The Bulldogs selected him in the 2001 AFL draft, with their first round selection, number 10 overall. Power made his debut in 2002, playing six games, and amassed 84 games in total over five years with the Bulldogs.

After being unable to hold a consistent senior spot in the 2007 season, Power requested a trade. North Melbourne expressed interest and traded their draft pick number 48 in the 2007 AFL draft in return for Power.

At North Melbourne, Power was a regular senior player being used in the hard running, run-with player role. 2009 saw an up and down season for both Power, and the football club, with his place in the side coming under question due to a push towards youth, with an eye to the future. At the end of the 2009 season, his contract was not renewed and he was delisted.

In 2017, Power was appointed list manager of the Bulldogs. He had previously worked at Carlton from 2013 in scouting, as an integrity officer, and as a company secretary.

Power's older brother, Luke, is a multiple premiership winning player with the Brisbane Lions.
