= Mental health in the Australian Football League =

Mental health refers to a person's mental state, well-being, and ability to cope with the daily stresses of life. Good mental health also means that one has the ability to be mentally resilient, have a good life balance, having an absence of mental disorders and the ability to enjoy life. Elite athletes such as those competing in the Australian Football League(AFL) can experience a range of stressors that are unique to the sporting environment, such as performance pressure, travel, selection pressures, racial vilification and abuse, and public and media scrutiny. Studies show that elite athletes experience mental health challenges and conditions at rates that are reasonably comparable with the rest of the population. While elite sport can come with additional stressors for athletes, sport can also promote wellbeing, with athletes, including Australian Rules footballers, experiencing higher rates of flourishing and emotional wellbeing than their non-athlete counterparts.

== Industry-wide strategy ==
In 2024, the AFL launched a comprehensive Industry Mental Health Strategy designed to embed mental health and wellbeing support across football systems. The strategy focuses on four pillars, Prevent & Empower, Promote, Respond, and Continuously Improve. The strategy outlines targeted action plans for players, coaches, umpires, staff, and talent development pathways. It aims to increase protective factors, reduce risk factors, and foster a culture in which all individuals “are supported to thrive in football, work and life”

=== Mental Health & Wellbeing in the Talent Pathway ===
Additionally, The AFL extends its Mental Health & Wellbeing strategy into talent development systems, embedding preventative mental health education and support across its national pathways. Implementation is coordinated by regionally based Wellbeing Managers under the broader oversight of the AFL’s Mental Health & Wellbeing team, ensuring consistent and systemic delivery across states and competitions. This approach aligns with the AFL’s Industry Mental Health Strategy and Charter, reinforcing a youth-first model that prioritises prevention, early intervention, and a strong support network from grassroots to professional ranks.

== Society and culture ==
Athletes are sometimes viewed as superheroes or as needing to be strong. This perception can sometimes make it harder for athletes to acknowledge mental health challenges or seek help. Other barriers to help seeking that are specific to sport include concerns around selection or playing time. However, athletes seek mental health help at approximately the same rate as the rest of the Australian population. Access to services within the elite sport setting and practitioners who understand sport facilitates accessing mental health services for athletes. Promoting mental health across all levels of the sport system and providing access to mental health practitioners help to protect the mental health and wellbeing of athletes

== History ==
There have been a few cases made public of AFL players suffering from mental health problems. In 2015 it was noted that Mitch Clark from Geelong Football Club has been suffering from mental health problems.

Also in 2015 Adam Goodes took a week off training and playing because of the 'emotional toll' he was put under during the season, receiving boos and racist comments from the crowd. He was also under analyses by the media which was all too much for him so it led to him taking time off and away from the sport.

Barry Hall was also seen to be suffering mental health problems, admitting he had been suffering depression throughout his AFL career and that he "had nothing to get out of bed for" (Hall, 2011). Simon Hogan was another player who came out about their depression and had contemplated killing himself during his career. Lance Picioane who played for Adelaide, Hawthorn and the Kangaroos said how he struggled to understand that he was actually suffering from depression and that it wasn't him just feeling a little bit down.

== Stressors and Causes ==
There are many stressors and demands in elite sport that can impact the mental health and wellbeing of athletes, including Players in the AFL. AFL and AFLW Players reported that financial pressure, including social pressures around spending and maintaining sense of belonging, and social media and public scrutiny were their biggest sources of stress

=== Pressures and expectations ===
Pressure to win and to perform well week in and week out can be a factor that impacts wellbeing and mental health for some AFL players. This is often found with younger players who are just starting to play at the elite level. AFL and AFLW Players are also often role models, and this can sometimes be a source of stress.

=== Injuries ===
Injury and the risk of injury can also influence mental health. Being injured also means they cannot exercise as much and this sudden drop in physical activity levels makes the player more likely to become anxious or depressed as physical activity is a mood enhancer. On average a total of 40 players miss a total of 142 games a season. The whole process of finding out about their injury to rehabilitation and returning to the sport can be an emotional roller-coaster for players, and it can be difficult to learn of the news, continue with rehab, and players can also have fear of reinjury when they return to sport.

=== Other ===
The pressure of location and relocation is another stressor for players, and can be especially hard for draftees who move away from home and their social support networks. When drafting comes around young players are unsure what team will draft them. Having to relocate their entire lives to go train and play with a team is such a stress on the young players and can cause anxiety. Starting in a new team with new people, a new training structure and lifestyle can be a big shock to some players and they may experience social anxiety and exclusion which could lead to negative thoughts.

During the week each player is critiqued by coaching staff to see where they can improve in their game, but constantly being under the pump can be mentally exhausting for players.

The environment in which they live and train in impacts a players mental health as it can affect the mental resilience which they build and creates their personality which could affect if they fit in or not.

== Prevention and treatment ==
In recent years, there has been growing focus on athlete mental health, with best practice from the scientific literature suggesting a need to protect and promote wellbeing across all levels of the sport system. The AFL Mental Health and Wellbeing strategy is informed by the best available evidence and includes pillars across prevention, promotion and response. In line with the response pillar, all AFL clubs have embedded psychologists. AFL Players are also able to access external mental health practitioners through the AFL Mental Health Referral Network and the AFLPA Mental Health Navigator Service.

The AFL hosted the inaugural Mental Health and Wellbeing Gathering at Gather Round 2026.

Held at Adelaide University and hosted by the AFL, in partnership with Danny Frawley Community, part of Black Dog Institute, the Gathering brought together sporting leaders from all 18 clubs, government, mental health experts, researchers and lived‑experience voices and members of the community on the important role that football plays in building community connection and positively impacting the mental fitness of Australians.

The Gathering demonstrated the impact of the AFL industry on mental health, that goes well beyond awareness raising. The Australian Rules football ecosystem is a wide-reaching system for the implementation of evidence based mental health literacy, resilience and social emotional wellbeing programs – delivered in partnership with mental health organisations and the AFL, Clubs and Associations.

https://www.afl.com.au/news/1493088/afl-industry-hosts-inaugural-mental-health-gathering-at-gather-round/amp

Movember Ahead of the Game Movember and the AFL are on a mission to improve the mental health of young people through footy. Ahead of the Game is a youth mental health program. It teaches players, parents, coaches, umpires and volunteers how to recognise mental health challenges, give and seek help, build mental fitness and resilience. Movember Ahead of the Game is rolling out across the nation

https://play.afl/movember-ahead-game

=== "Manage Your Mind" well-being program ===
This is a program set up by the AFL Players Association, teaching players about the signs and symptoms of mental illness so they can better understand the difference between feeling a bit sad one day and depression. Through a three session course players are exposed to realizing their own values, different mental health stories and how these both relate back to their lives and then being able to change anything they aren't happy with. They are also taught about different emotions and ways to surface them and talk about them to other people.

=== AFL Players Association programs ===
The AFL Players Association also have two other programs similar to the Manage Your Mind Well-being Program. Practical Mindfulness is another which is a hands on course that helps the players to be able to manage stress and build resilience to all the negative influences. Team wise is the third program they offer which is targeted at coaching staff, captains and influential players to develop skills in aiding other players to speak up and to be positive role models.

== Notable cases and people ==
=== Mitch Clark ===
Mitch Clark is one of the most publicised cases of depression amongst AFL athlete. Since being drafted to the Brisbane Lions at the age of 18, Mitch endured a string of injuries and illness, including battling Meningococcal disease prior to being drafted. From 2006- 2011, Mitch played a total of 82 games for Brisbane. Prior to the 2012 season, Mitch signed a lucrative 4-year deal with the Melbourne Demons Football Club, where he was handed the famous number 11 jersey which was worn by Melbourne legend, Jim Stynes. Mitch immediately felt the pressure of not only being one of the club's highest paid players, but also wearing a jumper number which had some much sentimental value to Melbourne fans. In his 2 years at Melbourne, Clark only managed to play 15 games. His career was again riddled by injury and prior to the 2014 season, Mitch retired from the AFL after battling depression which had hampered him for the previous 12 months. Clark was even granted indefinitely leave from Melbourne, however he could not continue to battle depression and play elite football. Prior to the 2015 season and after 12 months out of the game, Clark declared his desire to play top-level football again, and although still being a Melbourne listed player, he requested a trade to the Geelong Football Club. Clarks time thus far at Geelong has been much the same as the rest of his career, he has been struck down by injury and still battles depression on a daily basis. In a game early in the 2015 season, Mitch broke down mid match against Collingwood. It remains unclear what may have triggered this event, Mitch posted the following message on his Facebook account after the event- "Depression makes very little sense and rears its head whenever it chooses and unfortunately last night was one of those times. Like I have said I’m nowhere near ‘cured’ and am still learning how to best deal with my dark days. I'm very fortunate to have such great support around me and grateful for all the messages I have received. Please if you're struggling, reach out and ask for help. You're not alone #youareloved." In another game in 2015, against Hawthorn, it was alleged that Clark had been on the receiving end of several sledges from Hawthorn players over his mental issues. Hawthorn denied any such events occurred and the matter was not taken any further by the AFL or the Geelong Football Club.

=== Simon Hogan ===
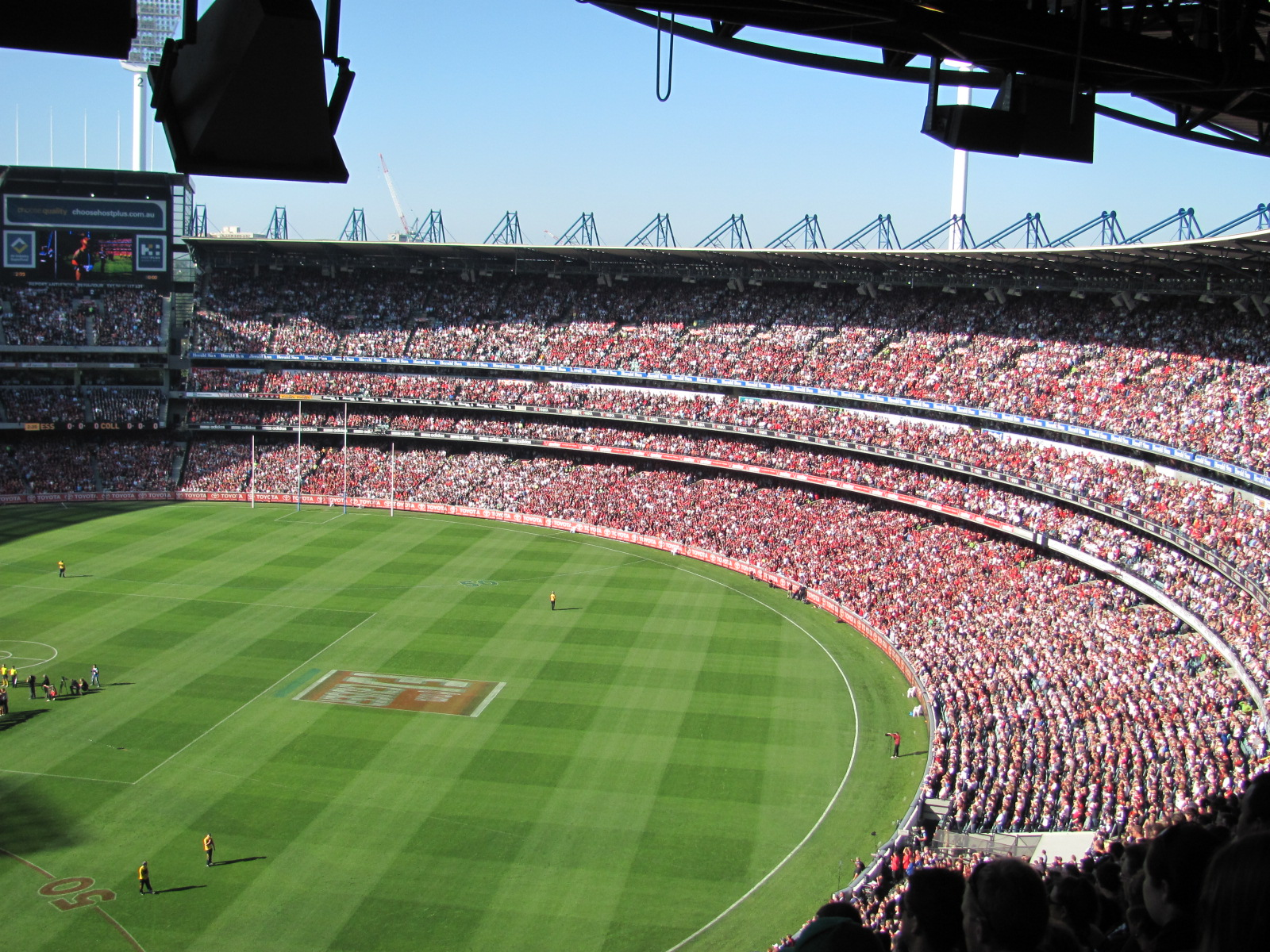
Spectators the Melbourne Cricket Ground watching a football game

Simon Hogan played 22 games for the Geelong Cats between 2009- 2011. He abruptly called a time on his career after being diagnosed with a depressive disorder which he feared would impact his relationship with his team mates over the stereotype of living the 'Match Man' lifestyle. At the depths of Hogan's issues he had suicidal thoughts, where he admits to holding sleeping tablets to his mouth a few times before he was interrupted by his father who happened to be home at the time. Hogan's biggest lifestyle adjustment was retiring from football, but he also had to make some other lifestyle changes as well. Hogan now wants to spend time to spread the awareness of depression amongst AFL players by telling his story. Hogan now spends his time studying whilst playing grassroots football on the weekends.

== Post-career occurrence ==
=== Heath Black ===
Heath Black's battle with depression and other mental health issues wasn't publicised until later in his football career. Black played 192 AFL games from 1997-2008, where he played for two AFL clubs. Black linked his condition with the fact that all he knew how to do was play football, in year 11 he couldn't spell or do basic maths, so when that was taken from him, he had nothing to do with his life. This led to alcohol issues and violence episodes which again fuelled his depressive state of mind. Heath Black released a book detailing his issues titled, "Hell and Black" as well as serving as a public and motivation speaker where he speaks on a range of topics ranging from how to deal with people with mental health issues to teamwork workshops.

=== Chris Mainwaring ===
Chris Mainwaring was a legend of the West Coast Eagles Football Club, he was also a sports reporter for Channel 7 in Perth. Mainwaring died in 2007 and it was revealed that he had a cocktail of both prescription and illicit drugs in his system. However, it was revealed in the days after Mainwaring's death, that Mainwaring had been battling depression after facing a lawsuit over a property deal went wrong. There had been several concerns over Mainwaring's health in the lead up to his death, with football figure Brad Hardie stating that "There have been concerns about Chris over the last couple of weeks now, Obviously things weren't totally together in his private life."

== See also ==
- Sport psychology
- Mental health in association football
- Depression in the Australian Football League
