= Jesse W. Smith =

Australian rules footballer

Jesse Smith

Personal information
- Full name: Jesse W. Smith
- Nicknames: JW, Boston
- Born: 29 September 1986 (age 40); Victoria, Australia
- Original team: Calder Cannons
- Draft: 47th overall (father/son), 2004; Kangaroos
- Height: 191 cm (6 ft 3 in)
- Weight: 83 kg (183 lb)
- Position: Half back / Midfielder

Playing career^{1}
| Years | Club | Games (Goals) |
| 2005–2009 | Kangaroos | 27 (3) |
| 2010 | St Kilda | 0 (0) |
| Total | | 27 (3) |
- ^{1} Playing statistics correct to the end of 2009.

Career highlights
- Larke Medal 2004; 2007 AFL Rising Star nominee

Jesse W. Smith (born 29 September 1986) is a former Australian rules footballer who played for St Kilda and North Melbourne in the Australian Football League (AFL). He is the son of former North Melbourne player, Ross Smith. Formerly playing for North Melbourne, he was drafted to play for St Kilda in 2010, and retired at the end of 2010.

== AFL career ==
=== North Melbourne ===
After being selected by North Melbourne under the father–son rule in the 2004 AFL draft, Smith made his debut during the 2004 AFL season. However, Smith struggled with injury throughout his entire career, missing all of the 2006 AFL season due to an ankle injury. He returned in 2007, earning a nomination for the AFL Rising Star after gathering 27 possessions in a game against Essendon. However, Smith was again limited by injuries during the 2008 season, playing only two games after suffering a series of hamstring injuries.

Smith managed just two games for North Melbourne's Victorian Football League (VFL) affiliate North Ballarat Football Club reserves in 2009 and re-injured his hamstring in the second of them. Frustrated with the Kangaroos' facilities, he knocked back a new contract and asked the club to trade him. After no trade was reached, he was delisted and started training with Hawthorn. On 26 November 2009, St Kilda drafted him with pick number 60 in the 2009 AFL draft.

In 2010 Smith played four games for St Kilda's VFL affiliate Sandringham Football Club and looked like a possible wildcard come finals time before breaking down with an ankle injury. Smith retired from the Saints at the end of 2010 because of his injury toll; it impacted his fitness, skills and game time. It was widely believed that after his last ankle injury, he would not be able to compete at AFL level.

== After retirement ==
As of 2012, Smith coordinates three-day junior sporting camps for Australian Sports Cadets.

== Honours and achievements ==
- AFL Rising Star nomination: 2007
- Larke Medal: 2004
