= Head injuries in the Australian Football League =

Head injuries in the Australian Football League (AFL) is a controversial topic with many players sustaining head related injuries during the AFL season, some of these being caused by the players themselves "ducking" their heads in order to receive high contact which warrants a free kick. One of the most common forms of head injury sustained in the AFL is concussion, which will affect about 6-7 players per team, per season. The reason head injuries are a big concern is that they relate to an increased probability to developing forms of cognitive impairment such as depression and dementia later in life.

== Physical injuries ==
During round 6 in the 2002 AFL season, James Hird suffered a facial injury after a collision with team mate Mark McVeigh during a match between Essendon and Fremantle which resulted in several bone fractures, Hird's injuries were compared to injuries seen in motor-car accidents. Jonathan Brown is another AFL player whose facial injuries were compared to those in a car accident; the three time award winner of the AFL's most courageous player, was injured after colliding with the knee of Fremantle's Luke McPharlin. Brown's injuries consisted of eight breaks around his eye socket, mandible, and cheek bone, which took hours of reconstructive surgery to repair.

== Mental injuries ==
Most of the severe mental injuries associated with AFL are developed later in life when the player has retired from the AFL; these injuries are a result of heavy contact to the player's head. From one hundred cases of concussion being reviewed, ninety seven of these involved direct contact to the head with majority of the contact coming from the head, upper body or upper limbs of the other player. Evidence suggests that some negative effects of concussion on cognitive and motor function may continue to harm the player many years after the initial injury; some research also links clinical depression to contact related concussion.

== Prevention ==
In recent years the AFL have taken many steps forward to try reduce the effects of concussion and how many players are receiving concussion, which will also reduce the physical head injuries to with less head contact. The AFL have modified rules of the game to protect the head of the player and reduce head contact during contests, and have also given out a concussion management plan. Prevention is also up to the player as well, for a player to comply with the concussion management plan they must miss the next game, but with players not registering as being concussed and playing the next week they can develop worse injuries.

== Notable people ==
Greg Williams, a former AFL player known for his attack on the football blames concussion on the football field as to why he's experiencing memory loss and also why he's developing a short temper. Chris Nowinski is a US concussions expert and states that he believes the AFL should do more to prevent players suffering head injuries which can lead to degenerate brain disease. Nowinski is an advocate for education about concussion being mandatory in sports codes, and believes some AFL players may already suffer from chronic traumatic encephalopathy.
