= Kepler Bradley =

Australian rules footballer

Personal information
- Full name: Kepler Daniel Bradley
- Born: 13 November 1985 (age 41)
- Original team: West Perth (WAFL)
- Draft: No. 6, 2003 National Draft, Essendon; No. 69, 2007 National Draft, Fremantle
- Height: 199 cm (6 ft 6 in)
- Weight: 103 kg (227 lb)
- Position: Forward

Playing career^{1}
| Years | Club | Games (Goals) |
| 2004–2007 | Essendon | 55 (14) |
| 2008–2014 | Fremantle | 68 (73) |
| Total | | 117 (87) |

International team honours
| Years | Team | Games (Goals) |
| 2005 | Australia | 2 |
- ^{1} Playing statistics correct to the end of 2014.

Career highlights
- 2003 Larke Medal; 2005 AFL Rising Star nominee; 2011 Fremantle leading goalkicker

Kepler Daniel Bradley (born 13 November 1985) is a former Australian rules footballer who played for the Essendon and Fremantle Football Clubs in the Australian Football League.

== Early career ==
Bradley played junior football with the Kingsley Junior Football Club and in 2003 he made his senior football debut for West Perth in the West Australian Football League (WAFL), playing five league games including the Grand Final which West Perth won. In that year he also represented Western Australia at the 2003 AFL Under 18 Championships, winning the Larke Medal as the best player at the championships. He also won the Jack Clarke Medal as the best player in the WAFL colts competition.

== Essendon career ==
Bradley was drafted early in the 2003 AFL draft, with Essendon's first selection at number 6 overall. He made his AFL debut in the first game of the 2004 season – Essendon's 96-point loss to Port Adelaide – and finished with 5 games in his debut year. Bradley has played as a forward, defender, wingman, ruckman and even ruck rover.

2005 saw Bradley mainly used in key defensive positions by coach Kevin Sheedy and he became a more permanent fixture in the side. In 2006 he was selected for all but one game. However, the first half of 2007 saw Bradley's opportunities limited to just two appearances, largely due to the recruiting of former Brisbane full-back Mal Michael and the meteoric rise of young Paddy Ryder, both playing key roles in the Essendon defence alongside veteran Dustin Fletcher, leaving little room for another tall player in the backline.

Bradley's fall from grace was put down by many to his crucial mistakes in the Anzac Day clash, where a risky kick across goal was intercepted by Tarkyn Lockyer, costing the Bombers a goal. After this match, his disposal skills were put under increased scrutiny and he only played two more games for Essendon.

Nevertheless, as a versatile player, he was prominent as a forward for the Bendigo Bombers, winning their best and fairest award and being their leading goalkicker.

== Fremantle career ==
At the end of the 2007 season Bradley was one of four players delisted after a deal to trade him to Fremantle Dockers was not able to be made during trade week.

He then returned to Western Australia and began training with the Dockers, who selected him with their 5th-round selection (69th overall) in the National Draft. He made his debut for Fremantle in Round 8 of 2008 in the Dockers 3-point loss to the Western Bulldogs at Subiaco Oval, where he collected 21 possessions and a goal. Kepler went on to become the club's leading goalscorer for the 2011 season, kicking 25 goals and eventually tying with Chris Mayne

In round 5 of the 2013 AFL season, Bradley was one of three AFL players to rupture the anterior cruciate ligament in their knee. Bradley's incident was unusual in that he was kicking the ball at the time and an opponent fell into his elevated leg, rather than the more usual twisting or landing incidents. He underwent a knee reconstruction and would miss the remainder of the season.

In August 2014, Bradley announced he would retire at the end of the 2014 season.

== Statistics ==
Legend
| G | Goals | K | Kicks | D | Disposals | T | Tackles |
| B | Behinds | H | Handballs | M | Marks | H/O | Hit-outs |

| Season | Team | No. | Games | Totals | | | | | | | | Averages (per game) | | | | | | | |
| Season | Team | No. | Games | G | B | K | H | D | M | T | H/O | G | B | K | H | D | M | T | H/O |
|---|---|---|---|---|---|---|---|---|---|---|---|---|---|---|---|---|---|---|---|
| 2004 | Essendon | 16 | 5 | 1 | 0 | 23 | 33 | 56 | 11 | 9 | 1 | 0.2 | 0.0 | 4.6 | 6.6 | 11.2 | 2.2 | 1.8 | 0.2 |
| 2005 | Essendon | 16 | 19 | 4 | 4 | 137 | 127 | 264 | 99 | 18 | 29 | 0.2 | 0.2 | 7.2 | 6.7 | 13.9 | 5.2 | 0.9 | 1.5 |
| 2006 | Essendon | 16 | 21 | 8 | 3 | 164 | 104 | 268 | 103 | 17 | 14 | 0.4 | 0.1 | 7.8 | 5.0 | 12.8 | 4.9 | 0.8 | 0.7 |
| 2007 | Essendon | 16 | 4 | 1 | 1 | 23 | 28 | 51 | 18 | 0 | 1 | 0.3 | 0.3 | 5.8 | 7.0 | 12.8 | 4.5 | 0.0 | 0.3 |
| 2008 | Fremantle | 26 | 9 | 12 | 2 | 84 | 59 | 143 | 45 | 3 | 25 | 1.3 | 0.2 | 9.3 | 6.6 | 15.9 | 5.0 | 0.3 | 2.8 |
| 2009 | Fremantle | 26 | 15 | 9 | 7 | 107 | 112 | 219 | 74 | 21 | 75 | 0.6 | 0.5 | 7.1 | 7.5 | 14.6 | 4.9 | 1.4 | 5.0 |
| 2010 | Fremantle | 26 | 12 | 14 | 8 | 94 | 122 | 216 | 66 | 15 | 73 | 1.2 | 0.7 | 7.8 | 10.2 | 18.0 | 5.5 | 1.3 | 6.1 |
| 2011 | Fremantle | 26 | 15 | 25 | 12 | 112 | 94 | 206 | 64 | 16 | 46 | 1.7 | 0.8 | 7.5 | 6.3 | 13.7 | 4.3 | 1.1 | 3.1 |
| 2012 | Fremantle | 26 | 12 | 6 | 13 | 94 | 79 | 173 | 52 | 16 | 64 | 0.5 | 1.1 | 7.8 | 6.6 | 14.4 | 4.3 | 1.3 | 5.3 |
| 2013 | Fremantle | 26 | 5 | 7 | 2 | 33 | 18 | 51 | 13 | 5 | 21 | 1.4 | 0.4 | 6.6 | 3.6 | 10.2 | 2.6 | 1.0 | 4.2 |
| 2014 | Fremantle | 26 | 0 | — | — | — | — | — | — | — | — | — | — | — | — | — | — | — | — |
| Career | | | 117 | 87 | 52 | 871 | 776 | 1647 | 545 | 120 | 349 | 0.7 | 0.4 | 7.4 | 6.6 | 14.1 | 4.7 | 1.0 | 3.0 |
