= Callum Urch =

Australian rules footballer (born 1984)

Personal information
- Born: 21 July 1984 (age 42)
- Original team: Spotswood/Western U18s
- Debut: Round 19, 7 August 2004, Kangaroos vs. Sydney, at S.C.G.
- Height: 184 cm (6 ft 0 in)
- Weight: 89 kg (196 lb)

Playing career^{1}
Years	Club	Games (Goals)
2004–2006	Kangaroos	8 (1)
- ^{1} Playing statistics correct to the end of 2006.

Callum Urch (born 21 July 1984) is an Australian rules footballer who played for the Kangaroos in the Australian Football League.

After attending Caroline Chisholm Catholic College in Braybrook, Urch made his debut against the Sydney Swans in Round 19 at the Sydney Cricket Ground in 2004. He was part of the 40 point 3-quarter time deficit revival that saw the Kangaroos come back in Glenn Archer's 250th game to win against the odds.

After playing just the 8 games over three years, and no games in 2007, he was delisted from the Kangaroos list at the end of the 2007 AFL season. He was then recruited by Victorian Football League club Williamstown, before moving to Darley in the Ballarat Football League in 2009.

In April 2013 Urch was arrested and charged with cocaine trafficking charges after a police investigation into waterfront corruption.
