= Tom Davidson =

Australian rules footballer

Personal information
- Full name: Tom Davidson
- Born: 3 February 1983 (age 43)
- Original team: Geelong Falcons
- Draft: 27th overall, 2001 National Draft; 8th overall, 2006 Rookie Draft
- Height: 192 cm (6 ft 4 in)
- Weight: 87 kg (192 lb)
- Position: Forward

Playing career^{1}
Years	Club	Games (Goals)
2002–2005	Collingwood	1 (0)
2006	Western Bulldogs	0 (0)
- ^{1} Playing statistics correct to the end of 2004.

Tom Davidson (born 3 February 1983) is a former Australian rules footballer who was recruited from the Geelong Falcons in the 2001 AFL draft by the Collingwood Football Club.

His career was hindered by two serious knee injuries, the first during the 2003 preseason, and the second in his first and only Australian Football League (AFL) game in April 2004. He was delisted by Collingwood at the end of the 2005 season, but drafted by in the 2006 rookie draft by the Western Bulldogs, but never again played senior football.

He is the son of former Richmond and Geelong footballer Garry Davidson.

Davidson currently owns and runs Patch Cafe in Richmond.
