= List of Geelong Football Club seasons =

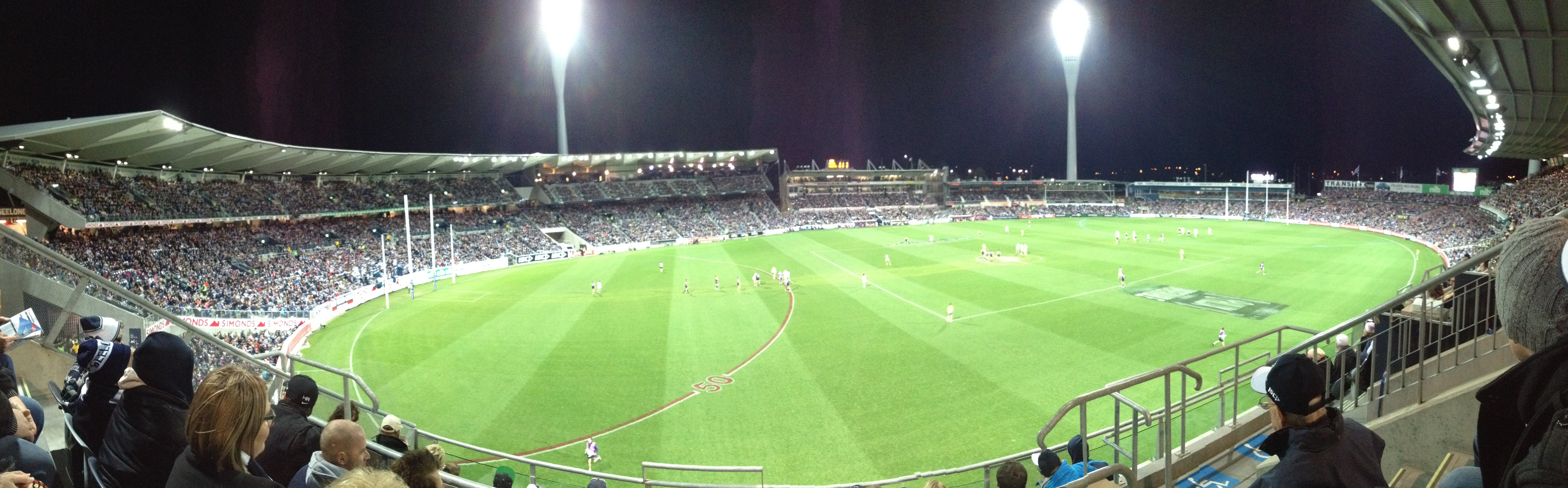
GMHBA Stadium, the current home stadium of the Geelong Football Club.

The Geelong Football Club is an Australian rules football club based in Geelong, Victoria. Since becoming a foundation club of the Victorian Football League (VFL)—which is now known as the Australian Football League (AFL)—in 1897, the club has participated in every season of the competition except the 1916, 1942 and 1943 seasons, where the club did not field teams due to World War I (1916) and World War II (1942 and 1943). In 126 completed seasons, Geelong has contested 19 VFL/AFL Grand Finals, winning 10 premierships, most recently in 2022.

== Pre-VFA matches (1860–1876) ==
Before the formation of the Victorian Football Association (VFA) in 1877 matches between clubs were organised on an ad hoc basis. Since its founding in 1859, the Geelong Football Club had been involved in matches between other provincial Victorian clubs, as well as the clubs formed in the metropolitan Melbourne area. The club contested its first interclub match against the Melbourne Football Club at Argyle Square in 1860, which finished as a scoreless draw. The two clubs fostered a strong early rivalry. Newspapers of the time would occasionally report on matches played by the club, with the Geelong Advertiser proclaiming in 1862 "last season Geelong footballers had the honour of defeating successively the three crack metropolitan clubs, much to the surprise of the latter."

The club competed for a number of challenge cups during the 1860s, permanently claiming the Caledonian Society Challenge Cup in 1864 after holding on the cup following a number of challenge matches.

During the 1867 season, Geelong would play the Carlton Football Club for the first time at the Argyle Ground, with the club earning a tight victory. A return match was played between the clubs the following year at Royal Park in Melbourne, with Geelong denied what they had considered a fair goal to see the match ending in a contentious draw. The two clubs would meet again the following year, while one of the founders of the club H. C. A. Harrison would line up against Geelong for Melbourne in a drawn match in 1869.

In 1873 the club would play a number of matches against metropolitan and provincial clubs, including three matches against the junior Kardinia Football Club.

At the start of the 1874 season, the club was the acknowledged holders of the "Geelong, Ballarat and Western District Challenge Cup" (GBWD Challenge Cup) and were subject to a number of challenge matches. Geelong would defend the cup twice against Kardinia, and twice against West End, also defeating Ballarat and Ballarat Phoenix (a match in which the club kicked their highest number of goals in a match with nine). The club also playing the first two notable matches against the St Kilda Football Club. Geelong would end the 1874 season with seven wins, three losses and two draws from matches reported on by the Geelong Advertiser.

During the 1875 season, Geelong would defend the GBWD Challenge Cup against Ballarat, Kardinia, and Corio Extended. In June, a second squad would play a match against the Barwon Football Club for the first time, with the two clubs first squads meeting for the first time to battle for the GBWD Challenge Cup on 10 July 1875. That match would end as a draw, as would a rematch on 14 August. Geelong were able to further defend the GBWD Challenge Cup with second wins against Corio Extended, and Kardinia, but suffered defeat against Carlton who were the premier metropolitan club.

A third 1875 match between Geelong and Barwon ended in controversy when the match was abandoned after Barwon supporters rushed onto the field after a decision by umpire Tom Wills who had deep connections with the Geelong club. Geelong claimed permanent ownership of the GBWD Challenge Cup a few weeks later following successful matches against Albion (the premier club from Ballarat), and for a second time against Ballarat.

A new Western Districts Challenge Cup was instituted by Thomas Wills ahead of the 1876 season. Geelong would win the first meeting against Barwon on 17 June, but lost the Cup on 29 July to Barwon in a contentious match with the club vowing never to play against their local rivals again. That loss was one of six for the season.

By 1877, while the system of organising matches was still up the secretaries of each club, the rules had been standardised by the VFA. In 1877 Geelong were acknowledged as one of the strongest provincial clubs, although local rivals Barwon in just their fourth season would take that title despite not coming to an agreement to play against Geelong.

Geelong's noted record by season
Season	Wins	Losses	Draws	Captain	Ref.
1874	12	3	1	G.G. Day	Ref.
1875	9	2	3	G.G. Day	
1876	3	6	3	O. Thomas	

== VFA (1877–1896) ==
Geelong's VFA record by season
Season	League	Wins	Losses	Draws	Result	Captain	Ref.
1877	VFA (1)	5	2	1	Did not place	G.A. Down	Ref.
1878	VFA (2)	16	0	1	Premiers (1)	A.A. Austin	
1879	VFA (3)	15	0	1	Premiers (2)	James Wilson	
1880	VFA (4)	14	2	2	Premiers (3)	James Wilson	
1881	VFA (5)	15	1	2	Runners-up (1)	James Wilson	
1882	VFA (6)	20	2	2	Premiers (4)	James Wilson	
1883	VFA (7)	15	3	3	Premiers (5)	Charles Brownlow	
1884	VFA (8)	22	2	1	Premiers (6)	Charles Brownlow; Harry Steedman	
1885	VFA (9)	12	4	5	3rd	Hugh McLean	
1886	VFA (10)	23	0	2	Premiers (7)	David Hickinbotham	
1887	VFA (11)	16	2	3	Runners-up (2)	R. Talbot	
1888	VFA (12)	12	3	4	Runners-up (3)	David Hickinbotham	
1889	VFA (13)	10	6	4	5th	David Hickinbotham	
1890	VFA (14)	9	8	2	7th	J. Baker	
1891	VFA (15)	12	7	0	5th	T. Parkin	
1892	VFA (16)	12	4	2	3rd	R. Houston	
1893	VFA (17)	14	4	2	3rd	R. Houston	
1894	VFA (18)	9	7	2	7th	R. Houston	
1895	VFA (19)	13	5	0	Runners-up (equal) (4)	Jim McShane	
1896	VFA (20)	4	11	3	11th	Peter Burns	

== VFL/AFL (1897–present) ==
Table key
‡	Finished the home and away season in first position (minor premiers)
†	Finished the home and away season in last position (wooden spoon)
Premiers	Won the VFL/AFL premiership in the Grand Final (Note: No Grand Final was held in 1897. The premier was determined from the results of a round-robin tournament.)
Runners-up	Lost the Grand Final
PF	Did not progress past the preliminary finals
SF	Did not progress past the semi-finals
SR	Did not progress past the sectional rounds in the finals (used between 1898 and 1900)
QF	Did not progress past the qualifying finals
EF	Did not progress past the elimination finals
DNQ	Did not qualify for finals
^	Denotes captain-coach
+	Joint winner

Geelong's VFL/AFL record by season
Season	League	Home and away results				Finals results (Note: The VFL/AFL has used twelve different finals tournament systems in its history. The current AFL final eight system has been used since 2000.)	Coach	Captain	Best and fairest	Leading goalkicker	Ref.
Season	League	Ladder	W	L	D	Finals results	Coach	Captain	Best and fairest	Leading goalkicker	Ref.
1897	VFL (1)	1st^{‡}	11	3	0	Runners-up (1)	None	Jack Conway	Joe McShane	Eddy James	
1898	VFL (2)	4th	9	5	0	SR	None	Jack Conway	Unknown	Eddy James (2)	
1899	VFL (3)	2nd	10	4	0	SR	None	Jack Conway	Unknown	Eddy James (3)	
1900	VFL (4)	2nd	9	5	0	SR	None	Peter Burns	Unknown	Teddy Lockwood	
1901	VFL (5)	1st^{‡}	14	3	0	SF	None	Henry Young	Unknown	Charles Coles	
1902	VFL (6)	7th	7	10	0	DNQ	None	Henry Young	Unknown	Ike Woods	
1903	VFL (7)	4th	9	8	0	SF	None	Henry Young	Teddy Rankin	Ike Woods (2)	
1904	VFL (8)	7th	4	12	1	DNQ	None	Henry Young	Unknown	Ike Woods (3)	
1905	VFL (9)	6th	6	11	0	DNQ	None	Henry Young	Henry Young	Ike Woods (4)	
1906	VFL (10)	7th	5	12	0	DNQ	None	Henry Young	Henry Young (2)	Les Roebuck	
1907	VFL (11)	6th	7	10	0	DNQ	None	Henry Young	Unknown	Tom Sherry	
1908	VFL (12)	10th^{†}	2	16	0	DNQ	None	Henry Young	Unknown	Tom Hardiman	
1909	VFL (13)	9th	3	15	0	DNQ	None	Henry Young	Unknown	Percy Martini	
1910	VFL (14)	5th	10	7	1	DNQ	David Hickinbotham	Bill Eason	Dick Grigg	Percy Martini (2)	
1911	VFL (15)	6th	8	9	1	DNQ	David Hickinbotham	Bill Eason	Dick Grigg (2)	Percy Martini (3)	
1912	VFL (16)	4th	11	7	0	SF	Bill Eason^		Dick Grigg (3)	Percy Martini (4)	
1913	VFL (17)	5th	10	8	0	DNQ	Bill Eason^		Unknown	Percy Martini (5)	
1914	VFL (18)	4th	11	6	1	SF	Billy Orchard^		Dick Grigg (4)	Percy Martini (6)	
1915	VFL (19)	9th^{†}	3	13	0	DNQ	None	Billy Orchard	Alec Eason	Tom Brownlees	
1916	Did not participate (Note: The club did not participate in the 1916 VFL season due to World War I.)										
1917	VFL (20)	5th	6	9	0	DNQ	None	Harry Marsham	Bert Rankin	Percy Martini (7)	
1918	VFL (21)	7th	3	11	0	DNQ	None	Jim Kearney	Unknown	Percy Martini (8)	
1919	VFL (22)	8th	3	12	1	DNQ	None	Alec Eason; Jim Kearney	Unknown	Percy Martini (9)	
1920	VFL (23)	7th	5	11	0	DNQ	Alec Eason^		Jockie Jones	Cliff Rankin	
1921	VFL (24)	4th	9	7	0	SF	Bert Taylor	Harold Craven	Billy McCarter	Cliff Rankin (2)	
1922	VFL (25)	8th	5	11	0	DNQ	None	Harold Craven	Keith Johns	Cliff Rankin (3)	
1923	VFL (26)	4th	9	7	0	SF	Bert Taylor	Bert Rankin	Billy McCarter (2)	Cliff Rankin (4)	
1924	VFL (27)	5th	8	8	0	DNQ	Lloyd Hagger^		Unknown	Lloyd Hagger	
1925	VFL (28)	1st^{‡}	15	2	0	Premiers (1)	Cliff Rankin^		Unknown	Lloyd Hagger (2)	
1926	VFL (29)	2nd	15	3	0	SF	Cliff Rankin^		Unknown	Lloyd Hagger (3)	
1927	VFL (30)	3rd	14	4	0	SF	Cliff Rankin^		George Todd	Lloyd Hagger (4)	
1928	VFL (31)	9th	6	12	0	DNQ	Tom Fitzmaurice^		Reg Hickey	Jack Chambers	
1929	VFL (32)	7th	8	10	0	DNQ	Arthur Coghlan^		Jack Williams	Jack Plunkett	
1930	VFL (33)	4th	11	7	0	Runners-up (2)	Arthur Coghlan^		George Todd (2)	Bill Kuhlken	
1931	VFL (34)	1st^{‡}	15	3	0	Premiers (2)	Charlie Clymo	Ted Baker	George Todd (3)	George Moloney	
1932	VFL (35)	5th	11	6	1	DNQ	Reg Hickey^		George Moloney	George Moloney (2)	
1933	VFL (36)	4th	12	6	0	PF	Arthur Coghlan	Reg Hickey	Les Hardiman	George Moloney (3)	
1934	VFL (37)	2nd	14	3	1	PF	Arthur Coghlan	Reg Hickey	Reg Hickey (2)	Jack Metherell	
1935	VFL (38)	9th	6	11	1	DNQ	Percy Parratt	Reg Hickey	Fred Hawking	Jack Evans	
1936	VFL (39)	5th	11	7	0	DNQ	Charlie Dibbs^ Reg Hickey^		Tom Quinn	Jack Metherell (2)	
1937	VFL (40)	1st^{‡}	15	3	0	Premiers (3)	Reg Hickey^		Tom Quinn (2)	Jack Metherell (3)	
1938	VFL (41)	2nd	13	5	0	PF	Reg Hickey^		Tom Arklay	Clyde Helmer	
1939	VFL (42)	7th	7	11	0	DNQ	Reg Hickey^		Leo Dean^{+}	Norm Glenister	
1939	VFL (42)	7th	7	11	0	DNQ	Reg Hickey^		Jack Grant^{+}	Norm Glenister	
1940	VFL (43)	4th	11	7	0	SF	Reg Hickey^		Tom Arklay (2)	Jack Grant	
1941	VFL (44)	10th	3	15	0	DNQ	Len Metherell	Tom Arklay	Jim Knight	Lindsay White	
1942	Did not participate (Note: The club did not participate in the 1942 and 1943 VFL seasons due to World War II.)										
1943	Did not participate										
1944	VFL (45)	12th^{†}	1	17	0	DNQ	Tom Arklay	Jack Butcher	Jim Munday	Lindsay White (2)	
1945	VFL (46)	11th	2	18	0	DNQ	Jack Williams	Jack Butcher; Lindsay White	Jim Fitzgerald	Vic Nankervis	
1946	VFL (47)	10th	4	15	0	DNQ	Tommy Quinn	Jack Grant	Geoff Mahon	Russell Renfrey	
1947	VFL (48)	7th	11	8	0	DNQ	Tommy Quinn	George Gniel	Lindsay White	Lindsay White (3)	
1948	VFL (49)	9th	7	12	0	DNQ	Tommy Quinn	Lindsay White	Bruce Morrison	Lindsay White (8)	
1949	1949 (50)	8th	9	10	0	DNQ	Reg Hickey	Jim Fitzgerald; Tom Morrow	Fred Flanagan	Lindsay White (9)	
1950	VFL (51)	4th	10	8	0	PF	Reg Hickey	Bernie Smith; Lindsay White	John Hyde	George Goninon	
1951	VFL (52)	1st^{‡}	14	4	0	Premiers (4)	Reg Hickey	Fred Flanagan	Bernie Smith	George Goninon (2)	
1952	VFL (53)	1st^{‡}	16	2	1	Premiers (5)	Reg Hickey	Fred Flanagan	Geoff Williams	George Goninon (3)	
1953	VFL (54)	1st^{‡}	15	3	0	Runners-up (3)	Reg Hickey	Fred Flanagan	Peter Pianto	George Goninon (4)	
1954	VFL (55)	1st^{‡}	13	5	0	PF	Reg Hickey	Bernie Smith	Norm Sharp	Fred Flanagan	
1955	VFL (56)	3rd	14	4	0	PF	Reg Hickey	Bob Davis	Geoff Williams (2)	Noel Rayson	
1956	VFL (57)	3rd	13	5	0	SF	Reg Hickey	Bob Davis	Bernie Smith (2)	Noel Rayson (2)	
1957	VFL (58)	12th^{†}	5	12	1	DNQ	Reg Hickey	Bob Davis	Bob Davis	Fred Wooller	
1958	VFL (59)	12th^{†}	4	14	0	DNQ	Reg Hickey	Bob Davis	John O'Neill	Neil Trezise	
1959	VFL (60)	10th	5	13	0	DNQ	Reg Hickey	Neil Trezise	Colin Rice	Fred Wooller (2)	
1960	VFL (61)	9th	6	11	1	DNQ	Bob Davis	Ron Hovey; Colin Rice	Fred Wooller	Fred Wooller (3)	
1961	VFL (62)	9th	10	7	1	DNQ	Bob Davis	John Yeates	Roy West	Doug Wade	
1962	VFL (63)	2nd	14	4	0	PF replay	Bob Davis	John Yeates	Alistair Lord	Doug Wade (2)	
1963	VFL (64)	2nd	13	4	1	Premiers (6)	Bob Davis	Fred Wooller	Graham Farmer	Doug Wade (3)	
1964	VFL (65)	4th	13	4	1	PF	Bob Davis	Fred Wooller	Graham Farmer (2)	Doug Wade (4)	
1965	VFL (66)	3rd	13	5	0	SF	Bob Davis	Graham Farmer	Peter Walker	Gareth Andrews	
1966	VFL (67)	3rd	14	4	0	SF	Peter Pianto	Graham Farmer	Denis Marshall	Doug Wade (5)	
1967	VFL (68)	3rd	13	5	0	Runners-up (4)	Peter Pianto	Graham Farmer	Bill Goggin	Doug Wade (6)	
1968	VFL (69)	3rd	15	5	0	PF	Peter Pianto	Bill Goggin	John Newman	Doug Wade (7)	
1969	VFL (70)	3rd	13	6	1	SF	Peter Pianto	Bill Goggin	Doug Wade	Doug Wade (8)	
1970	VFL (71)	5th	12	10	0	DNQ	Peter Pianto	Bill Goggin	Bill Goggin (2)	Doug Wade (9)	
1971	VFL (72)	10th	5	17	0	DNQ	Bill McMaster	Bill Goggin	David Clarke	Doug Wade (10)	
1972	VFL (73)	10th	7	15	0	DNQ	Bill McMaster	Doug Wade	Ian Nankervis	Doug Wade (11)	
1973	VFL (74)	11th	6	16	0	DNQ	Graham Farmer	Geoff Ainsworth	Bruce Nankervis	David Clarke	
1974	VFL (75)	6th	11	11	0	DNQ	Graham Farmer	John Newman	Bruce Nankervis (2)	Paul Sarah	
1975	VFL (76)	11th	7	15	0	DNQ	Graham Farmer	John Newman	John Newman (2)	Larry Donohue^{+}	
1975	VFL (76)	11th	7	15	0	DNQ	Graham Farmer	John Newman	John Newman (2)	Ian Nankervis^{+}	
1976	VFL (77)	4th	12	10	0	SF	Rodney Olsson	Bruce Nankervis	Ian Nankervis (2)	Larry Donohue (2)	
1977	VFL (78)	8th	8	14	0	DNQ	Rodney Olsson	Bruce Nankervis	Ian Nankervis (3)	Larry Donohue (3)	
1978	VFL (79)	5th	12	10	0	EF	Rodney Olsson	Ian Nankervis	David Clarke (2)	Larry Donohue (4)	
1979	VFL (80)	6th	12	10	0	DNQ	Rodney Olsson	Ian Nankervis	David Clarke (3)	David Clarke (2)	
1980	VFL (81)	1st^{‡}	17	5	0	PF	Bill Goggin	Ian Nankervis	Rod Blake	Terry Bright	
1981	VFL (82)	3rd	16	6	0	PF	Bill Goggin	Ian Nankervis	Peter Featherby	Terry Bright (2)	
1982	VFL (83)	9th	7	15	0	DNQ	Bill Goggin	Brian Peake	John Mossop	Michael Turner	
1983	VFL (84)	9th	8	14	0	DNQ	Tom Hafey	Ian Nankervis	Ray Card	Terry Bright (3)	
1984	VFL (85)	6th	11	11	0	DNQ	Tom Hafey	Michael Turner	Gary Ablett Sr.	Mark Jackson	
1985	VFL (86)	6th	12	10	0	DNQ	Tom Hafey	Michael Turner	Greg Williams	Gary Ablett, Sr.	
1986	VFL (87)	9th	7	15	0	DNQ	John Devine	Michael Turner	Paul Couch	Gary Ablett, Sr. (2)	
1987	VFL (88)	6th	11	10	1	DNQ	John Devine	Damian Bourke	Mark Bos	Bruce Lindner	
1988	VFL (89)	9th	10	12	0	DNQ	John Devine	Damian Bourke	Mark Bos (2)	Gary Ablett, Sr. (3)	
1989	VFL (90)	3rd	16	6	0	Runners-up (5)	Malcolm Blight	Damian Bourke	Paul Couch (2)	Gary Ablett, Sr. (4)	
1990	AFL (91)	10th	8	14	0	DNQ	Malcolm Blight	Andrew Bews	Barry Stoneham	Gary Ablett, Sr. (5)	
1991	AFL (92)	3rd	16	6	0	PF	Malcolm Blight	Andrew Bews	Garry Hocking	Billy Brownless	
1992	AFL (93)	1st^{‡}	16	6	0	Runners-up (6)	Malcolm Blight	Mark Bairstow	Ken Hinkley	Billy Brownless (2)	
1993	AFL (94)	7th	12	8	0	DNQ	Malcolm Blight	Mark Bairstow	Garry Hocking (2)	Gary Ablett, Sr. (6)	
1994	AFL (95)	4th	13	9	0	Runners-up (7)	Malcolm Blight	Mark Bairstow	Garry Hocking (3)	Gary Ablett, Sr. (7)	
1995	AFL (96)	2nd	16	6	0	Runners-up (8)	Gary Ayres	Gary Ablett Sr. Ken Hinkley; Garry Hocking; Barry Stoneham	Paul Couch (3)	Gary Ablett, Sr. (8)	
1996	AFL (97)	7th	13	8	1	QF	Gary Ayres	Gary Ablett, Sr. Barry Stoneham	Garry Hocking (4)	Gary Ablett, Sr. (9)	
1997	AFL (98)	2nd	15	7	0	SF	Gary Ayres	Barry Stoneham	Liam Pickering	Ronnie Burns	
1998	AFL (99)	12th	9	13	0	DNQ	Gary Ayres	Barry Stoneham	Peter Riccardi	Ronnie Burns^{+} (2)	
1998	AFL (99)	12th	9	13	0	DNQ	Gary Ayres	Barry Stoneham	Peter Riccardi	Brett Spinks^{+}	
1999	AFL (100)	11th	10	12	0	DNQ	Gary Ayres	Leigh Colbert; Garry Hocking	Ben Graham	Ronnie Burns (3)	
2000	AFL (101)	5th	12	9	1	EF	Mark Thompson	Ben Graham	Steven King	Ronnie Burns^{+} (4)	
2000	AFL (101)	5th	12	9	1	EF	Mark Thompson	Ben Graham	Steven King	David Mensch^{+}	
2001	AFL (102)	12th	9	13	0	DNQ	Mark Thompson	Ben Graham	Brenton Sanderson	Ronnie Burns^{+} (5)	
2001	AFL (102)	12th	9	13	0	DNQ	Mark Thompson	Ben Graham	Brenton Sanderson	Ben Graham^{+}	
2002	AFL (103)	9th	11	11	0	DNQ	Mark Thompson	Ben Graham	Steven King (2)	Kent Kingsley	
2003	AFL (104)	12th	7	14	1	DNQ	Mark Thompson	Steven King	Matthew Scarlett	Kent Kingsley	
2004	AFL (105)	4th	15	7	0	PF	Mark Thompson	Steven King	Cameron Ling	Kent Kingsley	
2005	AFL (106)	6th	12	10	0	SF	Mark Thompson	Steven King	Joel Corey	Kent Kingsley	
2006	AFL (107)	10th	10	11	1	DNQ	Mark Thompson	Steven King	Paul Chapman	Gary Ablett, Jr.	
2007	AFL (108)	1st^{‡}	18	4	0	Premiers (7)	Mark Thompson	Tom Harley	Gary Ablett Jr.	Cameron Mooney	
2008	AFL (109)	1st^{‡}	21	1	0	Runners-up (9)	Mark Thompson	Tom Harley	Joel Corey (2)	Steve Johnson	
2009	AFL (110)	2nd	18	4	0	Premiers (8)	Mark Thompson	Tom Harley	Gary Ablett Jr.^{+} (2)	Cameron Mooney (2)	
2009	AFL (110)	2nd	18	4	0	Premiers (8)	Mark Thompson	Tom Harley	Corey Enright^{+}	Cameron Mooney (2)	
2010	AFL (111)	2nd	17	5	0	PF	Mark Thompson	Cameron Ling	Joel Selwood	Steve Johnson	
2011	AFL (112)	2nd	19	3	0	Premiers (9)	Chris Scott	Cameron Ling	Corey Enright (2)	James Podsiadly	
2012	AFL (113)	6th	15	7	0	EF	Chris Scott	Joel Selwood	Tom Hawkins	Tom Hawkins	
2013	AFL (114)	2nd	18	4	0	PF	Chris Scott	Joel Selwood	Joel Selwood (2)	Tom Hawkins (2)	
2014	AFL (115)	3rd	17	5	0	SF	Chris Scott	Joel Selwood	Joel Selwood (3)	Tom Hawkins (3)	
2015	AFL (116)	10th	11	9	1	DNQ	Chris Scott	Joel Selwood	Mark Blicavs	Tom Hawkins (4)	
2016	AFL (117)	2nd	17	5	0	PF	Chris Scott	Joel Selwood	Patrick Dangerfield	Tom Hawkins (5)	
2017	AFL (118)	2nd	15	6	1	PF	Chris Scott	Joel Selwood	Patrick Dangerfield (2)	Tom Hawkins (6)	
2018	AFL (119)	8th	13	9	0	EF	Chris Scott	Joel Selwood	Mark Blicavs (2)	Tom Hawkins (7)	
2019	AFL (120)	1st^{‡}	16	6	0	PF	Chris Scott	Joel Selwood	Patrick Dangerfield (3)	Tom Hawkins (8)	
2020	AFL (121)	4th	12	5	0	Runners-up (10)	Chris Scott	Joel Selwood	Cameron Guthrie	Tom Hawkins (9)	
2021	AFL (122)	3rd	16	6	0	PF	Chris Scott	Joel Selwood	Tom Stewart	Tom Hawkins (10)	
2022	AFL (123)	1st^{‡}	18	4	0	Premiers (10)	Chris Scott	Joel Selwood	Jeremy Cameron^{+}	Tom Hawkins (11)	
2022	AFL (123)	1st^{‡}	18	4	0	Premiers (10)	Chris Scott	Joel Selwood	Cameron Guthrie^{+} (2)	Tom Hawkins (11)	
2023	AFL (124)	12th	10	12	1	DNQ	Chris Scott	Patrick Dangerfield	Tom Stewart (2)	Jeremy Cameron	
2024	AFL (125)	3rd	15	8	0	PF	Chris Scott	Patrick Dangerfield	Max Holmes	Jeremy Cameron (2)	
2025	AFL (126)	2nd	17	6	0	Runners-up (11)	Chris Scott	Patrick Dangerfield	Max Holmes (2)	Jeremy Cameron (3)	
2026	AFL (127)	5th	15	8	0	SF	Chris Scott	Patrick Dangerfield	Bailey Smith	Shannon Neale	
