= List of Geelong Football Club captains =

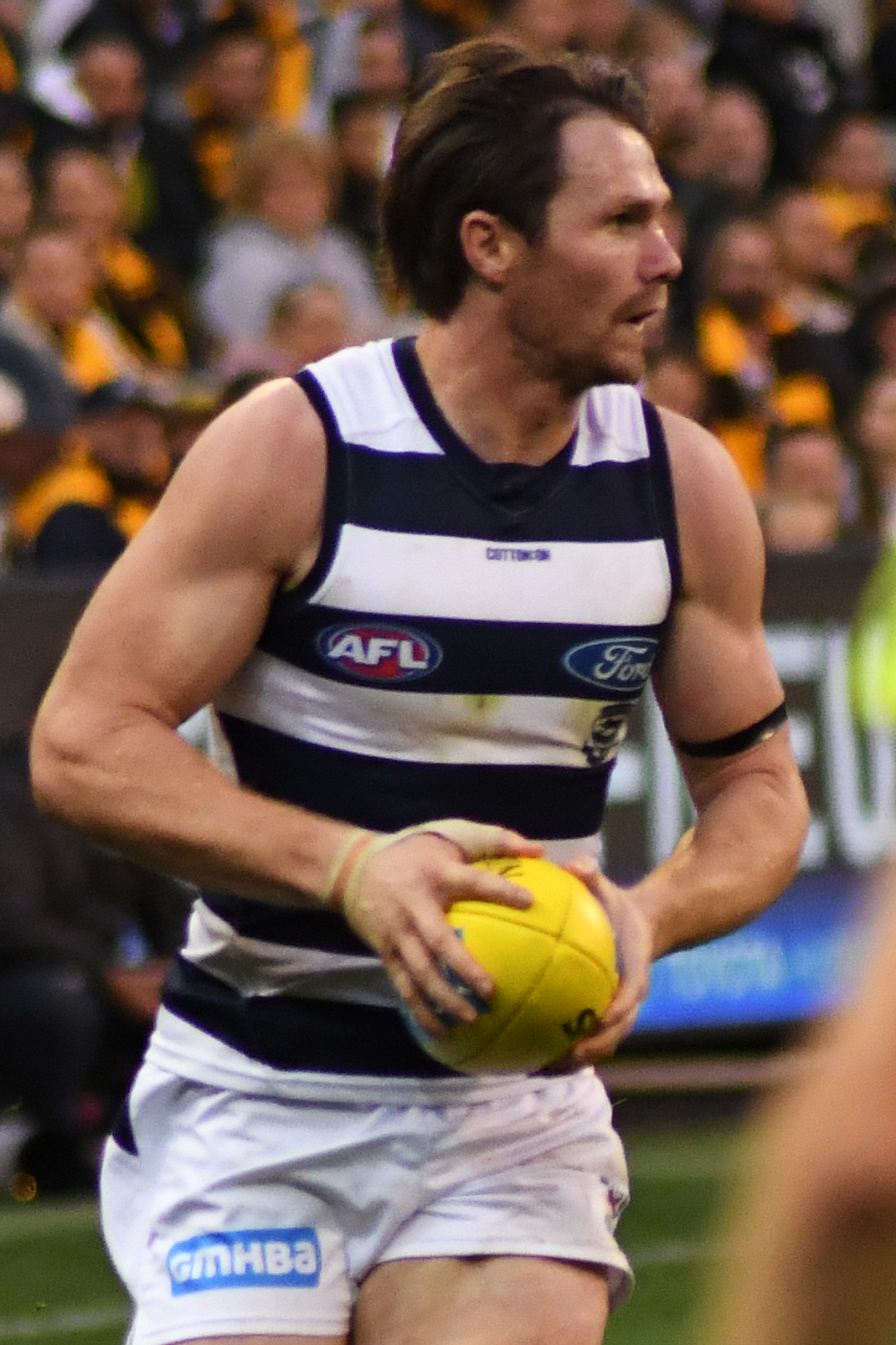
Patrick Dangerfield (pictured here in 2019) is the current captain of Geelong

This is a list of all captains of the Geelong Football Club, an Australian rules football club in the Australian Football League.

== VFA ==
Geelong Football Club captains
#	Name	Years
1	G.A. Down	1877
2	A.A. Austin	1878
3	James Wilson	1879–1882
4	Charles "Chas" Brownlow	1883–1884
5	Harry Steedman	1884
6	Hugh McLean	1885
7	David Hickinbotham	1886, 1888–1889
8	R. Talbot	1887
9	J. Baker	1890
10	T. Parkin	1891
11	R. Houston	1892–1894
12	Jim McShane	1895
13	Peter Burns	1896

== VFL/AFL ==
Geelong Football Club captains
#	Name	Years
1	Jack Conway	1897–1899
2	Peter Burns	1900
3	Henry Young	1901–1909
4	Bill Eason	1910–1913
5	Billy Orchard	1914–1915
Club recess due to World War I (1916)
6	Harry Marsham	1917
7	Jim Kearney	1918–1919
8	Alec Eason	1919–1920
9	Harold Craven	1921–1922
10	Bert Rankin	1923
11	Lloyd Hagger	1924
12	Cliff Rankin	1925–1927
13	Tom Fitzmaurice	1928
14	Arthur Coghlan	1929–1930
15	Ted Baker	1931
16	Reg Hickey	1932–1940
17	Tom Arklay	1941
Club recess due to World War II (1942–1943)
18	Jack Butcher	1944–1945
19	Lindsay White	1945, 1948, 1950
20	Jack Grant	1946
21	George Gniel	1947
22	Jim Fitzgerald	1949
23	Tom Morrow	1949
24	Bernie Smith	1950, 1954
25	Fred Flanagan	1951–1954
26	Bob Davis	1955–1958
27	Neil Trezise	1959
28	Ron Hovey	1960
29	Colin Rice	1960
30	John Yeates	1961–1962
31	Fred Wooller	1963–1964
32	Graham Farmer	1965–1967
33	Bill Goggin	1968–1971
34	Doug Wade	1972
35	Geoff Ainsworth	1973
36	John "Sam" Newman	1974–1975
37	Bruce Nankervis	1976–1977
38	Ian Nankervis	1978–1981, 1983
39	Brian Peake	1982
40	Michael Turner	1984–1986
41	Damian Bourke	1987–1989
42	Andrew Bews	1990–1991
43	Mark Bairstow	1992–1994
44	Gary Ablett Sr.	1995–1996
45	Ken Hinkley	1995
46	Garry Hocking	1995, 1999
47	Barry Stoneham	1995–1998
48	Leigh Colbert	1999
49	Ben Graham	2000–2002
50	Steven King	2003–2006
51	Tom Harley	2007–2009
52	Cameron Ling	2010–2011
53	Joel Selwood	2012–2022
54	Patrick Dangerfield	2023–

== AFL Women's ==
Dates	Captain(s)	Notes
2019–2020	Melissa Hickey	
2021–2025	Meghan McDonald	
2026–	Nina Morrison/Rebecca Webster	
