= List of Geelong Football Club coaches =

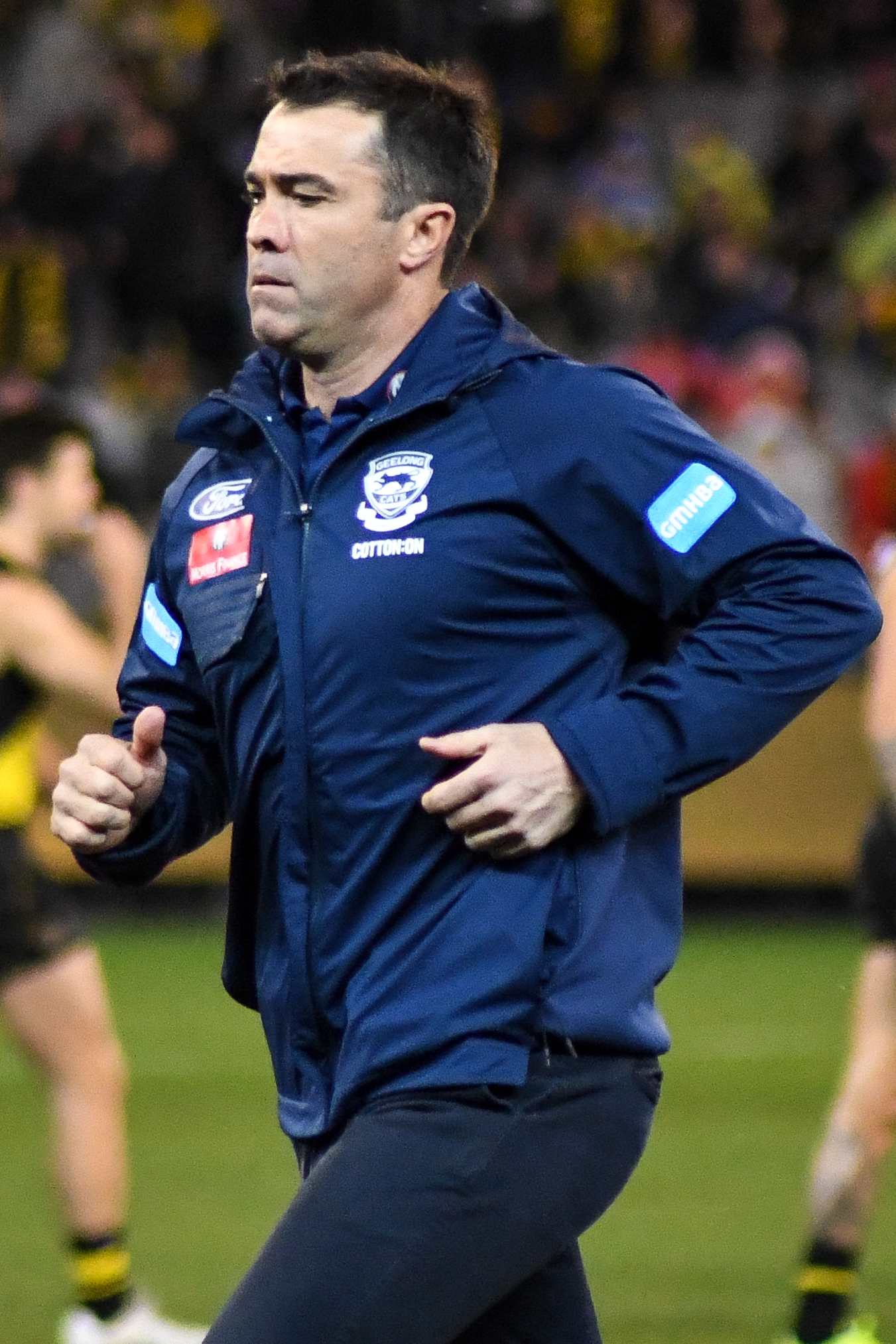
Current coach Chris Scott has held the senior coaching position since the 2011 AFL season.

Since becoming a foundation club of the Victorian Football League (VFL)—which is now known as the Australian Football League (AFL)—in 1897, there have been 31 senior coaches of the Geelong Football Club. To qualify, a coach must have coached the club in at least one senior VFL/AFL match, defined as an Australian rules football match between two clubs that are, or were at the time of the match, members of the VFL/AFL. A senior VFL/AFL match is played under the laws of Australian football, and includes regular season matches, as well as finals series matches. It does not include pre-season competition matches, Night Series matches, interstate matches or international rules football matches. The list is arranged in the order in which each coach first coached a game for Geelong in a senior VFL/AFL match.

== Key ==
#	Number of coaches
G	Games coached
W	Wins
L	Losses
D	Draws
Win%	Winning percentage
GF	Number of VFL/AFL Grand Final appearances
P	Number of VFL/AFL Premierships achieved by the coach
*	Player-coach
†	Caretaker coach
^	Premiership coach
*^	Player-coach and Premiership coach

== VFL/AFL ==
Figures correct as of end of 2025 season.

#	Name	Seasons	G	W	L	D	Win%	G	W	L	D	Win%	GF	P	Awards
#	Name	Seasons	All games					Finals					GF	P	Awards
1	David Hickinbotham	1910–1911	36	18	16	2	52.78	—	—	—	—	—	—	—	
2	Bill Eason*	1912–1913	37	21	16	0	56.76	1	0	1	0	0	—	—	
3	Billy Orchard	1914	19	11	7	1	60.53	1	0	1	0	0	—	—	
4	Bert Taylor	1923	17	9	8	0	52.94	1	0	1	0	0	—	—	
5	Lloyd Hagger	1924	16	8	8	0	50	—	—	—	—	—	—	—	
6	Cliff Rankin*^	1925–1927	57	45	12	0	78.95	1	3	0	4	25	1	1	VFL Premiership (1925)
7	Tom Fitzmaurice*	1928	26	6	20	0	23.08	—	—	—	—	—	—	—	
8	Arthur Coghlan	1929–1930, 1933–1934	80	49	30	1	61.88	7	3	4	0	42.86	1	0	VFL runners-up (1930)
9	Charlie Clymo^	1931	21	17	4	0	80.95	3	2	1	0	66.67	1	1	VFL Premiership (1931)
10	Reg Hickey^	1932, 1936–1940, 1949–1959	304	183	118	3	60.69	18	9	9	0	50	4	3	VFL Premiership (1937, 1951, 1952); VFL runners-up (1953); McClelland Trophy (1952, 1954)
11	Percy Parratt	1935	18	6	11	1	36.11	—	—	—	—	—	—	—	
12	Charlie Dibbs*	1936	7	3	4	0	42.82	—	—	—	—	—	—	—	
13	Allan Everett	1940	12	7	5	0	58.33	1	0	1	0	0	—	—	
14	Les Laver^{†}	1940	2	1	1	0	50	—	—	—	—	—	—	—	
15	Len Metherell	1941	18	3	15	0	16.67	—	—	—	—	—	—	—	
16	Tom Arklay	1944	18	1	17	0	5.56	—	—	—	—	—	—	—	
17	Jack Williams	1945	20	2	18	0	10	—	—	—	—	—	—	—	
18	Tommy Quinn	1946–1948	57	22	35	0	38.60	—	—	—	—	—	—	—	
19	Bob Davis^	1956–1965	116	72	39	5	64.22	8	3	4	1	43.75	1	1	VFL Premiership (1963); McClelland Trophy (1962, 1963); VFL Night Series Cup (1961)
20	Neil Trezise^{†}	1963	1	0	1	0	0	—	—	—	—	—	—	—	
21	Peter Pianto	1966–1970	105	70	34	1	67.14	7	3	4	0	42.86	1	0	VFL runners-up (1967)
22	Bill McMaster	1971–1972	44	12	32	0	27.27	—	—	—	—	—	—	—	
23	Graham Farmer	1973–1975	66	24	42	0	36.36	—	—	—	—	—	—	—	
24	Rodney Olsson	1976–1979	91	45	46	0	49.45	3	1	2	0	33.33	—	—	
25	Bill Goggin	1980–1982	71	41	30	0	57.75	5	1	4	0	20	—	—	McClelland Trophy (1980, 1981)
26	Tom Hafey	1983–1985	66	31	35	0	46.97	—	—	—	—	—	—	—	
27	John Devine	1986–1988	66	28	37	1	43.18	—	—	—	—	—	—	—	
28	Malcolm Blight	1989–1994	145	89	56	0	61.38	15	8	7	0	53.33	3	0	McClelland Trophy (1992); VFL/AFL runners-up (1989, 1992, 1994)
29	Gary Ayres	1995–1999	116	65	50	1	56.47	6	2	4	0	33.33	1	0	AFL runners-up (1995)
30	Mark Thompson^	2000–2010	260	161	96	3	62.50	18	11	7	0	61.11	3	2	AFL Premiership (2007, 2009); Jock McHale Medal (2007, 2009); AFL runners-up (2008); McClelland Trophy (2007, 2008); Pre-season Cup (2006, 2009)
31	Chris Scott^	2011–present	365	248	114	3	67.94	33	16	17	0	48.5	4	2	AFL Premiership (2011, 2022); Jock McHale Medal (2011, 2022); McClelland Trophy (2019, 2022); AFL runners-up (2020, 2025)

== AFL Women's ==
Figures correct as of end of the 2025 season.

#	Name	Seasons	G	W	L	D	Win%	G	W	L	D	Win%	GF	P	Awards
#	Name	Seasons	All games					Finals					GF	P	Awards
1	Paul Hood	2019–2021	23	6	17	0	26.09	1	0	1	0	0.00	—	—	
2	Daniel Lowther	2022 (S6)–2025	57	26	30	1	45.61	4	2	2	0	50.00	—	—	
3	Mick Stinear	2026–present	0	0	0	0	0.0	0	0	0	0	0.0	—	—	
