= Charlie Grummisch =

Australian rules footballer

Personal information
- Full name: Charlie Grummisch
- Born: 12 March 1952 (age 74)
- Original team: Kilcunda-Bass
- Height: 189 cm (6 ft 2 in)
- Weight: 81 kg (179 lb)
- Position: Forward

Playing career^{1}
Years	Club	Games (Goals)
1970–74	Hawthorn	50 (63)
- ^{1} Playing statistics correct to the end of 1974.

Charlie Grummisch (born 12 March 1952) is a former Australian rules footballer who played with Hawthorn in the Victorian Football League (VFL).

== VFL career ==
Recruited from Kilcunda-Bass in the Bass Valley Wonthaggi and District Football League Grummisch was a capable left foot kicker of the football. During his time at Glenferrie, Grummisch never established himself as a first choice senior player. Originally used in the backline, he was moved forward in 1972 after the injury to Peter Hudson. Hawthorn settled on Peter Knights at full forward. He was plagued with injuries for his final two seasons at the Hawks. His last season in 1975 at Hawthorn he spent the entire season in the reserves where he kicked 48 goals.

== Statistics ==
Updated to the end of 1974.

Legend
G	Goals	K	Kicks	D	Disposals	T	Tackles
B	Behinds	H	Handballs	M	Marks
#	Played in that season's premiership team

Season	Team	No.	Games	Totals							Averages (per game)							Votes
Season	Team	No.	Games	G	B	K	H	D	M	T	G	B	K	H	D	M	T	Votes
1970	Hawthorn	7	5	0	3	40	10	50	14		0.0	0.6	8.0	2.0	10.0	2.8		0
1971	Hawthorn	7	12	2	3	127	41	168	58		0.2	0.3	10.6	3.4	14.0	4.8		2
1972	Hawthorn	7	9	15	8	101	19	120	50		1.7	0.9	11.2	2.1	13.3	5.6		2
1973	Hawthorn	7	15	24	23	154	30	184	64		1.6	1.5	10.3	2.0	12.3	4.3		1
1974	Hawthorn	7	9	22	17	79	21	100	44		2.4	1.9	8.8	2.3	11.11	4.9		0
Career			50	63	54	501	121	622	230	0	1.26	1.08	10.02	2.42	12.44	4.60		5
