= Tom Brownlees =

Australian rules footballer

Personal information
- Full name: Thomas Ronald Brownlees
- Born: 20 October 1891; Naracoorte, South Australia
- Died: 15 November 1954 (aged 63); Healesville, Victoria
- Height: 180 cm (5 ft 11 in)
- Weight: 73 kg (161 lb)

Playing career^{1}
Years	Club	Games (Goals)
1913–1922	Geelong	116 (106)
- ^{1} Playing statistics correct to the end of 1922.

Thomas Ronald "Tobler" Brownlees (20 October 1891 - 15 November 1954) was an Australian rules footballer who played with Geelong in the Victorian Football League (VFL).

Brownlees kicked 42 goals in his debut season, finishing second in the Geelong goal-kicking to Percy Martini. Despite managing a more modest total of 25 goals in 1915, it was enough to finish as their leading goal-kicker. Also used as a fullback, Brownlees represented the VFL at the 1921 Perth Carnival.

An elder brother, Rupe, also played over 100 games for Geelong.
