= Larry Donohue =

Australian rules footballer, born 1955

Personal information
- Full name: Larry Donohue
- Nickname: Bear
- Born: 22 April 1955 (age 71)
- Original team: Thomson
- Height: 196 cm (6 ft 5 in)
- Weight: 97 kg (214 lb)
- Position: Full-forward

Playing career^{1}
Years	Club	Games (Goals)
1973–1980	Geelong	105 (339)

Representative team honours
Years	Team	Games (Goals)
	Victoria	? (?)
- ^{1} Playing statistics correct to the end of 1980.

Career highlights
- Coleman Medal, 1976; Geelong leading goalkicker, 1975–78

Larry Donohue (born 22 April 1955) is a former Australian rules footballer who played for the Geelong Football Club from 1973 to 1980, playing 105 games kicking 339 goals. He was recruited from the Thomson Football Club. He won the Coleman Medal in 1976 after kicking 99 goals. Donohue kicked 95 goals in 1978 and headed the Cats goalkicking from 1975 to 1978. Donohue moved to Fitzroy but never played senior football with the Lions retiring because of injuries. Donohue later coached locally in Geelong at Thomson and Newcomb guiding the Dinosaurs to the 1988 Bellarine Football League premiership. His son, Adam, was taken as a father–son selection in the 2007 AFL Draft. He did not play a senior game.

== VFL statistics ==
Legend
G	Goals	K	Kicks	D	Disposals	T	Tackles
B	Behinds	H	Handballs	M	Marks

Led the league for the season only
Led the league after finals only
Led the league after season and finals

Season	Team	No.	Games	Totals							Averages (per game)						
Season	Team	No.	Games	G	B	K	H	D	M	T	G	B	K	H	D	M	T
1973	Geelong	23	6	5	2	42	10	52	22	—N/a	0.8	0.3	7.0	1.7	8.7	3.7	—N/a
1974	Geelong	23	2	2	2	11	1	12	2	—N/a	1.0	1.0	5.5	0.5	6.0	1.0	—N/a
1975	Geelong	23	14	29	11	123	67	190	79	—N/a	2.1	0.8	8.8	4.8	13.6	5.6	—N/a
1976	Geelong	23	24	105	63	216	31	247	150	—N/a	4.4	2.6	9.0	1.3	10.3	6.3	—N/a
1977	Geelong	23	21	63	35	180	35	215	119	—N/a	3.0	1.8	8.6	1.7	10.2	5.7	—N/a
1978	Geelong	23	23	95	50	195	44	239	136	—N/a	4.1	2.3	8.5	1.9	10.4	5.9	—N/a
1979	Geelong	23	11	37	23	80	25	105	59	—N/a	3.4	2.1	7.3	2.3	9.5	5.4	—N/a
1980	Geelong	23	4	3	5	10	4	14	7	—N/a	0.8	1.3	2.5	1.0	3.5	1.8	—N/a
Career			105	339	191	857	217	1074	574	—N/a	3.2	1.9	8.2	2.1	10.2	5.5	—N/a
