= Peter Barry (footballer) =

Australian rules footballer

Personal information
- Full name: Peter John Barry
- Born: 19 October 1937
- Died: 7 June 2005 (aged 67)
- Original team: Bayswater
- Height: 189 cm (6 ft 2 in)
- Weight: 80 kg (176 lb)
- Position: Key position player

Playing career^{1}
Years	Club	Games (Goals)
1958–1963	Carlton	77 (24)
- ^{1} Playing statistics correct to the end of 1963.

Peter John Barry (19 October 1937 – 7 June 2005) was an Australian rules footballer who played with Carlton in the Victorian Football League (VFL).

Barry was a key position player, who joined Carlton from Bayswater. He broke into the seniors during the second half of the 1958 VFL season and the following year played 19 of a possible 20 games. After playing the opening two rounds in 1960, Barry struggled with illness and didn't made any more appearances that year.

He played mostly as a full-back and appeared in that position for Carlton in their 1962 finals campaign, for which he is most remembered. With just seconds remaining in the preliminary final replay against Geelong, Carlton were holding onto a five point lead as the ball was kicked in the direction of Barry and his opponent, full-forward Doug Wade. The mark was taken by Wade, just 30 metres out and directly in front of goals, but instead of taking what would have been a shot after the siren to win the game, umpire Jack Irving awarded Barry a free-kick. It was later explained that Irving had seen Wade holding Barry's shorts during the marking contest.

In 1964, having played only couple of reserves games, Barry was granted a clearance to Port Melbourne.
