= 1948 VFL season =

52nd season of the Victorian Football League (VFL)

1948 VFL premiership season
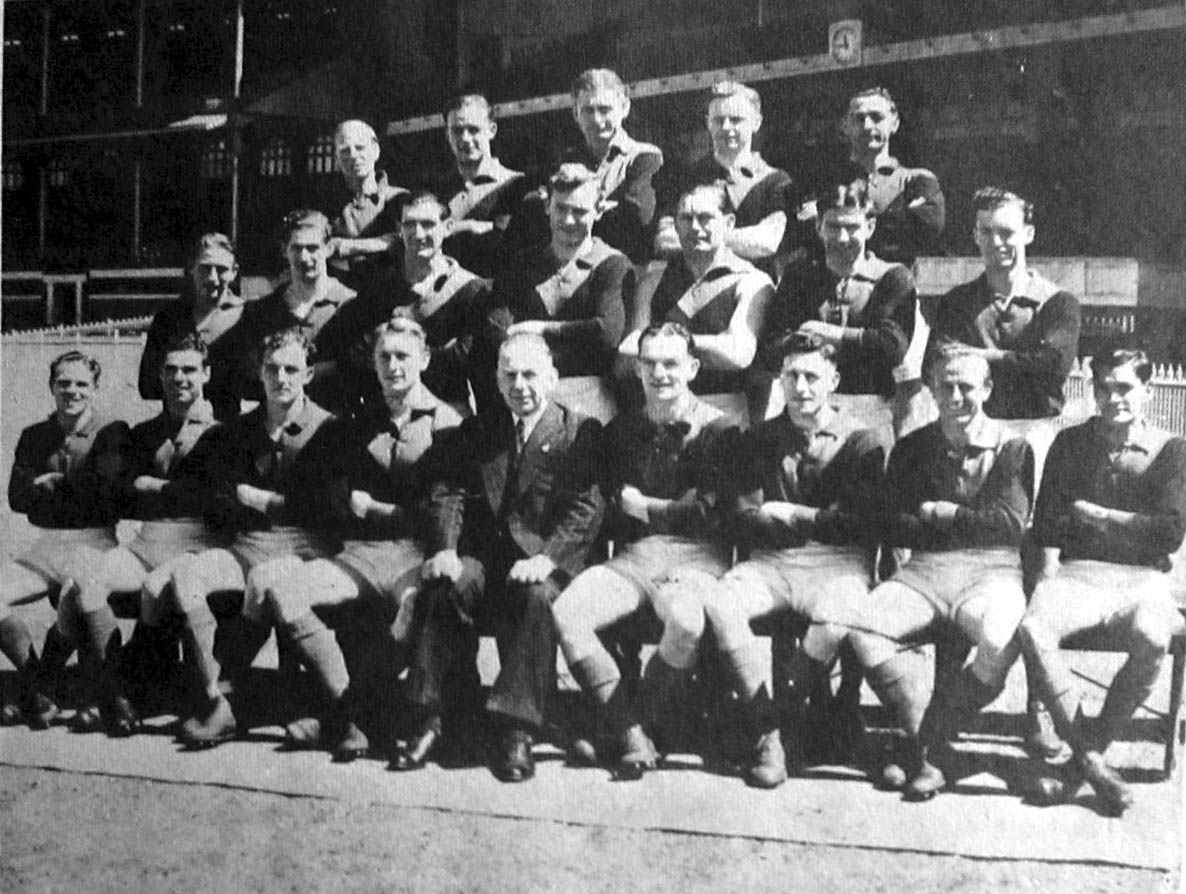
- Melbourne Football Club team, premiers
- Teams: 12
- Premiers: Melbourne; 6th premiership
- Minor premiers: Essendon; 9th minor premiership
- Brownlow Medallist: Bill Morris (Richmond)
- Leading goalkicker medallist: Lindsay White (Geelong)
- Matches played: 119
- Highest: 86,198

The 1948 VFL season was the 52nd season of the Victorian Football League (VFL), the highest level senior Australian rules football competition in Victoria. The season featured twelve clubs, ran from 17 April until 9 October, and comprised a 19-game home-and-away season followed by a finals series featuring the top four clubs.

The premiership was won by the Melbourne Football Club for the sixth time, after it defeated Essendon by 39 points in the 1948 VFL Grand Final Replay.

== Background ==
In 1948, the VFL competition consisted of twelve teams of 18 on-the-field players each, plus two substitute players, known as the 19th man and the 20th man. A player could be substituted for any reason; however, once substituted, a player could not return to the field of play under any circumstances.

Teams played each other in a home-and-away season of 19 rounds; matches 12 to 19 were the "home-and-way reverse" of matches 1 to 8.

Once the 19 round home-and-away season had finished, the 1948 VFL Premiers were determined by the specific format and conventions of the Page–McIntyre system.

== Home-and-away season ==
=== Round 1 ===
Home team	Home team score	Away team	Away team score	Venue	Crowd	Date
Footscray	21.19 (145)	St Kilda	9.11 (65)	Western Oval	14,000	17 April 1948
Fitzroy	13.14 (92)	Geelong	9.16 (70)	Brunswick Street Oval	17,000	17 April 1948
South Melbourne	18.15 (123)	Richmond	17.6 (108)	Lake Oval	28,000	17 April 1948
Melbourne	12.5 (77)	Essendon	13.18 (96)	MCG	29,000	17 April 1948
North Melbourne	9.12 (66)	Collingwood	11.20 (86)	Arden Street Oval	20,000	17 April 1948
Hawthorn	11.10 (76)	Carlton	17.15 (117)	Glenferrie Oval	16,000	17 April 1948

=== Round 2 ===
Home team	Home team score	Away team	Away team score	Venue	Crowd	Date
Geelong	15.17 (107)	North Melbourne	10.8 (68)	Kardinia Park	17,500	24 April 1948
Carlton	8.10 (58)	Fitzroy	10.18 (78)	Princes Park	32,000	24 April 1948
St Kilda	7.6 (48)	Melbourne	11.13 (79)	Junction Oval	9,000	24 April 1948
Richmond	20.12 (132)	Footscray	8.9 (57)	Punt Road Oval	29,000	24 April 1948
Essendon	11.16 (82)	Hawthorn	8.11 (59)	Windy Hill	16,000	26 April 1948
Collingwood	18.17 (125)	South Melbourne	10.12 (72)	Victoria Park	47,000	26 April 1948

=== Round 3 ===
Home team	Home team score	Away team	Away team score	Venue	Crowd	Date
North Melbourne	10.11 (71)	South Melbourne	13.16 (94)	Arden Street Oval	19,000	1 May 1948
Footscray	12.12 (84)	Hawthorn	6.9 (45)	Western Oval	13,000	1 May 1948
St Kilda	11.12 (78)	Richmond	15.16 (106)	Junction Oval	14,000	1 May 1948
Melbourne	6.12 (48)	Fitzroy	12.14 (86)	MCG	31,000	1 May 1948
Essendon	16.12 (108)	Collingwood	14.9 (93)	Windy Hill	30,000	1 May 1948
Geelong	12.15 (87)	Carlton	13.11 (89)	Kardinia Park	23,000	1 May 1948

=== Round 4 ===
Home team	Home team score	Away team	Away team score	Venue	Crowd	Date
Hawthorn	14.21 (105)	North Melbourne	11.15 (81)	Glenferrie Oval	9,000	8 May 1948
Fitzroy	19.14 (128)	St Kilda	6.8 (44)	Brunswick Street Oval	10,000	8 May 1948
Collingwood	18.13 (121)	Geelong	13.10 (88)	Victoria Park	18,000	8 May 1948
Carlton	12.24 (96)	Footscray	15.8 (98)	Princes Park	19,000	8 May 1948
Richmond	12.12 (84)	Melbourne	13.11 (89)	Punt Road Oval	19,000	8 May 1948
South Melbourne	11.12 (78)	Essendon	20.20 (140)	Lake Oval	20,000	8 May 1948

=== Round 5 ===
Home team	Home team score	Away team	Away team score	Venue	Crowd	Date
St Kilda	12.12 (84)	South Melbourne	14.23 (107)	Junction Oval	10,000	15 May 1948
Melbourne	14.11 (95)	North Melbourne	6.14 (50)	MCG	13,000	15 May 1948
Fitzroy	15.19 (109)	Hawthorn	6.11 (47)	Brunswick Street Oval	8,500	15 May 1948
Essendon	13.17 (95)	Richmond	14.11 (95)	Windy Hill	23,000	15 May 1948
Geelong	11.13 (79)	Footscray	8.10 (58)	Kardinia Park	17,500	15 May 1948
Collingwood	8.17 (65)	Carlton	9.9 (63)	Victoria Park	31,000	15 May 1948

=== Round 6 ===
Home team	Home team score	Away team	Away team score	Venue	Crowd	Date
North Melbourne	12.16 (88)	St Kilda	9.10 (64)	Arden Street Oval	7,000	22 May 1948
Carlton	14.9 (93)	Essendon	19.7 (121)	Princes Park	25,000	22 May 1948
South Melbourne	9.5 (59)	Melbourne	15.15 (105)	Lake Oval	17,500	22 May 1948
Hawthorn	17.10 (112)	Geelong	12.3 (75)	Glenferrie Oval	9,500	22 May 1948
Footscray	10.11 (71)	Fitzroy	9.10 (64)	Western Oval	18,000	22 May 1948
Richmond	21.14 (140)	Collingwood	9.21 (75)	Punt Road Oval	33,000	22 May 1948

=== Round 7 ===
Home team	Home team score	Away team	Away team score	Venue	Crowd	Date
Hawthorn	9.11 (65)	Richmond	12.14 (86)	Glenferrie Oval	17,000	29 May 1948
Footscray	8.12 (60)	South Melbourne	3.10 (28)	Western Oval	17,000	29 May 1948
Fitzroy	9.20 (74)	North Melbourne	7.8 (50)	Brunswick Street Oval	12,000	29 May 1948
Essendon	12.11 (83)	Geelong	14.15 (99)	Windy Hill	13,000	29 May 1948
St Kilda	4.12 (36)	Collingwood	10.18 (78)	Junction Oval	11,000	29 May 1948
Melbourne	15.12 (102)	Carlton	7.9 (51)	MCG	35,000	29 May 1948

=== Round 8 ===
Home team	Home team score	Away team	Away team score	Venue	Crowd	Date
Geelong	15.16 (106)	South Melbourne	19.12 (126)	Kardinia Park	19,500	5 June 1948
Collingwood	11.17 (83)	Melbourne	11.10 (76)	Victoria Park	20,000	5 June 1948
St Kilda	7.12 (54)	Hawthorn	10.12 (72)	Junction Oval	7,000	5 June 1948
North Melbourne	11.6 (72)	Footscray	8.9 (57)	Arden Street Oval	12,000	5 June 1948
Fitzroy	12.8 (80)	Essendon	9.10 (64)	Brunswick Street Oval	25,000	5 June 1948
Richmond	13.10 (88)	Carlton	9.21 (75)	Punt Road Oval	33,000	5 June 1948

=== Round 9 ===
Home team	Home team score	Away team	Away team score	Venue	Crowd	Date
Essendon	12.14 (86)	North Melbourne	4.8 (32)	Windy Hill	17,000	12 June 1948
South Melbourne	9.12 (66)	Fitzroy	15.11 (101)	Lake Oval	33,000	12 June 1948
Hawthorn	8.8 (56)	Collingwood	12.27 (99)	Glenferrie Oval	18,000	12 June 1948
Footscray	11.9 (75)	Melbourne	9.14 (68)	Western Oval	20,000	14 June 1948
Carlton	12.11 (83)	St Kilda	7.18 (60)	Princes Park	11,000	14 June 1948
Richmond	15.14 (104)	Geelong	14.19 (103)	Punt Road Oval	28,000	14 June 1948

=== Round 10 ===
Home team	Home team score	Away team	Away team score	Venue	Crowd	Date
North Melbourne	14.6 (90)	Richmond	9.16 (70)	Arden Street Oval	12,000	19 June 1948
Geelong	21.13 (139)	St Kilda	9.9 (63)	Kardinia Park	12,300	19 June 1948
Essendon	18.12 (120)	Footscray	4.14 (38)	Windy Hill	22,000	19 June 1948
Collingwood	15.12 (102)	Fitzroy	13.7 (85)	Victoria Park	38,000	19 June 1948
Melbourne	18.12 (120)	Hawthorn	11.13 (79)	MCG	12,200	19 June 1948
South Melbourne	13.9 (87)	Carlton	23.11 (149)	Lake Oval	24,000	19 June 1948

=== Round 11 ===
Home team	Home team score	Away team	Away team score	Venue	Crowd	Date
Hawthorn	9.7 (61)	South Melbourne	12.15 (87)	Glenferrie Oval	8,000	3 July 1948
Fitzroy	19.20 (134)	Richmond	14.11 (95)	Brunswick Street Oval	25,000	3 July 1948
Carlton	10.23 (83)	North Melbourne	14.10 (94)	Princes Park	13,500	3 July 1948
Melbourne	9.17 (71)	Geelong	8.9 (57)	MCG	16,000	3 July 1948
St Kilda	11.6 (72)	Essendon	17.22 (124)	Junction Oval	6,000	3 July 1948
Footscray	10.11 (71)	Collingwood	19.9 (123)	Western Oval	19,000	3 July 1948

=== Round 12 ===
Home team	Home team score	Away team	Away team score	Venue	Crowd	Date
Richmond	21.18 (144)	South Melbourne	9.13 (67)	Punt Road Oval	21,000	10 July 1948
Essendon	13.13 (91)	Melbourne	9.11 (65)	Windy Hill	17,000	10 July 1948
Collingwood	19.13 (127)	North Melbourne	10.11 (71)	Victoria Park	19,500	10 July 1948
Carlton	17.10 (112)	Hawthorn	10.9 (69)	Princes Park	9,000	10 July 1948
St Kilda	7.11 (53)	Footscray	13.13 (91)	Junction Oval	7,000	10 July 1948
Geelong	13.9 (87)	Fitzroy	9.17 (71)	Kardinia Park	18,500	10 July 1948

=== Round 13 ===
Home team	Home team score	Away team	Away team score	Venue	Crowd	Date
Melbourne	24.19 (163)	St Kilda	8.10 (58)	MCG	10,000	17 July 1948
Footscray	10.14 (74)	Richmond	12.9 (81)	Western Oval	20,000	17 July 1948
North Melbourne	10.8 (68)	Geelong	10.15 (75)	Arden Street Oval	12,000	17 July 1948
Hawthorn	9.12 (66)	Essendon	18.14 (122)	Glenferrie Oval	12,000	17 July 1948
South Melbourne	10.12 (72)	Collingwood	13.16 (94)	Lake Oval	22,000	17 July 1948
Fitzroy	12.12 (84)	Carlton	16.17 (113)	Brunswick Street Oval	27,000	17 July 1948

=== Round 14 ===
Home team	Home team score	Away team	Away team score	Venue	Crowd	Date
Richmond	21.20 (146)	St Kilda	5.9 (39)	Punt Road Oval	11,000	24 July 1948
Fitzroy	11.11 (77)	Melbourne	17.11 (113)	Brunswick Street Oval	17,500	24 July 1948
Collingwood	12.13 (85)	Essendon	16.11 (107)	Victoria Park	35,000	24 July 1948
Carlton	24.9 (153)	Geelong	9.8 (62)	Princes Park	17,500	24 July 1948
South Melbourne	14.18 (102)	North Melbourne	15.14 (104)	Lake Oval	12,000	24 July 1948
Hawthorn	11.7 (73)	Footscray	11.12 (78)	Glenferrie Oval	8,000	24 July 1948

=== Round 15 ===
Home team	Home team score	Away team	Away team score	Venue	Crowd	Date
North Melbourne	11.18 (84)	Hawthorn	8.9 (57)	Arden Street Oval	9,000	31 July 1948
St Kilda	11.6 (72)	Fitzroy	9.10 (64)	Junction Oval	12,000	31 July 1948
Geelong	10.18 (78)	Collingwood	10.13 (73)	Kardinia Park	19,000	31 July 1948
Melbourne	6.8 (44)	Richmond	15.16 (106)	MCG	41,000	7 August 1948
Essendon	11.21 (87)	South Melbourne	8.11 (59)	Windy Hill	14,000	7 August 1948
Footscray	4.17 (41)	Carlton	15.19 (109)	Western Oval	17,500	7 August 1948

=== Round 16 ===
Home team	Home team score	Away team	Away team score	Venue	Crowd	Date
Footscray	11.25 (91)	Geelong	7.15 (57)	Western Oval	8,000	14 August 1948
Carlton	10.20 (80)	Collingwood	10.10 (70)	Princes Park	31,000	14 August 1948
South Melbourne	5.11 (41)	St Kilda	5.9 (39)	Lake Oval	5,500	14 August 1948
North Melbourne	5.12 (42)	Melbourne	10.14 (74)	Arden Street Oval	6,000	14 August 1948
Hawthorn	6.7 (43)	Fitzroy	4.16 (40)	Glenferrie Oval	8,500	14 August 1948
Richmond	8.7 (55)	Essendon	8.10 (58)	Punt Road Oval	29,000	14 August 1948

=== Round 17 ===
Home team	Home team score	Away team	Away team score	Venue	Crowd	Date
Melbourne	15.13 (103)	South Melbourne	7.12 (54)	MCG	13,500	21 August 1948
Geelong	11.14 (80)	Hawthorn	11.15 (81)	Kardinia Park	10,000	21 August 1948
Fitzroy	9.9 (63)	Footscray	11.15 (81)	Brunswick Street Oval	12,000	21 August 1948
Collingwood	15.18 (108)	Richmond	10.12 (72)	Victoria Park	28,000	21 August 1948
St Kilda	8.10 (58)	North Melbourne	7.19 (61)	Junction Oval	5,000	21 August 1948
Essendon	16.15 (111)	Carlton	11.11 (77)	Windy Hill	28,000	21 August 1948

=== Round 18 ===
Home team	Home team score	Away team	Away team score	Venue	Crowd	Date
Collingwood	15.19 (109)	St Kilda	11.4 (70)	Victoria Park	11,000	28 August 1948
Carlton	13.14 (92)	Melbourne	15.11 (101)	Princes Park	27,000	28 August 1948
Richmond	17.11 (113)	Hawthorn	9.6 (60)	Punt Road Oval	16,000	28 August 1948
South Melbourne	7.7 (49)	Footscray	14.16 (100)	Lake Oval	10,500	28 August 1948
North Melbourne	8.12 (60)	Fitzroy	6.10 (46)	Arden Street Oval	8,000	28 August 1948
Geelong	9.10 (64)	Essendon	10.12 (72)	Kardinia Park	18,500	28 August 1948

=== Round 19 ===
Home team	Home team score	Away team	Away team score	Venue	Crowd	Date
Hawthorn	7.12 (54)	St Kilda	9.13 (67)	Glenferrie Oval	5,000	4 September 1948
Footscray	18.21 (129)	North Melbourne	11.10 (76)	Western Oval	12,000	4 September 1948
Essendon	10.11 (71)	Fitzroy	7.11 (53)	Windy Hill	14,000	4 September 1948
Carlton	9.21 (75)	Richmond	9.16 (70)	Princes Park	24,000	4 September 1948
South Melbourne	21.15 (141)	Geelong	6.9 (45)	Lake Oval	8,000	4 September 1948
Melbourne	13.11 (89)	Collingwood	8.11 (59)	MCG	42,500	4 September 1948

== Ladder ==
(P)	Premiers
	Qualified for finals

#	Team	P	W	L	D	PF	PA	%	Pts
1	Essendon	19	16	2	1	1838	1340	137.2	66
2	Melbourne (P)	19	13	6	0	1682	1347	124.9	52
3	Collingwood	19	13	6	0	1775	1500	118.3	52
4	Footscray	19	12	7	0	1499	1453	103.2	48
5	Richmond	19	11	7	1	1895	1509	125.6	46
6	Carlton	19	10	9	0	1768	1564	113.0	40
7	Fitzroy	19	9	10	0	1529	1355	112.8	36
8	North Melbourne	19	8	11	0	1328	1589	83.6	32
9	Geelong	19	7	12	0	1558	1737	89.7	28
10	South Melbourne	19	7	12	0	1512	1826	82.8	28
11	Hawthorn	19	5	14	0	1280	1690	75.7	20
12	St Kilda	19	2	17	0	1124	1878	59.9	8

Rules for classification: 1. premiership points; 2. percentage; 3. points for
Average score: 82.4
Source: AFL Tables

== Finals series ==
=== Semi-finals ===
Team	1 Qtr	2 Qtr	3 Qtr	Final
Collingwood	3.8	6.11	12.14	17.17 (119)
Footscray	4.3	8.9	9.9	12.12 (84)
Attendance: 71,514

Team	1 Qtr	2 Qtr	3 Qtr	Final
Essendon	3.2	8.9	12.12	13.16 (94)
Melbourne	3.2	4.3	8.8	8.10 (58)
Attendance: 72,394

=== Preliminary final ===
Team	1 Qtr	2 Qtr	3 Qtr	Final
Melbourne	4.6	11.13	19.15	25.16 (166)
Collingwood	6.2	8.5	11.8	15.11 (101)
Attendance: 63,500

=== Grand final ===
Team	1 Qtr	2 Qtr	3 Qtr	Final
Essendon	0.6	2.15	6.21	7.27 (69)
Melbourne	3.0	4.5	6.8	10.9 (69)
Attendance: 86,198

=== Grand final replay ===
Team	1 Qtr	2 Qtr	3 Qtr	Final
Essendon	0.3	5.5	6.6	7.8 (50)
Melbourne	6.2	9.3	11.6	13.11 (89)
Attendance:52,226

== Season notes ==
- All VFL matches were now scheduled to start at 2:15pm; previously it had been 2:30pm.
- In round 7, Melbourne champion Norm Smith played his two hundredth game. He was reported for abusing the umpire; despite his claim that he had only said "don't be silly", he was suspended for four weeks.
- After Carlton's round 11 loss at home to North Melbourne, police drew their batons to protect the umpires from Carlton fans.
- In the round 16 match between Footscray and Geelong at the Western Oval the north wind was so fierce that when the Geelong full-back Bruce Morrison kicked the ball off after Footscray had scored a behind, the ball floated back over his head and went through the goal; the Goal umpire signalled a "forced behind". Only 1.1 (7) of the game's combined score of 18.40 (148) was scored against the wind. Time on for the whole match was 45 minutes and 39 seconds, while three footballs were lost.
- The 1948 Grand Final was the first drawn Grand Final in VFL history. The second was the 1977 VFL Grand Final, and the third was the 2010 AFL Grand Final.

== Awards ==
- The 1948 VFL Premiership team was Melbourne.
- The VFL's leading goalkicker was Lindsay White of Geelong 86 goals.
- The winner of the 1948 Brownlow Medal was Bill Morris of Richmond with 24 votes.
- St Kilda took the "wooden spoon" in 1948.
- The seconds premiership was won by Geelong. Geelong 17.12 (114) defeated Richmond 12.9 (81) in the Grand Final, played as a curtain-raiser to the drawn senior Grand Final on Saturday 2 October at the Melbourne Cricket Ground.

== Sources ==
- 1948 VFL season at AFL Tables
- 1948 VFL season at Australian Football
