= 1962 VFL season =

66th season of the Victorian Football League (VFL)

1962 VFL premiership season
- Teams: 12
- Premiers: Essendon; 11th premiership
- Minor premiers: Essendon; 11th minor premiership
- Consolation series: Richmond; 1st Consolation series win
- Brownlow Medallist: Alistair Lord (Geelong)
- Coleman Medallist: Doug Wade (Geelong)
- Matches played: 113
- Highest: 99,203

The 1962 VFL season was the 66th season of the Victorian Football League (VFL), the highest level senior Australian rules football competition in Victoria. The season featured twelve clubs, ran from 21 April until 29 September, and comprised an 18-game home-and-away season followed by a finals series featuring the top four clubs.

The premiership was won by the Essendon Football Club for the eleventh time, after it defeated Carlton by 32 points in the 1962 VFL Grand Final.

== Background ==
In 1962, the VFL competition consisted of twelve teams of 18 on-the-field players each, plus two substitute players, known as the 19th man and the 20th man. A player could be substituted for any reason; however, once substituted, a player could not return to the field of play under any circumstances.

Teams played each other in a home-and-away season of 18 rounds; matches 12 to 18 were the "home-and-way reverse" of matches 1 to 7.

Once the 18 round home-and-away season had finished, the 1962 VFL Premiers were determined by the specific format and conventions of the Page–McIntyre system.

== Home-and-away season ==
=== Round 1 ===
Home team	Home team score	Away team	Away team score	Venue	Crowd	Date
Melbourne	11.13 (79)	Richmond	6.15 (51)	MCG	41,634	21 April 1962
Footscray	12.8 (80)	Hawthorn	6.11 (47)	Western Oval	30,752	21 April 1962
Carlton	13.10 (88)	Geelong	19.13 (127)	Princes Park	41,846	21 April 1962
Essendon	12.13 (85)	Fitzroy	7.6 (48)	Windy Hill	29,200	23 April 1962
Collingwood	5.8 (38)	St Kilda	9.9 (63)	Victoria Park	42,170	23 April 1962
South Melbourne	14.13 (97)	North Melbourne	13.13 (91)	Lake Oval	22,340	23 April 1962

=== Round 2 ===
Home team	Home team score	Away team	Away team score	Venue	Crowd	Date
St Kilda	10.13 (73)	South Melbourne	13.7 (85)	Junction Oval	23,200	28 April 1962
Geelong	7.7 (49)	Melbourne	8.8 (56)	Kardinia Park	20,344	28 April 1962
Fitzroy	6.7 (43)	Footscray	16.15 (111)	Brunswick Street Oval	18,754	28 April 1962
North Melbourne	7.9 (51)	Essendon	10.8 (68)	Arden Street Oval	15,496	28 April 1962
Hawthorn	13.9 (87)	Collingwood	10.15 (75)	Glenferrie Oval	23,500	28 April 1962
Richmond	9.11 (65)	Carlton	11.9 (75)	Punt Road Oval	17,784	28 April 1962

=== Round 3 ===
Home team	Home team score	Away team	Away team score	Venue	Crowd	Date
Geelong	18.10 (118)	Hawthorn	12.7 (79)	Kardinia Park	25,819	5 May 1962
Fitzroy	9.11 (65)	St Kilda	16.7 (103)	Brunswick Street Oval	16,981	5 May 1962
Essendon	12.22 (94)	Richmond	9.13 (67)	Windy Hill	22,500	5 May 1962
Carlton	16.14 (110)	North Melbourne	7.6 (48)	Princes Park	19,933	5 May 1962
Melbourne	14.10 (94)	Footscray	4.11 (35)	MCG	55,012	5 May 1962
South Melbourne	7.14 (56)	Collingwood	15.10 (100)	Lake Oval	29,840	5 May 1962

=== Round 4 ===
Home team	Home team score	Away team	Away team score	Venue	Crowd	Date
Footscray	17.17 (119)	South Melbourne	10.11 (71)	Western Oval	24,168	12 May 1962
Collingwood	6.15 (51)	Melbourne	12.11 (83)	Victoria Park	31,315	12 May 1962
Richmond	13.15 (93)	Geelong	18.10 (118)	Punt Road Oval	24,336	12 May 1962
North Melbourne	7.14 (56)	Fitzroy	18.13 (121)	Arden Street Oval	13,100	12 May 1962
St Kilda	10.15 (75)	Essendon	11.13 (79)	Junction Oval	37,300	12 May 1962
Hawthorn	12.6 (78)	Carlton	12.19 (91)	Glenferrie Oval	22,300	12 May 1962

=== Round 5 ===
Home team	Home team score	Away team	Away team score	Venue	Crowd	Date
Melbourne	16.8 (104)	North Melbourne	13.5 (83)	MCG	20,748	19 May 1962
Hawthorn	11.8 (74)	Richmond	9.16 (70)	Glenferrie Oval	18,000	19 May 1962
Footscray	13.12 (90)	St Kilda	9.19 (73)	Western Oval	30,661	19 May 1962
Carlton	11.7 (73)	Essendon	17.16 (118)	Princes Park	36,457	19 May 1962
South Melbourne	10.13 (73)	Fitzroy	13.16 (94)	Lake Oval	17,760	19 May 1962
Geelong	11.9 (75)	Collingwood	13.9 (87)	Kardinia Park	27,788	19 May 1962

=== Round 6 ===
Home team	Home team score	Away team	Away team score	Venue	Crowd	Date
Melbourne	8.15 (63)	South Melbourne	1.11 (17)	MCG	25,737	26 May 1962
Fitzroy	11.13 (79)	Hawthorn	8.8 (56)	Brunswick Street Oval	14,781	26 May 1962
Essendon	14.9 (93)	Footscray	13.9 (87)	Windy Hill	37,000	26 May 1962
St Kilda	13.10 (88)	Richmond	12.8 (80)	Junction Oval	33,600	26 May 1962
North Melbourne	6.14 (50)	Geelong	19.15 (129)	Arden Street Oval	14,140	26 May 1962
Collingwood	12.8 (80)	Carlton	10.4 (64)	Victoria Park	34,528	26 May 1962

=== Round 7 ===
Home team	Home team score	Away team	Away team score	Venue	Crowd	Date
Richmond	14.7 (91)	North Melbourne	6.12 (48)	Punt Road Oval	16,943	2 June 1962
South Melbourne	7.11 (53)	Essendon	16.15 (111)	Lake Oval	25,640	2 June 1962
Footscray	9.9 (63)	Collingwood	4.4 (28)	Western Oval	40,224	2 June 1962
Hawthorn	9.8 (62)	St Kilda	12.22 (94)	Glenferrie Oval	28,000	4 June 1962
Carlton	10.10 (70)	Melbourne	7.12 (54)	Princes Park	32,000	4 June 1962
Geelong	13.22 (100)	Fitzroy	9.8 (62)	Kardinia Park	29,230	4 June 1962

=== Round 8 ===
Home team	Home team score	Away team	Away team score	Venue	Crowd	Date
Geelong	9.10 (64)	South Melbourne	6.8 (44)	Kardinia Park	17,873	9 June 1962
Fitzroy	12.4 (76)	Melbourne	9.20 (74)	Brunswick Street Oval	15,499	9 June 1962
Richmond	9.10 (64)	Footscray	11.11 (77)	Punt Road Oval	26,656	9 June 1962
Hawthorn	9.15 (69)	Essendon	7.10 (52)	Glenferrie Oval	21,000	9 June 1962
North Melbourne	7.10 (52)	Collingwood	15.19 (109)	Arden Street Oval	18,503	9 June 1962
St Kilda	5.13 (43)	Carlton	6.10 (46)	Junction Oval	38,300	9 June 1962

=== Round 9 ===
Home team	Home team score	Away team	Away team score	Venue	Crowd	Date
Melbourne	11.18 (84)	St Kilda	11.6 (72)	MCG	48,952	23 June 1962
Essendon	15.17 (107)	Geelong	10.7 (67)	Windy Hill	35,000	23 June 1962
Collingwood	10.14 (74)	Fitzroy	9.11 (65)	Victoria Park	26,488	23 June 1962
Carlton	12.9 (81)	Footscray	9.10 (64)	Princes Park	32,400	23 June 1962
South Melbourne	10.13 (73)	Richmond	11.13 (79)	Lake Oval	17,000	23 June 1962
North Melbourne	10.8 (68)	Hawthorn	10.7 (67)	Arden Street Oval	8,470	23 June 1962

=== Round 10 ===
Home team	Home team score	Away team	Away team score	Venue	Crowd	Date
Geelong	7.10 (52)	St Kilda	6.12 (48)	Kardinia Park	23,295	30 June 1962
Footscray	12.10 (82)	North Melbourne	8.17 (65)	Western Oval	20,579	30 June 1962
Collingwood	14.16 (100)	Richmond	13.10 (88)	Victoria Park	25,479	30 June 1962
South Melbourne	7.8 (50)	Hawthorn	12.14 (86)	Lake Oval	10,150	30 June 1962
Melbourne	7.13 (55)	Essendon	10.13 (73)	MCG	86,275	30 June 1962
Fitzroy	6.15 (51)	Carlton	7.10 (52)	Brunswick Street Oval	20,340	30 June 1962

=== Round 11 ===
Home team	Home team score	Away team	Away team score	Venue	Crowd	Date
Hawthorn	11.14 (80)	Melbourne	14.12 (96)	Glenferrie Oval	18,000	7 July 1962
Footscray	8.10 (58)	Geelong	20.9 (129)	Western Oval	34,032	7 July 1962
Carlton	17.14 (116)	South Melbourne	6.12 (48)	Princes Park	20,200	7 July 1962
St Kilda	10.8 (68)	North Melbourne	12.6 (78)	Junction Oval	17,750	7 July 1962
Richmond	10.16 (76)	Fitzroy	9.12 (66)	Punt Road Oval	18,470	7 July 1962
Essendon	13.16 (94)	Collingwood	11.11 (77)	Windy Hill	37,000	7 July 1962

=== Round 12 ===
Home team	Home team score	Away team	Away team score	Venue	Crowd	Date
North Melbourne	12.22 (94)	South Melbourne	5.15 (45)	Arden Street Oval	9,543	14 July 1962
Richmond	10.9 (69)	Melbourne	12.12 (84)	Punt Road Oval	21,174	14 July 1962
Hawthorn	13.6 (84)	Footscray	16.6 (102)	Glenferrie Oval	16,000	14 July 1962
Fitzroy	5.19 (49)	Essendon	14.18 (102)	Brunswick Street Oval	21,236	14 July 1962
St Kilda	16.12 (108)	Collingwood	12.13 (85)	Junction Oval	29,500	14 July 1962
Geelong	8.9 (57)	Carlton	11.7 (73)	Kardinia Park	30,591	14 July 1962

=== Round 13 ===
Home team	Home team score	Away team	Away team score	Venue	Crowd	Date
Essendon	13.11 (89)	North Melbourne	8.7 (55)	Windy Hill	20,500	21 July 1962
Collingwood	15.9 (99)	Hawthorn	9.6 (60)	Victoria Park	16,848	21 July 1962
Carlton	9.13 (67)	Richmond	6.15 (51)	Princes Park	19,029	21 July 1962
South Melbourne	9.9 (63)	St Kilda	11.14 (80)	Lake Oval	14,380	21 July 1962
Melbourne	9.9 (63)	Geelong	10.19 (79)	MCG	51,470	21 July 1962
Footscray	10.5 (65)	Fitzroy	5.16 (46)	Western Oval	17,721	21 July 1962

=== Round 14 ===
Home team	Home team score	Away team	Away team score	Venue	Crowd	Date
Footscray	6.11 (47)	Melbourne	9.14 (68)	Western Oval	28,801	28 July 1962
Collingwood	11.10 (76)	South Melbourne	10.12 (72)	Victoria Park	19,115	28 July 1962
Hawthorn	11.17 (83)	Geelong	16.13 (109)	Glenferrie Oval	18,000	28 July 1962
St Kilda	13.16 (94)	Fitzroy	8.6 (54)	Junction Oval	18,450	28 July 1962
Richmond	11.17 (83)	Essendon	12.12 (84)	Punt Road Oval	24,043	28 July 1962
North Melbourne	7.6 (48)	Carlton	11.12 (78)	Arden Street Oval	16,436	28 July 1962

=== Round 15 ===
Home team	Home team score	Away team	Away team score	Venue	Crowd	Date
Geelong	15.8 (98)	Richmond	7.12 (54)	Kardinia Park	23,555	4 August 1962
Fitzroy	7.8 (50)	North Melbourne	8.12 (60)	Brunswick Street Oval	9,399	4 August 1962
Essendon	15.7 (97)	St Kilda	5.17 (47)	Windy Hill	26,000	4 August 1962
Carlton	8.11 (59)	Hawthorn	7.11 (53)	Princes Park	18,250	4 August 1962
South Melbourne	9.9 (63)	Footscray	10.20 (80)	Lake Oval	17,200	4 August 1962
Melbourne	14.8 (92)	Collingwood	11.11 (77)	MCG	54,312	4 August 1962

=== Round 16 ===
Home team	Home team score	Away team	Away team score	Venue	Crowd	Date
Fitzroy	17.16 (118)	South Melbourne	22.11 (143)	Brunswick Street Oval	10,169	11 August 1962
Collingwood	7.11 (53)	Geelong	12.23 (95)	Victoria Park	30,000	11 August 1962
North Melbourne	10.11 (71)	Melbourne	11.17 (83)	Arden Street Oval	10,339	11 August 1962
Richmond	11.11 (77)	Hawthorn	15.4 (94)	Punt Road Oval	15,992	11 August 1962
St Kilda	12.14 (86)	Footscray	11.10 (76)	Junction Oval	36,300	11 August 1962
Essendon	10.11 (71)	Carlton	9.8 (62)	Windy Hill	39,000	11 August 1962

=== Round 17 ===
Home team	Home team score	Away team	Away team score	Venue	Crowd	Date
Richmond	10.8 (68)	St Kilda	8.16 (64)	Punt Road Oval	20,752	18 August 1962
Geelong	14.18 (102)	North Melbourne	10.11 (71)	Kardinia Park	26,707	18 August 1962
Carlton	17.14 (116)	Collingwood	11.8 (74)	Princes Park	32,550	18 August 1962
South Melbourne	7.10 (52)	Melbourne	9.13 (67)	Lake Oval	18,300	18 August 1962
Hawthorn	12.11 (83)	Fitzroy	13.13 (91)	Glenferrie Oval	9,600	18 August 1962
Footscray	15.11 (101)	Essendon	9.10 (64)	Western Oval	31,185	18 August 1962

=== Round 18 ===
Home team	Home team score	Away team	Away team score	Venue	Crowd	Date
North Melbourne	9.9 (63)	Richmond	12.10 (82)	Arden Street Oval	10,602	25 August 1962
Fitzroy	5.14 (44)	Geelong	18.14 (122)	Brunswick Street Oval	18,447	25 August 1962
Essendon	13.15 (93)	South Melbourne	13.10 (88)	Windy Hill	20,900	25 August 1962
Collingwood	12.10 (82)	Footscray	7.11 (53)	Victoria Park	23,936	25 August 1962
St Kilda	14.16 (100)	Hawthorn	9.11 (65)	Junction Oval	17,450	25 August 1962
Melbourne	11.9 (75)	Carlton	5.10 (40)	MCG	54,264	25 August 1962

== Ladder ==
(P)	Premiers
	Qualified for finals

#	Team	P	W	L	D	PF	PA	%	Pts
1	Essendon (P)	18	16	2	0	1574	1207	130.4	64
2	Geelong	18	14	4	0	1690	1213	139.3	56
3	Melbourne	18	14	4	0	1374	1092	125.8	56
4	Carlton	18	13	5	0	1361	1205	112.9	52
5	Footscray	18	11	7	0	1390	1281	108.5	44
6	St Kilda	18	9	9	0	1379	1267	108.8	36
7	Collingwood	18	9	9	0	1365	1386	98.5	36
8	Richmond	18	5	13	0	1308	1446	90.5	20
9	Hawthorn	18	5	13	0	1307	1510	86.6	20
10	Fitzroy	18	5	13	0	1222	1529	79.9	20
11	North Melbourne	18	4	14	0	1152	1575	73.1	16
12	South Melbourne	18	3	15	0	1193	1604	74.4	12

Rules for classification: 1. premiership points; 2. percentage; 3. points for
Average score: 75.5
Source: AFL Tables

== Finals series ==
=== Semi-finals ===
Team	1 Qtr	2 Qtr	3 Qtr	Final
Melbourne	2.4	6.4	11.9	11.10 (76)
Carlton	2.3	6.5	9.7	11.12 (78)
Attendance: 82,773

Team	1 Qtr	2 Qtr	3 Qtr	Final
Essendon	3.3	7.6	10.13	14.21 (105)
Geelong	2.8	6.13	7.15	7.17 (59)
Attendance: 95,393

=== Preliminary final ===
Team	1 Qtr	2 Qtr	3 Qtr	Final
Geelong	4.2	7.4	9.5	13.7 (85)
Carlton	3.3	4.4	8.9	12.13 (85)
Attendance: 87,824

=== Preliminary final replay ===
Team	1 Qtr	2 Qtr	3 Qtr	Final
Geelong	3.2	5.9	7.12	10.13 (73)
Carlton	1.4	5.8	9.9	10.18 (78)
Attendance: 99,203

=== Grand final ===
Team	1 Qtr	2 Qtr	3 Qtr	Final
Essendon	6.5	7.7	10.10	13.12 (90)
Carlton	1.1	5.6	7.8	8.10 (58)
Attendance: 98,385

== Consolation Night Series ==
The night series was held under the floodlights at Lake Oval, South Melbourne, for the teams (5th to 12th on ladder) out of the finals at the end of the season.

Final: Richmond 8.16 (64) defeated Hawthorn 9.6 (60)

== Season notes ==
- Having abandoned live telecasts of the last quarters of VFL matches at the end of 1960, and having forbidden Saturday evening replays during the 1961 season, the VFL agreed to allow television stations to broadcast one hour of replays each Saturday evening, provided no more than 30 minutes of any one match was broadcast. A separate arrangement was made to allow a replay of the entire Grand Final match.
- St Kilda won its first match against Collingwood at Victoria Park since round 2, 1919.
- On Anzac Day, a representative match was played at the Melbourne Cricket Ground between the Victorian team from the 1961 Brisbane Carnival, and a team representing the rest of the league. The Rest 13.7 (85) defeated the Carnival team 10.17 (77) in front of a crowd of 17,068.
- In the Round 10 match between Carlton and Fitzroy at the Brunswick Street Oval, scores were level at 51 apiece when the final siren sounded; but, play was at the opposite end of the venue to the grandstand where the siren was located, and the umpire did not hear it. From the ensuing ball-up, Carlton's Martin Cross punched the ball through for a rushed behind, and Carlton won by that point. Fitzroy did not protest the result; it did request that the Fitzroy Cricket Club install new sirens at the other end of the field, but the request was rejected.
- In September, the VFL purchased land to the east of Melbourne, at Mulgrave, upon which later built VFL Park.
- The preliminary final replay between Carlton and Geelong was by Carlton won by five points. In the final moments of the match, Geelong full forward Doug Wade took a strong mark directly in front of the Geelong goals, but he was penalised for interfering with Carlton full-back Peter Barry.
- In the grand final, a badly injured Geoff Leek played one of the best matches in his career to nullify Carlton's John Nicholls and pave the way for a sound 32 point win by Essendon.

== Awards ==
- The 1962 VFL Premiership team was Essendon.
- The VFL's leading goalkicker was Doug Wade of Geelong who kicked 68 goals (including 6 goals in the final series).
- The winner of the 1962 Brownlow Medal was Alistair Lord of Geelong with 28 votes.
- South Melbourne took the "wooden spoon" in 1962.
- The reserves premiership was won by Footscray. Footscray 13.13 (91) defeated St Kilda 10.8 (68) in the Grand Final, held as a curtain-raiser to the Preliminary Final Replay at the Melbourne Cricket Ground on 22 September.

== Sources ==
- 1962 VFL season at AFL Tables
- 1962 VFL season at Australian Football
