= Jim Kearney (Australian footballer) =

Australian rules footballer

Personal information
- Full name: James Patrick Kearney
- Born: 4 July 1893; Geelong, Victoria
- Died: 29 February 1944 (aged 50); Geelong, Victoria
- Original team: Geelong West / St Mary's
- Height: 183 cm (6 ft 0 in)
- Weight: 79 kg (174 lb)

Playing career^{1}
Years	Club	Games (Goals)
1915	Geelong	16 (4)
1916	Richmond	7 (0)
1917–1921	Geelong	56 (13)
Total		79 (17)
- ^{1} Playing statistics correct to the end of 1921.

Career highlights
- Geelong captain 1918–1919

James Patrick Kearney (4 July 1893 – 29 February 1944) was an Australian rules football player for Geelong and Richmond in the Victorian Football League (VFL) between 1915 and 1921.

== Family ==
One of the five children of the former Geelong (VFA) footballer, Daniel Michael Kearney (1865–1925), and Mary Ellen "Pollie" Kearney (1861–1935), née McCoy, James Patrick Kearney was born at Geelong, Victoria on 4 July 1893. His brother, Daniel Timothy Joseph Kearney (1895–1917), was killed in action, in Belgium, while serving with the First AIF.

He married Elizabeth Mary Lang (1891–1982) in 1918. They had three children; one of whom, Daniel Martin Kearney (1921–1984), played VFL football with both Geelong and North Melbourne.

== Football ==
=== Geelong (VFL) ===
Recruited from Geelong West, he played in 16 matches in 1916.

=== Richmond (VFL) ===
In 1916 he played in 7 matches for Richmond, including Richmond's Semi-Final loss to Carlton, at the MCG, on 19 August 1916.

=== Geelong (VFL) ===
He returned to Geelong in 1917, and went on to play another 79 games. He served as Geelong's captain in 1918 and 1919.

== Death ==
He died at Geelong on 29 February 1944.
