= Percy Martini =

Australian rules footballer

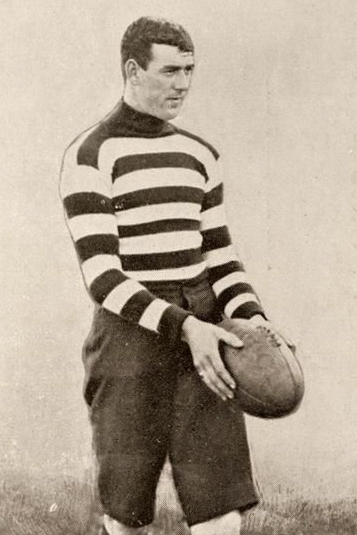
- Martini in 1910

Personal information
- Full name: Percy Francis Joseph Martini
- Born: 4 June 1888; Hawthorn, Victoria
- Died: 1 July 1961 (aged 73); East Geelong, Victoria
- Original team: Marylebone
- Height: 183 cm (6 ft 0 in)
- Weight: 85 kg (187 lb)

Playing career^{1}
Years	Club	Games (Goals)
1909–1915	Geelong	103 (262)
1916	Richmond	10 (22)
1917–1920	Geelong	46 (71)
Total		159 (355)
- ^{1} Playing statistics correct to the end of 1920.

Career highlights
- Geelong Leading Goalkicker 1909, 1910, 1911, 1912, 1913, 1914, 1915, 1918, 1919; VFL Leading Goalkicker 1910; Richmond Leading Goalkicker 1916; Interstate games:- 2

Percy Francis Joseph Martini (4 June 1888 – 1 July 1961) was an Australian rules footballer who played for Geelong in the Victorian Football League (VFL).

== Family ==
He married May Victoria Machar (1887–1928) in 1913.

== Football ==
A full-forward, from 1909 until 1919, he was Geelong's leading goalkicker in every season except 1915. In 1916, the club did not take part in the competition due to the war, and Martini played with Richmond for the season and topped their goalkicking.

With 51 goals in 1910, he became the first Geelong player to kick over 50 goals in a season, and it was the biggest tally in the league for the year, posthumously earning a Leading Goalkicker Medal for his efforts. When he retired in 1920, he had managed to kick 333 goals for Geelong, which at the time was a club record.

== Sources ==
- Hogan P: The Tigers of Old, Richmond FC, Melbourne 1996
