= Jack Williams (footballer, born 1902) =

Australian rules footballer

Personal information
- Born: 31 January 1902
- Died: 14 October 1976 (aged 74)
- Original team: Geelong West
- Debut: Round 1, 1925, Geelong vs. North Melbourne
- Height: 179 cm (5 ft 10 in)
- Weight: 76 kg (168 lb)

Playing career^{1}
Years	Club	Games (Goals)
1925–1934	Geelong	175 (9)

Coaching career
Years	Club	Games (W–L–D)
1945	Geelong	20 (2–18–0)
- ^{1} Playing statistics correct to the end of 1934.

Jack Williams (31 January 1902 – 14 October 1976) was an Australian rules footballer who played with Geelong in the Victorian Football League (VFL).

Local boy Jack Williams played his first season in 1925 and finished the year in Geelong's inaugural premiership winning side. He spent most of his career either on a wing or across halfback and played in another premiership in 1931. Williams represented the Victorian interstate team on one occasion. He retired in 1934 but returned to Geelong in 1945 as coach for a season, which brought just two wins.
