= Doug Wade =

Australian rules football player

Personal information
- Full name: Douglas Graeme Wade
- Born: 16 October 1941 (age 85); Horsham, Victoria
- Original team: Horsham (WFL)
- Height: 188 cm (6 ft 2 in)
- Weight: 102 kg (225 lb)

Playing career^{1}
Years	Club	Games (Goals)
1961 – 1972	Geelong	208 (834)
1973 – 1975	North Melbourne	59 (223)
Total		267 (1057)
- ^{1} Playing statistics correct to the end of 1975.

Career highlights
- 2x VFL Premiership player: (1963, 1975); 4x Coleman Medallist: (1962, 1967, 1969, 1974); Carji Greeves Medal: (1969); 11x Geelong leading goalkicker: (1961, 1962, 1963, 1964, 1966, 1967, 1968, 1969, 1970, 1971, 1972); 3x North Melbourne leading goalkicker: (1973, 1974, 1975); Geelong Team of the Century; Victorian representative (7 games, 31 goals).

Douglas Graeme Wade (born 16 October 1941) is a former Australian rules footballer who played for the Geelong Football Club and North Melbourne Football Club in the Victorian Football League (VFL).

He was the League's leading goal scorer (winning the Coleman Medal) on four occasions from 1962 until 1974. He was only the second player (after Collingwood's Gordon Coventry), and the first post-WW2 to kick over 1,000 goals in his career. Only four other players – Gary Ablett Snr (Hawthorn/Geelong), Jason Dunstall (Hawthorn), Tony Lockett (St Kilda/Sydney) and Lance Franklin (Hawthorn/Sydney) have emulated the effort.

== Geelong career ==
After working for the CBC bank of Sydney at the age of 17 years, he tried out with the Melbourne Football Club in a number of practice games in 1960. Wade returned home to Horsham where he was playing with the Horsham football club. In 1961 Wade was lured back by the Geelong Football Club where he made his VFL/AFL debut. Wade was a member of the Geelong side which won the VFL Premiership in 1963, and a Grand Final player in 1967.

Wade was involved in one of the most memorable umpiring decisions in VFL history. In the 1962 Preliminary Final Replay, Geelong was trailing Carlton by five points with seconds remaining. The ball came down to Wade and Carlton full-back Peter Barry, and Wade out-manoeuvered Barry to mark 25 metres out in front; but umpire Irving penalised Wade, who was in front, for holding on to Barry's shorts in the contest. Wade said: "All I did was to keep my eyes on the ball and maneuvered for position. The only possible way he could have penalised me was for sticking out my posterior as I went to mark." Percy Beames wrote in The Age: "Wade was extremely unlucky. Nine times out of ten these incidents are overlooked." Former umpire Allen Nash said at the time:" It was the most courageous decision I've ever seen by an umpire."

In the final minutes of a match against South Melbourne late in 1970, Wade had a shot at goal to put Geelong in front. A spectator threw an apple on the field, which collided with the football in mid-air as it dropped between Wade's hand and foot, and knocked the football clear off of his boot which then failed to even connect with the ball. The umpire, faced with an unprecedented circumstance, signalled 'play on'. South Melbourne's key defender, John Rantall (later to be a teammate of Wade when they both crossed to North Melbourne in 1973/4) picked up the ball and cleared it down field. South Melbourne scored a goal on the rebound and won the game by 7 points. They went on to make it into the finals for the first time since 1945. Geelong had started the game one win and percentage behind South Melbourne, and this loss seriously damaged their chance of making the finals, which they went on to miss for the first time since 1961. The umpire's 'play on' decision was considered valid, since there was no rule at the time to account for this kind of 'spectator interference'. South Melbourne went on to lose to St Kilda in the semi-final.

== North Melbourne career ==
At the end of the 1972 season, the VFL introduced a form of free agency known as the "10-year rule", which allowed players with ten years' service at one club to move to another club without a clearance. Wade, along with Essendon's Barry Davis and South Melbourne's John Rantall, joined North Melbourne.

He kicked 73 goals in his first season at North Melbourne, and was then a key member of their side which contested the Grand Final against Richmond in 1974. Wade kicked 103 goals in that season, becoming the third former Geelong player to head the VFL goal-kicking table after transferring to another club.

Wade holds a record for one of the biggest (VFL) scoring quarters by an individual, when he kicked 7 goals in the last quarter against Collingwood at Arden Street in 1974. Up until the last quarter Wade had been kept virtually quiet, by Doug Gott of Collingwood, despite North Melbourne's high goal scoring record against the Magpies at the 3rd quarter. Wade kicked seven goals and North Melbourne's total of 25 goals broke a club record against Collingwood at the time.

The following year (1975) Wade struggled to find form largely due to fitness and weight. Near the end of the home and away season, Wade was becoming a liability because of his dwindling goal scores. However, on the Thursday before the Grand Final Wade pleaded with coach Ron Barassi and the selection committee to be selected into the side. Based on Wade's finals experience and Wade's offer or tactic to stay behind the pack to crumb goals, Wade convinced selectors to name him in the side instead of Robert Smith, who was a top reserves full-forward: who was fit and ready to take his place. However, in the 1975 Grand Final, Wade's experience proved to be an essential part of North's huge win over Hawthorn. The tactic of staying behind the pack worked and Wade scored a few goals doing this. He even missed an easy shot as the pack of players missed the ball and an open goal was for the taking. Wade's miss was a shock to the crowd and himself. However, his inspirational gestures to the North Melbourne forwards can be seen in the 1975 Grand final, especially the last quarter, when he hurriedly and unselfishly passes the ball to teammates. Wade finished his career on a high note (another Premiership) where many experts could not have predicted, proving that Wade was true champion player for both Geelong and North Melbourne.

In 1996 Wade was inducted into the Australian Football Hall of Fame.

== VFL statistics ==
Legend
G	Goals	K	Kicks	D	Disposals	T	Tackles
B	Behinds	H	Handballs	M	Marks

Led the league for the season only
Led the league after finals only
Led the league after season and finals

Season	Team	No.	Games	Totals							Averages (per game)						
Season	Team	No.	Games	G	B	K	H	D	M	T	G	B	K	H	D	M	T
1961	Geelong	23	16	51	—N/a	—N/a	—N/a	—N/a	—N/a	—N/a	3.2	—N/a	—N/a	—N/a	—N/a	—N/a	—N/a
1962	Geelong	23	17	68	—N/a	—N/a	—N/a	—N/a	—N/a	—N/a	4.0	—N/a	—N/a	—N/a	—N/a	—N/a	—N/a
1963	Geelong	23	16	48	—N/a	—N/a	—N/a	—N/a	—N/a	—N/a	3.0	—N/a	—N/a	—N/a	—N/a	—N/a	—N/a
1964	Geelong	23	13	41	—N/a	—N/a	—N/a	—N/a	—N/a	—N/a	3.2	—N/a	—N/a	—N/a	—N/a	—N/a	—N/a
1965	Geelong	23	10	29	28	80	8	88	46	—N/a	2.9	2.8	8.0	0.8	8.8	4.6	—N/a
1966	Geelong	23	17	52	43	150	41	191	76	—N/a	3.1	2.5	8.8	2.4	11.2	4.5	—N/a
1967	Geelong	23	20	96	60	197	36	233	118	—N/a	4.8	3.0	9.9	1.8	11.7	5.9	—N/a
1968	Geelong	23	20	64	51	197	36	233	120	—N/a	3.2	2.6	9.9	1.8	11.7	6.0	—N/a
1969	Geelong	23	21	127	75	239	32	271	139	—N/a	6.0	3.6	11.4	1.5	12.9	6.6	—N/a
1970	Geelong	23	18	74	43	151	33	184	88	—N/a	4.1	2.4	8.4	1.8	10.2	4.9	—N/a
1971	Geelong	23	19	94	44	169	29	198	104	—N/a	4.9	2.3	8.9	1.5	10.4	5.5	—N/a
1972	Geelong	23	21	90	59	185	24	209	111	—N/a	4.3	2.8	8.8	1.1	10.0	5.3	—N/a
1973	North Melbourne	2	20	73	41	147	44	191	88	—N/a	3.7	2.1	7.4	2.2	9.6	4.4	—N/a
1974	North Melbourne	2	24	103	47	178	32	210	103	—N/a	4.3	2.0	7.4	1.3	8.8	4.3	—N/a
1975	North Melbourne	2	15	47	32	91	31	122	49	—N/a	3.1	2.1	6.1	2.1	8.1	3.3	—N/a
Career			267	1057	523	1784	346	2130	1042	—N/a	4.0	2.6	8.7	1.7	10.4	5.1	—N/a
