= Tom Morrow (footballer) =

Australian rules footballer

Personal information
- Full name: Thomas Morrow
- Born: 8 October 1923; Geelong, Victoria
- Died: 18 June 2002 (aged 78)
- Original team: North Geelong (GDFL)
- Debut: Round 1, 1946 vs. Melbourne, at Punt Road Oval
- Height: 193 cm (6 ft 4 in)
- Weight: 89 kg (196 lb)

Playing career^{1}
| Years | Club | Games (Goals) |
| 1946–1952 | Geelong | 120 (58) |
- ^{1} Playing statistics correct to the end of 1952.

Career highlights
- 1951 VFL Premiership; Victorian representative: Twice

Thomas Morrow (8 October 1923 – 18 June 2002) was an Australian rules footballer in the Victorian Football League (VFL).

Prior to playing with Geelong, Morrow served in the Australian Army during World War II.

== See also ==
- 1951 VFL season
