= Lindsay White =

Australian rules footballer

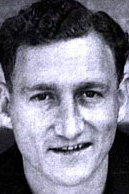

Personal information
- Full name: Lindsay G. White
- Born: 5 January 1922
- Died: 13 March 1977 (aged 55)
- Original team: Orford
- Height: 185 cm (6 ft 1 in)
- Weight: 83 kg (183 lb)

Playing career^{1}
Years	Club	Games (Goals)
1941	Geelong	17 (67)
1942–1943	South Melbourne	25 (111)
1944–1950	Geelong	100 (362)
Total		142 (540)
- ^{1} Playing statistics correct to the end of 1950.

Career highlights
- Geelong best and fairest – 1947; Geelong captain – 1945, 1948 & 1950; Geelong leading goalkicker – 1941, 1944, 1947, 1948 & 1949; South Melbourne leading goalkicker – 1942; VFL leading goalkicker – 1942 & 1948

Lindsay G. White (5 January 1922 – 13 March 1977) was an Australian rules footballer who represented Geelong and South Melbourne in the Victorian Football League (VFL) during the 1940s.

White was regarded as one of the best forwards of the 1940s. He was fast on the lead, was a strong overhead mark and possessed a long and accurate kick.

He kicked 67 goals in 1941, his debut season for Geelong, but at the end of the year Geelong went into temporary recess due to travel restrictions during World War II and White transferred to South Melbourne. He spent two seasons there, kicking 111 goals in 25 games and leading the league goalkicking in 1942. White returned to Geelong for the start of the 1944 season and was named club captain in 1948. In that year he again won the league goalkicking, with 86 goals.

White played until halfway through the 1950 season, retiring due to a debilitating injury to his achilles tendon.

He was playing coach of the Queanbeyan-Acton side that were premiers in the 1956 Canberra Australian National Football League season. In the grand final win over Manuka, White kicked the two goals needed to bring his season tally to 100 goals.
