= Bert Taylor (footballer, born 1900) =

Australian rules footballer

Personal information
- Full name: Gilbert Roy Taylor
- Born: 9 July 1900; Allansford, Victoria
- Died: 1 April 1980 (aged 79); Vermont, Victoria
- Original team: Warragul
- Height: 183 cm (6 ft 0 in)
- Weight: 87 kg (192 lb)
- Position: Defender

Playing career^{1}
| Years | Club | Games (Goals) |
| 1919–1922 | Fitzroy | 50 (7) |
| 1924–1925 | West Perth (WAFL) | |
| 1926–1927 | Geelong A (VFA) | 34 (7) |
| 1928–1931 | Preston (VFA) | 75 (19) |

Coaching career
| Years | Club | Games (W–L–D) |
| 1923 | Geelong | 17 (9–8–0) |
- ^{1} Playing statistics correct to the end of 1922.

Gilbert Roy Taylor (9 July 1900 – 1 April 1980) was an Australian rules footballer who played for Fitzroy and coached Geelong in the Victorian Football League (VFL).

Originally from Warragul, Taylor spent four seasons at Fitzroy where he played as a defender. His last league game was the 1922 Grand Final win, in which he starred from the back pocket. A policeman, he had been transferred to Geelong in 1922 but having failed to gain a clearance from Fitzroy he left the club after the Grand Final. The following season he joined Geelong as non playing coach and steered the club to the finals.

In 1924 he went to Western Australia and played for West Perth for two years, winning selection for Western Australia in their 1924 Hobart Carnival team. He returned to Victoria in 1926 as playing coach for the Geelong Association side in the Victorian Football Association. In 1928 he became player-coach of Preston.
