= Geoff Ainsworth =

Australian rules footballer

Personal information
- Born: 27 May 1946
- Died: 2 February 2011 (aged 64)
- Original team: University Blues
- Height: 178 cm (5 ft 10 in)
- Weight: 79 kg (174 lb)

Playing career^{1}
Years	Club	Games (Goals)
1967–1974	Geelong	135 (3)
- ^{1} Playing statistics correct to the end of 1974.

Geoffrey William Ainsworth (27 May 1946 – 2 February 2011) was an Australian rules footballer who played with Geelong in the Victorian Football League (VFL) during the late 1960s and early 1970s.

== History ==
The son of a local lawyer, William Charles Ainsworth, Geoff matriculated to the University of Melbourne in 1965, where he was resident at Trinity College. He represented the college in tennis, athletics, cricket and football, and also played football with the University Blues, where he was noticed by the senior teams.

Ainsworth played in jersey no. 25 with Geelong, who used him as a defender in the back pocket over the course of his eight-season career. He was a member of Geelong's losing 1967 VFL Grand Final side in his first year at the club. After missing all but one game of the 1971 season because he was travelling in Europe, Ainsworth went on to become club captain in 1973. He lost the captaincy the following season and retired at the end of the year, aged only 28, in order to concentrate on his legal career.

During his career Ainsworth polled a total of five Brownlow Medal votes. In 1976, he was made a life member of the Geelong Football Club. Ainsworth died on 2 February 2011.
