= Jim Fitzgerald (footballer) =

Australian rules footballer

Personal information
- Full name: James Fitzgerald
- Born: 14 December 1924
- Died: 6 June 2003 (aged 78)
- Original team: CYMS Geelong
- Height: 178 cm (5 ft 10 in)
- Weight: 92 kg (203 lb)

Playing career^{1}
Years	Club	Games (Goals)
1944–1950	Geelong	108 (14)
1951–1952	St Kilda	14 (0)
Total		122 (14)
- ^{1} Playing statistics correct to the end of 1952.

Jim Fitzgerald (14 December 1924 – 6 June 2003) was an Australian rules footballer who played with Geelong and St Kilda in the VFL.

A backman, Fitzgerald was a best and fairest winner for Geelong in 1945 and briefly captained them during the 1949 season. He finished his career at St Kilda before retiring in 1952.
