= Harold Craven =

Australian rules footballer and umpire

Personal information
- Full name: Thomas Harold Craven
- Born: 26 April 1895; Geelong, Victoria
- Died: 26 November 1970 (aged 75); Prahran, Victoria
- Original team: Newtown
- Height: 174 cm (5 ft 9 in)
- Weight: 76 kg (168 lb)
- Position: Fullback

Playing career^{1}
Years	Club	Games (Goals)
1915, 1917–1924	Geelong	88 (17)
- ^{1} Playing statistics correct to the end of Round 15, 2008.

Career highlights
- Geelong Captain 1921-1922

Thomas Harold Craven (26 April 1895 – 26 November 1970) was a player for Geelong in the VFL between 1915 and 1924. He captained the club in 1921 and 1922. Despite his small size, he played most of his career at full back. He was a boundary umpire for two league games in 1931.
