= Colin Rice =

Australian rules footballer

Personal information
- Full name: Colin Walter Rice
- Born: 16 July 1938 (age 88)
- Original team: Swan Hill
- Height: 170 cm (5 ft 7 in)
- Weight: 71 kg (157 lb)

Playing career^{1}
Years	Club	Games (Goals)
1957–1963	Geelong	97 (87)
- ^{1} Playing statistics correct to the end of 1963.

Colin Walter Rice (born 16 July 1938) is a former Australian rules footballer who played with Geelong in the Victorian Football League (VFL).

Rice made his debut for Geelong in 1957 and was capable of playing in both the back pocket and as a rover. He won the Carji Greeves Medal for Geelong's best and fairest player in 1959 and captained the club for part of 1960. Rice became a premiership player with his last game in the league, the 1963 grand final.

The following season he moved to Glenelg in the South Australian National Football League (SANFL) and was their Club Champion in his debut season.

He later played with the South Bendigo Football Club and won a Michelsen Medal in 1968 and was captain-coach of their 1969 Bendigo Football League premiership team.
