= George Gniel =

Australian rules footballer, born 1919

Personal information
- Full name: George Christian Gniel
- Born: 6 April 1919; Hopetoun, Victoria
- Died: 12 September 1989 (aged 70); Geelong, Victoria
- Original team: Guild Scouts
- Debut: Round 1, 1939, Geelong vs. Collingwood, at Victoria Park
- Height: 183 cm (6 ft 0 in)
- Weight: 80.5 kg (177 lb)

Playing career^{1}
| Years | Club | Games (Goals) |
| 1939–1941 | Geelong | 51 (3) |
| 1942–1943 | Carlton | 29 (0) |
| 1944–1947 | Geelong | 63 (8) |
| Total | | 143 (11) |
- ^{1} Playing statistics correct to the end of 1947.

George Christian Gniel (6 April 1919 – 12 September 1989) was an Australian rules footballer in the Victorian Football League (VFL).

Gniel debuted in the VFL for Geelong. He was recruited by the Carlton Football Club and made his debut for the Blues in round 2 of the 1942 season. After winning the best and fairest award in 1943 he decided to leave the Blues and return to Geelong to finish his career, being named captain in 1947. The next year Gneil was cleared to Tasmania to coach and play with APPM club in the NWFU. He remained in that region until 1950, also being chosen to represent the NWFU in intrastate matches.
