= Jack Grant (footballer, born 1915) =

Australian rules footballer

Personal information
- Full name: John William Grant
- Born: 24 September 1915
- Died: 1 December 1983 (aged 68)
- Original team: Chilwell (GDFL)
- Height: 183 cm (6 ft 0 in)
- Weight: 82 kg (181 lb)

Playing career^{1}
Years	Club	Games (Goals)
1935–1941	Geelong	99 (71)
1942–1943	Fitzroy	26 (58)
1945–1946	Geelong	20 (28)
Total		145 (157)
- ^{1} Playing statistics correct to the end of 1946.

John William Grant (24 September 1915 – 1 December 1983) was an Australian rules footballer who played for the Geelong Football Club and Fitzroy Football Club in the Victorian Football League (VFL).

== Family ==
He married Dulcie May Ellis (?–1989), in Geelong, on Saturday, 29 April 1939. He died on 1 December 1983, and was buried at Mount Duneed Cemetery, Mount Duneed, Victoria.

== Stawell Gift ==
He had exceptional pace, winning the 1938 130-yard Stawell Gift in eleven and eleven-sixteenths of a second, off a handicap of 11½ yards.

== Football ==
Grant usually played on the half forward or half back flank.

A member of Geelong's premiership team in 1937, Grant won their best and fairest award in 1939. He was their leading goalkicker in 1940, with 47 goals. In 1942 he moved to Fitzroy and spent two seasons with the club, topping their goalkicking in 1942 with 43 goals. He returned to Geelong in 1945 and captained them the following season.

== War service ==
He served in the RAAF. LAC Grant enlisted in February 1942, and was discharged, "on compassionate grounds", in June 1945.
