= Jack Butcher =

Australian rules footballer

Personal information
- Full name: Edward Jack Butcher
- Born: 28 October 1914
- Died: 26 February 1978 (aged 63)
- Original team: Drysdale
- Height: 175 cm (5 ft 9 in)
- Weight: 80 kg (176 lb)
- Position: Half back

Playing career^{1}
Years	Club	Games (Goals)
1938–1941, 1944–1945	Geelong	86 (18)
1942–1943	South Melbourne	32 (16)
Total		118 (34)
- ^{1} Playing statistics correct to the end of 1945.

Career highlights
- Geelong captain 1944–1945

Edward Jack Butcher (28 October 1914 – 26 February 1978) was a player for Geelong and South Melbourne in the VFL between 1938 and 1945. He was a left-footer who could play in many different positions, but played his best football at half-back.

Butcher played several seasons for Geelong and, when Geelong were forced into recess due to World War II, he crossed to South Melbourne. After Geelong rejoined the league, Butcher returned and captained the club in 1944 and 1945. He retired during the 1945 season.
