= Billy Orchard =

Personal information
- Full name: William Henry Orchard
- Born: 9 August 1888; Geelong, Victoria
- Died: 22 July 1965 (aged 76); Geelong, Victoria
- Original team: Geelong Grammar
- Debut: Round 16, 1906, Geelong vs. Carlton, at Corio Oval
- Height: 180 cm (5 ft 11 in)
- Weight: 76 kg (168 lb)

Playing career^{1}
Years	Club	Games (Goals)
1906, 1908–1915	Geelong	112 (67)

Coaching career
Years	Club	Games (W–L–D)
1914	Geelong	18 (11–6–1)
- ^{1} Playing statistics correct to the end of 1915.

Career highlights
- AIF Pioneer Exhibition Game, London, 28 October 1916

William Henry Orchard MC (9 August 1888 – 22 July 1965) was an Australian rules football player for the Geelong Football Club between 1906 and 1915. He served in the First AIF. He was awarded a Military Cross.

== Family ==
The son of Edwin Orchard (1863–1927) and Ruth Orchard (1866–1938), née Mallett, he was born on 9 August 1888. He married Henrietta Jessie Galbraith (1895–1966) on 21 July 1915; they had three children, William, Douglas, and June.

== Football ==
=== Geelong (VFL) ===
He was Geelong's captained for two seasons: 1914 and 1915. He was also playing coach in 1914.

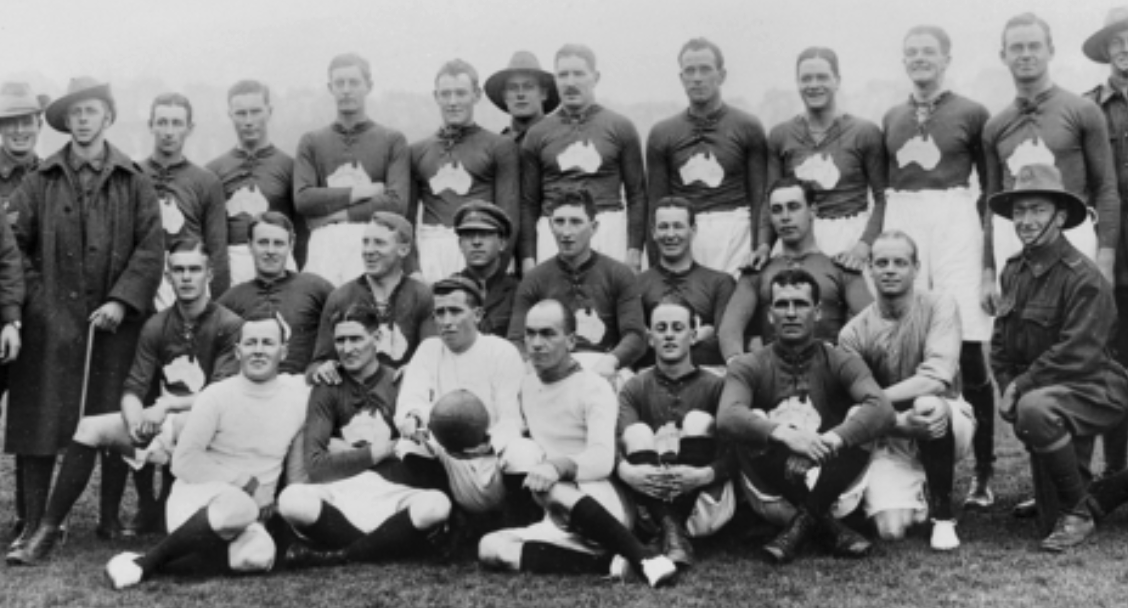
The Third Australian Divisional Team: 28 October 1916. Billy Orchard is the second player from the left, in the back row.

=== Third Divisional team (AIF) ===
He played for the (winning) Third Australian Divisional team in the famous "Pioneer Exhibition Game" of Australian Rules football, held in London, in October 1916. A news film was taken at the match.

== Field Umpire ==
He was a field umpire in the Victorian Football League (VFL) during the 1920s.

== Cricket ==
Orchard was an outstanding cricketer taking 264 wickets at 12.6 between 1903 and 1936 in the Geelong Cricket Association.

== Military career ==
In 1918 at Ypres he was awarded the Military Cross for "the efficient manner in which he (Captain Orchard) carried out his task of reorganisation and his cheerfulness under depressing circumstances that earned for him the Military Cross."

== See also ==
- 1916 Pioneer Exhibition Game
