= 1974 VFL season =

78th season of the Victorian Football League (VFL)

1974 VFL premiership season
- Teams: 12
- Premiers: Richmond; 9th premiership
- Minor premiers: Richmond; 7th minor premiership
- Brownlow Medallist: Keith Greig (North Melbourne)
- Coleman Medallist: Doug Wade (North Melbourne)

Attendance
- Matches played: 138
- Total attendance: 3,243,600 (23,504 per match)
- Highest: 113,839

The 1974 VFL season was the 78th season of the Victorian Football League (VFL), the highest level senior Australian rules football competition in Victoria. The season featured twelve clubs, ran from 6 April until 28 September, and comprised a 22-game home-and-away season followed by a finals series featuring the top five clubs.

The premiership was won by the Richmond Football Club for the ninth time and second time consecutively, after it defeated North Melbourne by 41 points in the 1974 VFL Grand Final.

== Background ==
In 1974, the VFL competition consisted of twelve teams of 18 on-the-field players each, plus two substitute players, known as the 19th man and the 20th man. A player could be substituted for any reason; however, once substituted, a player could not return to the field of play under any circumstances.

Teams played each other in a home-and-away season of 22 rounds; matches 12 to 22 were the "home-and-way reverse" of matches 1 to 11.

Once the 22 round home-and-away season had finished, the 1974 VFL Premiers were determined by the specific format and conventions of the "McIntyre final five system".

== Home-and-away season ==
=== Round 1 ===
Home team	Home team score	Away team	Away team score	Venue	Crowd	Date
Footscray	16.14 (110)	Geelong	9.11 (65)	Western Oval	15,204	6 April 1974
Collingwood	17.15 (117)	Essendon	15.10 (100)	Victoria Park	30,493	6 April 1974
Carlton	14.13 (97)	Melbourne	6.12 (48)	Princes Park	16,562	6 April 1974
South Melbourne	15.10 (100)	North Melbourne	11.14 (80)	Lake Oval	10,744	6 April 1974
Richmond	12.16 (88)	Hawthorn	15.14 (104)	MCG	38,735	6 April 1974
St Kilda	11.17 (83)	Fitzroy	6.7 (43)	Moorabbin Oval	17,286	6 April 1974

=== Round 2 ===
Home team	Home team score	Away team	Away team score	Venue	Crowd	Date
Fitzroy	9.13 (67)	Richmond	15.26 (116)	Junction Oval	17,040	13 April 1974
Hawthorn	6.12 (48)	Collingwood	10.11 (71)	Princes Park	28,689	13 April 1974
Geelong	15.7 (97)	Carlton	12.16 (88)	Kardinia Park	21,043	13 April 1974
Melbourne	11.20 (86)	St Kilda	14.16 (100)	MCG	36,708	15 April 1974
Essendon	21.24 (150)	South Melbourne	10.18 (78)	Windy Hill	25,348	15 April 1974
North Melbourne	20.12 (132)	Footscray	11.9 (75)	Arden Street Oval	21,358	15 April 1974

=== Round 3 ===
Home team	Home team score	Away team	Away team score	Venue	Crowd	Date
Collingwood	16.16 (112)	Footscray	14.15 (99)	Victoria Park	23,233	20 April 1974
Carlton	11.15 (81)	Richmond	18.11 (119)	Princes Park	33,050	20 April 1974
South Melbourne	8.18 (66)	Hawthorn	20.15 (135)	Lake Oval	12,157	20 April 1974
Melbourne	16.10 (106)	Geelong	16.14 (110)	MCG	21,041	20 April 1974
North Melbourne	17.18 (120)	Fitzroy	7.11 (53)	Arden Street Oval	21,358	20 April 1974
Essendon	16.14 (110)	St Kilda	15.15 (105)	VFL Park	35,064	20 April 1974

=== Round 4 ===
Home team	Home team score	Away team	Away team score	Venue	Crowd	Date
Fitzroy	18.12 (120)	Collingwood	17.9 (111)	Junction Oval	28,471	25 April 1974
North Melbourne	19.9 (123)	Carlton	6.15 (51)	VFL Park	54,086	25 April 1974
Geelong	6.9 (45)	St Kilda	8.13 (61)	Kardinia Park	18,550	27 April 1974
Footscray	15.6 (96)	South Melbourne	7.9 (51)	Western Oval	12,491	27 April 1974
Richmond	13.16 (94)	Melbourne	9.15 (69)	MCG	28,080	27 April 1974
Hawthorn	9.15 (69)	Essendon	5.13 (43)	Princes Park	17,590	27 April 1974

=== Round 5 ===
Home team	Home team score	Away team	Away team score	Venue	Crowd	Date
Melbourne	13.11 (89)	North Melbourne	19.15 (129)	MCG	23,616	4 May 1974
Essendon	12.26 (98)	Geelong	10.14 (74)	Windy Hill	19,123	4 May 1974
St Kilda	13.12 (90)	Richmond	15.20 (110)	Moorabbin Oval	30,673	4 May 1974
South Melbourne	14.16 (100)	Fitzroy	15.10 (100)	Lake Oval	10,316	4 May 1974
Collingwood	13.14 (92)	Carlton	10.14 (74)	Victoria Park	33,452	4 May 1974
Hawthorn	8.14 (62)	Footscray	11.19 (85)	VFL Park	20,281	4 May 1974

=== Round 6 ===
Home team	Home team score	Away team	Away team score	Venue	Crowd	Date
North Melbourne	22.20 (152)	St Kilda	9.5 (59)	Arden Street Oval	17,545	11 May 1974
Fitzroy	18.16 (124)	Hawthorn	13.16 (94)	Junction Oval	10,583	11 May 1974
Carlton	19.21 (135)	South Melbourne	12.9 (81)	Princes Park	19,902	11 May 1974
Richmond	17.11 (113)	Geelong	18.15 (123)	MCG	31,483	11 May 1974
Footscray	17.12 (114)	Essendon	8.16 (64)	Western Oval	26,309	11 May 1974
Collingwood	13.11 (89)	Melbourne	12.7 (79)	VFL Park	25,161	11 May 1974

=== Round 7 ===
Home team	Home team score	Away team	Away team score	Venue	Crowd	Date
Geelong	9.5 (59)	North Melbourne	13.12 (90)	Kardinia Park	24,685	18 May 1974
Essendon	15.15 (105)	Richmond	16.19 (115)	Windy Hill	24,376	18 May 1974
South Melbourne	13.16 (94)	Melbourne	11.10 (76)	Lake Oval	10,239	18 May 1974
St Kilda	12.10 (82)	Collingwood	11.22 (88)	Moorabbin Oval	27,876	18 May 1974
Hawthorn	13.22 (100)	Carlton	8.12 (60)	Princes Park	21,202	18 May 1974
Footscray	12.15 (87)	Fitzroy	8.12 (60)	VFL Park	19,450	18 May 1974

=== Round 8 ===
Home team	Home team score	Away team	Away team score	Venue	Crowd	Date
North Melbourne	9.16 (70)	Richmond	13.17 (95)	Arden Street Oval	22,841	25 May 1974
Collingwood	11.14 (80)	Geelong	18.13 (121)	Victoria Park	22,858	25 May 1974
Carlton	9.12 (66)	Footscray	9.12 (66)	Princes Park	20,830	25 May 1974
Melbourne	6.15 (51)	Hawthorn	13.21 (99)	MCG	18,029	25 May 1974
Fitzroy	16.11 (107)	Essendon	14.15 (99)	Junction Oval	15,516	25 May 1974
South Melbourne	8.9 (57)	St Kilda	10.10 (70)	VFL Park	16,516	25 May 1974

=== Round 9 ===
Home team	Home team score	Away team	Away team score	Venue	Crowd	Date
Hawthorn	18.15 (123)	St Kilda	10.16 (76)	Princes Park	12,630	1 June 1974
Geelong	16.12 (108)	South Melbourne	17.7 (109)	Kardinia Park	15,664	1 June 1974
Footscray	13.16 (94)	Melbourne	8.8 (56)	Western Oval	15,415	1 June 1974
North Melbourne	11.15 (81)	Essendon	16.15 (111)	Arden Street Oval	20,027	1 June 1974
Richmond	9.20 (74)	Collingwood	21.17 (143)	MCG	66,829	1 June 1974
Fitzroy	7.10 (52)	Carlton	16.15 (111)	VFL Park	19,906	1 June 1974

=== Round 10 ===
Home team	Home team score	Away team	Away team score	Venue	Crowd	Date
Collingwood	12.10 (82)	North Melbourne	8.15 (63)	Victoria Park	25,892	8 June 1974
South Melbourne	9.13 (67)	Richmond	23.9 (147)	Lake Oval	12,054	8 June 1974
St Kilda	9.9 (63)	Footscray	11.10 (76)	Moorabbin Oval	17,667	8 June 1974
Melbourne	19.10 (124)	Fitzroy	13.15 (93)	MCG	12,414	8 June 1974
Essendon	9.14 (68)	Carlton	16.7 (103)	Windy Hill	24,436	8 June 1974
Hawthorn	14.13 (97)	Geelong	10.6 (66)	VFL Park	18,562	8 June 1974

=== Round 11 ===
Home team	Home team score	Away team	Away team score	Venue	Crowd	Date
Carlton	20.13 (133)	St Kilda	13.10 (88)	Princes Park	26,030	15 June 1974
South Melbourne	10.13 (73)	Collingwood	15.14 (104)	Lake Oval	16,908	15 June 1974
Melbourne	10.10 (70)	Essendon	15.15 (105)	VFL Park	21,396	15 June 1974
North Melbourne	14.11 (95)	Hawthorn	9.21 (75)	Arden Street Oval	17,368	17 June 1974
Richmond	19.19 (133)	Footscray	15.11 (101)	MCG	68,446	17 June 1974
Geelong	10.15 (75)	Fitzroy	10.13 (73)	Kardinia Park	18,396	17 June 1974

=== Round 12 ===
Home team	Home team score	Away team	Away team score	Venue	Crowd	Date
North Melbourne	28.17 (185)	South Melbourne	12.7 (79)	Arden Street Oval	9,016	22 June 1974
Hawthorn	19.17 (131)	Richmond	15.18 (108)	Princes Park	15,710	22 June 1974
Fitzroy	13.14 (92)	St Kilda	12.15 (87)	Junction Oval	12,519	22 June 1974
Essendon	13.12 (90)	Collingwood	19.9 (123)	Windy Hill	25,867	22 June 1974
Melbourne	11.13 (79)	Carlton	15.18 (108)	MCG	23,336	22 June 1974
Geelong	13.14 (92)	Footscray	8.10 (58)	VFL Park	16,320	22 June 1974

=== Round 13 ===
Home team	Home team score	Away team	Away team score	Venue	Crowd	Date
Footscray	11.14 (80)	North Melbourne	19.10 (124)	Western Oval	20,937	29 June 1974
Collingwood	13.18 (96)	Hawthorn	13.12 (90)	Victoria Park	26,028	29 June 1974
Carlton	20.19 (139)	Geelong	10.6 (66)	Princes Park	23,490	29 June 1974
St Kilda	11.13 (79)	Melbourne	13.10 (88)	Moorabbin Oval	13,804	29 June 1974
South Melbourne	11.16 (82)	Essendon	14.12 (96)	Lake Oval	10,494	29 June 1974
Richmond	29.21 (195)	Fitzroy	9.12 (66)	VFL Park	16,455	29 June 1974

=== Round 14 ===
Home team	Home team score	Away team	Away team score	Venue	Crowd	Date
Melbourne	11.24 (90)	Richmond	23.15 (153)	MCG	21,146	6 July 1974
Essendon	11.9 (75)	Hawthorn	23.17 (155)	Windy Hill	16,493	6 July 1974
Collingwood	24.14 (158)	Fitzroy	19.13 (127)	Victoria Park	17,913	6 July 1974
Carlton	10.12 (72)	North Melbourne	18.13 (121)	Princes Park	27,600	6 July 1974
South Melbourne	19.27 (141)	Footscray	12.19 (91)	Lake Oval	9,739	6 July 1974
St Kilda	12.20 (92)	Geelong	11.12 (78)	VFL Park	13,926	6 July 1974

=== Round 15 ===
Home team	Home team score	Away team	Away team score	Venue	Crowd	Date
Hawthorn	16.14 (110)	South Melbourne	4.7 (31)	Princes Park	7,075	13 July 1974
Geelong	12.11 (83)	Melbourne	9.9 (63)	Kardinia Park	10,873	13 July 1974
St Kilda	16.13 (109)	Essendon	10.8 (68)	Moorabbin Oval	14,244	13 July 1974
Footscray	6.10 (46)	Collingwood	7.12 (54)	Western Oval	18,515	13 July 1974
Richmond	15.15 (105)	Carlton	11.9 (75)	MCG	36,417	13 July 1974
Fitzroy	8.7 (55)	North Melbourne	10.8 (68)	VFL Park	7,615	13 July 1974

=== Round 16 ===
Home team	Home team score	Away team	Away team score	Venue	Crowd	Date
Richmond	15.24 (114)	St Kilda	11.13 (79)	MCG	28,045	20 July 1974
Footscray	8.12 (60)	Hawthorn	12.9 (81)	Western Oval	15,299	20 July 1974
Fitzroy	10.13 (73)	South Melbourne	19.19 (133)	Junction Oval	8,110	20 July 1974
North Melbourne	19.14 (128)	Melbourne	9.10 (64)	Arden Street Oval	9,094	20 July 1974
Geelong	11.11 (77)	Essendon	14.9 (93)	Kardinia Park	15,897	20 July 1974
Carlton	18.10 (118)	Collingwood	13.4 (82)	VFL Park	47,558	20 July 1974

=== Round 17 ===
Home team	Home team score	Away team	Away team score	Venue	Crowd	Date
Essendon	9.10 (64)	Footscray	13.15 (93)	Windy Hill	16,250	27 July 1974
St Kilda	10.13 (73)	North Melbourne	11.16 (82)	Moorabbin Oval	15,954	27 July 1974
Hawthorn	13.28 (106)	Fitzroy	8.10 (58)	Princes Park	6,198	27 July 1974
Melbourne	15.21 (111)	Collingwood	17.13 (115)	MCG	22,893	27 July 1974
South Melbourne	14.17 (101)	Carlton	11.14 (80)	Lake Oval	14,114	27 July 1974
Geelong	8.9 (57)	Richmond	13.15 (93)	VFL Park	15,578	27 July 1974

=== Round 18 ===
Home team	Home team score	Away team	Away team score	Venue	Crowd	Date
Fitzroy	9.16 (70)	Footscray	14.9 (93)	Junction Oval	9,552	3 August 1974
Collingwood	13.10 (88)	St Kilda	13.16 (94)	Victoria Park	21,433	3 August 1974
Carlton	14.12 (96)	Hawthorn	18.12 (120)	Princes Park	23,180	3 August 1974
North Melbourne	15.9 (99)	Geelong	15.15 (105)	Arden Street Oval	10,638	3 August 1974
Richmond	20.15 (135)	Essendon	12.16 (88)	MCG	34,011	3 August 1974
Melbourne	11.17 (83)	South Melbourne	14.13 (97)	VFL Park	13,188	3 August 1974

=== Round 19 ===
Home team	Home team score	Away team	Away team score	Venue	Crowd	Date
St Kilda	9.13 (67)	South Melbourne	13.15 (93)	Moorabbin Oval	17,833	10 August 1974
Hawthorn	17.20 (122)	Melbourne	14.13 (97)	Princes Park	8,476	10 August 1974
Essendon	24.15 (159)	Fitzroy	8.13 (61)	Windy Hill	10,753	10 August 1974
Geelong	8.8 (56)	Collingwood	10.19 (79)	Kardinia Park	22,826	10 August 1974
Footscray	10.8 (68)	Carlton	4.20 (44)	Western Oval	28,151	10 August 1974
Richmond	15.12 (102)	North Melbourne	11.11 (77)	VFL Park	40,399	10 August 1974

=== Round 20 ===
Home team	Home team score	Away team	Away team score	Venue	Crowd	Date
Essendon	14.14 (98)	North Melbourne	16.12 (108)	Windy Hill	19,229	17 August 1974
Collingwood	10.20 (80)	Richmond	16.11 (107)	Victoria Park	36,729	17 August 1974
Carlton	17.14 (116)	Fitzroy	10.15 (75)	Princes Park	13,400	17 August 1974
South Melbourne	13.7 (85)	Geelong	12.14 (86)	Lake Oval	12,176	17 August 1974
Melbourne	10.15 (75)	Footscray	23.21 (159)	MCG	17,951	17 August 1974
St Kilda	11.9 (75)	Hawthorn	16.12 (108)	VFL Park	21,561	17 August 1974

=== Round 21 ===
Home team	Home team score	Away team	Away team score	Venue	Crowd	Date
Richmond	23.24 (162)	South Melbourne	17.27 (129)	MCG	32,651	24 August 1974
Geelong	15.12 (102)	Hawthorn	9.8 (62)	Kardinia Park	17,844	24 August 1974
Footscray	7.19 (61)	St Kilda	7.15 (57)	Western Oval	17,675	24 August 1974
Fitzroy	14.16 (100)	Melbourne	20.13 (133)	Junction Oval	7,803	24 August 1974
North Melbourne	25.15 (165)	Collingwood	10.14 (74)	Arden Street Oval	25,757	24 August 1974
Carlton	12.11 (83)	Essendon	12.17 (89)	VFL Park	27,321	24 August 1974

=== Round 22 ===
Home team	Home team score	Away team	Away team score	Venue	Crowd	Date
Hawthorn	10.17 (77)	North Melbourne	16.10 (106)	Princes Park	28,110	31 August 1974
Footscray	13.9 (87)	Richmond	11.14 (80)	Western Oval	25,190	31 August 1974
Fitzroy	15.11 (101)	Geelong	17.11 (113)	Junction Oval	8,812	31 August 1974
Essendon	20.17 (137)	Melbourne	15.13 (103)	Windy Hill	13,561	31 August 1974
St Kilda	15.11 (101)	Carlton	19.9 (123)	Moorabbin Oval	16,458	31 August 1974
Collingwood	13.15 (93)	South Melbourne	15.10 (100)	VFL Park	33,786	31 August 1974

== Ladder ==
(P)	Premiers
	Qualified for finals

#	Team	P	W	L	D	PF	PA	%	Pts
1	Richmond (P)	22	17	5	0	2558	1979	129.3	68
2	North Melbourne	22	16	6	0	2398	1728	138.8	64
3	Hawthorn	22	15	7	0	2168	1729	125.4	60
4	Collingwood	22	15	7	0	2131	2037	104.6	60
5	Footscray	22	13	8	1	1899	1746	108.8	54
6	Geelong	22	11	11	0	1858	1989	93.4	44
7	Carlton	22	10	11	1	2053	1941	105.8	42
8	Essendon	22	10	12	0	2110	2162	97.6	40
9	South Melbourne	22	9	12	1	1947	2327	83.7	38
10	St Kilda	22	7	15	0	1790	2018	88.7	28
11	Fitzroy	22	4	17	1	1770	2481	71.3	18
12	Melbourne	22	3	19	0	1840	2385	77.1	12

Rules for classification: 1. premiership points; 2. percentage; 3. points for
Average score: 92.9
Source: AFL Tables

== Finals series ==
=== Finals week 1 ===
Home team	Score	Away team	Score	Venue	Crowd	Date
Collingwood	19.10 (124)	Footscray	6.19 (55)	VFL Park	57,912	7 September
Hawthorn	8.17 (65)	North Melbourne	15.13 (103)	MCG	77,519	7 September

=== Finals week 2 ===
Home team	Score	Away team	Score	Venue	Crowd	Date
Hawthorn	21.12 (138)	Collingwood	13.10 (88)	MCG	84,846	14 September
Richmond	10.13 (73)	North Melbourne	6.16 (52)	VFL Park	57,569	14 September

=== Preliminary final ===
Home team	Score	Away team	Score	Venue	Crowd	Date
Hawthorn	7.9 (51)	North Melbourne	8.8 (56)	MCG	88,262	21 September

=== Grand final ===
Home team	Score	Away team	Score	Venue	Crowd	Date
Richmond	18.20 (128)	North Melbourne	13.9 (87)	MCG	113,839	28 September

== Season notes ==
- North Melbourne became the first team to wear coloured shorts (club colour royal blue) instead of black or white, due to the impending introduction of colour television in Australia. All teams (except Collingwood, Richmond and St Kilda where black was a club colour) followed from the beginning of 1975 after colour television was introduced.
- In the round 7 match between Essendon and Richmond at Windy Hill, Richmond's Mal Brown clashed with Essendon's Graeme Jenkin as the teams moved towards the locker rooms at the half-time siren; after Essendon runner Laurie Ashley went out of his way to confront and abuse Brown, Brown struck Ashley, starting a 15-minute brawl that involved players, team officials, trainers, fans, and police. Richmond's Brian Roberts was left with a broken nose, while Essendon trainer Jim Bradley and a fan were both knocked unconscious and had to be carried from the arena on stretchers. Four players and three officials were charged as a result of the investigation:
  - Laurie Ashley (Essendon runner): suspended for 6 matches after being held to be responsible for starting the brawl.
  - Mal Brown (Richmond player): suspended for one match for striking Laurie Ashley.
  - Jim Bradley (Essendon fitness adviser): suspended for 6 matches for charging and striking Mal Brown.
  - Steve Parsons (Richmond player): suspended for 4 matches for striking Jim Bradley.
  - Ron Andrews (Essendon player): suspended for 6 matches for striking Brian Roberts.
  - Graeme Richmond (Richmond team manager): suspended until 31 December 1974 (17 matches) and fined $2,000 by the VFL Board of Directors for conduct unbecoming or prejudicial to the interests of the League. On 18 September, the VFL demanded that Richmond pay the fine or face indefinite suspension, but the VFL dropped the fine on appeal.
  - John Cassin (Essendon player): cleared after the tribunal found that he was only trying to assist in breaking up the brawl.
  - As a result of a police investigation, assault charges were laid against Steve Parsons and Graeme Richmond; both Parsons and Richmond were cleared of these charges on 11 September.
- In the round 21 match between Richmond and South Melbourne, there was a record 51 aggregate behinds and 91 aggregate scoring shots.
- North Melbourne full-forward Doug Wade kicked his 1,000th career goal in the qualifying final against Hawthorn at the Melbourne Cricket Ground on 7 September.

== Awards ==
- The 1974 VFL seniors Premiership team was Richmond.
- The 1974 VFL reserves Premiership team was Fitzroy.
- The 1974 VFL under 19s Premiership team was Collingwood.
- The VFL's leading goalkicker was Doug Wade of North Melbourne who kicked 103 goals (including 12 goals in the finals).
- The winner of the 1974 Brownlow Medal was Keith Greig of North Melbourne with 27 votes.
  - Many were even more surprised at Greig winning his second Brownlow than they had been at him winning his first (in 1973). In 1973 Barry Davis had won North Melbourne's best and fairest award, and in 1974 John Rantall won North Melbourne's best and fairest award. Greig had not even been the "runner-up" in North Melbourne's best and fairest in either 1973 or 1974.
- Melbourne took the seniors "wooden spoon" in 1974.
- Collingwood 17.14 (116) defeated Essendon 9.14 (68) in the grand final of the under 19s premiership, held at the Melbourne Cricket Ground on 28 September.
- Fitzroy 26.13 (169) defeated Footscray 16.12 (108) in the grand final of the reserves premiership, held at the Melbourne Cricket Ground on 28 September.
- Richmond 18.20 (128) defeated North Melbourne 13.9 (87) in the grand final of the seniors premiership, held at the Melbourne Cricket Ground on 28 September.

== Sources ==
- 1974 VFL season at AFL Tables
- 1974 VFL season at Australian Football
