= Lloyd Hagger =

Australian rules footballer (1898–1968)

Personal information
- Born: 7 December 1898
- Died: 27 June 1968 (aged 69)
- Original team: Barwon
- Height: 183 cm (6 ft 0 in)
- Weight: 72 kg (159 lb)

Playing career^{1}
| Years | Club | Games (Goals) |
| 1917–1929 | Geelong | 174 (389) |

Coaching career
| Years | Club | Games (W–L–D) |
| 1924 | Geelong | 16 (8–8–0) |
- ^{1} Playing statistics correct to the end of 1929.

Career highlights
- 1925 Leading Goalkicker Medalist; Geelong Premiership side 1925; Geelong Captain 1924; Twelve times state representative.

Lloyd Hagger (7 December 1898 – 27 June 1968) was an Australian rules footballer who played with Geelong Football Club in the Victorian Football League (VFL) from 1917 to 1929.

== Football ==
Recruited from Barwon in the Geelong & District Football Association, Hagger played as a key position forward and was known for his high marking and ability to kick goals from difficult angles. Named captain-coach of Geelong in 1924, Hagger was captain for only one season, handing the job over to Cliff Rankin. In 1925 Geelong won the premiership and Hagger was the League's leading goalkicker, with 78 for the season.

He also regularly played for Victoria in interstate matches. At the 1924 Hobart Carnival, Hagger, playing for Victoria against Western Australia, kicked seven goals in Victoria's eight point win. Late in the match Hagger was momentarily knocked out but recovered in time to refuse to leave the ground after a stretcher had been called.

He joined Hampden Football League club Camperdown as captain-coach in 1933.

Hagger had a reputation for being very talkative during gameplay. He also worked as a cartoonist for The Sun News-Pictorial.

== Links ==
- Lloyd Hagger Stats via AFL Tables
