= Bill Eason =

Australian rules footballer and coach

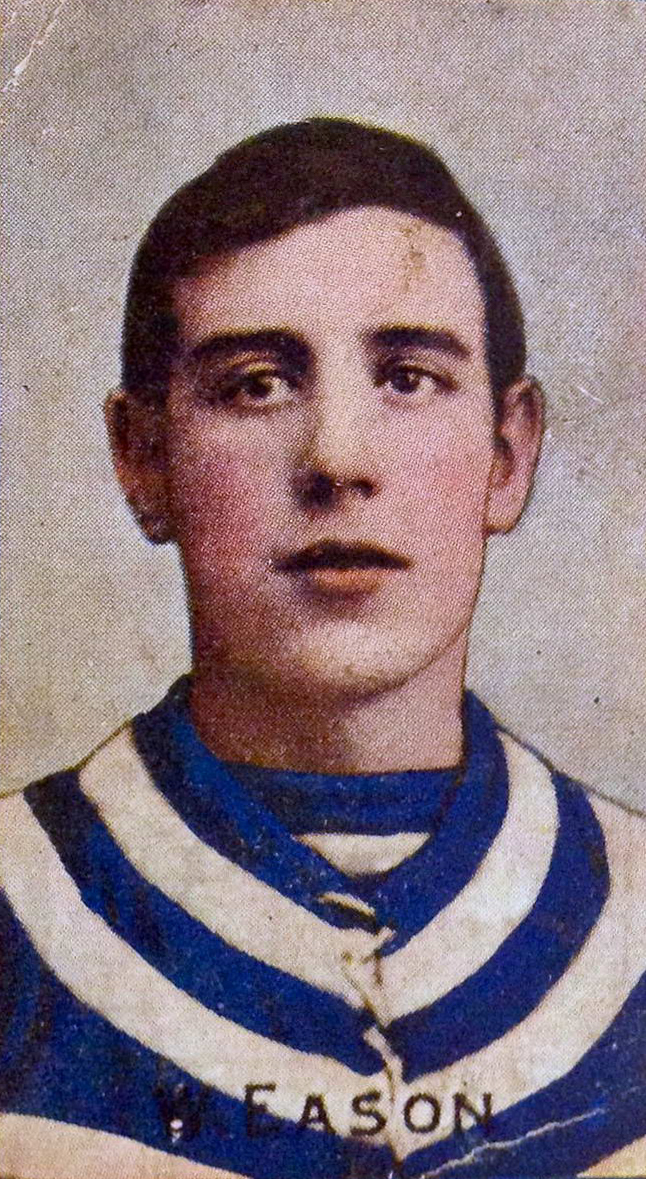
- Cigarette card of Eason in 1908

Personal information
- Full name: William Eason
- Born: 2 February 1882; Liverpool, England
- Died: 6 December 1957 (aged 75); Wendouree, Victoria
- Original team: Barwon
- Debut: Round 1, 1902, Geelong vs. Carlton, at Princes Park
- Height: 178 cm (5 ft 10 in)
- Weight: 79 kg (174 lb)

Playing career^{1}
Years	Club	Games (Goals)
1902–1915	Geelong	220 (187)

Coaching career
Years	Club	Games (W–L–D)
1912–1913	Geelong	37 (21–16–0)
- ^{1} Playing statistics correct to the end of 1915.

William Eason (2 February 1882 – 6 December 1957) was an Australian rules footballer who played for Geelong Football Club. He was the brother of Geelong great Alec Eason.

Eason migrated from Liverpool in England to Geelong in 1883 with his family aboard the steam ship Duke of Buckingham.

A centreman, Eason will forever hold a place in the Geelong record books as being their first footballer to play 200 VFL games. Bill was also an outstanding cricketer in the Geelong Cricket Association taking 547 wickets at 10.7 from 1902 to 1931. He is buried at the East Geelong Cemetery in a family plot that is marked with his younger brother's headstone who died of injuries sustained in a football match at the Corio Oval aged in his early twenties.
