= History of the Geelong Football Club =

Australian football club history

The history of the Geelong Football Club, began in 1859 in the city of Geelong, Australia, is significant as the club is the oldest AFL club, is believed to be the fourth oldest football club in Australia and one of the oldest in the world and one of the most successful. Initially playing under its own rules, some of which, notably, were permanently introduced into Australian Football. It adopted the Laws of Australian Football in the early 1860s after a series of compromises with the Melbourne Football Club.

Geelong went on to play for most of its existence in the premier competitions, the first competition, the Caledonian Society Cup, a foundation club of both the Victorian Football Association (VFA) in 1877 and the Victorian Football League (VFL) in 1897., VFL and continues in the elite Australian Football League (AFL). The Cats have been the VFL/AFL premiers ten times, with four in the AFL era (since 1990). They have also won ten McClelland Trophies, the most of any AFL/VFL club.

With four premierships since the league changed its name to the AFL in 1990, Geelong is the second most successful team since that time.

Many of the club's official records before 1920 have disappeared.

== Origins ==
Records of football matches in Geelong date to 1858. The Geelong Advertiser appears to indicate that Geelong had Saturday football teams regularly "hacked shins" in March 1859. In April 1859 local teetotaler Mr. William "Stitt" Jenkins (of Liverpool, England and Melbourne) who had been working in Geelong from 1853 educating local youths made repeated calls to form an athletic club to play football on Saturday afternoons in April and May of that year. The formation of the Melbourne Football Club in May 1859 appears to have spurred the Pivotonians to incorporate a club of their own.

The Geelong Football Club was formally established at a meeting held in the Victoria Hotel on 18 July 1859.

Historian Graeme Atkinson considers it likely that Geelong's rules were drawn up prior to the establishment of both Geelong and Melbourne Football Club's and that club's rules being drafted on 17 May 1859. Rules allegedly used by the Geelong Football Club in 1859 were originally written down by hand. A reprint of what were believed in 1923 to have been the Geelong's eleven 1859 rules appeared in the Geelong Advertiser courtesy of Fred Blackham from an old folded card. These reprinted rules, which appeared to differ only slightly from Melbourne Football Club's rules, notably do not mention a requirement to bounce the ball which was to feature early in Geelong's rules, however the scrimmage rule showed more influence of rugby football than Melbourne's rules.

Claimed to be Geelong Football Club's official 1859 rules

I. The distance between the Goals and the goal post shall be decided upon by the captains of the sides playing
II. The captains on each side shall toss for choice of goal the side losing the toss has the kick off from the centre point between the goals
III. A goal must be kicked fairly between the posts without touching either of them or any portion of the person of one of the opposite side in case of the ball being forced between the goal posts in a scrimmage a goal shall be awarded
IV. The game shall be played within a space of no more than 200 yards wide the same to be measured equally on each side of a line drawn through the centres of the two goals and two posts to be called the "kick off posts" shall be erected at a distance of 20 yards on each side of the goal posts at both ends and in a straight line with them in case the ball is kicked behind
V. In case the ball is kicked behind Goal any one of the side behind whose Goal it is kicked may bring it 20 yards in front of any portion of the space between the 'kick-off' posts, and shall kick it. as nearly as possible in a line with the opposite Goal
VI. Any player catching the ball directly from the foot may call 'mark'. He then has a free kick: no player from the opposite side being allowed to come inside the spot marked
VII. Tripping, holding and hacking are strictly prohibited. Pushing with the hands or body is allowed when any Player is in rapid motion, or in possession of the Ball, except in the case provided for in rule VI
VIII. The ball may at any time be taken in hand, but not carried further than is necessary for a kick.
IX. When a ball goes out of bounds the same being indicated by a row of posts it shall be brought back to the point where It crossed the boundary line, and thrown in at right angles with that line
X. The ball, while in Play, may under no circumstances be thrown
XI. In ease of deliberate infringement of any of the above Rules by either side the Captain of the opposite side may claim that any one of his party may have a free kick from the place where the breach of Rule was made; the two Captains in all cases, save where Umpires are appointed, to be the sole Judges of infringements

— Geelong Advertiser, 1923.

The club contested its first interclub match against Melbourne at Argyle Square in 1860, which finished as a scoreless draw. The two clubs fostered a strong early rivalry. Mangan (1992) states that Geelong introduced the running bounce due to an ongoing dispute between the two clubs which came to a head during a match in 1862. Melbourne members familiar with the rugby rules were regularly flaunting their own rules of not running with the ball (particularly H. C. A. Harrison but also Tom Wills) carrying it great distances while not being penalised by the umpires. The rules at the time were written in such a way as it could be interpreted by the umpire that the players were allowed sufficient time (to continue to run) for as long as they needed to prepare an effective kick, that is, virtually indefinitely. Geelong officials asserted that the game was "not meant to be played like rugby", began to enforce its rule of bouncing the ball at a certain distance (the exact distance is unknown) while carrying it for matches between the two clubs. This rule was later standardised in Victoria in 1866.

== 1860s: Regular competition ==
In 1863, Geelong travelled to Melbourne to contest the Caledonian Challenge Cup. Although the competition was played under compromised rules, Geelong reached the final and defeated Melbourne to become the second winners of the cup, before defeating two challengers to win the cup permanently in 1864.

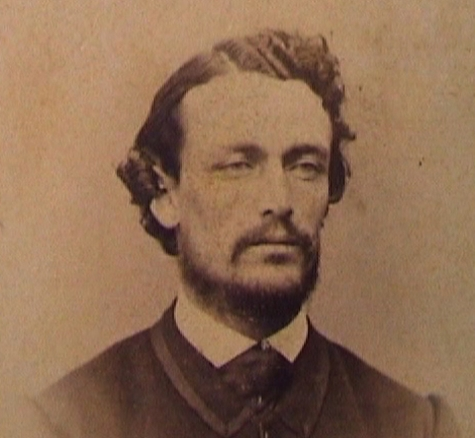
Australian football founder Tom Wills (left) pictured 1863 was a captain-coach and administrator from 1865.

Tom Wills, one of the founders of Australian football, played exclusively for Geelong from 1865 until his retirement from football in 1874. As Geelong's captain, he pioneered the Australian football tactic of flooding.

Geelong played most of its early home games at the Argyle Square, situated between Aberdeen Street and Pakington Street. However, in 1881 the club was evicted from the ground by the private owner who ploughed up the paddock because the club had neglected to pay its rent.

== VFA success (1877–96) ==
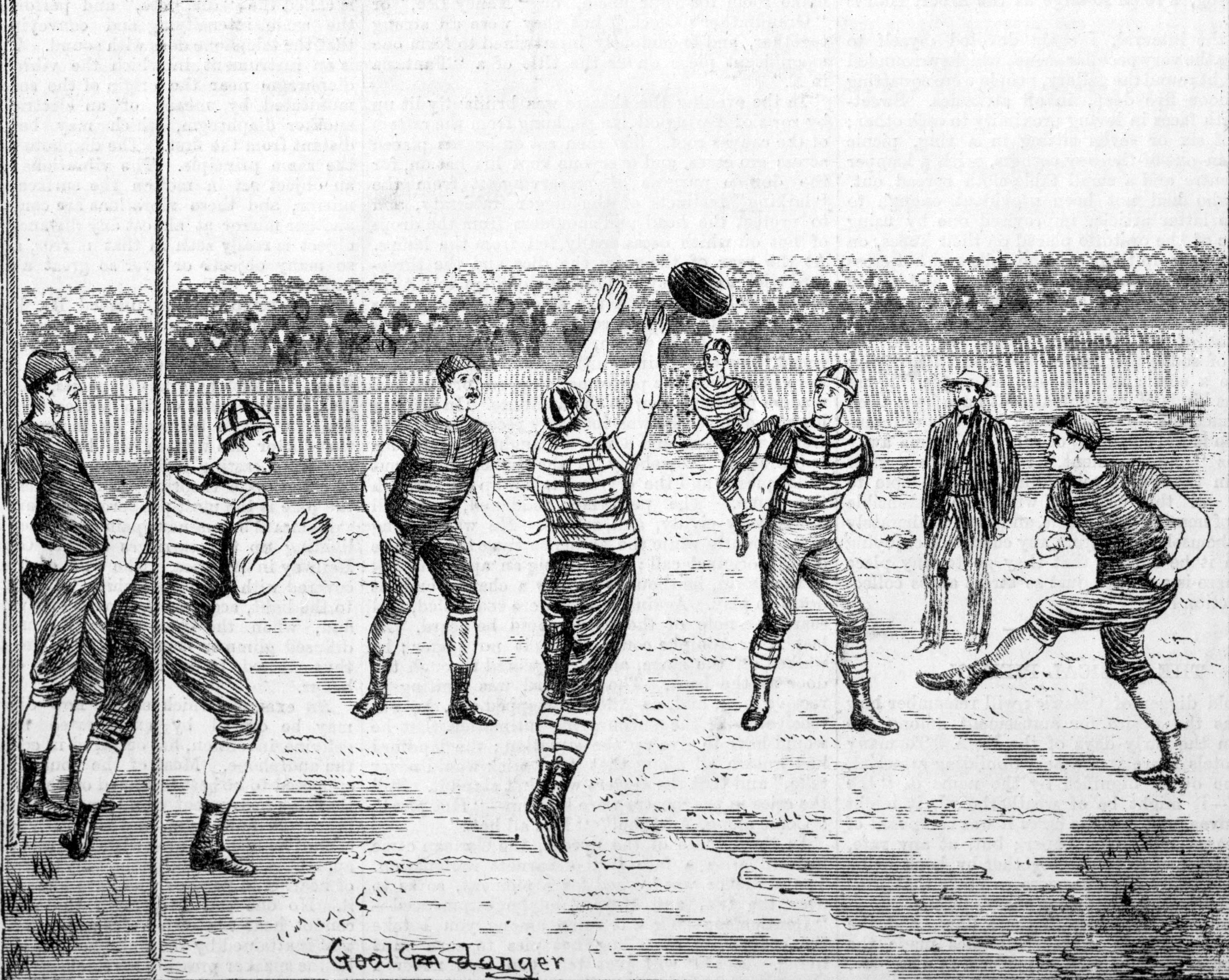
Engraving of Geelong and Melbourne match 1880

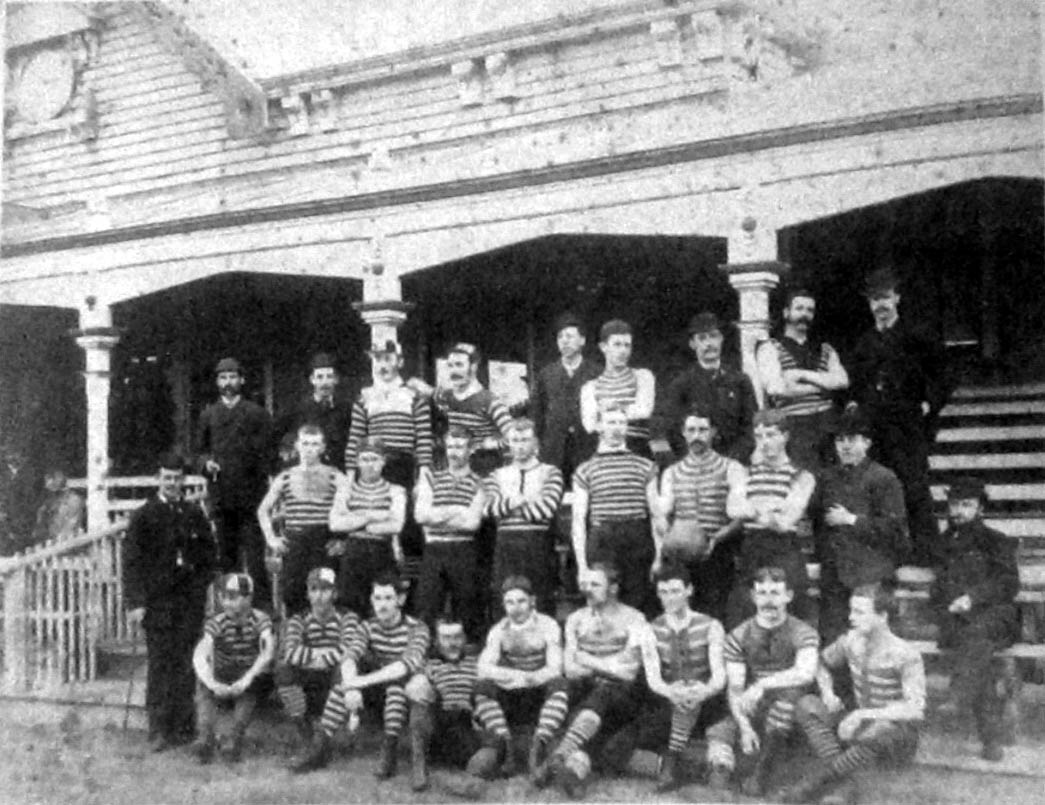
1882 premiership team

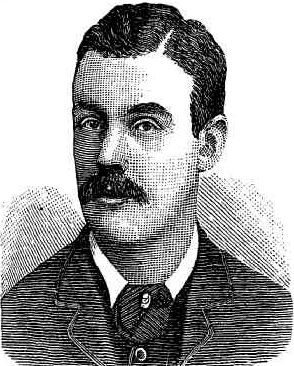
R J Talbot captain of the Geelong Football Club in 1887

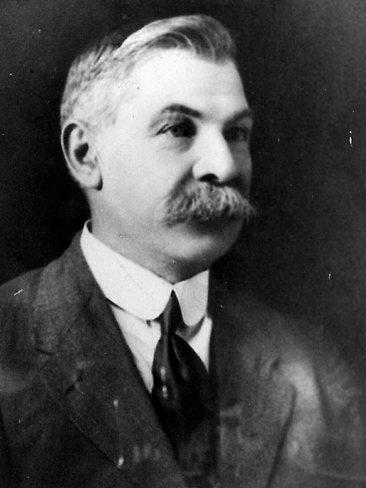
Charles "Chas" Brownlow (right) captained the club in its 1883 premiership season, and was later a club administrator from 1885 to 1923

Following the formation of the Victorian Football Association (VFA) in 1877, Geelong joined the association as one of its foundation clubs. The club relocated to Corio Oval as its main home ground in time for the 1878 season, coinciding with the club's first VFA premiership in the VFA's second season. The club continued to excel over the following twenty years in the VFA, and established itself as one of the dominant clubs in the association by winning a total of seven premierships up to the birth of the (Victorian Football League) (VFL) in 1897.

In 1884, the club merged with the Geelong Cricket Club to form the Geelong Cricket and Football Club. This affiliation would continue until the 1950s.

Geelong was the only non-Melbourne-based team to regularly play matches against metropolitan teams. Notable was Geelong's success in the "Match of the Century" in 1886. This late season match in the VFA between two previously undefeated teams, Geelong and South Melbourne, stimulated unprecedented public interest. It was alleged that saboteurs attempted to destroy one of the special trains carrying Geelong supporters to the match in South Melbourne. Following the victory team was an impromptu public parade in South Melbourne.

== Dawn of the VFL era (1897–1924) ==
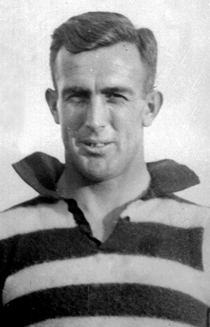
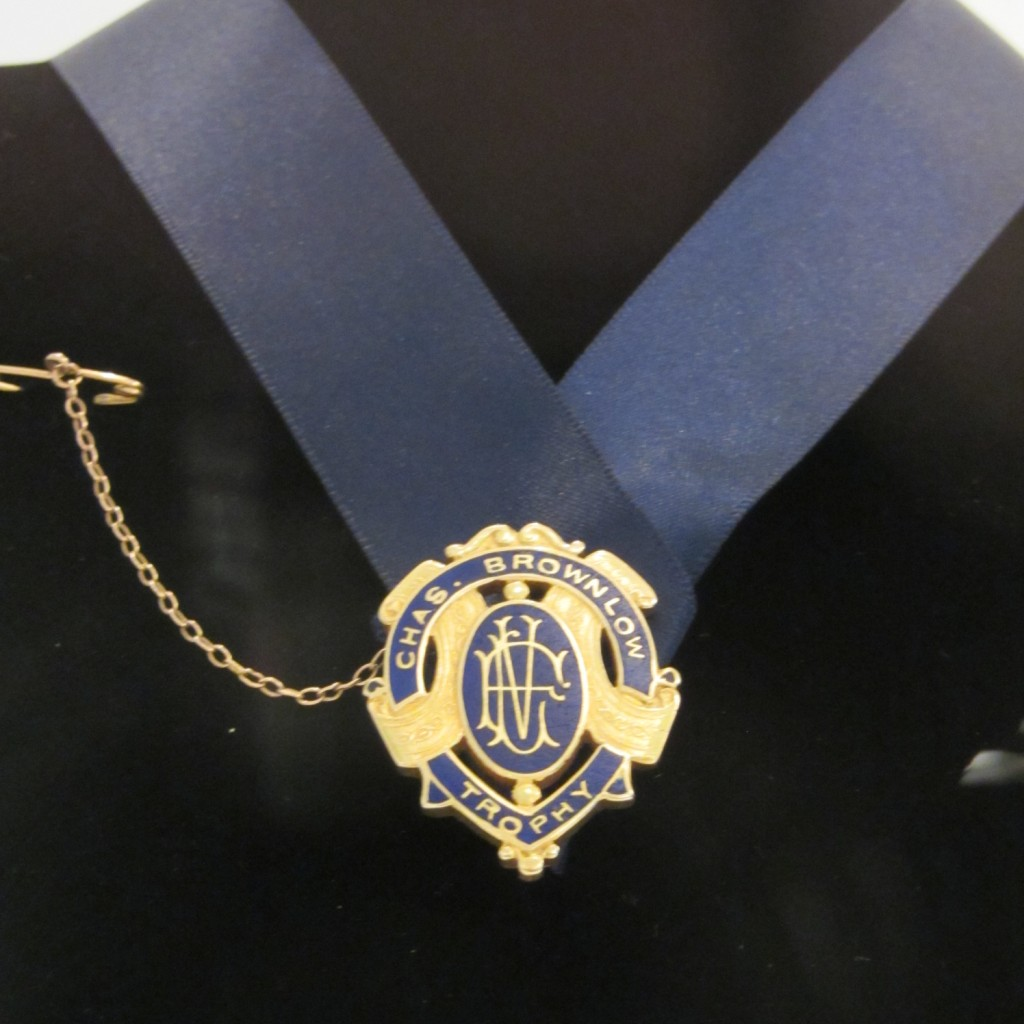
Edward "Carji" Greeves (left), winner of the first Brownlow Medal in 1924 (right)

Geelong helped form the new VFL with other foundation clubs, Carlton, Collingwood, Essendon, Fitzroy, Melbourne, South Melbourne and St Kilda.

For many years the Geelong Football Club were known as the Pivotonians, after the city's nickname 'The Pivot'. Seagulls was also an earlier nickname. The dark blue and white hooped uniform still worn today represents the blue water of Corio Bay and the white seagulls so numerous in the Bay. Geelong was nicknamed the 'Cats' in 1923 after a run of losses prompted a local cartoonist to suggest that the club needed a black cat to bring it good luck.

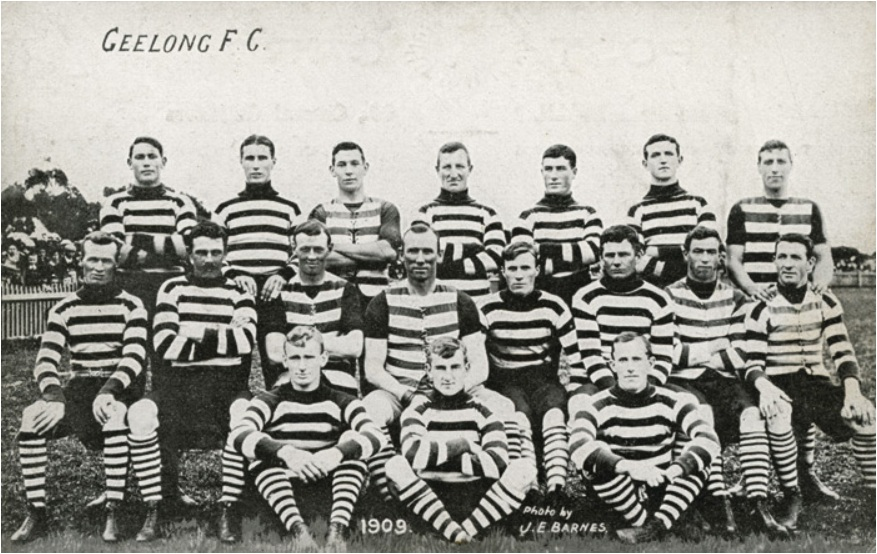
Geelong team of 1909

Despite dominating in the VFA, Geelong found the premiership harder to win in the VFL. Geelong performed poorly early on in the 1923 season. In the lead-up to the club's Round 9 clash against favourites Carlton, the Herald Sun published a depiction of the match by cartoonist Sam Wells, featuring a black cat wandering onto the field to give Geelong good luck. Credit was given to the cat when Geelong recorded an upset win. Geelong captain Bert Rankin liked the analogy and suggested the club adopt "the Cats" nickname, even recruiting key position forward Lloyd Hagger, a talented artist, to design a cat that was made into badges for the players to wear on their lapels. Geelong have been known as the 'Cats' ever since.

In 1924, following the death of VFL and Geelong administrator Charles Brownlow, the league named its award for the best and fairest player in a season the Brownlow Medal. The first player to win the award was Geelong's Edward Greeves. Having been one of the dominant clubs in the old VFA, Geelong struggled to maintain the same level of success during its early years in the VFL.

== Grand Final success (1925–1937) ==
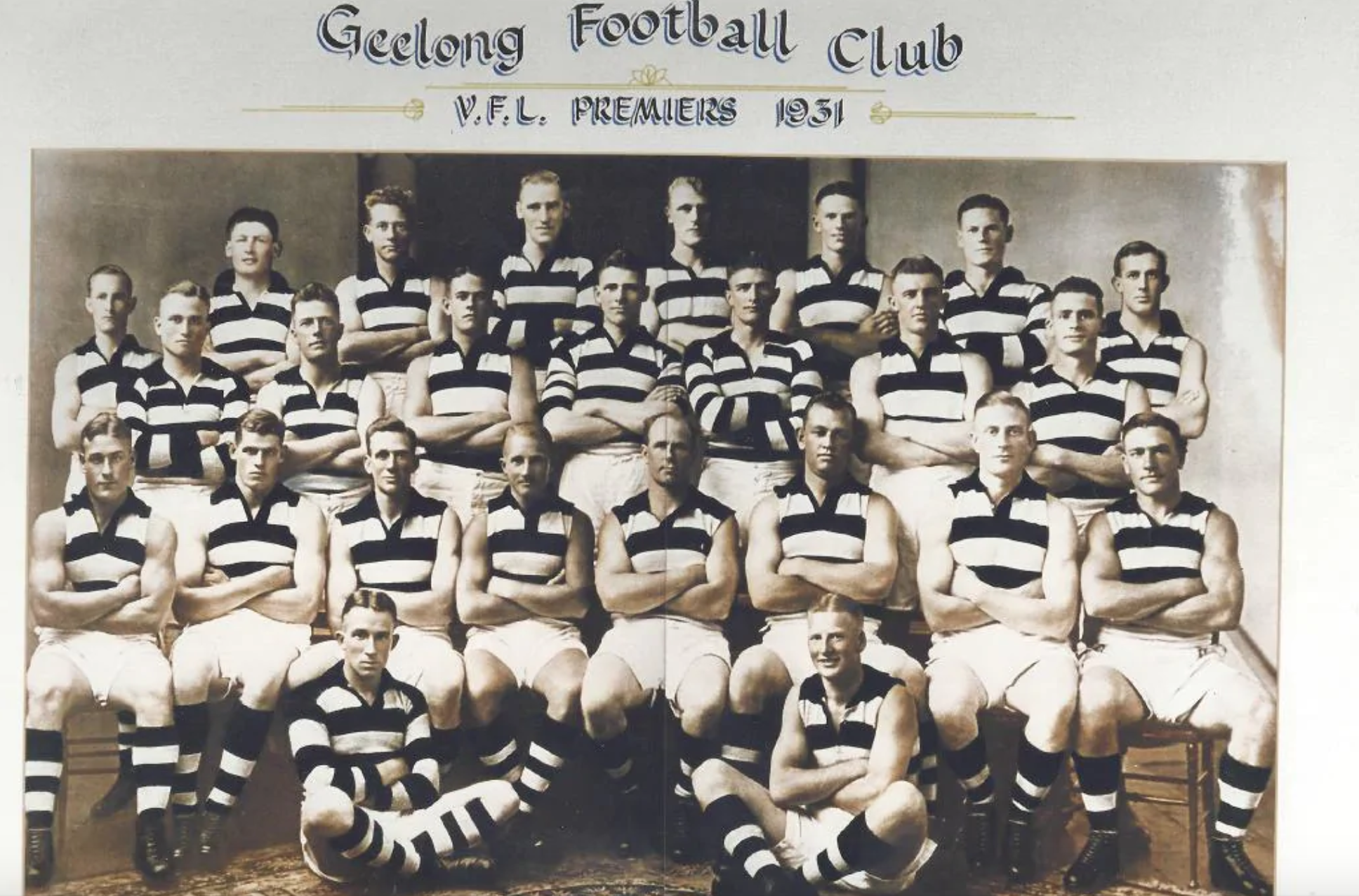
1931 VFL premiership team

It wasn't until 1925 that the club won its first VFL premiership. Geelong followed up with further premiership wins in 1931 and 1937. The 1937 Grand Final is widely regarded as a game of the highest quality, remembered for its long and accurate kicking and high marking. During this era the "Coulter Law" discouraged club administrators from poaching players from each other's clubs. For many footballers who were seldom more than semi-professional sportsmen, match payments supplemented Great Depression-hit wages.

== The impact of World War II (1938–1948) ==
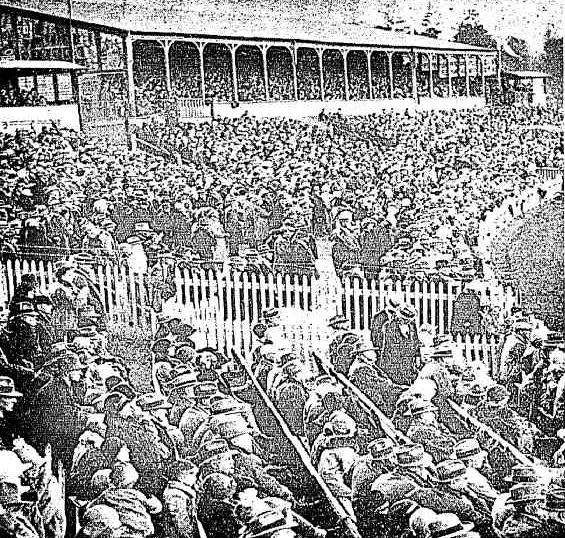
Grandstand and Members Reserve at Corio Oval in 1929

In 1941, the club was forced to relocate from its Corio Oval base due to the oval being required for military training during World War II. During this time, the club decided to set base at the more centrally located Kardinia Park in South Geelong. Geelong experienced a notably lean period during the 1940s, as World War II wartime restrictions prohibited traveling. As a result, players transferred over to other clubs and forced Geelong into recess during 1942 and 1943.

== Return to glory (1949–1959) ==
1951 VFL Grand Final
	G	B	Total
Geelong	11	15	81
Essendon	10	10	70
Venue (attendance)
Melbourne Cricket Ground (84,109)

In 1949, the club's former premiership captain Reg Hickey was appointed as coach for the third time. Despite missing the finals during this first season back with the club, Hickey led Geelong to two consecutive premierships in 1951 and 1952—to date, the only back-to-back premierships in the club's history. Bernie Smith became the club's second Brownlow Medalist in 1951, a year during which the club also signed the Ford Motor Company as a corporate sponsor.

Geelong won the 1951 Premiership under memorable circumstances. Essendon was favoured to win the third of a hat-trick of premierships. However, in the final round of the home and away season Essendon's champion full forward, John Coleman retaliated against Carlton full back, Harry Caspar and was reported and later suspended for four weeks. He therefore was unable to play in the grand final. Bob Davis acknowledges the possibility that had Coleman played, Essendon may well have won, given that Geelong had no true match for him, as Coleman was simply too skilled.

1952 VFL Grand Final
	G	B	Total
Geelong	13	8	86
Collingwood	5	10	40
Venue (attendance)
Melbourne Cricket Ground (82,890)

To celebrate its good fortune, Geelong buried a toy bomber in the Kardinia Park turf. This comical ceremony was inspired by the rumour that Geelong's premiership players of 1937 had buried a magpie in the middle of the ground after their premiership win over Collingwood that year. Players of note in this golden era include Bob Davis, Leo Turner (father of future star, Michael Turner), Peter Pianto, Fred Flanagan, and Bernie Smith. Bernie Smith's quality was recognised with his win in the 1951 Brownlow Medal. In 1952, Geelong easily defeated Lou Richards' Collingwood team. To celebrate the win, the next day the players buried another dead magpie in the middle of Kardinia Park. In 1953, Collingwood defeated Geelong in the Grand Final.

In 1956, Geelong recruited Billy Goggin, Geelong's greatest rover, who also coached Geelong in the 1980s.

Following the conclusion of the 1959 season, Hickey retired as coach and was succeeded by Bob Davis, a dual premiership player from the club's successful 1951 and 1952 period.

== Rebuilding and modest success (1960–1970) ==
Before the 1962 season, Davis helped Geelong recruit ruckman Graham "Polly" Farmer from East Perth to partner Billy Goggin and Alistair Lord in the midfield. Despite Lord winning the Brownlow Medal and full forward Doug Wade winning the Coleman Medal, Farmer missed multiple games through injury and the club were eliminated in the Preliminary Final. However, the club won their sixth premiership of the VFL era the following season in 1963.

1963 VFL Grand Final
	G	B	Total
Geelong	15	19	109
Hawthorn	8	12	60
Venue (attendance)
Melbourne Cricket Ground (101,452)

On 6 July 1963 Geelong was comprehensively and unexpectedly beaten by Fitzroy, 9.13 (67) to 3.13 (31) in the 1963 Miracle Match. In the 1963 season, Geelong played Hawthorn four times. Early in the season the clubs played a draw. However, in the final round of the season, the semi-finals and the grand final (the only instance of a team playing three matches in a row against one other team – Hawthorn does not have that claim as it played Melbourne in the intervening Preliminary Final), Geelong defeated John Kennedy's Hawthorn (the Hawks). Captained by Fred Wooller, Geelong clearly distinguished itself as the team of 1963 with an easy 49 point win. A dead hawk joined two magpies and a toy bomber under the Kardinia Park turf.

Frustratingly for supporters of the Club, 1963 was the last time that Geelong enjoyed premiership success until 2007.

At the beginning of 1964, Geelong recruited John "Sammy" Newman as a ruckman from Geelong Grammar School. In an interview with Lou Richards on Channel 7's World of Sport, Bob Davis predicted that Newman would enjoy a stellar career. Sam Newman played 300 games for Geelong and went on to become a prominent, if controversial, media personality.

Geelong played in finals in every year between 1962 and 1969. Graham Farmer succeeded Fred Wooller as captain in 1965, leading the club until the end of 1967. In 1966, the club board decided to re-open the coaching position for application and eventually settled on Peter Pianto to replace Davis. Pianto led Geelong to the 1967 Grand Final, where they were defeated by Richmond in Farmer's final match for the club.

== Search for a flag (1971–1988) ==
The 1970s were notably unsuccessful for the club, as Geelong won only one final during the entire decade. The club fell behind the progressive clubs of the 1970s, notably Carlton, Richmond, Hawthorn and North Melbourne. Unlike these clubs, Geelong recruited poorly and/or could not afford to recruit quality footballers. During the 1970s footballers increasingly came to view the game as a profession rather than a pastime. Richer and more entrepreneurial clubs outbidded clubs like Geelong for talented and dedicated players. Coaches Graham Farmer and Rodney Olsson failed to develop successful teams. Despite this, club full-forward Larry Donohue became the club's third Coleman Medalist after kicking over 100 goals in 1976.

During 1980, the club brought back Goggin to coach the team. Despite making multiple finals appearances in his first two seasons (including winning the minor premiership in 1980), the club struggled to replicate their home and away season success during the finals. After failing to make the finals in 1982, the club board sacked Goggin as coach and appointed former Richmond premiership coach Tom Hafey in his place. However the club's poor performances on the field continued under Hafey, who failed to lead Geelong to a finals series during his tenure. During his time however, Hafey helped recruit several players to the club, including Gary Ablett, Paul Couch, and Greg Williams. In 1986, the club appointed former premiership player John Devine as coach. Under Devine, the club grew accustomed to the league-wide introduction of the salary cap and AFL draft, recruiting Barry Stoneham, Garry Hocking, Mark Bairstow and Billy Brownless. However, the club failed to make the finals during Devine's tenure and replaced him as coach with Malcolm Blight.

== Decade of disappointment (1989–1999) ==
=== Return to the Grand Final ===
Geelong adapted quickly to Blight's coaching philosophy, and became renowned for kicking high scores. During the 1989 season, Geelong were the only club to win matches by 100 points for three weeks in succession. The club's high scoring game plan led them into their first Grand Final since 1967, however they were defeated by Hawthorn by just six points (in what was regarded as one of the greatest grand finals of all time). Gary Ablett was awarded the Norm Smith Medal after kicking nine goals and one behind, equaling the record set by Collingwood's Gordon Coventry for most goals kicked in a Grand Final. Paul Couch also won the Brownlow Medal to become the club's fourth Brownlow Medalist and first in twenty-seven years.

Geelong failed in 1990 to reproduce the exciting brand of attacking football of 1989. Season 1991 started ominously. On the eve of the season, Gary Ablett retired for odd reasons. Nevertheless, Geelong were winning games. Ablett returned mid-season to the club. The club finished third at the end of the home and away season. The final against 4th placed St Kilda was a memorable one. Tony Lockett kicked his nine goals for St Kilda by three-quarter time. Billy Brownless, kicked eight goals. The Cats won by seven points. Ablett was suspended for elbowing St Kilda's Nathan Burke, and missed the rest of the season due to suspension.

Over the next two weeks, Geelong met Hawthorn and the West Coast Eagles, both losses for the club. Consistent with the close finish of 1989, Hawthorn won the match by two points. The loss against the Eagles was by fifteen points.

In 1992 Geelong returned to the spectacular form of three seasons previous. Against the Brisbane Bears at Carrara the club kicked a VFL/AFL record score of 37 goals 17 behinds (239 points). This record score still stands. Gary Ablett Sr. and Billy Brownless both kicked more than 70 goals for the season to form a potent forward-line combination. Geelong finished the regular season on top of the ladder, eclipsing their previous record for total points scored in a home-and-away season (2916 in 1989) and increased it to 3057 points.

After beating Footscray in the qualifying final by 61 points, Geelong lost the 2nd semi final to the West Coast Eagles by 38 points. The club then bounced back to beat Footscray again in the preliminary final by 64 points to set up another matchup with the West Coast Eagles - this time in the grand final. Geelong got off to a wonderful start, and at one stage during the second quarter were leading by four goals. However, in the second half West Coast's Peter Matera ran riot, booting five goals and earning himself the Norm Smith Medal as best on ground. The Perth-based West Coast won by 28 points to take the first premiership won by a non-Victorian club.

In 1993 the Geelong once again underachieved as Malcolm Blight experimented with more defensive tactics. For most of the season on-field performances were lacklustre as the players struggled to adapt. It was not until late in the season when Geelong reverted to its all-out attacking style of play. Several experienced players urged Blight to revert to Geelong's customary geisha style of play. Blight agreed and Geelong began to play like champions again. Geelong narrowly missed the finals on percentage, despite arguably being the form team at the end of the year. Even more frustratingly, the club finished only one and a half games off top spot on the ladder, but finished seventh in what was a very even year and also the last season that featured a final six.

Also in 1993, Blight decided to play Gary Ablett at Full Forward permanently. The move paid handsome dividends, as Ablett reached the second fastest century in VFL/AFL history. Ablett's most notable performances of this year included 11 goals against Melbourne, 14 against Essendon and 10 against the Adelaide Crows – all in losing sides. Tallies of 10 goal against North Melbourne, and 12 against his favourite victim, Richmond, in winning sides.

1994 proved to be a successful although ultimately hard year for the club. The club had a good home-and-away season to finish fourth. Gary Ablett topped the goalkicking for the year easily, kicking 129 goals (including the finals) and winning his second consecutive John Coleman Medal. The club met fifth placed Footscray in the first week of the finals. The match proved a nailbiter, with an after-the-siren kick and goal by Billy Brownless giving the club a five-point win. A week later it seemed Geelong had no hope of beating Carlton, who had finished 2nd after the home and away season, given that their three best midfielders; Garry Hocking, Paul Couch and Mark Bairstow were not playing through injury. However, with several young players and second-tier midfielders, along with six goals from Gary Ablett, Geelong defeated Carlton by 33 points. Geelong met North Melbourne in the Preliminary Final, with the match proving to be even more nailbiting than their match with Footscray 2 weeks prior. North Melbourne started well, but Geelong dominated the second and third quarters to lead by six goals in the third quarter. A fine feat given that Geelong's target all season, Gary Ablett was being beaten by North Melbourne's full back, Mick Martyn. However, North Melbourne came back strongly in the last quarter and took the lead late in the match. Geelong then scored a behind to level the scores, and with 25 seconds left, a boundary throw-in caused the ball to come to ground as Martyn cleared, only for the ball to be marked by Leigh Colbert. Colbert then kicked long, where ruckman John Barnes dropped the mark, allowing Leigh Tudor, a former North Melbourne player, to swoop and kick the ball over Martyn's head to land in the hand of Gary Ablett. As Ablett walked back to take his kick, the siren went, and Ablett kicked the winning goal, propelling Geelong to its third Grand Final in seven years.

Geelong once again played West Coast for the premiership. Unlike two seasons ago, Geelong proved no match against an Eagles outfit superior to its 1992 premiership team, losing by 80 points. Billy Brownless stood out with a fantastic mark in the second quarter, as well as four goals. Malcolm Blight, dispirited by three Grand Final losses under his tenure, announced his resignation. His assistant Gary Ayres took over the job. Ayres immediately took action, sacking both Steven Hocking (on 199 games) and former captain Mark Bairstow. 1994 saw another best-and-fairest win to Garry Hocking, who also won 20 votes in the Brownlow Medal to finish third to eventual winner Greg Williams on 30 votes and Peter Matera on 28 votes.

1995 saw the club improve. The club was highly consistent, its biggest losing margin being less than 20 points, and never losing two matches in a row. The club finished second on the ladder to Carlton. Gary Ablett once again won the Coleman Medal and kicked over 100 goals for the third year in a row.

In the finals the club met 7th placed Footscray and won by 82 points. The club earned a week break and returned for the third weeks clash against Richmond, and won by 89 points and so for the second consecutive season and for the fourth time in seven years, Geelong played for the premiership, this time against Carlton, who had only lost two games for the year. The match was hard to tip, as many saw Geelong a definite chance given that the two sides met once during the year, which saw Carlton win by three points. Geelong was thrashed by 61 points, playing its worst game for the entire season. Gary Ablett played his worst game for years, he was goalless for the afternoon and was blanketed by Carlton's Stephen Silvagni. Former Geelong player Greg Williams, now a superstar at Carlton, was named best on ground with his five goals. A notable rookie of this year would be Brenton Sanderson, who would play over 200 games by the end of career, retiring at the end of 2005, and be recognised with selection into the Geelong Hall of Fame. The Best and Fairest was won by Paul Couch, who narrowly missed out on winning his second Brownlow Medal.

=== Decline ===
In 1996 the club would experience an unsuccessful year, although still making the finals - finishing seventh at the end of the home and away season. Gary Ablett would be suspended for five weeks after round 2, which resulted in a rapid decline in his quality. He would kick his 1000th career goal against Fremantle. The Cats would meet eventual premier, North Melbourne in the first week of the finals, which saw North win by over 10 goals. Garry Hocking would once again win the Best and Fairest award, and miss out on the Brownlow Medal by a vote in the process. A notable recruit would be Steven King, standing at over two metres tall.

In 1997 Geelong faced a season with no dependence on ageing superstars, Paul Couch and Gary Ablett. By mid season, Couch would retire on 259 games. Gary Ablett would not play a senior game again for the club after injuring his knee in the reserves. The club would start the season well, making the pre season competition grand final (for the first time since 1989) against Carlton. Unfortunately, identically to 1995, Geelong capitulated in the final, allowing Carlton another piece of silverware. The club then went on to the regular season and produced a solid year with 15 home and away wins, equal top with St. Kilda (although second on the ladder with a slightly lower percentage). The club met North Melbourne in a home final at the MCG at night. North Melbourne beat Geelong by 18 points in a hard fought encounter. Geelong then travelled to Adelaide to play the Crows and lost the match by eight points. The resultant loss caused the Cats to exit by losing both finals.

1998 was a season best forgotten. The club finished 12th, its lowest finish for over 40 years and its equally lowest ever. A notable recruit for Geelong came in the form of Matthew Scarlett, son of former player, John. Geelong took full advantage of the father–son rule. This concession allowed sons of ex-players to nominate for their fathers' clubs, thus exempting them from being chosen by any other club in the national draft.

In 1999 the club won five games straight to open the season. However, the club then lost its next 9 to finish the season with 10 wins and tenth position. The roller-coaster season saw coach Gary Ayres quit to take the job at Adelaide, which ironically was available after Malcolm Blight quit, almost identical to when Ayres took over Geelong in 1995. Mark Thompson was appointed coach. At the end of this season, Geelong traded Leigh Colbert for North Melbourne premiership player, Cameron Mooney.

== New direction (2000–present) ==
=== Thompson's rebuild ===
Thompson's first season as senior coach in 2000 was somewhat successful; Geelong finished the regular season in fifth position and qualified for the finals series for the first time since 1997, losing to Hawthorn in an elimination final. It was the first AFL finals match played at the new Docklands Stadium. Following the dissolution of the AFL reserves competition in 1999, Geelong began fielding a reserves team in the Victorian Football League (VFL)^{[a]} from 2000.

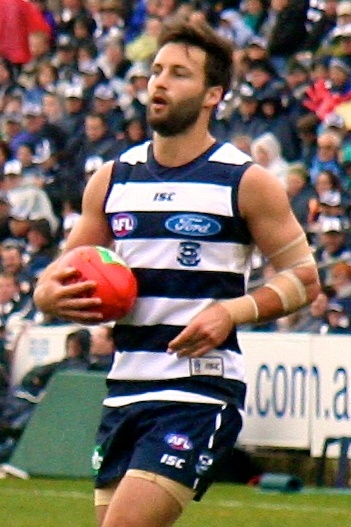
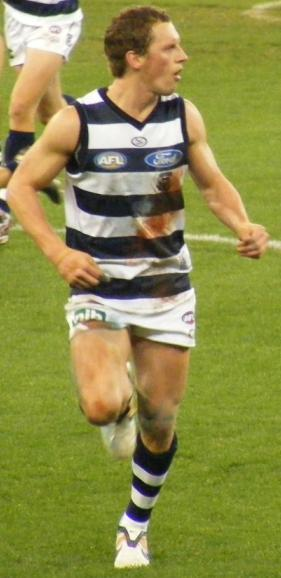
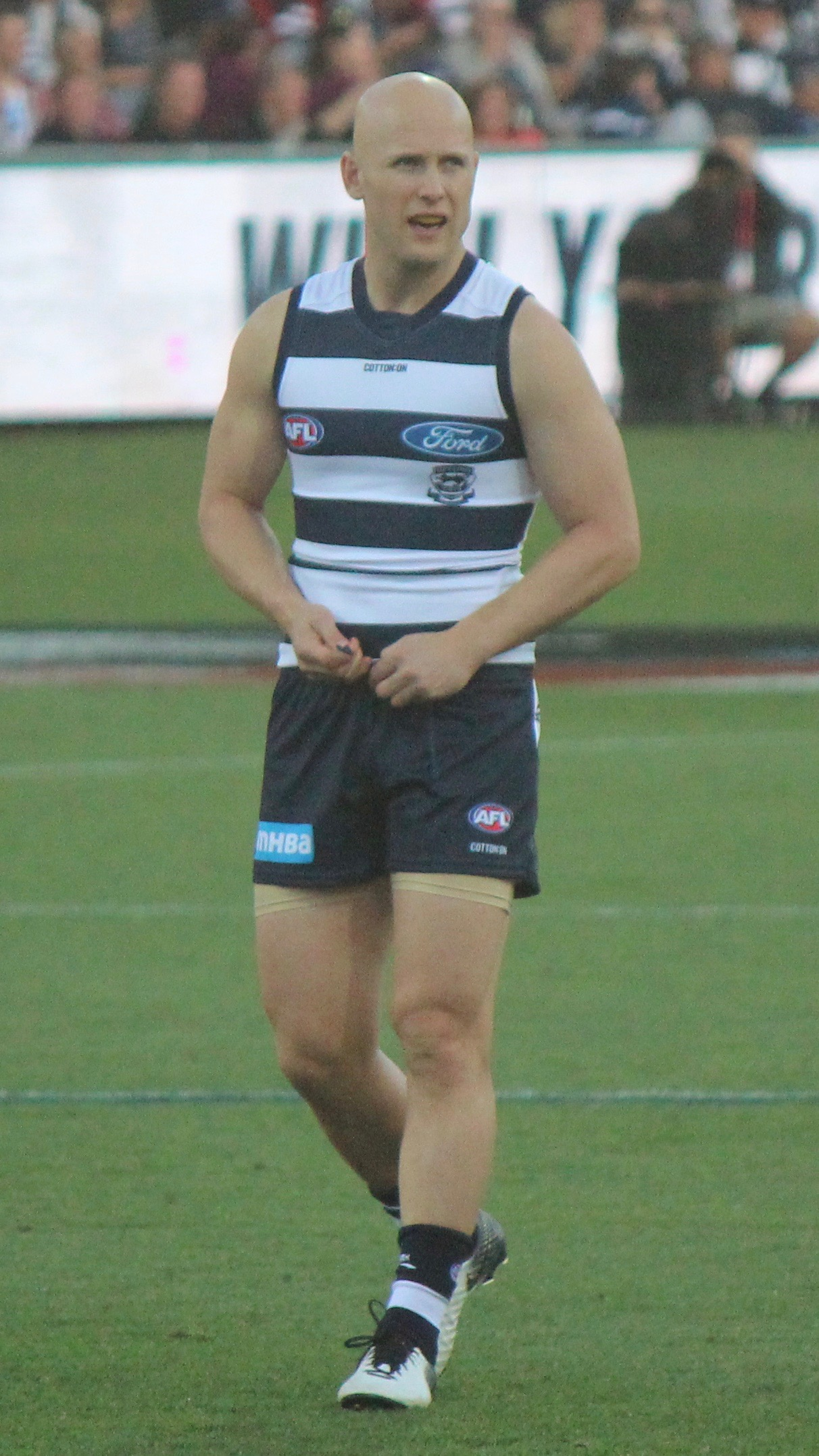
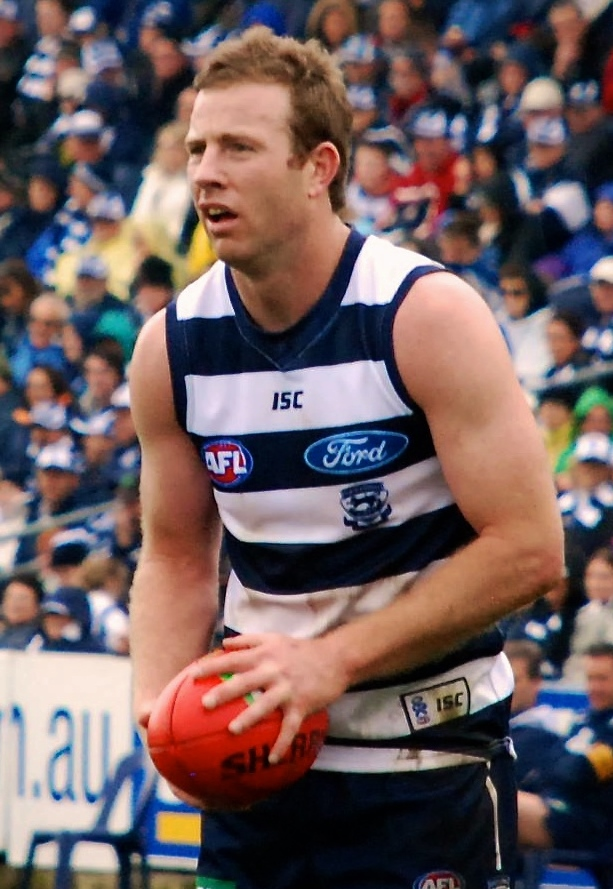
Jimmy Bartel, James Kelly, Steve Johnson and Gary Ablett Jr. were all recruited by Geelong in the 2001 AFL draft.

Across the next three seasons Geelong experienced a lean period where finals were not realised for three years from 2001 to 2003 – finishing twelfth, ninth and twelfth respectively. The club did, however, recruit well during this period. Particularly notable was the 2001 AFL draft, where future premiership players Jimmy Bartel, James Kelly, Steve Johnson and Gary Ablett Jr. (under the father–son rule) were all selected by Geelong. In the absence of finals appearances at AFL-level, the club's reserves team won its first VFL premiership in 2002.

Geelong returned to the finals in 2004, progressing through to the preliminary finals where they lost to Brisbane by nine points. Post season, Geelong signed Nathan Ablett under the father–son rule, just as the club had done with older brother Gary in 2001. Geelong also recruited Brad Ottens from Richmond during the 2004 trade period; this trade would later prove significant with Ottens playing a key role in the club's coming premiership success. A notable departure from Geelong was Ben Graham, the club captain from 2000 to 2002, who quit playing Australian rules football to pursue a career as a punter with the New York Jets in the National Football League.

The club once again played in the finals in 2005, defeating Melbourne in an elimination final by 55 points to reach the semi-finals, where they played Sydney at the Sydney Cricket Ground. Although Geelong were leading by as much as 23 points in the final quarter, Sydney's Nick Davis scored the final four goals of the game (including a goal just before the final siren) to give Sydney a three-point victory. Sydney would subsequently win the 2005 AFL Grand Final.

After winning the 2006 pre-season competition, Geelong opened the regular season with two wins before losing seven of its next eight games. Ultimately, the club finished tenth on the ladder and failed to make the finals. Responding to member anger, the Board ordered a comprehensive review of all aspects of the administration of the club and of the club's personnel. Coach Mark Thompson was widely perceived to be at risk. However, the review accepted that Thompson should continue as coach. The Board opted for stability over the uncertainty of radical personnel change. Thompson was publicly outraged by the ordeal which he considered poorly handled.

=== Premiership drought ends ===
It appeared Geelong would repeat the outcome of the previous season after five rounds of the 2007 season, where Geelong was positioned tenth on the ladder with two wins and three losses, with the latest loss being against the Kangaroos at Skilled Stadium. Following this unexpected loss at their home ground, player Paul Chapman publicly criticised the club's culture, expressing frustration at the lack of team mentality present with many of the players, and urging the club as a whole to change this underachieving culture for the better. Chapman's criticisms, which followed a similar assessment from coach Mark Thompson, led to a group discussion involving all of the club's playing and coaching staff, and produced frank assessments of both individuals and the club in general. This session proved to be a catalyst for the club to begin a transformation of the club's culture, and resulted in a 157-point defeat of Richmond, with Geelong's score of 222 points the club's third-highest overall. This was the beginning of a winning-streak where the club won 15 games in succession before losing to the second-placed Port Adelaide in round 21. Geelong then succeeded in winning their remaining match of the regular season, where they finished three games clear of Port Adelaide in first position on the ladder, earning the club their first McLelland Trophy since 1992, and qualification for the season's finals series.

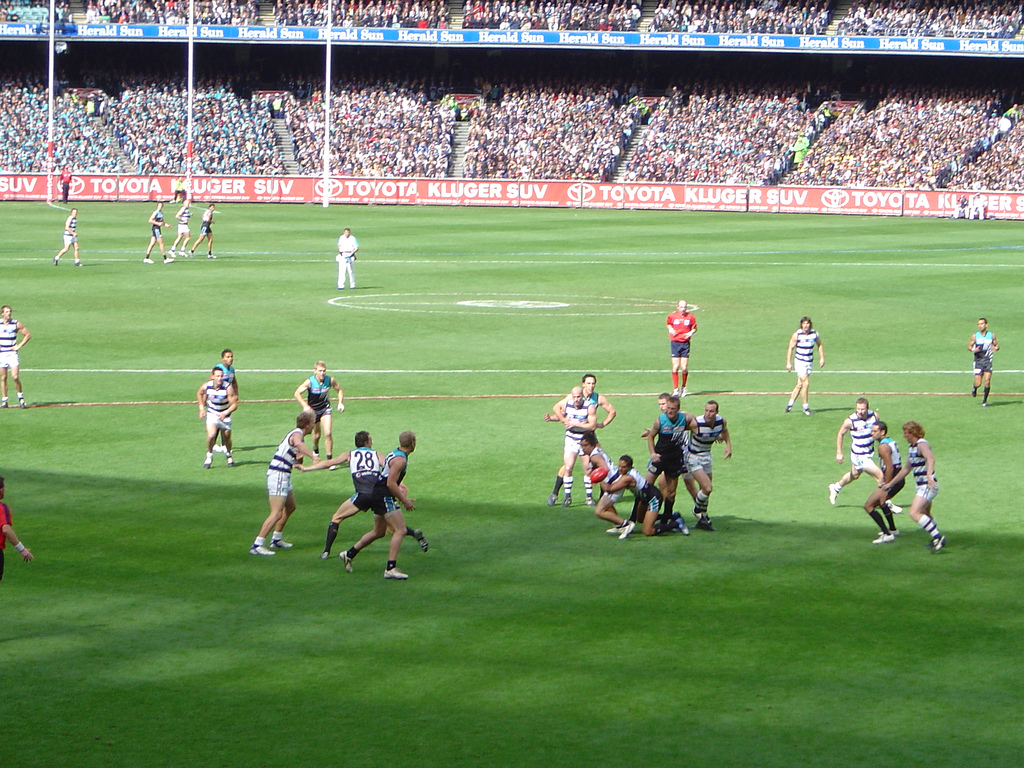
Geelong ending its 44-year premiership drought by beating Port Adelaide in the 2007 Grand Final

Geelong proceeded to defeat the Kangaroos and Collingwood in their qualifying and preliminary finals respectively, the latter being a close game with Collingwood threatening victory late in the match. Geelong ultimately won the match by five points.

2007 AFL Grand Final
	G	B	Total
Geelong	24	19	163
Port Adelaide	6	8	44
Venue (attendance)
Melbourne Cricket Ground (97,302)

These two victories ensured Geelong a place in the 2007 AFL Grand Final against Port Adelaide, which Geelong won by a record margin of 119 points. Geelong scored 24 goals and 19 points for a total of 163 points (the highest score by any grand finalist since Essendon in 1985 with 170), compared to the six goals and eight points scored by Port Adelaide for a total of 44 points (the lowest score by any grand finalist since Essendon in 1990). Steve Johnson was awarded the Norm Smith Medal after being judged the best player in the match, providing Geelong with just their second Norm Smith Medallist. Cameron Mooney scored the highest number of goals with five, and a total of 11 Geelong players scored at least one goal, with five of those players scoring two goals or more. The win was Geelong's first premiership since 1963, and broke the club's 44-season premiership drought. The club had also won the 2007 VFL premiership against Coburg the weekend before.

Geelong changed their name to the Geelong Cats in 2008 and continued to dominate with the club having a regular season record of 21 wins and one loss to become the best-performing team in the home-and-away season since Essendon in 2000. The club's sole loss occurred in Round 9 with an 86-point deficit against Collingwood. Geelong finished the regular season in first position on the ladder, earning the club a second-consecutive McClelland Trophy, its ninth overall. Geelong then proceeded to win its qualifying and preliminary finals in succession, earning a place in the 2008 AFL Grand Final against Hawthorn and the chance for a second-consecutive premiership. However, Geelong failed to capitalise on its performance during the season, losing the grand final by a margin of 26 points.

2009 AFL Grand Final
	G	B	Total
St Kilda	9	14	68
Geelong	12	8	80
Venue (attendance)
Melbourne Cricket Ground (99,251)

Geelong's season began strongly in 2009, with the club winning the 2009 NAB Cup and managing a successive run of victories for the opening 13 rounds of the season. The winning streak was broken when Geelong was defeated by St Kilda in Round 14 by six points. Geelong managed to defeat the reigning premiers, Hawthorn, in the two clubs' second meeting of the season in Round 17. The match was notable with Geelong successfully completing a comeback from a 28-point deficit early in the final quarter to record a victory when an after-the-siren kick Jimmy Bartel scored a point and resulted in a win. Despite not placing first on the ladder at any point during the regular season, Geelong managed a regular-season record of 18 wins and four losses, which was the first time a team had won 18 or more matches in the VFL or AFL's regular season for three consecutive seasons. After qualifying for the 2009 AFL finals series, Geelong proceeded to win its qualifying and preliminary finals in succession, earning a place in the 2009 AFL Grand Final against St Kilda. Geelong were victorious, defeating St Kilda by 12 points.

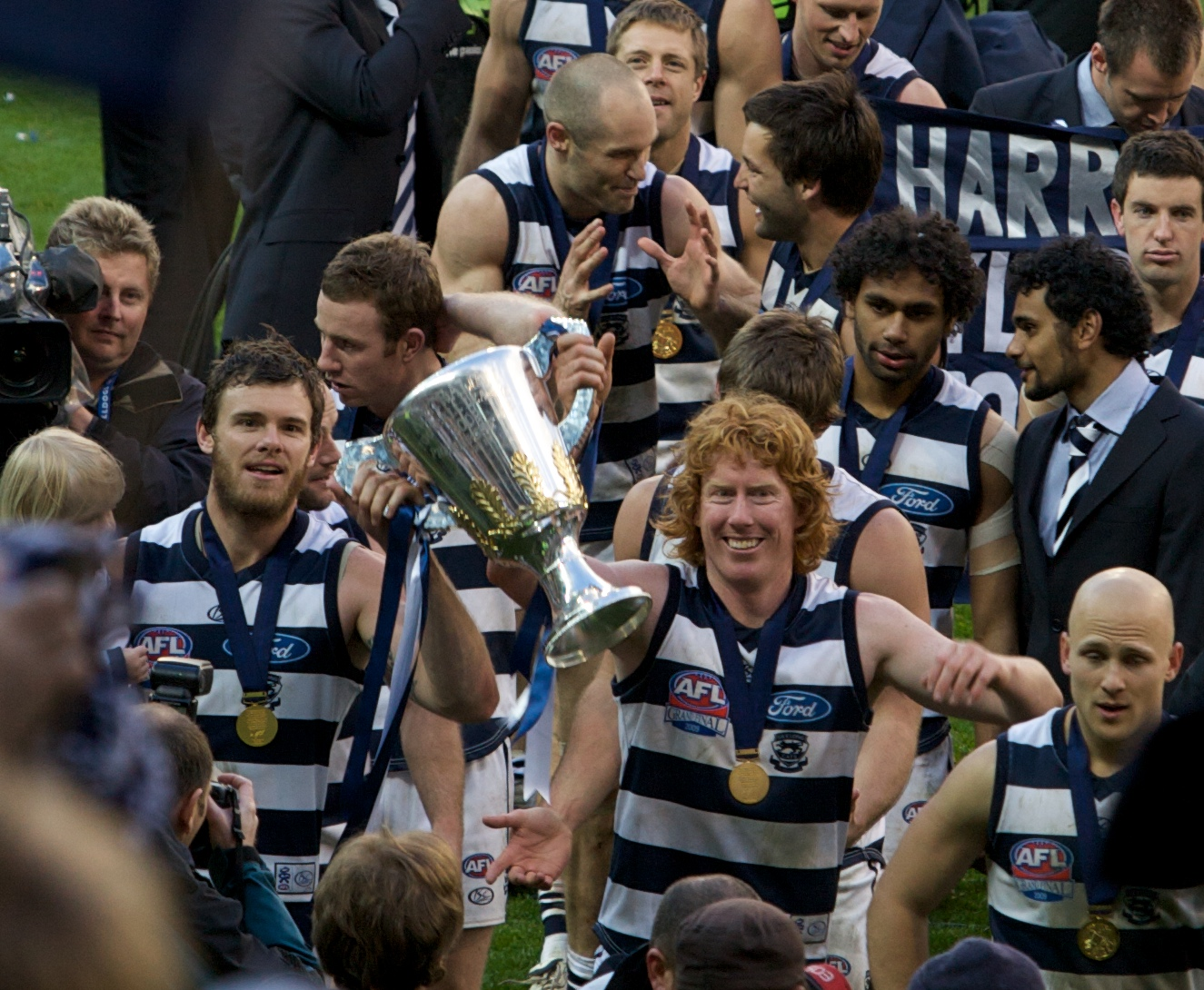
Cameron Mooney and Cameron Ling holding the 2009 premiership cup

This victory marked the first time since 1984 that a grand final had been won by a team which had been trailing at all breaks. The Norm Smith Medal was awarded to Paul Chapman, after gathering 26 possessions and scoring three goals, including the goal which effectively won the match for Geelong.

In addition to the premierships and Norm Smith Medallists, this era of success for the Geelong Football Club was capped by supplying Brownlow Medallists (Bartel and Gary Ablett, Jr. in 2007 and 2009 respectively). Between 2007 and 2009, Geelong players received 13 individual selections in All-Australian teams over the three seasons, including a record nine selections in the 2007 team. Other individual successes include Ablett winning the Leigh Matthews Trophy as the AFL Players Association (AFLPA) Most Valuable Player on a record three occasions and for a record three consecutive seasons from 2007 to 2009.

In 2010, Geelong finished second on the ladder but did not reach the grand final. After much speculation throughout the season, it was confirmed at season's end that Gary Ablett Jr. would be joining the Gold Coast expansion club that was entering the league in the 2011 season. As a marquee player, Ablett signed a five-year contract worth an estimated $1.6 million (AUD) a season, which was significantly more than Geelong could afford to offer. Less than a week later, Mark Thompson resigned from his position as senior coach, despite being contracted until the end of 2011. Although he cited burnout from coaching as the primary reason for his departure, Thompson joined Essendon one month later as a senior assistant coach to James Hird.

Through the 2007–2010 period of success under Thompson, Geelong perfected a style of high-possession and, in particular, high-handpassing football. Using the skill of its star midfielders, Geelong often executed long running chains of handpasses to break through the defensive zones which top clubs like Sydney and Adelaide had used to great effect in 2005–2006. The club set new records for most disposals every year through this period, with record low kick-to-handpass ratios – including having fewer kicks than handpasses across its entire 2009 premiership season. Its success with the tactic was revolutionary: as recently as 2003, having fewer kicks than handpasses was universally seen as a sign of a struggling team; but Geelong's teams were able to turn it into an attacking weapon and become the highest scoring team in the league. It was not until teams began adopting full field defensive presses, pioneered by St Kilda in 2009, that Geelong's dominance was matched.

=== Scott takes over ===
2011 AFL Grand Final
	G	B	Total
Collingwood	12	9	81
Geelong	18	11	119
Venue (attendance)
Melbourne Cricket Ground (99,537)

Following Thompson's departure, former Brisbane player Chris Scott was appointed as senior coach of the club. Despite an ageing playing list and predictions that the team would struggle in 2011, Geelong finished the regular season in second position on the ladder, with only three losses for the season. The team then won its first two matches of the finals series to qualify for the 2011 AFL Grand Final against reigning premier Collingwood, where Geelong proceeded to win the match by 38 points to claim its third premiership in the space of five seasons, and the club's ninth VFL/AFL premiership overall. Jimmy Bartel, who played in each of these three premiership wins, was awarded the Norm Smith Medal for his best on ground performance. Notably, all three of Collingwood's losses for the season were to Geelong. Premiership captain Cameron Ling announced his retirement from the AFL at the conclusion of the season, and Joel Selwood was appointed to the position in January 2012.

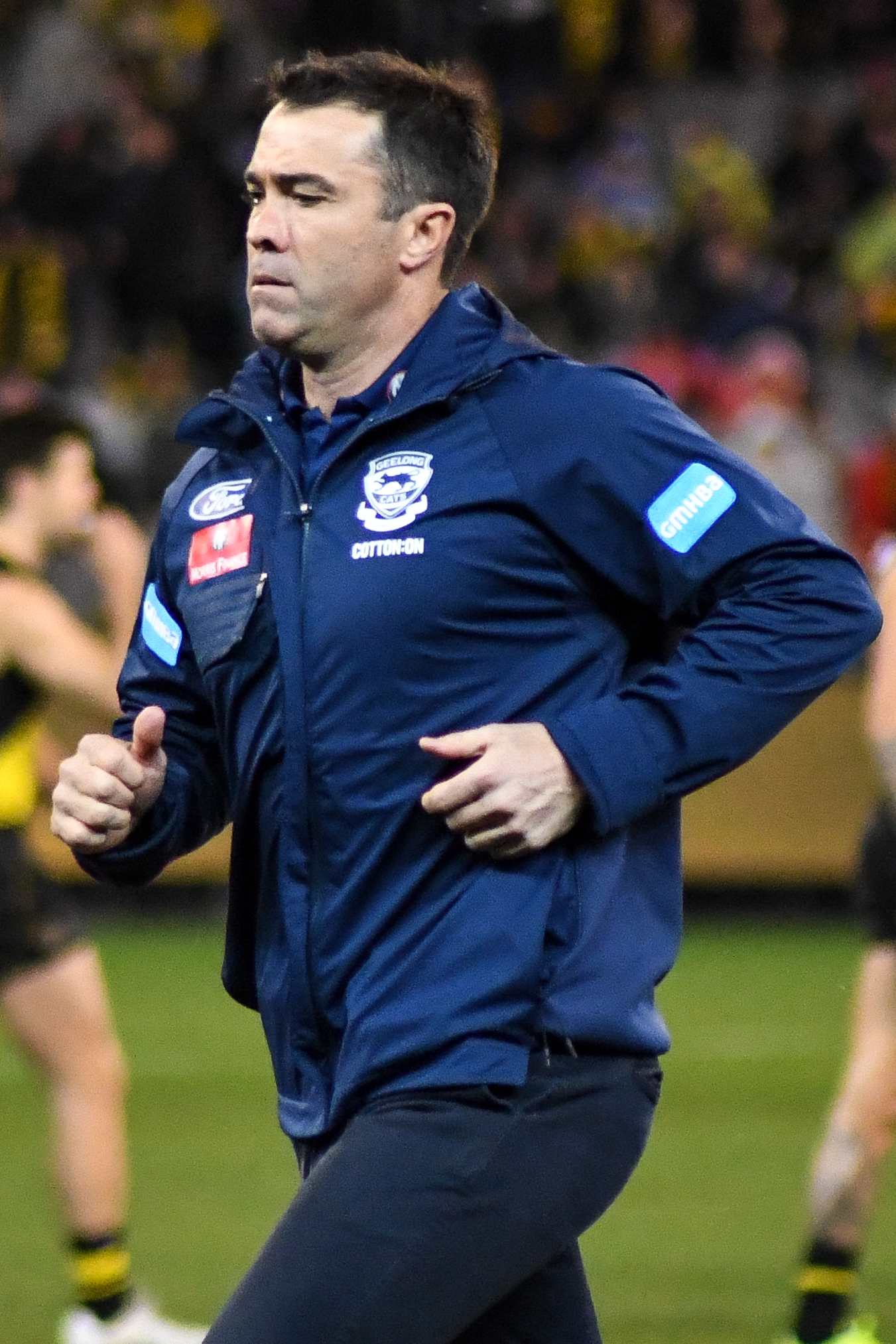
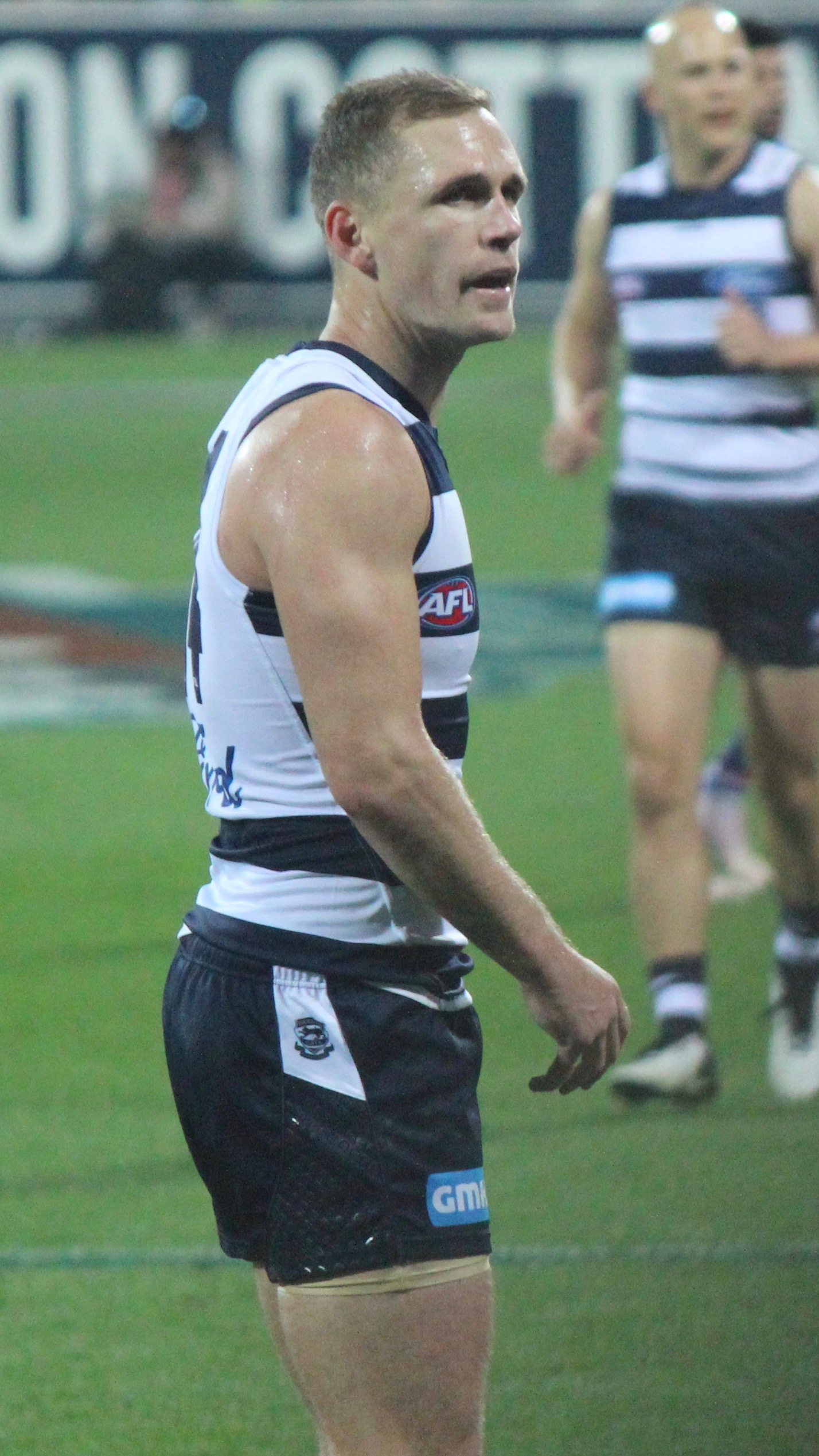
Current senior coach Chris Scott and captain Joel Selwood

Geelong were unsuccessful in defending their premiership in 2012, finishing the regular season in sixth position and subsequently losing its elimination final against Fremantle at the Melbourne Cricket Ground. It was the first time Fremantle had won a final outside its home state in its 18-year existence. This unexpected loss resulted in some commentators stating that it was the end of Geelong's era of recent success. In the reserves however, Geelong won its third VFL premiership, defeating Port Melbourne by 33 points in the 2012 VFL Grand Final.

Geelong again participated in the finals series across the next two seasons, reaching the preliminary finals in 2013 and the semi-finals in 2014. Notably, Geelong's qualifying final against Fremantle in 2013 was the first time Kardinia Park hosted a finals match, with Geelong losing the game by 15 points.

During 2015, the round fourteen match between Adelaide and Geelong was cancelled, and declared a draw, following the death of Adelaide coach Phil Walsh. It was the first time a match had been abandoned in VFL/AFL history.

=== Recruiting for success and entry of women's team ===
After finishing tenth on the ladder in 2015, Geelong failed to qualify for the finals series; it was the first time the club had not played in the finals since the 2006 season. As a result, Geelong were highly active in the offseason's free agency and trade period, opting to recruit established AFL players Patrick Dangerfield (from Adelaide), Lachie Henderson (Carlton), Scott Selwood (West Coast) and Zac Smith (Gold Coast) in a bid to return to premiership contention in 2016. Dangerfield's recruitment, in particular, had been the subject of much media speculation throughout the season, as it was confirmed that he wished to return to his home state of Victoria. Consequently, Dangerfield was traded to Geelong after winning Adelaide's best and fairest award for 2015.

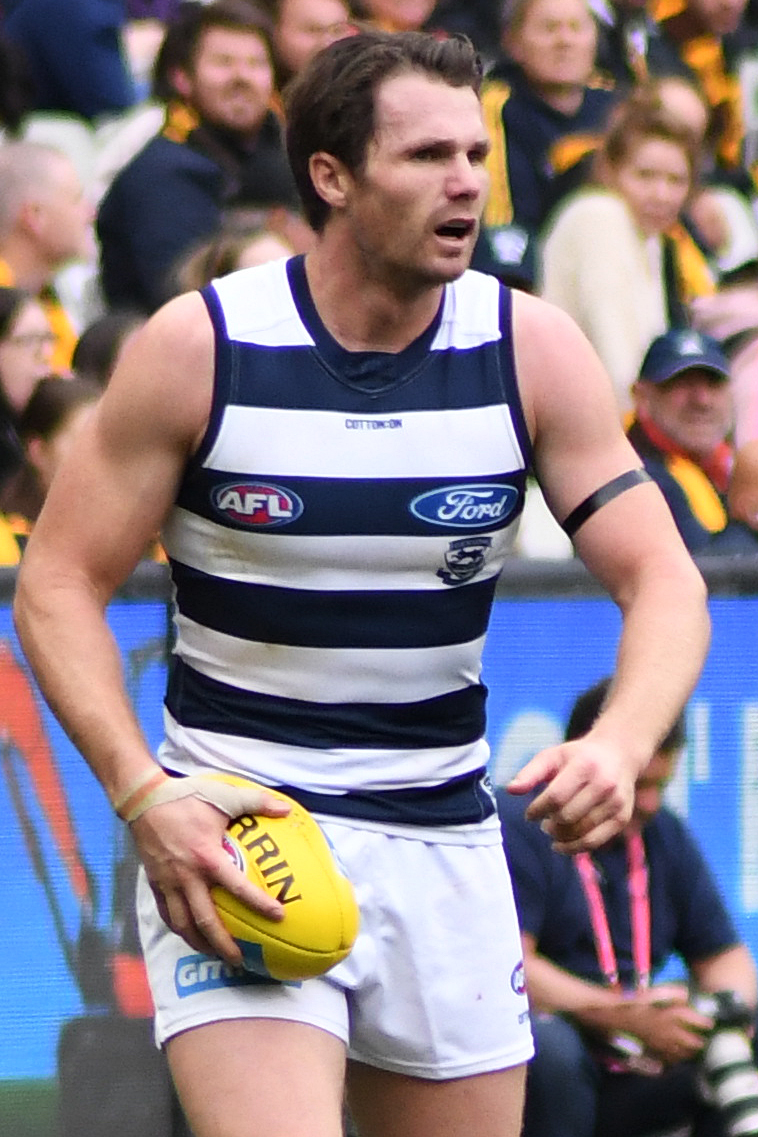
Patrick Dangerfield won a Brownlow Medal in first season at Geelong in 2016.

The club's recruitment strategy was in response to the departure of many of its premiership players in the preceding seasons, such as Brad Ottens (in 2011), Matthew Scarlett and David Wojcinski (2012), and Joel Corey (2013). In addition to retirements across this period, some veteran players were not offered new contracts and were either traded or released via free agency to new clubs; this included Paul Chapman, James Kelly and Mathew Stokes all moving to Essendon, James Podsiadly joining Adelaide, as well as Josh Hunt and Steve Johnson both playing for Greater Western Sydney.

Geelong improved remarkably from the prior year in 2016, finishing the regular season in second position and progressing to the preliminary finals, where the team lost to Sydney by 37 points. During the season, Corey Enright achieved the club's all-time games record with his tally of 326 games in round nineteen; Jimmy Bartel also celebrated his 300th game milestone in the same round. Dangerfield, in his first season at the club, polled a then-record 35 votes to win the 2016 Brownlow Medal.

The 2017 season resulted in Geelong once again reaching the preliminary finals, before succumbing to Adelaide by 61 points. In the subsequent offseason, Gary Ablett Jr. was traded back to Geelong after seven seasons with Gold Coast. The club placed eighth on the league's ladder in 2018, but did not progress past the first finals week after being defeated in an elimination final against Melbourne by 29 points.

The 2019 season saw Geelong finish on top of the AFL ladder for the first time since 2008. The Cats were excellent in the first half of the season, winning 11 of their first 12 matches. However, their form dropped off after the round 13 bye and they would not win consecutive matches for the remainder of the year. After losing the first qualifying final to Collingwood by 10 points, they bounced back to eliminate reigning premiers West Coast by 20 points in the first semi-final. They reached the preliminary final stage for the fourth time in seven years but would again fall at the penultimate hurdle, losing to eventual premiers Richmond by 19 points.

The Cats finished fourth on the ladder at the end of the COVID effected 2020 regular season and, despite losing to Port Adelaide by 16 points in the qualifying final, they would finally end their losing run in preliminary finals and book their first grand final place in nine years after defeating Collingwood and Brisbane by 68 and 40 points in the semi-final and prelim respectively. However, the Cats would not add to their trophy cabinet after losing to Richmond by 31 points in the decider, despite leading by 15 points at half time. This match ended up being a sad farewell to Gary Ablett Jnr, who was playing his last game after hurting his twice previously-injured shoulder in the opening minutes of the match. He played on, although he was clearly dealing with pain all night, and left the field beside a guard of honour from both sides while carrying son Levi.

Geelong finished third on the ladder in 2021 and made it through to yet another preliminary final, having overcome a poor 43-point loss to Port Adelaide in the qualifying final to defeat Greater Western Sydney by 35 points the following week. However, the Cats’ hopes of avenging their grand final defeat were dashed in uncompromising fashion, suffering an 83-point belting at the hands of Melbourne in the preliminary final.

After being overlooked to join the inaugural AFL Women's (AFLW) competition in 2017, the club has been granted a licence to enter a standalone team in the league from the 2019 season. Geelong has also participated in the VFL Women's competition since 2017.

=== 10th premiership and 2020s ===
2022 AFL Grand Final
	G	B	Total
Geelong	20	13	133
Sydney	8	4	52
Venue (attendance)
Melbourne Cricket Ground (100,024)

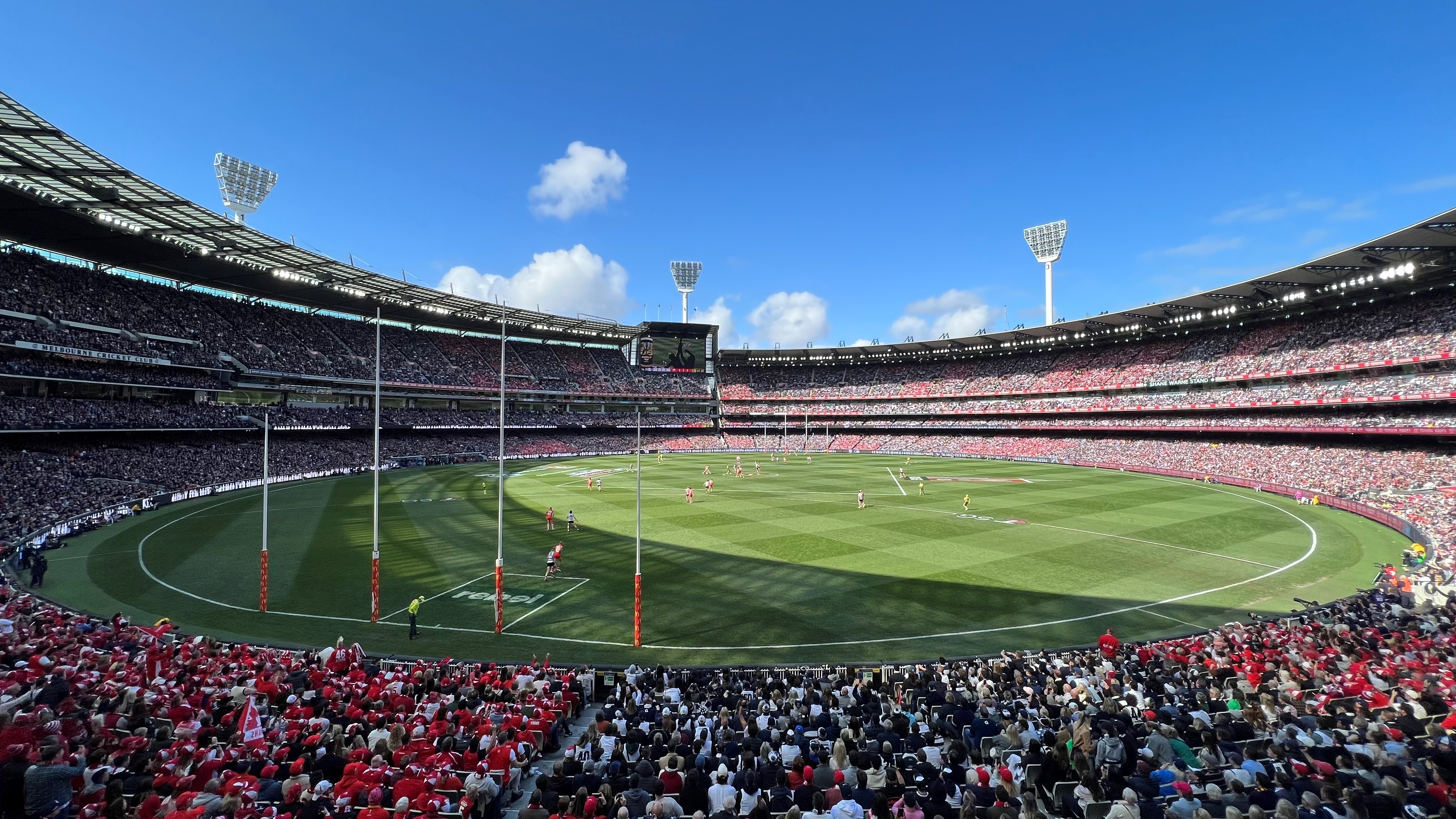
2022 AFL Grand Final

Geelong had a shaky start to their 2022 campaign, beginning the year with five wins and four losses. However, the Cats would not lose another game for the entire season, including a 6-point qualifying win over Collingwood, a 71-point preliminary final domination of the Brisbane Lions and a grand final triumph over Sydney to notch the Cats' 10th premiership and Chris Scott's 2nd. Geelong jumped the Swans early on, clinching a 6.5 (41) to 1.0 (6) quarter time lead which enabled them to cruise to an 81-point victory. Isaac Smith won the Norm Smith Medal.

Geelong’s premiership defence got off to a bad start, losing the first three games of their 2023 campaign. The Cats improved enough to be well in contention for finals until late in the year, ultimately fading out to finish 12th and miss the finals for only the second time in Chris Scott's 13-season coaching tenure. The Cats became the second reigning premier in three years (after Richmond in 2021) to not make the final eight.

Geelong’s absence from September was short-lived, as the Cats returned to premiership contention in 2024. They finished third on the AFL ladder with a 15–8 win-loss record, and defeated second-ranked Port Adelaide by 84 points in the second qualifying final. The Cats met Brisbane in a preliminary final once again, but this time fell short, losing to the Lions by 10 points.

Geelong returned to the grand final in 2025, but suffered a 47-point defeat to the Lions, who achieved back-to-back premierships.

In August 2026, it was first publicly revealed that Geelong defender Jake Kolodjashnij had signed a waiver in 2024, absolving the club from liability in the event of future concussions. Kolodjashnij had suffered several concussions over the prior few seasons, and he had been cleared as medically fit to play by the AFL's independent medical panel; and he and the club came to the waiver agreement while negotiating his two-year contract extension covering the 2025–2026 period. Following its review, the AFL fined Geelong $100,000 – as well as triggering the payment of an existing unrelated $40,000 suspended fine – for entering into an unauthorised variation to a player's contract and failing to lodge the document with the league and the AFLPA. Kolodjashnij did not play another match (neither senior nor reserves) after the waiver became public knowledge, and he was medically retired at the end of the season. In the aftermath of the controversy caused by the waiver, Geelong continued to perform well on-field, finishing fifth on the ladder with a 15–8 record. Geelong defeated Carlton by 33 points in the elimination final before ultimately falling to a 14-point defeat against Fremantle in the semi-final.

== See also ==
- List of Geelong Football Club seasons
- 1963 Miracle Match

== Notes ==
- ^{a} The current Victorian Football League (VFL) was renamed from the former Victorian Football Association (VFA) in 1996. It is a separate competition from the Australian Football League (AFL), which was known as the Victorian Football League from 1897 to 1989.

== Bibliography ==
- Lovett, Michael, ed. (2010). AFL Record Season Guide 2010. G. Slattery. p. 521. ISBN 978-0-9806274-5-9.
