= Carji Greeves Medal =

Australian rules football award

- Awarded for: The best and fairest player each season playing for the Geelong Football Club
- Location: Crown Palladium Ballroom
- Country: Australia
- Presented by: Geelong Football Club
- Currently held by: Bailey Smith
- Website: Carji Greeves Medal

The Carji Greeves Medal is a name given in recent decades to an Australian rules football award given to the player(s) adjudged best and fairest for the Geelong Football Club for the season.

The voting system has changed a number of times. For the 2017 AFL season, the voting panel consisted of the senior coach, director of coaching and the assistant coaches rating each player out of 15 after every game. The combined votes are averaged to give a final score for that game. To ensure players are not disadvantaged by injury, only a player's highest-scoring 21 games counted.

For the 2022 AFL season, after each game, the senior and assistant coaches reviewed and rated each players performance out of 10. Votes were polled in games where a players performance had been deemed of a high quality by the coaching group, and unlike previous seasons all matches counted towards their final total.

Edward 'Carji' Greeves was a champion Geelong footballer who won the inaugural Brownlow Medal in 1924, awarded to person deemed the best and fairest player in the Victorian Football League.

== Recipients ==
^	Denotes current player
+	Player won Brownlow Medal in same season

Table of recipients, with runner ups and votes
Season	Recipient	Votes	Runner up	Votes	Ref.
1897	Joe McShane	—	—	—	
1898	—	—	—	—	
1899	—	—	—	—	
1900	—	—	—	—	
1901	—	—	—	—	
1902	—	—	—	—	
1903	Teddy Rankin	—	—	—	
1904	—	—	—	—	
1905	Henry Young	—	—	—	
1906	Henry Young (2)	—	—	—	
1907	—	—	—	—	
1908	—	—	—	—	
1909	—	—	—	—	
1910	Dick Grigg	—	—	—	
1911	Dick Grigg (2)	—	—	—	
1912	Dick Grigg (3)	—	—	—	
1913	—	—	—	—	
1914	Dick Grigg (4)	—	—	—	
1915	Alec Eason	—	—	—	
1916	None^{[a]}				
1917	Bert Rankin	—	—	—	
1918	—	—	—	—	
1919	—	—	—	—	
1920	Jockie Jones	—	—	—	
1921	Billy McCarter	—	—	—	
1922	Keith Johns	—	—	—	
1923	Billy McCarter (2)	—	—	—	
1924	—	—	—	—	
1925	—	—	—	—	
1926	—	—	—	—	
1927	George Todd	—	—	—	
1928	Reg Hickey	—	—	—	
1929	Jack Williams	—	—	—	
1930	George Todd (2)	—	—	—	
1931	George Todd (3)	—	—	—	
1932	George Moloney	—	—	—	
1933^{[b]}	Les Hardiman	—	Jack J. Walker	—	
1934	Reg Hickey (2)	—	—	—	
1935	Fred Hawking	—	Reg Hickey	—	
1936	Tom Quinn	—	Reg Hickey	—	
1937	Tom Quinn (2)	—	Les Hardiman	—	
1938	Tom Arklay	—	—	—	
1939	Jack Grant	—	Angie Muller	—	
1939	Leo Dean	—	Angie Muller	—	
1940	Tom Arklay (2)	—	Jack Butcher	—	
1941	Jim Knight	—	—	—	
1942	None^{[c]}				
1943	None^{[c]}				
1944	Jim Munday	—	—	—	
1945	Jim Fitzgerald	—	Ralph Patman	—	
1946	Geoff Mahon	—	Fred Flanagan	—	
1947	Lindsay White	—	Don Bauer	—	
1948	Bruce Morrison	—	Bernie Smith	—	
1949	Fred Flanagan	—	Bernie Smith	—	
1950	John Hyde	—	Bruce Morrison	—	
1951	Bernie Smith+	—	Neil Trezise	—	
1952	Geoff Williams	—	Peter Pianto	—	
1953	Peter Pianto	—	John Hyde	—	
1954	Norm Sharp	—	Peter Pianto	—	
1955	Geoff Williams (2)	—	John O'Neill	—	
1956	Bernie Smith (2)	—	Peter Pianto	—	
1957	Bob Davis	—	Peter Pianto	—	
1958	John O'Neill	—	—	—	
1959	Colin Rice	—	—	—	
1960	Fred Wooller	—	—	—	
1961	Roy West	—	Bill Goggin	—	
1962	Alistair Lord+	—	Bill Goggin	—	
1963	Graham Farmer	—	Peter Walker	—	
1964	Graham Farmer (2)	—	Bill Goggin	—	
1965	Peter Walker	—	—	—	
1966	Denis Marshall	—	Graham Farmer	—	
1967	Bill Goggin	—	Graham Farmer	—	
1968	John Newman	—	Bill Goggin	—	
1968	John Newman	—	Denis Marshall	—	
1969	Doug Wade	—	—	—	
1970	Bill Goggin (2)	—	—	—	
1971	David Clarke	—	Bill Goggin	—	
1972	Ian Nankervis	—	—	—	
1973	Bruce Nankervis	—	—	—	
1974	Bruce Nankervis (2)	—	John Newman	—	
1975	John Newman (2)	—	—	—	
1976	Ian Nankervis (2)	—	—	—	
1977	Ian Nankervis (3)	—	—	—	
1978	David Clarke (2)	—	—	—	
1979	David Clarke (3)	—	Ian Nankervis	—	
1980	Rod Blake	—	Michael Turner	—	
1981	Peter Featherby	—	Ian Nankervis	—	
1982	John Mossop	—	Michael Turner	—	
1983	Ray Card	—	—	—	
1984	Gary Ablett Sr.	—	—	—	
1985	Greg Williams	—	Gary Ablett Sr.	—	
1986	Paul Couch	—	—	—	
1987	Mark Bos	—	—	—	
1988	Mark Bos (2)	—	—	—	
1989	Paul Couch+ (2)	—	Barry Stoneham	—	
1990	Barry Stoneham	—	Garry Hocking	—	
1991	Garry Hocking	—	—	—	
1992	Ken Hinkley	—	Tim McGrath	—	
1993	Garry Hocking (2)	—	Gary Ablett Sr.	—	
1994	Garry Hocking (3)	—	Gary Ablett Sr.	—	
1995	Paul Couch (3)	—	Gary Ablett Sr.	—	
1996	Garry Hocking (4)	149	Brad Sholl	118	
1997	Liam Pickering	145	Glenn Kilpatrick	137	
1998	Peter Riccardi	—	Garry Hocking	—	
1999	Ben Graham	118	Peter Riccardi	112	
2000	Steven King	—	—	—	
2001	Brenton Sanderson	443	Matthew Scarlett	427	
2002	Steven King (2)	527	Cameron Ling	472	
2003	Matthew Scarlett	560	Cameron Ling	431	
2004	Cameron Ling	597	Matthew Scarlett	549	
2005	Joel Corey	509	Matthew Scarlett	465	
2006	Paul Chapman	462	Jimmy Bartel	383	
2007	Gary Ablett Jr.	691	Jimmy Bartel	513	
2008	Joel Corey (2)	591	Gary Ablett Jr.	538	
2009	Gary Ablett Jr.+ (2)	740	Jimmy Bartel	629	
2009	Corey Enright	740	Jimmy Bartel	629	
2010	Joel Selwood	667	Gary Ablett Jr.	647	
2011	Corey Enright (2)	150	Joel Corey	143	
2012	Tom Hawkins	1394	Joel Selwood	1388	
2013	Joel Selwood (2)	323	Harry Taylor	311	
2014	Joel Selwood (3)	304	Tom Hawkins	294	
2015	Mark Blicavs^	177	Steven Motlop	167	
2016	Patrick Dangerfield+^	253	Joel Selwood	238	
2017	Patrick Dangerfield^ (2)	240	Mitch Duncan	225.5	
2018	Mark Blicavs^ (2)	234	Patrick Dangerfield^	233.5	
2018	Mark Blicavs^ (2)	234	Tim Kelly	233.5	
2019	Patrick Dangerfield^ (3)	268	Tim Kelly	259.5	
2020	Cameron Guthrie	228	Tom Hawkins	224	
2021	Tom Stewart^	214	Jack Henry^	212	
2022	Jeremy Cameron^	113	Mark Blicavs^	104	
2022	Cameron Guthrie (2)	113	Mark Blicavs^	104	
2023	Tom Stewart^ (2)	135	Tom Atkins^	105	
2024	Max Holmes^	164	Zach Guthrie^	120	
2025	Max Holmes^ (2)	175	Bailey Smith^	155	
2026	Bailey Smith^	178	Max Holmes^	151	

== Multiple winners ==
^	Denotes current player

Player	Medals	Seasons
Dick Grigg	4	1910, 1911, 1912, 1914
Garry Hocking	4	1991, 1993, 1994, 1996
David Clarke	3	1971, 1978, 1979
Paul Couch	3	1986, 1989, 1995
Patrick Dangerfield^	3	2016, 2017, 2019
Ian Nankervis	3	1972, 1976, 1977
Joel Selwood	3	2010, 2013, 2014
George Todd	3	1927, 1930, 1931
Gary Ablett, Jr.	2	2007, 2009
Tom Arklay	2	1938, 1940
Mark Bos	2	1987, 1988
Mark Blicavs^	2	2015, 2018
Joel Corey	2	2005, 2008
Corey Enright	2	2009, 2011
Graham Farmer	2	1963, 1964
Bill Goggin	2	1967, 1970
Cameron Guthrie^	2	2020, 2022
Reg Hickey	2	1928, 1934
Max Holmes^	2	2024, 2025
Steven King	2	2000, 2002
Billy McCarter	2	1921, 1923
Bruce Nankervis	2	1973, 1974
John Newman	2	1968, 1975
Tom Quinn	2	1936, 1937
Bernie Smith	2	1951, 1956
Tom Stewart^	2	2021, 2023
Geoff Williams	2	1952, 1955
Henry Young	2	1905, 1906

== Notes ==
- ^{a} The Geelong Football Club did not participate in the 1916 VFL season because of World War I.
- ^{b} The award was known at the time as the Theo Lewis Cup.
- ^{c} The Geelong Football Club did not participate in the 1942 and 1943 VFL seasons because of World War II.
