= John O'Neill =

John O'Neill may refer to:

== Music ==
- John O'Neill (guitarist) (born 1957), Northern Irish guitarist of rock band The Undertones
- John O'Neill (musician, born 1926) (1926–1999), British singer, whistler, and trumpeter

== Politics ==
- John O'Neill (Canadian politician) (1858–1922), Liberal politician in Ontario, Canada
- John O'Neill (congressman) (1822–1905), U.S. Representative from Ohio and state senator
- John O'Neill (Fenian) (1834–1878), member of the Irish Republican Brotherhood (Fenians)
- John O'Neill (Irish senator) (died 1941), Irish Cumann na nGaedheal senator in 1925
- John O'Neill (philosopher), political philosopher, professor of political economy at the University of Manchester
- John O'Neill (political activist) (born 1946), fervent opponent of John Kerry and a leader of the groups Swift Vets and POWs for Truth
- John O'Neill (Wisconsin politician) (1830–?), Wisconsin state assemblyman
- John O'Neill, 1st Viscount O'Neill (1740–1798), Irish politician
- John O'Neill, 3rd Viscount O'Neill (1780–1855), Irish Tory politician
- John A. O'Neill (died 1892), American steel engraver and mayor of Hoboken, New Jersey
- John J. O'Neill (American politician) (1846–1898), Missouri congressman
- John Joseph O'Neill (British politician) (1888–1953), Liberal Party politician in England, member of parliament for Lancaster 1923–1924
- John Raymond O'Neill (1891–1951), Conservative member of the Canadian House of Commons
- St John O'Neill (1741–1790) represented Randalstown in the Irish House of Commons

== Sports ==
- John O'Neill (Australian rules footballer) (born 1935), Geelong player during the 1950s
- John O'Neill (baseball), baseball player
- John O'Neill (field hockey) (born 1968), American former field hockey player
- John O'Neill (footballer, born 1935) (1935–2012), Republic of Ireland and Preston North End player
- John O'Neill (footballer, born 1958), Northern Ireland player
- John O'Neill (footballer, born 1974), former Scottish football player with Queen of the South and former manager of Stirling Albion
- John O'Neill (rugby league) (1943–1999), Australian rugby league footballer and coach
- John O'Neill (rugby union, born 1973), Irish rugby union player
- John O'Neill (rugby union, born 1932), Australian rugby union player
- John O'Neill (Limerick hurler), from the 1994 All-Ireland Senior Hurling Championship final
- John O'Neill (Tipperary hurler) (born 1990), Irish hurler
- John O'Neill (runner), American steeplechase runner, 2nd at the 1925 USA Outdoor Track and Field Championships
- Jonjo O'Neill (horse racing) (John Joseph O'Neill, born 1952), Irish jockey

== Other ==
- John O'Neill, architect who oversaw the completion of St Peter's Cathedral, Belfast
- John O'Neill (businessman) (born 1951), CEO of the Australian Rugby Union and former head of Football Federation Australia
- John O'Neill (editor), founding editor of Black Gate (magazine)
- John O'Neill (lighthouse keeper) (1768–1838), American military officer and lighthouse keeper
- John O'Neill (poet) (1777–1854), Irish shoemaker poet and playwright
- John O'Neill (VC) (1897–1942), Scottish recipient of the Victoria Cross during the First World War
- John O'Neill (video game designer) (born 1948), experimental art video game designer
- John O'Neill, 3rd Earl of Tyrone (died 1641), the son of Hugh O'Neill
- John Johnston O'Neill (1886–1966), Canadian geologist and academic
- John Joseph O'Neill (journalist) (1889–1953), winner of the Pulitzer Prize for Reporting
- John P. O'Neill (1952–2001), former FBI agent and head of security at the World Trade Center at the time of the September 11, 2001 attacks
- John S. O'Neill (born 1979), British molecular biologist
- John Michael O'Neill, Canadian Roman Catholic bishop
- John O'Neill (sociologist), Canadian sociologist, phenomenologist, and social theorist

== See also ==
- John O'Neal (disambiguation)
- John O'Neil (disambiguation)
- Jack O'Neill (disambiguation)
