= John J. O'Neill =

John J. or John Joseph O'Neill may refer to:

- John Joseph O'Neill (journalist) (1889–1953), winner of the Pulitzer Prize for Reporting
- John J. O'Neill (American politician) (John Joseph O'Neill, 1846–1898), Missouri congressman
- John Joseph O'Neill (British politician) (1888–1953), Liberal Party politician in England, member of parliament for Lancaster 1923–1924
- John Johnston O'Neill (1886–1966), Canadian geologist and academic
- John O'Neill (guitarist) (John Joseph O'Neill, born 1957), Northern Irish guitarist of rock band The Undertones
- John O'Neill (footballer, born 1974) (John Joseph O'Neill), former Scottish football player with Queen of the South and former manager of Stirling Albion
- Jonjo O'Neill (jockey) (John Joseph O'Neill, born 1952), Irish racehorse trainer and jockey
- Jack O'Neill (baseball) (John Joseph O'Neill, 1873–1935), catcher in Major League Baseball

== See also ==
- John O'Neill (disambiguation)
