= John O'Neil =

John O'Neil may refer to:

- John O'Neil (painter) (1915–2004), American painter and writer
- John O'Neil (footballer) (born 1971), Scottish footballer
- John O'Neil (rugby union) (1898–1950), American rugby union player
- John O'Neil (rugby league), English rugby league footballer who played in the 1950s and 1960s
- John O'Neil (baseball) (1920–2012), American baseball player
- John G. A. O'Neil (1937–1992), American politician from New York
- John O'Neil (priest), Irish Anglican priest
- John E. O'Neil IV, U.S. Army officer
- John Jordan O'Neil, better known as Buck O'Neil (1911–2006), American baseball player

== Fictional characters ==
- Mr. John O'Neil, a Teenage Mutant Ninja Turtles character

== See also ==
- John O'Neill (disambiguation)
- John O'Neal (disambiguation)
