= Bernie Smith =

Australian rules footballer (1927–1985)

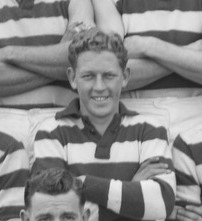

Personal information
- Full name: Bernard Keith Smith
- Born: 19 December 1927
- Died: 21 April 1985 (aged 57)
- Original team: West Adelaide (SANFL)
- Height: 175 cm (5 ft 9 in)
- Weight: 75 kg (165 lb)
- Position: back pocket

Playing career^{1}
Years	Club	Games (Goals)
1945–1947	West Adelaide (SANFL)	55 (12)
1948–1958	Geelong (VFL)	183 (3)
Total		238 (15)

Representative team honours
Years	Team	Games (Goals)
	Victoria	4
	South Australia	3
- ^{1} Playing statistics correct to the end of 1958.

Career highlights
- West Adelaide premiership player 1947; Geelong premiership player 1951, 1952; Brownlow Medal 1951; Trabilsie Medal 1947; Carji Greeves Medal 1951, 1956; All-Australian team 1953; Geelong captain 1954; Australian Football Hall of Fame inductee 1996; AFL Team of the Century (back pocket); Geelong Team of the Century (back pocket); South Australian Football Hall of Fame inductee 2002

Bernard Keith Smith (19 December 1927 – 21 April 1985) was an Australian rules footballer who represented West Adelaide in the South Australian National Football League (SANFL) and Geelong in the Victorian Football League (VFL) during the 1940s and 1950s.

Smith made his name as a back pocket player in a successful period for Geelong.

== SANFL career ==
Smith commenced his career with West Adelaide in the SANFL as a 16-year-old on 28 April 1945, playing primarily as a centre.

He won the Trabilsie Medal, West Adelaide's best and fairest award, in 1947, the same year that he played in their Grand Final triumph over Norwood, in which he was widely acknowledged as the best player afield.

Also in 1947 Smith represented South Australia at the interstate carnival, attracting the attention of the Victorian club, Geelong.

== VFL career ==
Smith was recruited to Geelong for the 1948 season and played centreman during his first few years in the (then) Victorian Football League. In 1950, coach Reg Hickey trialled Smith in the back pocket, and he adjusted quickly to the new position. 1951 was a year to remember for Smith; he won the Brownlow Medal and club best and fairest, and was among the best on ground in Geelong's 1951 premiership victory.

In combination with the dashing Fullback Bruce Morrison he created a sturdy defensive wall, and started the forward moves going again with his precision kicking. Under their leadership the Geelong defence was so strong that rival coaches had to turn their minds to finding ways through to goal.

"Bernie Smith had a big smile, fair curly hair and looked like a country boy playing a country game of football. It seemed, however, that everywhere that Bernie went the ball was sure to go.

"He was immensely popular around the club and his adopted city of Geelong."

In 1996 Smith was inducted into the Australian Football Hall of Fame. In 2002 he was one of the 113 inaugural inductees into the South Australian Football Hall of Fame.

== Bibliography ==
- Ross, John (1999). The Australian Football Hall of Fame. Australia: HarperCollinsPublishers. ISBN 0-7322-6426-X.
- Hutchinson, Col (1984). Cats' Tales. Geelong: The Geelong Advertiser. ISBN 0-9592863-1-4.
