= Geoff Williams (footballer) =

Australian rules footballer (1930–2020)

Personal information
- Born: 18 November 1930
- Died: 20 July 2020 (aged 89); Geelong
- Original team: Warragul
- Height: 183 cm (6 ft 0 in)
- Weight: 83 kg (183 lb)

Playing career^{1}
| Years | Club | Games (Goals) |
| 1952–1959 | Geelong | 121 (1) |
- ^{1} Playing statistics correct to the end of 1959.

Career highlights
- Geelong Premiership 1952; Geelong Best & Fairest 1952, 1955

Geoffrey Howard Williams OAM (18 November 1930 – 20 July 2020) was an Australian rules footballer for Geelong in the Victorian Football League (VFL).

A half-back flanker, he played in Geelong's 1952 premiership team and won the club's best and fairest award in 1952 and 1955.

He and his wife Joan had four children. He was awarded the Medal of the Order of Australia in the 2016 Australia Day honours for services "to Australian rules football, and to the community of Geelong".
