= 1951 Brownlow Medal =

- Winner: Bernie Smith (Geelong); 23 votes

The 1951 Brownlow Medal was the 24th year the award was presented to the player adjudged the fairest and best player during the Victorian Football League (VFL) home and away season. Bernie Smith of the Geelong Football Club won the medal by polling twenty-three votes during the 1951 VFL season.

== Leading votegetters ==
	Player	Votes
1st	Bernie Smith (Geelong)	23
2nd	Ron Clegg (South Melbourne)	20
3rd	Bill Hutchison (Essendon)	16
4th	Ray Poulter (Richmond)	15
=5th	Bob Rose (Collingwood)	14
=5th	Charlie Sutton (Footscray)	14
=5th	Denis Cordner (Melbourne)	14
=5th	Harold Bray (St Kilda)	14
=9th	Jim Clark (Carlton)	13
=9th	Des Rowe (Richmond)	13
