= Joseph Algernon Pearce =

Canadian astrophysicist

- Born: February 7, 1893; Brantford, Ontario
- Died: September 8, 1988 (aged 95); Victoria, British Columbia
- Education: University of Toronto; University of California
- Known for: Director of the Dominion Astrophysical Observatory
- Scientific career
- Fields: Astronomy
- Workplaces: Dominion Astrophysical Observatory

Joseph Algernon Pearce (February 7, 1893 – September 8, 1988) was a Canadian astrophysicist, who was notable for studies on the structure of Milky Way and O-type stars.

Born in Brantford, Ontario, Pearce enlisted in the Canadian Expeditionary Force in 1915 and served with the rank of Major in France until his was injured and returned to Canada as a training officer. He received a bachelor's and master's degree from the University of Toronto. He then studied at the Lick Observatory in California and received a PhD from the University of California, Berkeley in 1930. He joined the Dominion Astrophysical Observatory in Saanich, British Columbia and was appointed Assistant Director in 1935. From 1940 to 1951, he was Director.

A Fellow of the Royal Society of Canada, he served as its president from 1949 to 1950. He was president of the Royal Astronomical Society of Canada and vice-president of the American Astronomical Society.

In 1955, he was awarded an honorary Doctor of Science degree from the University of British Columbia.

He is the author of Elements of the Orbit of Reid's Comet (University of Toronto, 1922), The Minimum Masses of Three Spectroscopic Binary Stars (J.O. Patenaude, 1932), and The Spectroscopic Orbits of the Four Helium Stars H.D. 29376, H.D. 39698, H.D. 44701 and H.D. 208095. The Radial Velocity of Boss 5628 (J.O. Patenaude, 1932).

Professional and academic associations
Preceded by Gustave Lanctot	President of the Royal Society of Canada; 1949–1950	Succeeded by John Johnston O'Neill
