= Bruce Nankervis =

Australian rules footballer (born 1950)

Personal information
- Full name: Bruce Edward Nankervis
- Born: 14 August 1950 (age 76); Geelong, Victoria
- Original team: Barwon
- Position: back

Playing career
Years	Club	Games (Goals)
1970–1983	Geelong	253 (80)

Career highlights
- Carji Greeves Medal, 1973, 1974

Bruce Edward Nankervis (born 14 August 1950) is a former Australian rules footballer in the Victorian Football League for Geelong Football Club. He wore the number 33 during his tenure at the club.

Nankervis was awarded the Carji Greeves Medal in 1973 and 1974 and captained the club in 1976 and 1977 before he broke a bone in his neck that required him to travel to the United States for treatment. Nankervis was named in the Australian Rules team of the decade as a Half-Back. His older brother Ian took over the captaincy in 1978.
