= Billy McCarter =

Australian rules footballer

Personal information
- Full name: William McCarter
- Born: 23 October 1888; Geelong, Victoria
- Died: 4 September 1941 (aged 52); Geelong, Victoria
- Original team: East Geelong (GDFA)
- Debut: Round 1, 1913, Geelong vs. Richmond
- Height: 170 cm (5 ft 7 in)
- Weight: 75 kg (165 lb)

Playing career^{1}
Years	Club	Games (Goals)
1913–15; 1921–24	Geelong	114 (7)
- ^{1} Playing statistics correct to the end of 1924.

William McCarter (23 October 1888 – 4 September 1941) was an Australian rules footballer who played for Geelong in the Victorian Football League (VFL).

A back pocket player, McCarter made his debut for Geelong in 1913 in round 1 against Richmond at Corio Oval. He did not play from 1916 to 1920 as Geelong did not complete due to World War I, but was at his best when he returned in 1921, supposedly being named Geelong's club champion. He certainly won such an award in 1923, before retiring the following season. During his career he represented Victoria five times at interstate football.
