= Jim Munday =

Australian rules footballer

Personal information
- Full name: James Joseph Munday
- Born: 1 November 1917; Geelong, Victoria
- Died: 27 July 1971 (aged 53); Windsor, Victoria
- Original team: Coburg (VFA)
- Height: 188 cm (6 ft 2 in)
- Weight: 96 kg (212 lb)

Playing career^{1}
Years	Club	Games (Goals)
1944–1946	Geelong	44 (26)
- ^{1} Playing statistics correct to the end of 1946.

James Joseph Munday (1 November 1917 – 27 July 1971) was an Australian rules footballer who played with Geelong in the VFL. Munday won the 1944 Carji Greeves Medal for Geelong's best and fairest player, in his debut season.

Munday later served in the Royal Australian Air Force during World War II.
