= Jack O'Neill (disambiguation) =

Jack O'Neill is a fictional character in the Stargate film and television series .

Jack O'Neill or O'Neil may also refer to:

- Jack O'Neill (baseball) (1873–1935), Irish-American baseball player
- Jack O'Neill (businessman) (1923–2017), American surfer and businessman, founder of O'Neill, the surfwear and equipment brand
- Jack O'Neill (statistician) (1910–1998), Australian public servant
- Jack O'Neil (swimmer) (born 2003), American Paralympic swimmer
- Jack O'Neill, American rock musician, member of Jackopierce

== See also ==
- John O'Neill (disambiguation)
