= John O'Neal =

John O'Neal(l) may refer to:

- John O'Neal (Medal of Honor) (born 1841), U.S. sailor who was awarded the Medal of Honor
- John O'Neal (politician) (active since 2010), American politician in West Virginia
- John H. O'Neall (1838–1907), American politician from Indiana
- John Belton O'Neall, judge who served on the precursor to the South Carolina Supreme Court
- Johnny O'Neal (born 1956), American pianist

== See also ==
- John O'Neil (disambiguation)
- John O'Neill (disambiguation)
