= Keith Johns =

Australian rules footballer, born 1902

Personal information
- Born: 25 February 1902
- Died: 25 March 1979 (aged 77)
- Height: 183 cm (6 ft 0 in)
- Weight: 84 kg (185 lb)

Playing career^{1}
Years	Club	Games (Goals)
1919–1925	Geelong	64 (13)
- ^{1} Playing statistics correct to the end of 1925.

Keith Johns (25 February 1902 – 25 March 1979) was an Australian rules footballer who played with Geelong in the Victorian Football League (VFL). He was recruited locally.

A Best and Fairest winner in 1922, Johns was a fullback in Geelong's 1925 premiership win.
