= Jockie Jones =

Australian rules footballer

Personal information
- Born: 22 September 1898
- Died: 23 September 1965 (aged 67)
- Original team: East Geelong
- Height: 171 cm (5 ft 7 in)
- Weight: 75 kg (165 lb)

Playing career^{1}
Years	Club	Games (Goals)
1920–1926	Geelong	59 (55)
- ^{1} Playing statistics correct to the end of 1926.

John 'Jockie' Jones (22 September 1898 – 23 September 1965) was an Australian rules footballer who played with Geelong in the VFL during the 1920s.

Johns made his debut in 1920 and was Geelong's Best and Fairest winner that year. After 59 games for the club he retired in 1926.
