= David Clarke Sr. =

Australian rules footballer, born 1952

Personal information
- Born: 31 December 1952 (age 73)
- Original team: Geelong College
- Debut: Round 1, 3 April 1971, Geelong vs. St Kilda, at Kardinia Park
- Height: 184 cm (6 ft 0 in)
- Weight: 82 kg (181 lb)
- Position: Midfielder/half forward

Playing career^{1}
Years	Club	Games (Goals)
1971–1981	Geelong	202 (298)
1982	Carlton	9 (21)
Total		211 (319)
- ^{1} Playing statistics correct to the end of 1982.

Career highlights
- Geelong Best and Fairest 1971, 1978, 1979; Geelong leading goalkicker 1979; Victorian State representative 14 times; All Australian 1972

David E. Clarke (born 31 December 1952) is a former Australian rules footballer with Victorian Football League (VFL) clubs Geelong and Carlton. Better known as a half-forward flanker, Clarke also played in the centre and centre half-back positions.

Clarke won Geelong's Best and Fairest three times and was runner-up four times.

Clarke was a director of the failed Geelong based Pyramid Building Society, which collapsed in 1990 with debts of A$2 billion. He was charged with 13 breaches of the Building Societies Act and was given a two-year suspended jail sentence and fined $47,000 after pleading guilty.

Clarke's sons David and Tim played in the Australian Football League (AFL) and daughter Georgina competed at the 2000 Summer Olympics in Sydney as a 16-year-old, reaching the semi-finals in the Women's 1500m.
