= Jim Knight (footballer) =

Australian rules footballer

Personal information
- Full name: James Bell Knight
- Born: 3 January 1918; Geelong, Victoria
- Died: 11 October 1943 (aged 25) off Goodenough Island, Territory of New Guinea
- Original team: Presbyterian Guild
- Height: 173 cm (5 ft 8 in)
- Weight: 73 kg (161 lb)

Playing career^{1}
Years	Club	Games (Goals)
1939–1941	Geelong	42 (54)
1942–1943	Carlton	15 (7)
Total		57 (61)
- ^{1} Playing statistics correct to the end of 1943.

James Bell Knight (3 January 1918 – 11 October 1943) was an Australian rules footballer who played with Geelong and Carlton in the VFL.

== Family ==
James Bell Knight, the son of Archie Cecil Clarence Knight (1896–1965), and Margaret May Knight (1892–1960), née Paterson, was born on 3 January 1918.

== Football ==
=== Geelong ===
Knight was Geelong's best and fairest player in 1941.

=== Carlton ===
He joined Carlton in 1942 after Geelong withdrew from the competition due to the war and spent two seasons with the club.

== Military service ==
While playing at Carlton he received military training; and, in 1943, he joined the RAAF, and served in Papua New Guinea, fighting against the Japanese.

He was killed on 11 October 1943 when the bombs aboard his Douglas Boston bomber (A28-26) exploded after the aircraft crashed during take-off from Goodenough Island in Papua New Guinea. The other two crew members survived the accident.

== Remembered ==
The runner up in the Geelong Best and Fairest now wins the Jim Knight Memorial Trophy.

== See also ==
- List of Victorian Football League players who died on active service
