= Dick Grigg =

Australian rules footballer

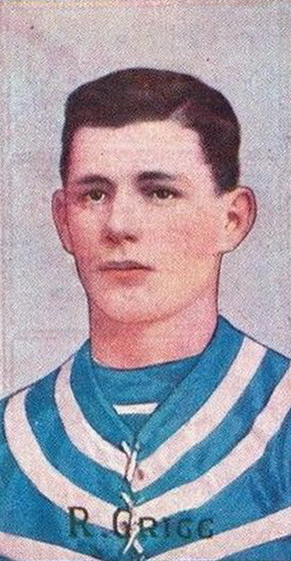
- Cigarette card of Grigg in 1909

Personal information
- Born: 8 June 1885; Bellarine, Victoria
- Died: 12 November 1972 (aged 87); North Geelong, Victoria
- Original team: Drysdale
- Debut: Round 1, 7 May 1904, Geelong vs. Collingwood, at Victoria Park

Playing career^{1}
Years	Club	Games (Goals)
1904–14; 1921	Geelong	194 (64)
- ^{1} Playing statistics correct to the end of 1921.

Career highlights
- Geelong Best and Fairest 1910, 1911, 1912, 1914; Geelong Team of the Century (Half-back)

Richard Randolph Grigg (8 June 1885 – 12 November 1972) was an Australian rules footballer for the Geelong Football Club in the Victorian Football League, now Australian Football League.

== Family ==
The son of Thomas Tobias Grigg (1851–1930), and Katherine Douglas Grigg (1854–1946), née Williamson, Richard Randolph Grigg was born at Bellarine, Victoria on 8 June 1885. One of his brothers, Norman Cecil Grigg (1893–1945), also played VFL football with Geelong.

He married Lyla Daphne Calhoun (1888–1957), at the Cairns Memorial Presbyterian Church, in Melbourne, on 19 June 1915. They had three children.

== Football ==
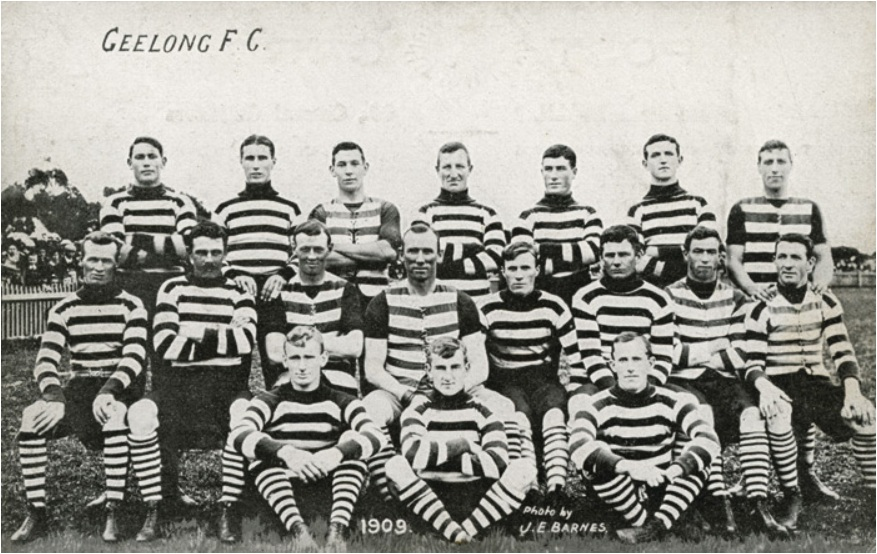
Geelong Football Team (1909). Grigg is third from right, middle row.

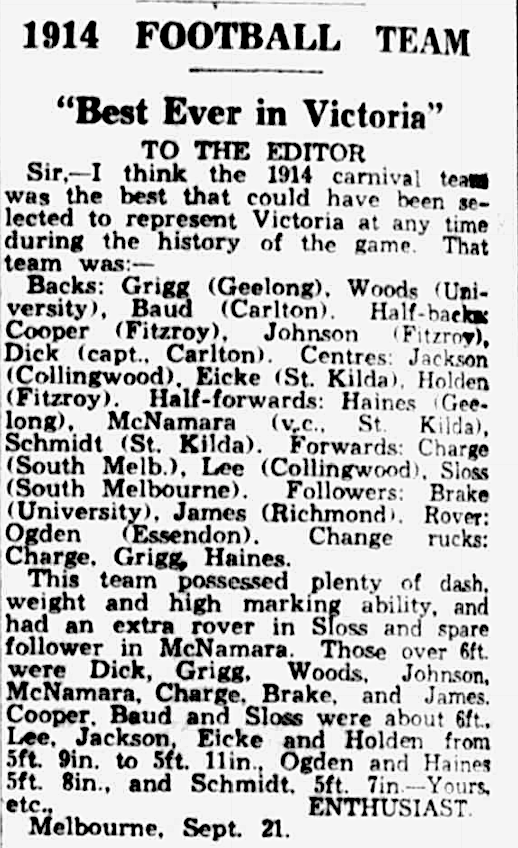
Enthusiast's Letter to the Editor The Herald, 21 September 1934.

=== Geelong (VFL) ===
Grigg played 130 consecutive matches between 1904 and 1914, a Geelong record that stands as of 2023. After seven years out of VFL circles, he made a brief comeback to play the final two matches of 1921, at the age of 36. He was a captain for two matches.

==== Best and Fairest ====
He won Geelong's Best and Fairest award four times: 1910, 1911, 1912 and 1914.

=== Representative football ===
He represented Victoria in interstate matches on nine occasions.

== Geelong's "Team of the Century" ==
He was named in Geelong's Team of the Century.

== Geelong's "Hall of Fame" ==
In 2007 he was elevated to legend status in the Geelong Hall of Fame.

== Death ==
He died at North Geelong, Victoria on 12 November 1972.

== See also ==
- 1914 Sydney Carnival
