= Ian Nankervis =

Australian rules footballer (born 1948)

Personal information
- Full name: Ian James Nankervis
- Born: 3 January 1948 (age 78); Bendigo, Victoria, Australia
- Height: 183 cm (6 ft 0 in)
- Weight: 73 kg (161 lb)
- Position: Forward pocket–rover / Back pocket

Playing career^{1}
Years	Club	Games (Goals)
1967 – 1983	Geelong	325 (203)
- ^{1} Playing statistics correct to the end of 1983.

Ian James Nankervis (born 3 January 1948) is a former Australian rules footballer for the Geelong Football Club in the Victorian Football League (VFL). Nankervis played for Geelong for 17 seasons and was captain from 1978 to 1981, and again in 1983. Nankervis held the record of most senior level games for Geelong with 325 VFL games. Nankervis also represented Victoria at state level on 12 occasions.

== VFL career ==
Nankervis was recruited from Barwon. Initially he played mainly as a forward pocket-rover, scoring a creditable 203 goals. He later developed into one of the finest back pockets in the VFL after then coach Rodney Olsson shifted him to that end of the ground

Nankervis was awarded the club's best and fairest award, the Carji Greeves Medal on three occasions in 1972, 1976 and 1977 and captained the team from 1978 until 1982 (110 games). Nankervis wore a guernsey with the number 40 during his tenure at the club. His brother Bruce Nankervis also played for Geelong.

In 2001 he was named in the Geelong Football Club Team of the Century and in 2005 was inducted into the Australian Football Hall of Fame.

== Honours ==
Individual:

- VFL:
  - Victorian team representative honours: 12 matches (captain in 1979)
  - All-Australian: 1980
  - Member of the Australian Football Hall of Fame: 2005 induction
- Geelong Football Club:
  - Carji Greeves Medal: 1972, 1976, 1977
  - Geelong F.C. Leading Club Goalkicker Award: 1975 (equal with Larry Donohue)
  - Geelong F.C. captain: 1978 – 1981, 1983
  - Member of the Geelong F.C. Team of the Century: 2001 induction
- Records:
  - Held the record of most games played for Geelong F.C. (325 games) until Corey Enright played his 326th game in Round 19, 2016. Enright's record was surpassed by Joel Selwood who played his 333rd game in a Semi Final on 3 September 2021 – leaving Nankervis in 3rd place.

== Personal life ==
After retiring from football, Nankervis taught physical education and science at a high school level on Queensland's Sunshine Coast. He had also taught at Corio Technical School in Geelong during the 1970s and 1980s.
