= Geoff Mahon =

Australian rules footballer, born 1915

Personal information
- Full name: Geoffrey Mahon
- Born: 24 April 1915; Geelong, Victoria
- Died: 16 February 1971 (aged 55)
- Height: 183 cm (6 ft 0 in)
- Weight: 94 kg (207 lb)

Playing career^{1}
Years	Club	Games (Goals)
1936–40, 1946	Geelong	82 (35)
- ^{1} Playing statistics correct to the end of 1946.

Geoff Mahon (24 April 1915 – 16 February 1971) was an Australian rules footballer who played with Geelong in the VFL.

A ruckman, Mahon debuted for Geelong in 1936 and the following season was a reserve in their premiership side. He played for Geelong for five years before crossing to Victorian Football Association club Prahran without a clearance in 1941. He returned to Geelong in 1946 and won Geelong's best and fairest.
