= John O'Neill (philosopher) =

Professor of philosophy and political economy

John F. O'Neill

Philosophical work
- Era: 20th-century philosophy
- Region: Western philosophy
- School: Analytic philosophy
- Main interests: Political philosophy, market, ethics, environmental philosophy, ecological economics

John F. O'Neill is a philosopher. He is professor of political economy at the University of Manchester. He has published on subjects related to political economy and philosophy, philosophy and environmental policy, political theory, environmental ethics, and the philosophy of science.

== Academic history ==
John O'Neill held the post of professor of philosophy at Lancaster University.

Previously, he was on the faculty of the University of Sussex and the University of Wales.

== Critical reaction ==
Reviewing O'Neill's book The Market: Ethics, Knowledge and Politics, Mark Peacock wrote that "O'Neill defends an Aristotelian perfectionism which allows for a plurality of goods pursued for their own sake. [...] The argument is sound, but does not answer the liberal objection to Aristotle that individuals must be allowed to pursue what they believe to be the good."

== Selected works ==
Books

- O'Neill, John; Light, Andrew; Holland, Alan (2008). Environmental Values. London: Routledge. ISBN 978-0415145091.
- O'Neill, John (2007). Markets, Deliberation and Environment. London: Routledge.
- O'Neill, John (1998). The Market: Ethics, Knowledge and Politics. Routledge. ISBN 978-0-415-15422-2.
- Hayward, Tim; O'Neill, John, eds. (1997). Justice, Property and the Environment: Social and Legal Perspectives. Avebury Series in Philosophy. Aldershot: Ashgate Publishing.

Articles

- O'Neill, John (2019). "Food, needs and commons". In Vivero Pol, Jose Luis; Ferrando, Tomaso; Schutter, Olivier de; Mattei, Ugo (eds.). Routledge Handbook of Food as a Commons. Routledge handbooks. Abingdon; New York: Routledge. pp. 103–120. doi:10.4324/9781315161495-7. ISBN 9781138062627. OCLC 1048659357.
- O'Neill, John (2018). "Environmental markets". In Castree, Noel; Hulme, Mike; Proctor, James D. (eds.). Companion to Environmental Studies. London; New York: Routledge. pp. 640–644. doi:10.4324/9781315640051-125. ISBN 9781138192201. OCLC 1004920282.
- O'Neill, John (2018). "How not to argue against growth: happiness, austerity and inequality". In Rosa, Hartmut; Henning, Christoph (eds.). The Good Life Beyond Growth: New Perspectives. Routledge studies in ecological economics. London; New York: Routledge. pp. 141–152. doi:10.4324/9781315542126-12. ISBN 9781138687882. OCLC 999673721.
- O'Neill, John (July 2017). "The price of an apology: justice, compensation and rectification". Cambridge Journal of Economics. 41 (4): 1043–1059. doi:10.1093/cje/bew047.
- O'Neill, John; Uebel, Thomas E. (2015). "Analytical philosophy and ecological economics". In Martínez Alier, Juan; Muradian, Roldan (eds.). Handbook of Ecological Economics. Cheltenham, UK; Northampton, MA: Edward Elgar Publishing. pp. 48–73. doi:10.4337/9781783471416.00007. ISBN 9781783471409. OCLC 919108216.
- O'Neill, John (2007). "Pluralism and economic institutions". In Nemeth, Elisabeth; Schmitz, Stefan W.; Uebel, Thomas E. (eds.). Otto Neurath's economics in context. Vienna Circle Institute yearbook. Vol. 13. Dordrecht; New York: Springer-Verlag. pp. 77–100. doi:10.1007/978-1-4020-6905-5_5. ISBN 9781402069048. OCLC 272308846.
- O'Neill, John (March 2006). "Knowledge, planning, and markets: a missing chapter in the socialist calculation debates". Economics & Philosophy. 22 (1): 55–78. doi:10.1017/S0266267105000702. S2CID 154580968.
- O'Neill, John F. (September 2003). "Unified science as political philosophy: positivism, pluralism and liberalism". Studies in History and Philosophy of Science Part A. 34 (3): 575–596. Bibcode:2003SHPSA..34..575O. doi:10.1016/S0039-3681(03)00048-7.
- O'Neill, John (June 1998). "Against reductionist explanations of human behaviour". Proceedings of the Aristotelian Society, Supplementary Volumes. 72 (1): 173–188. doi:10.1111/1467-8349.00041. JSTOR 4107016.
