= Don Bauer =

Australian rules footballer

Personal information
- Full name: Donald Charles Bauer
- Born: 17 May 1922; Colac, Victoria
- Died: 15 January 1996 (aged 73)
- Original team: Chilwell
- Height: 178 cm (5 ft 10 in)
- Weight: 87 kg (192 lb)

Playing career^{1}
Years	Club	Games (Goals)
1943	Footscray	10 (0)
1945–1949	Geelong	71 (0)
Total		81 (0)
- ^{1} Playing statistics correct to the end of 1949.

Donald Charles Bauer (17 May 1922 – 15 January 1996) was an Australian rules footballer who played with Footscray and Geelong in the Victorian Football League (VFL).

Bauer, who served in the Royal Australian Air Force during the Second World War, was from Chilwell in Geelong but could not play for his local VFL club in 1943 as they were in recess. He instead made 10 senior appearances for Footscray. A defender, Bauer joined Geelong midway through the 1945 season and from then until 1949 was a regular fixture in the team. Bauer joined City in the Northern Tasmanian Football Association at the end of the 1949 VFL season, as captain-coach. He had been offered the job a year earlier but was refused a clearance by Geelong. In his only season, Bauer guided City to the grand final, which they lost to North Launceston by 30 points.

In 1951 he left Tasmania and became captain-coach of Ballarat Football League side Geelong West. He remained in the role for two years. He was senior coach of Newtown & Chilwell in 1958.
