= Ralph Patman =

Australian rules footballer

Personal information
- Full name: Ralph D. Patman
- Born: 10 January 1916
- Died: 16 May 2009 (aged 93)
- Original team: East Geelong
- Height: 175 cm (5 ft 9 in)
- Weight: 83 kg (183 lb)

Playing career^{1}
Years	Club	Games (Goals)
1943	Fitzroy	1 (0)
1944–1945	Geelong	38 (11)
Total		39 (11)
- ^{1} Playing statistics correct to the end of 1945.

Ralph D. Patman (10 January 1916 – 16 May 2009) was an Australian rules footballer who played with Fitzroy and Geelong in the Victorian Football League (VFL).

Patman was already 27 when he started his VFL career at Fitzroy, where he came to from East Geelong. He played three games in the seconds before making his only senior appearance, in Fitzroy's round seven win over Footscray in the 1943 VFL season.

Playing mostly as a follower, Patman spent the 1944 and 1945 seasons with Geelong and didn't miss a single game either year. In 1945 he played well enough to finish second, to Jim Fitzgerald, in Geelong's best and fairest count.

He joined Wimmera Football League club Nhill in 1946, as coach. During the 1950 season, Patman kicked 13 goals in a game against Rupanyup, just three short of Bill Smeaton's league record.
