= Corey Enright =

Australian rules footballer (born 1981)

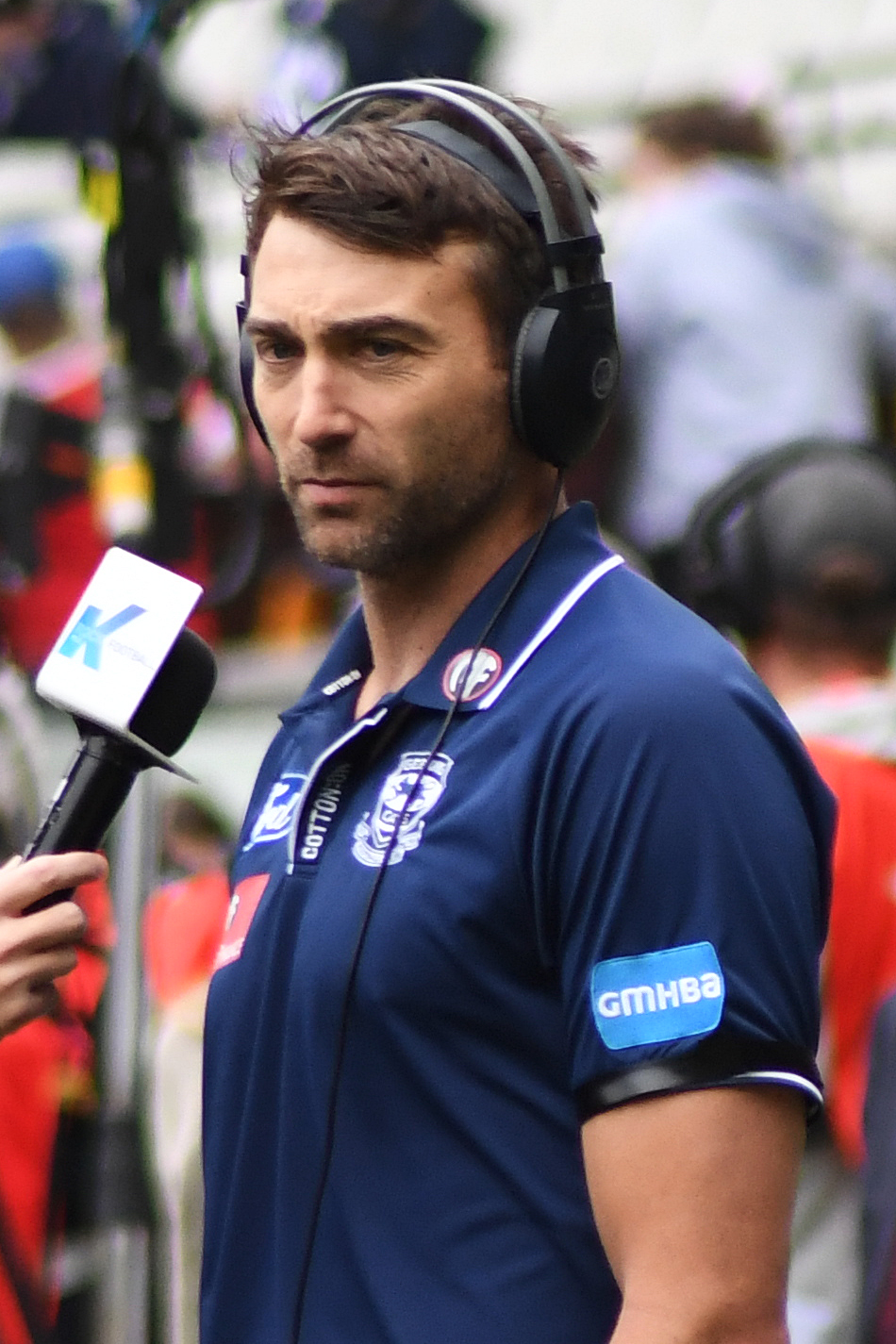
- Enright with Geelong in April 2019

Personal information
- Full name: Corey Enright
- Nickname: Boris
- Born: 14 September 1981 (age 45); Kimba, South Australia
- Original team: Port Adelaide (SANFL)
- Draft: No. 47, 1999 national draft
- Height: 187 cm (6 ft 2 in)
- Weight: 90 kg (198 lb)
- Position: Defender

Playing career^{1}
| Years | Club | Games (Goals) |
| 2001–2016 | Geelong | 332 (66) |
- ^{1} Playing statistics correct to the end of 2016.

Career highlights
- 3× AFL Premiership (2007, 2009, 2011); 2× Carji Greeves Medal (2009, 2011); 6× All-Australian team (2008, 2009, 2010, 2011, 2013, 2016); 2× AFL Pre-Season Premiership (2006, 2009); AFL Rising Star nominee: 2001; Australian Football Hall of Fame: Inductee 2023

Corey Enright (born 14 September 1981) is a former professional Australian rules footballer who played for the Geelong Football Club in the Australian Football League (AFL). He has played the third-most games for Geelong. Enright is currently defence coach at St Kilda, after coaching at Geelong from 2017 to 2020.

== Early life ==
Enright grew up in the town of Kimba, South Australia and played for the Kimba District Tigers in the Eastern Eyre Football League. He was recruited from the Port Adelaide Magpies, selected by Geelong with the 47th overall pick in the 1999 National Draft.

== Playing career ==
=== Geelong ===
Like many of his teammates, Enright was outstanding in 2007. He was among the Cats best in the Grand Final win over Port Adelaide, gathering 29 possessions.

The 2008 season saw Enright become a household name with his first All-Australian selection. He was again pivotal in the Grand Final, recording 25 disposals in the Cats' 26-point loss to Hawthorn.

In 2009, following another strong season in defence, Enright was selected in the All-Australian team for the second time, this time in the starting lineup. He was also voted by his peers as the league's most underrated player.

2010 saw a third successive selection in the All-Australian team in which he followed up with a fourth successive selection in 2011, the last three selections as a starting back pocket.

At Geelong Corey also won his two Club Best and Fairest "Carji Greeves" Medals in the Premiership Years 2009 and 2011.

Enright joins an elite AFL group who have won multiple club best and fairest medals in premiership years. This group includes Leigh Matthews, Kevin Bartlett, Jason Dunstall, Simon Black, Michael Voss and Josh Gibson.

On the night of the 2011 Carji Greeves Medal presentation, coach Chris Scott introduced Corey Enright as "still the most underrated player in the competition".

Enright made Geelong history after overtaking the previous record of 325 games held by Ian Nankervis in round 19, 2016 against the Western Bulldogs at Simonds Stadium. On 3 September 2021, in the Cats' semi-final against Greater Western Sydney, his record was overtaken by Joel Selwood. (Then overtaken again by Tom Hawkins in 2024)

After the conclusion of the 2016 season, Enright announced his retirement from the AFL.

== Statistics ==
Legend
| G | Goals | K | Kicks | D | Disposals | T | Tackles |
| B | Behinds | H | Handballs | M | Marks |

| Season | Team | No. | Games | Totals | | | | | | | Averages (per game) | | | | | | |
| Season | Team | No. | Games | G | B | K | H | D | M | T | G | B | K | H | D | M | T |
|---|---|---|---|---|---|---|---|---|---|---|---|---|---|---|---|---|---|
| 2001 | Geelong | 44 | 17 | 5 | 5 | 116 | 87 | 203 | 56 | 20 | 0.3 | 0.3 | 6.8 | 5.1 | 11.9 | 3.3 | 1.2 |
| 2002 | Geelong | 44 | 16 | 3 | 2 | 180 | 117 | 297 | 54 | 27 | 0.2 | 0.1 | 11.3 | 7.3 | 18.6 | 3.4 | 1.7 |
| 2003 | Geelong | 44 | 22 | 3 | 6 | 240 | 174 | 414 | 117 | 40 | 0.1 | 0.3 | 10.9 | 7.9 | 18.8 | 5.3 | 1.8 |
| 2004 | Geelong | 44 | 9 | 0 | 1 | 67 | 41 | 108 | 27 | 15 | 0.0 | 0.1 | 7.4 | 4.6 | 12.0 | 3.0 | 1.7 |
| 2005 | Geelong | 44 | 15 | 8 | 6 | 168 | 109 | 277 | 79 | 23 | 0.5 | 0.4 | 11.2 | 7.3 | 18.5 | 5.3 | 1.5 |
| 2006 | Geelong | 44 | 22 | 11 | 2 | 327 | 164 | 491 | 139 | 64 | 0.5 | 0.1 | 14.9 | 7.5 | 22.3 | 6.3 | 2.9 |
| 2007 | Geelong | 44 | 24 | 9 | 5 | 323 | 226 | 549 | 139 | 51 | 0.4 | 0.2 | 13.5 | 9.4 | 22.9 | 5.8 | 2.1 |
| 2008 | Geelong | 44 | 25 | 6 | 2 | 299 | 282 | 581 | 133 | 70 | 0.2 | 0.1 | 12.0 | 11.3 | 23.2 | 5.3 | 2.8 |
| 2009 | Geelong | 44 | 25 | 4 | 2 | 343 | 285 | 628 | 142 | 71 | 0.2 | 0.1 | 13.7 | 11.4 | 25.1 | 5.7 | 2.8 |
| 2010 | Geelong | 44 | 24 | 1 | 1 | 360 | 222 | 582 | 136 | 69 | 0.0 | 0.0 | 15.0 | 9.3 | 24.3 | 5.7 | 2.9 |
| 2011 | Geelong | 44 | 23 | 1 | 0 | 330 | 183 | 513 | 144 | 64 | 0.0 | 0.0 | 14.3 | 8.0 | 22.3 | 6.3 | 2.8 |
| 2012 | Geelong | 44 | 22 | 2 | 3 | 283 | 179 | 462 | 126 | 53 | 0.1 | 0.1 | 12.9 | 8.1 | 21.0 | 5.7 | 2.4 |
| 2013 | Geelong | 44 | 22 | 1 | 4 | 324 | 166 | 490 | 152 | 41 | 0.0 | 0.2 | 14.7 | 7.5 | 22.3 | 6.9 | 1.9 |
| 2014 | Geelong | 44 | 22 | 8 | 4 | 255 | 207 | 462 | 114 | 61 | 0.4 | 0.2 | 11.6 | 9.4 | 21.0 | 5.2 | 2.8 |
| 2015 | Geelong | 44 | 21 | 0 | 1 | 301 | 183 | 484 | 148 | 60 | 0.0 | 0.0 | 14.3 | 8.7 | 23.0 | 7.0 | 2.9 |
| 2016 | Geelong | 44 | 23 | 4 | 2 | 322 | 220 | 542 | 130 | 66 | 0.2 | 0.1 | 14.0 | 9.6 | 23.6 | 5.6 | 2.9 |
| Career | | | 332 | 66 | 46 | 4238 | 2845 | 7003 | 1836 | 795 | 0.2 | 0.1 | 12.8 | 8.6 | 21.3 | 5.5 | 2.4 |

== Coaching career ==
Enright joined Geelong's coaching team for the 2017 season, beginning as a development coach before becoming an assistant coach and helping Geelong reach finals in each year of his tenure. Ahead of the 2022 season, Enright joined St Kilda as an assistant coach.
