= John O'Neill (poet) =

John O'Neill (8 January 1777 – 1854) was an Irish writer, poet and playwright.

He was born into a poor family in Waterford. At the age of nine he was apprenticed to a relative, who was a shoe-maker. In 1798 he was living in Carrick-on-Suir, where he married. He wrote a number of popular songs around this time, the best-known being a satire, "The Clothier's Looking-Glass". He next went to London, where he formed a large circle of acquaintances, among them George Cruikshank, who illustrated some of his poems ("The Drunkard", 1840, "The Blessings of Temperance", 1851, "The Triumph of Temperance", 1852). He wrote Alva, a drama, in 1821 and he enjoyed some popularity as a temperance poet. His business ventures were not successful and he had a large family to support. At the end of his life, he was also working as a shoe-maker in Drury Lane. His last book, "Legends of Carrick" (edited by Mrs. S. C. Hall), was published in 1854.
