= John O'Neill (Australian rules footballer) =

Australian rules footballer

Personal information
- Full name: John Gerard O'Neill
- Born: 30 August 1935
- Died: 29 February 2024 (aged 88)
- Original team: Warrnambool
- Height: 174 cm (5 ft 9 in)
- Weight: 72 kg (159 lb)

Playing career^{1}
Years	Club	Games (Goals)
1954–1962	Geelong	136 (20)
- ^{1} Playing statistics correct to the end of 1962.

John O'Neill (30 August 1935 – 29 February 2024) was a former Australian rules footballer who played with Geelong in the VFL.

O'Neill usually played as a wingman or half forward flanker and was often one of his side's biggest disposal getters.

He won a Carji Greeves Medal in 1958 for Geelong's best and fairest player and represented Victoria four times in interstate matches during his career.

He also captained five games for Geelong and after he retired, he became the assistant coach of the club.
