= Leo Dean =

Australian rules footballer, born 1914

Personal information
- Full name: Edward Leo Dean
- Born: 4 October 1914; Geelong, Victoria
- Died: 22 August 1985 (aged 70)
- Original team: North Geelong
- Height: 168 cm (5 ft 6 in)
- Weight: 73 kg (161 lb)
- Position: Wing / Utility

Playing career^{1}
Years	Club	Games (Goals)
1935–41, 1944–45	Geelong	60 (1)
- ^{1} Playing statistics correct to the end of 1945.

Edward Leo Dean (4 October 1914 – 22 August 1985) was an Australian rules footballer who played with Geelong in the Victorian Football League (VFL).
