= Peter Pianto =

Australian rules footballer and coach

Personal information
- Born: 25 November 1929; Eaglehawk, Victoria
- Died: 18 February 2008 (aged 78); Geelong, Victoria
- Original team: Eaglehawk
- Height: 170 cm (5 ft 7 in)
- Weight: 70 kg (154 lb)

Playing career^{1}
Years	Club	Games (Goals)
1951–1957	Geelong	121 (144)
1961–1963	Claremont	43 (36)
Total		164 (180)

Representative team honours
Years	Team	Games (Goals)
	Victoria	9 (?)

Coaching career
Years	Club	Games (W–L–D)
1966–1970	Geelong	105 (70–34–1)
- ^{1} Playing statistics correct to the end of 1957.

Career highlights
- 2× VFL Premiership player: (1951, 1952); Carji Greeves Medal: (1953); All-Australian team: (1956); VFL/AFL Italian Team of the Century 2007; Geelong Team of the Century - Forward pocket

Peter Pianto (25 November 1929 – 18 February 2008) was an Australian rules footballer who played for the Geelong Football Club in the Victorian Football League (VFL) and the Claremont Football Club in the West Australian National Football League (WANFL) and later coached Geelong, replacing teammate Bob Davis.

Pianto was a brilliant rover who was recruited from Eaglehawk and he chose to join Geelong because of its country atmosphere, after having offers from four league clubs. He played 121 games and kicked 144 goals over seven years with the Cats, mainly playing as a rover and he was a premiership player with Geelong in 1951 and 1952. One of his most memorable efforts was his career high five goal performance in the 1953 semi final against Collingwood. During his career Pianto was a best and fairest winner, All-Australian and Victorian interstate representative. He polled well in the Brownlow Medal counts, finishing fourth in 1952 and second in 1956.

Pianto played for Victoria nine times and won the club best and fairest in 1953. After retiring from the VFL in 1957, he coached Colac and then Claremont as captain-coach for three years between 1961 and 1963, before returning to Geelong to coach them between 1966 and 1970, including the 1967 VFL Grand Final. Pianto is a member of the Geelong Football Club Hall of Fame and Team of the Century.

In 1970 Pianto was appointed State coach for the VFL's interstate matches against South Australia and Western Australia.

In his later life he was a member of the club's history and tradition committee.

Upon news of his death in 2008, Geelong's acting CEO Stuart Fox released the following statement:

"Peter was an outstanding person who served the club in many capacities for over 50 years. Peter was a brilliant premiership player, and later he coached the club and took is to the 1967 grand final. In recent times he was a member of the club's history and tradition committee. Peter was a warm and friendly man and was popular with everyone associated with the club. His former teammates, those that played under him when he was a coach and all that came in contact with him through the tours he conducted were touched in some way by him. Peter will be sadly missed and we offer our deepest condolences to his family and friends at this sad time."

== Bibliography ==
- Holmesby, Russell; Main, Jim (2002). The Encyclopedia of AFL Footballers: every AFL/VFL player since 1897 (4th ed.). Melbourne, Victoria: Crown Content. p. 519. ISBN 1-74095-001-1.
