= John O'Neil (painter) =

American painter

John O'Neil (1915-2004) was a painter, educator and writer best known for his Abstract Imagery and Early Modern (before 1950) styles.

O'Neil was born in Kansas City, Missouri in 1915. He received his Bachelor of Fine Arts from the University of Oklahoma in 1936, and his Master of Fine Arts in painting from the University of Oklahoma in 1939. He studied at the Colorado Springs Arts Center, with Boardman Robinson, Paul Burlin and Henry Varnum Poor; Taos School of Art, with Emil Bisttram and Studio Hinna in Rome, Italy from 1951-52. He became a professor of painting at the University of Oklahoma in 1939 and was a contributing writer to Art Education magazine in the 1960s. He died in Houston, Texas in 2004.

His works have been exhibited at: the Art Institute of Chicago, the Carnegie Institute, the Colorado Springs Fine Arts Center, the Denver Art Museum and the World's Fair in New York, 1939.

John O’Neil was the founder of the Art Department at Rice University. He served as chair many years. He died October 11, 2004.
