= Bruce Morrison (footballer) =

Australian rules footballer

Personal information
- Full name: Russell Bruce Morrison
- Born: 19 June 1923; Bairnsdale
- Died: 12 April 2012 (aged 88); Geelong, Victoria
- Original team: Bairnsdale
- Height: 180 cm (5 ft 11 in)
- Weight: 82 kg (181 lb)

Playing career^{1}
Years	Club	Games (Goals)
1948–1954	Geelong	130 (0)
- ^{1} Playing statistics correct to the end of 1954.

Career highlights
- Geelong premiership player 1951, 1952; Carji Greeves Medal 1948; Victorian representative 1949

Bruce Morrison (19 June 1923 – 12 April 2012) was an Australian rules footballer who played for the Geelong Football Club in the Victorian Football League (VFL).

"Joey" Morrison was recruited from Bairnsdale, Victoria after winning the 1947 Gippsland Football League best and fairest, Trood award and a best on ground performance in their 1947 premiership win against Sale.

Morrison became a highly regarded full-back for the Geelong Football Club. He played 130 games for Geelong and won a string of awards in his first season of VFL football, winning the 1948 club best and fairest, best first year player, Geelong Workers Club best and fairest award and the Geelong Advertiser Trophy.

He was well remembered for a particular kick against the Footscray at Whitten Oval. When he was playing at full-back, he tried to kick the ball out after a behind was scored but the wind was so strong that when he kicked the ball it floated over his head and through the goals. The goal umpire signalled it as a rushed behind.
