= John Johnston O'Neill =

Canadian geologist and academic

- Born: November 12, 1886; Port Colborne, Ontario
- Died: June 1, 1966 (aged 79); Ottawa, Ontario
- Education: McGill University; Yale University
- Scientific career
- Fields: Geology

John Johnston O'Neill (November 12, 1886 – June 1, 1966) was a Canadian geologist and academic.

Born in Port Colborne, Ontario, the son of Thomas John O'Neill, an Irish immigrant, and Mary Jane Henderson, O'Neill received a Bachelor of Science and Master of Science degrees in geology and mining from McGill University in 1909 and 1910. He earned a Ph.D. in structural geology and petrography from Yale University in 1912. From 1912 to 1913, he did postdoctoral work at the University of Wisconsin.

O'Neill worked for the Geological Survey of Canada from 1909 to 1913 and from 1914 to 1920. In 1913, he spent a year as a geologist on Vilhjalmur Stefansson's Canadian Arctic Expedition. In 1920, he worked for the Whitehall Petroleum Co. in India. In 1921, he was appointed assistant professor of geology at McGill University. In 1929, he became head of the Department of Geology. From 1935 to 1939, he was dean of science. He also served as dean of graduate studies and research (1938–1942) and dean of engineering (1942–1952). From 1948 to 1952, he was a vice-principal. He retired in 1952.

A Fellow of the Royal Society of Canada, he was its president from 1950 to 1951. He was a founder, governor, and board chairman of the Arctic Institute of North America. In 1999 a new mineral from Mont Saint-Hilaire was named "oneillite" in his honour.

He died in Ottawa in 1966.

Professional and academic associations
Preceded by Joseph Algernon Pearce	President of the Royal Society of Canada; 1950–1951	Succeeded by Henry Angus
