= List of Geelong Football Club individual awards and records =

This is a list of individual awards achieved by the Geelong Football Club since it joined the Victorian Football League in 1897.

== VFL/AFL ==
=== Awards ===
| Award | Year | Player | Ref. |
|---|---|---|---|
| AFL Army Award | 2009 | Tom Hawkins | |
| AFL Rising Star | 2007 | Joel Selwood | |
| AFL Rising Star | 2024 | Oliver Dempsey | |
| AFLCA Assistant coach of the Year | 2010 | Brendan McCartney | |
| AFLCA Best Young Player | 2008 | Joel Selwood | |
| AFLCA Best Young Player | 2018 | Tom Stewart | |
| AFLCA Best Young Player | 2025 | Shaun Mannagh | |
| AFLCA Champion Player of the Year | 2007 | Gary Ablett Jr. | |
| AFLCA Champion Player of the Year | 2008 | Gary Ablett Jr. | |
| AFLCA Champion Player of the Year | 2009 | Gary Ablett Jr. | |
| AFLCA Champion Player of the Year | 2016 | Patrick Dangerfield | |
| AFLCA Champion Player of the Year | 2025 | Bailey Smith (joint winner with Noah Anderson of Gold Coast) | |
| AFLCA Coaching Legend Award | 2011 | Tom Hafey (also coached Richmond, Collingwood and Sydney) | |
| AFLCA Coaching Legend Award | 2017 | Malcolm Blight (also coached North Melbourne, Adelaide and St Kilda) | |
| AFLCA Development coach of the Year | 2026 | Nigel Lappin | |
| AFLPA Best Captain | 2008 | Tom Harley | |
| AFLPA Best Captain | 2013 | Joel Selwood | |
| AFLPA Best First-Year Player | 2007 | Joel Selwood | |
| AFLPA Best First-Year Player | 2018 | Tim Kelly | |
| AFMA Player of the Year | 1993 | Gary Ablett Sr. | |
| AFMA Player of the Year | 2007 | Gary Ablett Jr. | |
| Allan Jeans Senior Coach of the Year (AFLCA Coach of the Year) | 2007 | Mark Thompson | |
| Allan Jeans Senior Coach of the Year (AFLCA Coach of the Year) | 2008 | Mark Thompson | |
| Brownlow Medal | 1924 | Edward Greeves | |
| Brownlow Medal | 1951 | Bernie Smith | |
| Brownlow Medal | 1962 | Alistair Lord | |
| Brownlow Medal | 1989 | Paul Couch | |
| Brownlow Medal | 2007 | Jimmy Bartel | |
| Brownlow Medal | 2009 | Gary Ablett Jr. | |
| Brownlow Medal | 2016 | Patrick Dangerfield | |
| Coleman Medal/ Leading Goalkicker Medal | 1897 | Eddy James (with Jack Leith) | |
| Coleman Medal/ Leading Goalkicker Medal | 1899 | Eddy James | |
| Coleman Medal/ Leading Goalkicker Medal | 1900 | Teddy Lockwood (with Albert Thurgood) | |
| Coleman Medal/ Leading Goalkicker Medal | 1910 | Percy Martini | |
| Coleman Medal/ Leading Goalkicker Medal | 1921 | Cliff Rankin | |
| Coleman Medal/ Leading Goalkicker Medal | 1925 | Lloyd Hagger | |
| Coleman Medal/ Leading Goalkicker Medal | 1932 | George Moloney | |
| Coleman Medal/ Leading Goalkicker Medal | 1948 | Lindsay White | |
| Coleman Medal/ Leading Goalkicker Medal | 1955 | Noel Rayson | |
| Coleman Medal/ Leading Goalkicker Medal | 1962 | Doug Wade | |
| Coleman Medal/ Leading Goalkicker Medal | 1967 | Doug Wade | |
| Coleman Medal/ Leading Goalkicker Medal | 1969 | Doug Wade | |
| Coleman Medal/ Leading Goalkicker Medal | 1976 | Larry Donohue | |
| Coleman Medal/ Leading Goalkicker Medal | 1993 | Gary Ablett Sr. | |
| Coleman Medal/ Leading Goalkicker Medal | 1994 | Gary Ablett Sr. | |
| Coleman Medal/ Leading Goalkicker Medal | 1995 | Gary Ablett Sr. | |
| Coleman Medal/ Leading Goalkicker Medal | 2020 | Tom Hawkins | |
| Coleman Medal/ Leading Goalkicker Medal | 2025 | Jeremy Cameron | |
| Gary Ayres Award (AFLCA best player during AFL finals series) | 2022 | Patrick Dangerfield | |
| Goal of the Year | 1980 | Michael Turner | |
| Goal of the Year | 1985 | Andrew Bews | |
| Goal of the Year | 1989 | Gary Ablett Sr. | |
| Jim Stynes Community Leadership Award | 2016 | Jimmy Bartel | |
| Jim Stynes Community Leadership Award | 2022 | Joel Selwood | |
| Jock McHale Medal/ Premiership Coach Medal | 1925 | Cliff Rankin | |
| Jock McHale Medal/ Premiership Coach Medal | 1931 | Charlie Clymo | |
| Jock McHale Medal/ Premiership Coach Medal | 1937 | Reg Hickey | |
| Jock McHale Medal/ Premiership Coach Medal | 1951 | Reg Hickey | |
| Jock McHale Medal/ Premiership Coach Medal | 1952 | Reg Hickey | |
| Jock McHale Medal/ Premiership Coach Medal | 1963 | Bob Davis | |
| Jock McHale Medal/ Premiership Coach Medal | 2007 | Mark Thompson | |
| Jock McHale Medal/ Premiership Coach Medal | 2009 | Mark Thompson | |
| Jock McHale Medal/ Premiership Coach Medal | 2011 | Chris Scott | |
| Jock McHale Medal/ Premiership Coach Medal | 2022 | Chris Scott | |
| Leigh Matthews Trophy (AFLPA Most Valuable Player) | 1985 | Greg Williams | |
| Leigh Matthews Trophy (AFLPA Most Valuable Player) | 1993 | Gary Ablett Sr. | |
| Leigh Matthews Trophy (AFLPA Most Valuable Player) | 2007 | Gary Ablett Jr. | |
| Leigh Matthews Trophy (AFLPA Most Valuable Player) | 2008 | Gary Ablett Jr. | |
| Leigh Matthews Trophy (AFLPA Most Valuable Player) | 2009 | Gary Ablett Jr. | |
| Leigh Matthews Trophy (AFLPA Most Valuable Player) | 2016 | Patrick Dangerfield | |
| Madden Medal | 2011 | Cameron Ling | |
| Mark of the Year | 1985 | Gary Ablett Sr. | |
| Mark of the Year | 1994 | Gary Ablett Sr. | |
| Mark of the Year | 2006 | Brad Ottens | |
| Michael Tuck Medal | 2009 | Joel Selwood | |
| Norm Smith Medal | 1989 | Gary Ablett Sr. | |
| Norm Smith Medal | 2007 | Steve Johnson | |
| Norm Smith Medal | 2009 | Paul Chapman | |
| Norm Smith Medal | 2011 | Jimmy Bartel | |
| Norm Smith Medal | 2022 | Isaac Smith | |
| Robert Rose Award (AFLPA Most Courageous Player) | 2009 | Joel Selwood | |
| Robert Rose Award (AFLPA Most Courageous Player) | 2012 | Joel Selwood (with Beau Waters of West Coast) | |
| Robert Rose Award (AFLPA Most Courageous Player) | 2013 | Joel Selwood | |
| Robert Rose Award (AFLPA Most Courageous Player) | 2014 | Joel Selwood | |

=== Other honours ===
| Honour | Year | Player | Ref. |
|---|---|---|---|
| AFL Team of the Century | 1996 | Gary Ablett Sr. | |
| AFL Team of the Century | 1996 | Graham Farmer | |
| AFL Team of the Century | 1996 | Bernie Smith | |
| AFL Team of the Century | 1996 | Greg Williams | |
| All-Australian team (State of origin era, 1953–1988) | 1953 | Bernie Smith | |
| All-Australian team (State of origin era, 1953–1988) | 1956 | Peter Pianto | |
| All-Australian team (State of origin era, 1953–1988) | 1958 | Bob Davis (captain) | |
| All-Australian team (State of origin era, 1953–1988) | 1966 | Denis Marshall | |
| All-Australian team (State of origin era, 1953–1988) | 1969 | John Newman | |
| All-Australian team (State of origin era, 1953–1988) | 1972 | David Clarke | |
| All-Australian team (State of origin era, 1953–1988) | 1979 | Gary Malarkey | |
| All-Australian team (State of origin era, 1953–1988) | 1979 | Michael Turner | |
| All-Australian team (State of origin era, 1953–1988) | 1980 | Ian Nankervis | |
| All-Australian team (State of origin era, 1953–1988) | 1987 | Mark Bairstow | |
| All-Australian team (State of origin era, 1953–1988) | 1987 | Andrew Bews | |
| All-Australian team (State of origin era, 1953–1988) | 1987 | Bruce Lindner | |
| All-Australian team (State of origin era, 1953–1988) | 1988 | Bruce Lindner | |
| All-Australian team (AFL era, 1991–present) | 1991 | Mark Bairstow | |
| All-Australian team (AFL era, 1991–present) | 1991 | Billy Brownless | |
| All-Australian team (AFL era, 1991–present) | 1991 | Paul Couch | |
| All-Australian team (AFL era, 1991–present) | 1991 | Garry Hocking | |
| All-Australian team (AFL era, 1991–present) | 1992 | Gary Ablett Sr. | |
| All-Australian team (AFL era, 1991–present) | 1992 | Mark Bairstow | |
| All-Australian team (AFL era, 1991–present) | 1992 | Barry Stoneham | |
| All-Australian team (AFL era, 1991–present) | 1993 | Gary Ablett Sr. | |
| All-Australian team (AFL era, 1991–present) | 1993 | Garry Hocking | |
| All-Australian team (AFL era, 1991–present) | 1994 | Gary Ablett Sr. | |
| All-Australian team (AFL era, 1991–present) | 1994 | Garry Hocking | |
| All-Australian team (AFL era, 1991–present) | 1994 | Michael Mansfield | |
| All-Australian team (AFL era, 1991–present) | 1995 | Gary Ablett Sr. (captain) | |
| All-Australian team (AFL era, 1991–present) | 1995 | Paul Couch | |
| All-Australian team (AFL era, 1991–present) | 1995 | Michael Mansfield | |
| All-Australian team (AFL era, 1991–present) | 1996 | Garry Hocking | |
| All-Australian team (AFL era, 1991–present) | 2000 | Steven King | |
| All-Australian team (AFL era, 1991–present) | 2003 | Matthew Scarlett | |
| All-Australian team (AFL era, 1991–present) | 2004 | Matthew Scarlett | |
| All-Australian team (AFL era, 1991–present) | 2007 | Gary Ablett Jr. | |
| All-Australian team (AFL era, 1991–present) | 2007 | Jimmy Bartel | |
| All-Australian team (AFL era, 1991–present) | 2007 | Joel Corey | |
| All-Australian team (AFL era, 1991–present) | 2007 | Matthew Egan | |
| All-Australian team (AFL era, 1991–present) | 2007 | Steve Johnson | |
| All-Australian team (AFL era, 1991–present) | 2007 | Cameron Ling | |
| All-Australian team (AFL era, 1991–present) | 2007 | Darren Milburn | |
| All-Australian team (AFL era, 1991–present) | 2007 | Cameron Mooney | |
| All-Australian team (AFL era, 1991–present) | 2007 | Matthew Scarlett | |
| All-Australian team (AFL era, 1991–present) | 2008 | Gary Ablett Jr. | |
| All-Australian team (AFL era, 1991–present) | 2008 | Jimmy Bartel | |
| All-Australian team (AFL era, 1991–present) | 2008 | Joel Corey | |
| All-Australian team (AFL era, 1991–present) | 2008 | Corey Enright | |
| All-Australian team (AFL era, 1991–present) | 2008 | Tom Harley (vice-captain) | |
| All-Australian team (AFL era, 1991–present) | 2008 | Steve Johnson | |
| All-Australian team (AFL era, 1991–present) | 2008 | Matthew Scarlett | |
| All-Australian team (AFL era, 1991–present) | 2009 | Gary Ablett Jr. | |
| All-Australian team (AFL era, 1991–present) | 2009 | Paul Chapman | |
| All-Australian team (AFL era, 1991–present) | 2009 | Corey Enright | |
| All-Australian team (AFL era, 1991–present) | 2009 | Joel Selwood | |
| All-Australian team (AFL era, 1991–present) | 2009 | Matthew Scarlett | |
| All-Australian team (AFL era, 1991–present) | 2010 | Gary Ablett Jr. (vice-captain) | |
| All-Australian team (AFL era, 1991–present) | 2010 | Paul Chapman | |
| All-Australian team (AFL era, 1991–present) | 2010 | Corey Enright | |
| All-Australian team (AFL era, 1991–present) | 2010 | Steve Johnson | |
| All-Australian team (AFL era, 1991–present) | 2010 | Joel Selwood | |
| All-Australian team (AFL era, 1991–present) | 2010 | Harry Taylor | |
| All-Australian team (AFL era, 1991–present) | 2011 | Corey Enright | |
| All-Australian team (AFL era, 1991–present) | 2011 | James Kelly | |
| All-Australian team (AFL era, 1991–present) | 2011 | Matthew Scarlett | |
| All-Australian team (AFL era, 1991–present) | 2012 | Tom Hawkins | |
| All-Australian team (AFL era, 1991–present) | 2013 | Corey Enright | |
| All-Australian team (AFL era, 1991–present) | 2013 | Andrew Mackie | |
| All-Australian team (AFL era, 1991–present) | 2013 | Joel Selwood (captain) | |
| All-Australian team (AFL era, 1991–present) | 2013 | Harry Taylor | |
| All-Australian team (AFL era, 1991–present) | 2014 | Joel Selwood (captain) | |
| All-Australian team (AFL era, 1991–present) | 2016 | Patrick Dangerfield | |
| All-Australian team (AFL era, 1991–present) | 2016 | Joel Selwood (captain) | |
| All-Australian team (AFL era, 1991–present) | 2017 | Patrick Dangerfield | |
| All-Australian team (AFL era, 1991–present) | 2017 | Joel Selwood | |
| All-Australian team (AFL era, 1991–present) | 2018 | Patrick Dangerfield | |
| All-Australian team (AFL era, 1991–present) | 2018 | Tom Stewart | |
| All-Australian team (AFL era, 1991–present) | 2019 | Patrick Dangerfield | |
| All-Australian team (AFL era, 1991–present) | 2019 | Tom Hawkins | |
| All-Australian team (AFL era, 1991–present) | 2019 | Tim Kelly | |
| All-Australian team (AFL era, 1991–present) | 2019 | Tom Stewart | |
| All-Australian team (AFL era, 1991–present) | 2020 | Patrick Dangerfield (captain) | |
| All-Australian team (AFL era, 1991–present) | 2020 | Cameron Guthrie | |
| All-Australian team (AFL era, 1991–present) | 2020 | Tom Hawkins | |
| All-Australian team (AFL era, 1991–present) | 2021 | Tom Hawkins | |
| All-Australian team (AFL era, 1991–present) | 2021 | Tom Stewart | |
| All-Australian team (AFL era, 1991–present) | 2022 | Mark Blicavs | |
| All-Australian team (AFL era, 1991–present) | 2022 | Jeremy Cameron | |
| All-Australian team (AFL era, 1991–present) | 2022 | Tom Hawkins (captain) | |
| All-Australian team (AFL era, 1991–present) | 2022 | Tyson Stengle | |
| All-Australian team (AFL era, 1991–present) | 2022 | Tom Stewart | |
| All-Australian team (AFL era, 1991–present) | 2023 | Tom Stewart | |
| All-Australian team (AFL era, 1991–present) | 2024 | Jeremy Cameron | |
| All-Australian team (AFL era, 1991–present) | 2025 | Jeremy Cameron (captain) | |
| All-Australian team (AFL era, 1991–present) | 2025 | Bailey Smith | |
| All-Australian team (AFL era, 1991–present) | 2026 | Oliver Dempsey | |
| All-Australian team (AFL era, 1991–present) | 2026 | Bailey Smith | |
| Australian Football Hall of Fame | 1996 | Peter Burns | |
| Australian Football Hall of Fame | 1996 | Bob Davis | |
| Australian Football Hall of Fame | 1996 | Graham Farmer (legend) | |
| Australian Football Hall of Fame | 1996 | Edward Greeves | |
| Australian Football Hall of Fame | 1996 | Tom Hafey (coach) | |
| Australian Football Hall of Fame | 1996 | Reg Hickey | |
| Australian Football Hall of Fame | 1996 | George Moloney | |
| Australian Football Hall of Fame | 1996 | Bernie Smith | |
| Australian Football Hall of Fame | 1996 | George 'Jocka' Todd | |
| Australian Football Hall of Fame | 1996 | Tom Wills (administrator) | |
| Australian Football Hall of Fame | 1996 | Doug Wade | |
| Australian Football Hall of Fame | 1996 | Henry Young | |
| Australian Football Hall of Fame | 1997 | Charles Brownlow (administrator) | |
| Australian Football Hall of Fame | 1998 | Fred Flanagan | |
| Australian Football Hall of Fame | 2000 | Bill Goggin | |
| Australian Football Hall of Fame | 2001 | Greg Williams | |
| Australian Football Hall of Fame | 2002 | John Newman | |
| Australian Football Hall of Fame | 2004 | Denis Marshall | |
| Australian Football Hall of Fame | 2005 | Gary Ablett Sr. | |
| Australian Football Hall of Fame | 2005 | Ian Nankervis | |
| Australian Football Hall of Fame | 2008 | Garry Hocking | |
| Australian Football Hall of Fame | 2013 | Brian Peake | |
| Australian Football Hall of Fame | 2018 | Matthew Scarlett | |
| Australian Football Hall of Fame | 2023 | Jimmy Bartel | |
| Australian Football Hall of Fame | 2023 | Corey Enright | |
| Australian Football Hall of Fame | 2026 | Gary Ablett Jr | |
| Australian Football Hall of Fame | 2026 | Tim Evans | |
| Indigenous Team of the Century | 2005 | Graham Farmer (captain) | |
| Italian Team of the Century | 2007 | Frank Costa (president) | |
| Italian Team of the Century | 2007 | Peter Pianto | |
| Italian Team of the Century | 2007 | Peter Riccardi | |
| International Rules (Australian representatives) | 2000 | Steven King | |
| International Rules (Australian representatives) | 2002 | Cameron Ling | |
| International Rules (Australian representatives) | 2002 | Matthew Scarlett | |
| International Rules (Australian representatives) | 2003 | Matthew Scarlett | |
| International Rules (Australian representatives) | 2004 | Joel Corey | |
| International Rules (Australian representatives) | 2005 | Darren Milburn | |
| International Rules (Australian representatives) | 2008 | Josh Hunt | |
| International Rules (Australian representatives) | 2008 | Max Rooke | |
| International Rules (Australian representatives) | 2010 | Travis Varcoe | |
| International Rules (Australian representatives) | 2010 | David Wojcinski | |
| International Rules (Australian representatives) | 2011 | James Kelly | |
| International Rules (Australian representatives) | 2013 | Allen Christensen | |
| International Rules (Australian representatives) | 2013 | Steven Motlop | |
| International Rules (Australian representatives) | 2013 | Mathew Stokes | |
| International Rules (Australian representatives) | 2013 | Travis Varcoe | |
| International Rules (Australian representatives) | 2014 | Steve Johnson | |
| International Rules (Australian representatives) | 2014 | Joel Selwood | |
| International Rules (Australian representatives) | 2014 | Harry Taylor | |
| International Rules (Australian representatives) | 2015 | Patrick Dangerfield | |
| International Rules (Australian representatives) | 2015 | Harry Taylor | |
| International Rules (Australian representatives) | 2017 | Patrick Dangerfield | |
| International Rules (Australian representatives) | 2017 | Joel Selwood (captain) | |
| International Rules (Australian representatives) | 2017 | Chris Scott (coach) | |
| Jim Stynes Medal | 2011 | James Kelly | |
| Jim Stynes Medal | 2015 | Harry Taylor | |
| Multicultural Team of Champions | 2013 | Matthew Scarlett (England) | |
| VFL/AFL Team of the Year (Awarded 1982–1990) | 1983 | Gary Malarkey | |
| VFL/AFL Team of the Year (Awarded 1982–1990) | 1984 | Gary Ablett Sr. | |
| VFL/AFL Team of the Year (Awarded 1982–1990) | 1986 | Gary Ablett Sr. | |
| VFL/AFL Team of the Year (Awarded 1982–1990) | 1987 | Mark Bairstow | |
| VFL/AFL Team of the Year (Awarded 1982–1990) | 1987 | Andrew Bews | |
| VFL/AFL Team of the Year (Awarded 1982–1990) | 1987 | Mark Bos | |
| VFL/AFL Team of the Year (Awarded 1982–1990) | 1989 | Gary Ablett Sr. | |
| VFL/AFL Team of the Year (Awarded 1982–1990) | 1989 | Mark Bairstow | |
| VFL/AFL Team of the Year (Awarded 1982–1990) | 1989 | Andrew Bews | |
| VFL/AFL Team of the Year (Awarded 1982–1990) | 1989 | Paul Couch | |
| VFL/AFL Team of the Year (Awarded 1982–1990) | 1989 | Barry Stoneham | |
| VFL/AFL Team of the Year (Awarded 1982–1990) | 1990 | Gary Ablett Sr. | |

=== Media awards ===
| Award | Year | Player | Ref. |
|---|---|---|---|
| The Age Footballer of the Year | 2007 | Gary Ablett Jr. | |
| The Age Footballer of the Year | 2016 | Patrick Dangerfield | |
| Herald Sun Player of the Year | 2007 | Gary Ablett Jr. | |
| Herald Sun Player of the Year | 2014 | Joel Selwood | |
| Herald Sun Player of the Year | 2016 | Patrick Dangerfield | |
| Lou Richards Medal | 2009 | Gary Ablett Jr. | |
| Lou Richards Medal | 2016 | Patrick Dangerfield | |

== AFL Women's ==
=== Awards ===
| Award | Year | Player | Ref. |
|---|---|---|---|
| AFL Women's Leading Goalkicker | 2024 | Aishling Moloney | |
| AFLPA Best First-Year Player | 2023 | Aishling Moloney | |
| Jim Stynes Community Leadership Award | 2025 | Kate Darby | |
| Mark of the Year | 2022 (S7) | Chloe Scheer | |

=== Other honours ===
| Honour | Year | Player | Ref. |
|---|---|---|---|
| AFL Women's All-Australian team | 2019 | Meg McDonald | |
| AFL Women's All-Australian team | 2020 | Olivia Purcell | |
| AFL Women's All-Australian team | 2021 | Meg McDonald | |
| AFL Women's All-Australian team | 2022 (S7) | Georgie Prespakis | |
| AFL Women's All-Australian team | 2022 (S7) | Chloe Scheer | |
| AFL Women's All-Australian team | 2022 (S7) | Amy McDonald | |
| AFL Women's All-Australian team | 2024 | Aishling Moloney | |
| AFL Women's All-Australian team | 2025 | Georgie Prespakis | |
| International representation (Australia) | 2026 | Georgie Prespakis | |
| International representation (Australia) | 2026 | Nina Morrison | |
| International representation (Ireland) | 2026 | Aishling Moloney | |
| International representation (Ireland) | 2026 | Rachel Kearns | |

== VFL Men's ==
=== Awards ===
| Award | Year | Player | Ref. |
|---|---|---|---|
| J. J. Liston Trophy | 2007 | James Byrne | |
| J. J. Liston Trophy | 2013 | Jordan Schroder | |
| J. J. Liston Trophy | 2026 | George Stevens | |
| Fothergill–Round–Mitchell Medal | 2006 | Jason Davenport | |
| Norm Goss Memorial Medal | 2002 | James Rahilly | |
| Norm Goss Memorial Medal | 2007 | Tom Lonergan | |
| Norm Goss Memorial Medal | 2012 | George Horlin-Smith | |

== VFL Women's ==
=== Awards ===
| Award | Year | Player | Ref. |
|---|---|---|---|
| Lambert–Pearce Medal | 2023 | Charlotte Simpson | |
| Debbie Lee Medal (VFL Women's Rising Star) | 2023 | Charlotte Simpson | |

== Club awards and honours ==
=== Other awards ===
| Season | Best Young Player (Note: Known as "Best first-year player" prior to 2011) | Coach's Award | Community Champion (Note: First awarded in 2003) | Tom Harley Award (Note: Awarded to the player that best demonstrates the values of the team and the club, on and off the field; known as "Best clubman" prior to 2011.) | Ref. |
|---|---|---|---|---|---|
| 1986 | Billy Brownless | Unknown | —N/a | Unknown | |
| 1993 | Unknown | Unknown | —N/a | Tim McGrath | |
| 1996 | Ronnie Burns | Unknown | —N/a | Unknown | |
| 1997 | Unknown | Unknown | —N/a | Tim McGrath | |
| 1998 | James Rahilly | David Mensch | —N/a | Unknown | |
| 1999 | Unknown | Unknown | —N/a | Unknown | |
| 2000 | David Spriggs | Unknown | —N/a | Unknown | |
| 2001 | Corey Enright | Tom Harley | —N/a | Tim McGrath | |
| 2002 | James Kelly | Matthew Scarlett | —N/a | Tom Harley | |
| 2003 | Matthew McCarthy | Corey Enright | Cameron Ling | James Rahilly | |
| 2004 | Kane Tenace | Cameron Mooney | Kent Kingsley | Peter Riccardi | |
| 2005 | Matthew Egan | Joel Corey | Kent Kingsley | Brenton Sanderson | |
| 2006 | Brent Prismall | Paul Chapman | Cameron Mooney | Tom Harley | |
| 2007 | Joel Selwood | Corey Enright | Tom Lonergan | Matthew Egan | |
| 2008 | Harry Taylor | Cameron Ling | James Kelly; Tom Harley; David Wojcinski | Tom Harley | |
| 2009 | Tom Gillies | Corey Enright | Mathew Stokes | Brad Ottens | |
| 2010 | James Podsiadly | James Kelly | Nathan Djerrkura; Travis Varcoe | Tom Lonergan | |
| 2011 | Daniel Menzel | Cameron Mooney | Joel Selwood | Cameron Mooney; Joel Selwood | |
| 2012 | Steven Motlop | Matthew Scarlett | Harry Taylor | Shannon Byrnes | |
| 2013 | Mark Blicavs | Steven Motlop | Mathew Stokes | Andrew Mackie; Joel Selwood | |
| 2014 | Cameron Guthrie | Joel Selwood | Mathew Stokes | Corey Enright | |
| 2015 | Darcy Lang | Steve Johnson | Corey Enright | Andrew Mackie | |
| 2016 | Jake Kolodjashnij | —N/a | Daniel Menzel | Harry Taylor | |
| 2017 | Tom Stewart | —N/a | Scott Selwood | Scott Selwood | |
| 2018 | Jack Henry | —N/a | Jamaine Jones | George Horlin-Smith | |
| 2019 | Gryan Miers | —N/a | Tom Hawkins | Scott Selwood | |
| 2020 | Bradley Close | —N/a | Joel Selwood | Mark Blicavs; Harry Taylor | |
| 2021 | Max Holmes | —N/a | Esava Ratugolea | Tom Hawkins | |
| 2022 | Sam De Koning | —N/a | Joel Selwood | Tom Atkins | |
| 2023 | Oliver Henry | —N/a | Tom Stewart | Tom Atkins | |
| 2024 | Oliver Dempsey | —N/a | Tom Hawkins | Tom Atkins; Tom Hawkins | |
| 2025 | Connor O'Sullivan | —N/a | Shaun Mannagh | Tom Atkins; Mark Blicavs | |
| 2026 | Mitchell Edwards | —N/a | Shaun Mannagh | Mark Blicavs | |

==== VFL best and fairest ====
| Season | Player | Ref. |
|---|---|---|
| 2000 | Paul Lindsay | |
| 2001 | Paul Corrigan | |
| 2001 | David Mensch | |
| 2003 | Andrew Carrazzo | |
| 2004 | James Byrne | |
| 2005 | Matthew Spencer | |
| 2006 | James Byrne | |
| 2007 | Tim Callan | |
| 2008 | Jason Davenport | |
| 2009 | James Podsiadly | |
| 2010 | Ryan Gamble | |
| 2011 | Jonathan Simpkin | |
| 2012 | Jonathan Simpkin | |
| 2013 | Mark Corrigan | |
| 2014 | Jordan Schroder | |
| 2015 | Tom Ruggles | |
| 2016 | Tom Atkins | |
| 2017 | James Tsitas | |
| 2018 | Tom Atkins | |
| 2019 | Sam Simpson | |
| 2020 | Not awarded | |
| 2021 | Darcy Fort | |
| 2022 | Jye Chalcraft | |
| 2023 | Jye Chalcraft | |
| 2024 | Mitch Hardie | |
| 2025 | Marcus Herbert | |
| 2026 | George Stevens | |

==== VFL Women's best and fairest ====
| Season | Player | Ref. |
|---|---|---|
| 2017 | Lily Mithen | |
| 2018 | Richelle Cranston | |
| 2019 | Rebecca Webster | |
| 2020 | Not awarded | |
| 2021 | Claudia Gunjaca | |
| 2022 | Paige Sheppard | |
| 2023 | Charlotte Simpson | |
| 2024 | Lily Jordan | |
| 2025 | Hayley Peck | |
| 2026 | Lucy Marescuk | |

=== Geelong's Team of the Century ===
Team of the Century
| Backs | Bernie Smith | George Todd | John 'Sam' Newman |
| Half backs | Dick Grigg | Reg Hickey | Joe Slater |
| Centres | Michael Turner | Edward 'Carji' Greeves | Leo Turner |
| Half forwards | Gary Ablett Sr. | Fred Flanagan | Bob Davis |
| Forwards | Henry Young | Doug Wade | Peter Pianto |
| Followers | Graham 'Polly' Farmer | Garry Hocking | Bill Goggin |
| Interchange | David Clarke | Paul Couch | Alec Eason | Les Hardiman |
| Emergencies | Ian Nankervis | Jack Collins | Tommy Quinn | Cliff Rankin |

=== Hall of Fame ===
The Geelong Football Club Hall of Fame reflects the contributions of players and coaches who have made significant contributions to the club across their respective careers. The club inducts individuals into the Hall of Fame on a case-by-case basis, and although there is no provision for automatic inclusion, the individual needs to satisfy a selection of criteria to be considered for induction. Consideration will only be given once the player or coach has been retired for a minimum of three years, and individuals who have both played and coached for Geelong may have their records combined for consideration.

Players generally need to meet a minimum of four of the following ten criteria to be considered for inclusion:

1. Ten years’ service as a VFL/AFL player (including on the rookie list)
2. Played 200 senior matches (does not include pre-season, night series or representative matches)
3. Club captain for at least two years
4. Winner of the Carji Greeves Medal
5. Placed in top-three for Carji Greeves Medal on at least four occasions (applies from 1960 onwards)
6. Premiership player (with each premiership counting as one guideline being met)
7. Selected for All-Australian team
8. Winner of the Brownlow Medal or Champion of the Colony
9. Placed in top-three for Brownlow Medal on at least two occasions
10. Winner of the Coleman Medal or competition's leading goalkicker award

Coaches generally need to meet the following three criteria to be considered for inclusion:

1. Six years’ service as the VFL/AFL senior coach
2. Premiership coach (with each premiership counting as one guideline being met)
3. Qualified for the VFL/AFL finals series on at least five occasions as senior coach

==== Inductees ====
- Gary Ablett Jr.
- Gary Ablett Sr.
- Tom Arklay
- Les Armstrong
- Mark Bairstow
- Jimmy Bartel
- Andrew Bews
- Rod Blake
- Mark Bos
- Terry Bright
- Billy Brownless
- Charles Brownlow
- Neville Bruns
- Peter Burns
- Paul Chapman
- David E. Clarke
- Wayne Closter
- Arthur Coghlan
- Jack L. Collins
- Joel Corey
- Frank Costa
- Paul Couch
- Tim Darcy
- Bob Davis
- John Devine
- Percy Douglass
- Alec Eason
- Bill Eason
- Corey Enright
- Jack L. Evans
- Graham Farmer
- Fred Flanagan
- Bill Goggin
- Ben Graham
- Edward Greeves
- Dick Grigg
- Lloyd Hagger
- William (Ben) "Trusty" Hall
- Les Hardiman
- Peter Hardiman
- Tom Harley
- Fred Hawking
- Jack Hawkins
- Reg Hickey
- David Hickinbotham
- Ken Hinkley
- Garry Hocking
- Steve Hocking
- Ron Hovey
- Josh Hunt
- John Hyde
- Steve Johnson
- James Kelly
- Steven King
- Cameron Ling
- Tom Lonergan
- Alistair Lord
- Andrew Mackie
- Gary Malarkey
- Michael Mansfield
- Denis Marshall
- Harry Marsham
- Percy Martini
- Billy McCarter
- Tim McGrath
- Hughie McLean
- Phil "Shilley" McShane
- Joe McShane
- David Mensch
- Darren Milburn
- George M. Moloney
- Cam Mooney
- Bruce Morrison
- Angie Muller
- Bruce Nankervis
- Ian J. Nankervis
- Robert Neal
- Ken Newland
- Ernest Newling
- John Newman
- John O'Neill
- Brad Ottens
- Peter Pianto
- Alex Popescu
- Tommy Quinn
- Bert Rankin
- Cliff Rankin
- Teddy Rankin
- Russell Renfrey
- Peter Riccardi
- Max Rooke
- Bill R. Ryan
- Brenton Sanderson
- John Scarlett
- Matthew Scarlett
- Chris Scott
- Joe Sellwood
- Joel Selwood
- Brad Sholl
- Joe Slater
- Bernie Smith
- Mathew Stokes
- Barry Stoneham
- Harry Taylor
- Mark Thompson
- George Todd
- Neil Trezise
- Leo Turner
- Michael Turner
- Travis Varcoe
- Doug Wade
- Peter Walker
- Roy West
- Lindsay White
- Geoff Williams
- Tom Wills
- Jack Williams
- Jimmy Wilson Jnr
- David Wojcinski
- Fred Wooller
- Mark Yeates
- Henry Young

=== Life membership ===
Whilst the club may award life membership to any person who has dedicated outstanding service to the Geelong Football Club, players automatically qualify for life membership once they achieve any of the following criteria for the club:

- Inducted into the Geelong Football Club Hall of Fame
- Played 150 senior games
- Played 100 senior games, and is a premiership player
- Played 50 senior games, a premiership player and at least one of the following:
  - Brownlow Medal winner
  - Carji Greeves Medal winner
  - Selected in All-Australian team or (prior to 1990) Victorian team
  - Inducted in Australian Football Hall of Fame
  - Geelong Football Club captain
  - Winner of the Coleman Medal or competition's leading goalkicker award
  - Ten years’ service as a VFL/AFL player
  - Played in an additional premiership team

== Club records ==
=== V/AFL team ===
| ^ | Denotes current player |

==== Most club games ====
Most club games for Geelong (minimum 200 games)
| Player | Career span | Games |
|---|---|---|
| Tom Hawkins | 2007–2024 | 359 |
| Joel Selwood | 2007–2022 | 355 |
| Corey Enright | 2001–2016 | 332 |
| Ian Nankervis | 1967–1983 | 325 |
| Mark Blicavs^ | 2013–present | 313 |
| Jimmy Bartel | 2002–2016 | 305 |
| Mitch Duncan | 2010–2025 | 305 |
| Sam Newman | 1964–1980 | 300 |
| Darren Milburn | 1997–2011 | 292 |
| Peter Riccardi | 1992–2006 | 288 |
| Matthew Scarlett | 1998–2012 | 284 |
| Andrew Mackie | 2004–2017 | 280 |
| Harry Taylor | 2008–2020 | 280 |
| Joel Corey | 2000–2013 | 276 |
| Garry Hocking | 1987–2001 | 274 |
| James Kelly | 2002–2015 | 273 |
| Paul Couch | 1985–1997 | 259 |
| Bruce Nankervis | 1970–1983 | 253 |
| Steve Johnson | 2001–2015 | 253 |
| Paul Chapman | 2000–2013 | 251 |
| Bill Goggin | 1958–1971 | 248 |
| Gary Ablett Jr. | 2002–2010, 2018–2020 | 247 |
| Cameron Ling | 2000–2011 | 246 |
| Reg Hickey | 1926–1940 | 245 |
| Michael Turner | 1974–1988 | 245 |
| Gary Ablett, Sr. | 1984–1996 | 242 |
| Barry Stoneham | 1986–2000 | 241 |
| Cameron Guthrie | 2011–2024 | 240 |
| George 'Jocka' Todd | 1922–1934 | 232 |
| Neville Bruns | 1978–1992 | 223 |
| Patrick Dangerfield^ | 2016–present | 223 |
| Bill Eason | 1902–1915 | 220 |
| Terry Bright | 1976–1987 | 219 |
| Tim McGrath | 1992–2002 | 219 |
| Ben Graham | 1993–2004 | 219 |
| Tom Stewart^ | 2017–present | 212 |
| Cameron Mooney | 2000–2011 | 210 |
| Tom Lonergan | 2005–2017 | 209 |
| Jake Kolodjashnij^ | 2015–present | 209 |
| Doug Wade | 1961–1972 | 208 |
| Andrew Bews | 1982–1993 | 207 |
| David Wojcinski | 1999–2012 | 203 |
| David Clarke | 1971–1981 | 202 |
| Russell Renfrey | 1946–1956 | 201 |
| Robert Neal | 1974–1986 | 200 |

==== Most club goals ====
Most club goals for Geelong (minimum 300 goals)
| Player | Career span | Goals | Games | Goals per game |
|---|---|---|---|---|
| Gary Ablett Sr. | 1984–1996 | 1021 | 242 | 4.22 |
| Doug Wade | 1961–1972 | 834 | 208 | 4.01 |
| Tom Hawkins | 2007–2024 | 796 | 359 | 2.22 |
| Steve Johnson | 2002–2015 | 452 | 253 | 1.79 |
| Billy Brownless | 1986–1997 | 441 | 198 | 2.23 |
| Lindsay White | 1941, 1944–1950 | 429 | 117 | 3.67 |
| Cliff Rankin | 1915, 1919–1928 | 400 | 153 | 2.61 |
| Lloyd Hagger | 1917–1927, 1929 | 389 | 174 | 2.24 |
| Jeremy Cameron^ | 2021–present | 348 | 126 | 2.76 |
| Larry Donohue | 1973–1980 | 339 | 105 | 3.29 |
| Paul Chapman | 2000–2013 | 336 | 251 | 1.34 |
| Percy Martini | 1909–1915, 1917–1920 | 333 | 148 | 2.25 |
| Terry Bright | 1976–1987 | 331 | 219 | 1.51 |
| Gary Ablett Jr. | 2002–2010, 2018–2020 | 321 | 247 | 1.30 |
| George Moloney | 1931–1935 | 303 | 88 | 3.44 |

==== Most goals in a game ====
Most goals in a single game by a Geelong player (minimum 12 goals)
| Player | Goals | Opponent | Venue | Season |
|---|---|---|---|---|
| Gary Ablett, Sr. | 14 | Sydney | SCG | 1994 |
| Gary Ablett, Sr. | 14 | Essendon | MCG | 1993 |
| Gary Ablett, Sr. | 14 | Richmond | MCG | 1989 |
| Doug Wade | 13 | North Melbourne | Kardinia Park | 1971 |
| Doug Wade | 13 | South Melbourne | Lake Oval | 1967 |
| Gary Ablett, Sr. | 12 | Richmond | Kardinia Park | 1993 |
| Gary Ablett, Sr. | 12 | Richmond | MCG | 1990 |
| George Moloney | 12 | St Kilda | Corio Oval | 1931 |

=== AFL Women's team ===
==== Most club games ====
As at round 10 of the 2026 AFL Women's season

| ^ | Denotes current player |

Most club games for Geelong (minimum 50 games)
| Player | Career span | Games |
|---|---|---|
| Rebecca Webster^ | 2019–present | 83 |
| Julia Crockett-Grills^ | 2019–present | 82 |
| Amy McDonald^ | 2019–present | 74 |
| Meg McDonald | 2019–2025 | 72 |
| Nina Morrison^ | 2019–present | 72 |
| Georgie Rankin^ | 2019–present | 66 |
| Georgie Prespakis^ | 2022 (S6)–present | 63 |
| Claudia Gunjaca^ | 2022 (S6)–present | 59 |
| Kate Darby | 2019–2025 | 57 |
| Mikayla Bowen^ | 2022 (S7)–present | 57 |
| Jacqueline Parry^ | 2022 (S7)–present | 57 |
| Zali Friswell^ | 2022 (S6)–present | 56 |
| Rachel Kearns^ | 2022 (S6)–present | 56 |
| Chantal Emonson^ | 2022 (S6)–present | 55 |

==== Most club goals ====
As at round 10 of the 2026 AFL Women's season

Most club goals for Geelong (minimum 30 goals)
| Player | Career span | Goals | Games | Goals per game |
|---|---|---|---|---|
| Aishling Moloney^ | 2023–present | 64 | 46 | 1.39 |
| Jacqueline Parry^ | 2022 (S7)–present | 63 | 57 | 1.11 |
| Chloe Scheer^ | 2022–present | 60 | 42 | 1.43 |

==== Most goals in a game ====
Most goals in a single game by a Geelong player (minimum 5 goals)
| Player | Goals | Opponent | Venue | Season |
|---|---|---|---|---|
| Aishling Moloney^ | 6 | West Coast | Mineral Resources Park | 2024 |
| Jacqueline Parry^ | 6 | St Kilda | GMHBA Stadium | 2026 |
| Chloe Scheer^ | 5 | Sydney | North Sydney Oval | 2023 |
