= Matthew Scarlett =

Australian rules footballer, born 1979

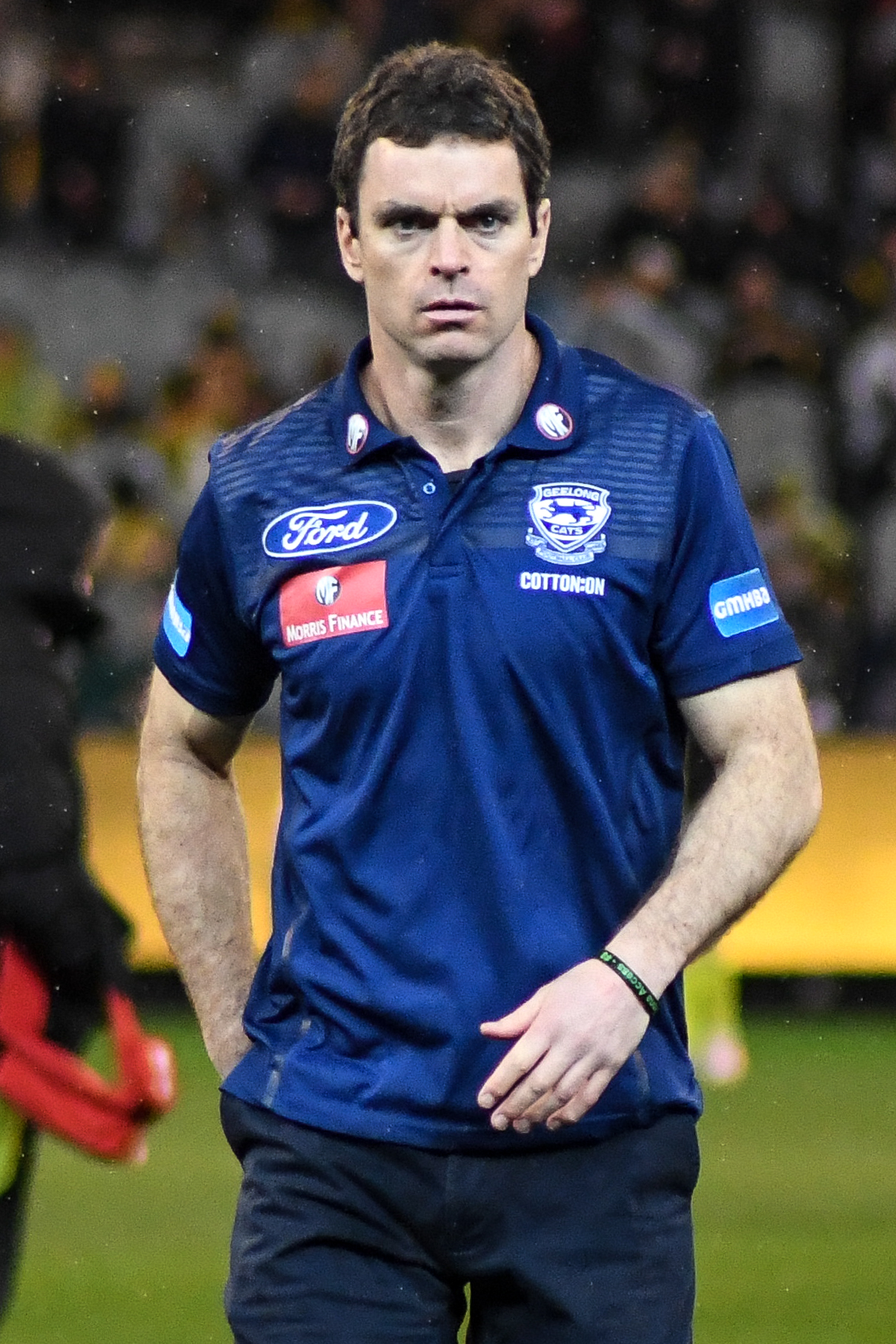
- Scarlett with Geelong in August 2018

Personal information
- Full name: Matthew Scarlett
- Nicknames: Scarlo, Gunner's boy, Lowndesy
- Born: 5 June 1979 (age 47); Geelong, Victoria
- Original team: Geelong Falcons/St Joseph’s Football Club
- Draft: 45th overall (father/son), 1997; Geelong
- Height: 194 cm (6 ft 4 in)
- Weight: 94 kg (207 lb)
- Position: Fullback

Playing career^{1}
Years	Club	Games (Goals)
1998–2012	Geelong	284 (17)

Representative team honours^{2}
Years	Team	Games (Goals)
2008	Victoria	1 (0)

International team honours^{2}
2002–2003	Australia	4 (0)
- ^{1} Playing statistics correct to the end of 2012.^{2} Representative statistics correct as of 2008.

Career highlights
- 3× Geelong premiership player (2007, 2009, 2011); 6× All-Australian team (2003, 2004, 2007, 2008, 2009, 2011); Carji Greeves Medal (2003); Australian Football Hall of Fame; St Joseph's College Team of Champions

Matthew Scarlett (born 5 June 1979) is a former Australian rules footballer, who formerly played for the Geelong Football Club in the Australian Football League (AFL). A fullback, who is 1.92 metres (6 ft 4 in) tall and weighing 94 kilograms (207 lb), Scarlett is the eldest son of former Geelong footballer John Scarlett.

Scarlett was selected by Geelong with the 45th overall pick in the 1997 AFL draft under the father–son rule, and made his senior debut for the club in the final round of the 1998 AFL season. Scarlett played predominantly as a fullback, and has garnered a long list of individual accolades. He is a triple premiership player from Geelong's premiership-winning teams of 2007, 2009 and 2011, has won a Carji Greeves Medal and been selected to six All-Australian sides, the most selections for a Geelong player. As well as this, Scarlett has been inducted into the Geelong Football Club Hall of Fame, represented the Victorian state team in the AFL Hall of Fame Tribute Match and represented Australia in International rules football.

Scarlett is currently serving as a development coach with the Geelong Football Club.

== Early life ==
Matthew Scarlett grew up in Geelong, Victoria, the son of former Geelong Football Club player John Scarlett. Despite this, Scarlett supported Essendon as a child, citing Michael Long and Matthew Lloyd as his favourite players. He was educated at St Joseph's College—the same school as his father—where he played junior football alongside future Geelong teammate Cameron Ling. Scarlett entered the next phase of his junior career when he was selected to play for the Geelong Falcons in the under 18 TAC Cup competition in 1997. His achievements with the Falcons were recognised when he was chosen to play for the Victorian Country representative side at the AFL Under 18 Championships, as well as being selected in the full-back position of the TAC Cup's Team of the Year.

== AFL career ==
=== 1998–1999: Debut and early career ===
Scarlett was drafted by the Geelong Football Club under the father–son rule with their fourth selection in the 1997 AFL draft, and was the forty-fifth overall draft pick. He was the club's second father–son recruit of the draft, with Marc Woolnough chosen with the club's second selection. In analysing his drafting, media reports identified Scarlett's strong marking and kicking skills whilst noting his potential as a key defender.

Despite playing in the league's pre-season competition as a back pocket, Scarlett did not make his senior-level debut until the final round of the 1998 AFL season where he was matched up against Essendon full-forward Matthew Lloyd. Geelong won this game by ten points, and although Scarlett himself garnered a respectable six disposals and took two marks, he allowed Lloyd to score six goals – a third of the team's total.

Scarlett did not play again until midway through the following season where he was once again matched against Lloyd. Scarlett later credited these match-ups with Lloyd as assisting his long-term development as a player – acknowledging that it was a challenging start to his career. He made a further four senior appearances during the season, including scoring his first goal in round 17. However the majority of the year was spent playing with the reserves team, where he placed third in the best and fairest.

=== 2000–2002: Establishment in the side ===
Following his limited playing opportunities in his first two seasons, Scarlett established himself in the senior side during the 2000 AFL season, playing in 21 games. This included his finals debut in Geelong's elimination final against Hawthorn, in which they were ultimately defeated by nine points. This capped off a breakthrough season for Scarlett, scoring two goals, achieving his first match in which he gathered at least ten possessions, and earning an AFL Rising Star nomination. Scarlett played a further 20 games and scored another two goals in 2001, a season in which had three games with 20 or more disposals. He was rewarded for his efforts by finishing runner-up in the club's best and fairest award, the Carji Greeves Medal. Scarlett celebrated his 50th game in the third round of the 2002 season with a victory over Kangaroos. He was awarded his first Brownlow Medal votes after achieving 26 possessions in a match against Port Adelaide in round eight. At the conclusion of the season, Scarlett was awarded the club's coach's award, and selected to represent Australia in an International rules football series against Ireland.

=== 2003–2004: Carji Greeves Medal and dual All-Australian selection ===
Scarlett played in every game for the second successive season in 2003, and had a career-high of 15 marks in round 16 against the Western Bulldogs. His consistent high number of marks was reflected when, at season's end, he was ranked 14th in the league for total marks, having obtained 134 marks throughout the 2003 season. Scarlett's performances throughout the season were recognised when he was awarded the club's best and fairest award, the Carji Greeves Medal, as well as achieving All-Australian honours for the first time in his career, and again representing Australia in International rules football.

Following another season without participation in the finals series, Scarlett and his teammates began their 2004 campaign with an appearance in the pre-season competition final against St Kilda. During the home-and-away period, Scarlett helped the Cats compile a 15–7 win–loss record to qualify for their first finals series in four years. Geelong progressed to the preliminary finals, before losing to Brisbane for a spot in the 2004 AFL Grand Final. Scarlett made twenty-five appearances in total over the course of the season, participating in every match. His high participation rate was realised when he spent all but three minutes in total of the season's matches on the field. Scarlett shared his 100th match with fellow Geelong defender Tom Harley in a 23-point victory over Essendon in the ninth round of the season. He once again finished the year ranked high within the league for total marks (132), placing equal eleventh. He gathered further individual accolades, finishing runner-up in club best and fairest voting, as well as earning an All-Australian selection for the second-consecutive season.

=== 2005–2006: 100th consecutive match and NAB Cup win ===
The following year, Geelong again qualified for the finals series after finishing the home-and-away campaign with a 12–10 win–loss record. They progressed through to the semi-finals, before a three-point loss to the Sydney Swans ended their season. Scarlett's consistency, reflected with his appearance in twenty-five games during the year and ranking equal twelfth for total marks within the league (146), was rewarded with a runner-up finishing in the club best and fairest award. Scarlett's consistent appearance within the Geelong side was recognised when he played in his 100th-consecutive game for the club in round 16.

After consecutive appearances in the finals series, Scarlett and Geelong were expected to challenge for the premiership once again in 2006. The club's 2006 campaign began successfully when, captained by Scarlett, they captured the pre-season NAB Cup, winning their first pre-season premiership since 1961. During the season, Scarlett's streak of four consecutive seasons of featuring in every Geelong match was broken following a two-game hiatus in the second and third rounds. Despite this, Scarlett played in 20 of 22 games for the season, including his 150th senior appearance for the club. He had a career-best 34 possessions in round 16, which was a one-point win over the Western Bulldogs, and garnered 13 or more possessions in 17 of his games. However, the Cats only managed to win 10 games throughout the season and missed qualification for the finals series. Scarlett finished the season unusually, playing as a forward in the final two matches, managing three goals for a season-total of four.

=== 2007–2012: Premiership success and retirement ===
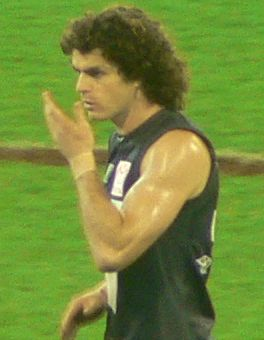
Scarlett representing Victoria in 2008.

Scarlett helped the Cats finish the home-and-away campaign first on the ladder to win the McClelland Trophy. Geelong progressed through to the 2007 AFL Grand Final, where they defeated Port Adelaide by a record 119 points to capture their first premiership since 1963.

Scarlett played in 24 games for the year and gathered a range of individual accolades. After earning his first premiership medal in the Grand Final victory, where he placed third in the Norm Smith Medal voting after gathering 29 possessions and scoring two behinds, Scarlett also achieved All-Australian honours for the third time in his career. Scarlett also had at least 10 disposals in every match for the season, with nine of these totals above 20. As well as the premiership victory, Scarlett also celebrated his 100th win for the club, which came in Geelong's qualifying final victory over the Kangaroos.

Scarlett helped the Cats achieve a record-equalling 21-win season and secure the McClelland Trophy for the second successive year in 2008. His standout season was recognised early on when he was selected to play for Victoria in the AFL Hall of Fame Tribute Match, and was later selected to his fourth All-Australian team, again as fullback. Scarlett made his 200th senior appearance for the club in round eighteen against Richmond, surpassing his father's total of 183 games for the club. He also set a career-best total of 14 handpasses in round 16 against the Western Bulldogs, finishing with 32 possessions. Despite having eight games with a minimum of 20 disposals, Scarlett failed to kick a goal for the first time since 2003. Having qualified for the finals series in first position on the ladder, Geelong progressed through to the Grand Final for the second successive season. Despite losing only one game during the home-and-away period, Geelong failed to capture the premiership as they were defeated by Hawthorn in the deciding game for the season. Scarlett performed consistently, but failed to have a massive impact in the final, gathering 11 disposals and one mark, as well as laying two tackles. However, he did limit Coleman Medallist Lance Franklin to only two goals for the match.

During the 2009 season, Scarlett was placed on Geelong's veteran-list, where half his salary would come outside of the club's salary cap. Scarlett was vital in Geelong's 2009 Grand Final triumph where he produced some magic play with less than five minutes to go, kicking the stationary ball off the ground from the centre square and setting up the match and premiership-winning goal by Paul Chapman. Scarlett was also involved in Geelong's 2011 Grand Final victory over Collingwood, making him one of the twelve Geelong players to participate in all three premierships of the era. Scarlett retired after Geelong's 2012 season ended with an elimination final loss to Fremantle.

== Post-retirement ==
Following his retirement at the end of 2012, Scarlett joined the Western Bulldogs as a part-time development coach specialising in the development of defenders. He was joined on the coaching team by former teammates Cameron Mooney and Steven King, as well as being reunited with Brendan McCartney, who was an assistant coach for Geelong from 2000 to 2010. Scarlett additionally signed a deal to play in the Geelong Football League for South Barwon in 2013.

In 2016, Scarlett joined the Geelong Cats as an assistant coach. He resigned from the role at the end of the 2021 season.

In 2020 he was named in the St Joseph’s College team of champions, recognising the best VFL/AFL players to have attended the school.

Scarlett joined the Melbourne Football Club as a part-time specialist coach in 2026, reuniting with former teammate and newly appointed coach, Steven King.

== Statistics ==
Legend
G	Goals	K	Kicks	D	Disposals	T	Tackles
B	Behinds	H	Handballs	M	Marks

Season	Team	No.	Games	Totals							Averages (per game)						
Season	Team	No.	Games	G	B	K	H	D	M	T	G	B	K	H	D	M	T
1998	Geelong	41	1	0	0	5	1	6	2	1	0.0	0.0	5.0	1.0	6.0	2.0	1.0
1999	Geelong	30	5	1	1	15	2	17	9	3	0.2	0.2	3.0	0.4	3.4	1.8	0.6
2000	Geelong	30	21	2	0	142	43	185	73	22	0.1	0.0	6.8	2.0	8.8	3.5	1.0
2001	Geelong	30	20	2	2	189	87	276	112	33	0.1	0.1	9.4	4.4	13.8	5.6	1.6
2002	Geelong	30	22	2	3	171	106	277	85	27	0.1	0.1	7.8	4.8	12.6	3.9	1.2
2003	Geelong	30	22	0	2	206	105	311	134	29	0.0	0.1	9.4	4.8	14.1	6.1	1.3
2004	Geelong	30	25	3	3	238	96	334	132	42	0.1	0.1	9.5	3.8	13.4	5.3	1.7
2005	Geelong	30	24	1	2	251	111	362	146	40	0.0	0.1	10.5	4.6	15.1	6.1	1.7
2006	Geelong	30	20	4	2	237	87	324	109	22	0.2	0.1	11.8	4.4	16.2	5.4	1.1
2007	Geelong	30	24	1	5	278	137	415	111	40	0.0	0.2	11.6	5.7	17.3	4.6	1.7
2008	Geelong	30	22	0	1	200	168	368	75	32	0.0	0.0	9.1	7.6	16.7	3.4	1.4
2009	Geelong	30	22	0	1	233	174	407	125	32	0.0	0.0	10.6	7.9	18.5	5.7	1.4
2010	Geelong	30	18	0	0	166	151	317	97	30	0.0	0.0	9.2	8.4	17.6	5.4	1.7
2011	Geelong	30	22	1	1	211	154	365	115	44	0.0	0.0	9.6	7.0	16.6	5.2	2.0
2012	Geelong	30	16	0	0	169	75	244	89	40	0.0	0.0	10.6	4.7	15.2	5.6	2.5
Career			284	17	23	2711	1497	4208	1414	437	0.1	0.1	9.5	5.3	14.8	5.0	1.5

== Honours and achievements ==
Brownlow Medal votes
Season	Votes
1998	—
1999	—
2000	—
2001	—
2002	2
2003	5
2004	5
2005	6
2006	2
2007	3
2008	2
2009	3
2010	—
2011	3
2012	—
Total	31

- Team
  - AFL Premiership (Geelong): 2007, 2009, 2011
  - McClelland Trophy (Geelong): 2007, 2008
  - NAB Cup (Geelong): 2006 (Captain), 2009

- Individual
  - All-Australian: 2003, 2004, 2007, 2008, 2009, 2011
  - Carji Greeves Medal: 2003
  - Leigh Matthews Trophy nominee: 2003, 2004, 2005, 2007
  - Australian representative honours in International rules football: 2002, 2003
  - Geelong F.C. Hall of Fame Inductee: 2006
  - Geelong F.C. Life Membership Inductee: 2006
  - Geelong F.C. Coach's Award: 2000
  - Victorian Representative Honours in AFL Hall of Fame Tribute Match: 2008
  - AFL Rising Star Award Nominee: 2000
  - Victorian Country Representative Honours at the AFL Under 18 Championships: 1997
  - Named in the TAC Cup Team of the Year: 1997 (Full-Back)

== Personal life ==
Scarlett married his longtime partner Milla Warren in October 2007, which capped off his premiership-winning year and the addition of the couple's first child, a daughter Charlie, to the family in May. Scarlett also has another daughter from a previous relationship with Jodie Nankervis, the daughter of former Geelong player Bruce Nankervis, and is eight years older than Charlie. Scarlett and his family currently reside in the coastal town of Jan Juc, Victoria.

Scarlett co-owned a Geelong-based restaurant with fellow Geelong footballers Steven King and Kent Kingsley called the George and Dragon Hotel from 2004–2007 until it changed name and ownership due to financial difficulty. Due to the financial difficulty being made known to Scarlett only days before its closure, he headbutted one of his fellow restaurant partners (although it was not said which), although he apologised the next day.

== See also ==
- List of Australian rules football families
- List of Geelong Football Club individual awards and records
