= Tom Atkins (footballer) =

Australian rules footballer (born 1995)

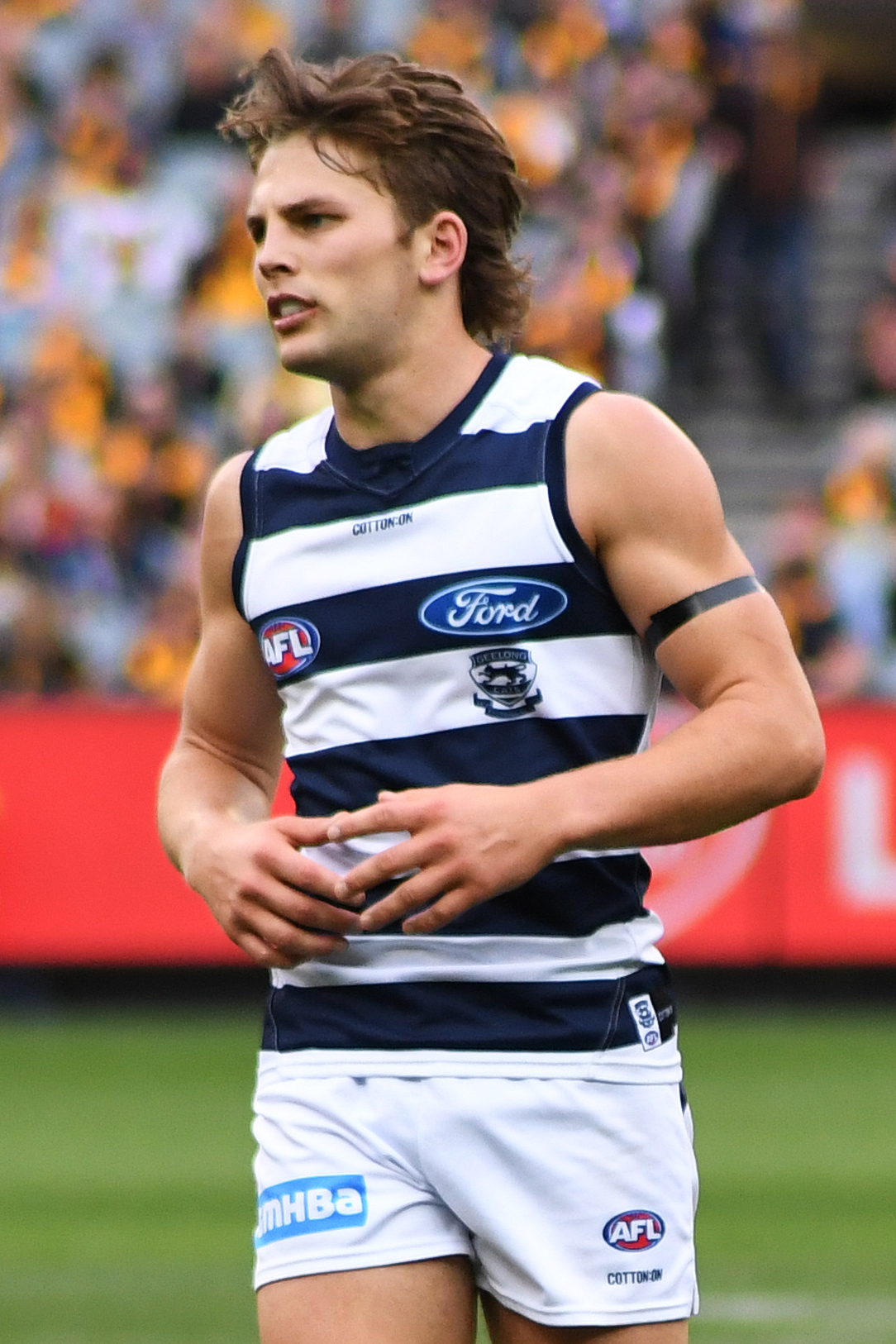
- Atkins playing for Geelong in April 2019

Personal information
- Born: 18 September 1995 (age 31)
- Original team: Geelong (VFL)/St Joseph's
- Draft: No. 11, 2019 rookie draft
- Debut: Round 1, 2019, Geelong vs. Collingwood, at the MCG
- Height: 180 cm (5 ft 11 in)
- Weight: 86 kg (190 lb)
- Position: Midfielder

Club information
- Current club: Geelong
- Number: 30

Playing career^{1}
Years	Club	Games (Goals)
2019–	Geelong	178 (26)
- ^{1} Playing statistics correct to the end of 2026.

Career highlights
- AFL Premiership Player: 2022; 4x Geelong Best Clubman award: 2022, 2023, 2024, 2025

Tom Atkins (born 18 September 1995) is an Australian rules footballer playing for Geelong in the Australian Football League (AFL). An inside midfielder with goalkicking ability, he spent his early career with Geelong's Victorian Football League (VFL) affiliate. After being overlooked in two AFL drafts, he was selected by Geelong with pick 11 in the 2019 rookie draft and made his debut in the opening round of the 2019 season.

== Early career ==
Atkins began playing in the VFL with Geelong in 2014. He spent his first year on the club's development list before playing VFL matches under the 23rd-player rule (which permitted teams to be expanded to allow players recently listed with a TAC Cup club to play with its VFL affiliate). In 2015, Atkins played for St Joseph's in the Geelong Football League, assisting in their first premiership victory since 1989. In the VFL, he played only ten games from 2014 to 2015, but became an important inside midfielder for Geelong in 2016 after others left the club or were injured. Atkins kicked 15 goals and averaged eight tackles, 18 disposals and four clearances per match, winning Geelong's best and fairest with 389 votes. He was also named in the VFL team of the year in the forward pocket and was considered by Fox Sports one of 15 VFL prospects likely to be selected in the 2016 AFL draft. Atkins' strong season attracted interest from interstate clubs but he stayed with Geelong.

In 2017, Atkins was Geelong's co-captain and became a permanent midfielder, but his season was interrupted by a hamstring injury causing him to miss six games. When uninjured he was still regularly named among Geelong's best and in round 18 laid 23 tackles against Collingwood, including 12 in the last quarter – the equal-most in a VFL match and the equal-second-most recorded by Champion Data in any competition. Atkins also kicked two goals and amassed 25 disposals to perform best on ground. He was again named, this time by ESPN, as a strong mature-age player likely to be drafted.

Atkins again missed out on selection in the 2017 draft, but was encouraged by Geelong's head of football Simon Lloyd to continue pushing for an AFL career. He was named Geelong's sole VFL captain and played every game in the 2018 season, with career-high averages of 21.8 disposals and 9.4 tackles. Atkins was among the VFL's top ten players in score assists, handballs, contested possessions, clearances and hard ball gets. He led the competition in tackles, recording 188, and captained the VFL team of the year as a rover. Atkins won his second Geelong best and fairest with 413 votes. He was named by AFL.com.au as among the best mature-age players ahead of the 2018 draft.

== AFL career ==
Atkins was selected by Geelong with pick 11 in the 2019 AFL rookie draft and cited as "another graduate of the Geelong VFL production line" alongside other AFL-listed players such as Tom Stewart, Scott Thompson and Shane Mumford. He anticipated playing primarily as a small forward rather than an inside midfielder as he had done in the VFL, due to Geelong's abundance of high-quality midfielders. Atkins made his debut in the opening round of the 2019 season against Collingwood at the Melbourne Cricket Ground.

During his first two seasons, Atkins was most used as a pressure forward by Geelong coach Chris Scott, switching to defence during the 2021 AFL season. He would take an opportunity to move into the Geelong midfield during the 2022 AFL season, with his tenacity and pressure often setting the tone for his teammates to follow. Atkins would play a key role in Geelong's 2022 success, with the club winning the 2022 AFL Grand Final. Atkins would finish fifth in the club's Carji Greeves Medal count, winning the Tom Harley Award as best clubman for 2022.

Atkins followed up 2022 with a strong season in 2023. He finished second to Tom Stewart in the 2023 Carji Greeves Medal count, and won the Tom Harley Award for best clubman for the second consecutive year.

== Statistics ==
Updated to the end of round 22, 2026.

Legend
G	Goals	K	Kicks	D	Disposals	T	Tackles
B	Behinds	H	Handballs	M	Marks
#	Played in that season's premiership team	†	Led the league for the season

Season	Team	No.	Games	Totals							Averages (per game)							Votes
Season	Team	No.	Games	G	B	K	H	D	M	T	G	B	K	H	D	M	T	Votes
2019	Geelong	30	23	5	4	122	162	284	36	110	0.2	0.2	5.3	7.0	12.3	1.6	4.8	0
2020 (Note: The 2020 season was played with 17 home-and-away matches per team (down from 22) and 16-minute quarters with time on (down from 20-minute quarters with time on) due to the impact of the COVID-19 pandemic.)	Geelong	30	12	4	1	43	74	117	11	38	0.3	0.1	3.6	6.2	9.8	0.9	3.2	0
2021	Geelong	30	22	0	1	207	169	376	84	75	0.0	0.0	9.4	7.7	17.1	3.8	3.4	0
2022^{#}	Geelong	30	25	4	3	238	214	452	65	157	0.2	0.1	9.5	8.6	18.1	2.6	6.3	0
2023	Geelong	30	23	4	1	195	251	446	33	175	0.2	0.0	8.5	10.9	19.4	1.4	7.6	1
2024	Geelong	30	22	0	3	176	201	377	34	142	0.0	0.1	8.0	9.1	17.1	1.5	6.5	1
2025	Geelong	30	26	5	4	223	288	511	52	232^{†}	0.2	0.2	8.6	11.1	19.7	2.0	8.9^{†}	3
2026	Geelong	30	21	4	1	161	230	391	31	127	0.2	0.0	7.7	11.0	18.6	1.5	6.0	2
Career			174	26	18	1365	1589	2954	346	1056	0.1	0.1	7.8	9.1	17.0	2.0	6.1	7

== Honours and achievements ==
Team

- AFL premiership player (Geelong): 2022
- 2× McClelland Trophy (Geelong): 2019, 2022

Individual

- Geelong F.C. Tom Harley Award for Best Clubman: 2022, 2023
- 2× Geelong F.C. VFL Best & Fairest: 2016, 2018
