= St Joseph's Football & Netball Club =

St Joseph’s

Names
- Full name: St Joseph’s Football & Netball Club Inc
- Nickname: Joeys

Club details
- Founded: 1973; 53 years ago
- Colours: Red, Gold, Black
- Competition: Geelong Football Netball League
- Premierships: (6): 1982, 1984, 1989, 2015, 2017, 2018
- Ground: Drew Reserve

Uniforms
Home

Other information
- Official website: stjoeys.com

St Joseph’s Football & Netball Club Inc, nicknamed the Joeys, is an Australian rules football and netball club based in the residential suburb of Herne Hill, Victoria. The club teams currently compete in the Geelong Football Netball League, the major regional league in Geelong.

== History ==
With less than four weeks to the start of the 1973 season junior club St Joseph’s was told that the Geelong & District Football League had passed a motion that all affiliated clubs had to field teams in all the main sections,(Seniors, Reserves, Under 18 and under 16). The club had to find a ground, a coach, committee and forty senior players necessary to keep the club afloat. Martin Bourke was appointed coach and Drew Reserve was obtained as a home ground.

They joined the Geelong & District Football League and won their first flag in 1982. In those days promotion to the Geelong Football League was automatic as was demotion. They were promoted, demoted then promoted again in three years. Since then it has stayed in the Geelong Football League since 1985.

The home ground Drew Reserve in Herne Hill was renamed in 2026 Plan Group Oval as a part of a naming rights deal with construction company Plan Group .

The club’s major sponsor since 2019 has been Geelong company QEST Infrastructure which specialises in underground assets management and civil infrastructure.

== Premierships ==
- Geelong Football League (4)
  - 1989, 2015, 2017, 2018
- Geelong & District Football League (2)
  - 1982, 1984

== Players ==
=== Notable players ===
Over thirty players have gone on to play AFL including

- Matthew Scarlett - Geelong
- Barry Stoneham - Geelong
- Cameron Ling - Geelong
- Taylor Adams - GWS Giants and Collingwood Football Club
- Nick Maxwell - Collingwood Football Club
- Sam Walsh - Carlton Football Club
- Alex Witherden-West Coast Eagles/Brisbane Lions
- Tom Doedee- Adelaide Crows
- Paddy McCartin-St Kilda/Sydney Swans
- Tom McCartin- Sydney Swans
- Tom Atkins-Geelong
- John Scarlett-Geelong/South Melbourne
- Michael Mansfield-Geelong
- Tim Darcy-Geelong
- Tom Stewart-Geelong

=== Notable netballer’s ===
- Molly Jovic- Collingwood, Melbourne Mavericks
- Alice Teague-Neeld- West Coast Fever

=== Current squad (2023) ===
1. Lewis Antonac; 2. Max McLachlan; 3. Charlie Clark; 4. Oscar Morrison; 5. Angus McKay; 6. Ollie Hanneysee; 7. Alex Hickey; 8. Josh Hovey; 9. Jarvis Miles; 11. Ryan Connolly; 12. Tanner Owen; 13. Joseph Chaplin; 14. Jack Buckley; 15. Felix Henderson; 16. Joel O'Dwyer; 17. Callum Mitchell; 18. Dylan Sharp; 20. Finn McCoombe; 21. Jaiden Reid; 22. Jake Cattanach; 23. Paddy De Grandi; 24. Ben Clark; 25. Jack Mullen; 26. Jed Warrin; 27. James Hickey; 28. Harry Nagle; 29. Avery Knight	30. Carl Daffy; 32. Jordan Muhor; 33. Archer Dibsdale; 34. Harry Smith; 35. Ayden Gras; 36. Lochlan Hocking; 37. Rory Nolan; 38. Nick Balic; 39. Joel Burns; 40. Tikei Hiku; 41. Ben Kamaric; 42. Oscar Hocking; 43. Hunter Lewis; 44. Gus Humphrey; 45. Harry Keane; 46. Zac Knights; 47. Lleyton Woolley; 48. Sam Threlfall; 50. Liam Kershaw; 52. Darcy Martin; 53. Ollie Northam; 54. Will McCaskil; 55. Darcy Nolan; 57. Ged Gallagher; 58. Hayden Nicol; 59. Zack Mongelli; 62. Aaron Vickery

== Bibliography ==
- Cat Country: History of Football In The Geelong Region by John Stoward - ISBN 978-0-9577515-8-3
