= Tom Doedee =

Australian rules footballer

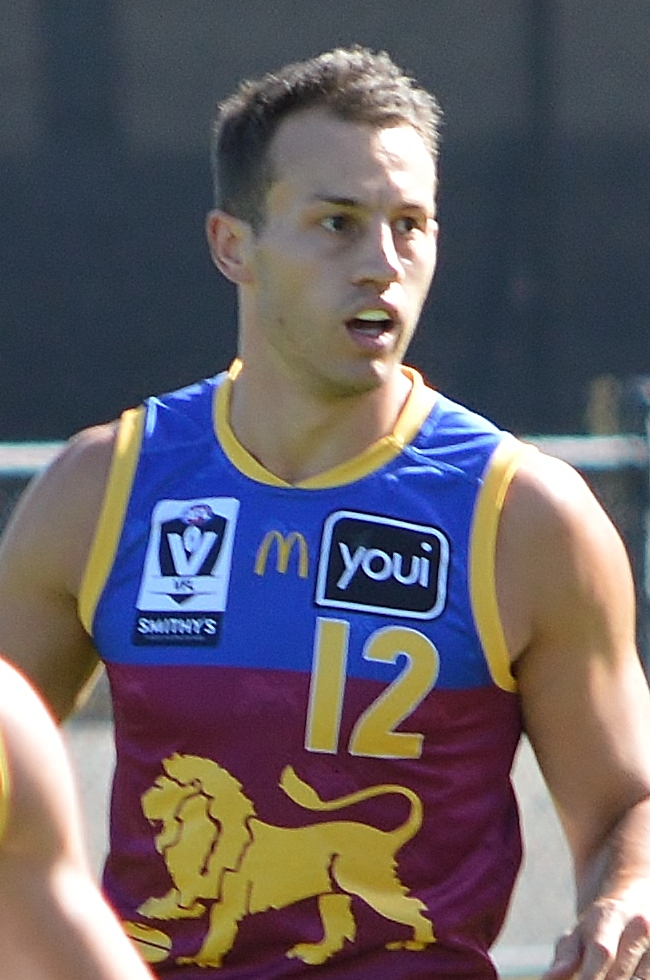
- Doedee in April 2025

Personal information
- Born: 1 March 1997 (age 29)
- Original team: Geelong Falcons (TAC Cup)/St Joseph's Football Club
- Draft: No. 17, 2015 national draft
- Debut: Round 1, 2018, Adelaide vs. Essendon, at Etihad Stadium
- Height: 187 cm (6 ft 2 in)
- Weight: 89 kg (196 lb)
- Position: Key defender

Club information
- Current club: Brisbane Lions
- Number: 12

Playing career^{1}
Years	Club	Games (Goals)
2016–2023	Adelaide	82 (3)
2024–	Brisbane Lions	1 (0)
Total		83 (3)
- ^{1} Playing statistics correct to the end of the 2025 season.

Career highlights
- AFL Rising Star nominee: 2018; 22under22 team: 2018; Signature

Tom Doedee (/ˈduːdeɪ/ DOO-day; born 1 March 1997) is a professional Australian rules footballer playing for the Brisbane Lions in the Australian Football League (AFL), having previously played for Adelaide.

== Early life ==
Doedee excelled as a junior basketballer from the age of six playing as a Point Guard in the Geelong Supercats junior teams. He also played junior football for St Joseph's in Geelong Football League.

He played for Victoria Country in the 2012 under-18 Australian basketball championships.

He sat out the Geelong Falcons 2014 preseason to concentrate on basketball, hoping for a possible scholarship in the United States. He played for Victoria Country in the under-18 Australian basketball championships in Canberra. He averaged six points and two assists from nine games.

He returned for the 2015 preseason at the Falcons but was hampered by injury and almost didn't make the cut. It forced him to start the practise matches in the equivalent of a Falcons’ reserves side. However, once injury-free Doedee impressed at Centre Half Back for the Falcons and played for Victoria Country in the AFL Under 18 Championships. Doedee was also invited to the Draft Combine where he finished fifth in the agility test and ninth in the relative vertical jump.

Prior to the 2015 AFL draft Doedee was regarded as the best one-on-one defender in the TAC Cup by Geelong Falcons talent manager Michael Turner and was tipped to be drafted around 35–40 overall.

== AFL career ==
=== Adelaide (2016–2023) ===
Doedee was drafted by Adelaide with their second selection and seventeenth overall in the 2015 national draft. In 2018, he made his debut in the twelve point loss to Essendon at Etihad Stadium in the opening round. In his second match, the thirty-six point win against Richmond at the Adelaide Oval in round two of the 2018 season, Doedee recorded twenty-five disposals and six marks to earn the round AFL Rising Star nomination. In 2018, Doedee extended his contract by two years (until 2021) after missing just two games of the season. He placed second in the 2018 AFL Rising Star after averaging 18 disposals and two intercept marks per match. However, during the first round of the 2019 season, he ruptured his ACL in the second quarter of the 32 point loss to Hawthorn and did not return for the remainder of the season. In the 2020 season, shortened to 18 rounds due to the COVID-19 pandemic, Tom played nine games but a hamstring injury ruled him out for the last seven games for the season. Tom captained the club for a couple of games due to the absence of captain Rory Sloane and vice-captain Tom Lynch. He was picked over the two other available leadership team members (Matt Crouch and Brodie Smith) and was only 23 years old with 26 games experience.

=== Brisbane (2024–present) ===
Following a 2023 AFL season in which he ruptured his ACL for a second time, Doedee exercised his rights as a restricted free agent and joined the Brisbane Lions on a four-year deal.

== Statistics ==
Updated to the end of the 2025 season.

Legend
G	Goals	K	Kicks	D	Disposals	T	Tackles
B	Behinds	H	Handballs	M	Marks

Season	Team	No.	Games	Totals							Averages (per game)							Votes
Season	Team	No.	Games	G	B	K	H	D	M	T	G	B	K	H	D	M	T	Votes
2016	Adelaide	39	0	—	—	—	—	—	—	—	—	—	—	—	—	—	—	0
2017	Adelaide	39	0	—	—	—	—	—	—	—	—	—	—	—	—	—	—	0
2018	Adelaide	39	20	2	0	168	193	361	111	60	0.1	0.0	8.4	9.7	18.1	5.6	3.0	0
2019	Adelaide	39	1	0	0	5	3	8	3	1	0.0	0.0	5.0	3.0	8.0	3.0	1.0	0
2020 (Note: The 2020 season was played with 17 home-and-away matches per team (down from 22) and 16-minute quarters with time on (down from 20-minute quarters with time on) due to the impact of the COVID-19 pandemic.)	Adelaide	39	9	0	0	75	53	128	47	16	0.0	0.0	8.3	5.9	14.2	5.2	1.8	0
2021	Adelaide	39	21	1	1	203	145	348	100	47	0.0	0.0	9.7	6.9	16.6	4.8	2.2	0
2022	Adelaide	39	20	0	0	171	152	323	81	34	0.0	0.0	8.6	7.6	16.2	4.1	1.7	0
2023	Adelaide	39	11	0	0	92	73	165	49	15	0.0	0.0	8.4	6.6	15.0	4.5	1.4	0
2024	Brisbane Lions	12	0	—	—	—	—	—	—	—	—	—	—	—	—	—	—	0
2025	Brisbane Lions	12	1	0	0	8	2	10	6	0	0.0	0.0	8.0	2.0	10.0	6.0	0.0	0
Career			83	3	1	722	621	1343	397	173	0.0	0.0	8.7	7.5	16.2	4.8	2.1	0
