= Ernest Newling =

Australian rules footballer

Personal information
- Full name: Ernest Edward Newling
- Born: 26 June 1876; Geelong, Victoria
- Died: 30 November 1944 (aged 68); Newtown, Victoria
- Original team: Geelong West (GDFA)
- Height: 188 cm (6 ft 2 in)
- Weight: 94 kg (207 lb)

Playing career^{1}
Years	Club	Games (Goals)
1900–1910	Geelong	150 (22)
- ^{1} Playing statistics correct to the end of 1910.

Ernest "Bung" Newling (26 June 1876 – 30 November 1944) was an Australian rules footballer who played with Geelong in the Victorian Football League (VFL).

Newling, who was blind in one eye, played as a defender and follower. He arrived at the club from Geelong West.

He was just the third Geelong player to appear in 150 league games, after Teddy Rankin and Henry Young. Despite his disability with the use of one eye, he managed to make 148 with Geelong B side against Belmont in a 1901/02 Geelong Cricket Association First Eleven Match.

He is buried at the East Geelong Cemetery Humble Street side.
