= Cameron Ling =

Australian rules footballer

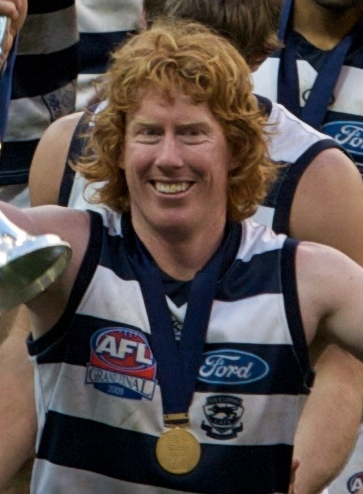
- Ling pictured after the 2009 AFL Grand Final

Personal information
- Full name: Cameron Neville Ling
- Nickname: Lingy
- Born: 27 February 1981 (age 45); Geelong, Victoria
- Original team: Geelong Falcons/St Joseph's
- Draft: 38th overall, 1999; Geelong
- Height: 189 cm (6 ft 2 in)
- Weight: 92 kg (203 lb)
- Position: Midfielder

Playing career
| Years | Club | Games (Goals) |
| 2000–2011 | Geelong | 246 (139) |

Career highlights
- 3× AFL Premiership player: 2007, 2009, 2011 (c); All-Australian team: 2007; Geelong captain: 2010–2011; Madden Medal: 2011; Carji Greeves Medal: 2004; St Joseph's College Team of Champions

Cameron Neville Ling (born 27 February 1981) is a former Australian rules footballer and three-time premiership player who played for the Geelong Football Club in the Australian Football League (AFL). A tagger at 1.89 metres (6 ft 2 in) and 94 kilograms (207 lb), Ling was also a premiership-winning captain at the club in 2011.

He is now a commentator on AFL football for the Seven Network and a special comments commentator on AFL football for ABC Radio Grandstand. He is also a member of the selection panel for the AFL All-Australian team and the AFL Rising Star Award.

== Football career ==
Ling played junior football for the Geelong Falcons as a full-forward and was drafted by his hometown club, the Geelong Football Club.

In 2007, his on-field performances were rewarded with selection in the 2007 All-Australian team on the interchange. He also played a solid role in their 2007 premiership later that year in which Geelong broke a 44-year premiership drought and won by a record-breaking 119 points against Port Adelaide, a record that stands to this day.

Ling served as vice-captain in their 2009 season, including the 2009 premiership in which he was considered among Geelong's best players.

On 20 January 2010, Cameron Ling was announced as the team's new captain, taking over from the recently retired Tom Harley. He captained the Cats in the 2010 AFL season and the 2011 AFL season. In 2011, he captained Geelong to their third premiership in 5 years, against Collingwood. He kicked the final goal of the match after a turnover from Héritier Lumumba.

Shortly after guiding the Cats to their 9th premiership win in their history, Cameron Ling announced his retirement on 5 October 2011. Being able to nullify the opposition's best midfielder whilst managing to influence matches has made Cameron Ling regarded as one of the best-ever taggers to play AFL. He was succeeded as captain by Joel Selwood.

== Post-playing days ==
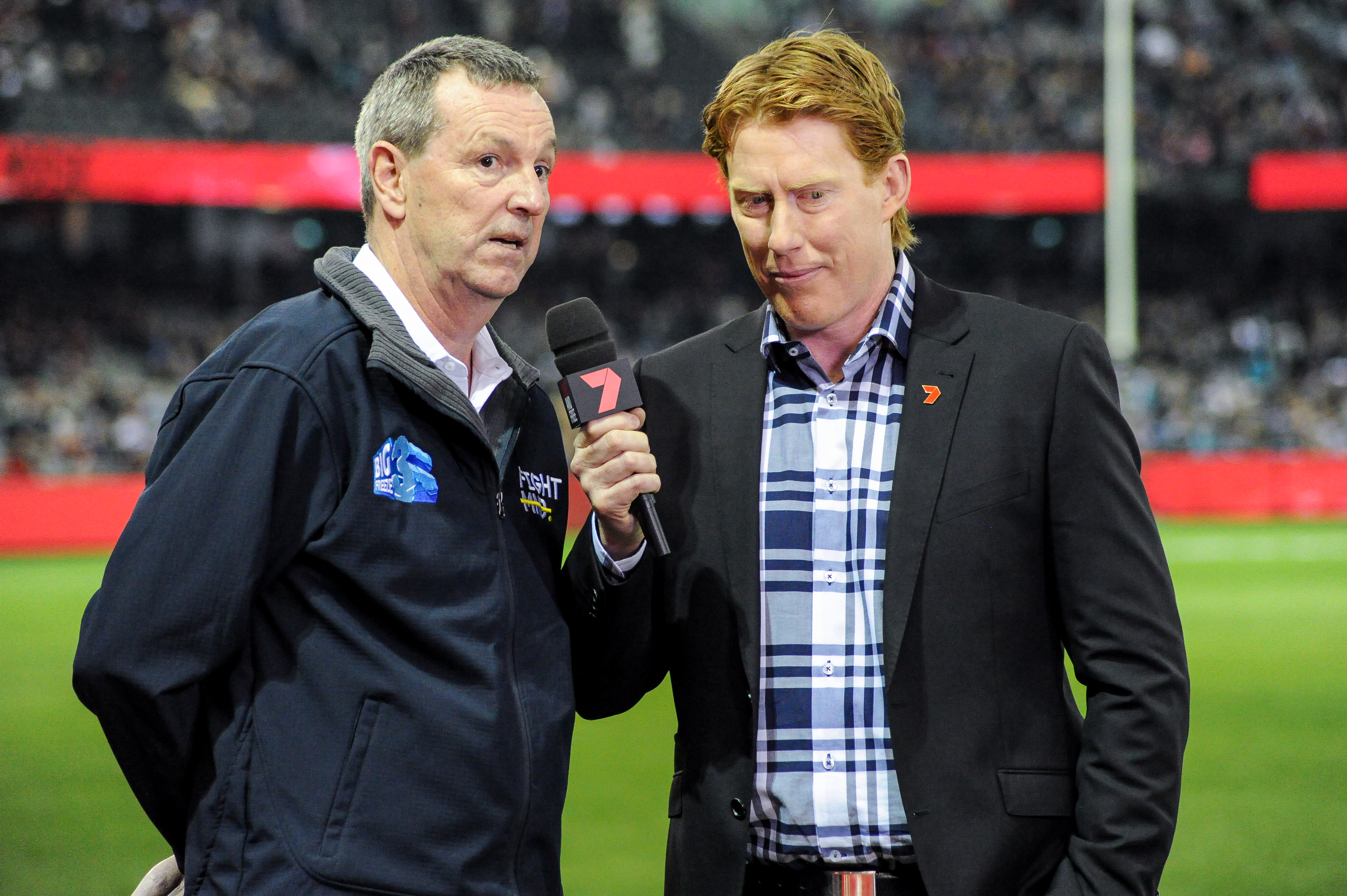
Ling interviewing Neale Daniher in June 2017

In November 2011, Ling announced he would join the Seven Network in a commentary role on one of their Saturday night games; he also has commentated on Friday night matches. At the beginning of the 2012 Associated Public Schools of Victoria football season, Ling took up the position of Director of Football at Geelong Grammar School.

On 9 October 2013, Ling was appointed to work one day per week during the 2014 season on the development of the North Melbourne leadership group.

Ling is an Australian Apprenticeships Ambassador for the Australian Government.

In May 2022, Ling joined K Rock 95.5 as co-host of the breakfast show,Tom, Lingy & Loggy.

== "Mayor" of Geelong ==
In what started as a joke, following the hype of the Cats drought-breaking premiership, Cameron Ling was touted as the 'mayor of Geelong', a humorous reference to the way he is idolised by Geelong people.

On Wednesday 3 October 2007, though, Geelong's then Mayor, councillor Bruce Harwood, agreed that he'd be happy to temporarily step down for Ling. Ling's interest in politics and his intelligence is widely known, while it's been reported that he took a significant interest in local council and leadership during his days at St. Joseph's College, Geelong.

During the Premiership celebratory parade through Geelong's streets on 3 October 2007, Ling acknowledged his title as mayor; however, despite the contention it raised, it was never formalised and was merely a tongue-in-cheek publicity stunt.

== Personal life ==
In December 2012, Ling's partner Nicole Dodds gave birth to their first child Max Ling.

In 2020 he was named in the St Joseph's College team of champions, recognising the best VFL/AFL players to have attended the school.

== Statistics ==
Legend
| G | Goals | K | Kicks | D | Disposals | T | Tackles |
| B | Behinds | H | Handballs | M | Marks |

| Season | Team | No. | Games | Totals | | | | | | | Averages (per game) | | | | | | |
| Season | Team | No. | Games | G | B | K | H | D | M | T | G | B | K | H | D | M | T |
|---|---|---|---|---|---|---|---|---|---|---|---|---|---|---|---|---|---|
| 2000 | Geelong | 45 | 10 | 3 | 1 | 45 | 26 | 71 | 25 | 7 | 0.3 | 0.1 | 4.5 | 2.6 | 7.1 | 2.5 | 0.7 |
| 2001 | Geelong | 45 | 13 | 8 | 3 | 104 | 61 | 165 | 43 | 30 | 0.6 | 0.2 | 8.0 | 4.7 | 12.7 | 3.3 | 2.3 |
| 2002 | Geelong | 45 | 21 | 11 | 8 | 248 | 167 | 415 | 85 | 49 | 0.5 | 0.4 | 11.8 | 8.0 | 19.8 | 4.0 | 2.3 |
| 2003 | Geelong | 45 | 21 | 4 | 5 | 280 | 242 | 522 | 112 | 53 | 0.2 | 0.2 | 13.3 | 11.5 | 24.9 | 5.3 | 2.5 |
| 2004 | Geelong | 45 | 25 | 16 | 5 | 357 | 235 | 592 | 168 | 72 | 0.6 | 0.2 | 14.3 | 9.4 | 23.7 | 6.7 | 2.9 |
| 2005 | Geelong | 45 | 23 | 11 | 9 | 307 | 260 | 567 | 139 | 50 | 0.5 | 0.4 | 13.4 | 11.3 | 24.6 | 6.0 | 2.2 |
| 2006 | Geelong | 45 | 22 | 10 | 3 | 248 | 255 | 503 | 131 | 61 | 0.4 | 0.1 | 11.3 | 11.6 | 22.9 | 6.0 | 2.8 |
| 2007 | Geelong | 45 | 24 | 28 | 6 | 215 | 261 | 476 | 107 | 69 | 1.2 | 0.2 | 9.0 | 10.9 | 19.8 | 4.5 | 2.9 |
| 2008 | Geelong | 45 | 23 | 15 | 5 | 237 | 309 | 546 | 106 | 79 | 0.6 | 0.2 | 10.3 | 13.4 | 23.7 | 4.6 | 3.4 |
| 2009 | Geelong | 45 | 22 | 7 | 7 | 235 | 265 | 500 | 100 | 106 | 0.3 | 0.3 | 10.7 | 12.0 | 22.7 | 4.6 | 4.8 |
| 2010 | Geelong | 45 | 21 | 9 | 12 | 211 | 253 | 464 | 76 | 112 | 0.4 | 0.6 | 10.0 | 12.0 | 22.1 | 3.6 | 5.3 |
| 2011 | Geelong | 45 | 21 | 17 | 9 | 265 | 192 | 457 | 74 | 92 | 0.8 | 0.4 | 12.6 | 9.1 | 21.8 | 3.5 | 4.4 |
| Career | | | 246 | 139 | 73 | 2752 | 2526 | 5278 | 1166 | 780 | 0.6 | 0.3 | 11.2 | 10.3 | 21.5 | 4.7 | 3.2 |

== Honours and achievements ==
Brownlow Medal votes
| Season | Votes |
| 2000 | 0 |
| 2001 | 2 |
| 2002 | 12 |
| 2003 | 12 |
| 2004 | 12 |
| 2005 | 13 |
| 2006 | 6 |
| 2007 | 1 |
| 2008 | 9 |
| 2009 | 2 |
| 2010 | 2 |
| 2011 | 0 |
| Total | 71 |

- Team
  - AFL Premiership (Geelong): 2007, 2009, 2011 (C)
  - McClelland Trophy (Geelong): 2007, 2008
  - NAB Cup (Geelong): 2006, 2009
- Individual
  - All-Australian: 2007
  - Carji Greeves Medal: 2004
  - Australian representative honours in International rules football: 2002
  - Geelong F.C. Best First Year Reserves Player Award: 2000
  - Geelong F.C. Most Improved Player Award: 2001
  - Geelong F.C. Most club votes in Brownlow Medal: 2002, 2003, 2005
  - Geelong F.C. Community Champion Award: 2003
  - Geelong F.C. Most Determined and Most Dedicated Player Award: 2005
  - Geelong F.C Coach's Award: 2008
  - Captain of Geelong F.C.: 2010–2011
  - Vice-captain of Geelong F.C.: 2006–2009
  - Deputy vice-captain of Geelong F.C.: 2005
  - AFL Rising Star nomination: 2001
  - Vic Country representative honours at the AFL Under 18 Championships: 1998, 1999
  - Captain of Geelong Falcons (TAC Cup): 1998
  - TAC Cup Team of the Year: 1998
  - Australian (Under-17) representative honours in International rules football: 1998
