= John Scarlett (footballer) =

Australian rules footballer (1947–2019)

Personal information
- Full name: John Patrick Scarlett
- Born: 29 May 1947; England, U.K.
- Died: 31 July 2019 (aged 72)
- Original team: St Joseph's
- Height: 191 cm (6 ft 3 in)
- Weight: 86 kg (190 lb)

Playing career^{1}
Years	Club	Games (Goals)
1967–1977	Geelong	183 (42)
1977–1978	South Melbourne	29 (2)
Total		212 (44)
- ^{1} Playing statistics correct to the end of 1979.

John Patrick Scarlett (29 May 1947 – 31 July 2019) was an Australian rules footballer who played for Geelong and South Melbourne. Scarlett was a fullback and his son Matthew played in that same position for Geelong.

Scarlett was a reserve in the 1967 VFL Grand Final. In the third round of 1971, Scarlett held Hawthorn champion Peter Hudson, who equalled the league record of 150 goals in a season that year, to just one goal in the final quarter, although Geelong still lost by eight points. He also kept Hudson to three goals the previous season when he set the home-and-away record of 146 goals.
