= Leo Turner =

Australian rules footballer

Personal information
- Born: 15 May 1928
- Died: 17 December 1997 (aged 69)
- Original team: Belmont
- Height: 179 cm (5 ft 10 in)
- Weight: 76 kg (168 lb)

Playing career^{1}
Years	Club	Games (Goals)
1947–1954	Geelong	130 (30)
- ^{1} Playing statistics correct to the end of 1954.

Leo Turner (15 May 1928 – 17 December 1997) was an Australian rules footballer who played for Geelong in the Victorian Football League (VFL). He was named in 2001 as a wingman in the club's official 'Team of the Century' with his son Michael named in the same position.

Turner was a left footer and had made his debut with Geelong in 1947. He was a member of their back-to-back premiership sides in 1951 and 1952 and represented Victoria 13 times in interstate football.
