= Henry Young (footballer) =

Australian rules footballer (1873–1923)

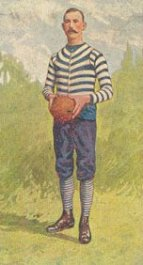

Personal information
- Full name: Henry Young
- Born: 16 May 1873; Geelong
- Died: 10 January 1923 (aged 49); Geelong Swimming Baths
- Original team: Geelong West
- Height: 191 cm (6 ft 3 in)
- Weight: 90 kg (198 lb)

Playing career^{1}
Years	Club	Games (Goals)
1892–1896	Geelong (VFA)	47 (9)
1897–1910	Geelong	167 (76)
Total		214 (85)

Representative team honours
Years	Team	Games (Goals)
	Victoria	7 (5)
- ^{1} Playing statistics correct to the end of 1910.

Career highlights
- Geelong best and fairest 1905, 1906; Geelong captain 1901–1909; Geelong Team of the Century

Henry "Tracker" Young (16 May 1873 – 10 January 1923) was an Australian rules footballer in the Victorian Football League (VFL). He competed in several sports, including Australian rules football, boxing, cycling (in the Melbourne to Warrnambool road race), and rowing.

== Family ==
The son of Samuel Young (1840–1923), and Margaret Young (–1926), née Calhoun, Henry Young was born in Geelong on 16 May 1873.

He married Ruby May Gaylard (1886–1940) in 1920. Ruby remarried in 1923. Both she and her second husband, Leslie Alexander Eastgate, died as the result of an accident on 20 December 1940.

== Football ==
Young was a tap-ruckman recruited from Wellington, a local team, who first played in the Victorian Football Association (VFA) days.

He played as a ruckman, and opposing rovers often attempted to play off his hit outs.

Young missed games due to injuries in 1898 and 1899, but returned to captain the club in 137 games.

Tracker also won the Geelong Best and Fairest Award (pre-Carji Greeves Medal) in 1905 and 1906.

== Rowing ==
An outstanding oarsman, he was the honorary rowing coach of Geelong College from 1917 until his death in 1923.

== Death ==
Young died of heart failure — "having been under special treatment for heart trouble during the last four months" — at the age of 49, shortly after a swim.

"With the death of Henry Young Geelong has lost its greatest athlete. As a citizen and a comrade the loss is still greater. He was a good club man and friend, and played the game, no matter what it might be, with all the vigor and power that was in him. He took care that he was always physically fit, and gave of his best to the side, and help to a mate who needed it in a hard contest. To friend and foe alike, he always played his hardest, but always played the game, with the result that he had not an enemy among those against whom he competed. At the close of a contest, no matter how vigorous it was, or how the result went, he would give or accept congratulations, knowing that, on his part, there was no incident to have regret over. He was never happier than when imparting knowledge to a beginner."
Charles Brownlow (chairman of the Australian Football Council, and secretary of the Geelong Football Club).

== Recognition ==
In 1996 he was inducted (as one of 138 inductees) into the inaugural AFL Hall of Fame.

In 1996, he was named as the resting forward-pocket ruckman in the Geelong Football Club's Team of the Century; and, in 2002, he was declared to be one of the Geelong Football Club Legends, among the inaugural group of 20 highly significant former players.

== See also ==
- 1908 Melbourne Carnival
