= Terry Bright =

Australian rules footballer

Personal information
- Born: 12 February 1958 (age 68)
- Original team: Geelong West (VFA)
- Height: 188 cm (6 ft 2 in)
- Weight: 87 kg (192 lb)

Playing career^{1}
Years	Club	Games (Goals)
1976–1987	Geelong	219 (331)

Representative team honours
Years	Team	Games (Goals)
	Victoria	3 (?)
- ^{1} Playing statistics correct to the end of 1987.

Career highlights
- 3× Geelong leading goalkicker; Victorian interstate representative (3 games)

Terry Bright (born 12 February 1958) is a former Australian rules footballer who played for Geelong in the VFL.

== Playing career ==
After winning a Victorian Football Association (VFA) premiership with Geelong West in 1975, he was recruited by the Cats with whom he played 219 VFL games. He was used as a forward but was sometimes seen across half back.

Bright has been inducted into the Geelong Football Club hall of fame.

While playing Australian rules football, Bright would also play cricket in the local Geelong Cricket Association competition for Geelong West. A talented batsman, he was a member of the club's 1990/91 division one premiership team.

== Coaching career ==
After retiring from player, Bright later coached the Geelong Falcons to the inaugural premiership in the VSFL Under-18 competition (later TAC Cup) in 1992.

He would later be an assistant coach at Geelong, coaching the club's reserves team for three seasons, until he departed the club at the end of the 1998 AFL season to take up a role as an assistant coach at the Fremantle Dockers with former team mate Damian Drum.

Bright would coach a number of local clubs in Geelong competitions, including Geelong West-St Peters, St Mary's, and Newtown & Chilwell.

He would finish his coaching career in 2014, stepping down as coach of Geelong West-St Peters.

== Family ==
Bright is the nephew of former Geelong player and coach Bill Goggin. His son Michael was on Geelong's VFL list for a period of time in the early 2000s.
