= Tom Harley =

Australian rules footballer, born 1978

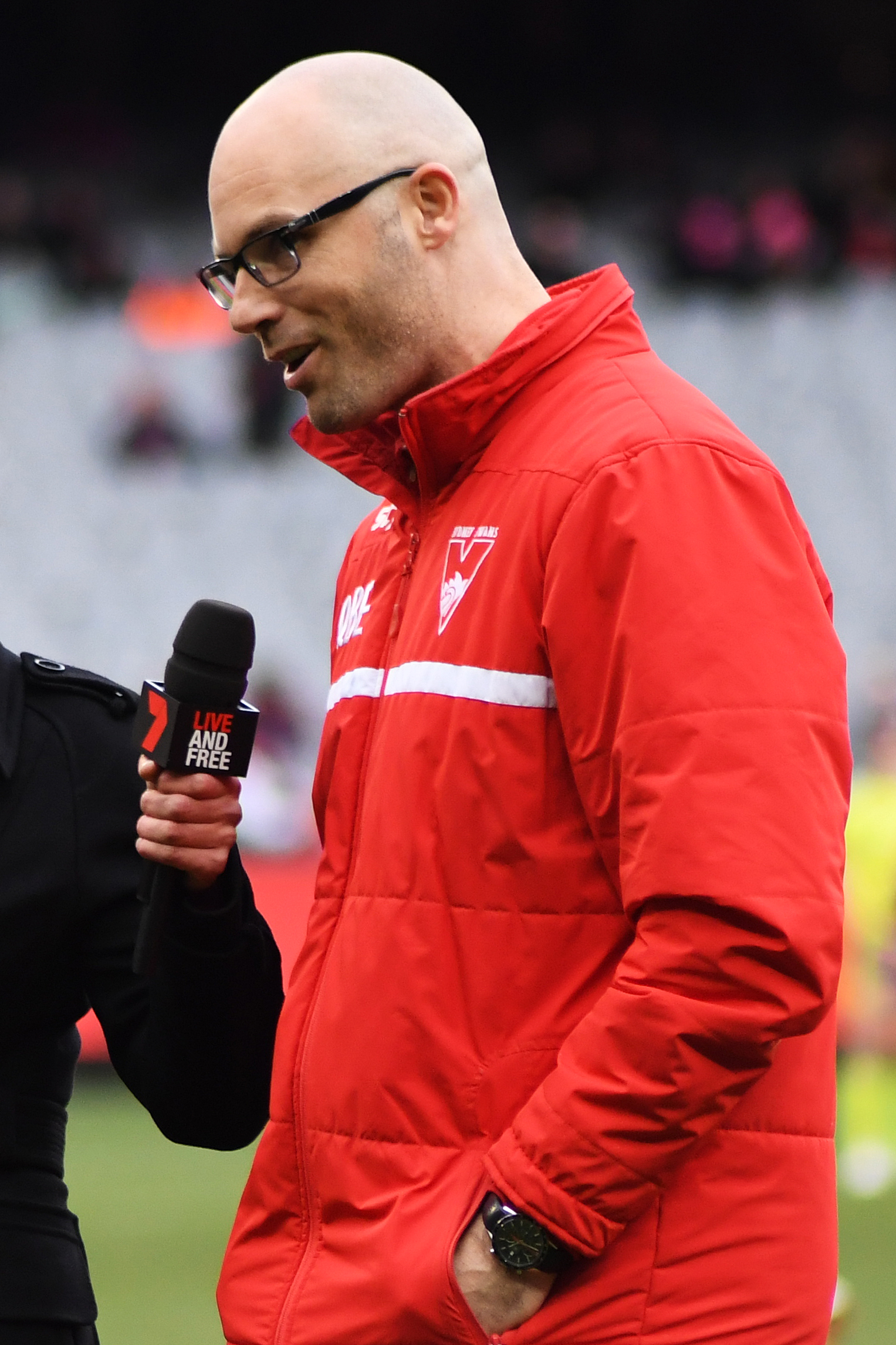
- Harley with Sydney in August 2018

Personal information
- Full name: Thomas Harley
- Born: 18 July 1978 (age 48); Adelaide, South Australia
- Original team: Norwood (SANFL)/St Peter’s College
- Draft: Zone/Concession, 1996 draft Port Adelaide
- Height: 193 cm (6 ft 4 in)
- Weight: 95 kg (209 lb)
- Position: Centre Half Back

Playing career^{1}
Years	Club	Games (Goals)
1998	Port Adelaide	1 (1)
1999–2009	Geelong	197 (11)
Total		198 (12)
- ^{1} Playing statistics correct to the end of 2009.

Career highlights
- 2× AFL premiership captain: 2007, 2009; Geelong captain: 2007–2009; All-Australian team: 2008

Thomas Harley (born 18 July 1978) is a former professional Australian rules footballer who played for the Port Adelaide Football Club and the Geelong Football Club in the Australian Football League (AFL). A defender at 1.93 metres (6 ft 4 in) and 95 kilograms (209 lb), Harley is a two-time premiership-winning captain at Geelong.

After a successful junior career which culminated with selection in the under-18 All-Australian team, Harley was drafted to Port Adelaide as a zone selection. Although an inaugural member of the club, Harley struggled to force his way into the senior team and spent the majority of his early years playing for Norwood in the South Australian National Football League (SANFL). After making just one appearance for Port Adelaide, Harley was traded to the Geelong Football Club in exchange for the 37th draft pick in the 1998 AFL draft.

Harley quickly established himself within the Geelong defence and received a range of accolades and club honours, including multiple Best Clubman awards. Prior to the 2007 AFL season, Harley was appointed club captain and went on to enjoy great individual and team success. He led the club to its first premiership in 44 years during 2007, and became a dual premiership captain after their victory in 2009. In between, he achieved All-Australian honours as vice-captain of the team, and won the AFL Players Association (AFLPA) Best Captain Award. Harley was also inducted into the Geelong Football Club Hall of Fame.

He is noted for being a leading ambassador to various community campaigns, including the anti-violence program 'Just Think' and Barwon Health. Since his retirement as a player, Harley has undertaken various roles in the sporting industry: he held the position of "General Manager - Football" with the Sydney Swans, and became their CEO in 2019. He was appointed COO of the AFL in 2025.

== Early life ==
One of three children born to Rick and Trish (née Rofe) Harley in Adelaide, South Australia. Tom played most of his junior football for the Walkerville Junior Football Club and St Peter's College from the under–11s to under–15s.

Despite being regularly overlooked for a place in the elite South Australian junior state squads, he continued to follow the rest of the squad to training sessions in order to learn alongside them. Harley's persistent attendance at training was rewarded when he was called up to the under–18s squad as a late injury replacement a week prior to the national AFL championships. Playing at centre half-back, Harley's performance in defence earned him end-of-year All-Australian honours and brought him to the attention of AFL scouts.

== AFL career ==
=== Port Adelaide experience (1998) ===
Following their entry into the AFL in 1997, Port Adelaide drafted Harley to the club as part of their zone selections, which entitled them to recruit uncontracted players from the South Australian National Football League (SANFL) prior to the 1996 National Draft. He struggled to break into the Port Adelaide senior team, and often found himself playing in the SANFL reserves for Norwood during the 1997 season, where he helped the team reach the SANFL reserves Grand Final, where they were defeated by Port Adelaide. Harley's contributions in the reserves team throughout the year saw him promoted to the senior Norwood side, where he featured in two of their SANFL finals before missing selection for the senior SANFL Grand Final.

Harley continued to ply his trade in the SANFL reserves during the 1998 season, before being rewarded mid-season with a senior team debut for Port Adelaide in round fourteen against Geelong. The team opted to use Harley sparingly off the bench, with Harley's only meaningful contribution being a late goal scored with his only kick for the game. Returning to the Norwood reserves team, Harley helped the team reach their second successive Grand Final appearance against Port Adelaide and capture the reserves premiership. However, after struggling to break into the senior side, Harley was traded to Geelong during the off-season for the 37th pick in the 1998 AFL draft.

=== Mixed success (1999–2006) ===
Harley made his debut for Geelong in round fourteen of the 1999 AFL season against Adelaide, and kept his position in the senior team for the final nine games of the home-and-away campaign. The following season, Harley helped Geelong achieve a 12 wins, nine losses and one draw record to qualify for the finals series. Harley made his finals debut in the first Elimination Final against Hawthorn, where he gathered seven disposals and took two marks in the clubs' nine-point loss.

His consistency throughout the year, during which he played in all club fixture games for the first time in his career, was rewarded when he won the club's Most Determined and Dedicated Player Award. Harley made his 50th senior appearance for the club the following season, and again featured in all 22 games over the next two seasons. Despite the club's inability to qualify for the finals series, Harley's consistency in the backline was recognised with successive top-five placings in the club best and fairest award. During this period Harley was also awarded the Coach's Award and Best Clubman Award respectively.

=== Captaining the Cats (2007–2009) ===
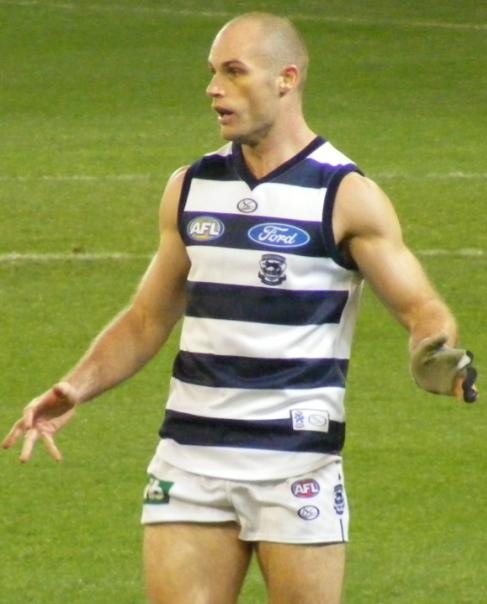
Harley playing for Geelong in 2008

At the beginning of 2007, Harley was appointed as club captain of Geelong. Harley's elevation to the captaincy was considered a surprise move to many outside the club. Despite the reaction, Harley was recommended by the club's board of directors following a review of the football department the previous year. The club noted that Harley "was a player who would dig deep and stand up when it counts", and was also chosen to help improve communication links between players, coaching staff and the board of directors.

Harley endured a difficult start to his first season as captain, as he ruptured a finger tendon during the club's round one loss to the Western Bulldogs. After undergoing surgery on his finger, Harley made his return through the club's reserves team in the VFL but failed to earn a recall to the senior team until round ten. After playing the majority of his career at Geelong as a centre half back, Harley struggled to find his niche in the defence following the emergence of the younger Matthew Egan in the key position. He soon adjusted himself as a floating defender capable of playing on small forwards, and retained his position in the side after achieving career-best averages of 14 disposals and 5 marks a game. Harley helped the team compile an 18–4 win–loss record at the conclusion of the home and away season, earning them their eighth McClelland Trophy and securing first position on the ladder leading into the finals series. Harley led the defence to the number one defensive record in the league during the season, by letting only 1664 points be scored against them. After wins against North Melbourne and Collingwood in the Qualifying and Preliminary finals respectively, Geelong earned a spot in the Grand Final against Harley's former team Port Adelaide. Collecting 13 disposals and seven marks, Harley helped the club to an AFL-record 119-point win and secure its first premiership in 44 years. Harley became the first Geelong captain of a premiership-winning side since Fred Wooller in 1963, and achieved the rare distinction of becoming a premiership-winning captain in his first year at the helm.

Harley's leadership qualities and influence on the club as captain was commended early on in the season after his handling of teammate Steve Johnson's off-field discretions. Johnson was banished from the team during the pre-season and demoted to the reserves for the first five games of the season. However, he successfully returned to the team and finished the season as a Norm Smith Medallist and All-Australian. Harley's leadership influence on the team was reflected in his finishing fourth in the AFLPA Best Captain award during his first year at the helm. He was also awarded life membership of the Geelong Football Club following his 150th team appearance in the round sixteen win against the Western Bulldogs, and named in the end-of-season South Australian State of Origin team.

Harley's achievements at the club were recognised prior to the 2008 AFL season when he was inducted into the Geelong Football Club Hall of Fame. Following the success of 2007, Harley and the club were expected to feature prominently in the 2008 finals series once more. Harley featured in all 22 home-and-away fixture games and three finals games. He set career-highs of 14 marks (round three) and 14 handpasses (Preliminary Final) in the process, and helped the club achieve the number one defensive record during the season for the second consecutive year. During the season, he was also selected to the initial squad for the AFL Hall of Fame all-star game, although he failed to make the final teams. Geelong compiled a 21–1 win–loss record to once again capture the McClelland Trophy and qualify for the finals series in first position on the ladder. After successive wins against St Kilda and the Western Bulldogs, Harley led the team to their second straight Grand Final appearance. During the Grand Final, Harley suffered mild concussion following a collision prior to the half-time break. As a result, he struggled to contribute for the rest of the game as Geelong lost to Hawthorn by 26 points.

Despite the club's Grand Final defeat, Harley collected a range of individual accolades following his performances throughout the season. He earned his first All-Australian honour and was named as vice-captain of the team. Harley was also recognised by the AFLPA, as he was awarded the AFLPA Best Captain award in just his second season at the helm. After setting career-highs of 209 handballs and 378 disposals during the season, Harley was awarded a career-high seven Brownlow Medal votes during the count and named once again in the South Australian State of Origin team. He was also awarded the Geelong Football Club Best Clubman award for a record third time, and named a co-winner of the club's Community Champion award alongside teammates James Kelly and David Wojcinski.

Harley was charged with helping the players regroup following the Grand Final loss the previous season, and admitted "losing the grand final was horrific". Harley missed the first six rounds of the 2009 campaign with a knee injury, before returning to feature in fourteen games for the year. Despite Harley's injury-riddled campaign, Geelong finished the home-and-away campaign in second place on the ladder with an 18–4 win–loss record. Following the failure of 2008, Harley suggested that the club had learned that it needed to "just be the best team in September" and that once qualified for the finals, focus had shifted towards rest and recovery.

After finals win against the Western Bulldogs and Collingwood, Harley and Geelong progressed through to the Grand Final against St Kilda for a third successive season. During the final, Harley struggled to stay involved in the game and gathered five disposals, one mark, and three tackles. However, Geelong prevailed by 12 points to win the 2009 AFL premiership and capture its second premiership cup within three seasons.

At the conclusion of the 2009 season, Harley announced his retirement from AFL football. Harley cited his inability to physically meet the demands of AFL football as his reason for departing the game. Harley retired as one of the most successful captains in Geelong's history: during his three years as captain, Harley led the club to a club-high two premierships—equalling the accomplishments of Fred Flanagan—and compiled a 49–7 win–loss record. His legacy at the club was pronounced by Thompson as being "one of the great captains in the history of the Geelong Football Club".

Harley's achievements during his playing career were recognised when he was nominated for a record four awards during the AFL Player's Association Madden Medal night: the Madden Medal, the Football Achievement award, the Personal Development award, and the Community Spirit award.

== After retiring as a player ==
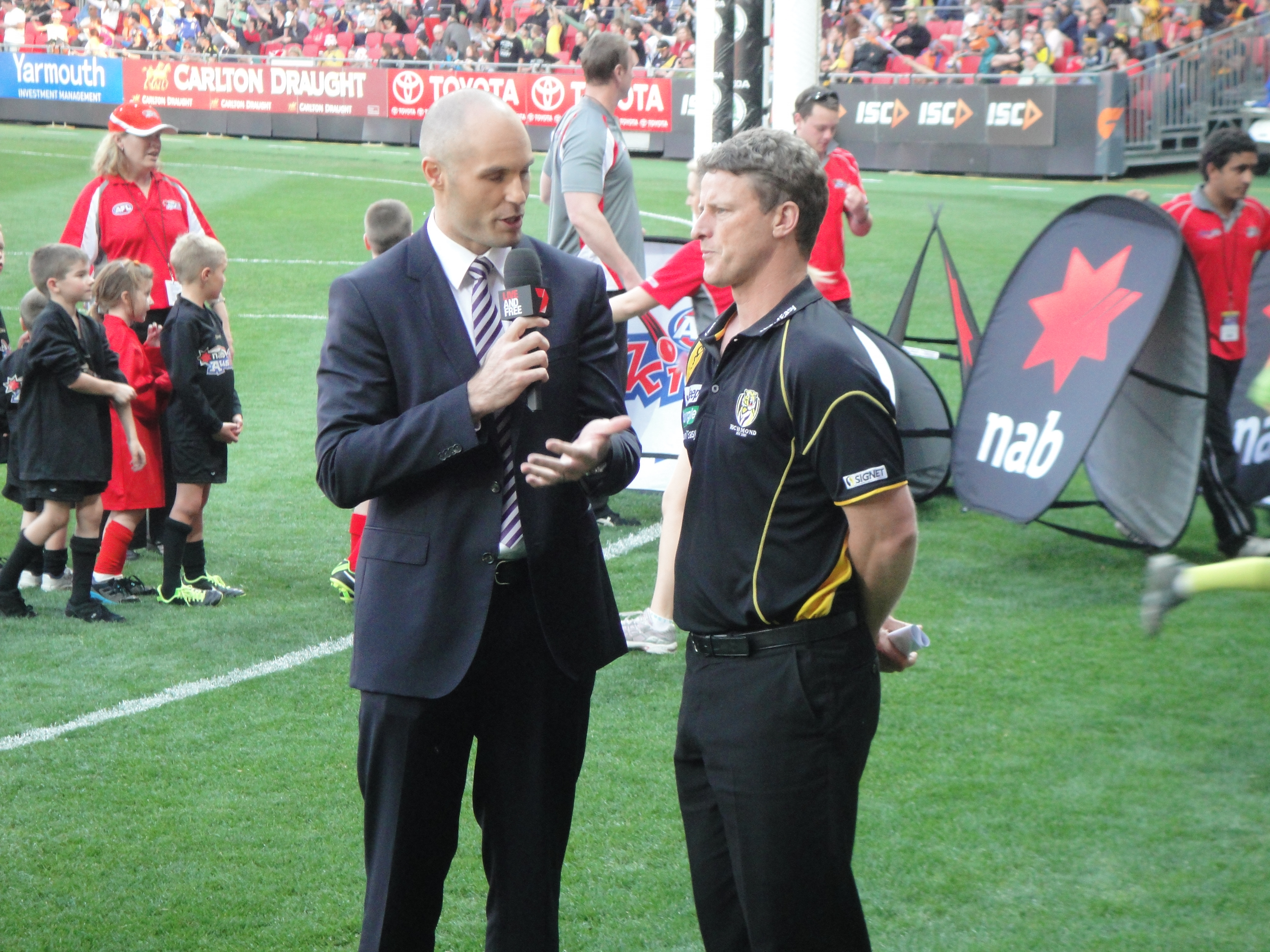
Tom Harley interviewing Richmond coach Damien Hardwick in 2013.

In the weeks following his retirement, Harley was sounded out by the AFL's newest team, Greater Western Sydney Giants, to join the club in an off-field role. On 4 December 2009, it was announced that Harley would join the club as a project consultant, serving on committee board and the football department in a part-time role.

Harley later also joined the Australian Institute of Sport-AFL Academy as an assistant coach and mentor. Prior to the 2010 AFL season, it was further announced that Harley would join the Channel 7 football commentary team, replacing Nathan Buckley in the leading special comments role. Harley admitted that his previous experience as a regular panellist on the football program One Week at a Time during his playing days had fuelled an interest in working within the media industry.

He was the general manager of football at the Sydney Swans and before becoming CEO in 2019.

In October 2025, Harley assumed the role of COO of the AFL.

== Player profile ==
During his playing career, Harley was considered as one of the league's "most respected players" and the "general of the most miserly defence in the league". Harley began his early career as a key position player at centre half back, where he used his physical size to great effect. However, during his later years he played as a floating defender capable of playing on small forwards. Despite his personal admission to not being "the greatest player", Harley's play-reading ability saw him recognised as one of the league's best at intercepting opposition passes inside his defensive 50 metre arc.

He led with great dignity and a commitment to the common cause. He did not give Geelong its brilliance. Rather, his gift was to enable that brilliance to flourish on terms that were completely understood by every footballer in a blue-and-white hooped jumper.

— Stephen Rielly

Harley's leadership skills have been consistently praised during his time in the league. Despite his reputation for not being the team's greatest player, he was widely regarded as a natural leader whose character "was the heartbeat of Geelong". Teammate Gary Ablett complimented Harley as being "very approachable ... [and] the key to gelling the team together". Many commentators have attributed his leadership influence as being a key factor in Geelong's premiership success. Specifically, he was credited with helping transform the culture of the club, in setting standards for on and off-field behaviour. Harley's legacy as captain of the club was pronounced by Bill McMaster as being one of the great leaders of Geelong alongside Reg Hickey and Fred Flanagan.

== Personal life ==
Harley is the second of three children and has two brothers, one older, one younger. He is married to Sydney-based journalist Felicity Percival, whom he met while being interviewed for an article in Cosmopolitan. They have two sons.

After starting his Bachelor of Commerce degree at the University of Adelaide in 1996, Harley transferred to Deakin University and graduated 11 years later in 2007. Harley was one of 21 players from the Geelong Football Club who witnessed the 2002 Bali bombings first-hand during an off-season holiday to the popular tourist destination. Harley and his teammates were preparing to venture to the Sari night club just moments prior to the terrorist attack.

In 2008, Harley was named an ambassador for an anti-booze-fuelled violence campaign run by the Geelong Advertiser newspaper, titled "Just Think". As part of his ambassadorial role, Harley has appeared in numerous advertisements alongside fellow Geelong teammates and ambassadors James Kelly and David Wojcinski. He is an active health ambassador for Barwon Health.

In 2009, Harley's position as captain of the Geelong Football Club saw him participate in the inaugural Captains' Forum. He was selected as one of 24 leaders in Australian sport to discuss and develop a national response at Parliament House, Canberra, for emerging challenges impacting sport and the broader community.

== Statistics ==
Legend
G	Goals	K	Kicks	D	Disposals	T	Tackles
B	Behinds	H	Handballs	M	Marks

Season	Team	No.	Games	Totals							Averages (per game)						
Season	Team	No.	Games	G	B	K	H	D	M	T	G	B	K	H	D	M	T
1998	Port Adelaide	27	1	1	0	1	0	1	0	0	1.0	0.0	1.0	0.0	1.0	0.0	0.0
1999	Geelong	37	9	0	0	59	19	78	27	7	0.0	0.0	6.6	2.1	8.7	3.0	0.8
2000	Geelong	37	23	0	0	175	69	244	75	24	0.0	0.0	7.6	3.0	10.6	3.3	1.0
2001	Geelong	37	22	3	1	154	84	238	81	20	0.1	0.0	7.0	3.8	10.8	3.7	0.9
2002	Geelong	2	22	3	4	201	89	290	94	21	0.1	0.2	9.1	4.0	13.2	4.3	1.0
2003	Geelong	2	14	0	0	126	70	196	69	14	0.0	0.0	9.0	5.0	14.0	4.9	1.0
2004	Geelong	2	25	0	0	221	108	329	132	32	0.0	0.0	8.8	4.3	13.2	5.3	1.3
2005	Geelong	2	13	2	1	91	45	136	64	16	0.2	0.1	7.0	3.5	10.5	4.9	1.2
2006	Geelong	2	13	0	0	88	71	159	60	18	0.0	0.0	6.8	5.5	12.2	4.6	1.4
2007	Geelong	2	17	1	0	134	100	234	92	19	0.1	0.0	7.9	5.9	13.8	5.4	1.1
2008	Geelong	2	25	1	0	169	209	378	126	28	0.0	0.0	6.8	8.4	15.1	5.0	1.1
2009	Geelong	2	14	1	0	84	98	182	60	26	0.1	0.0	6.0	7.0	13.0	4.3	1.9
Career			198	12	6	1503	962	2465	880	225	0.1	0.0	7.6	4.9	12.4	4.4	1.1

== Honours and achievements ==
Brownlow Medal votes
Season	Votes
1998	0
1999	0
2000	0
2001	0
2002	0
2003	2
2004	1
2005	0
2006	0
2007	2
2008	7
2009	0
Total	12

Team

- AFL Premiership (Geelong): 2007 (C), 2009 (C)
- McClelland Trophy (Geelong): 2007 (C), 2008 (C)
- SANFL Reserves Premiership (Norwood): 1998

Individual

- All-Australian: 2008 (VC)
- AFLPA Best Captain Award: 2008
- Captain of Geelong F.C.: 2007–2009
- Geelong F.C. Best Clubman Award: 2002, 2006, 2008
- Geelong F.C. Coach's Award: 2001
- Geelong F.C. Most Determined and Most Dedicated Player Award: 2000
- Geelong F.C. Community Champion Award: 2008
- South Australian State of Origin representative honours: 2007, 2008 (Captain)
- Legendary Performers Award: 2009

== See also ==
- List of Geelong Football Club individual awards and records
- List of Geelong Football Club captains
- List of Australian Football League premiership captains and coaches
