= Les Armstrong =

Australian rules footballer (1887–1964)

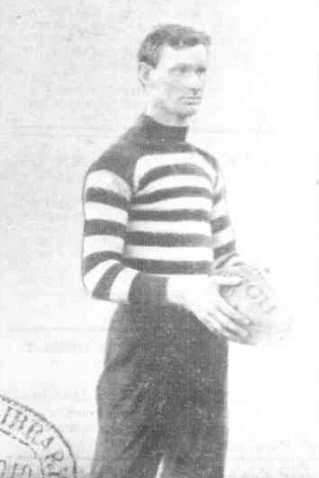
- Armstrong in 1910

Personal information
- Full name: James Leslie Armstrong
- Born: 16 June 1887; Geelong, Victoria
- Died: 4 December 1964 (aged 77); Frankston, Victoria
- Original team: Mercantile
- Height: 180 cm (5 ft 11 in)
- Weight: 72 kg (159 lb)

Playing career^{1}
Years	Club	Games (Goals)
1908–1920	Geelong	175 (2)
- ^{1} Playing statistics correct to the end of 1920.

James Leslie Armstrong (16 June 1887 – 4 December 1964) was an Australian rules footballer who played with Geelong in the Victorian Football League (VFL).

== Football ==
Armstrong, a defender, came to Geelong from the Mercantile Football Club. He was used mostly in the back pocket and as a half back flanker. Durable, he put together 91 consecutive games from 1909 to 1913.

== Military service ==
During World War II he served in the Volunteer Defence Corps, enlisting in Frankston in 1942.
