= Joe Slater =

Australian rules footballer

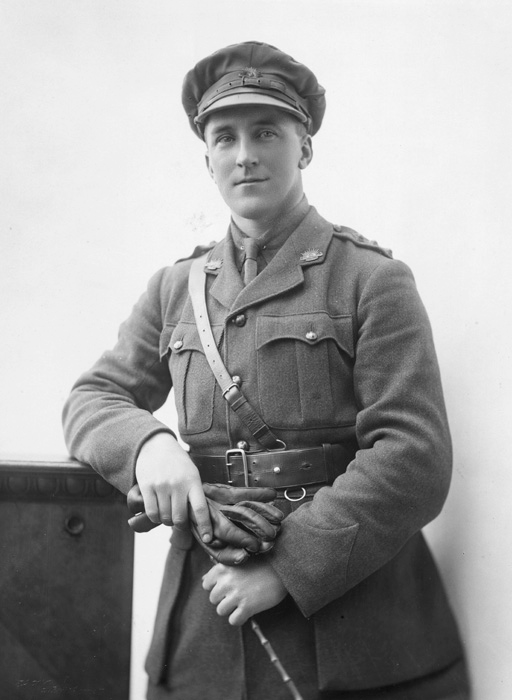

Personal information
- Full name: Joseph Henry Slater
- Born: 29 November 1888; Ballarat, Victoria
- Died: 3 May 1917 (aged 28); Bullecourt, France
- Original team: United Methodists
- Height: 179 cm (5 ft 10 in)
- Weight: 86 kg (190 lb)

Playing career^{1}
Years	Club	Games (Goals)
1906–1914	Geelong	108 (17)
- ^{1} Playing statistics correct to the end of 1914.

Joseph Henry Slater (29 November 1888 – 3 May 1917) was an Australian rules footballer who played with Geelong in the Victorian Football League.

== Family ==
The son of sharebroker Henry Slater (1837–1906), and Diana Slater (1854–1936), née Reynolds, Joseph Henry Slater was born in Ballarat, Victoria, on 29 November 1888. He was engaged to Nellie Jean Wigley (1885–1943); she never married, and she died in Elsternwick, Victoria, on 22 April 1943.

== Education ==
He was educated at Geelong College, where he was an outstanding cricketer, athlete, and footballer.

== Football ==
A non-smoker and non-drinker, and an accomplished sprinter, Slater usually played as a defender, with stints in the midfield and up forward. An all-round sportsman, Slater made 101 for Geelong 'B' against Kardinia in the First Eleven match in the G.C.A. season 1909/10.

He was named as a half-back flanker in Geelong's official Team of the Century. Good overhead, Slater twice represented Victoria at interstate football.

On 15 June 1912, Slater kicked a drop kick goal at Richmond's Punt Road Oval from the centre; it was measured at 85 yards (approx. 77.5 metres).

Due to work commitments in Melbourne in 1913, Slater intended to play with VFL team University; however, he played several matches with Hawthorn in the Metropolitan Amateur Football Association (MAFA); and, when playing against Collingwood District on 3 May 1913, he dislocated his collar bone, and he refused to leave the ground so his team wouldn't be one man short. Slater eventually returned to Geelong that year. Former League Champion of the late 19th and early 20th Centuries Peter Burns wrote of Slater in 1940:

"I turn to the possibilities of a man who, had he been spared, would have revolutionised Australian Football and gone down as the greatest player our game has produced – Joe Slater. Slater was nearing his prime when he was cut down in World War 1. He was just on the verge of super championship class when duty called him. He never came back. He was a big strong fellow. Higher than 6ft about 13 stone of hard sinew and muscle – but, as a mover an antelope. His pace was phenomenal. He was a champion runner. Yet, despite his size and his great pace, he could swing and balance like a rover."

== Military service ==
He left football at the outbreak of World War I in order to enlist; he was Captain of the 22nd Battalion, and he lost his life during the conflict in Bullecourt, France.

"In May 1917 he was leading his company in an operation at Bullecourt when he was hit by shrapnel, but on the way to a dressing station he was caught by machine-gun fire which killed him instantly. Although men went out to look for his body the following night, nothing was found except one of his boots. To this day he has no known grave."

According to Main and Allen (2002, p. 178):

"News of Slater's death precipitated overwhelming grief in Geelong and fans on their way to a match at Corio Oval turned back after word passed from mouth to mouth of their hero being reported "killed in action". Geelong players the following week wore black crepe armbands for a match against Richmond."

== See also ==
- List of Victorian Football League players who died on active service
