= Michael Turner (Australian rules footballer) =

Australian rules footballer (1954–2024)

Personal information
- Full name: Michael Turner
- Born: 6 December 1954
- Died: 30 December 2024 (aged 70)
- Original team: Warrnambool (HFL)
- Height: 183 cm (6 ft 0 in)
- Weight: 77 kg (170 lb)

Playing career^{1}
Years	Club	Games (Goals)
1974–1988	Geelong	245 (285)
- ^{1} Playing statistics correct to the end of 1988.

Michael Turner (6 December 1954 – 30 December 2024) was an Australian rules footballer who played 245 games for the Geelong Football Club in the Victorian Football League (VFL) from 1974 to 1988.

== Biography ==
Turner grew up in Warrnambool, Victoria and completed his final years of high school at Monivae College in Hamilton.

He followed in the footsteps of his father, Leo Turner (1928–1997), in representing Geelong and played as a wingman and half-forward. He was an All-Australian in 1979 and captained the club for three seasons between 1984 and 1986. In 1982, he was Geelong's leading goalkicker with 40 goals.

In 1989, Turner signed on as captain-coach of Werribee in the Victorian Football Association. In 1995, he was appointed by AFL Victoria to be the regional manager for the Geelong Falcons, responsible for the development of junior talent in the area. In 2014, he completed his 20th year in the job, having helped make the Falcons one of the highest-regarded junior development programs in Australia.

Turner was named a wingman in Geelong's official 'Team of the Century'.

In early 2023, he revealed that he had been diagnosed with pancreatic cancer. He died on 30 December 2024, at the age of 70.
