= Fred Flanagan =

Australian rules footballer

Personal information
- Full name: Fred Flanagan
- Born: 28 March 1924; Swan Hill, Victoria
- Died: 14 January 2013 (aged 88)
- Height: 187 cm (6 ft 2 in)
- Weight: 92 kg (203 lb)

Playing career^{1}
Years	Club	Games (Goals)
1946–1955	Geelong	163 (182)

Representative team honours
Years	Team	Games (Goals)
	Victoria	21 (13)
- ^{1} Playing statistics correct to the end of 1955.

Career highlights
- Geelong premiership captain 1951, 1952; Geelong Team of the Century; Carji Greeves Medal 1949; Geelong captain 1951–1954; Geelong leading goalkickers 1954; Australian Football Hall of Fame, inducted 1998

Fred Flanagan (28 March 1924 – 14 January 2013) was an Australian rules footballer in the (then) Victorian Football League (VFL).

Flanagan was a centre half-forward from Swan Hill. He played his whole career with Geelong Football Club.

In 1998 Flanagan was inducted into the Australian Football Hall of Fame.

Flanagan died on 14 January 2013, aged 88. In response to his death, the CEO of the Geelong Football Club, Brian Cook, said Flanagan "was a great man and a great Geelong man (...) [who] loved the club and the people that made up the club".

== Career highlights ==
Playing career:

- Geelong 1946–55 (Games: 163 Goals: 182)

Player honors:

- 2nd Brownlow Medal 1950
- Geelong best and fairest 1949
- Geelong leading goalkicker 1954
- Geelong captain 1951–1953
- Geelong premierships 1951 (captain), 1952 (captain)
- Geelong Team of the Century
- Victorian representative 21 matches (21 games, 13 goals).
