= Ablett family =

Prominent Australian rules football family

- Current region: Victoria, Australia
- Origin: Victoria, Australia
- Members: Fred; Len; Geoff; Kevin; Gary Sr. Ryan; Luke; Gary Jr. Nathan; Michael; Alf Williamson; Michael Tuck; Shane Tuck; Travis Tuck
- Connected families: Tuck, Williamson

The Ablett family is one of the most prominent families in Australian rules football, with many members playing in the Victorian Football League/Australian Football League.

== Family members ==
FRED ABLETT – The first family member with the surname Ablett to play Australian Rules Football was Frederick (Fred) William Ablett (born in 1883), he played 56 games in the WAFL from 1906 to 1910. He played for North Fremantle from 1906 to 1908, Midland Junction in 1909, and then returned to North Fremantle in 1910.

ALF WILLIAMSON – Alf Williamson was the first VFL player related to the family. He played 11 games for Carlton from 1912 to 1914, and 8 games for Melbourne in 1914. Nicknamed Lofty, he was killed in action in World War I in 1917.

LEN ABLETT – The first family member with the surname Ablett to play in the VFL/AFL was Len Ablett. Born in 1916, he played for Richmond from 1939 to 1943, winning a premiership in his final game in the VFL. He played 70 games for Richmond before returning to play and coach for Myrtleford Football Club. He was later the club president and is a member of the Ovens & Murray Football League Hall of Fame.

GEOFF ABLETT – The next to make their mark in the VFL were three brothers – Geoff, Kevin and Gary – sons of Alf Ablett, who was Len's first cousin. In a career which started in 1973 with Hawthorn before a stint with Richmond, and ended with St Kilda in 1985, Geoff played 229 games for 163 goals, Geoff played in the 1976 and 1978 premiership sides.

KEVIN ABLETT – Kevin made his VFL debut in 1977 with Hawthorn and played with Richmond and Geelong before his last game in 1985, Kevin played 38 games in the VFL.

GARY ABLETT SR. – By far the most prominent of the three brothers was Gary. He played for Hawthorn in 1982 where he played 6 games during his time there, scoring 9 goals. He then moved to Geelong for the 1984 season. He stayed at Geelong until 1996, playing 242 games and scoring 1021 goals. He finished his career as the fifth highest-scoring player in VFL/AFL history 1030 goals. In 2019 Gary Ablett's goal tally was amended when it was discovered that he kicked actually kicked 2 goals in round 5 1982, (his second match at Hawthorn). His tally now stands at 1031 goals (10 Hawthorn, 1021 Geelong)

LUKE ABLETT – Kevin's son Luke played 133 games for Sydney from 2001 to 2009, kicking 39 goals. Luke played in the 2005 premiership side

GARY ABLETT JR. – Gary Sr. had two sons who played AFL football – Gary Jr. and Nathan. Gary Jr. played for Geelong from 2002 to 2010, playing 192 games and scoring 262 goals. Gary played in the 2007 and 2009 premiership sides. In 2011, Gary moved to join the inaugural team at Gold Coast; named as captain, Gary played 110 games and scored 124 goals. Gary returned to Geelong at the start of 2018; he played a further 55 games and kicked a further 59 goals. Gary ended his career playing in the 2020 AFL Grand Final. Gary's career stats are 357 games, 445 goals, 2 premierships, and 2 Brownlow medals.

NATHAN ABLETT – Nathan joined Geelong in 2005, playing alongside his brother for three seasons before retiring. He had played 32 games, scoring 46 goals. Nathan played in the 2007 premiership side. He made a brief comeback in 2011 with Gold Coast, once again joining his brother, playing 2 games and scoring 1 goal before being delisted.

RYAN ABLETT – Geoff's son Ryan was on Hawthorn's rookie list for at least 2000, but he left the club without having played an AFL game. After playing for Port Melbourne in the Victorian Football League, East Fremantle in the West Australian Football League and West Adelaide in the South Australian National Football League, he died in his sleep from an undiagnosed heart condition on 28 March 2009, aged 27.

MICHAEL ABLETT – Another Ablett, from this generation, is Michael, (son of Lenny who is Geoff, Kevin & Gary's brother) was on North Melbourne's rookie list for at least 2000 but never made his AFL debut.

MICHAEL TUCK – Michael Tuck became an extended member of the Ablett clan when he married Fay, sister of Geoff, Kevin and Gary Sr. Michael played 426 games for Hawthorn, scoring 320 goals in a lengthy career which lasted from 1972 to 1991. Michael played in 7 premiership sides (1976, 1978, 1983, 1986, 1988, 1989, 1991) He held the record for most VFL/AFL games in history.

SHANE TUCK – Michael, like Gary Ablett Sr., had two sons who played senior AFL football. Shane was listed with Hawthorn from 2000 to 2002, without playing a game. He then signed for Richmond in 2004, where he stayed until 2013, having played 173 games and scored 72 goals. He died 20 July 2020 age 38, the Australian Sports Brain Bank stated that Tuck had suffered from a severe case of the degenerative brain disease chronic traumatic encephalopathy.

TRAVIS TUCK – Travis played for Hawthorn from 2006 to 2009, playing 20 games and scoring one goal.

The Ablett family collective AFL stats – 1747 games, 2074 goals, 14 premierships, 1 Norm Smith medal, 2 Brownlow medals, 7 times club best and fairest, 7 Coleman medals, 12 times club's leading goal kicker, 14 years as club captain, 19 times All-Australian.

== Extended family tree ==
Robert*
Thomas*	William*
George*	Fred
Norman*	Henry*	Lillian Williamson*	Reuben Williamson*
Len	Alfred*	Alf Williamson
Lenny*	Geoff	Kevin	Gary Sr.	Fay*	Michael Tuck
Michael	Ryan	Luke	Gary Jr.	Nathan	Shane Tuck	Travis Tuck

An asterisk denotes that the family member was never VFL/AFL or WAFL-listed. Non-VFL/AFL-listed family members were not included in the family tree unless they were necessary to provide a connection between family members. When the family member's surname is not stated, their surname is Ablett.
