= Ablett =

Ablett is a surname. Notable people with the surname include:

- Alfred Ablett (1830–1897), English recipient of the Victoria Cross
- Carl Ablett (born 1985), English rugby league player
- Gary Ablett Sr. (born 1961), Australian footballer
- Gary Ablett (1965–2012), English footballer
- Gary Ablett Jr. (born 1984), Australian footballer
- Geoff Ablett (1955–2026), Australian rules footballer
- Kevin Ablett (1958–2025), Australian footballer
- Len Ablett (1916–2006), Australian footballer
- Leslie Ablett (1904–1952), British water polo player
- Luke Ablett (born 1982), Australian footballer
- Nathan Ablett (born 1985), Australian footballer
- Noah Ablett (1883–1935), Welsh trade unionist and political theorist
- Ablett family, family of Australian rules footballers
