= Gary Ablett =

Gary Ablett may refer to:

- Gary Ablett Sr. (born 1961), Australian rules footballer, father of Ablett Jr.
- Gary Ablett Jr. (born 1984), Australian rules footballer, son of Ablett Sr.
- Gary Ablett (English footballer) (1965–2012), association footballer

== See also ==
- Ablett family
- Ablett
