= Shane Tuck =

Australian rules footballer (1981–2020)

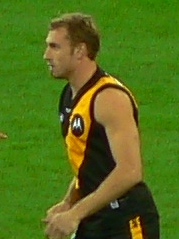
- Tuck with Richmond in May 2007

Personal information
- Born: 24 December 1981; Victoria, Australia
- Died: 20 July 2020 (aged 38)
- Original team: Dandenong Stingrays (TAC Cup)
- Draft: No. 24, 2000 rookie draft No. 73, 2003 national draft
- Height: 190 cm (6 ft 3 in)
- Weight: 92 kg (203 lb)
- Position: Midfielder

Playing career^{1}
Years	Club	Games (Goals)
2004–2013	Richmond	173 (74)
- ^{1} Playing statistics correct to the end of 2013.

Career highlights
- Jack Titus Medal (2nd RFC B&F): 2008; 2× Maurie Fleming Medal (3rd RFC B&F): 2005, 2007; Fred Swift Medal (4th RFC B&F): 2012; Kevin Bartlett Medal (5th RFC B&F): 2010

Shane Tuck (24 December 1981 – 20 July 2020) was an Australian rules footballer who played 173 matches for the Richmond Football Club in the Australian Football League (AFL) after also spending two years on the AFL list at Hawthorn without making an AFL appearance. Tuck was a life member at Richmond and placed in the top 10 of the club's "best and fairest" award in seven of his ten seasons at Richmond. His father is seven-time Hawthorn premiership player Michael Tuck.

== Early life and junior football ==
Tuck played junior football at Beaconsfield in the suburbs of Melbourne, and played representative football with the Dandenong Stingrays in the TAC Cup. In his draft-age year in 1999, Tuck also played with the Hawthorn reserves side in the AFL reserves competition.

== Playing career ==
=== Hawthorn (2000–2001) ===
After being overlooked by the club as a potential father–son rule selection at the 1999 national draft, Tuck was offered a rookie contract opportunity when selected by Hawthorn with the club's second selection and 24th pick overall in the 2000 rookie draft. He spent two seasons at Hawthorn without earning an AFL debut, instead playing reserves grade football with the club's VFL affiliate, the Box Hill Hawks. At the end of the 2001 AFL season, Tuck was delisted by Hawthorn.

=== Local and state-league football (2002–2003) ===
Tuck played local football in the Mornington Peninsula League in 2002, before moving to South Australia to play with West Adelaide in the SANFL in 2003, where he began attracting the attention of AFL scouts.

=== Richmond (2004–2013) ===
Tuck was drafted by Richmond with the club's six pick and the 73rd pick overall in the 2003 AFL draft. After spending much of the year playing reserves football with the club's VFL-affiliate Coburg, Tuck made his AFL debut in Round 14 of the 2004 AFL season.

In 2005, Tuck had a stellar season and played all 22 games Richmond were involved in. He finished third in the club's best and fairest award that year.

Tuck placed 10th in the club's best and fairest in 2006, third in 2007, and second in 2008. Tuck missed playing in Round 17, 2009, ending a 104-game streak of consecutive games since playing in Round 1, 2005. He placed seventh in the club's best and fairest in 2009.

In Round 6 2010, Tuck collected a career-best 28 disposals in a match against Geelong. A month later he set a new club record with 14 tackles in a match against Port Adelaide in Round 10. That year he placed fifth in the club's best and fairest count.

After the 2011 season, Tuck informed the club of his decision to retire, but he was talked into recommitting to the club for at least one further season.

In Round 12 in 2012, he collected a club record 23 contested possessions, a feat which he equalled six weeks later in Round 18. In 2012, Tuck placed fourth in the club's best and fairest count. He set new records that year for the most contested possessions (298) and most tackles (124) in a single season by any Richmond player in the club's history. Both records stood for five years until broken by former teammates Dustin Martin and Trent Cotchin, respectively, in 2017. At the end of the year, he was awarded life membership at Richmond.

Tuck suffered a fractured scapula in May 2013 that saw him miss two months of football. Following four weeks of reserves football, Tuck made a return to AFL football for the later part of the season before announcing he would retire at season's end.

Tuck featured in the club's first finals match in 12 years when Richmond earned an elimination final berth against Carlton in 2013. He was the substitute player for Richmond during that match but played almost the full match when brought on to replace Reece Conca after the latter suffered a hamstring injury just 10 minutes into the game.

Tuck retired following the 2013 season after 173 games over 10 seasons with Richmond.

== AFL statistics ==
Legend
G	Goals	K	Kicks	D	Disposals	T	Tackles
B	Behinds	H	Handballs	M	Marks

Season	Team	No.	Games	Totals							Averages (per game)						
Season	Team	No.	Games	G	B	K	H	D	M	T	G	B	K	H	D	M	T
2000	Hawthorn	38	0	—	—	—	—	—	—	—	—	—	—	—	—	—	—
2001	Hawthorn	38	0	—	—	—	—	—	—	—	—	—	—	—	—	—	—
2004	Richmond	21	3	1	0	21	16	37	7	2	0.3	0.0	7.0	5.3	12.3	2.3	0.7
2005	Richmond	21	22	10	14	323	195	518	106	71	0.5	0.6	14.7	8.9	23.5	4.8	3.2
2006	Richmond	21	22	11	8	262	199	461	102	72	0.5	0.4	11.9	9.0	21.0	4.6	3.3
2007	Richmond	21	22	12	6	253	237	490	114	61	0.5	0.3	11.5	10.8	22.3	5.2	2.8
2008	Richmond	21	22	10	1	229	318	547	102	84	0.5	0.0	10.4	14.5	24.9	4.6	3.8
2009	Richmond	21	19	8	3	213	310	523	90	62	0.4	0.2	11.2	16.3	27.5	4.7	3.3
2010	Richmond	21	20	5	5	227	283	510	91	103	0.3	0.3	11.4	14.2	25.5	4.6	5.2
2011	Richmond	21	10	1	2	85	110	195	31	36	0.1	0.2	8.5	11.0	19.5	3.1	3.6
2012	Richmond	21	22	11	11	266	310	576	117	124	0.5	0.5	12.1	14.1	26.2	5.3	5.6
2013	Richmond	21	11	5	6	95	94	189	22	24	0.5	0.5	8.6	8.5	17.2	2.0	2.2
Career			173	74	56	1974	2072	4046	782	639	0.4	0.3	11.4	12.0	23.4	4.5	3.7

== Honours and achievements ==
- Jack Titus Medal (2nd place, Richmond B&F): 2008
- 2× Maurie Fleming Medal (3rd place, Richmond B&F): 2005, 2007
- Fred Swift Medal (4th RFC B&F): 2012
- Kevin Bartlett Medal (5th place, Richmond B&F): 2010
- Richmond life membership, awarded 2012

== Post-AFL life ==
In 2014, Tuck played local football for the Goodwood Saints Football Club in the South Australian Amateur Football League (SAAFL).

Tuck debuted in professional boxing in November 2015 at the Melbourne Convention and Exhibition Centre, being knocked out in the fourth round from an uppercut to the chin by Lucas Miller; he was carried out on a stretcher. He fought in five professional matches over a boxing career that lasted until August 2017, winning three, losing once and drawing on one other occasion.

== Personal life ==
Shane was the son of Hawthorn footballer and former-VFL/AFL games record holder Michael Tuck and older brother of former Hawthorn footballer Travis Tuck. He was the nephew of Geelong great Gary Ablett Sr. and former VFL footballers Geoff and Kevin Ablett. He was cousin to Geelong and Gold Coast players Gary Ablett Jr and Nathan Ablett. Tuck was married to wife Katherine and had two children, a boy and a girl.

Tuck died by suicide on 20 July 2020 at the age of 38. Richmond wore black armbands to honour his memory in their Round 8 match against Greater Western Sydney on 24 July 2020.

In January 2021, the Australian Sports Brain Bank stated that Tuck had had a severe case of the degenerative brain disease chronic traumatic encephalopathy.

In March 2023, Tuck's family, alongside former AFL players Darren Jarman and Jay Schulz, launched a class-action lawsuit in the Supreme Court of Victoria against the AFL and the Richmond, Port Adelaide, Hawthorn and Adelaide football clubs, with the plaintiffs alleging that the defendants failed to ensure proper concussion management during the plaintiffs' playing careers.
