= Gary Ablett Jr. =

Australian rules footballer (born 1984)

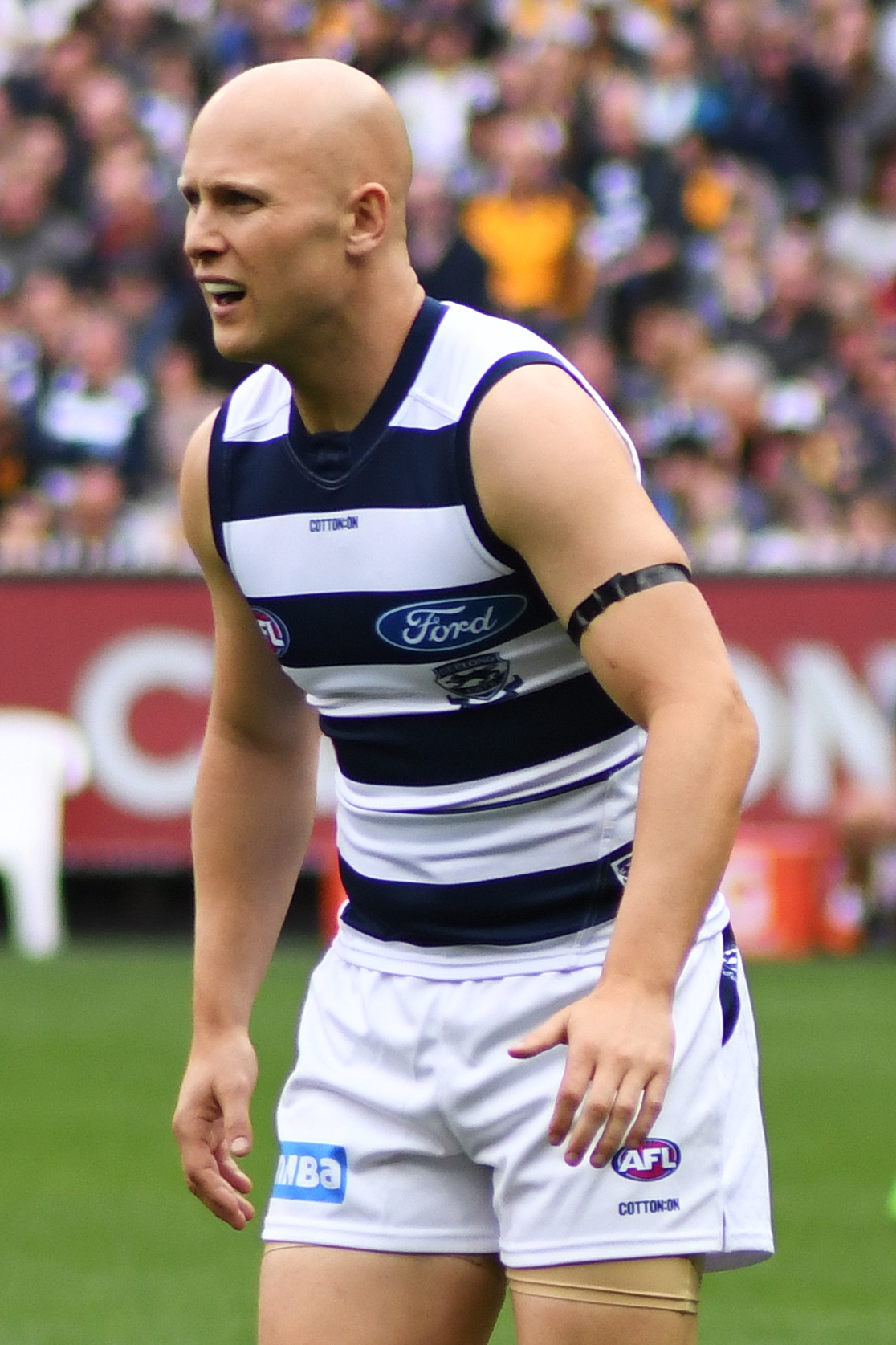
- Ablett playing for Geelong in 2019

Personal information
- Full name: Gary Robert Ablett Jr.
- Nicknames: Gaz, The Little Master
- Born: 14 May 1984 (age 42); Moriac, Victoria
- Original team: Geelong Falcons (TAC Cup)
- Draft: No. 40 (F/S), 2001 national draft
- Debut: Round 1, 2002, Geelong vs. Essendon, at the Melbourne Cricket Ground
- Height: 182 cm (6 ft 0 in)
- Weight: 87 kg (192 lb)
- Position: Midfielder / forward

Playing career
Years	Club	Games (Goals)
2002–2010	Geelong	192 (262)
2011–2017	Gold Coast	110 (124)
2018–2020	Geelong	55 (59)
Total		357 (445)

Career highlights
- Australian Football Hall of Fame (inducted 2026); 2× AFL premiership player: 2007, 2009; 2× Brownlow Medal: 2009, 2013; Gold Coast captain: 2011–2016; 5× Leigh Matthews Trophy: 2007, 2008, 2009, 2012, 2013; 3× AFLCA champion player of the year award: 2007, 2008, 2009; 8× All-Australian team: 2007, 2008, 2009, 2010, 2011 (c), 2012, 2013, 2014; 2× Carji Greeves Medal: 2007, 2009; 4× Gold Coast Suns Club Champion: 2011, 2012, 2013, 2017; Geelong leading goalkicker: 2006; 2× Gold Coast leading goalkicker: 2012, 2013; 2× Marcus Ashcroft Medal: 2012 (game 2), 2014 (game 1)

Gary Robert Ablett Jr. (born 14 May 1984) is a former professional Australian rules footballer who played for the Geelong Football Club and Gold Coast Suns in the Australian Football League (AFL). The eldest son of Australian Football Hall of Fame member and former Hawthorn and Geelong player Gary Ablett Sr., Ablett was drafted to Geelong under the father–son rule in the 2001 national draft and has since become recognised as one of the all-time great midfielders. Ablett is a dual premiership player, dual Brownlow Medallist, five-time Leigh Matthews Trophy winner, three-time AFLCA champion player of the year award winner and eight-time All-Australian.

During his first stint at Geelong, Ablett won two premierships, two Carji Greeves Medals, a Geelong leading goalkicker award and the 2009 Brownlow Medal. He is also a life member of the club and has been inducted into the club's Hall of Fame. At Gold Coast, Ablett was the club's inaugural captain, holding the role for the club's first six seasons, and won four Club Champion awards (including the first three in the club's history), two Gold Coast leading goalkicker awards and the 2013 Brownlow Medal, the first Brownlow Medal in the club's history. Between 2014 and 2018, Ablett suffered a number of setbacks due to injury; despite this, Ablett played 357 games, and he holds the VFL/AFL records for the most Brownlow Medal votes (262) and the most 3-vote games (55).

== Early life ==
Gary Ablett Jr. was born to Gary and Sue Ablett in the country town of Modewarre, outside the regional centre of Geelong, Victoria. As the eldest boy among four siblings, Ablett's childhood coincided with the peak of his father's footballing career. Along with his brother Nathan, Ablett would regularly attend his father's training sessions and weekly games. Geelong players regarded them as "barefooted pests in the rooms", and would often engage in kick-to-kick sessions with both of the boys. He attended Christian College Geelong during his schooling years.

Ablett played junior football with the Modewarre Football Club until he was chosen to play for the Geelong Falcons in the under-18 TAC Cup competition for the 2001 season. Ablett's selection was met with controversy, as some families of other prospective junior players felt Ablett was chosen on the basis of his famous family heritage rather than footballing merit. However, the Falcons' football manager Mick Turner repeatedly dismissed speculation. Nonetheless, as the son of a popular and famous football player from Geelong, Ablett attracted a large following even at junior level. Although he was still a bottom-aged player, Ablett received mid-year State honours for Victoria Country during the 2001 National Championships. After spending one year in the TAC Cup, Ablett entered his name into the 2001 AFL draft at the conclusion of the 2001 season.

== AFL career ==
=== First stint at Geelong (2002–2010) ===
==== Early years (2002–2006) ====
Ablett was drafted by Geelong with their fifth selection, and was the fortieth overall draft pick in the 2001 AFL draft under the father–son rule. Ablett made his senior debut for the club in the opening round of the 2002 AFL season, where he gathered 8 disposals and took 4 marks. Ablett made twelve senior appearances in total during the season, before spending the latter half of the year with the reserves team. Playing as a small forward, he helped the club's reserves team win the 2002 VFL premiership against Port Melbourne. After achieving premiership success with the reserves team in the previous year, Ablett established his position in the senior side the following season. Ablett alternated as a small forward and midfielder, scoring 26 goals and appearing in all of Geelong's senior fixtures during the 2003 AFL season. In round 2 in a loss against North Melbourne he received his first Brownlow vote, in a performance in which he registered 22 disposals and a goal. Ablett finished the year ranked first at the club for tackles (77) and inside 50s (89), as well as second for hard-ball gets (65). Following another season without participation in the finals series, Ablett and his teammates began their 2004 campaign with an appearance in the pre-season competition final against St Kilda. Geelong would qualify for its first finals series in four years, being eliminated in the preliminary final by the Brisbane Lions. Ablett made 21 appearances in total over the course of the season, and kicked a career-high 35 goals. He once again finished the year ranked first within the club for total tackles (93), and was awarded the club's Best Team and Most Constructive Player award at the end of the season.

The following year, Geelong again qualified for the finals series, progressing through to the semi-finals, before a three-point loss to Sydney ended their season. Ablett's consistency, reflected with his appearance in all senior games during the year and team-high 86 tackles, was rewarded with a third-place finishing in the Carji Greeves Medal as the club's best and fairest player. After consecutive appearances in the finals series, Ablett and Geelong were expected to challenge for the premiership once again in 2006. The club's 2006 campaign began successfully when they captured the pre-season NAB Cup, winning their first pre-season premiership since 1961. During the season, Ablett kicked a career-high six goals against Fremantle in round twelve, before making his 100th senior appearance for the club in round 22 against Hawthorn. However, the Cats only managed to win 10 games throughout the season and did not qualify for the finals series. Ablett finished the season with 35 goals to win the club's leading goalkicker award and once again place third in the Carji Greeves Medal.

==== First premiership and team success (2007–2008) ====
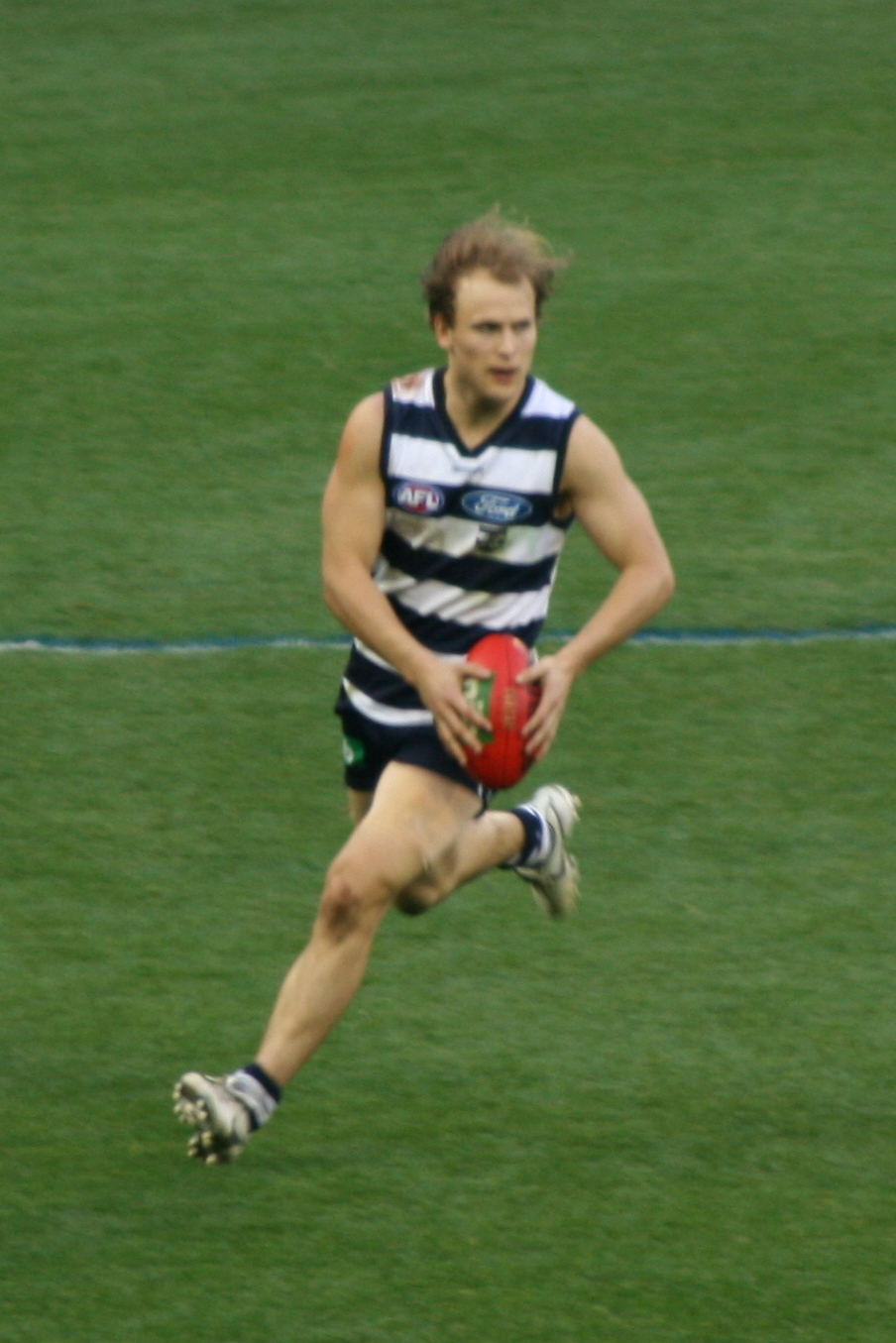
Ablett playing for Geelong in 2007

After playing his first five seasons as a small forward who occasionally pushed up the ground, Ablett made a permanent move to the midfield in 2007. He helped the Cats finish the home-and-away season first on the ladder to win the McClelland Trophy and qualify for the finals series. Geelong progressed through to the 2007 AFL Grand Final, in which they defeated Port Adelaide by a record 119 points to win their first premiership since 1963. Ablett recorded 19 disposals, one goal, and an equal game-high eight tackles in the grand final victory. Ablett played in all 25 games for the year and gained a number of individual accolades. After winning his first premiership, he also achieved All-Australian honours for the first time in his career. Despite being the favourite to win the 2007 Brownlow Medal, he finished equal-sixth with 20 votes behind teammate Jimmy Bartel on 29 votes. However, his breakthrough season was recognised by the AFL Players Association as they awarded him the Leigh Matthews Trophy as the league's most valuable player. Ablett also became the youngest ever recipient of the AFL Coaches' Association (AFLCA) 'Champion Player of the Year' Award and the Australian Football Media Association (AFMA) 'Player of the Year' Award. Ablett also claimed two of the major media awards; the Herald Sun Player of the Year and The Age Player of the Year awards. Ablett completed his sweep of individual awards when he was awarded the Carji Greeves Medal as Geelong's best and fairest player for the first time in his career. Ablett's breakthrough season was highlighted by his increased output in several major statistical categories: Ablett increased his disposal average to 26.7 (from 16.9 the previous season), kicks per game to 14.3 (from 10.1), and handpasses per game to 12.4 (from 6.8). He ranked first at the club and second within the league for total disposals (667) and total kicks (358), and also second for total handballs (309).

Ablett continued to establish his position as one of the premier players of the competition during the 2008 AFL season. He helped the Cats achieve a record-equalling 21-win season and secure the McClelland Trophy for the second successive year. His standout season was recognised early on when he was selected to play for the Victorian state team in the AFL Hall of Fame Tribute Match. However, a groin injury prevented him from participating in the all-star event. Having qualified for the finals series in the first position on the ladder, Geelong progressed through to the grand final for the second successive year; despite losing only one game during the home-and-away season, Geelong failed to capture the premiership as they were defeated by Hawthorn in the grand final. Ablett's performance in the final, during which he recorded a game-high 34 possessions, five tackles, eight inside 50s, and kicked an equal-team-high two goals, was recognised as he placed second in Norm Smith Medal voting for best afield in the grand final. Ablett featured in 21 games for the season and was awarded All-Australian honours for the second successive year. Despite entering the 2008 Brownlow Medal count as the favourite once again, Ablett tallied 22 votes to finish third behind Adam Cooney. However, Ablett's performances throughout the year were further recognised when he was awarded the AFLPA Leigh Matthews Trophy and AFL Coaches' Association 'Champion Player of the Year' awards for the second consecutive season. After increasing his disposal average once again to 28.9 possessions per game, Ablett finished runner-up for the Carji Greeves Medal to teammate Joel Corey. His 606 disposals ranked ninth in the league, while his 318 handpasses throughout the season ranked him fourth within the competition. Geelong coach Mark Thompson described Ablett's 2008 season as "amazing" and implied he was unsure if Ablett could improve any more. Thompson cited that he believed Ablett to be "at the top of his game".

==== First Brownlow Medal and second premiership (2009–2010) ====
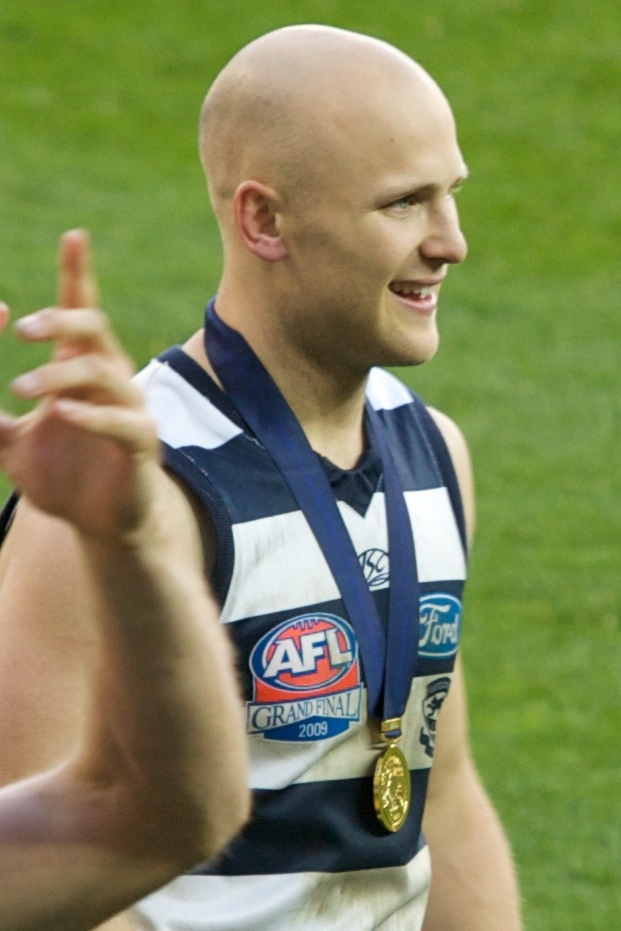
Ablett following the 2009 AFL Grand Final win

Ablett was appointed to the club's seven-man leadership group and inducted into the Geelong Football Club Hall of Fame prior to the 2009 AFL season. Following the 2008 AFL Grand Final loss, Thompson suggested that Ablett would become a more prominent player in the forward line to provide the team with another goal-scoring option. Ablett and his teammates began their 2009 campaign by winning the pre-season NAB Cup for the second time in four years. Ablett recorded 35 disposals and kicked three goals to place second for the Michael Tuck Medal as the player judged best afield in the final. In round four, Ablett made his 150th senior appearance for the club against Adelaide and gained life membership with Geelong in the process. Ablett went on to tie Nathan Buckley's then-record of 46 disposals in a game while also setting a new record for most handpasses in a game (33). Ablett's proficiency in finding the football saw him reach 40 or more disposals in a game a record six times throughout the season, and 30 or more disposals fifteen times. However, Ablett's critics accused him of playing selfishly in pursuit of individual honours ahead of team values. Commentators such as Tim Watson claimed that Ablett had "become obsessed with the whole idea of going out there and being the best player" in order to win the Brownlow Medal. Despite this, Ablett helped Geelong finish the home-and-away campaign with an 18–4 win–loss record to finish second on the ladder and qualify for the finals series. After wins against the Western Bulldogs and Collingwood, Geelong progressed through to the Grand Final for the third successive season. During the final, Ablett gathered 25 disposals, six tackles, five inside-50s, and kicked one goal to help the Cats defeat St Kilda by 12 points and capture the premiership for the second time in three years.

Ablett's performances throughout the season were recognised at the 2009 AFL Players Association awards, where he was awarded his third consecutive Leigh Matthews Trophy as the AFL Player's Association Most Valuable Player. Ablett's victory saw him become the first player in history to win the award three times. Ablett also won his third consecutive AFL Coaches' Association 'Champion Player of the Year' Award and was further acknowledged for his record-breaking season when awarded the 2009 Brownlow Medal. Ablett polled 30 votes to win the award despite missing the most games (3) by any Brownlow winner since the 22-round season was introduced in 1994. Ablett's role in Geelong's premiership-winning campaign was further recognised at the conclusion of the season, when he was co-awarded his second Carji Greeves Medal alongside Corey Enright. Ablett averaged a career-high and league-leading 33.8 possessions per game throughout the season. Ablett also led the league in total handpasses (445), handpasses per game (20.2) and contested possessions (256). His 744 total disposals during the season also ranked second within the league, while his 494 uncontested possessions ranked fourth.

After the 2009 season, and indeed at many points during the season, speculation continued to mount that Ablett would leave Geelong at the end of 2010 and join the AFL's newest team, Gold Coast. Despite the rumours, Ablett continued his own individual success, recording career-high totals in disposals (756), marks (106) and goals (44). Ablett would serve as the runner-up for several awards at the end of the home-and-away season, including the Carji Greeves Medal and Brownlow Medal. On 29 September, it was announced that Ablett would be joining Gold Coast in what was understood to be a multimillion-dollar deal.

=== Gold Coast (2011–2017) ===
==== Second Brownlow Medal and injury struggles (2011–2015) ====
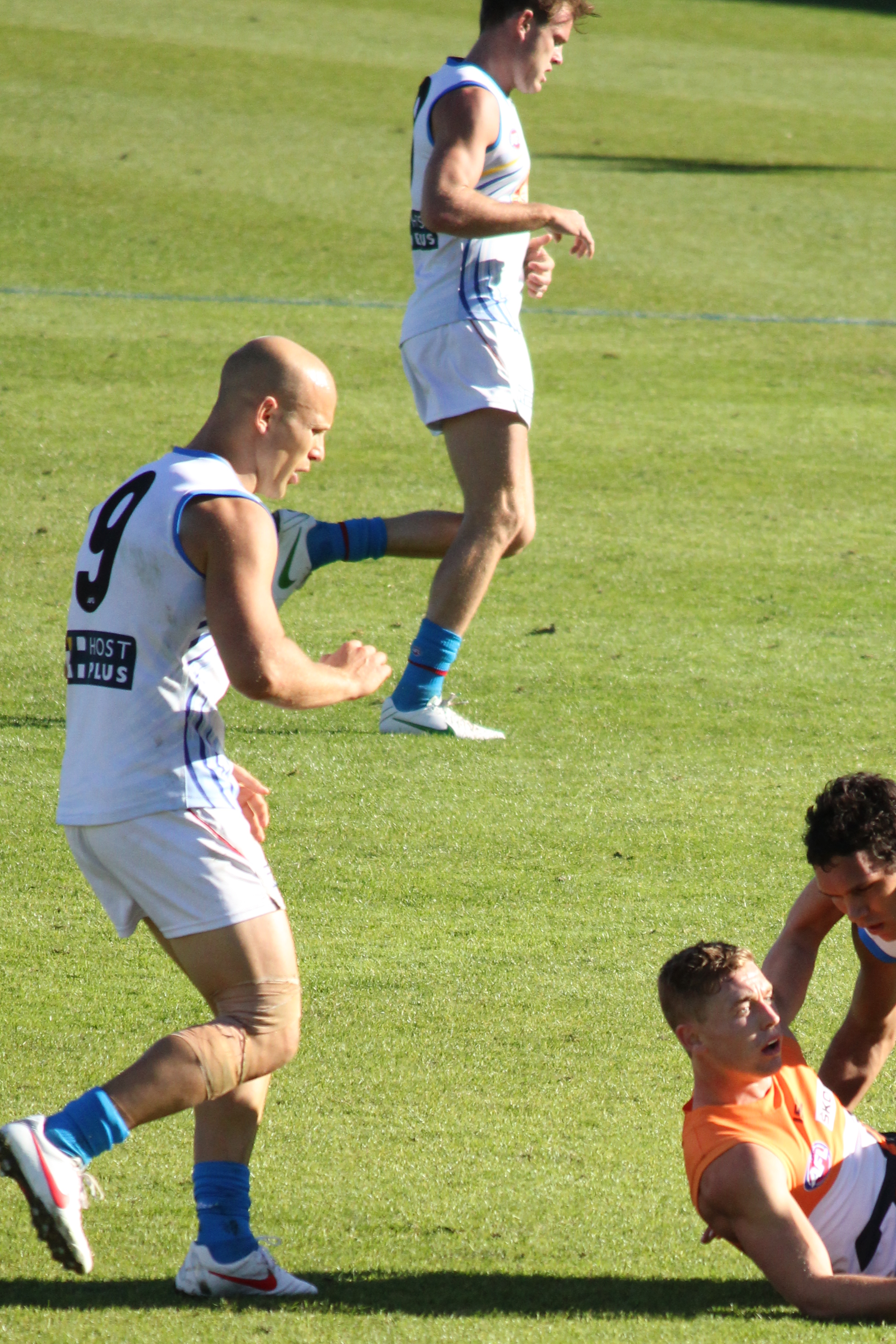
Ablett (left) playing for Gold Coast in 2012

On 29 September 2010, Ablett signed a five-year contract valued at $9 million with the Gold Coast Football Club, a side entering the AFL for the first time in 2011. On 19 January 2011, after much speculation, Ablett was named the inaugural AFL captain of the Suns. In the club's first AFL season, Gold Coast finished last on the ladder with a 3–19 win–loss record, meaning that Ablett missed out on playing in a final for the first time in five years; he still had a great individual season, finishing with career-highs in tackles (119) and clearances (133) and being named captain in the 2011 All-Australian team. In 2012, Ablett continued his individual success, winning his fourth Leigh Matthews Trophy and finishing the season with a career-high in kicks (389). In 2013, Ablett had a tremendous season, leading the league in average disposals (31.2) and taking home his second consecutive (and fifth overall) Leigh Matthews Trophy. He also won his second Brownlow Medal, becoming the first Gold Coast player to win the award and the 14th player in VFL/AFL history to win it twice. Ablett became the fifth player to win Brownlow Medals at different clubs, joining Ian Stewart, Peter Moore, Greg Williams and Chris Judd. Ablett had a career-best season in 2014, averaging 32 possessions and kicking 24 goals before suffering a season-ending shoulder injury in the Suns' win against Collingwood in round 16. Despite playing only 15 games, he finished equal-third in the Brownlow Medal with 22 votes.

Ablett's shoulder injury affected his 2015 preseason, but he took the field in the Suns' opening game against Melbourne. He scored two goals and had 19 disposals in the loss, then had 23 disposals and kicked one goal in the round 2 loss to St Kilda, but laid only one tackle across the two games. The shoulder was still causing problems, and the Suns' medical staff sidelined him indefinitely before the round 3 clash with Geelong. Dr Peter Larkins stated four weeks later that the status of Ablett's injury meant that he could "miss the majority of the season". By the end of May, Ablett began to draw criticism from media personalities such as Garry Lyon and Jonathan Brown for his supposed lack of leadership in the struggling Suns side. On top of their numerous losses, some Suns players were displaying poor discipline and Lyon considered Ablett was not doing enough to prevent off-field indiscretions. When he refused to discuss the issues with Lyon on Triple M, Lyon described Ablett as "immature". The following Monday on Fox Footy's on the Couch program, Jonathan Brown lashed Ablett for not taking the field, claiming he was cleared to play by Suns medicos and he should "play through the pain". Ablett addressed these criticisms with a press conference on 3 June saying it was not just an issue of pain and to return early would be "selfish". On AFL 360, Ablett's former coach Mark Thompson defended his decision not to play, stating that Ablett's high standards meant that he would not want to take the field if he could not give 100% effort. Ablett eventually returned for the round 14 game against North Melbourne; although starting quietly, he was instrumental in the win, gaining 31 disposals and kicking three goals. He continued to perform well in the next two games, racking up 30 disposals in each and kicking four goals, however he was struck down with a season-ending injury in round 17, suffering a medial ligament tear to the left knee in the first quarter of the Suns' loss to Adelaide. The recovery time required meant that he did not play again in the 2015 season.

==== Further injury struggles and trade requests (2016–2017) ====
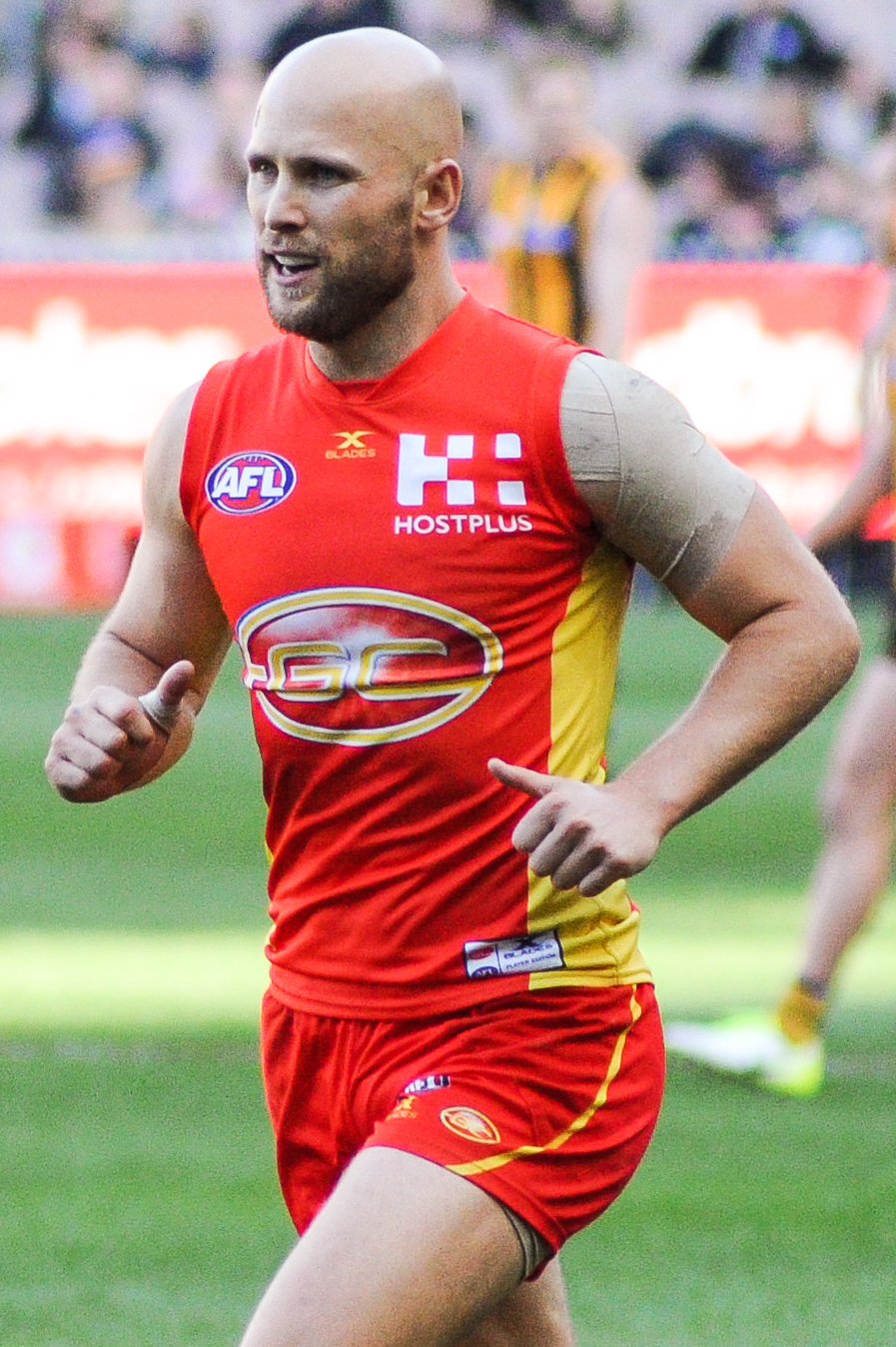
Ablett playing for Gold Coast in 2017

Ablett played 14 games for Gold Coast in 2016, averaging 27 disposals and six tackles per game. However, he suffered another season-ending shoulder injury during the round 16 win over Brisbane. He polled six votes in the 2016 Brownlow Medal, taking him to a total of 220 career votes, the equal-highest number in history to that point (alongside Hawthorn's Sam Mitchell). In addition he had by this point received votes in 103 games, placing him second on the list of total games in which votes were awarded to a single player. During the 2016 trade period, Ablett requested a trade back to Geelong for "family reasons." Ablett later stepped down as Suns' captain, stating he was unsure if he would play on after the 2017 season.

In the early rounds of the 2017 season, speculation about his commitment to the Suns escalated after the team lost the first two matches. He was criticised by experts such as Matthew Lloyd for his poor performance in the Suns' 102-point loss to Greater Western Sydney, who said Ablett needed to "suck it up" as he was no longer playing in the midfield and was now in forced to play in a position he did not enjoy. Following the 2017 AFL season, Ablett won his fourth Gold Coast Suns Club Champion award, despite playing only 14 games. He polled 14 votes in the 2017 Brownlow Medal count, taking him to outright second all-time career votes behind Gary Dempsey. By polling 3 votes in 3 rounds of the 2017 season, he became the first player to receive the maximum 3 votes in 50 matches.

On 26 September 2017, Gold Coast announced that Ablett had requested a trade back to Geelong. It was reported that Ablett was seeking a return home for "family reasons", and if no trade was forthcoming, he would quit football despite being contracted to play at Gold Coast until the end of 2018.

=== Second stint at Geelong (2018–2020) ===
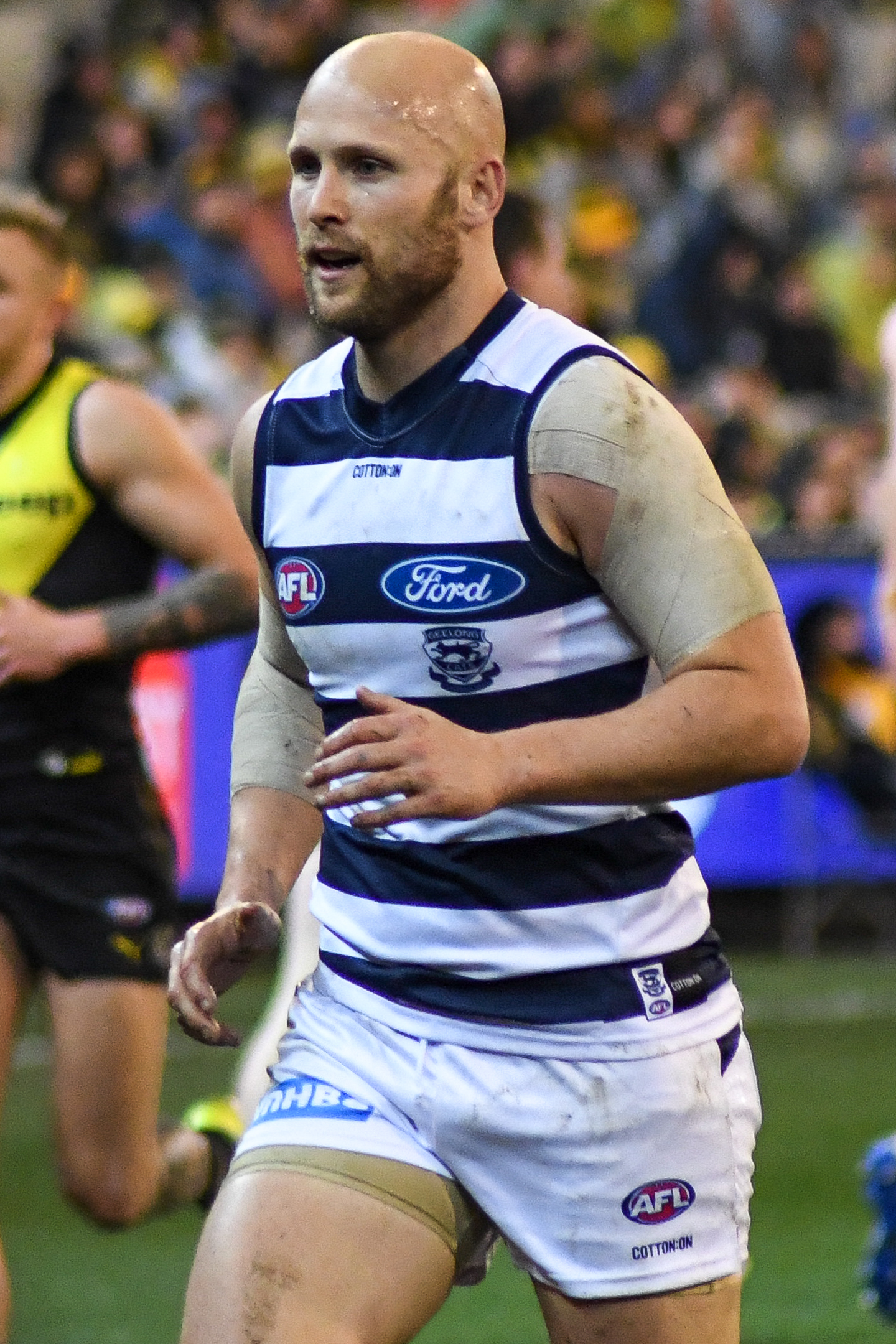
Ablett playing for Geelong in 2018

In October 2017, Ablett was traded back to Geelong. His 2018 preseason was impacted by injury followed by a significant injury in the Round 3 loss to West Coast. Upon his return, Ablett drew criticism from AFL media figures such as Wayne Carey, who believed that Ablett should not be played in the Cats' midfield. Following his return from injury, Ablett's form quickly improved, with a best on ground performance in the win over North Melbourne in Round 12 equalling Sam Mitchell's record of 121 games with 30 or more possessions.

After a strong start to the 2019 season, Ablett was offered a one-match suspension, which would have been the first of his career, after striking Essendon midfielder Dylan Shiel with a forearm to the head in the Cats' round 7 win; the club chose to appeal the suspension at the AFL Tribunal and was ultimately successful, maintaining Ablett's clean record. An almost identical incident occurred the following week involving North Melbourne utility Sam Wright, but Ablett was not penalised. A third incident followed a fortnight later, this time a punch to the jaw of Gold Coast midfielder Anthony Miles; he was again offered a one-match suspension, which the club chose to accept, meaning that Ablett was suspended for the first time in his career after 331 games to that point. After maintaining his good form upon his return, his best game for the year came in a best-on-ground performance round 23 against Carlton, when he accumulated 28 disposals and kicked three goals. At the end of the season, Ablett signed a one-year deal with Geelong, extending his AFL career into a nineteenth season, and announced that it would be his last.

Ablett played his 350th game in round 5 of the 2020 season against his former club, Gold Coast, in what was also Joel Selwood's 300th game; he kicked a goal in the final quarter among 14 disposals. He later left the Cats' Perth hub after round 7 to be with his wife and son after earlier revealing that his son had been diagnosed with a rare degenerative disease. After finding out that he would not be allowed to return to play until the final home-and-away round due to Queensland travel restrictions, Ablett joined two players in the AFL's Gold Coast quarantine hub in September, before returning in Geelong's win against Sydney in round 18. He was among the best afield in Geelong's preliminary final win against the Brisbane Lions at the Gabba, kicking two third-quarter goals among 14 disposals. Ablett played his final game in Geelong's 31-point loss to Richmond in the 2020 AFL Grand Final the following week; he injured his left shoulder in the opening minutes of the game but continued to play, with scans later revealing that he had played out the rest of the match with a broken shoulder.

== Other work ==
In 2009, Ablett appeared alongside other AFL footballers in an AFL television advertisement titled "AFL: In a League of its Own". The ad featured the players playing Australian rules football at famous sporting venues around the world, and in the middle of other sports being played, including basketball, soccer and American football. Ablett is featured in a scene evading cars in an international off-road rally driving event, before kicking the ball to Fremantle player Matthew Pavlich. The ad premiered on television on 22 March 2009.

== Personal life ==
Ablett is a member of what has been called the "Ablett dynasty", a group of footballers all descended from Alf and Colleen Ablett. Ablett's father, Gary Ablett Sr., and two of his uncles, Kevin and Geoff Ablett, played senior VFL football from the 1970s to the 1990s. His brother Nathan Ablett and cousin, Luke Ablett both played senior football in the 2000s and 2010s. In May 2012, it was noted that, all together, Ablett's family had played a total of 900 matches, with his immediate family (Ablett, his father, and his brother) having a combined total of 500 matches. Ablett's aunt, Fay Ablett, married Michael Tuck, who was up until the 2016 AFL premiership season the AFL's all-time games record holder, with whom she had two sons who also played league football: Shane and Travis Tuck. Ablett's great-uncle, Len Ablett, played in Richmond's 1943 premiership side.

Ablett dated Nine Network presenter Lauren Phillips for seven years, having first started dating after the 2002 grand final of the Victorian Football League. However, in early January 2010 it was confirmed the pair had ended their relationship. Ablett then dated Canadian former model Abby Boulbol. In August 2010, Lauren Phillips confirmed that she and Ablett were back together; however, in September 2012, their relationship ended after nine years together.

At the 2013 Brownlow medal ceremony, Ablett was accompanied by girlfriend Jordan Papalia. After a disappointing season in 2015 where injury kept him out of all but six games, Ablett announced his engagement to Papalia in July. On 1 January 2016, Ablett and Papalia were married in Coldstream, Victoria. The pair gave birth to a son in 2019. It was revealed in an interview in 2020 that the child has a "rare and degenerative disease". This caused Ablett to miss a significant part of the 2020 home and away season as the hub life nature of the COVID-interrupted season would not allow him to regularly be with his family. The couple had their second child a daughter, in November 2021. In January 2023, the couple announced Jordan was pregnant with their third child. Their second son, was born in July 2023.

Ablett is a committed Christian. In October 2017, during the trade window, while Ablett was pursuing a trade back to Geelong, his eldest sister Natasha died from a drug overdose at the age of 35.

== Statistics ==
Legend
G	Goals	K	Kicks	D	Disposals	T	Tackles
B	Behinds	H	Handballs	M	Marks
#	Played in that season's premiership team	†	Led the league for the season	±	Won that season's Brownlow Medal

Season	Team	No.	Games	Totals							Averages (per game)							Votes
Season	Team	No.	Games	G	B	K	H	D	M	T	G	B	K	H	D	M	T	Votes
2002	Geelong	29	12	10	3	37	63	100	13	25	0.8	0.3	3.1	5.3	8.3	1.1	2.1	0
2003	Geelong	29	22	26	20	189	138	327	61	77	1.2	0.9	8.6	6.3	14.9	2.8	3.5	3
2004	Geelong	29	21	35	25	178	123	301	46	93	1.7	1.2	8.5	5.9	14.3	2.2	4.4	3
2005	Geelong	29	24	29	26	257	178	435	65	86	1.2	1.1	10.7	7.4	18.1	2.7	3.6	3
2006	Geelong	29	21	35	28	212	142	354	74	65	1.7	1.3	10.1	6.8	16.9	3.5	3.1	5
2007^{#}	Geelong	29	25	30	26	358	309	667	98	86	1.2	1.0	14.3	12.4	26.7	3.9	3.4	20
2008	Geelong	29	21	26	24	288	318	606	100	95	1.2	1.1	13.7	15.1	28.9	4.8	4.5	22
2009^{#}	Geelong	29	22	27	26	299	445^{†}	744	93	92	1.2	1.2	13.6	20.2^{†}	33.8^{†}	4.2	4.2	30^{±}
2010	Geelong	29	24	44	26	338	418	756	106	101	1.8	1.1	14.1	17.4	31.5	4.4	4.2	26
2011	Gold Coast	9	20	18	17	304	301	605	45	119	0.9	0.9	15.2	15.1	30.3	2.3	6.0	23
2012	Gold Coast	9	20	26	19	389	286	675	61	110	1.3	1.0	19.5	14.3	33.8	3.1	5.5	24
2013	Gold Coast	9	21	28	23	343	312	655	73	96	1.3	1.1	16.3	14.9	31.2^{†}	3.5	4.6	28^{±}
2014	Gold Coast	9	15	24	7	254	227	481	30	91	1.6	0.5	16.9	15.1	32.1	2.0	6.1	22
2015	Gold Coast	9	6	10	3	94	43	137	12	28	1.6	0.5	15.6	7.2	22.8	2.0	4.6	5
2016	Gold Coast	9	14	10	12	203	175	378	28	85	0.7	0.9	14.5	12.5	27.0	2.0	6.7	6
2017	Gold Coast	9	14	8	11	266	196	462	49	77	0.6	0.8	19.0	14.0	33.0	3.5	5.5	14
2018	Geelong	4	19	16	15	296	256	552	85	72	0.8	0.8	15.6	13.5	29.1	4.5	3.8	14
2019	Geelong	4	24	34	18	293	189	482	89	108	1.4	0.8	12.2	7.9	20.1	3.7	4.5	13
2020 (Note: The 2020 season was played with 17 home-and-away matches per team (down from 22) and 16-minute quarters with time on (down from 20-minute quarters with time on) due to the impact of the COVID-19 pandemic.)	Geelong	4	12	9	8	97	82	179	24	27	0.8	0.7	8.1	6.8	14.9	2.0	2.3	1
Career			357	445	337	4695	4201	8896	1152	1533	1.2	0.9	13.2	11.8	24.9	3.2	4.3	262

== Honours and achievements ==
- Australian Football Hall of Fame (inducted 2026)

Team

- 2× AFL premiership player (Geelong): 2007, 2009
- 3× McClelland Trophy (Geelong): 2007, 2008, 2019

Individual

- Gold Coast captain: 2011–2016
- 2× Brownlow Medal: 2009, 2013
- 5× Leigh Matthews Trophy: 2007, 2008, 2009, 2012, 2013
- 3× AFLCA Champion Player of the Year Award: 2007, 2008, 2009
- 8× All-Australian team: 2007, 2008, 2009, 2010, 2011 (c), 2012, 2013, 2014
- 2× Carji Greeves Medal: 2007, 2009
- 4× Gold Coast Suns Club Champion: 2011, 2012, 2013, 2017
- Geelong leading goalkicker: 2006
- 2× Gold Coast leading goalkicker: 2012, 2013
- 2× Marcus Ashcroft Medal: 2012 (game 2), 2014 (game 1)

== See also ==
- List of Australian rules football families
- Alf Williamson

== Notes ==
- Slattery, Geoff (2007). Geelong – The Greatest Team of All. Docklands, Victoria: Geoff Slattery Publishing Pty Ltd. pp. 18, 48, 81, 94. ISBN 978-0-9803466-9-5.
- Townley, Simon (2007). Year of the Cat – The Inside Story. Geelong: The Geelong Advertiser Pty Ltd. pp. 19, 33, 81, 101. ISBN 978-0-9592863-7-3.
- Gullan, Scott (2008). The Mission – The Inside Story of Geelong's 2007 AFL Premiership. Melbourne: Weston Media and Communications. pp. 71, 79, 139, 140, 141. ISBN 978-0-646-48985-8.
