= Gary Ablett Sr. =

Australian rules footballer (born 1961)

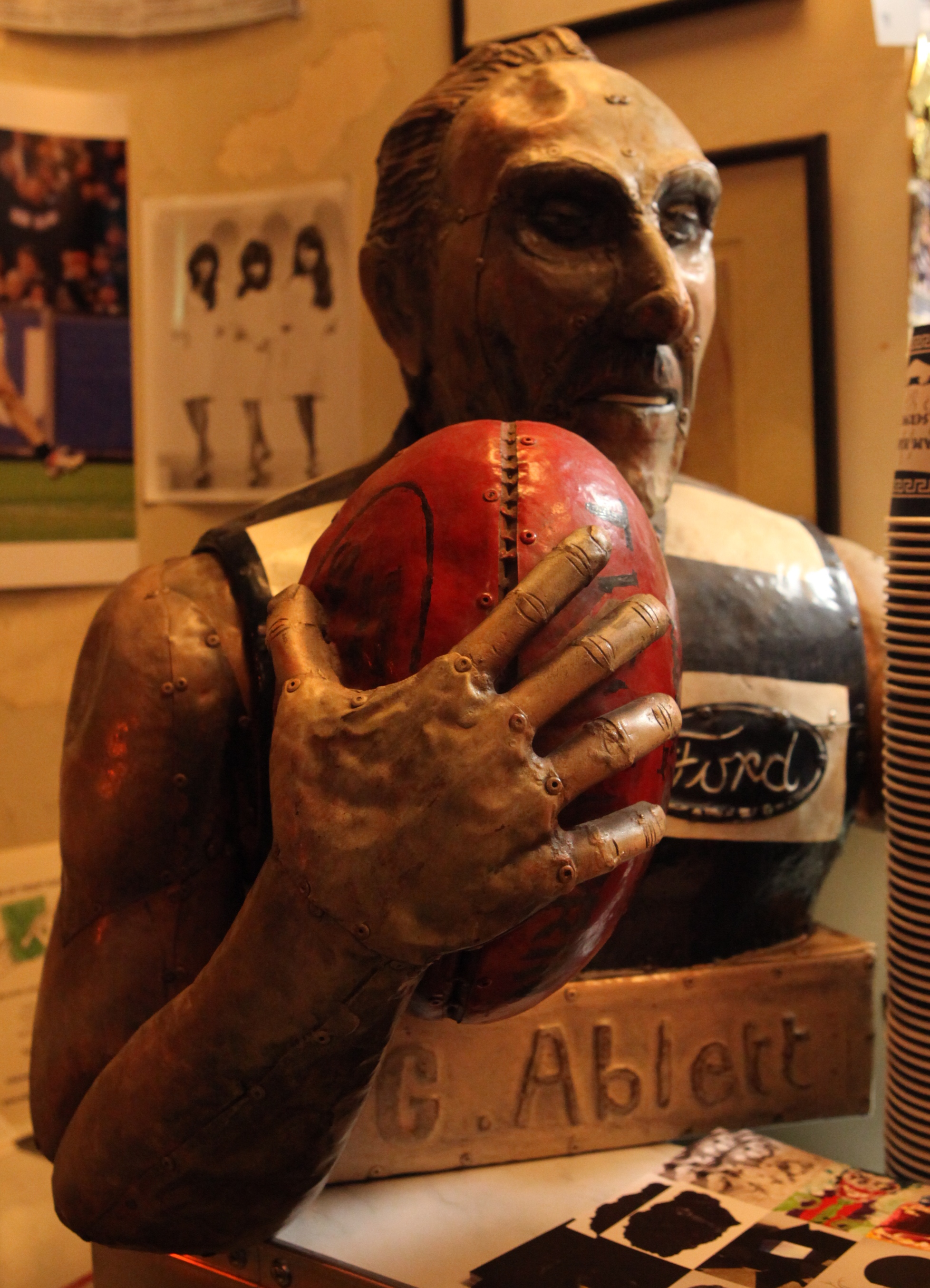
- Sculpture of Ablett by artist Stu James at an exhibition of football art

Personal information
- Full name: Gary Robert Ablett
- Nickname: God
- Born: 1 October 1961 (age 65); Drouin, Victoria
- Original team: Myrtleford/Drouin
- Debut: Round 2, 3 April 1982, Hawthorn vs. Geelong, at Princes Park
- Height: 185 cm (6 ft 1 in)
- Weight: 97 kg (214 lb)
- Position: Wing / half-forward flank / full-forward

Playing career^{1}
Years	Club	Games (Goals)
1982	Hawthorn	6 (10)
1984–1996	Geelong	242 (1021)
Total		248 (1031)

Representative team honours
Years	Team	Games (Goals)
1984–1995	Victoria	11 (43)
- ^{1} Playing statistics correct to the end of 1996.

Career highlights
- Norm Smith Medal: 1989; 3× Coleman Medal: 1993, 1994, 1995; Carji Greeves Medal: 1984; Leigh Matthews Trophy: 1993; 4× All-Australian team: 1992, 1993, 1994, 1995; 4× VFL/AFL Team of the Year: 1984, 1986, 1989, 1990; 9× Geelong leading goalkicker: 1985–1986, 1988–1990, 1993–1996; Geelong Football Club Greatest Ever Player Award; Geelong Team of the Century; Geelong Captain: 1995–1996; Geelong Mark of the Century: 1994; 2× Mark of the Year: 1985, 1994; Geelong Football Club Hall of Fame; Geelong Player of the National Era: 1984–1996; Australian Sports Medal: 2000; Norwich Union Centenary Medal: 2001; Captain of Victoria: 1995; Victoria Team of the 20th Century; AFL Team of the Century; Australian Football Hall of Fame, inducted 2005

Gary Robert Ablett Sr. (born 1 October 1961) is a former professional Australian rules footballer who represented Hawthorn and Geelong in the Australian Football League (AFL). Nicknamed "God", Ablett is widely regarded as one of Australian football's greatest players, and was especially renowned for his high-flying spectacular marks and his prolific goalkicking.

After playing for several country teams in and around his hometown of Drouin, Victoria, Ablett was recruited by Hawthorn and made his Victorian Football League (VFL) debut in 1982. However, he struggled to adjust to city life and retreated to Myrtleford the following year. The Geelong Football Club managed to lure him back to professional football in 1984, and by the late '80s, he had become one of the VFL's biggest stars. His 1989 VFL Grand Final appearance, during which he kicked a grand final record nine goals for a losing side (and tying the outright grand final record with Gordon Coventry), is regarded as one of football's greatest individual performances, earning him the Norm Smith Medal. At the beginning of the 1991 season, Ablett shocked the football world by abruptly announcing his retirement from the game, but he made a comeback midway through the year. He went on to appear in the 1992, 1994, and 1995 grand finals, before officially retiring on September 25, 1997.

Ablett's individual accolades and achievements include an induction into the Australian Football Hall of Fame, an AFL Team of the Century selection, the 1993 AFL Players Association MVP award (now known as the Leigh Matthews Trophy), and three Coleman Medals. He remains Geelong's all-time leading goalkicker, with 1021 goals; and, in 2006, was voted by past and present Geelong Football Club players as the greatest Geelong footballer of all time.

== Early life ==
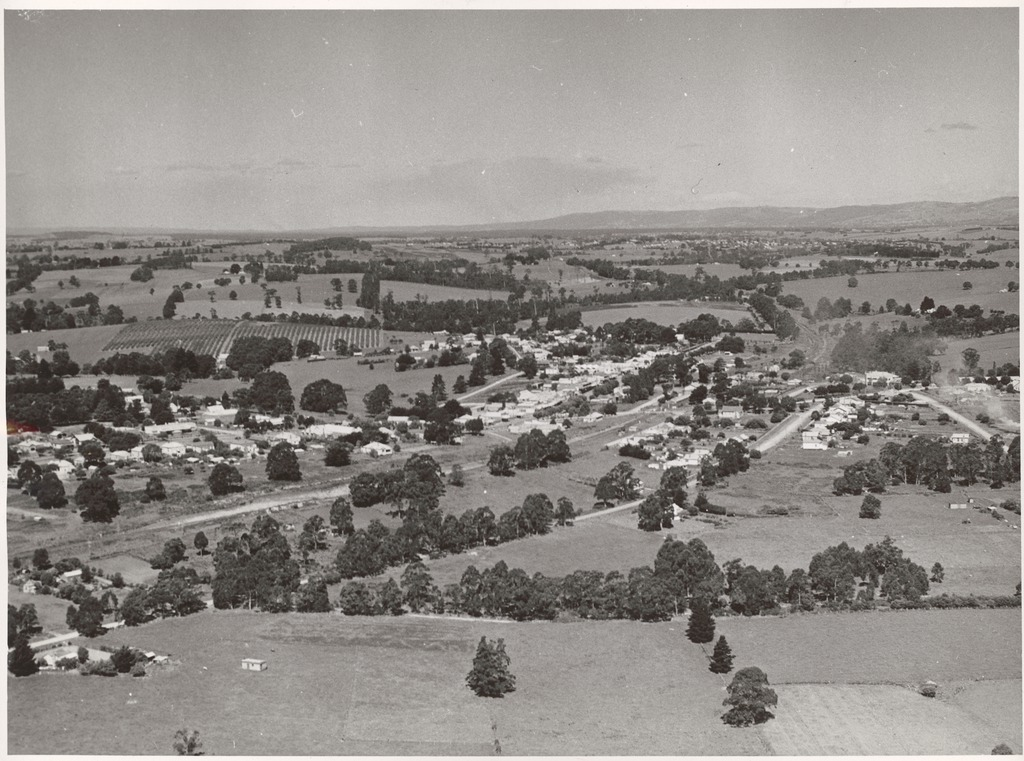
Drouin, Victoria, Ablett's hometown

Born in Drouin to Alfred and Colleen Ablett, Gary Ablett grew up in Gippsland, Victoria, alongside his four elder brothers and three sisters. Ablett displayed a love for sport at an early age, winning the state school high jump at 10 years of age. He was also awarded both club and competition best-and-fairest awards for Drouin at the under-11s, under-12s and under-14s levels.

After his interest waned in attending school, Ablett dropped out of high school at 15 to become a bricklayer. He also began to concentrate on his football and joined his brothers in the Drouin senior team at just 16 years of age. After appearing in several country league representative games, the Hawthorn Football Club, which had already signed Gary's elder brothers Geoff and Kevin onto their lists, invited him to play reserves football.

== Career ==
=== AFL ===
==== The Hawthorn experience (1981–1983) ====
After signing a reserves contract and featuring in six reserves games for Hawthorn, Ablett retreated back to his home in Drouin. He returned to Hawthorn in 1982 and made his senior VFL debut versus Geelong in Round 2, kicking 1 goal and helping the Hawks defeat the Cats by 19 points. He played a further five games for Hawthorn that year for a total of six games and ten goals. Ablett claimed difficulty coping with city life in Melbourne and his continual absenteeism from training sessions forced Hawthorn coach, Allan Jeans into parting ways with the talented, but wayward young half forward.

In 1983, he moved with his young family to the country town of Myrtleford. Ablett spent the year playing under the tutelage of his cousin Len Ablett for Myrtleford in the Ovens and Murray Football League. Ablett's footballing ability soon came on notice again, this time to the Geelong Football Club and their long-time recruiting officer Bill McMaster. McMaster convinced Ablett to give the game another shot, this time in the confines of the rural city of Geelong. After protracted negotiations with Hawthorn, Geelong finally paid a $60,000 transfer for Ablett in 1984.

==== The early years at Geelong (1984–1988) ====
Ablett signed a one-year contract for the 1984 season with Geelong, and he began his first season under the guidance of Tom Hafey. He debuted for the Cats in Round 1 and after just nine games on the wing, Ablett was selected to his first State of Origin game for Victoria. Ablett earned best-on-ground honours after kicking 8 goals from the half-forward flank. He played 15 games and kicked 33 goals in the 1984 season, and was awarded the Carji Greeves Medal as the Geelong Football Club's "best and fairest" player of the year. Following his first season with Geelong, Ablett signed a new three-year contract with the club.

Playing mostly on the half forward flank, Ablett won the club's goalkicking award for the following two seasons with 82 and 65 goals respectively. Although Ablett had developed a reputation for his laconic, lazy attitude to training under coach John Devine, this did not prevent him from earning top three placings in the best and fairest awards from 1985 to 1987.

With his contract expiring at the conclusion of the 1987 season, Ablett shocked the VFL by signing a new five-year contract with his former club, Hawthorn. After a "cooling-off" period, however, Ablett opted to remain with Geelong by agreeing to a lucrative five-year contract that tied him to the club for the long-term.

Ablett began the 1988 season with 59 goals after just 11 games, placing him second on the goalkicking list behind Hawthorn's Jason Dunstall. In these games, he kicked 10 goals against Richmond in the Anzac Day game, and 11 against Brisbane—one shy of breaking the ground record of 12 goals at Carrara. Although he missed out on State honours and failed to place within the top three in the club best and fairest award, Ablett finished with 82 goals during the season for the second time in his career.

==== A September to remember (1989–1990) ====
"The ball came down a contest and I was holding on [Ablett] ... He turned around to me and said, 'If you do that one more time, I'm going to knock you out'. I said, 'Now, Gary, that wouldn't be a godly thing to do, would it?' I still don't know whether he said 'I'm not God' or 'I am God'. Nedless to say, I continued to hold on as much as I could, for fear of getting knocked out."

— Scott Maginness on manning Ablett in the 1989 Grand Final

The 1989 season was marked by the arrival of Ablett's third coach, former North Melbourne Brownlow Medallist Malcolm Blight. Ablett helped the Cats reach the finals on the back of a ten match winning streak to end the regular season. In a 134-point victory against Richmond, Ablett scored 14 goals, breaking a 22-year club record, and moving club legend and former club premiership coach Bobby Davis to laud Ablett as the equal of the legendary Graham 'Polly' Farmer, the finest footballers he had seen at Geelong. His season lowlight occurred in Round 12 when he was suspended for 3 matches after he controversially felled the Melbourne captain, Gary Lyon behind the play.

In his first ever final, the Qualifying Final at the MCG versus Essendon, Gary Ablett kicked three goals, but this was not enough. The Bombers humbled Geelong by 76 points to force the Cats into a sudden-death Semi Final showdown with Melbourne. The Cats posted a 63-point win against the Demons. Ablett kicked seven goals, and helped set up another meeting with Essendon in the Preliminary Final. Ablett kicked 8 goals this time, as the Cats crushed Essendon by 94 points to advance to their first grand final since 1967.

Against the reigning premiers Hawthorn in the 1989 VFL Grand Final, Ablett asserted himself from the opening bounce, leading out from full forward, marking the first centre clearance kick and slotting through the game's first goal. By half-time, Ablett had kicked four goals, but the Cats trailed at the main break by 37 points. Ablett kicked a further five goals in the second half, which saw an injury-depleted Hawthorn's lead reduced to just 6 points with less than a minute to go. However, the Cats fell short, and Hawthorn held on to defeat Geelong in one of the toughest grand finals of the modern era, winning by 6 points. Ablett's performance in kicking 9 goals earned him the Norm Smith Medal, and in doing so became only the second member of the losing team in VFL/AFL history to be awarded the honour – a performance regarded by many as unrivalled on football's biggest stage. Ablett's 9 goals also saw him equal Gordon Coventry's goals record set in the 1928 Grand Final.

==== Shock retirement and return (1991–1992) ====
On 1 February 1991, Ablett, aged 29, stunned most football fans when he announced his retirement, citing personal reasons and a loss of enjoyment for the game. His previous season in 1990 was marred by injury, dipping motivation, and personal issues, including a separation from his wife. He was eventually encouraged to reverse his decision and he made his return in Round 12 for the Geelong reserves team. This generated enormous media interest and drew an abnormally large crowd for the curtain-raiser game at Princes Park. Ablett was named in the senior side for the following game against Melbourne, which drew a crowd of over 40,000 to the MCG. (Note: In 1991, the MCG was only operating at half capacity due to the building of the Great Southern Stand.) He had ten possessions and kicked two goals, one of them an important steadier for the Cats in the last quarter after the Demons had closed to within 24 points. Due to his late season start and lack of conditioning, it was probably no surprise that Ablett failed to recapture his best form, ending his season on a sour note when he was suspended for striking St Kilda rover Nathan Burke in the first week of the finals, and he subsequently missed Geelong's finals defeats to Hawthorn and West Coast.

Ablett put the disappointment of 1991 behind him, and he dedicated himself to improving his fitness base ahead of the 1992 season. A consistent first half of the year helped the Cats achieve an 11–3 record, eventually earning them a spot in the grand final—this time against the West Coast Eagles. After establishing a two-goal lead at half-time, the Cats failed to sustain their momentum during the second half, eventually going down by 28 points to the fast-finishing Eagles. Ablett, who finished with 3 goals, had again failed to finish the year with the same good form in which he had begun it.

==== One special season (1993) ====
Before the 1993 season, Ablett was encouraged by his coach, Malcolm Blight, to move from his customary roaming half-forward position to full-forward, in an effort to prolong his career. The move up forward proved to be a master-stroke, with Ablett thriving in his goal-kicking role, reaching the 50-goal mark in just six games, equalling the sixty-year record of South Melbourne legend Bob Pratt. He brought up his maiden century of goals in the season just eight games later, one game slower than record-holder Pratt, and became the first Geelong player to kick 100 goals in a season since Larry Donohue in 1976. Although the Cats did not make the Finals, Ablett's new-found dominance up forward was highlighted during the season with his bags of ten or more goals on five occasions, including a 14-goal performance against Essendon in Round 6. His end-of-season total of 124 goals, achieved in just 17 appearances, earned him his first Coleman Medal as the League's leading goal-scorer, the Leigh Matthews Trophy, the AFMA Player of the Year Award, and a top-ten placing in the Brownlow Medal.

==== 1993 to 1996 ====
"One part beauty, nine parts drama. Did he take it? Should it have been paid? Is it the greatest ever? Do we mark it down in the greatest-ever lists because of the question marks? What we overlook is the degree of difficulty, as a twisting, falling Ablett plunges to earth while still retaining the Sherrin with one hand. Is it a mark, after all these years? Still not sure."

— Jon Ralph on Ablett's 1994 Mark of the Year

Ablett continued his dominance as a full-forward in 1994 and 1995 by winning the Coleman Medal in each year. Ablett is the only player in VFL/AFL history to kick 100 goals and win the Coleman Medal in three successive seasons. In addition to his explosive pace and skills, Ablett was also an accomplished aerialist with strong hands. A highlight was the 1994 Mark of the Year over Collingwood's Gary Pert on Mother's Day at the MCG, a mark which is captured in Jamie Cooper's painting the Game That Made Australia, commissioned by the AFL in 2008 to celebrate the 150th anniversary of the sport. There is still debate over whether he had enough control of the ball to be paid a mark.

In early 1996, Ablett was suspended for five games for striking St Kilda's 172 cm Kristian Bardsley with a raised forearm. He later remarked that his lengthy suspension was the "beginning of the end", and he finished out the season with 69 goals in 17 games. His last AFL appearance was against North Melbourne in a Qualifying Final in 1996. Ablett managed to kick only one goal in a disappointing 60-point loss. In October 1996, he missed Geelong's first training session and was fined $10,000.

On 22 November 1996, Ablett was admitted to hospital with a severe bout of gastro. On 28 November, Ablett faced traffic charges.

==== 1997, end of career ====
Ablett was ready to start the serious training with the club by the first week of January. By February, it was reported that he was still under pressure to improve his fitness. In March, Geelong confirmed that Ablett would play in 1997. On Sunday, 31 March 1997, Ablett played in the reserves against Richmond. Gary booted 7 goals but injured his knee. Three days later, on 3 April, he underwent arthroscopic surgery. In early June, Ablett had still not recovered; he faced knee surgery. During the preliminary finals in September, he announced his retirement from football.

=== State of Origin ===
Ablett had a prolific State of Origin career, kicking 43 goals in 11 games. He was first selected to play for Victoria in 1984, against Western Australia, only nine games into his career at Geelong, kicking 8 goals in a best-on-ground performance.

He performed well again the following year, kicking 4 goals against South Australia. In the following few years Ablett was largely out of the side, apart from 1987, when he kicked 2 goals against South Australia. Ablett again performed at the highest level in 1990, kicking 6 goals, against Western Australia in Perth. After returning from retirement midway through 1991, and after only several games, Ablett was controversially selected for Victoria, kicking 2 goals. In 1992 Ablett performed well, kicking 3 goals and being named among the best players, against Western Australia.

In 1993, he kicked 4 goals, against a combined New South Wales–Australian Capital Territory side, and in the same year Ablett again performed on the big stage, kicking 5 goals in the State of Origin Carnival Grand Final. In 1994, he kicked 4 goals, against South Australia, in what has been regarded as "one of the greatest Australian football games of all time" and followed up that performance with 4 goals against South Australia in 1995. On representing Victoria, Ablett has said "I've always found it a tremendous honour to represent your state, in a State of Origin game".

== Legacy ==
Ablett combined strength, speed, and skill to produce many spectacular highlights and goal-kicking feats. A noted big game player, Ablett kicked 43 goals in 11 State appearances. Also significantly, he booted 64 goals over the course of his 16 finals – an average of four goals a game. His individual haul of 27 goals in the 1989 finals series from four games is a VFL/AFL record that still stands. He was awarded the Norm Smith Medal for his performance in the 1989 Grand Final, where he was adjudged best player afield. In doing so, he became one of only four players to win the medal playing for the losing side (the others being Maurice Rioli in 1982, Nathan Buckley in 2002, and Chris Judd in 2005). In 1996, Ablett joined Gordon Coventry, Doug Wade, Jason Dunstall, and Tony Lockett as the only players in league history to kick 1000 VFL/AFL goals. Lance Franklin would join this exclusive club in 2022.

Martin Flanagan's representation of Australian football pioneer Tom Wills in his 1996 novel The Call is modeled on Ablett. According to Flanagan, Wills and Ablett polarised opinion in similar ways, and displayed a lack of insight into their actions—they simply did what came naturally to them, "like a lot of artists". Ablett is the subject of the song "Kicking the Footy with God", released by The Bedroom Philosopher on his 2005 debut album In Bed with My Doona.

In 1996, Ablett was named in the AFL Team of the Century on the interchange bench, alongside Jack Dyer and Greg Williams. In 2001, Ablett was named in the Geelong Team of the Century, on a half-forward flank. In 2005, after many years of controversy and debate (see below), he was inducted into the Australian Football Hall of Fame. The following year, he was honoured yet again when he was voted as the Greatest Geelong player of all-time ahead of Graham Farmer.

In 2006, Ablett was honoured with the naming of a terrace in his name within the newly renovated Skilled Stadium. Ablett once had a set of gates named in his honour, but he was upgraded to a terrace at the beginning of the 2006 AFL season.

=== Induction into the Australian Football Hall of Fame ===
Despite his footballing achievements on the field, Ablett's induction into the Australian Football Hall of Fame was initially delayed. Despite Ablett's undoubted footballing credentials, his well-publicised contribution to the death of Alisha Horan was responsible for the Australian Football Hall of Fame committee's reluctance to induct him. In 2004, after several years of speculation over his induction, Ablett personally requested that the Geelong Football Club stop nominating him for selection, which the club agreed to. However, the following year it was announced that Ablett would be inducted into the Hall of Fame as part of the 2005 intake.

Ablett did not attend the induction ceremony and instead released a statement through his then-manager, Michael Baker:

"Due to my current battle with depression I am not in a position to be able to accept this award in person. I did not make this decision lightly but due to medical advice it was deemed best for my health that I do not attend tonight. I feel blessed to have had the opportunity to play this great game and also to have played at the elite level alongside many celebrated champions. Being chosen to be inducted into the Hall of Fame is one of the highest honours a player could dream of. I thank those who deem me worthy enough to be placed alongside such respected company."

== Personal life ==
The youngest of eight children, Ablett grew up alongside four elder brothers and three elder sisters. In 1985, Ablett wed his long-time girlfriend Sue, and the couple had four children – Natasha, Gary Jr., Nathan, and Alisha.

In 1986, Ablett became a born-again Christian and has been said to be slightly aggrieved at constantly being referred to as "God" by fans, a nickname based on his supreme football abilities. Ablett's faith was often highlighted in several tribunal appearances, in one case confessing and pleading guilty to striking Garry Lyon in a 1989 incident, declaring he "wasn't prepared to lie about it or compromise the truth in [his] relationship with God". Ablett's public acknowledgement of his faith, in particular the influence of God in his life, during his acceptance speech for the Norm Smith Medal in the 1989 Grand Final, was also much publicised.

On 26 June 2006, Ablett was allegedly assaulted at 11:15pm while browsing through a car yard in Fyans Street, South Geelong. A 31-year-old Geelong man was charged with the assault. However, he was reported to have committed suicide on 10 July 2006 by jumping from a Melbourne high-rise apartment block the day before he was due to appear before the Geelong Magistrates court to defend the assault charges.

In December 2007, Ablett hit back at media claims that his son Nathan had walked away from his football career because of the publicity surrounding the release of a new book about his father. Although normally reluctant to make public comments, Ablett felt that the media intrusion into his family life had gone too far. As part of a series of books, Legends of Australian Sport, Ablett contributed to a book regarding himself. It was the first time he revealed intimate details regarding his life publicly.

In September 2020, Ablett released a 27-minute YouTube video discussing his belief in the rapture as being forthcoming. In this video, he declared that the COVID-19 pandemic had been manufactured and released by the Illuminati and Freemasons in order to depopulate Earth, create a cashless society and "put Lucifer on the throne of the world".

=== A footballing family ===
Two of Ablett's brothers played in the Victorian Football League – Kevin Ablett, who played for Hawthorn, Richmond and Geelong, and Geoff Ablett, who played for Hawthorn, Richmond and St Kilda.

Ablett's eldest son, Gary Jr., has followed in his footsteps to play for Geelong. In 2007 and 2009, Ablett Jr. won the Cats' best and fairest award, emulating a feat established by his father in his first season with the Cats back in 1984; he also won the Brownlow Medal in 2009 and 2013. Another son, Nathan, was drafted in 2004 (48th pick) by Geelong under the father–son rule. Nathan initially refused to play AFL Football because of his father's experience with the media, but, with encouragement from the club, was signed ahead of the 2005 AFL Season and established himself in the full forward role Gary Sr. made his own.

On 29 September 2007, both Gary Jr. and Nathan contributed to Geelong winning its first flag in 44 years, capturing the premiership that proved elusive to Gary Snr in his 12 years at the club. Nathan retired suddenly before the 2008 season, but he and his brother Gary Jr. were members of the Gold Coast Football Club's inaugural team for the 2011 season.

In addition to his sons, Ablett has a nephew, Luke Ablett, who played for the Sydney Swans and won a premiership with them in 2005. Two other nephews, from his sister's marriage to Hawthorn legend Michael Tuck, also played in the AFL – Richmond's Shane Tuck and Travis Tuck, who played for Hawthorn.

=== Criminal offences ===
Ablett had well-documented off-field problems, particularly with illegal drug use, and depression in the wake of the Alisha Horan death. In 1990, Ablett was placed on a $10,000 good behaviour bond after he pleaded guilty to repeatedly hitting a man he found sitting in a car with his estranged wife.

In 2000, Ablett was investigated, charged and convicted of four drug offences as a result of twenty-year-old Geelong woman Alisha Horan dying of a drug overdose (involving heroin, ecstasy and amphetamines) while in Ablett's hotel room. After a prolonged period of refusing to answer police questions and refusing to answer questions at an April 2001 inquest (on the grounds that he may incriminate himself), Ablett later admitted to providing Horan with heroin and ecstasy. Horan had found a small quantity of heroin in Ablett's coat pocket and asked him what it was. Rather than admit that it was heroin, Ablett told her it was cocaine, which they both then ingested, leading to Horan's overdose. Ablett was charged with, and pleaded guilty to four drugs charges, and was convicted and fined $1500.

== Concussion lawsuit ==
In April 2023, Ablett commenced legal proceedings in the Supreme Court of Victoria against the AFL and the Geelong and Hawthorn football clubs claiming breach of duty and negligence over AFL-related brain injuries that he suffered during his playing career.

== Statistics ==
In 2019, a sharp-eyed "footy history enthusiast" by the name of Stephen Wade noticed a statistical discrepancy while watching a YouTube video of a 1982 game that had been uploaded in 2017. He found a discrepancy with the goal total, as he saw Ablett kick two but was only credited for one. Wade brought his discovery to the attention of Col Hutchinson, the AFL's statistics and history consultant, who updated the official records. The goal, which had been erroneously attributed to Hawthorn teammate Richard Loveridge for 37 years, increased Ablett's total goal tally from 1,030 to 1,031.

Legend
G	Goals	K	Kicks	D	Disposals	T	Tackles
B	Behinds	H	Handballs	M	Marks

Led the league for the season only
Led the league after finals only
Led the league after season and finals

Season	Team	No.	Games	Totals							Averages (per game)						
Season	Team	No.	Games	G	B	K	H	D	M	T	G	B	K	H	D	M	T
1982	Hawthorn	35	6	10	13	47	21	68	26	—N/a	1.5	2.2	7.8	3.5	11.3	4.3	—N/a
1984	Geelong	5	15	33	28	238	61	299	86	—N/a	2.2	1.9	15.9	4.1	19.9	5.7	—N/a
1985	Geelong	5	20	82	67	274	62	336	135	—N/a	4.1	3.4	13.7	3.1	16.8	6.8	—N/a
1986	Geelong	5	15	65	49	185	39	224	101	—N/a	4.3	3.3	12.3	2.6	14.9	6.7	—N/a
1987	Geelong	5	17	53	38	200	46	246	86	19	3.1	2.2	11.8	2.7	14.5	5.1	1.1
1988	Geelong	5	21	82	62	253	42	295	117	19	3.9	3.0	12.0	2.0	14.0	5.6	0.9
1989	Geelong	5	23	87	54	378	68	446	151	29	3.8	2.3	16.4	3.0	19.4	6.6	1.3
1990	Geelong	5	17	75	43	224	47	271	100	21	4.4	2.5	13.2	2.8	15.9	5.9	1.2
1991	Geelong	5	12	28	27	144	21	165	55	20	2.3	2.3	12.0	1.8	13.8	4.6	1.7
1992	Geelong	5	21	72	54	324	61	385	118	33	3.4	2.6	15.4	2.9	18.3	5.6	1.6
1993	Geelong	5	17	124	60	233	13	246	111	10	7.3	3.5	13.7	0.8	14.5	6.5	0.6
1994	Geelong	5	25	129	79	263	30	293	130	15	5.2	3.2	10.5	1.2	11.7	5.2	0.6
1995	Geelong	5	22	122	85	264	19	283	148	18	5.5	3.9	12.0	0.9	12.9	6.7	0.8
1996	Geelong	5	17	69	31	159	31	190	71	13	4.1	1.8	9.4	1.8	11.2	4.2	0.8
1997	Geelong	5	-	-	-	-	-	-	-	-	-	-	-	-	-	-	-
Career			248	1031	690	3186	561	3747	1435	197	4.2	2.8	12.8	2.3	15.1	5.8	1.0
Career			248	1031	690	3186	561	3747	1435	197	4.2	2.8	12.8	2.3	15.1	5.8	1.0

== Honours and achievements ==
Team

- McClelland Trophy (Geelong): 1992

Individual

- Norm Smith Medal: 1989
- 3× Coleman Medal: 1993, 1994, 1995
- 4× All-Australian team: 1992, 1993, 1994, 1995
- 4× VFL/AFL Team of the Year: 1984, 1986, 1989, 1990
- Carji Greeves Medal: 1984
- Leigh Matthews Trophy (AFL MVP Award): 1993
- 9× Geelong leading goalkicker: 1985, 1986, 1988, 1989, 1990, 1993, 1994, 1995, 1996
- Geelong Team of the Century
- Geelong captain: 1995–1996
- 2× Alex Jesaulenko Medal: 1985, 1994
- Geelong F.C. Hall of Fame
- Australian Sports Medal: 2000
- Centenary Medal: 2001
- Australian Football League Team of the Century 1897-1996
- VFL/AFL players with 1,000 goals
- 8× State of Origin (Victoria): 1984, 1989, 1990, 1991, 1992, 1993, 1994, 1995 (c)
- Australian Football Media Association Player of the Year: 1993
- Australian Football Hall of Fame: 2005 Inductee
- 5th on all-time leading goal-kickers
- All-time leading goal kicker for Geelong F.C. (1021 goals)
- Only player to have won Coleman Medal and kicked 100 goals in three consecutive seasons (1993–1995)
- Oldest player to kick 100 goals in a season (33 years old in 1995)
- Most goals in an AFL/VFL Grand Final (9 goals in 1989 Grand Final)
- Most goals in an AFL/VFL finals series (27 goals in 1989)
- Highest goals-per-game ratio in Geelong F.C. history (4.22 goals per game)
- 4-time runner-up in Carji Greeves Medal (1985, 1993, 1994, 1995)
- 3-time third-place getter in Carji Greeves Medal (1986, 1989, 1990)

== See also ==
- After the siren kicks in Australian rules football
- Alf Williamson

== Bibliography ==
- Linnell, Garry (2004). Playing God: The Rise and Fall of Gary Ablett. HarperCollins Australia. ISBN 9780732274498.
