= Travis Tuck =

Australian rules footballer (born 1987)

Personal information
- Born: 7 September 1987 (age 39)
- Original team: Dandenong Stingrays (TAC Cup)
- Draft: No. 38 (F/S), 2005 national draft
- Debut: Round 17, 2007, Hawthorn vs. Kangaroos, at Aurora Stadium
- Height: 188 cm (6 ft 2 in)
- Weight: 88 kg (194 lb)

Playing career^{1}
Years	Club	Games (Goals)
2006–2011	Hawthorn	20 (1)
- ^{1} Playing statistics correct to the end of 2010.

Travis Tuck (born 7 September 1987) is a former Australian rules football player who played with the Hawthorn Football Club in the Australian Football League. Tuck was selected with a father–son selection (pick 38) in the 2005 AFL draft.

== Background ==
Tuck comes from a family of football starts. He is the son of Hawthorn legend and former VFL/AFL games record holder Michael Tuck, brother of Richmond midfielder Shane Tuck, nephew of Geelong superstar Gary Ablett Sr, and cousin of Gold Coast captain Gary Ablett Jr.

== Career ==
Tuck debuted in Round 17 of 2007 against North Melbourne, and, despite a serviceable performance on the day, he made way for a number of returning senior players the following week. This proved to be Tuck's only game for the season.

During the first month of 2008, Tuck enjoyed a breakout year. After a string of strong pre-season performances, Tuck was selected in the senior side for Round 1 and remained there in the month that followed. A highlight was a 25-possession Round 2 performance against Fremantle, where Tuck was named in Hawthorn's best. Injury struck in Round 4, however, and it proved to be 9 weeks until he was able to reclaim a place in the Hawks lineup. Tuck played Rounds 13 to 17, before again making way for other players. Tuck was listed as an emergency for the successful 2008 Grand Final side.

Tuck failed to play a match for Hawthorn's senior side in 2010; and, on 27 August, Tuck was found unconscious in a car by police and was treated for an alleged drug overdose. Tuck then became the first player to receive a third strike under the AFL's illicit drugs policy. The operations manager for the AFL, Adrian Anderson, stated that Tuck's drug use was "not recreational" and was the result of clinical depression. On 31 August, the AFL Tribunal suspended Tuck for 12 matches and fined him A$5000. Tuck continued to train with Hawthorn during the summer of 2010–11 in the hope of gaining a place on the club's Rookie List for the 2011 season; however, he was advised in March 2011 that he had been overlooked in favour of former West Coast and Melbourne player Paul Johnson.

Tuck played for Werribee in the VFL in 2011 and 2012. From 2013 until he retired at the end of 2016, he played for West Adelaide in the SANFL. He played 70 games with the club and kicked 54 goals. He was named one of the best in the SANFL 2015 Grand Final.

== Statistics ==
Legend
G	Goals	K	Kicks	D	Disposals	T	Tackles
B	Behinds	H	Handballs	M	Marks

Season	Team	No.	Games	Totals							Averages (per game)							Votes
Season	Team	No.	Games	G	B	K	H	D	M	T	G	B	K	H	D	M	T	Votes
2006	Hawthorn	38	0	—	—	—	—	—	—	—	—	—	—	—	—	—	—	0
2007	Hawthorn	38	1	0	0	6	7	13	4	3	0.0	0.0	6.0	7.0	13.0	4.0	3.0	0
2008	Hawthorn	22	8	1	1	61	71	132	33	32	0.1	0.1	7.6	8.9	16.5	4.1	2.8	0
2009	Hawthorn	22	11	0	0	84	142	226	47	21	0.0	0.0	7.6	12.9	20.5	4.3	1.9	0
2010	Hawthorn	22	0	—	—	—	—	—	—	—	—	—	—	—	—	—	—	0
Career			20	1	1	151	220	371	84	46	0.1	0.1	7.6	11.0	18.6	4.2	2.3	0

== See also ==
- List of Australian rules football families
