= 2013 Brownlow Medal =

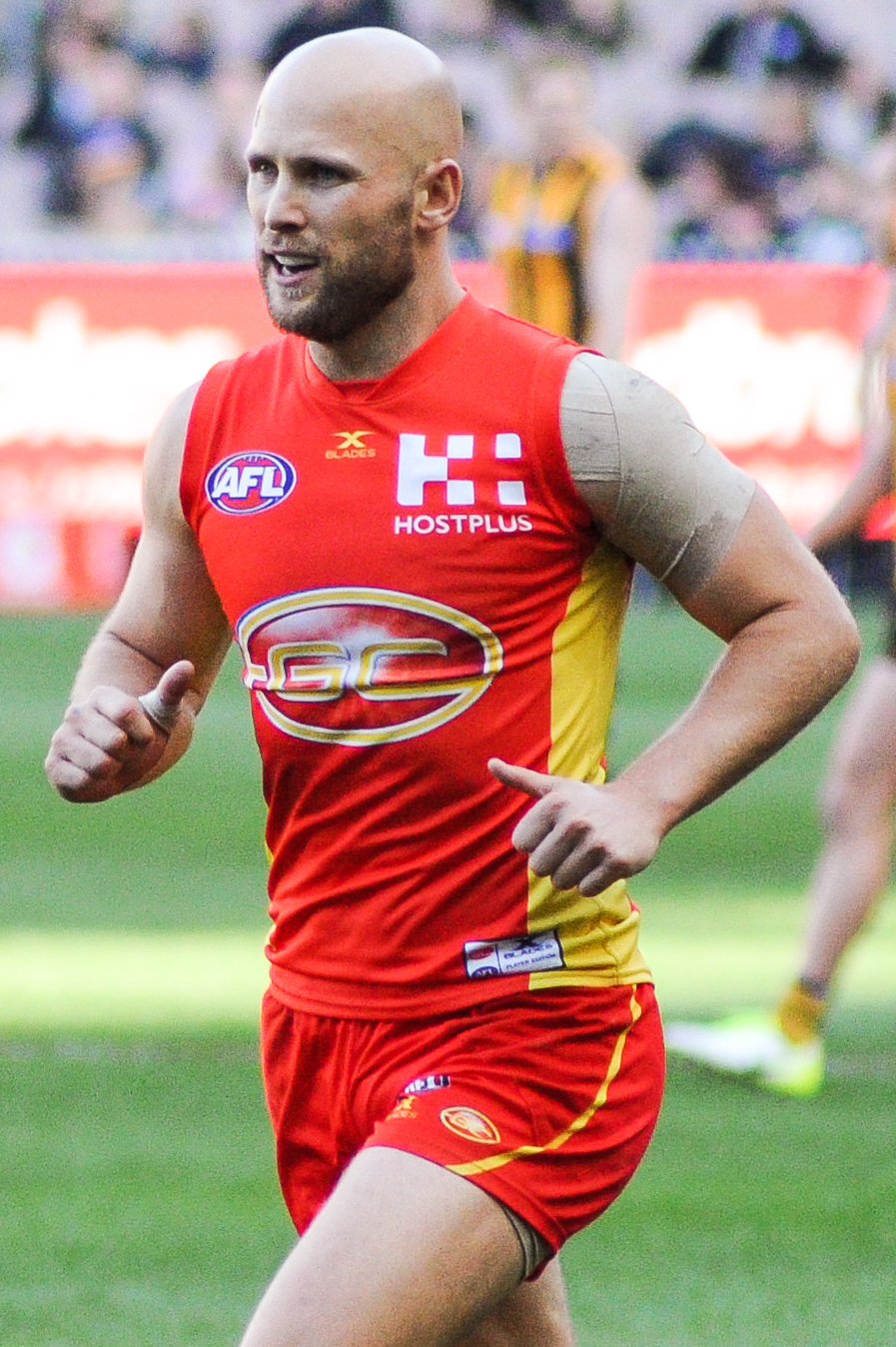
- 2013 Brownlow Medallist, Gary Ablett
- Date: 23 September
- Location: Crown Palladium
- Hosted by: Bruce McAvaney
- Winner: Gary Ablett (Gold Coast); 28 votes

Television/radio coverage
- Network: Seven Network; Fox Footy

The 2013 Brownlow Medal was the 86th year the award was presented to the player adjudged the fairest and best player during the Australian Football League (AFL) home and away season. Gary Ablett of the Gold Coast Football Club won the medal for the second time by polling twenty-eight votes during the 2013 AFL season.

== Leading vote-getters ==
	Player	Votes
1st	Gary Ablett (Gold Coast)	28
2nd	Joel Selwood (Geelong)	27
3rd	Dane Swan (Collingwood)	26
	Steve Johnson (Geelong)*	25
4th	Patrick Dangerfield (Adelaide)	22
=5th	Dan Hannebery (Sydney)	21
=5th	Scott Pendlebury (Collingwood)	21
=5th	Tom Rockliff (Brisbane)	21
=8th	Trent Cotchin (Richmond)	19
=8th	Kieren Jack (Sydney)	19
10th	Nathan Fyfe (Fremantle)	18

* The player was ineligible to win the medal due to suspension by the AFL Tribunal during the year.

== Voting procedure ==
The three field umpires (those umpires who control the flow of the game, as opposed to goal or boundary umpires) confer after each match and award three votes, two votes, and one vote to the players they regard as the best, second-best and third-best in the match, respectively. The votes are kept secret until the awards night, and they are read and tallied on the evening.

As the medal is awarded to the fairest and best player in the league, those who have been suspended during the season by the AFL Tribunal (or, who avoided suspension only because of a discount for a good record or an early guilty plea) are ineligible to win the award; however, they may still continue to poll votes.

== Graph Of 2013 Brownlow count ==
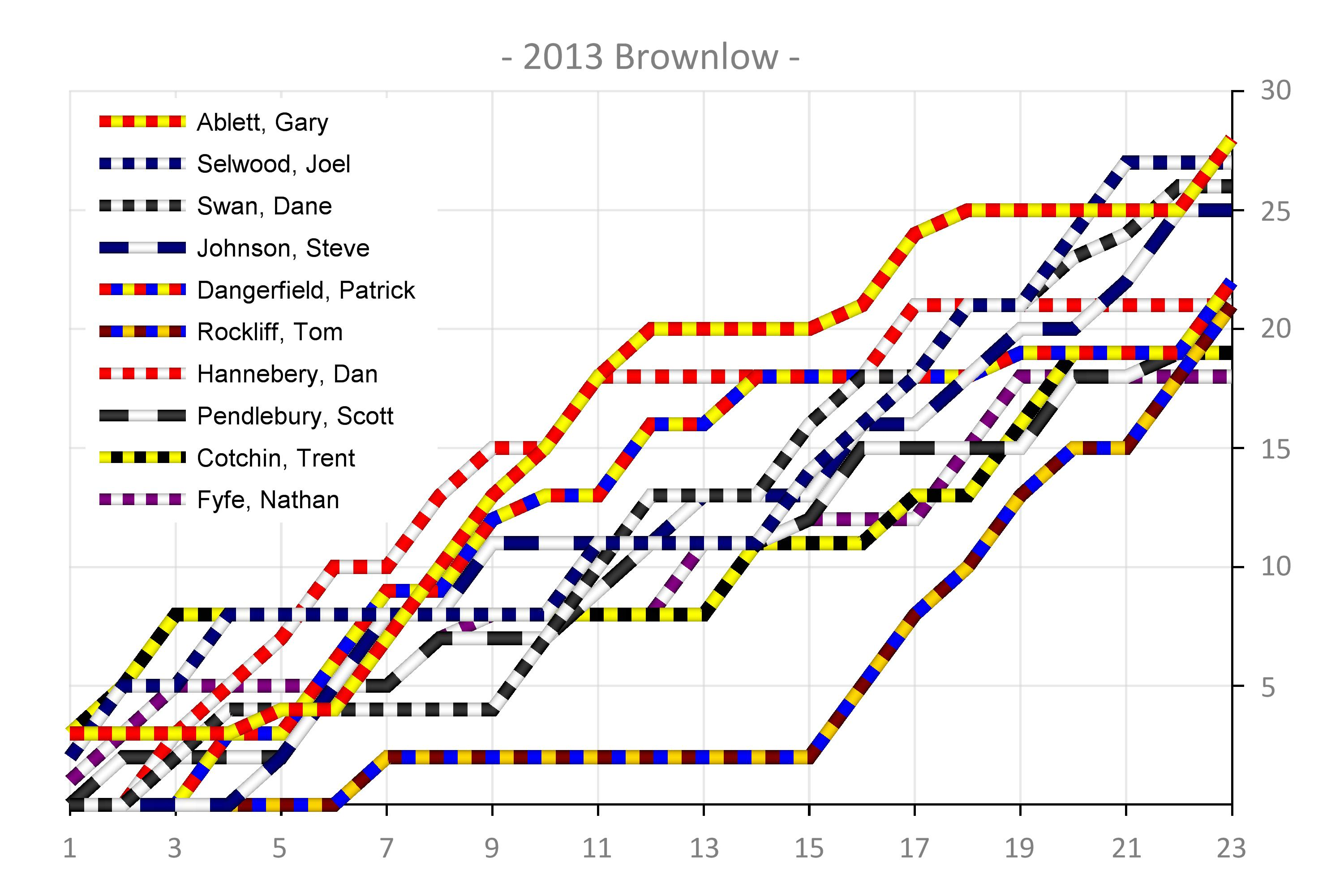
2013 Brownlow Vote
