= Luke Ablett =

Australian rules footballer, born 1982

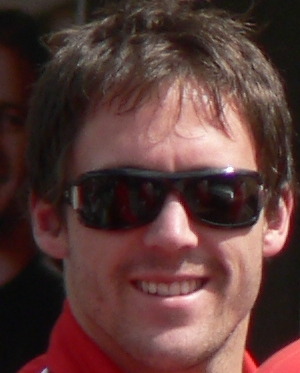

Personal information
- Born: 22 November 1982 (age 43)
- Original team: Drouin/Gippsland Power (TAC Cup)
- Debut: Round 13, 30 June 2002, Sydney vs. Fremantle, at SCG
- Height: 184 cm (6 ft 0 in)
- Weight: 89 kg (196 lb)

Playing career^{1}
| Years | Club | Games (Goals) |
| 2002–2009 | Sydney Swans | 133 (39) |
- ^{1} Playing statistics correct to the end of 2009.

Career highlights
- AFL premiership player: 2005

Luke Ablett (born 22 November 1982) is a former Australian rules footballer with the Sydney Swans of the AFL. He is the son of former Hawthorn player Kevin Ablett, and nephew of Hawthorn player Geoff Ablett and Geelong player Gary Ablett.

Having played for local club Drouin and the Gippsland Under 18s side, Ablett was drafted by Sydney in the second round of the 2000 National Draft and made his debut in Round 13 of the 2002 season against Fremantle. After playing four games in both that season and the next, including two matches in the 2003 finals series, he secured a regular place in the team in 2004, and made a role for himself on his own merits as a midfielder and run-with player. In 2005 he missed only one game and steadily improved, his average possessions nearly doubling the previous year's figures. Ablett was a member of the Swans' 2005 grand final winning team, despite kicking straight to West Coast player Ben Cousins at a crucial moment, threatening to lose the game for Sydney. Being part of the premiership team had him following in the footsteps of his uncle Geoff, a two time premiership player for Hawthorn in the 1970s. Ablett now plays for the Fitzroy Football Club in Melbourne.

Ablett was delisted by Sydney on 13 November 2009.

== Statistics ==
Legend
| G | Goals | K | Kicks | D | Disposals | T | Tackles |
| B | Behinds | H | Handballs | M | Marks |

| Season | Team | No. | Games | Totals | | | | | | | Averages (per game) | | | | | | |
| Season | Team | No. | Games | G | B | K | H | D | M | T | G | B | K | H | D | M | T |
|---|---|---|---|---|---|---|---|---|---|---|---|---|---|---|---|---|---|
| 2002 | Sydney | 20 | 4 | 0 | 0 | 12 | 7 | 19 | 3 | 3 | 0.0 | 0.0 | 3.0 | 1.8 | 4.8 | 0.8 | 0.8 |
| 2003 | Sydney | 20 | 4 | 1 | 0 | 10 | 7 | 17 | 6 | 0 | 0.3 | 0.0 | 2.5 | 1.8 | 4.3 | 1.5 | 0.0 |
| 2004 | Sydney | 20 | 21 | 2 | 4 | 123 | 76 | 199 | 42 | 31 | 0.1 | 0.2 | 5.9 | 3.6 | 9.5 | 2.0 | 1.5 |
| 2005 | Sydney | 20 | 25 | 9 | 12 | 243 | 115 | 358 | 65 | 64 | 0.4 | 0.5 | 9.7 | 4.6 | 14.3 | 2.6 | 2.6 |
| 2006 | Sydney | 20 | 24 | 8 | 8 | 244 | 108 | 352 | 68 | 72 | 0.3 | 0.3 | 10.2 | 4.5 | 14.7 | 2.8 | 3.0 |
| 2007 | Sydney | 20 | 20 | 8 | 10 | 196 | 109 | 305 | 60 | 62 | 0.4 | 0.5 | 9.8 | 5.5 | 15.3 | 3.0 | 3.1 |
| 2008 | Sydney | 20 | 22 | 3 | 7 | 190 | 117 | 307 | 53 | 56 | 0.1 | 0.3 | 8.6 | 5.3 | 14.0 | 2.4 | 2.5 |
| 2009 | Sydney | 20 | 13 | 8 | 10 | 76 | 90 | 166 | 35 | 40 | 0.6 | 0.8 | 5.8 | 6.9 | 12.8 | 2.7 | 3.1 |
| Career | | | 133 | 39 | 51 | 1094 | 629 | 1723 | 332 | 328 | 0.3 | 0.4 | 8.2 | 4.7 | 13.0 | 2.5 | 2.5 |
