= Myrtleford Alpine Saints Football Netball Club =

Myrtleford
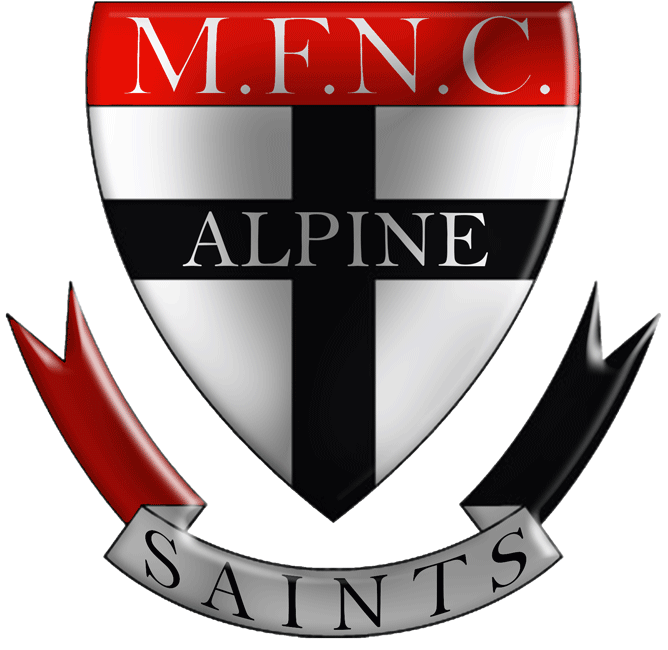

Names
- Full name: Myrtleford Alpine Saints Football Netball Club
- Nickname: The Saints
- Motto: "The Saints Way"
- Club song: "Oh When The Saints Go Marching In"

Club details
- Founded: 1886; 140 years ago
- Colours
- Competition: Ovens & Murray Football League
- Premierships: 1970
- Ground: McNamara Reserve

Uniforms
Home

Other information
- Official website: myrtlefordfnc.teamapp.com

The Myrtleford Alpine Saints Football Netball Club, is an Australian rules football and netball club based in the town of Myrtleford, in north east Victoria on the Ovens River. The football and netball squads play in the Ovens & Murray Football League (OMFL).

Myrtleford was initiated into the Ovens District Football Association in 1895, which later became the Bright Shire Football Association in 1900. The club joined the OMFL in 1950. Myrtleford's only premiership triumph was against Wangaratta Rovers in 1970. The Saints were runners-up in 2001, 2005 and 2006.

The club has produced VFL/AFL players including Len Ablett, Sam Kekovich, Steve McKee, Guy Rigoni, Frazer Dale, Jack Crisp and Matt Taberner. Other VFL/AFL footballers who have played with Myrtleford include Alby Rodda, Jim Deane, 1970 premiership coach Martin Cross, Gary Ablett Sr., Ben Beams and Kevin Smith

In 2013 the club committee announce the club would change its name to the Alpine Saints for the 2014 season.

== History ==
=== Myrtleford Saints History, 1886–1950 ===
Myrtlefords initiation into football was on a cold, wet day in June, 1886 in Bright which saw the local team put up 10 goals to the Myrtleford team's one. The Team had two champions then in "Griffo" Edwards and "Baldy" Reid and other memorable names in "Son" McAlpine, Jimmy Brady, Bob O'Donnell and "Bish" Puzey, five Milne and four Wallace brothers were numbered in the team. The association was formed in 1895 and known as the Ovens District Football Association and engaged such teams as Bright, Wandiligong, Harrietville, Porepunkah and Myrtleford. More teams were formed and joined later on.

In 1890, the Church of England's Reverend Chambers gave the land which is known as Memorial park to the people of Myrtleford to be used as a football and sports oval. After the association had become a reality, Joseph Ferguson, MP for the Ovens Electorate, donated a very fine cup to be won three years in succession. This was won by Myrtleford and is still in the club's possession. After this trophy was won by the Myrtleford team, John Alfred Isaacs (MLA for Ovens) presented a cup for the competition and after a further three years was won by Myrtleford on 14 September 1895. The game was one of the most memorable battles that has ever taken place on the Bright ground. The Myrtleford team went by special train to Bright and were accompanied by an army of supporters led by Mr Joe Rothery (President) to witness the battle between Myrtleford and Wandiligong. Yellow and Black colours dominated the ground and attendance was said to be at about 1200. The Myrtleford Tigers were a force for years to come.

In 1900 the Bright Shire Football Association superseded the Ovens District Football Association and after the turn of the century a Mr Farley donated a trophy again to be kept by the team who won the Premiership three years in succession and once again Myrtleford took out the honour. (Evidence ?) The Myrtleford club continued to have their share of success, winning the Ovens Football Association premiership in 1914. In 1931, the Myrtleford Wanderers, a team of mainly young players plus a few senior players from the Myrtleford team entered the Bright Shire Football Association, with their colours being Maroon with a yellow V. Myrtleford entered a side into the Ovens & King FL in the late 1920's and were runners up to Moyhu FC by two points in 1929 and then played in six consecutive grand finals between 1933 & 1938.

The Ovens and King Football League consisted of Myrtleford, Beechworth, Eldorado, Milawa, Whorouly, Waratahs, Moyhu and King Valley United. While the Myrtleford Bright District Football League consisted of Gapsted, Wanderers, Harrietville, Bright, Porepunkah, Valley Rovers, Buffalo River, Whorouly Rovers with Beechworth Stars joining in 1938. A major event occurred in 1933 with the first ever league club to visit Myrtleford. North Melbourne made the journey on a day that was marred with constant drizzle, effectively depleting the large attendance that was expected. The Myrtleford Times reported that the visitors were superior and that their systematic team work at times completely dazzled the locals. The final score was North Melbourne 20.23 to Myrtleford 16.11.

Since Myrtleford success in 1923 another Premiership seemed a long time coming but by 1934 the strength of the team was improving with J. Morrison as captain and R. Glazebrook as vice, the Myrtleford team's tally in the Ovens and King was 182 goals 224 behinds for and 137 goals 147 behinds against. 1935 was a step closer with Myrtleford coming runners up to the Waratahs. The following year was to see success and the Blue and White team won the premiership against Whorouly. 1939 and once again Australia was caught up in War. Because so many of the Myrtleford Team joined the army, the club went into recess for the war's duration.

The Wanderers continued on, losing the 1940 Premiership to Towonga by two points and then joined the Ovens and King in place of the senior team. The entire league went into recess from 1942 to 1944. In 1945 the Ovens and King League and the Wanderers reformed, with Len Ablett as Captain Coach. President of the club was Mr. Harry West and Secretary Mr. Jack Wacker. This was their Year and the Wanderers adopting the original Myrtleford Colours of Black with a Gold Sash, took out the flag with a win against Milawa. During the 1946 season, The Myrtleford Football Club reformed once again and it was resolved that the Wanderers would arrange a meeting with the newly reformed club with a view of amalgamating the two clubs for the next season. The end of the 1946 season saw the Wanderers runners up to Greta. The 1947 Season saw many change. During the AGM of the Wanderers Football Club a discussion took place to the desirability of running the two clubs under one name and whether the majority desired to change the name from 'Wanderers' to 'Myrtleford Football Club Firsts'. It was suggested that both teams be disbanded and a conference of both teams be organized. It was pointed out that such a conference had already been held and the result had not proved successful. Nevertheless, the conference did take place on 21 February 1947 and the Myrtleford Football Club agreed to the formation of one club.

The teams were merged and called the Myrtleford Football Club with the first eighteen to compete in the Ovens and King and the second eighteen in the Myrtleford and Bright District Football League. Myrtleford First Team went through their first season winning nearly all their games but a controversial issue saw them losing all their points and ending up on the bottom of the ladder instead of first place. A player named A. Janides was registered under his nickname 'Mick' resulting in the points been deducted. The Second eighteen become runners-up to Harrietville.

In 1948 and 1949 saw both teams competing in their respective leagues with both being runners up in 1948. The senior team lost the O&KFL grand final to the Wangaratta Rovers. 1949 also saw the beginnings of a junior league in the District. A match was arranged as a curtain raiser which led to more Junior games been played and a junior knock out competition to be held on the Kings birthday. Invitations went out to Bright, Beechworth, Whorouly, Wodonga and Myrtleford. The end of the 1949 season saw the Myrtleford Seniors finally defeat the Wangaratta Rovers in the O&KFL Grand Final to become Premiers. A fitting Climax for they also created a record in the Ovens and King Football League by not being defeated in a single match for the entire season.

In late 1949 Myrtleford put an application towards the Ovens and Murray Football League to be included in the 1950 season.

1950 - 1974: Ovens and Murray Football League

In February, 1950 at the O&MFL Annual General Meeting, both Myrtleford and Wangaratta Rovers were admitted into the league. Myrtleford Football Club made an debut with an great score into the Ovens and Murray League in round one of 1950 by being narrowly beaten by the previous runner-up in Wodonga. The scores Wodonga 12-9-81 defeated Myrtleford 11-10-76. The Saints had to adapt to new colours with Albury Tigers already wearing the black and gold colours, the Myrtleford team sported the colours we now are associated with and take pride towards the mighty Red, White and Black. And then, the club would pass through a new era. Len Ablett polled well in the Morris Medal finishing close behind the place getters with 16 votes. This year was also to see success of the Second Eighteen team, captained by 'Dooley' McIntyre, they defeated Bright in the Grand Final of the Myrtleford and Bright League.

It had become obvious that the ground in Prince Street was not of suitable standard for Ovens and Murray football and after complaints had been lodged with the league, moves were made to seek a new location. After many hours of negotiation, the present ground along Lewis Avenue was purchased from Mr Scuito for 4,000 pounds. There followed thousands of volunteer man hours and a great debt is owed to those wonderful club men. In 1954, the fine new ground was probably the only ground in Victoria to be independently owned by a football club. The entrance gates were kindly donated by the Italian Community of Myrtleford. In 1974 t he new clubrooms building was named the Len G. Ablett pavilion and was opened by the Honable Rupert Hamer on 15 March 1974.

1953 saw the introduction of a second eighteen competition in the Ovens and Murray. and in 1973 a thirds competition was introduced. Myrtleford appointed a big name coach in 1951 with Alby Rodda who was captain of a Melbourne team and State team. Slowly with his help and other coaches such as Doug Palmer, Jimmy Deane, Ron Branton and Martin Cross, the Myrtleford Football club started to improve. They were always in or about the top four for many years.

Their first and only success to this day was in 1970 against the Wangaratta Rovers. That year Myrtleford finished 3rd on the league ladder and had a daunting task of having to win all their finals games. The Saints were convincing victors over Benalla 11.11 to 7.15. Then came the heart stopper at the Albury Showgrounds in the preliminary final clash against Wodonga Myrtleford scraped home by one point 14.10 to 14.9. Nearly all of Myrtleford were at the Wangaratta Showgrounds for the Grand Final which saw the Saints trail up to three quarter time. The last quarter suddenly saw Myrtleford come alive they were yards faster than the tired Wangaratta Rovers with the Saints forwards on target, they came out on top by 17 points.

1970 - O&MFL Senior Football Premiership Team: Captain/Coach- Martin Cross. P.Quirk, K.Smith, D.Piazza, D.Radford, A.Crisp, A.Heberle, W.Lamb, D.Walker, D.Cooper, J.Pelos, J.Doodewaard, T.Burgess, D.Taylor, N.Holmes, D.Chamberlain, B.Waite, G.Ward, R.Crisp, J.Bianco.

== Premierships ==
- Previous competitions

Competition	Level	Wins	Year won	Runner Up
Ovens District FA	Senior	1	1895	
Ovens Valley FA	Senior	1	1914	
Myrtleford District FA	Senior	1	1923	
Ovens & King FL	Senior	3	1936, 1945, 1949	1933, 1934, 1935, 1937, 1938

- Ovens & Murray Football Netball League
  - Football
    - Seniors: (1) 1970
    - Reserves: (2) 1963, 1966
    - Thirds: (2) 1990, 2019
  - Netball
    - A-Grade: (4) 1995, 1997, 2000, 2003.
    - B-Grade: (2) 2002, 2008.
    - C-Grade: (0)
    - D-Grade: (0)
