= Nathan Ablett =

Australian rules footballer, born 1985

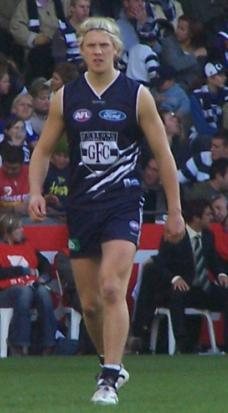
- Nathan Ablett in 2007

Personal information
- Full name: Nathan Ablett
- Born: 13 December 1985 (age 40); Victoria, Australia
- Original team: Modewarre Football Club
- Draft: 49th overall (father–son), 2004; Geelong
- Height: 198 cm (6 ft 6 in)
- Weight: 96 kg (15 st 2 lb; 212 lb)
- Position: Forward

Playing career^{1}
Years	Club	Games (Goals)
2005–2007	Geelong	32 (46)
2011	Gold Coast	2 (1)
Total		34 (47)
- ^{1} Playing statistics correct to the end of 2011.

Career highlights
- AFL premiership player: 2007; AFL Rising Star Nomination (2005)

Nathan Ablett (born 13 December 1985) is a former Australian rules footballer who played for Gold Coast and Geelong in the Australian Football League (AFL).

A key forward, 1.98 metres (6.5 ft) tall and weighing 96 kilograms (210 lb), Nathan is the youngest son of Gary Ablett Sr and the younger brother of Gary Ablett Jr.

Although a standout junior footballer, Ablett chose not to play in the TAC Cup to avoid the media attention which accompanied the preceding careers of his father and brother. After spending a year playing in country leagues, Ablett agreed to sign for Geelong (his former club) under the league's father–son rule and was selected with the 49th overall pick in the 2004 AFL draft. Ablett made his AFL debut in 2005, and was part of the Premiership side in 2007. However, he announced his retirement from professional football at the conclusion of the 2007 season, citing a lack in desire to continue playing at the top level.

Ablett made a short-lived return to the top flight when he joined brother Gary at the Gold Coast Suns in 2011, playing two games before being delisted at the conclusion of the season.

== Early life ==
Though a gifted junior footballer, Ablett avoided media attention surrounding his junior career by choosing not to play in the TAC Cup. He eventually decided to pursue a career in AFL football, though wary of the pressures placed on him as the son of former league superstar Gary Ablett Sr. and brother of rising talent and eventual dual Brownlow Medallist Gary Ablett, Jr. Regarded as a shy personality both on and off the field, Ablett rarely participated in media interviews.

== AFL career ==
Ablett debuted midway through the 2005 AFL season after beginning his professional football career with the Geelong reserves team in the VFL. Nathan showed improvement as a player at the end of the 2006 season in the VFL team which contested the Grand Final. By 2007, Ablett cemented his position in the senior squad at full-forward, including helping the Cats capture the 2007 AFL Premiership by booting three goals in the record-breaking Grand Final win.

=== Retirement ===
On 30 November 2007, Ablett announced he was considering retirement from the game at the age of only 21, citing a lack of continuing passion for the game. This was not without precedent within the family, as Ablett walked away from his TAC Cup team in 2003, but he was eventually convinced to return to top-level competition—at least temporarily. Having been given until the start of 2008 to make a decision, Ablett decided on 7 January 2008 to walk away from AFL for at least one year, but he didn't rule out a possible return at some stage.

In May 2008, media outlets reported Geelong coach Mark Thompson as saying, "I've spoken to him (Nathan Ablett) a few times and it's probably a bit late for this year, for him to play AFL, but that's not the real point, the point is he's missing footy and he is thinking about a return." Nathan re-commenced training with Geelong on 9 July 2008. Although he was expected to play in Geelong's VFL side in the later part of the 2008 season, an ankle injury, sustained from playing basketball, sidelined him for the remainder of the year. It was announced on 2 September 2008 that Nathan would not be pursuing an AFL career in 2009, instead choosing to become a plumber. He subsequently signed with the Broadbeach Cats to play in the AFL Queensland State League.

Ablett returned to AFL football in 2011, signing for the Gold Coast Suns alongside his brother in the club's inaugural AFL season. His Suns debut came in Round 22 against Adelaide, almost four years after his previous AFL appearance. He was delisted at the end of the season, playing only two games for the Suns and kicking one goal.

Ablett played for Victorian Football League side Werribee in 2012.

== Statistics ==
Legend
G	Goals	K	Kicks	D	Disposals	T	Tackles
B	Behinds	H	Handballs	M	Marks

Season	Team	No.	Games	Totals							Averages (per game)						
Season	Team	No.	Games	G	B	K	H	D	M	T	G	B	K	H	D	M	T
2005	Geelong	23	4	8	2	19	8	27	13	5	2.0	0.5	4.8	2.0	6.8	3.3	1.3
2006	Geelong	23	7	4	3	33	23	56	27	5	0.6	0.4	4.7	3.3	8.0	3.9	0.7
2007	Geelong	23	21	34	18	117	74	191	86	28	1.6	0.9	5.6	3.5	9.1	4.1	1.3
2011	Gold Coast	55	2	1	1	9	13	22	5	3	0.5	0.5	4.5	6.5	11.0	2.5	1.5
Career			34	47	24	178	118	296	131	41	1.4	0.7	5.2	3.5	8.7	3.9	1.2
