= Len Ablett =

Australian rules footballer (1916–2006)

Personal information
- Full name: Leonard George Ablett
- Born: 10 May 1916; Myrtleford, Victoria
- Died: 19 December 2006 (aged 90); Wangaratta, Victoria
- Original team: Myrtleford
- Height: 184 cm (6 ft 0 in)
- Weight: 87 kg (192 lb)

Playing career^{1}
| Years | Club | Games (Goals) |
| 1939–1943 | Richmond | 70 (5) |
- ^{1} Playing statistics correct to the end of 1943.

Career highlights
- VFL premiership player: 1943

Leonard George Ablett (10 May 1916 – 19 December 2006) was an Australian rules footballer who played with Richmond in the VFL during the early 1940s.

Ablett joined Richmond from the Victorian town of Myrtleford. He came off the bench as a reserve in Richmond's 1943 premiership side, his last game in the VFL.

Ablett returned to Myrtleford and was the club's best-and-fairest player in its inaugural Ovens and Murray Football League season in 1950.

The pavilion at Myrtleford's home ground of McNamara Reserve was named after him in 1974. He was the club's first life member and served 20 years as president. Ablett also served as a councillor and president with the Shire of Myrtleford.

Ablett was the uncle of mercurial VFL/AFL footballer Gary Ablett Sr. and helped recruit him to Myrtleford for one season in 1983. He was the first member of the famous Ablett family to win a premiership.
