= Geoff Ablett =

Australian rules footballer (1955–2026)

Personal information
- Full name: Geoffrey Norman Ablett
- Born: 13 March 1955; Drouin, Victoria, Australia
- Died: 29 April 2026 (aged 71); Cranbourne, Victoria, Australia
- Original team: Drouin
- Height: 180 cm (5 ft 11 in)
- Weight: 80 kg (176 lb)
- Position: Wing

Playing career
Years	Club	Games (Goals)
1973–1982	Hawthorn	202 (135)
1983–1984	Richmond	16 (12)
1985	St Kilda	11 (6)
Total		229 (153)

Career highlights
- 2× VFL premiership player: 1976, 1978

Geoffrey Norman Ablett (13 March 1955 – 29 April 2026) was an Australian rules footballer who played in the Victorian Football League (VFL) during the 1970s and 1980s. He later served as a member of the Casey City Council.

== Football career ==
Ablett spent the majority of his career with Hawthorn, playing 202 games on the wing. Ablett finished with short stints at Richmond and St Kilda. His younger brother Gary Ablett Sr is a Hall of Fame inductee. A third brother, Kevin, also played for Hawthorn, Richmond and Geelong. Geoff Ablett was known for his burst of speed as player, winning the AFL Grand Final Sprint competition four times.

== Politics and anti-corruption investigation ==
In December 2008 and 2013, Ablett was elected mayor of City of Casey Council, one of Victoria's biggest councils.

Ablett was the unsuccessful Liberal Party candidate for the Electoral district of Cranbourne at both the 2010 and 2014 Victorian state election.

He was a councillor at the City of Casey when it was dismissed in 2020. This dismissal of the council followed an investigation by the Victorian Independent Broad-based Anti-corruption Commission into “allegations property developer John Woodman paid City of Casey councillors in exchange for favourable planning votes.” The hearing heard that Ablett “received more than $300,000 from Mr Woodman”, including “$5,000 a month to look after” a racehorse that Woodman was a part owner of. Ablett responded that racehorses “are very expensive to keep.”

In July 2023, Ablett was named as a key figure in IBAC's Operation Sandon report. He was found to have promoted local developer John Woodman's interests on council in exchange for payment, having 'received more than $500,000 in payments and other financial benefits from Mr Woodman between 2010 and 2019.' Woodman also made donations to Ablett's campaigns when he was the Liberal Party candidate for Cranbourne in 2010 and 2014.

== Personal life and death ==
Ablett was the brother of AFL player Gary Ablett.

His son Ryan, who was once rookie listed at Hawthorn, died in 2009 at the age of 27.

Ablett died from complications of amyotrophic lateral sclerosis (ALS) in Cranbourne on 29 April 2026, at the age of 71.

== Statistics ==
Legend
G	Goals	K	Kicks	D	Disposals	T	Tackles
B	Behinds	H	Handballs	M	Marks

Season	Team	No.	Games	Totals							Averages (per game)						
Season	Team	No.	Games	G	B	K	H	D	M	T	G	B	K	H	D	M	T
1973	Hawthorn	2	7	0	5	71	8	79	17	—N/a	0.0	0.7	10.1	1.1	11.3	2.4	—N/a
1974	Hawthorn	2	25	20	29	364	81	445	65	—N/a	0.8	1.2	14.6	3.2	17.8	2.6	—N/a
1975	Hawthorn	2	22	14	19	304	43	347	60	—N/a	0.6	0.9	14.5	2.0	16.5	2.9	—N/a
1976	Hawthorn	2	23	11	22	365	55	420	58	—N/a	0.5	1.0	15.9	2.4	18.3	2.5	—N/a
1977	Hawthorn	2	24	8	15	395	78	473	75	—N/a	0.3	0.7	16.5	3.3	19.7	3.1	—N/a
1978	Hawthorn	2	25	15	21	354	91	445	62	—N/a	0.6	0.8	14.2	3.6	17.8	2.5	—N/a
1979	Hawthorn	2	16	11	24	231	67	298	46	—N/a	0.7	1.5	14.4	4.2	18.6	2.9	—N/a
1980	Hawthorn	2	19	16	23	274	96	370	66	—N/a	0.8	1.2	14.4	5.1	19.5	3.5	—N/a
1981	Hawthorn	2	17	19	23	273	62	335	43	—N/a	1.1	1.4	16.1	3.6	19.7	2.5	—N/a
1982	Hawthorn	2	24	21	26	360	131	491	89	—N/a	0.9	1.1	15.0	5.5	20.5	3.7	—N/a
1983	Richmond	4	5	8	8	70	21	91	15	—N/a	1.6	1.6	14.0	4.2	18.2	3.0	—N/a
1984	Richmond	4	11	4	9	146	25	171	31	—N/a	0.4	0.8	13.3	2.3	15.5	2.8	—N/a
1985	St Kilda	15	11	6	10	187	31	218	38	—N/a	0.5	0.9	17.0	2.8	19.8	3.5	—N/a
Career			229	153	234	3394	789	4183	665	—N/a	0.7	1.0	14.9	3.5	18.3	2.9	—N/a
