= Kevin Ablett =

Australian rules footballer (1958–2025)

Personal information
- Full name: Kevin Ablett
- Born: 26 March 1958
- Died: 11 October 2025 (aged 67)
- Height: 185 cm (6 ft 1 in)
- Weight: 84.5 kg (186 lb)

Playing career
Years	Club	Games (Goals)
1977–1980	Hawthorn	31 (22)
1984	Richmond	5 (0)
1985	Geelong	2 (0)
Total		38 (22)

Kevin Ablett (26 March 1958 – 11 October 2025) was an Australian rules footballer who played with Hawthorn, Richmond and Geelong in the Victorian Football League (VFL).

== Sources ==
- Holmesby, Russell & Main, Jim (2009). The Encyclopedia of AFL Footballers. 8th ed. Melbourne: Bas Publishing.
- Kevin Ablett's playing statistics from AFL Tables
