= 2012 Geelong Football Club season =

Geelong Football Club
2012 season
- President: Colin Carter
- Coach: Chris Scott (2nd season)
- Captains: Joel Selwood (1st season)
- Home ground: Simonds Stadium
- Pre-season competition: 10th
- AFL season: 6th
- Finals series: Elimination final (week 1)
- Best and Fairest: Tom Hawkins
- Leading goalkicker: Tom Hawkins (62)
- Highest home attendance: 69,231 vs. Hawthorn (Round 2)
- Lowest home attendance: 13,736 vs. Port Adelaide (Round 14)
- Average home attendance: 31,508
- Club membership: 40,205

The 2012 Geelong Football Club season was the club's 113th season of senior competition in the Australian Football League (AFL). The club also fielded its reserves team in the Victorian Football League (VFL) for the 13th season.

== Club personnel ==
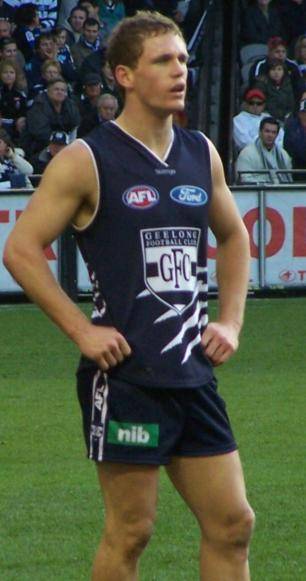
Joel Selwood was appointed club captain prior to the 2012 season.

Following the retirement of incumbent premiership captain Cameron Ling in the off-season, Joel Selwood was appointed the club's new captain in January 2012, with Jimmy Bartel assuming the role of vice-captain. Additionally, Joel Corey, Corey Enright, James Kelly and Harry Taylor remain in the player leadership group from the prior season, with Steve Johnson the sole promotion to the group. Selwood's older brother, Troy, captained the club's VFL team for the second successive season; however due to the departure of Matt Firman, his co-captain from the prior season, it was his first time as sole captain.

The departure of assistant coach Brenton Sanderson to the vacant Adelaide senior coach position in September 2011 resulted in a number of coaching changes for the club, the first being the promotion of the club's VFL coach, Dale Amos, as Sanderson's replacement. Subsequently, Amos was replaced by former Essendon coach Matthew Knights, with former Geelong player Max Rooke also joining the coaching staff as a development coach, working with the younger club players. Assistant coach Matthew Egan also departed the club to take up the same position with Essendon. The remainder of the club's coaching panel remained unchanged from 2011, with Blake Caracella, Nigel Lappin and James Rahilly returning as assistant coaches and Paul Hood continuing his role as academy co-ordinator. Furthermore, Brad Ottens, a former Geelong player who retired in the off-season, also returned to the club in a new role as part-time ruck coach.

=== Playing list ===
The introduction of Greater Western Sydney as the league's eighteenth club this season created the possibility that Geelong could again lose an uncontracted player to a new club, as had previously occurred when Gold Coast entered the league the prior season and signed Gary Ablett. Despite this not eventuating, Geelong still lost six players on its list due to retirement, including premiership players Cameron Ling (captain), Darren Milburn, Cameron Mooney, Brad Ottens and Mark Blake, as well as Marcus Drum, who did not play a senior game for the club. Additionally, Geelong delisted two rookie-listed players: Ben Johnson and Jack Weston.

Geelong's participation in the trade week was minimal, with no incoming or outgoing trades finalised. It did however secure Jed Bews, son of former player Andrew, under the father–son rule. In addition to using its last pick (86) on Bews, a further five players were drafted by the club in the 2011 National Draft: Joel Hamling (pick 32), Shane Kersten (34), Jordan Murdoch (48), Lincoln McCarthy (66) and Orren Stephenson (78). With the club choosing not to promote any rookies, it subsequently drafted Cameron Eardley (pick 18) and Jackson Sheringham (36) in the 2012 Rookie Draft, as well as a steeplechase runner, Mark Blicavs (54). Geelong did not participate in the corresponding Pre-season Draft.

Playing statistics

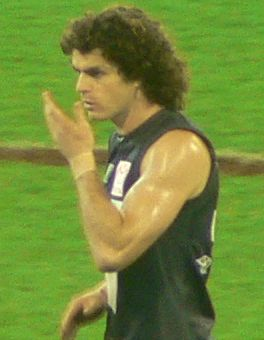
Matthew Scarlett retains his veteran-listed status for Geelong in 2012.

Players are listed in alphabetical order by surname, and statistics are for AFL regular season and finals series matches during the 2012 AFL season only.

^	Denotes player who is on the club's rookie list
#	Denotes nominated rookie where player has been elevated to club's senior list during season, and therefore eligible for senior selection.
†	Denotes player who is on the club's veteran list

Geelong's 2012 playing list
Player	#	AFL debut	Games	Goals	Behinds	Kicks	Handballs	Disposals	Marks	Tackles
Jimmy Bartel	3	2002	20	12	10	230	190	420	101	121
Ryan Bathie^	47	—N/a								
Jed Bews	24	—N/a								
Mark Blicavs^	48	—N/a								
Mitch Brown	1	2011	3	2	2	16	7	23	11	4
George Burbury^	43	—N/a								
Shannon Byrnes	17	2004	4	1	2	18	22	40	10	12
Paul Chapman	35	2000	21	36	15	292	136	428	107	94
Allen Christensen	28	2011	17	9	9	166	163	329	47	63
Joel Corey †	11	2000	20	3	5	189	239	428	54	103
Josh Cowan	18	2011								
Mitch Duncan	22	2010	22	20	12	262	138	400	122	68
Cameron Eardley^	37	—N/a								
Corey Enright	44	2001	22	2	3	283	179	462	126	53
Tom Gillies	25	2009	5	1	0	40	33	73	26	9
Cameron Guthrie	29	2011	18	1	0	100	97	197	42	44
Joel Hamling	45	—N/a								
Tom Hawkins	26	2007	22	62	38	198	80	278	144	25
Simon Hogan	34	2009								
George Horlin-Smith	33	2012	3	2	1	20	17	37	12	3
Josh Hunt	8	2001	18	5	5	185	97	282	106	43
Taylor Hunt	19	2010	21	8	6	146	170	316	75	70
Steve Johnson	20	2002	21	19	17	299	166	465	117	94
James Kelly	9	2002	19	2	5	257	213	470	59	128
Shane Kersten	39	—N/a								
Tom Lonergan	13	2005	22	3	2	144	107	251	98	40
Andrew Mackie	4	2004	23	12	7	311	120	431	123	60
Lincoln McCarthy	6	2012	1	0	0	3	3	6	3	0
Daniel Menzel	10	2010								
Steven Motlop	32	2010	22	26	14	192	104	296	52	52
Jordan Murdoch	21	2012	8	4	3	67	35	102	33	24
James Podsiadly	31	2010	18	35	13	153	62	215	90	50
Matthew Scarlett †	30	1998	16	0	0	169	75	244	89	40
Jordan Schroder	15	2012	1	0	0	4	7	11	1	2
Joel Selwood	14	2007	21	13	12	293	246	539	74	118
Jackson Sheringham#	38	2012	5	1	1	28	28	56	13	14
Jonathan Simpkin#^{[a]}	46	2012	4	1	0	22	13	35	8	7
Dawson Simpson	16	2010	2	0	1	4	4	8	3	4
Billie Smedts	2	2012	14	6	9	94	72	166	43	40
Orren Stephenson	23	2012	8	1	1	34	34	68	19	20
Mathew Stokes	27	2006	20	15	6	149	161	310	70	63
Jesse Stringer#^{[b]}	41	2012	8	3	4	48	52	100	20	30
Harry Taylor	7	2008	22	15	5	205	152	357	135	48
Travis Varcoe	5	2007	1	0	0	1	1	2	0	1
Nathan Vardy	36	2011	2	2	1	11	2	13	5	3
Josh Walker#	42	2012	7	3	4	37	21	58	16	22
Trent West	12	2008	21	8	7	103	112	215	59	52
David Wojcinski	40	1999	4	0	1	33	22	55	13	14

== Season summary ==
=== Pre-season matches ===
Geelong's 2012 NAB Cup fixture (Week 1 – Lightning matches)
Round	Date and local time	Opponent	Scores^{[c]}			Venue	Attendance	Ladder position	Ref
Round	Date and local time	Opponent	Home	Away	Result	Venue	Attendance	Ladder position	Ref
1	Friday, 24 February (7:45 pm)	Sydney	0.2.1 (13)	0.4.5 (29)	Won by 16 points	Etihad Stadium [A]	17,583	13th	
1	Friday, 24 February (8:50 pm)	St Kilda	1.3.9 (36)	1.0.6 (15)	Lost by 21 points	Etihad Stadium [A]	18,880	13th	

Geelong's 2012 NAB Cup fixture (Weeks 2, 3 & 4 – Full-length matches)
Round	Date and local time	Opponent	Scores^{[c]}			Venue	Attendance	Ladder position	Ref
Round	Date and local time	Opponent	Home	Away	Result	Venue	Attendance	Ladder position	Ref
2	Friday, 2 March (7:40 pm)	Gold Coast	1.8.12 (69)	1.16.13 (118)	Won by 49 points	Metricon Stadium [A]	5,381	5th	
3	Saturday, 10 March (3:10 pm)	Richmond	0.6.13 (49)	1.14.15 (108)	Lost by 59 points	Simonds Stadium [H]	9,393	10th	
4	Saturday, 17 March (3:10 pm)	Western Bulldogs	11.18 (84)	11.9 (75)	Won by 9 points	Simonds Stadium [H]	3,800 (approx.)	—N/a	

=== Regular season ===
Geelong's 2012 AFL season fixture
Round	Date and local time	Opponent	Home	Away	Result	Venue	Attendance	Ladder position	Ref
Round	Date and local time	Opponent	Scores^{[c]}			Venue	Attendance	Ladder position	Ref
1	Saturday, 31 March (4:40 pm)	Fremantle	16.9 (105)	15.11 (101)	Lost by 4 points	Patersons Stadium [A]	34,601	11th	
2	Monday, 9 April (3:10 pm)	Hawthorn	14.8 (92)	13.12 (90)	Won by 2 points	MCG [H]	69,231	10th	
3	Sunday, 15 April (4:40 pm)	North Melbourne	20.11 (131)	16.18 (114)	Lost by 17 points	Etihad Stadium [A]	29,630	11th	
4	Sunday, 22 April (1:10 pm)	Richmond	11.9 (75)	9.11 (65)	Won by 10 points	Simonds Stadium [H]	Unconfirmed	10th	
5	Saturday, 28 April (7:40 pm)	Brisbane Lions	4.17 (41)	12.7 (79)	Won by 38 points	The Gabba [A]	15,528	8th	
6	Saturday, 5 May (1:45 pm)	Melbourne	17.17 (119)	11.10 (76)	Won by 43 points	Simonds Stadium [H]	18,010	6th	
7	Saturday, 12 May (12:45 pm)^{[d]}	Adelaide	19.8 (122)	10.12 (72)	Lost by 50 points	AAMI Stadium [A]	35,535	10th	
8	Friday, 18 May (7:50 pm)	Collingwood	14.12 (96)	11.18 (84)	Lost by 12 points	MCG [A]	75,650	10th	
9	Friday, 25 May (7:50 pm)	Western Bulldogs	11.9 (75)	14.11 (95)	Won by 20 points	Etihad Stadium [A]	29,118	9th	
10	Saturday, 2 June (1:45 pm)	Greater Western Sydney	19.12 (126)	9.7 (61)	Won by 65 points	Simonds Stadium [H]	17,243	8th	
11	Friday, 8 June (7:50 pm)	Carlton	11.19 (85)	14.13 (97)	Won by 12 points	Etihad Stadium [A]	47,632	7th	
12	Bye							7th	
13	Friday, 22 June (7:50 pm)	Sydney	12.8 (80)	11.8 (74)	Lost by 6 points	SCG [A]	27,400	7th	
14	Sunday, 1 July (1:10 pm)	Port Adelaide	14.15 (99)	8.13 (61)	Won by 38 points	Simonds Stadium [H]	13,736	7th	
15	Sunday, 8 July (3:15 pm)	Gold Coast	13.18 (96)	15.20 (110)	Won by 14 points	Metricon Stadium [A]	15,824	7th	
16	Saturday, 14 July (7:40 pm)	Collingwood	10.19 (79)	17.8 (110)	Lost by 31 points	MCG [H]	61,717	7th	
17	Friday, 20 July (7:50 pm)	Essendon	20.14 (134)	10.7 (67)	Won by 67 points	Etihad Stadium [H]	50,066	7th	
18	Saturday, 28 July (1:45 pm)	Adelaide	15.12 (102)	11.9 (75)	Won by 27 points	Simonds Stadium [H]	18,377	6th	
19	Friday, 3 August (7:50 pm)	Hawthorn	17.14 (116)	18.10 (118)	Won by 2 points	MCG [A]	65,287	6th	
20	Friday, 10 August (6:40 pm)	West Coast	16.6 (102)	15.7 (97)	Lost by 5 points	Patersons Stadium [A]	37,812	7th	
21	Friday, 17 August (7:50 pm)	St Kilda	18.15 (123)	11.15 (81)	Won by 42 points	Etihad Stadium [H]	38,169	7th	
22	Sunday, 26 August (1:10 pm)	Western Bulldogs	16.11 (107)	11.7 (73)	Won by 34 points	Simonds Stadium [H]	18,047	6th	
23	Saturday, 1 September (1:45 pm)	Sydney	17.10 (112)	11.12 (78)	Won by 34 points	Simonds Stadium [H]	20,045	6th	

==== Ladder ====
2012 AFL ladder
Pos	Team	Pld	W	L	D	PF	PA	PP	Pts	
1	Hawthorn	22	17	5	0	2679	1733	154.6	68	Finals series
2	Adelaide	22	17	5	0	2428	1833	132.5	68	Finals series
3	Sydney (P)	22	16	6	0	2290	1629	140.6	64	Finals series
4	Collingwood	22	16	6	0	2123	1823	116.5	64	Finals series
5	West Coast	22	15	7	0	2244	1807	124.2	60	Finals series
6	Geelong	22	15	7	0	2209	1886	117.1	60	Finals series
7	Fremantle	22	14	8	0	1956	1691	115.7	56	Finals series
8	North Melbourne	22	14	8	0	2359	2097	112.5	56	Finals series
9	St Kilda	22	12	10	0	2347	1903	123.3	48	
10	Carlton	22	11	11	0	2079	1925	108.0	44	
11	Essendon	22	11	11	0	2091	2090	100.0	44	
12	Richmond	22	10	11	1	2169	1943	111.6	42	
13	Brisbane Lions	22	10	12	0	1904	2092	91.0	40	
14	Port Adelaide	22	5	16	1	1691	2144	78.9	22	
15	Western Bulldogs	22	5	17	0	1542	2301	67.0	20	
16	Melbourne	22	4	18	0	1580	2341	67.5	16	
17	Gold Coast	22	3	19	0	1509	2481	60.8	12	
18	Greater Western Sydney	22	2	20	0	1270	2751	46.2	8	

Rules for classification: 1) points; 2) percentage; 3) number of points for.
(P) Premiers

=== Finals series ===
Geelong's 2012 AFL finals series matches
Round	Date and local time	Opponent	Scores^{[c]}			Venue	Ref
Round	Date and local time	Opponent	Home	Away	Result	Venue	Ref
Second elimination final	Saturday, 8 September (7:45 pm)	Fremantle	11.14 (80)	14.12 (96)	Lost by 16 points	MCG [H]	
Geelong were eliminated from the 2012 AFL finals series

== Teams ==
Geelong's 2012 teams (Rounds 1 to 4)

Geelong's Round 1 team				Geelong's Round 2 team			Geelong's Round 3 team			Geelong's Round 4 team
B:	Smedts	Lonergan	Scarlett	Enright	Lonergan	Guthrie	Enright	Lonergan	Guthrie	Enright	Lonergan	Guthrie
HB:	Mackie	Taylor	Enright	Mackie	Taylor	T. Hunt	T. Hunt	Taylor	Mackie (substituted off)	Mackie	Taylor	Gillies
C:	T. Hunt	Chapman	Kelly	Corey	Selwood	Motlop	Motlop	Selwood	Corey	T. Hunt	Corey	Christensen
HF:	Stokes	Hawkins	Johnson	Stokes	Hawkins	Christensen	Christensen	Hawkins	Chapman	Chapman	Hawkins	Duncan
F:	West	Podsiadly	Motlop	Chapman	Podsiadly	Johnson	Johnson	Podsiadly	West	Johnson	Podsiadly	Stokes
Foll:	Stephenson (substituted off)	Selwood	Bartel	West	Bartel	Kelly	Stephenson	Bartel	Kelly	West	Bartel	Selwood
Int:	Corey	Duncan	Guthrie	Byrnes	Duncan	Smedts (substituted off)	Byrnes	Duncan	Gillies	Horlin-Smith (substituted off)	J. Hunt	Motlop
Sub:	Christensen (substituted on)			Brown (substituted on) 4th'			Horlin-Smith (substituted on) 3rd'			Stringer (substituted on) 4th'
Emg:	Brown	Byrnes	Gillies	~~Byrnes~~	Hogan	Horlin-Smith	Brown	Hogan	Schroder	Byrnes	Schroder	Stephenson
Coach:	Chris Scott			Chris Scott			Chris Scott			Chris Scott
▲ In:	N/A			Brown, Byrnes (late change)			Gillies, Horlin-Smith, Stephenson			J. Hunt, Stokes, Stringer
▼ Out:	N/A			Scarlett, Stephenson (late change)			Brown, Smedts, Stokes			Byrnes, Kelly, Stephenson

Geelong's 2012 teams (Rounds 5 to 8)

Geelong's Round 5 team				Geelong's Round 6 team			Geelong's Round 7 team			Geelong's Round 8 team
B:	Guthrie	Lonergan	Enright	J. Hunt	Taylor	Scarlett	J. Hunt	Taylor	Gillies	Guthrie	Lonergan	J. Hunt
HB:	Taylor	Scarlett	Mackie	Enright	Gillies	Mackie	Enright	Lonergan	Mackie	Enright	Taylor	Mackie
C:	Christensen	Corey	T. Hunt	Corey	Christensen	Kelly	Corey	Christensen	Kelly	Kelly	Selwood	Bartel
HF:	Motlop	Hawkins	Chapman	Motlop	Podsiadly	Duncan	Motlop	Podsiadly	Duncan	Johnson	Podsiadly	Motlop
F:	Stokes (substituted off)	Podsiadly	Johnson	Johnson	Hawkins	Brown	Johnson	Hawkins	Guthrie	Chapman	Hawkins	Stokes
Foll:	West	Bartel	Selwood	West	Bartel (substituted off)	Chapman	West	Selwood	Chapman	West	Corey	T. Hunt
Int:	Duncan	J. Hunt	Stringer	Byrnes	Smedts	Stringer	T. Hunt	Stringer	Smedts	Duncan	Smedts (substituted off)	Stephenson
Sub:	Smedts (substituted on) 3rd'			Guthrie (substituted on) 3rd'			Byrnes (substituted on) 3rd'			Stringer (substituted on) 3rd'
Emg:	Gillies	Horlin-Smith	Stephenson	~~Byrnes~~	~~Gillies~~	Horlin-Smith	~~Byrnes~~	~~Gillies~~	Horlin-Smith	Byrnes	Horlin-Smith	~~Smedts~~
Coach:	Chris Scott			Chris Scott			Chris Scott			Chris Scott
▲ In:	Scarlett, Smedts			Brown, Kelly, Byrnes, Gillies (late changes)			T. Hunt, Lonergan, Selwood			Bartel, Scarlett, Stokes, Stephenson
▼ Out:	Gillies, Horlin-Smith			T. Hunt, Stokes, Lonergan, Selwood (late changes)			Brown, Bartel, Scarlett (late changes)			Byrnes, Christensen, Gillies

Geelong's 2012 teams (Rounds 9 to 12)

Geelong's Round 9 team				Geelong's Round 10 team			Geelong's Round 11 team			Geelong's Round 12 team
B:	Scarlett	Lonergan	J. Hunt	J. Hunt	Lonergan	Scarlett	J. Hunt	Lonergan	Scarlett	Bye
HB:	Mackie	Taylor	Enright	Mackie	Taylor	T. Hunt	Wojcinski	Taylor	Enright	Bye
C:	Johnson	Selwood	Bartel	Chapman	Johnson	Stringer	Chapman	Selwood	T. Hunt	Bye
HF:	Guthrie	Podsiadly	Motlop	Kelly	West	Stokes	Duncan	Hawkins	Stokes	Bye
F:	Stephenson	Hawkins	Stokes	Gillies	Podsiadly	Guthrie	Johnson	West	Motlop	Bye
Foll:	West (substituted off)	Corey	T. Hunt	Stephenson	Selwood	Bartel	Stephenson	Corey	Bartel	Bye
Int:	Chapman	Duncan	Stringer	Duncan	Schroder (substituted off)	Smedts	Guthrie	Kelly	Mackie	Bye
Sub:	Simpkin (substituted on) 4th'			McCarthy (substituted on) 4th'			Stringer (substituted on) 3rd'			Bye
Emg:	Byrnes	Horlin-Smith	Smedts	~~Gillies~~	~~Smedts~~	~~Stringer~~	Gillies	Smedts	~~Stringer~~	Bye
Coach:	Chris Scott			Chris Scott			Chris Scott			Bye
▲ In:	Scarlett, Simpkin			Kelly, McCarthy, Schroder, Gillies, Smedts (late changes)			Corey, Enright, Hawkins, Motlop, Wojciniski			Bye
▼ Out:	Kelly, Smedts			Hawkins, Simpkin; Corey, Enright, Motlop (late changes)			Gillies, McCarthy, Schroder, Smedts, Podsiadly (late change)			Bye

Geelong's 2012 teams (Rounds 13 to 16)

Geelong's Round 13 team				Geelong's Round 14 team			Geelong's Round 15 team			Geelong's Round 16 team
B:	Lonergan	Scarlett	Enright	Enright	Scarlett	Murdoch	Enright	Scarlett	Murdoch	Corey	Lonergan	Scarlett
HB:	Mackie	Taylor	J. Hunt	Corey	Taylor	Horlin-Smith	J. Hunt	Lonergan	T. Hunt	Enright	J. Hunt	Taylor
C:	T. Hunt	Kelly	Wojcinski	Motlop	Kelly	Christensen	Motlop	Kelly	Christensen	Mackie	Kelly	T. Hunt
HF:	Motlop	Podsiadly	Stokes	Mackie	Podsiadly	Murdoch	Mackie	Chapman	Stokes	Motlop	Hawkins	Smedts
F:	Johnson	Hawkins	Chapman	Johnson	Hawkins	Duncan	Corey	Hawkins	Brown	Chapman	Walker	Christensen
Foll:	Simpson (substituted off)	Selwood	Bartel	West	Selwood	Bartel	West	Selwood	Bartel	West	Selwood	Johnson
Int:	Corey	Duncan	West	Guthrie	T. Hunt (substituted off)	Smedts	Simpson (substituted off)	Smedts	Wojcinski	Duncan	Guthrie	Stokes (substituted off)
Sub:	Christensen (substituted on) 3rd'			Stokes (substituted on) 4th'			Guthrie (substituted on) 3rd'			Sheringham (substituted on) 3rd'
Emg:	Guthrie	Horlin-Smith	McCarthy	Byrnes	Simpson	Wojcinski	~~Brown~~	~~Guthrie~~	~~Wojcinski~~	Murdoch	Schroder	Simpson
Coach:	Chris Scott			Chris Scott			Chris Scott			Chris Scott
▲ In:	Christensen, Podsiadly, Simpson			Guthrie, Horlin-Smith, Murdoch, Smedts			Chapman, J. Hunt, Simpson, Brown, Wojcinski (late changes)			Duncan, Johnson, Sheringham, Taylor, Walker
▼ Out:	Guthrie, Stephenson, Stringer			Chapman, J. Hunt, Simpson, Wojcinski			Duncan, Podsiadly, Horlin-Smith, Johnson, Taylor (late changes)			Bartel, Brown, Murdoch, Simpson, Wojcinski

Geelong's 2012 teams (Rounds 17 to 20)

Geelong's Round 17 team				Geelong's Round 18 team			Geelong's Round 19 team			Geelong's Round 20 team
B:	Corey	Lonergan	Scarlett	Corey	Lonergan	Enright	Lonergan	Scarlett	J. Hunt (substituted off)	Guthrie	Lonergan	Scarlett
HB:	Enright	J. Hunt	Taylor	Kelly	J. Hunt	Taylor	Mackie	Taylor	Enright	T. Hunt	Taylor	Enright
C:	Mackie	T. Hunt	Stokes	Mackie	T. Hunt	Stokes	T. Hunt	Selwood	Sheringham	Motlop	Johnson	Mackie
HF:	Motlop	Hawkins	Smedts	Bartel	Hawkins	Motlop	Smedts	Podsiadly	Christensen	Sheringham	Podsiadly	Bartel
F:	Chapman	Walker	Duncan	Chapman	Walker	Guthrie	Stokes	Hawkins	Chapman	Walker	Hawkins (substituted off)	Stokes
Foll:	West	Selwood	Johnson (substituted off)	West	Selwood	Johnson (substituted off)	Stephenson	Kelly	Johnson	Stephenson	Selwood	Duncan
Int:	Kelly	Murdoch	Sheringham	Christensen	Duncan	Smedts	Bartel	Duncan	Walker	Christensen	Murdoch	Simpkin
Sub:	Guthrie (substituted on) 3rd'			Sheringham (substituted on) 1st'			Motlop (substituted on) 3rd'			Wojcinski (substituted on) 1st'
Emg:	Brown	Horlin-Smith	Schroder	Brown	Murdoch	Podsiadly	Brown	Guthrie	Murdoch	Brown	Schroder	~~Wojcinski~~
Coach:	Chris Scott			Chris Scott			Chris Scott			Chris Scott
▲ In:	Murdoch			Bartel, Christensen			Podsiadly, Scarlett, Stephenson			Guthrie, Murdoch, Simpkin, Wojcinski (late change)
▼ Out:	Christensen			Murdoch, Scarlett			Corey, Guthrie, West			J. Hunt, Kelly, Smedts, Chapman (late change)

Geelong's 2012 teams (Rounds 21 to 23; Elimination final)

Geelong's Round 21 team				Geelong's Round 22 team			Geelong's Round 23 team			Geelong's Elimination final team
B:	J. Hunt	Lonergan	Scarlett	J. Hunt	Lonergan	Murdoch	J. Hunt	Lonergan	Scarlett	J. Hunt	Lonergan	Scarlett
HB:	Enright	Taylor	Mackie	Enright	Taylor	Mackie	Enright	Taylor	T. Hunt	Enright	Taylor	Mackie
C:	Corey (substituted off)	T. Hunt	Duncan	Duncan	Corey	Guthrie	Bartel	Selwood	Duncan	T. Hunt	Selwood	Christensen
HF:	Chapman	Podsiadly	Motlop	Chapman	Podsiadly	Motlop	Mackie	Christensen	Stokes	Bartel	Podsiadly	Stokes
F:	Bartel	Hawkins	Stokes	Bartel	Hawkins	Stokes	Chapman	Hawkins	Podsiadly	Chapman	Hawkins	Vardy
Foll:	West	Selwood	Kelly	West	Johnson	Kelly	Vardy (substituted off)	Johnson	Corey	West	Kelly	Corey
Int:	Johnson	Murdoch	Walker	Christensen	Walker	Varcoe	Kelly	Murdoch	West	Duncan	Motlop	Murdoch
Sub:	Simpkin (substituted on) 4th'			Smedts (substituted on) 2nd'			Motlop (substituted on) 4th'			Simpkin (substituted on) 3rd'
Emg:	Guthrie	Sheringham	Wojcinski	~~Guthrie~~	Simpkin	~~Smedts~~	Guthrie	Walker	Wojcinski	Guthrie	Walker	Wojcinski
Coach:	Chris Scott			Chris Scott			Chris Scott
▲ In:	Chapman, Corey, J. Hunt, Kelly, West			Christensen, Varcoe, Guthrie, Smedts (late changes)			T. Hunt, Scarlett, Selwood, Vardy			Simpkin
▼ Out:	Christensen, Guthrie, Sheringham, Stephenson, Wojcinski			Selwood, Simpkin, T. Hunt, Scarlett (late changes)			Guthrie, Smedts, Varcoe, Walker			Johnson

== Awards and records ==
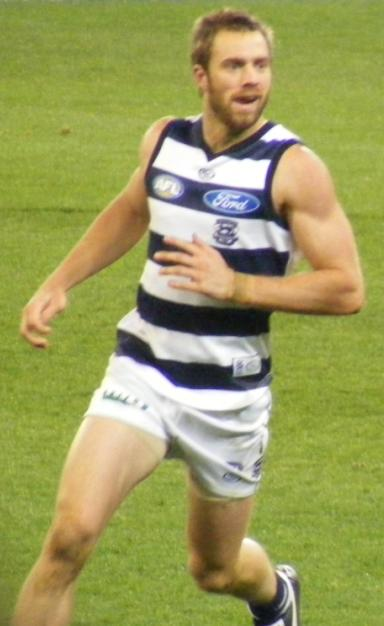
Joel Corey celebrated his 250th AFL game for Geelong in round 18.

Milestones

- Round 1 – Billie Smedts (AFL debut), Orren Stephenson (AFL debut)
- Round 3 – George Horlin-Smith (AFL debut)
- Round 4 – Jesse Stringer (AFL debut)
- Round 8 – James Kelly (200 games), James Podsiadly (50 games)
- Round 9 – Jonathan Simpkin (AFL debut)
- Round 10 – Harry Taylor (100 games), Lincoln McCarthy (AFL debut), Jordan Schroder (AFL debut)
- Round 11 – David Wojcinski (200 games)
- Round 14 – Jordan Murdoch (AFL debut)
- Round 16 – Jackson Sheringham (AFL debut), Josh Walker (AFL debut)
- Round 18 – Joel Corey (250 games)
- Round 23 – Tom Hawkins (100 games), Mitch Duncan (50 games)

AFL awards

- Member of the 2012 All-Australian team (full-forward) – Tom Hawkins
- AFLPA Robert Rose Award for Most Courageous Player – Joel Selwood (tied with West Coast's Beau Waters)

Other

- Tom Hawkins – 2012 AFL Mark of the Year (Round 2 nomination)
- Steven Motlop – 2012 AFL Goal of the Year (Round 3 nomination)
- James Podsiadly – 2012 AFL Mark of the Year (Round 3 nomination)
- Steven Motlop – 2012 AFL Rising Star (Round 6 nomination)
- Matthew Scarlett – 2012 AFL Mark of the Year (Round 13 nomination)
- Tom Hawkins – 2012 AFL Mark of the Year (Round 15 nomination)

== Match Review Panel and Tribunal cases ==
Summary of club charges
Total charges	15
Total guilty charges	14
Total matches suspended	10
Total fines	$3,150

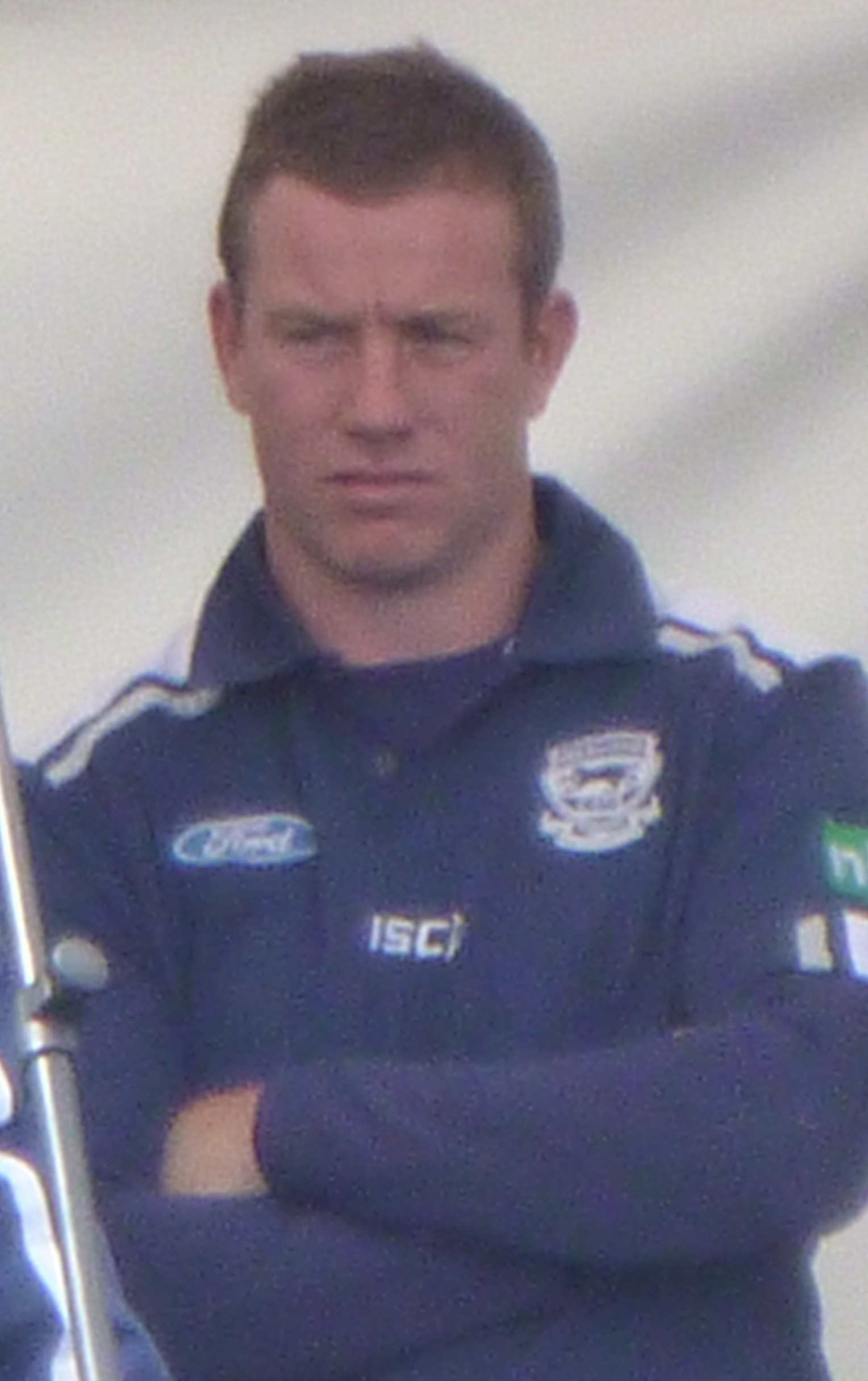
Steve Johnson has been charged with three separate incidents this season, the most of a Geelong player.

Pre-season competition – Week 1

- Josh Hunt was charged with a level two engaging in rough conduct offence against Luke Parker (Sydney). By entering an early plea, Hunt consequentially accepted a two-match suspension and 43.52 points^{[e]} towards his future record; the severity of the sanction a result of his existing bad judiciary record.

Pre-season competition – Week 4

- Joel Selwood was fined $900 for his involvement in wrestling with Liam Picken (Western Bulldogs), in which he accepted with an early plea.

Round 1

- James Kelly received a reprimand and 93.75 demerit points as a result of a level two striking charge against Tendai Mzungu (Fremantle), in which he pleaded guilty.
- Matthew Scarlett also accepted a sanction for a striking offence, in this case a level four charge against Hayden Ballantyne (Fremantle). His poor judiciary record resulted in a three-match suspension with an additional 33.52 carry-over points towards his future record.

Round 4

- Steve Johnson was charged with two separate incidents in the one match, the first being a level-one rough conduct offence against Chris Newman, as well as a level-one tripping offence against Daniel Jackson (both of Richmond). Johnson accepted a reprimand and 78 points towards his future record for the tripping offence, but successfully contested the rough conduct charge at the tribunal, resulting in no action taken. As the two cases would have been merged to create an overall penalty, an early plea for both offences would have resulted in a combined points accumulation of 199.88 which is a one match suspension, and leaving Johnson with 99.88 carry-over points for a period of a year.
- Trent West was charged with a level-one engaging in rough conduct offence against Ty Vickery (Richmond); by entering an early plea, West accepted a reprimand and 70.31 points towards his future record.

Round 7

- Joel Corey was charged with "making an obscene gesture" and subsequently accepted a $900 fine with an early plea.

Round 11

- Josh Hunt accepted a $1,350 fine for a misconduct offence in which he stood on opponent Eddie Betts (Carlton)

Round 15

- Jimmy Bartel was charged with a level-four striking offence against Trent McKenzie (Gold Coast) in which he received a two-match suspension and 43.75 points towards his future record following his submission of an early guilty plea.

Round 17

- Matthew Scarlett was suspended for the second time this season following a level two striking offence against Cory Dell'Olio (Essendon). To avoid a possible two-match sanction, Scarlett entered an early guilty plea accepting a one-match suspension and 65.77 points towards his future record.

Round 20

- Joel Selwood was charged with a level-one misconduct offence against his brother Adam Selwood (West Coast) for making "unnecessary or unreasonable contact with an injured player". Selwood entered an early plea and consequentially accepted a reprimand and 84 points towards his future record. This was despite club coach Chris Scott publicly stating that the guilty plea "doesn't mean we agree with the decision", but rather that the club was not prepared to take the risk that Selwood would be suspended for the following round's match. Selwood also remained eligible for the 2012 Brownlow Medal by entering an early guilty plea.

Round 23

- Paul Chapman received a reprimand and 60 points towards his future record by entering an early guilty plea for a level-one striking offence against Ben McGlynn (Sydney).
- Steve Johnson was charged with engaging in rough conduct (a level one offence) against Dan Hannebery (Sydney) which attracted a one-match sanction and 180.38 carry-over points with an early plea. Due to his previous charge this season, rather than risking a two-match suspension by taking the case to the tribunal, Johnson and the club accepted the early plea offer.

In response to the charges on Chapman and Johnson, club football manager Neil Balme publicly criticised the Match Review Panel stating "we [the club] certainly aren't happy with it" and that despite the club's acceptance of the sanctions, they would have preferred to challenge Johnson's charge in terms of justice, but couldn't justify the risk. Balme claimed that Chapman's incident was "accidental at worst" and that Hannebery, due to a lack of awareness, had caused Johnson's offence himself.

Elimination final

- James Kelly was charged with a level one bumping or making forceful contact from front-on offence against Tendai Mzungu (Fremantle) and was offered a one-match sanction and 64.06 carry-over points by the Match Review Panel, which he accepted with an early plea. As a result, he will miss the opening round of the 2013 AFL season.

== VFL season ==
Former Essendon coach Matthew Knights replaced Dale Amos as coach of the club's VFL team.

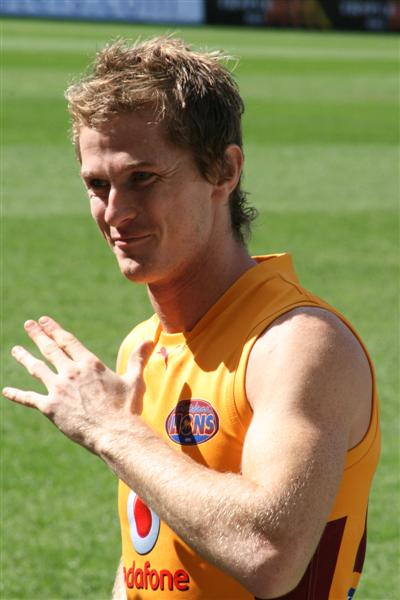
Geelong's VFL captain and former AFL player for the Brisbane Lions, Troy Selwood.

=== Squad ===
The 2012 VFL squad was named on 13 March 2012 and consists of 21 players, nine of whom were retained from the prior season. Senior and rookie-listed players for Geelong's AFL team are also eligible for selection in VFL matches. Additionally, potential father–son draftee Jordon Bourke (son of Damian) was granted special permission by the AFL to play two games for Geelong's VFL team in rounds 18 and 19.

- Andrew Banjanin
- Jaxson Barham
- Dyson Bell-Warren
- Heath Brown
- Ben Capra
- Rob Condy
- Mark Corrigan
- Daniel Gibbs
- Dominic Gleeson
- Mitch Herbison
- Darcy Holden
- Jack Hollmer
- Ben Johnson
- Tommy Maas
- Andrew McLean
- Ben Raidme
- Troy Selwood
- Jack Shannahan
- Matthew Sully
- Casey Tutungi
- Tom Williams

=== Results ===
Geelong's VFL practice matches
Week	Date and local time	Opponent	Scores^{[c]}			Venue	Ref
Week	Date and local time	Opponent	Home	Away	Result	Venue	Ref
1	Saturday, 25 February (11:00 am)	Collingwood	6.14 (50)	8.7 (55)	Lost by 5 points	Simonds Stadium [H]	
2	Saturday, 3 March (11:00 am)	Bendigo Bombers	9.11 (65)	4.3 (27)	Won by 38 points	Simonds Stadium [H]	
3	Saturday, 10 March (11:30 am)	Coburg	15.11 (101)	4.7 (31)	Won by 60 points	Simonds Stadium [H]	
4	Sunday, 18 March (11:00 am)	Collingwood	12.14 (86)	9.7 (61)	Won by 25 points	Simonds Stadium [H]	

Geelong's 2012 VFL season fixture
Round	Date and local time	Opponent	Home	Away	Result	Venue	Ladder position	Ref
Round	Date and local time	Opponent	Scores^{[c]}			Venue	Ladder position	Ref
1	—	Bye	—	—	—	—	11th	
2	Saturday, 31 March (1:00 pm)	Collingwood	14.11 (95)	11.17 (83)	Won by 12 points	Simonds Stadium [H]	5th	
3	Sunday, 8 April (2:00 pm)	Williamstown	11.12 (78)	11.19 (85)	Won by 7 points	Spring Creek Reserve, Torquay [A]	4th	
4	Saturday, 14 April (1:00 pm)	Frankston	17.11 (113)	12.9 (81)	Won by 32 points	Simonds Stadium [H]	2nd	
5	Friday, 20 April (7:40 pm)	Werribee	17.10 (112)	10.15 (75)	Lost by 37 points	Avalon Airport Oval [A]	3rd	
6	Friday, 27 April (6:30 pm)	Bendigo	8.13 (61)	23.9 (147)	Won by 86 points	Queen Elizabeth Oval [A]	2nd	
7	Saturday, 5 May (10:00 am)	Casey	4.10 (94)	22.8 (140)	Lost by 46 points	Simonds Stadium [H]	4th	
8	—	Bye	—	—	—	—	4th	
9	Sunday, 20 May (2:00 pm)	Sandringham	16.10 (112)	15.18 (108)	Lost by 4 points	Trevor Barker Beach Oval [A]	7th	
10	Saturday, 2 June (10:00 am)	North Ballarat	13.16 (94)	18.10 (118)	Lost by 24 points	Simonds Stadium [H]	7th	
11	Saturday, 9 June (1:00 pm)	Port Melbourne	16.10 (106)	13.7 (85)	Won by 21 points	Simonds Stadium [H]	6th	
12	—	Bye	—	—	—	—	7th	
13	Saturday, 23 June (2:00 pm)	Northern Blues	2.9 (21)	9.18 (72)	Won by 51 points	Visy Park [A]	6th	
14	Sunday, 1 July (2:00 pm)	Coburg	5.5 (35)	10.21 (81)	Won by 46 points	Reid Oval, Warrnambool [A]	4th	
15	Saturday, 7 July (1:00 pm)	Box Hill	21.13 (139)	13.10 (88)	Won by 51 points	Simonds Stadium [H]	4th	
16	Saturday, 14 July (1:00 pm)	Collingwood	7.6 (48)	11.18 (84)	Won by 36 points	Victoria Park [A]	4th	
17	—	Bye	—	—	—	—	4th	
18	Saturday, 28 July (10:00 am)	Bendigo	18.12 (120)	7.11 (53)	Won by 67 points	Simonds Stadium [H]	3rd	
19	Sunday, 5 August (2:00 pm)	North Ballarat	6.9 (45)	7.14 (56)	Won by 11 points	Eureka Stadium [A]	3rd	
20	Sunday, 12 August (2:00 pm)	Casey	14.11 (95)	16.13 (109)	Won by 11 points	Eureka Stadium [A]	2nd	
21	Saturday, 18 August (2:00 pm)	Coburg	11.13 (79)	9.12 (66)	Won by 13 points	Simonds Stadium [H]	2nd	
22	Sunday, 26 August (9:20 am)	Williamstown	11.7 (73)	11.11 (77)	Lost by 4 points	Simonds Stadium [H]	3rd	

Geelong's VFL finals matches
Round	Date and local time	Opponent	Scores^{[c]}			Venue	Ref
Round	Date and local time	Opponent	Home	Away	Result	Venue	Ref
2nd Qualifying Final	Sunday, 2 September (2:10 pm)	Port Melbourne	20.12 (132)	16.14 (110)	Lost by 22 points	North Port Oval [A]	
2nd Semi Final	Sunday, 9 September (2:10 pm)	Box Hill	11.10 (76)	9.8 (62)	Won by 14 points	Casey Fields	
2nd Preliminary Final	Sunday, 16 September (2:10 pm)	Werribee	15.13 (103)	16.12 (108)	Won by 5 points	North Port Oval	
Grand Final	Sunday, 23 September (2:15 pm)	Port Melbourne	11.9 (75)	14.24 (108)	Won by 33 points	Etihad Stadium	
Geelong were the 2012 VFL premiers.

== Notes ==
Key

- H Home match.
- A Away match.

Notes

- **^{a}** Jonathan Simpkin was elevated to the senior list in place of the injured Nathan Vardy on 24 May, making him eligible to play in a senior AFL match. After making his debut in round nine, he was returned to the rookie list on 31 May following the reinstatement of Daniel Menzel from the long-term injury list. He was re-elevated to the senior list on 31 July 2012 when Josh Cowan was placed on the long-term injury list, and played three more senior games for the season, including in the club's elimination final against Fremantle.
- **^{b}** Jesse Stringer was elevated to the senior list on 19 April, making him eligible to play in a senior AFL match. He subsequently played eight matches before being banned from senior football by Geelong for the remainder of the season on 20 June following an off-field indiscretion which the club described as "totally unacceptable behaviour". He was later replaced on the senior list by Nathan Vardy, who was returning from a long-term injury.
- **^{c}** Geelong's scores are indicated in **bold** font.
- **^{d}** The Adelaide-Geelong match at AAMI Stadium on 12 May was rescheduled from 1:15 pm to 12:45 pm to avoid a clash with racehorse Black Caviar's historic attempt for 21 wins from 21 starts.
- **^{e}** "Points" refers to any carry-over points accrued following the sanction. For example, 154.69 points would result in a one-match suspension, with 54.69 carry-over points (for every 100 points, a one-match suspension is given).
