= 2014 Geelong Football Club season =

Geelong Football Club
2014 season
- President: Colin Carter
- Coach: Chris Scott (4th season)
- Captains: Joel Selwood (3rd season)
- Home ground: Simonds Stadium

The 2014 Geelong Football Club season was the club's 115th season of senior competition in the Australian Football League (AFL). The club also fielded its reserves team in the Victorian Football League (VFL) for the 15th season.

== Club personnel ==
=== Playing list ===
Players are listed in alphabetical order by surname, and statistics are for AFL regular season and finals series matches during the 2014 AFL season only.

^	Denotes player who is on the club's rookie list.
#	Denotes nominated rookie where player has been elevated to club's senior list during season, and therefore eligible for senior selection.

Geelong's 2014 playing list and statistics
Player	#	AFL debut	Games	Goals	Behinds	Kicks	Handballs	Disposals	Marks	Tackles
Jimmy Bartel	3	2002	23	27	18	321	183	504	125	100
Zac Bates^	43	—N/a	0	0	0	0	0	0	0	0
Jed Bews	24	2014	7	0	0	30	30	60	17	25
Mark Blicavs#	46	2013	23	5	4	142	135	277	92	76
Nick Bourke^	42	—N/a	0	0	0	0	0	0	0	0
Mitch Brown	1	2011	5	4	3	37	19	56	17	11
George Burbury	31	2013	5	1	4	29	26	55	15	27
Josh Caddy	23	2011	16	11	9	121	146	267	52	64
Allen Christensen	28	2011	8	6	6	91	78	169	27	31
Josh Cowan	18	2011	0	0	0	0	0	0	0	0
Mitch Duncan	22	2010	24	23	10	302	245	547	151	78
Corey Enright	44	2001	22	8	4	255	207	462	114	61
Cameron Guthrie	29	2011	24	4	7	203	241	444	72	124
Joel Hamling	45	—N/a	0	0	0	0	0	0	0	0
Brad Hartman	36	2014	5	1	0	21	17	38	2	13
Tom Hawkins	26	2007	24	68	40	222	75	297	161	32
George Horlin-Smith	33	2012	21	13	12	167	174	341	56	58
Taylor Hunt	19	2010	7	3	1	58	35	93	21	32
Jarrad Jansen	35	—N/a	0	0	0	0	0	0	0	0
Steve Johnson	20	2002	18	17	14	265	199	464	92	94
James Kelly	9	2002	23	0	4	312	176	488	113	89
Shane Kersten	39	2014	9	10	7	43	13	56	26	19
Jake Kolodjashnij	8	—N/a	0	0	0	0	0	0	0	0
Darcy Lang	11	2014	1	1	1	5	2	7	2	6
Tom Lonergan	13	2005	23	1	3	136	116	252	97	42
Michael Luxford^	37	—N/a	0	0	0	0	0	0	0	0
Andrew Mackie	4	2004	22	5	5	297	131	428	137	45
Lincoln McCarthy	6	2012	4	0	5	24	16	40	5	11
Hamish McIntosh	17	2005	19	7	8	141	131	262	72	49
Daniel Menzel	10	2010	0	0	0	0	0	0	0	0
Steven Motlop	32	2010	17	17	16	228	104	332	81	27
Jordan Murdoch	21	2012	23	22	17	180	115	295	73	85
Jared Rivers	25	2003	22	0	1	157	128	285	125	47
Jordan Schroder	15	2012	0	0	0	0	0	0	0	0
Joel Selwood	14	2007	24	24	16	311	303	614	109	144
Jackson Sheringham#	38	2012	7	0	2	37	26	63	15	19
Dawson Simpson	16	2010	13	3	2	21	58	79	18	34
Billie Smedts	2	2012	6	0	0	34	23	57	15	8
Mathew Stokes	27	2006	20	7	4	270	239	509	80	55
Jesse Stringer	12	2012	4	2	0	18	21	39	7	12
Harry Taylor	7	2008	23	2	3	213	139	352	149	47
Jackson Thurlow	40	2013	6	3	1	31	18	49	15	9
James Toohey^	41	—N/a	0	0	0	0	0	0	0	0
Travis Varcoe	5	2007	23	9	6	151	203	354	69	88
Nathan Vardy	30	2011	0	0	0	0	0	0	0	0
Josh Walker	34	2012	7	11	4	31	24	55	23	14

== Season summary ==
=== Pre-season matches ===
Geelong's 2014 NAB Challenge fixture
Match	Date and local time	Opponent	Scores^{[a]}			Venue	Attendance	Ref
Match	Date and local time	Opponent	Home	Away	Result	Venue	Attendance	Ref
1	Wednesday, 12 February (7:10 pm)	Collingwood	0.16.8 (104)	1.13.15 (102)	Won by 2 points	Simonds Stadium [H]	12,140	
2	Friday, 28 February (5:40 pm)	Melbourne	3.9.3 (84)	0.14.13 (97)	Won by 13 points	TIO Traeger Park [A]	5,378	

Geelong's 2014 practice matches
Match	Date and local time	Opponent	Scores^{[a]}			Venue	Attendance	Ref
Match	Date and local time	Opponent	Home	Away	Result	Venue	Attendance	Ref
1	Friday, 7 March (7:00 pm)	North Melbourne	10.7 (67)	11.10 (76)	Lost by 9 points	Simonds Stadium [H]	4,594	

=== Regular season ===
Geelong's 2014 AFL season fixture
Round	Date and local time	Opponent	Home	Away	Result	Venue	Attendance	Ladder position
Round	Date and local time	Opponent	Scores^{[a]}			Venue	Attendance	Ladder position
1	Thursday, 20 March (7:10 pm)	Adelaide	18.11 (119)	12.9 (81)	Won by 38 points	Simonds Stadium [H]	23,622	6th
2	Sunday, 30 March (12:10 pm)	Brisbane Lions	10.8 (68)	13.15 (93)	Won by 25 points	The Gabba [A]	20,933	4th
3	Saturday, 5 April (7:40 pm)	Collingwood	11.10 (76)	12.15 (87)	Won by 11 points	MCG [A]	63,152	3rd
4	Saturday, 12 April (7:40 pm)	West Coast	16.11 (107)	4.8 (32)	Won by 75 points	Simonds Stadium [H]	25,271	2nd
5	Monday, 21 April (3:20 pm)	Hawthorn	15.16 (106)	12.15 (87)	Won by 19 points	MCG [H]	80,222	1st
6	Sunday, 27 April (4:10 pm)	Port Adelaide	16.11 (107)	9.13 (67)	Lost by 40 points	Adelaide Oval [A]	47.007	3rd
7	Sunday, 4 May (3:20 pm)	Richmond	11.15 (81)	12.4 (76)	Won by 5 points	MCG [H]	34,377	3rd
8	Bye							3rd
9	Saturday, 17 May (5:40 pm)	Fremantle	13.18 (96)	9.10 (64)	Lost by 32 points	Patersons Stadium [A]	38,565	4th
10	Friday, 23 May (7:50 pm)	North Melbourne	16.15 (111)	13.13 (91)	Won by 20 points	Simonds Stadium [H]	27,402	2nd
11	Thursday, 29 May (7:10 pm)	Sydney	22.16 (148)	5.8 (38)	Lost by 110 points	SCG [A]	37,255	6th
12	Friday, 6 June (7:50 pm)	Carlton	16.11 (107)	15.12 (102)	Won by 5 points	Etihad Stadium [H]	36,952	5th
13	Sunday, 15 June (1:10 pm)	St Kilda	20.13 (133)	5.7 (37)	Won by 96 points	Simonds Stadium [H]	25,180	4th
14	Sunday, 21 June (4:40 pm)	Gold Coast	17.16 (118)	11.12 (78)	Lost by 40 points	Metricon Stadium [A]	18,236	5th
15	Friday, 27 June (7:50 pm)	Essendon	13.11 (89)	11.14 (80)	Won by 9 points	Etihad Stadium [H]	43,732	5th
16	Sunday, 6 July (4:40 pm)	Western Bulldogs	10.9 (69)	7.14 (56)	Won by 13 points	Simonds Stadium [H]	24,766	5th
17	Saturday, 12 July (1:45 pm)	Melbourne	5.6 (36)	14.18 (102)	Won by 66 points	MCG [A]	36,385	4th
18	Saturday, 19 July (7:40 pm)	Greater Western Sydney	12.15 (87)	13.16 (94)	Won by 7 points	Spotless Stadium [A]	7,697	3rd
19	Saturday, 2 August (7:40 pm)	North Melbourne	10.19 (79)	16.15 (111)	Won by 32 points	Etihad Stadium [A]	32,564	3rd
20	Saturday, 9 August (7:40 pm)	Fremantle	12.9 (81)	11.13 (79)	Won by 2 points	Simonds Stadium [H]	26,885	3rd
21	Friday, 15 August (7:50 pm)	Carlton	11.10 (76)	11.16 (82)	Won by 6 points	Etihad Stadium [A]	38,812	2nd
22	Saturday, 23 August (7:40 pm)	Hawthorn	14.10 (94)	11.5 (71)	Lost by 23 points	MCG [A]	72,212	3rd
23	Saturday, 30 August (7:40 pm)	Brisbane Lions	21.17 (143)	12.9 (81)	Won by 62 points	Simonds Stadium [H]	24,659	3rd

==== Ladder ====
2014 AFL ladder
Pos	Team	Pld	W	L	D	PF	PA	PP	Pts	
1	Sydney	22	17	5	0	2126	1488	142.9	68	Finals series
2	Hawthorn (P)	22	17	5	0	2458	1746	140.8	68	Finals series
3	Geelong	22	17	5	0	2033	1787	113.8	68	Finals series
4	Fremantle	22	16	6	0	2029	1556	130.4	64	Finals series
5	Port Adelaide	22	14	8	0	2180	1678	129.9	56	Finals series
6	North Melbourne	22	14	8	0	2026	1731	117.0	56	Finals series
7	Essendon	22	12	9	1	1828	1719	106.3	50	Finals series
8	Richmond	22	12	10	0	1887	1784	105.8	48	Finals series
9	West Coast	22	11	11	0	2045	1750	116.9	44	
10	Adelaide	22	11	11	0	2175	1907	114.1	44	
11	Collingwood	22	11	11	0	1766	1876	94.1	44	
12	Gold Coast	22	10	12	0	1917	2045	93.7	40	
13	Carlton	22	7	14	1	1891	2107	89.7	30	
14	Western Bulldogs	22	7	15	0	1784	2177	81.9	28	
15	Brisbane Lions	22	7	15	0	1532	2212	69.3	28	
16	Greater Western Sydney	22	6	16	0	1780	2320	76.7	24	
17	Melbourne	22	4	18	0	1336	1954	68.4	16	
18	St Kilda	22	4	18	0	1480	2436	60.8	16	

Source: AFL Tables
Rules for classification: 1) points; 2) percentage; 3) number of points for.
(P) Premiers

=== Finals series ===
Geelong's 2014 AFL finals series matches
Round	Date and local time	Opponent	Scores^{[a]}			Venue	Attendance
Round	Date and local time	Opponent	Home	Away	Result	Venue	Attendance
QF	Friday, 5 September (7:50 pm)	Hawthorn	15.14 (104)	10.8 (68)	Lost by 36 points	MCG [A]	74,753
SF	Friday, 12 September (7:50 pm)	North Melbourne	13.14 (92)	14.14 (98)	Lost by 6 points	MCG [A]	65,963
As a result of Geelong's loss in their semi-final, the club was eliminated from the 2014 AFL finals series

== VFL season ==
=== Results ===
Geelong's 2014 VFL practice matches
Match	Date and local time	Opponent	Scores^{[a]}			Venue	Ref
Match	Date and local time	Opponent	Home	Away	Result	Venue	Ref
1	Friday, 7 March (3:40 pm)	North Ballarat	11.19 (85)	5.7 (37)	Won by 48 points	Simonds Stadium [H]	

== Notes ==
Key

- H Home match.
- A Away match.

Notes

- **^{a}** Geelong's scores are indicated in **bold** font.
