= List of Geelong Football Club reserves team seasons =

This is a list of seasons competed by the Geelong Football Club reserves team in the Victorian Football League. Geelong's reserves team has competed in the VFL (Note: The current Victorian Football League (VFL) was renamed from the former Victorian Football Association (VFA) in 1996. It is a separate competition from the Australian Football League (AFL), which was known as the Victorian Football League from 1897 to 1989.) since 2000, winning the league's premiership three times.

Table key
| ‡ | Club finished regular season in first position (minor premiers) |
| † | Club finished regular season in last position (wooden spoon) |
| DNQ | Club did not qualify for finals |
| — | Field not applicable for that season |

| Season | Club | Home and away results | | | | Finals results | Coach | Captain(s) |
| Season | Club | Finish | Wins | Losses | Draws | Finals results | Coach | Captain(s) |
|---|---|---|---|---|---|---|---|---|
| 2000 | 2000 | 5th | 13 | 6 | 0 | Lost Preliminary Final | Ron Watt | Rotation |
| 2001 | 2001 | 13th | 7 | 13 | 0 | DNQ | Ron Watt | Rotation |
| 2002 | 2002 | 1st^{‡} | 17 | 3 | 0 | Premiers (1) | Ron Watt | Tim McGrath |
| 2003 | 2003 | 8th | 8 | 10 | 0 | Lost Elimination Final | Ron Watt | Tim McGrath |
| 2004 | 2004 | 9th | 7 | 11 | 0 | DNQ | Ron Watt | James Byrne |
| 2005 | 2005 | 13th^{†} | 4 | 14 | 0 | DNQ | Leigh Tudor | James Byrne |
| 2006 | 2006 | 3rd | 13 | 5 | 0 | Runners-up (1) | Leigh Tudor | James Byrne |
| 2007 | 2007 | 2nd | 14 | 4 | 0 | Premiers (2) | Leigh Tudor | James Byrne |
| 2008 | 2008 | 10th | 6 | 10 | 0 | DNQ | Leigh Tudor | James Byrne |
| 2009 | 2009 | 8th | 9 | 9 | 0 | Lost Elimination Final | Dale Amos | James Podsiadly |
| 2010 | 2010 | 12th | 5 | 13 | 0 | DNQ | Dale Amos | Matthew Firman; James Podsiadly |
| 2011 | 2011 | 9th | 6 | 12 | 0 | DNQ | Dale Amos | Matthew Firman; Troy Selwood |
| 2012 | 2012 | 3rd | 13 | 5 | 0 | Premiers (3) | Matthew Knights | Troy Selwood |
| 2013 | 2013 | 1st^{‡} | 16 | 2 | 0 | Runners-up (2) | Matthew Knights | Troy Selwood |
| 2014 | 2014 | 9th | 9 | 9 | 0 | DNQ | Matthew Knights | Dominic Gleeson |
| 2015 | 2015 | 11th | 7 | 11 | 0 | DNQ | Paul Hood | Jack Hollmer; Ben Raidme; Jackson Sheringham; Ryan Williams |
| 2016 | 2016 | 5th | 11 | 7 | 0 | Lost Elimination Final | Shane O'Bree | Rotation |
| 2017 | 2017 | 10th | 8 | 10 | 0 | DNQ | Shane O'Bree | Tom Atkins; Jake Edwards; Ben Moloney |
| 2018 | 2018 | 3rd | 13 | 5 | 0 | Lost Semi Final | Shane O'Bree | Tom Atkins |
| 2019 | 2019 | 6th | 11 | 7 | 0 | Lost Elimination Final | Shane O'Bree | Aaron Black; James Tsitas |
| 2020 | Season cancelled due to ongoing COVID-19 pandemic in Australia. | | | | | | Shane O'Bree | Aaron Black |
| 2021 | 2021 | 4th | 7 | 2 | 0 | Finals series not contested | Shane O'Bree | Aaron Black |
| 2022 | 2022 | 14th | 8 | 10 | 0 | DNQ | Shane O'Bree | Matt Ling; Jackson McLachlan |
| 2023 | 2023 | 13th | 8 | 9 | 1 | DNQ | Mark Corrigan | Angus Byrne |
| 2024 | 2024 | 4th | 12 | 5 | 1 | Lost Semi-final | Mark Corrigan | Dan Capiron |
| 2025 | 2025 | 12th | 9 | 9 | 0 | DNQ | Mark Corrigan | Dan Capiron |
| 2026 | 2026 | 1st^{‡} | 16 | 2 | 0 | Runners-up (3) | Mark Corrigan | Dan Capiron |
