= 2009 Geelong Football Club season =

Geelong Football Club
2009 season
- President: Frank Costa
- Coach: Mark Thompson (10th season)
- Captains: Tom Harley (3rd season)
- Home ground: Skilled Stadium
- Pre-season competition: Premiers
- AFL season: 2nd
- Finals series: Premiers
- Best and Fairest: Gary Ablett, Jr. and Corey Enright
- Leading goalkicker: Cameron Mooney
- Highest home attendance: 64,803 vs. Hawthorn (25 July 2009)
- Lowest home attendance: 15,580 vs. Brisbane Lions (26 April 2009)
- Average home attendance: 30,084

The 2009 Geelong Football Club season was the club's 110th season in the Australian Football League (AFL). Geelong won the 2009 NAB Cup, their third night series/pre-season premiership, defeating Collingwood by 76 points, and finished the regular season in second position on the ladder, resulting in qualification for the 2009 AFL finals series. Geelong's regular season record (18 wins, four losses) was the first time a team had won 18 or more matches in the VFL/AFL's regular season for three consecutive seasons (2007, 2008, 2009). Geelong then proceeded to win its qualifying and preliminary finals in succession to earn a place in the 2009 AFL Grand Final against the minor premiers St Kilda. Geelong won the 2009 Grand Final over St Kilda by 80 points to 68.

== Club list ==
=== Changes from 2008 list ===
==== Additions ====
- Exchange period – received:
  - None
- Rookie elevation:
  - None
- Father/son selection:
  - None
- NAB AFL Draft (29 November 2008):
1. Mitchell Brown (Round 1; Overall pick 15; from Geelong Falcons)
2. Thomas Gillies (Round 2; Overall pick 33; from Dandenong Stringrays)
3. Steven Motlop (Round 3; Overall pick 39; from Wanderers)
4. Taylor Hunt (Round 3; Overall pick 49; from Sandringham Dragons)
- NAB AFL Pre-Season Draft (16 December 2008):
  - None
- NAB AFL Rookie Draft (16 December 2008):
1. Adam Varcoe (Round 1; Overall pick 15; from Central District)
2. Bryn Weadon (Round 2; Overall pick 31; from North Ballarat Rebels)
3. Tom Allwright (Round 3; Overall pick 46; from North Hobart Demons)
4. Ranga Ediriwickrama (Round 4; Overall pick 60; via NSW AFL scholarship program)

==== Deletions ====
- Exchange period – traded:
1. Brent Prismall – to Essendon (received Essendon's Round 3 draft selection – No.39)
- Delisted:
1. Liam Bedford (from Rookie list)
2. Jason Davenport
3. Chris Kangars (from Rookie list)
- Retirements:
1. Nathan Ablett

=== Rookie list ===
Players are listed in alphabetical order by surname, and statistics are for AFL regular season and finals series matches during the 2009 AFL season only. Statistics are correct to the end of the 2009 season (26 September 2009).

Name	No.	Debut	Games (2009)	Games (career)	Goals (2009)	Goals (career)
Tom Allwright	48	—	—	—	—	—
Ranga Ediriwickrama	42	—	—	—	—	—
Jeremy Laidler*	37	2009	1	1	0	0
Brodie Moles	36	—	—	—	—	—
Shane Mumford*	41	2008	18	21	3	3
Adam Varcoe	46	—	—	—	—	—
Bryn Weadon	47	—	—	—	—	—

- * Nominated rookie (Elevated to senior list during season, eligible for senior selection)

== Season summary ==
=== NAB Cup ===
**Round**	**Date and local time**	**Opponent**	**Scores** (Geelong's scores indicated in **bold**)			**Venue**	**Attendance**
**Round**	**Date and local time**	**Opponent**	Home	Away	Result	**Venue**	**Attendance**
1	Saturday, 21 February (7:10 pm)	Adelaide	**1.17.8 (119)**	2.9.12 (84)	Won by 35 points	Telstra Dome **[H]**	10,320
QF	Saturday, 28 February (3:10 pm)	Port Adelaide	1.6.9 (54)	**0.11.6 (72)**	Won by 18 points	AAMI Stadium **[A]**	8,341
SF	Saturday, 7 March (7:10 pm)	Carlton	**2.9.12 (84)**	0.9.13 (67)	Won by 17 points	Etihad Stadium **[H]**	15,305
GF	Friday, 13 March (7:40 pm)	Collingwood	1.6.6 (51)	**0.18.19 (127)**	Won by 76 points	Etihad Stadium **[A]**	37,277
Geelong were the 2009 NAB Cup premiers.

=== Regular season ===
**Round**	**Date and local time**	**Opponent**	**Scores** (Geelong's scores indicated in **bold**)			**Venue**	**Attendance**	**Ladder** **position**
**Round**	**Date and local time**	**Opponent**	Home	Away	Result	**Venue**	**Attendance**	**Ladder** **position**
1	Friday, 27 March (7:40 pm)	Hawthorn	16.7 (103)	**15.21 (111)**	Won by 8 points	MCG **[A]**	69,593	7
2	Saturday, 4 April (2:10 pm)	Richmond	**15.15 (105)**	13.7 (85)	Won by 20 points	Skilled Stadium **[H]**	22,288	4
3	Thursday, 9 April (7:40 pm)	Collingwood	**18.14 (122)**	13.17 (95)	Won by 27 points	MCG **[H]**	58,527	3
4	Saturday, 18 April (7:40 pm)	Adelaide	13.8 (86)	**21.8 (134)**	Won by 48 points	AAMI Stadium **[A]**	40,418	2
5	Sunday, 26 April (1:10 pm)	Brisbane Lions	**18.18 (126)**	5.3 (33)	Won by 93 points	Skilled Stadium **[H]**	15,580	2
6	Sunday, 3 May (2:10 pm)	Melbourne	10.8 (68)	**15.21 (111)**	Won by 43 points	MCG **[A]**	36,932	2
7	Saturday, 9 May (2:10 pm)	Sydney	**17.14 (116)**	10.5 (65)	Won by 51 points	Skilled Stadium **[H]**	22,050	2
8	Saturday, 16 May (2:10 pm)	North Melbourne	**18.11 (119)**	7.7 (49)	Won by 70 points	Skilled Stadium **[H]**	20,873	2
9	Friday, 22 May (7:40 pm)	Western Bulldogs	**17.14 (116)**	17.12 (114)	Won by 2 points	Etihad Stadium **[H]**	44,620	2
10	Sunday, 31 May (2:10 pm)	Essendon	11.4 (70)	**20.14 (134)**	Won by 64 points	Etihad Stadium **[A]**	48,852	2
11	Sunday, 7 June (2:40 pm)	West Coast	12.5 (77)	**15.9 (99)**	Won by 22 points	Subiaco Oval **[A]**	35,355	2
12	Sunday, 21 June (2:40 pm)	Fremantle	11.9 (75)	**13.16 (94)**	Won by 19 points	Subiaco Oval **[A]**	33,213	2
13	Sunday, 28 June (1:10 pm)	Port Adelaide	**18.14 (122)**	13.10 (88)	Won by 34 points	Skilled Stadium **[H]**	21,142	2
14	Sunday, 5 July (3:10 pm)	St Kilda	14.7 (91)	**13.7 (85)**	Lost by 6 points	Etihad Stadium **[A]**	54,444	2
15	Saturday, 11 July (7:10 pm)	Brisbane Lions	16.12 (108)	**9.11 (65)**	Lost by 43 points	The Gabba **[A]**	34,274	2
16	Saturday, 18 July (2:10 pm)	Melbourne	**17.15 (117)**	11.5 (71)	Won by 46 points	Skilled Stadium **[H]**	21,160	2
17	Saturday, 25 July (2:10 pm)	Hawthorn	**15.9 (99)**	14.14 (98)	Won by 1 point	MCG **[H]**	64,803	2
18	Saturday, 1 August (2:10 pm)	Adelaide	**14.9 (93)**	13.13 (91)	Won by 2 points	Skilled Stadium **[H]**	21.686	2
19	Friday, 7 August (7:40 pm)	Carlton	14.13 (97)	**8.14 (62)**	Lost by 35 points	MCG **[A]**	55,057	2
20	Saturday, 15 August (7:10 pm)	Sydney	13.9 (87)	**13.14 (92)**	Won by 5 points	ANZ Stadium **[A]**	40,261	2
21	Friday, 21 August (7:40 pm)	Western Bulldogs	16.14 (110)	**14.12 (96)**	Lost by 14 points	Etihad Stadium **[A]**	46,818	2
22	Saturday, 29 August (1:10 pm)	Fremantle	**14.10 (94)**	8.6 (54)	Won by 40 points	Skilled Stadium **[H]**	18,196	2

=== Finals ===
**Date and local time**	**Opponent**	**Scores** (Geelong's scores indicated in **bold**)			**Venue**	**Attendance**
**Date and local time**	**Opponent**	Home	Away	Result	**Venue**	**Attendance**
**Qualifying and Elimination Finals (second qualifying final)**
Saturday, 5 September (2:30 pm)	Western Bulldogs	**14.12 (96)**	12.10 (82)	Won by 14 points	MCG **[H]**	74,007
**Preliminary Finals (second preliminary final)**
Saturday, 19 September (7:30 pm)	Collingwood	**17.18 (120)**	6.11 (47)	Won by 73 points	MCG **[H]**	87,258
**Grand Final**
Saturday, 26 September (2:30 pm)	St Kilda	9.14 (68)	**12.8 (80)**	Won by 12 points	MCG **[A]**	99,251
Geelong were the 2009 AFL premiers.

**Geelong's 2009 teams (Finals)**
**Qualifying Final**				**Preliminary Final**			**Grand Final**
B:	Enright	Scarlett	Harley	Enright	Scarlett	Harley	Enright	Scarlett	Harley
HB:	Mackie	Taylor	Milburn	Mackie	Taylor	Milburn	Mackie	Taylor	Milburn
C:	Selwood	Bartel	Corey	Selwood	Bartel	Corey	Selwood	Bartel	Corey
HF:	Kelly	Mooney	Chapman	Kelly	Mooney	Chapman	Kelly	Mooney	Chapman
F:	Byrnes	Hawkins	Varcoe	S. Johnson	Hawkins	Varcoe	S. Johnson	Hawkins	Varcoe
Foll:	Ottens	Ling	Ablett	Ottens	Ling	Ablett	Ottens	Ling	Ablett
Int:	Blake	Hogan	Stokes	Blake	Rooke	Byrnes	Blake	Rooke	Byrnes
Int:	Wojcinski			Wojcinski			Wojcinski
Coach:	Mark Thompson			Mark Thompson			Mark Thompson
▲ In:	Chapman, Varcoe			S. Johnson, Rooke			No change
▼ Out:	Gamble, Rooke			Hogan, Stokes			No change

== Ladder ==
2009 AFL ladder
Pos	Team	Pld	W	L	D	PF	PA	PP	Pts	
1	St Kilda	22	20	2	0	2197	1411	155.7	80	Finals series
2	Geelong (P)	22	18	4	0	2312	1815	127.4	72	Finals series
3	Western Bulldogs	22	15	7	0	2378	1940	122.6	60	Finals series
4	Collingwood	22	15	7	0	2174	1778	122.3	60	Finals series
5	Adelaide	22	14	8	0	2104	1789	117.6	56	Finals series
6	Brisbane Lions	22	13	8	1	2017	1890	106.7	54	Finals series
7	Carlton	22	13	9	0	2270	2055	110.5	52	Finals series
8	Essendon	22	10	11	1	2080	2127	97.8	42	Finals series
9	Hawthorn	22	9	13	0	1962	2120	92.5	36	
10	Port Adelaide	22	9	13	0	1990	2244	88.7	36	
11	West Coast	22	8	14	0	1893	2029	93.3	32	
12	Sydney	22	8	14	0	1888	2027	93.1	32	
13	North Melbourne	22	7	14	1	1680	2015	83.4	30	
14	Fremantle	22	6	16	0	1747	2259	77.3	24	
15	Richmond	22	5	16	1	1774	2388	74.3	22	
16	Melbourne	22	4	18	0	1706	2285	74.7	16	

Source: AFL ladder
Rules for classification: 1) points; 2) percentage; 3) number of points for.
(P) Premiers

== Awards and records ==
Milestones

Player	Milestone	Round
Joel Selwood	50 games	Round 5
Travis Varcoe	50 games	Round 17
Darren Milburn	250 games	Round 18
Jimmy Bartel	150 games	Round 18
Andrew Mackie	100 games	Round 19
Cameron Ling	200 games	Round 21
David Wojcinski	150 games	Round 22

AFL awards

Award	Recipient	Awarded by
2009 Brownlow Medal	Gary Ablett, Jr.	AFL
Leigh Matthews Trophy (AFLPA Most Valuable Player)	Gary Ablett, Jr.	AFL Players Association (AFLPA)
Member of the 2009 All-Australian team (back pocket)	Corey Enright	AFL
Member of the 2009 All-Australian team (fullback)	Matthew Scarlett	AFL
Member of the 2009 All-Australian team (wing)	Joel Selwood	AFL
Member of the 2009 All-Australian team (Half-forward flank)	Paul Chapman	AFL
Member of the 2009 All-Australian team (rover)	Gary Ablett, Jr.	AFL
Robert Rose Award for Most Courageous Player	Joel Selwood	AFL Players' Association (AFLPA)
Michael Tuck Medal	Joel Selwood	AFL
2009 AFL Army Award	Tom Hawkins	AFL
Norm Smith Medal	Paul Chapman	AFL

Club awards

Award	Recipient(s)
Carji Greeves Medal	Gary Ablett, Jr. and Corey Enright
Coach's award	Corey Enright
"Best first-year player"	Tom Gillies
"Best clubman"	Brad Ottens
Leading goalkicker	Cameron Mooney
"Community champion"	Mathew Stokes
VFL best-and-fairest	James Podsiadly
Life membership	Gary Ablett, Jr., Jimmy Bartel, Mark Thompson and David Wojcinski

Other honours

Honour	Recipient	Awarded by
"Most under-rated player"	Corey Enright	AFLPA / Herald Sun player survey

Records

- First, and only, time a club has won 18 or more matches in three consecutive VFL/AFL seasons (2007, 2008, 2009).
- Most times a player has been awarded the Leigh Matthews Trophy as the AFLPA's Most Valuable Player – Gary Ablett, Jr. (three times; 2007, 2008, 2009).
- Highest number of disposals in a single VFL/AFL match – Gary Ablett, Jr. in round four against Adelaide (46 disposals; tied with Nathan Buckley). (Note: Ablett and Buckley's record is the official record for the highest number of disposals in a single VFL/AFL match since Champion Data started recording statistics in 1999, and also since quarters were shortened to 20 minutes in 1994. The record has since been broken by Dane Swan (Collingwood), who garnered 48 disposals in Round 10, 2009.)
- Highest number of handpasses in a single VFL/AFL match – Gary Ablett, Jr. in round four against Adelaide (33 handpasses). (Note: The previous record for most handpasses was held by Matt Priddis (West Coast) and was set during the 2008 AFL season.)

== Notes ==
Key

- H Home match.
- A Away match.

General notes
