= Orren Stephenson =

Australian rules footballer (born 1982)

Personal information
- Born: 15 July 1982 (age 44); Wagga Wagga, New South Wales, Australia
- Original team: Mangoplah Cookardinia United Eastlakes (NSW) / Redan (Ballarat Football League)
- Draft: No. 78, 2011 National Draft, Geelong
- Height: 200 cm (6 ft 7 in)
- Weight: 104 kg (229 lb)
- Position: Ruckman

Playing career^{1}
Years	Club	Games (Goals)
2012	Geelong	8 (1)
2013–2014	Richmond	7 (0)
Total		15 (1)
- ^{1} Playing statistics correct to the end of 2014.

Orren Stephenson (born 15 July 1982) is an Australian rules footballer who played for the Geelong Football Club and the Richmond Football Club in the Australian Football League (AFL).

He was originally drafted by the Geelong Football Club in the 2011 AFL draft at the age of 29, the oldest first-time draftee in AFL draft history.

== Early life ==
Stephenson grew up in the southern New South Wales towns of Albury, Wagga Wagga and Griffith. He mainly played rugby league as a junior, before he met his wife Whitney. It was at the Mangoplah Cookardinia United Eastlakes football club where Stephenson first got his taste of senior Australian rules football. In 2002 Stephenson moved his young family to Ballarat in central Victoria where his wife Whitney's family lives. He started playing football for the Redan Football Club and after 2 premiership wins in 2002 and 2003 and then winning their best and fairest award in 2004, Stephenson joined the North Ballarat Football Club in 2005.

== VFL career ==
Stephenson has been a member of four VFL premiership teams: three with North Ballarat in 2008, 2009 and 2010, and one with Geelong in 2012; he won the Norm Goss Medal as the best player on the ground in the 2009 Grand Final. He was named in four VFL teams of the year and represented the VFL twice in interstate matches.

== AFL career ==
Stephenson was selected by Geelong in the 2011 AFL national draft, to replace the retiring Brad Ottens. He played his first AFL game against Fremantle in round one of 2012 due to injuries to Nathan Vardy and Dawson Simpson. Stephenson was subsequently delisted by Geelong following the 2012 AFL Season. Stephenson was then drafted to the Richmond Tigers with pick no. 36 in the 2013 Rookie Draft. On 11 March 2014, Stephenson was elevated to the club's senior list.

Stephenson was delisted at the conclusion of the 2014 AFL season.

== Personal life ==
Stephenson is married to Whitney Head with whom he shares two daughters and a son. He is qualified as both an electrician and a telecommunications technician.
