= Jonathan Simpkin =

Australian rules footballer (born 1987)

- Simpkin in September 2026

Personal information
- Full name: Jonathan Simpkin
- Born: 28 October 1987 (age 39)
- Original team: Geelong Falcons
- Draft: No. 16, 2006 rookie draft
- Debut: Round 9, 2012, Geelong vs. Western Bulldogs, at Etihad Stadium
- Height: 181 cm (5 ft 11 in)
- Weight: 82 kg (181 lb)
- Position: Midfielder

Playing career^{1}
Years	Club	Games (Goals)
2006–2007	Sydney	0 (0)
2011–2012	Geelong	4 (1)
2013–2015	Hawthorn	33 (15)
2016	Essendon	4 (1)
Total		41 (17)
- ^{1} Playing statistics correct to the end of 2016.

Career highlights
- AFL premiership player: 2013; 2× AFL Canberra premiership player: 2006, 2007; 2× VFL premiership player: 2012, 2013; Norm Goss Memorial Medal: 2013; 2× Geelong (VFL) best and fairest: 2011, 2012; Col Austen Trophy: 2015

Jonathan Simpkin (born 28 October 1987) is a former professional Australian rules footballer who played for the Geelong Football Club, Hawthorn Football Club and Essendon Football Club in the Australian Football League (AFL). Nicknamed "Joffa", his younger brother, Tom Simpkin was also a professional Australian rules footballer who played for St Kilda.

== AFL career ==
=== Sydney ===
Originally from Colac, Victoria, Simpkin was first rookie listed by the Sydney Swans with the 16th selection in the 2006 AFL Rookie Draft after playing junior football for the Geelong Falcons in the TAC Cup. Simpkin spend the 2006 and 2007 season playing for the Sydney Swans reserves team that won the 2006 and 2007 AFL Canberra premierships. Despite being elevated to their senior list for the 2007 season, he was delisted by the Swans at the end of the 2007 season without having played in the AFL. He trained for a period late in 2007 with Melbourne but was not drafted to their squad.

=== Geelong ===
He returned to play for the Colac Tigers in the Geelong Football League. During 2008 he also managed to play 8 games for Geelong in the Victorian Football League (VFL) on permits. In 2009, he was a full-time member of the Geelong (VFL) squad and in 2010 he represented the VFL against WAFL. In December 2010 in the 2011 Rookie Draft he was then selected by Geelong. He continued to play for Geelong in the VFL and despite performing well consistently throughout the season, winning the team's best and fairest award, he was unable to break into the AFL side.

Prior to round 9 of the 2012 AFL season, Simpkin was promoted off the rookie list as a replacement for Nathan Vardy. He then made his debut against Western Bulldogs, coming on as the substitute player at three-quarter time. Simpkin again won the Geelong (VFL) best and fairest award in 2012 and also was part of the winning Geelong (VFL) premiership side the same year. Geelong had to reduce the number of rookies from six to four because of new AFL rules, so they decided not to renew his contract and that he became eligible to be on the AFL Delisted Free Agency list.

=== Hawthorn ===
Hawthorn secured former Geelong rookie Jonathan Simpkin during the 2012 AFL Delisted Free Agency Period.

He played his first game for Hawthorn against Adelaide in Adelaide, South Australia, in round six 2013 and finished the season with 13 games. Owing to injury to Brendan Whitecross he was selected for Hawthorn's grand final team and was subbed on at three quarter time winning a premiership medal when the Hawks defeated Fremantle, in his first season at the club. He also played in Box Hill's VFL premiership team winning the Norm Goss Memorial Medal for his best on ground performance that day.

Simpkin played only one AFL game for Hawthorn in 2015 (a round 7 win over Melbourne) and he was delisted in October.

=== Essendon ===
In January 2016, Simpkin signed with the Essendon Football Club as a "top-up" player due to the supplements controversy.

== Statistics ==
Legend
G	Goals	K	Kicks	D	Disposals	T	Tackles
B	Behinds	H	Handballs	M	Marks

Season	Team	No.	Games	Totals							Averages (per game)							Votes
Season	Team	No.	Games	G	B	K	H	D	M	T	G	B	K	H	D	M	T	Votes
2006	Sydney	29	0	—	—	—	—	—	—	—	—	—	—	—	—	—	—	0
2007	Sydney	29	0	—	—	—	—	—	—	—	—	—	—	—	—	—	—	0
2011	Geelong	46	0	—	—	—	—	—	—	—	—	—	—	—	—	—	—	0
2012	Geelong	46	4	1	0	22	13	35	8	7	0.3	0.0	5.5	3.3	8.8	2.0	1.8	0
2013^{#}	Hawthorn	32	14	6	5	123	104	227	49	31	0.4	0.4	8.8	7.4	16.2	3.5	2.2	0
2014	Hawthorn	32	18	9	5	152	139	291	66	39	0.5	0.3	8.4	7.7	16.2	3.7	2.2	1
2015	Hawthorn	32	1	0	0	3	4	7	2	2	0.0	0.0	3.0	4.0	7.0	2.0	2.0	0
2016	Essendon	52	4	1	0	33	41	74	13	6	0.3	0.0	8.3	10.3	18.5	3.3	1.5	0
Career			41	17	10	333	301	634	138	85	0.4	0.2	8.1	7.3	15.5	3.4	2.1	1

== Honours and achievements ==
Team

- AFL premiership player (Hawthorn): 2013
- Minor premiership (Hawthorn): 2013
- VFL premiership player (Geelong VFL): 2012
- VFL premiership player (Box Hill): 2013
- Minor premiership (Box Hill): 2015

Individual

- Norm Goss Memorial Medal: 2013
- 2× Geelong (VFL) best and fairest: 2011, 2012
- Col Austen Trophy: 2015
