= Tom Simpkin =

Australian rules footballer (born 1990)

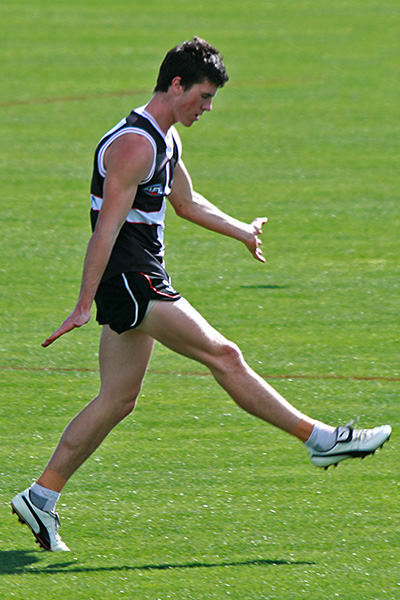

Personal information
- Full name: Tom Simpkin
- Nickname: Headsworth
- Born: 7 August 1990 (age 36)
- Original team: Geelong Falcons (TAC Cup)
- Draft: No. 29, 2009 Rookie Draft, St Kilda; No. 111 (RP), 2010 National Draft, St Kilda
- Height: 191 cm (6 ft 3 in)
- Weight: 91 kg (201 lb)
- Position: Defender

Playing career^{1}
| Years | Club | Games (Goals) |
| 2011–2015 | St Kilda | 31 (2) |
- ^{1} Playing statistics correct to the end of 2015.

Tom Simpkin (born 7 August 1990) is a former professional Australian rules footballer who played for the St Kilda Football Club in the Australian Football League (AFL).

== Playing career ==
Simpkin was recruited with the 29th pick in the 2009 rookie draft from the Geelong Falcons, and was promoted to St Kilda's senior list in August 2010. He made his AFL debut in Round 11 of the 2011 AFL season against Collingwood. He was delisted at the conclusion of the 2015 season.

== Personal life ==
His brother Jonathan is a premiership player with Hawthorn in 2013 & Box Hill in 2013.
