= Trent West =

Australian rules footballer

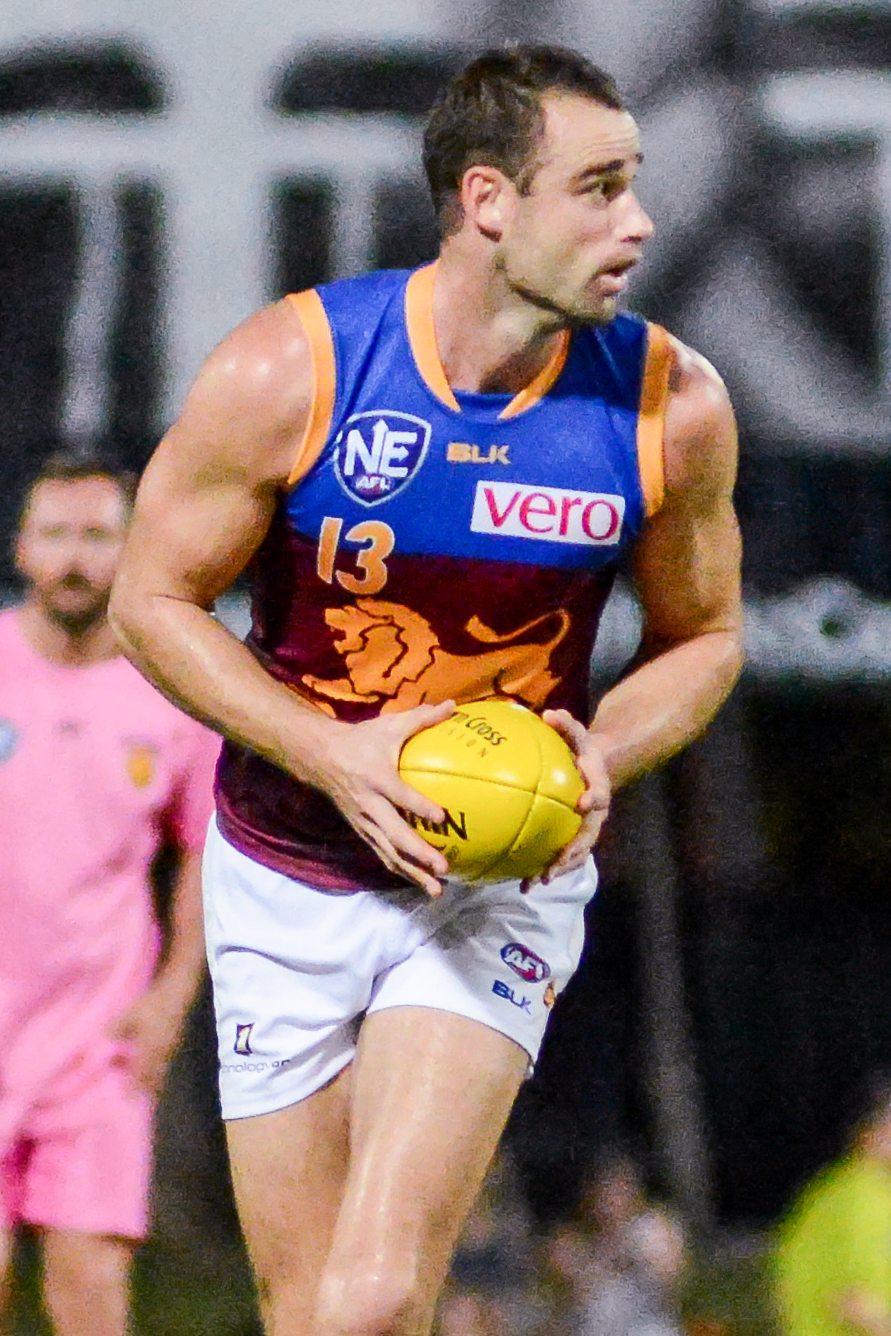
- West playing for Brisbane Lions reserves in June 2016

Personal information
- Full name: Trent West
- Born: 17 October 1987 (age 39)
- Original teams: Wonthaggi (Gippsland FL); Gippsland Power (TAC Cup)
- Draft: No. 31, 2005 national draft
- Height: 198 cm (6 ft 6 in)
- Weight: 102 kg (225 lb)
- Position: Ruckman

Playing career^{1}
Years	Club	Games (Goals)
2008–2013	Geelong	54 (23)
2014–2016	Brisbane Lions	16 (5)
Total		70 (28)
- ^{1} Playing statistics correct to the end of 2016.

Career highlights
- AFL premiership player (Geelong): 2011; McClelland Trophy (Geelong): 2008; VFL premiership (Geelong): 2007; TAC Cup premiership (Gippsland): 2005

Trent West (born 17 October 1987) is a former professional Australian rules footballer who played for the Geelong Football Club and Brisbane Lions in the Australian Football League (AFL).

== Career ==
West was recruited by the Geelong Football Club with their second selection and thirty-first overall in the 2005 national draft. He spent his first two-season playing for Geelong's reserves in the Victorian Football League (VFL). He made his AFL debut in the nine-point win against the Port Adelaide Football Club in round one, 2008 at AAMI Stadium.

In October 2011, West was part of the Geelong premiership side which defeated the Collingwood Football Club by 38-points.

In the 2013 trade period, West was traded to the Brisbane Lions.

In August 2016, he announced he would retire from the AFL at the end of the season.

== Statistics ==
Legend
G	Goals	K	Kicks	D	Disposals	T	Tackles
B	Behinds	H	Handballs	M	Marks	H/O	Hit-outs

Season	Team	No.	Games	Totals								Averages (per game)							
Season	Team	No.	Games	G	B	K	H	D	M	T	H/O	G	B	K	H	D	M	T	H/O
2006	Geelong	12	0	—	—	—	—	—	—	—	—	—	—	—	—	—	—	—	—
2007	Geelong	12	0	—	—	—	—	—	—	—	—	—	—	—	—	—	—	—	—
2008	Geelong	12	6	1	0	6	29	35	13	10	37	0.2	0.0	1.0	4.8	5.8	2.2	1.7	6.2
2009	Geelong	12	1	0	0	0	0	0	0	0	16	0.0	0.0	0.0	0.0	0.0	0.0	0.0	16.0
2010	Geelong	12	4	2	3	9	23	32	11	8	49	0.5	0.8	2.3	5.8	8.0	2.8	2.0	12.3
2011	Geelong	12	9	7	2	51	32	83	25	36	183	0.8	0.2	5.7	3.6	9.2	2.8	4.0	20.3
2012	Geelong	12	21	8	7	103	112	215	59	52	518	0.4	0.3	4.9	5.3	10.2	2.8	2.5	24.7
2013	Geelong	12	13	5	3	76	51	127	23	12	278	0.4	0.2	5.8	3.9	9.8	1.8	0.9	21.4
2014	Brisbane Lions	13	10	4	0	56	49	105	30	22	240	0.4	0.0	5.6	4.9	10.5	3.0	2.2	24.0
2015	Brisbane Lions	13	2	1	0	6	0	6	4	2	12	0.5	0.0	3.0	0.0	3.0	2.0	1.0	6.0
2016	Brisbane Lions	13	4	0	1	14	22	36	9	8	82	0.0	0.3	3.5	5.5	9.0	2.3	2.0	20.5
Career			70	28	16	321	318	639	174	150	1415	0.4	0.2	4.6	4.5	9.1	2.5	2.1	20.2

== Honours and achievements ==
- Team
  - AFL premiership (Geelong): 2011
  - AFL McClelland Trophy (Geelong): 2008
  - VFL premiership (Geelong): 2007
  - TAC Cup premiership (Gippsland): 2005
- Individual
  - Vic Country team representative honours in AFL Under 18 Championships: 2005
