= Josh Walker (Australian footballer) =

Australian rules footballer (born 1992)

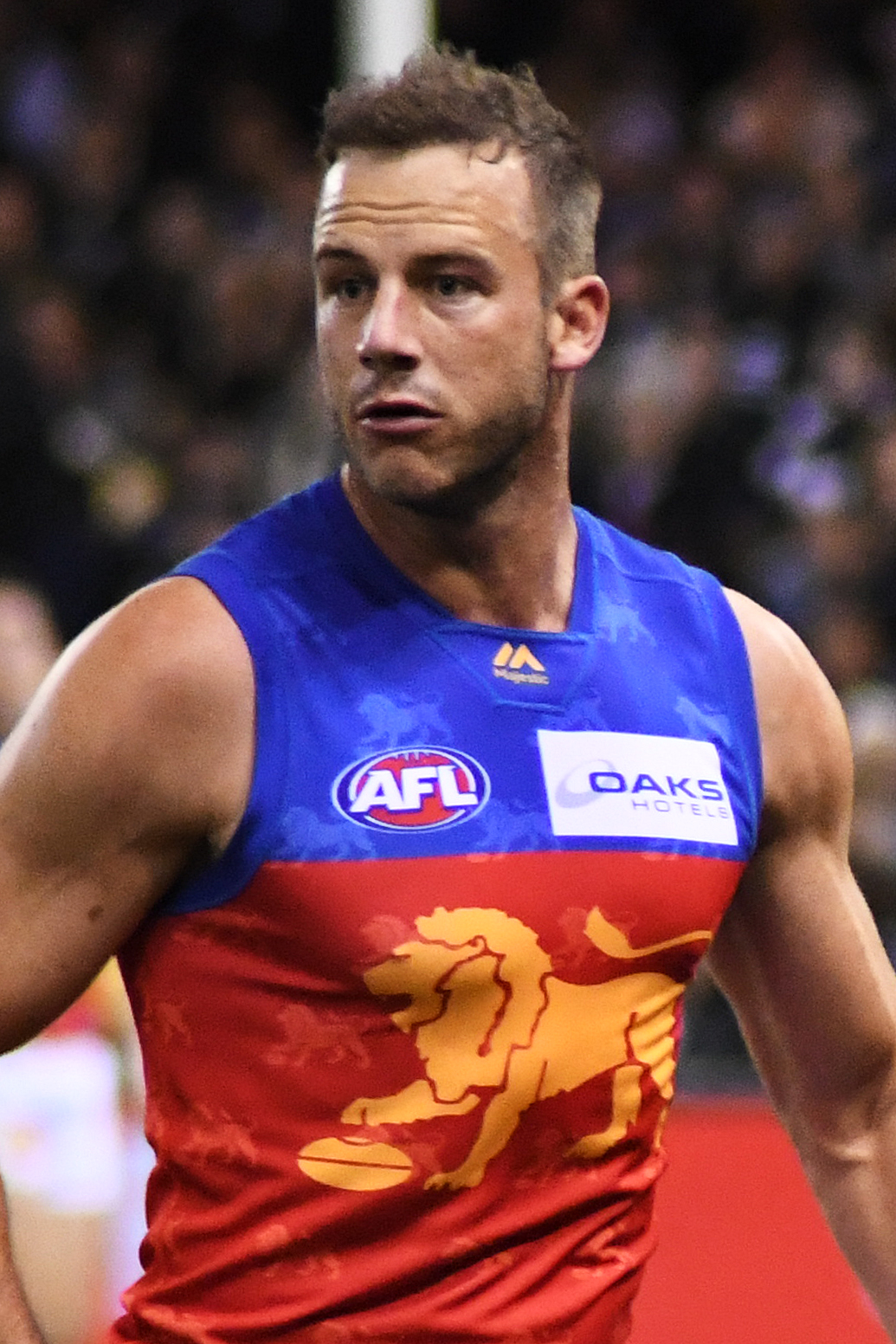
- Walker in August 2018

Personal information
- Full name: Josh Walker
- Nicknames: Walks, Plugs
- Born: 12 November 1992 (age 33)
- Original teams: Lara (GFL); Geelong Falcons (TAC Cup)
- Draft: No. 23, 2011 Rookie Draft, Geelong
- Height: 197 cm (6 ft 6 in)
- Weight: 98 kg (216 lb)
- Position: Key Defender

Playing career^{1}
Years	Club	Games (Goals)
2012–2015	Geelong	33 (35)
2016–2019	Brisbane Lions	52 (34)
2020–2022	North Melbourne	54 (6)
Total		139 (75)
- ^{1} Playing statistics correct to the end of Round 23 2022.

Career highlights
- Brisbane leading goalkicker: 2016

Josh Walker (born 12 November 1992) is a former professional Australian rules footballer who has played for the Geelong Football Club, Brisbane Lions and the North Melbourne Football Club in the Australian Football League (AFL).

== AFL career ==
Walker was recruited by Geelong in the 2011 rookie draft with pick 23. He made his debut in round 16, 2012, against Collingwood at the MCG. He is the grandson of Geelong premiership player Peter Walker. A strong-marking ruck/forward who found his place in the team limited behind Tom Hawkins and James Podsiadly. Once Podsiadly left for Adelaide he was selected as the second tall forward, he managed 33 games and 35 goals in four seasons.

He was traded to Brisbane in the 2015 trade period. After four years at the Lions, he was delisted at the conclusion of the 2019 AFL season at which time he accepted an offer to play for North Melbourne. In 2020, Walker signed a contract extension to play for North until the end of 2021. After a strong 2021 season, Walker signed another one-year extension with the Kangaroos, extending his contract until at least the end of the 2022 season. Walker mostly played as a defender for North and was a regular starting player during his time at the club where he was known as a strong intercept marker. Shortly after the 2022 season, Walker was advised by the Kangaroos that he wouldn’t be offered a contract by the club for 2023. Walker subsequently announced his retirement from the AFL in December 2022 after a career of 139 Games in the league.
