= Jesse Stringer =

Australian rules footballer

Personal information
- Full name: Jesse Stringer
- Born: 3 April 1991 (age 35)
- Original team: Port Adelaide (SANFL)
- Draft: No. 61, 2010 Rookie Draft, Geelong
- Height: 182 cm (6 ft 0 in)
- Weight: 73 kg (161 lb)

Playing career^{1}
Years	Club	Games (Goals)
2012–2014	Geelong	19 (8)
- ^{1} Playing statistics correct to the end of 2014.

Jesse Stringer (born 3 April 1991) is a former professional Australian rules football player who played for Geelong in the Australian Football League (AFL). He was recruited with pick number 61 in the 2010 Rookie Draft having played for the Port Adelaide Football Club in the SANFL. He made his debut in round 4, 2012, against Richmond.

On 20 June 2012, Stringer was banned from 2012 AFL season due to unacceptable behaviour involving a woman. Victoria Police said police arrived at a street in Grovedale, where they received a report about an alleged assault. He was arrested and released pending further inquiries.

Stringer was delisted at the conclusion of the 2014 AFL season.
