= Jordan Murdoch =

Australian rules footballer

Personal information
- Full name: Jordan Murdoch
- Born: 23 March 1992 (age 34)
- Original team: Glenelg (SANFL)
- Draft: No. 48, 2011 AFL draft, Geelong
- Height: 190 cm (6 ft 3 in)
- Weight: 87 kg (192 lb)
- Position: Utility

Playing career
Years	Club	Games (Goals)
2012–2018	Geelong	108 (73)
2019–2021	Gold Coast	14 (1)
Total		122 (74)

Jordan Murdoch (born 23 March 1992) is a former professional Australian rules football player, who played for the Gold Coast Football Club and the Geelong Football Club in the Australian Football League (AFL). He made his South Australian National Football League (SANFL) senior debut for the Glenelg Football Club in round 21 of the 2011 SANFL season, against West Adelaide. He was then drafted into the AFL by the Geelong Football Club with the 48th selection in the 2011 AFL draft. Murdoch made his AFL debut in July 2012 against Port Adelaide.

Murdoch is the son of former Norwood Football Club player Roger Murdoch. His younger brother Brodie Murdoch was recruited by St Kilda in the 2012 AFL draft.

At the conclusion of the 2018 AFL season he was delisted by Geelong. Shortly after, he signed a three-year contract with the Gold Coast Suns.

Murdoch played 14 games in the 2019 AFL season, but did not add to his tally during the 2020 AFL season, after which he was delisted and redrafted as a Category A rookie by the Gold Coast.

Murdoch retired from professional football at the conclusion of the 2021 AFL season, having not played senior football since the 2019 AFL season.
