= George Horlin-Smith =

Australian rules footballer

Personal information
- Full name: George Horlin-Smith
- Born: 22 December 1992 (age 33); Adelaide, South Australia
- Original team: Sturt (SANFL)
- Draft: No. 37, 2010 national draft
- Height: 188 cm (6 ft 2 in)
- Weight: 84 kg (185 lb)
- Position: Midfielder / Forward

Club information
- Current club: Gold Coast
- Number: 33

Playing career^{1}
Years	Club	Games (Goals)
2012–2018	Geelong	51 (27)
2019	Gold Coast	7 (2)
Total		58 (29)
- ^{1} Playing statistics correct to the end of 2019.

Career highlights
- 2013 AFL Rising Star: nominee; Norm Goss Medal: 2012; VFL premiership player: 2012

George Horlin-Smith (born 22 December 1992) is a former Australian rules footballer who played for the Gold Coast Football Club and the Geelong Football Club in the Australian Football League (AFL).

== Early life ==
Horlin-Smith went to Pembroke School in Adelaide, South Australia. Horlin-Smith was a promising cricketer, having co-captained the Australian under-16 cricket team to the West Indies in 2008, but he decided to pursue a career in football. Along with playing at Pembroke, Horlin-Smith would play his junior football at the Payneham Norwood Union Football Club and the Sturt Football Club. He has played for Geelong in the NAB Cup. He was taken by Geelong at number 37 in the 2010 AFL national draft.

== AFL career ==
After suffering a shoulder injury in the lead-up to the 2011 season, Horlin-Smith was unable to break into Geelong's strong senior team, but he did manage nine games for Geelong's VFL side.

Horlin-Smith's development continued in 2012, playing three games with Geelong's AFL side. His 2012 season in Geelong's VFL side garnered a premiership medal with the Cats, and the Norm Goss Memorial Medal for best player afield in the Grand Final. He finished the regular season as Geelong's highest vote getter in the J.J. Liston medal, coming 5th overall.

Horlin-Smith was awarded the Round 4 nomination for the 2013 AFL Rising Star.

At the conclusion of the 2018 season, Horlin-Smith was traded to Gold Coast.

== Personal life ==
Horlin-Smith obtained a Master of Business Administration from Deakin University in 2019.

== Statistics ==
Statistics are correct to end of 2018

Legend
G	Goals	K	Kicks	D	Disposals	T	Tackles
B	Behinds	H	Handballs	M	Marks

Season	Team	No.	Games	Totals							Averages (per game)						
Season	Team	No.	Games	G	B	K	H	D	M	T	G	B	K	H	D	M	T
2012	Geelong	33	3	2	1	20	17	37	12	3	0.7	0.3	6.7	5.7	12.3	4.0	1.0
2013	Geelong	33	8	3	2	51	67	118	23	18	0.4	0.3	6.4	8.4	14.8	2.9	2.3
2014	Geelong	33	21	13	12	167	174	341	56	58	0.6	0.6	8.0	8.3	16.2	2.7	2.8
2015	Geelong	33	7	2	1	29	70	99	15	21	0.3	0.1	4.1	10.0	14.1	2.1	3.0
2016	Geelong	33	1	0	0	5	4	9	1	2	0.0	0.0	5.0	4.0	9.0	1.0	2.0
2017	Geelong	33	7	4	3	65	68	133	13	30	0.6	0.4	9.3	9.7	19.0	1.9	4.3
2018	Geelong	33	4	3	0	34	31	65	7	15	0.8	0.0	8.5	7.8	16.3	1.8	3.8
Career			51	27	19	371	431	802	127	147	0.5	0.4	7.3	8.5	15.7	2.5	2.9
