= Tom Gillies =

Australian rules footballer

Personal information
- Full name: Thomas Gillies
- Born: 7 March 1990 (age 36); Traralgon, Victoria, Australia
- Original team: Dandenong Stingrays
- Draft: 33rd overall, 2008; Geelong
- Height: 192 cm (6 ft 4 in)
- Weight: 89 kg (196 lb)
- Position: Full Back

Playing career^{1}
Years	Club	Games (Goals)
2009–2012	Geelong	13 (1)
2013	Melbourne	2 (0)
Total		15 (1)
- ^{1} Playing statistics correct to the end of 2013.

Thomas Gillies (born 7 March 1990) is a former Australian rules footballer for the Geelong Football Club and the Melbourne Football Club in the Australian Football League (AFL).

== Early life ==
Tom began his career with the Traralgon-based Tedas Junior Football Club. He then went on to play with the Narre Warren Football Club which led to getting selected to play for the Dandenong Stingrays in the TAC Cup. Gillies won the Stingrays best and fairest award in 2008.

== AFL career ==
Gillies was selected by Geelong with the 33rd pick in the 2008 AFL draft.

He made his debut in round 15 of the 2009 AFL season against the Brisbane Lions and played in six of the last eight games of the year. At the end of the year he was awarded Geelong's best first year player award.

After playing 13 games in three seasons with Geelong, Gillies was delisted by the club at the end of the 2012 AFL season. He was offered a one-year contract by Melbourne and joined the Demons ahead of the 2013 season.

Gillies played just two matches for Melbourne in the middle of the 2013 AFL season under coach Mark Neeld and was delisted at the end of that season.

== Post AFL ==
In 2014 he began playing for St Mary's in the Geelong Football League (GFL). Gillies had been preparing for life after the AFL taking the Victoria Police entrance exam and joining the police academy.

After becoming one of the GFL's leading goalkickers, Gillies later joined the Bannockburn Football Club.

== Statistics ==
Legend
G	Goals	K	Kicks	D	Disposals	T	Tackles
B	Behinds	H	Handballs	M	Marks

Season	Team	No.	Games	Totals							Averages (per game)						
Season	Team	No.	Games	G	B	K	H	D	M	T	G	B	K	H	D	M	T
2009	Geelong	25	6	0	0	23	37	60	12	5	0.0	0.0	3.8	6.2	10.0	2.0	0.8
2010	Geelong	25	0	—	—	—	—	—	—	—	—	—	—	—	—	—	—
2011	Geelong	25	2	0	0	8	8	16	4	1	0.0	0.0	4.0	4.0	8.0	2.0	0.5
2012	Geelong	25	5	1	0	40	33	73	26	9	0.2	0.0	8.0	6.6	14.6	5.2	1.8
2013	Melbourne	27	2	0	0	9	7	16	5	0	0.0	0.0	4.5	3.5	8.0	2.5	0.0
Career totals			15	1	0	80	85	165	47	15	0.1	0.0	5.3	5.7	11.0	3.1	1.0
