= Shane Kersten =

Australian rules footballer

Personal information
- Born: 15 March 1993 (age 33)
- Original team: South Fremantle (WAFL)
- Draft: No. 34, 2011 national draft
- Height: 191 cm (6 ft 3 in)
- Weight: 93 kg (205 lb)
- Position: Forward/defender

Playing career^{1}
Years	Club	Games (Goals)
2014–2016	Geelong	37 (41)
2017–2019	Fremantle	29 (26)
Total		66 (67)
- ^{1} Playing statistics correct to the end of 2018.

Shane Kersten (born 15 March 1993) is a former professional Australian rules footballer who played for the Fremantle Football Club in the Australian Football League (AFL). He previously played for the Geelong Football Club from 2012 to 2016. He was recruited from the South Fremantle in the West Australian Football League (WAFL) with the thirty-fourth selection in the 2011 AFL draft.

Kersten was considered to make his AFL debut in the 2013 preliminary final, but due to a knee injury had to wait until round 14 of the 2014 AFL season to be selected. He kicked three goals in his debut game and was a standout despite Geelong losing to Gold Coast by 40 points. Kersten celebrated his first win the following week against Essendon when he kicked two goals as Geelong. After making his debut Kersten struggled at times to maintain his spot in the side but developed into a second forward target alongside Tom Hawkins, as well as an effective defensive option.

At the conclusion of the 2016 season, after not playing in Geelong's two final series games, Kersten was traded to Fremantle in return for selection 63 in the 2016 AFL draft.

In his first season at Fremantle, Kersten kicked 24 goals from 20 games, coming second in Fremantle's goal kicking leaderboard. His most noted performance came in round 5 against North Melbourne at Domain Stadium. With only 40 seconds left in the final quarter, Kersten brilliantly snapped a late running goal from the deep right pocket, giving Fremantle a 5-point lead, leading them to victory.

In 2018, he began playing as a key defender after some poor performances as a forward, and made his debut in that role in round 13 of the 2018 season against Carlton.

== Statistics ==
Statistics are correct to the end of the 2016 season

Legend
G	Goals	K	Kicks	D	Disposals	T	Tackles
B	Behinds	H	Handballs	M	Marks

Season	Team	No.	Games	Totals							Averages (per game)						
Season	Team	No.	Games	G	B	K	H	D	M	T	G	B	K	H	D	M	T
2012	Geelong	39	0	—	—	—	—	—	—	—	—	—	—	—	—	—	—
2013	Geelong	39	0	—	—	—	—	—	—	—	—	—	—	—	—	—	—
2014	Geelong	39	9	10	7	43	13	56	26	19	1.1	0.8	4.8	1.4	6.2	2.9	2.1
2015	Geelong	39	11	9	7	47	40	87	37	28	0.8	0.6	4.3	3.6	7.9	3.4	2.6
2016	Geelong	39	17	22	15	123	76	199	80	43	1.3	0.9	7.2	4.5	11.7	4.7	2.5
Career			37	41	29	213	129	342	143	90	1.1	0.8	5.8	3.5	9.2	3.9	2.4
