= Billie Smedts =

Australian rules footballer

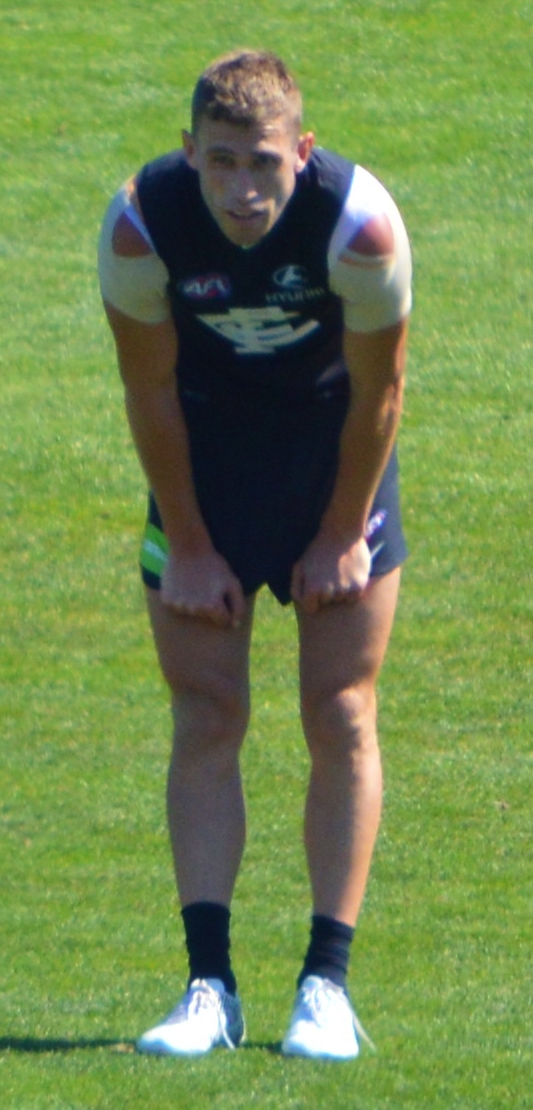
- Smedts in March 2017

Personal information
- Full name: Billie Smedts
- Born: 8 June 1992 (age 34); Warrnambool
- Original teams: North Warrnambool (HFL); Geelong Falcons (TAC Cup)
- Draft: No. 15, 2010 national draft
- Height: 189 cm (6 ft 2 in)
- Weight: 76 kg (168 lb)

Playing career^{1}
Years	Club	Games (Goals)
2012–2016	Geelong	38 (19)
2017	Carlton	9 (1)
Total		47 (20)
- ^{1} Playing statistics correct to the end of 2017.

Billie Smedts (born 8 June 1992) is a former professional Australian rules footballer who played for the Geelong Football Club and Carlton Football Club in the Australian Football League (AFL). He was recruited by Geelong with their first pick and fifteenth overall in the 2010 national draft. He hails from Warrnambool and played in the TAC Cup for the Geelong Falcons. He made his AFL debut for Geelong in the opening round of the 2012 AFL season against Fremantle at Patersons Stadium. At the conclusion of the 2016 season, he was traded to Carlton. He made his first senior appearance for the Carlton Football Club in the Round 1, 43-point loss to Richmond at the MCG.

Smedts played nine senior games in his first season with Carlton. He struggled to make a consistent impact and was delisted at the end of the year.

Smedts struggled with injury throughout his career, suffering a broken leg twice, a broken collarbone, and undergoing a shoulder reconstruction.

== Statistics ==
Statistics are correct to the end of the 2016 season

Legend
G	Goals	K	Kicks	D	Disposals	T	Tackles
B	Behinds	H	Handballs	M	Marks

Season	Team	No.	Games	Totals							Averages (per game)						
Season	Team	No.	Games	G	B	K	H	D	M	T	G	B	K	H	D	M	T
2011	Geelong	2	0	—	—	—	—	—	—	—	—	—	—	—	—	—	—
2012	Geelong	2	14	6	9	94	72	166	43	40	0.4	0.6	6.7	5.1	11.9	3.1	2.9
2013	Geelong	2	13	12	8	75	65	140	40	40	0.9	0.6	5.8	5.0	10.8	3.1	3.1
2014	Geelong	2	6	0	0	34	23	57	15	8	0.0	0.0	5.7	3.8	9.5	2.5	1.3
2015	Geelong	2	4	0	0	19	23	42	16	11	0.0	0.0	4.8	5.8	10.5	4.0	2.8
2016	Geelong	2	1	1	0	5	11	16	3	1	1.0	0.0	5.0	11.0	16.0	3.0	1.0
2017	Carlton	16	9	1	3	44	47	91	20	32	0.1	0.3	4.9	5.2	10.1	2.2	3.5
Career			47	20	20	271	241	512	137	132	0.4	0.4	6.0	5.1	10.9	2.9	2.9
