= Taylor Hunt =

Australian rules footballer

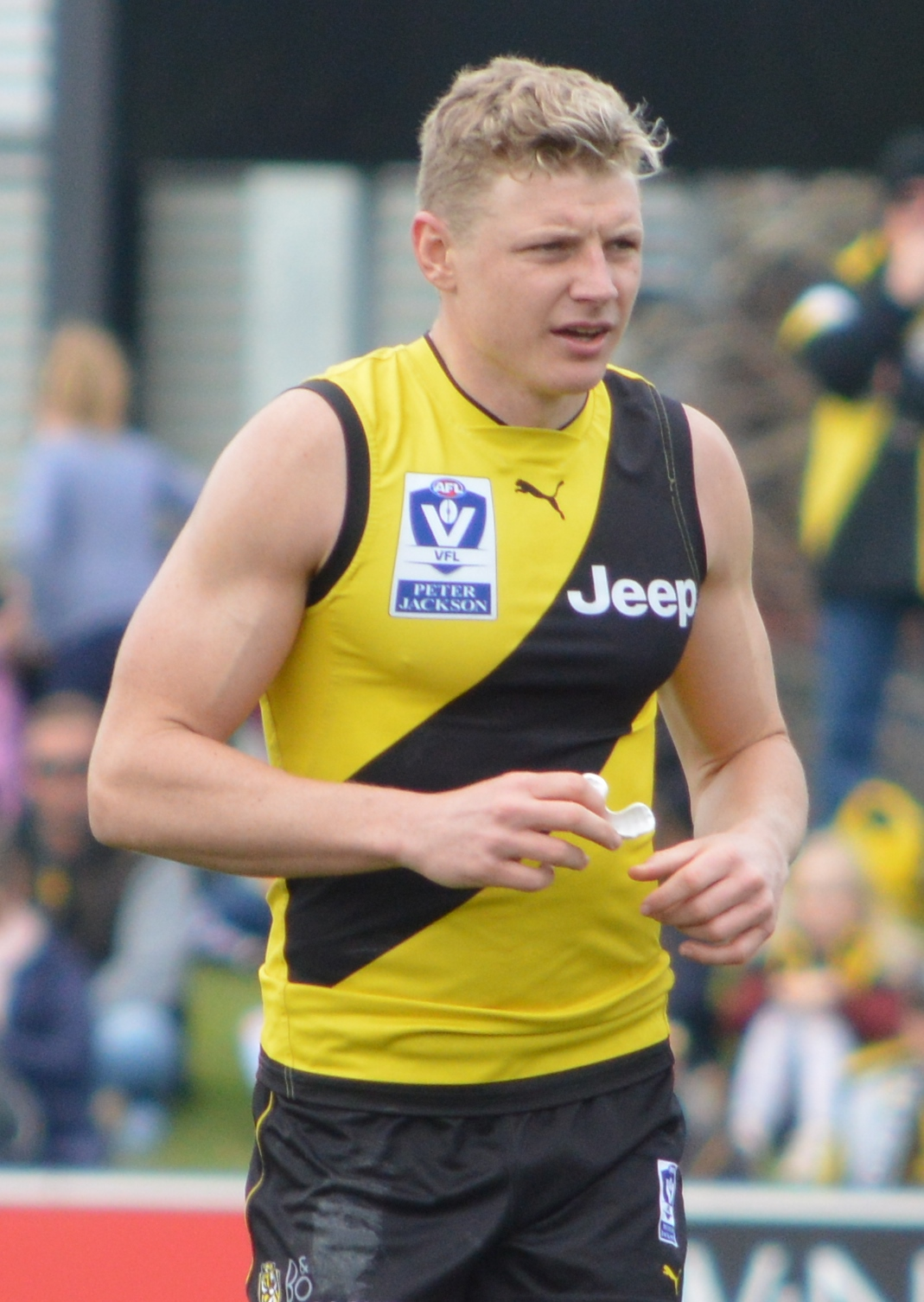
- Hunt in July 2017

Personal information
- Born: 5 November 1990 (age 36); Myrtleford
- Original teams: Sandringham Dragons (TAC Cup); Beaumaris (VAFA)
- Draft: No. 49, 2008 national draft
- Debut: Round 11, 2010, Geelong vs. West Coast, at Subiaco Oval
- Height: 184 cm (6 ft 0 in)
- Weight: 80 kg (176 lb)
- Position: Defender

Playing career^{1}
Years	Club	Games (Goals)
2010–2014	Geelong	63 (19)
2015–2017	Richmond	42 (2)
Total		105 (21)
- ^{1} Playing statistics correct to the end of 2017.

Taylor Hunt (born 5 November 1990) is a former professional Australian rules footballer who played for the Geelong Football Club and Richmond Football Club in the Australian Football League.

== AFL career ==
=== Geelong (2009–2014) ===
Hunt was selected by Geelong with the 49th pick in the 2008 AFL draft, having previously been playing with the Sandringham Dragons in the TAC Cup.

He was named as an emergency on two occasions in 2009, but failed to make his debut that season. Hunt made his AFL debut in round 11, 2010 against the West Coast Eagles at Subiaco Oval. He also kicked a goal that was nominated for goal of the week against in that match. Hunt went on to play six more games at senior level in 2010.

In 2011 he played 13 matches at AFL level, before appearing in 21 and 15 the following two seasons. He fell out of favour by 2014 however and managed just seven matches at the top level. Hunt was de-listed by Geelong at the end of that season, having played 63 matches in his six years at the club.

=== Richmond (2015–2017) ===
In November 2014, Hunt signed a one-year deal with Richmond as a de-listed free agent with Richmond.

He played in a career high 23 matches in 2015, while setting career bests for disposals and marks and receiving his only four career Brownlow Medal votes. Hunt played a further 17 matches in 2016 but only two in 2017.

Hunt was de-listed by Richmond at the conclusion of the 2017 season, having played 42 matches over three years at the club.

== Statistics ==
Legend
G	Goals	K	Kicks	D	Disposals	T	Tackles
B	Behinds	H	Handballs	M	Marks

Season	Team	No.	Games	Totals							Averages (per game)						
Season	Team	No.	Games	G	B	K	H	D	M	T	G	B	K	H	D	M	T
2009	Geelong	38	0	—	—	—	—	—	—	—	—	—	—	—	—	—	—
2010	Geelong	38	7	1	2	63	44	107	28	14	0.1	0.3	9.0	6.3	15.3	4.0	2.0
2011	Geelong	19	13	1	2	103	82	185	37	32	0.1	0.2	7.9	6.3	14.2	2.8	2.5
2012	Geelong	19	21	8	6	146	170	316	75	70	0.4	0.3	7.0	8.1	15.0	3.6	3.3
2013	Geelong	19	15	6	3	98	96	194	37	43	0.4	0.2	6.5	6.4	12.9	2.5	2.9
2014	Geelong	19	7	3	1	58	35	93	21	32	0.4	0.1	8.2	5.0	13.2	3.0	4.6
2015	Richmond	28	23	1	2	228	173	401	121	46	0.0	0.1	9.9	7.5	17.4	5.3	2.0
2016	Richmond	28	17	1	0	163	151	314	99	34	0.1	0.0	9.6	8.9	18.5	5.8	2.0
2017	Richmond	28	2	0	0	4	15	19	2	1	0.0	0.0	2.0	7.5	9.5	1.0	0.5
Career			105	21	16	863	766	1629	420	272	0.2	0.2	8.2	7.3	15.5	4.0	2.6
