= Nathan Vardy =

Australian rules footballer

Personal information
- Born: 25 June 1991 (age 35)
- Original team: Gippsland Power (TAC Cup)
- Draft: No. 42, 2009 national draft
- Height: 200 cm (6 ft 7 in)
- Weight: 100 kg (220 lb)
- Position: Ruckman / Forward

Playing career^{1}
Years	Club	Games (Goals)
2011–2016	Geelong	25 (25)
2017–2021	West Coast	52 (22)
Total		77 (47)
- ^{1} Playing statistics correct to the end of 2021.

Career highlights
- AFL premiership player: 2018

Nathan Vardy (born 25 June 1991) is a former professional Australian rules footballer who played for the West Coast Eagles in the Australian Football League (AFL). He previously played for the Geelong Football Club from 2010 to 2016.

== AFL career ==
Vardy is a mobile ruckman at 1.99 metres (6.5 ft) tall and weighing 101 kilograms (220 lb), with good skills and a fierce competitive drive. He was drafted by the Geelong Football Club with their fourth selection, and the forty-second overall draft pick in the 2009 national draft. He played four games for Vic Country at the 2009 AFL Under 18 Championships and finished equal fourth overall for hit-outs to advantage (13) and fifth for total hit-outs (59). He was selected to make his debut in round 9, 2011 against Carlton. He injured his hip against Adelaide in round 21, 2011, and was out for a calendar year. He made his return in round 23, 2012 against Sydney after proving his fitness in the reserves.

At the conclusion of the 2016 season, Vardy was traded to West Coast. In 2017, with Nic Naitanui and Scott Lycett injured, Vardy had to take charge as West Coast's number one ruckman and played almost every game.

Vardy has been the coach of Hampden Football League's (HFL) North Warrnambool since 2024, and plays for Wanderers Football Club in the Northern Territory Football League (NTFL).

Vardy’s wife, Maddison is the daughter of Alby Smedts, and is twin sister to former Geelong and Carlton player Billie Smedts.

== Statistics ==
Statistics are correct to the end of round 7, 2019

Legend
G	Goals	K	Kicks	D	Disposals	T	Tackles
B	Behinds	H	Handballs	M	Marks	H/O	Hit-outs

Season	Team	No.	Games	Totals								Averages (per game)							
Season	Team	No.	Games	G	B	K	H	D	M	T	H/O	G	B	K	H	D	M	T	H/O
2010	Geelong	36	0	—	—	—	—	—	—	—	—	—	—	—	—	—	—	—	—
2011	Geelong	36	9	6	6	29	33	62	20	18	104	0.7	0.7	3.2	3.7	6.9	2.2	2.0	11.6
2012	Geelong	36	2	2	1	11	2	13	5	3	17	1.0	0.5	5.5	1.0	6.5	2.5	1.5	8.5
2013	Geelong	30	10	11	2	45	43	88	29	19	113	1.1	0.2	4.5	4.3	8.8	2.9	1.9	11.3
2014	Geelong	30	0	—	—	—	—	—	—	—	—	—	—	—	—	—	—	—	—
2015	Geelong	30	3	5	0	19	20	39	13	8	42	1.7	0.0	6.3	6.7	13.0	4.3	2.7	14.0
2016	Geelong	30	1	1	0	2	4	6	2	5	11	1.0	0.0	2.0	4.0	6.0	2.0	5.0	11.0
2017	West Coast	19	22	10	6	99	87	186	52	64	518	0.5	0.3	4.5	4.0	8.5	2.4	2.9	23.5
2018†	West Coast	19	10	7	4	37	44	81	26	29	148	0.7	0.4	3.7	4.4	8.1	2.6	2.9	14.8
2019	West Coast	19	6	0	0	17	17	34	9	17	106	0.0	0.0	2.8	2.8	5.7	1.5	2.8	17.7
Career			63	42	19	259	250	509	156	163	1059	0.7	0.3	4.1	4.0	8.1	2.5	2.6	16.8
