= Jackson Sheringham =

Australian rules footballer

Personal information
- Full name: Jackson Sheringham
- Born: 22 June 1988 (age 38)
- Original teams: Bell Park (Geelong Football League); Geelong Falcons (TAC Cup); Geelong (VFL)
- Draft: No. 36, 2012 Rookie Draft, Geelong
- Height: 178 cm (5 ft 10 in)
- Weight: 73 kg (161 lb)

Playing career^{1}
Years	Club	Games (Goals)
2012–2014	Geelong	12 (1)
- ^{1} Playing statistics correct to the end of 2014.

Jackson Sheringham (born 22 June 1988) is a professional Australian rules football player who played for Geelong in the Australian Football League (AFL). He was recruited by the club in the 2012 Rookie Draft, with pick #36. Sheringham made his debut in Round 16, 2012, against Collingwood at the Melbourne Cricket Ground. He was delisted at the conclusion of the 2014 AFL season.
