= Mitch Brown (footballer, born 1990) =

Australian rules footballer (born 1990)

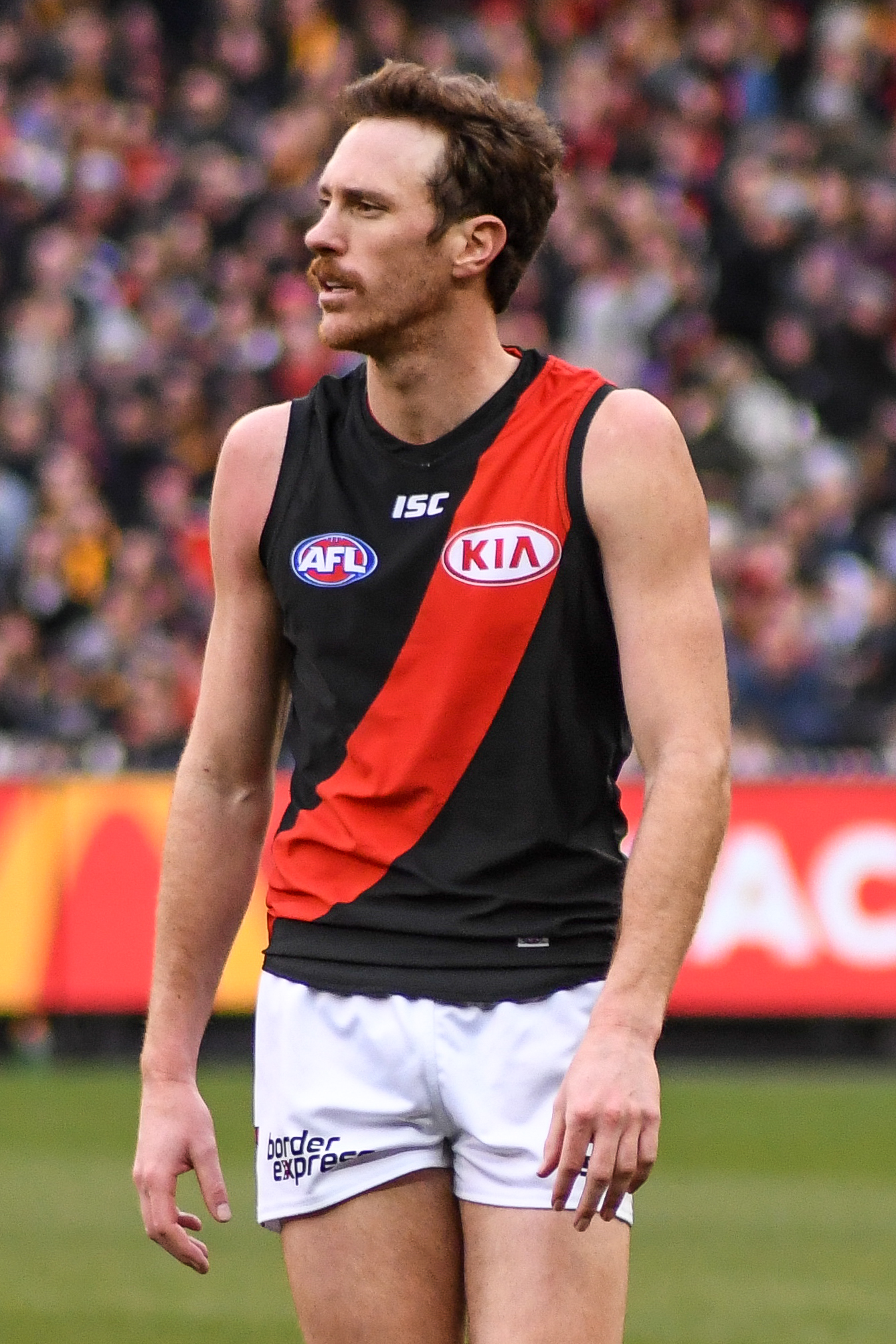
- Brown playing for Essendon in August 2018

Personal information
- Full name: Mitchell W. Brown
- Born: 28 August 1990 (age 36)
- Original teams: Cheltenham Panthers (SMJFL); Mentone Grammar (AGSV); Sandringham Dragons (TAC Cup)
- Draft: 15th overall, 2008, Geelong; 54th overall, 2015, Essendon
- Height: 196 cm (6 ft 5 in)
- Weight: 93 kg (205 lb)
- Position: Forward / Defender

Playing career^{1}
Years	Club	Games (Goals)
2009–2014	Geelong	15 (9)
2016–2019	Essendon	55 (59)
2020–2022	Melbourne	9 (6)
Total		79 (74)
- ^{1} Playing statistics correct to the end of the 2022 season.

Career highlights
- VFL premiership player: 2022

Mitchell W. Brown (born 28 August 1990) is a former Australian rules footballer who played for Geelong, Essendon, and Melbourne in the Australian Football League (AFL).

== Career ==
=== Geelong (2009–2014) ===
Brown was selected by Geelong with their first round selection (15th overall) in the 2008 AFL draft, after originally not being considered by most as a top-20 selection. He had previously been playing with the Cheltenham Panthers and the Sandringham Dragons in the TAC Cup. He was originally not selected by the Dragons until he had a growth spurt and performed well for his school, Mentone Grammar School. He has also represented Victoria at cricket at junior levels.

Brown broke his leg in a VFL practice match and missed the 2009 season. Injuries wrecked his time at Geelong and eventually Brown was delisted at the conclusion of the 2014 AFL season.

=== Essendon (2016–2019) ===
In February 2015, Brown was given a short-term contract by Essendon to play in the 2015 NAB Challenge as a "top-up" player, due to 19 Essendon players withdrawing from the NAB Challenge because of the Essendon Football Club supplements controversy. Brown played and impressed in all 3 games for Essendon in the NAB Challenge, playing as a key defender.

At the conclusion of the NAB Challenge, Brown returned to Sandringham in the VFL, where he further impressed as a "swingman", playing at both ends. Brown kicked 23 goals in his 21 games for Sandringham, and was named as the centre half-forward in the VFL team of the year.

Brown was so impressive during his NAB Challenge stint and his VFL season, that he was drafted with pick 54 to Essendon in the 2015 AFL draft.

Brown played 55 games for the Bombers across four seasons, before he was delisted at the end of the 2019 season.

=== Melbourne (2020–2022) ===
After his delisting from Essendon at the conclusion of the 2019 AFL season, Brown was signed by Melbourne during the supplementary selection period (SSP) ahead of the 2020 season.

After retiring from the AFL, Brown joined Southern Football League club Mordialloc.

== Statistics ==
Updated to the end of the 2022 season.

Legend
G	Goals	K	Kicks	D	Disposals	T	Tackles
B	Behinds	H	Handballs	M	Marks

Season	Team	No.	Games	Totals							Averages (per game)							Votes
Season	Team	No.	Games	G	B	K	H	D	M	T	G	B	K	H	D	M	T	Votes
2009	Geelong	1	0	—	—	—	—	—	—	—	—	—	—	—	—	—	—	—
2010	Geelong	1	0	—	—	—	—	—	—	—	—	—	—	—	—	—	—	—
2011	Geelong	1	2	3	2	14	3	17	6	2	1.5	1.0	7.0	1.5	8.5	3.0	1.0	0
2012	Geelong	1	3	2	2	16	7	23	11	4	0.7	0.7	5.3	2.3	7.7	3.7	1.3	0
2013	Geelong	1	5	0	2	37	21	58	22	4	0.0	0.4	7.4	4.2	11.6	4.4	0.8	0
2014	Geelong	1	5	4	3	37	19	56	17	11	0.8	0.6	7.4	3.8	11.2	3.4	2.2	0
2016	Essendon	28	21	20	17	198	103	301	130	37	1.0	0.8	9.4	4.9	14.3	6.2	1.8	0
2017	Essendon	28	4	0	0	40	29	69	20	5	0.0	0.0	10.0	7.3	17.3	5.0	1.3	0
2018	Essendon	28	14	18	7	124	64	188	92	22	1.3	0.5	8.9	4.6	13.4	6.6	1.6	0
2019	Essendon	28	16	21	13	146	74	220	96	16	1.3	0.8	9.1	4.6	13.8	6.0	1.0	1
2020 (Note: The 2020 season was played with 17 home-and-away matches per team (down from 22) and 16-minute quarters with time on (down from 20-minute quarters with time on) due to the impact of the COVID-19 pandemic.)	Melbourne	38	5	2	3	39	18	57	30	6	0.4	0.6	7.8	3.6	11.4	6.0	1.2	2
2021	Melbourne	38	1	2	2	8	2	10	6	3	2.0	2.0	8.0	2.0	10.0	6.0	3.0	0
2022	Melbourne	38	3	2	0	16	8	24	11	7	0.7	0.0	5.3	2.7	8.0	3.7	2.3	0
Career			79	74	51	675	348	1023	441	117	0.9	0.6	8.5	4.4	12.9	5.6	1.5	3
