= Dawson Simpson =

Australian rules footballer

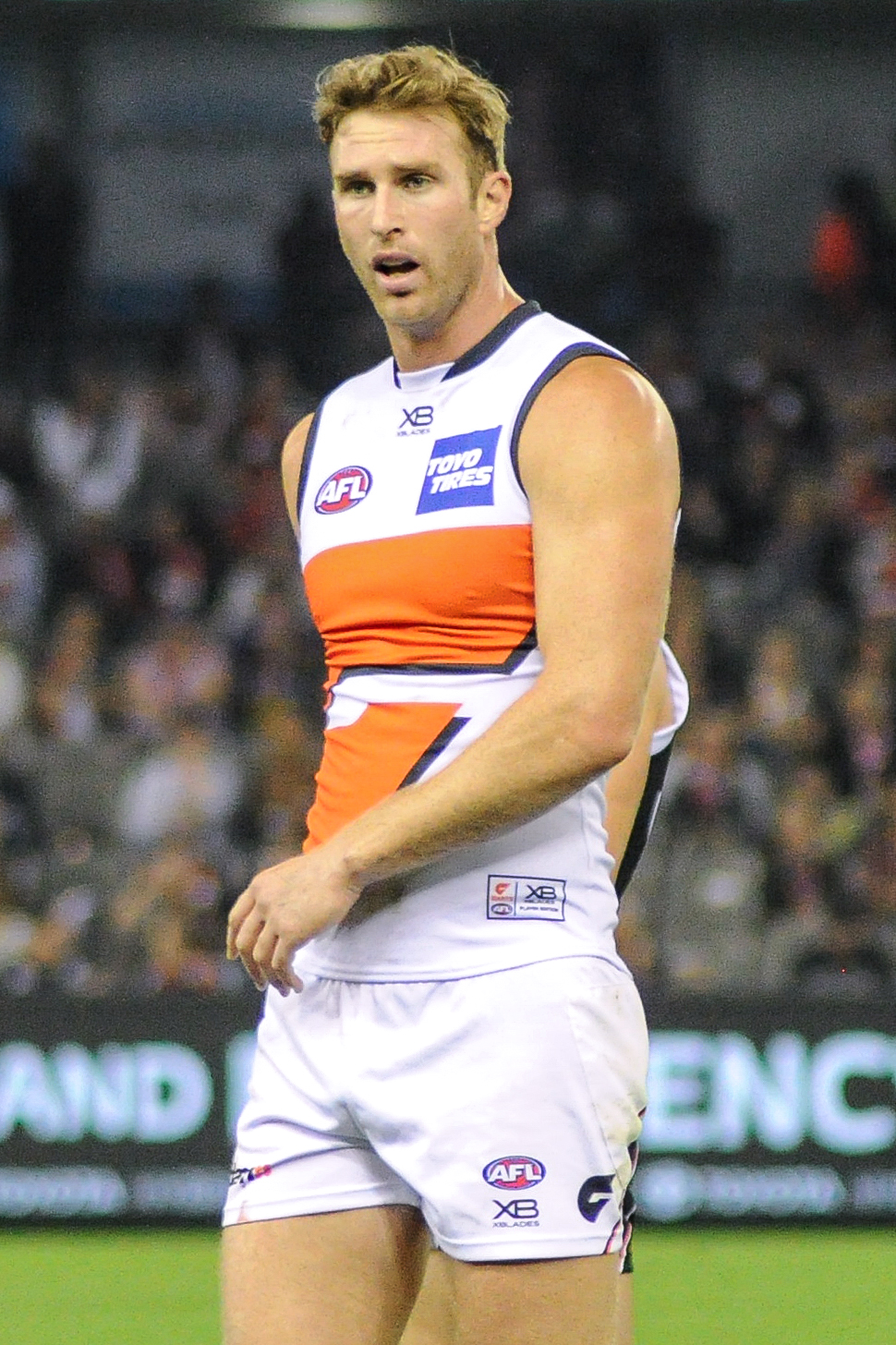
- Simpson playing for Greater Western Sydney in April 2018

Personal information
- Full name: Dawson Simpson
- Born: 17 February 1989 (age 37)
- Original teams: Barnawartha (TDFL); Murray Bushrangers (TAC Cup)
- Draft: No. 34, 2007 national draft
- Height: 210 cm (6 ft 11 in)
- Weight: 109 kg (240 lb)
- Position: Ruckman

Playing career^{1}
Years	Club	Games (Goals)
2010–2015	Geelong	28 (4)
2017–2019	Greater Western Sydney	20 (1)
Total		48 (5)
- ^{1} Playing statistics correct to the end of 2019.

Dawson Simpson (born 17 February 1989) is a former professional Australian rules footballer who played for the Geelong Football Club and Greater Western Sydney Giants in the Australian Football League (AFL). He played as a ruckman, and was drafted by Geelong from the Murray Bushrangers in the 2007 national draft.

In October 2015, he joined GWS as an unrestricted free agent after only 28 games for Geelong over an eight-year period.

He retired at the conclusion of the 2019 AFL season.

== Statistics ==
Statistics are correct to end of round 5, 2015. Averages are in brackets.

Season	Team	#	Games	Disposals	Kicks	Handballs	Marks	Tackles	Goals	Behinds
2008	Geelong	16	—	—	—	—	—	—	—	—
2009	Geelong	16	—	—	—	—	—	—	—	—
2010	Geelong	16	2	14 (7.0)	6 (3.0)	8 (4.0)	7 (3.5)	6 (3.0)	0 (0.0)	0 (0.0)
2011	Geelong	16	1	9 (9.0)	2 (2.0)	7 (7.0)	4 (4.0)	4 (4.0)	0 (0.0)	0 (0.0)
2012	Geelong	16	2	8 (4.0)	4 (2.0)	4 (2.0)	3 (1.5)	4 (2.0)	0 (0.0)	1 (0.5)
2013	Geelong	16	6	59 (9.8)	22 (3.7)	37 (6.2)	21 (3.5)	12 (2.0)	1 (0.2)	1 (0.2)
2014	Geelong	16	13	79 (6.1)	21 (1.6)	58 (4.5)	18 (1.4)	34 (2.6)	3 (0.2)	2 (0.2)
2015	Geelong	16	3	21 (7.0)	6 (2.0)	15 (5.0)	2 (0.7)	9 (3.0)	0 (0.0)	0 (0.0)
2016	GWS	26	—	—	—	—	—	—	—	—
Career totals			27	190 (7.0)	61 (2.3)	129 (4.8)	55 (2.0)	69 (2.6)	4 (0.1)	4 (0.1)
