= James Podsiadly =

Australian rules footballer (born 1981)

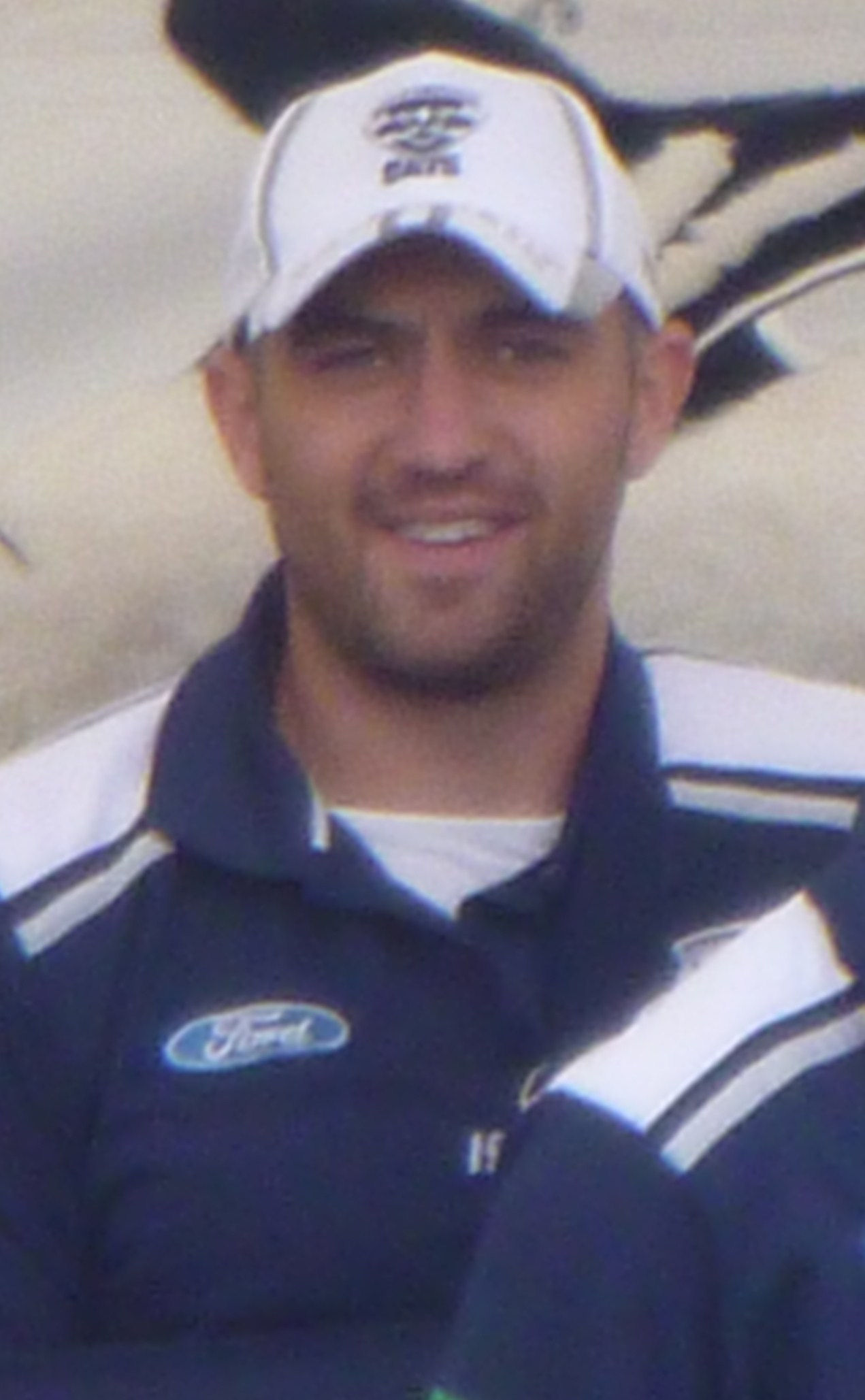
- James Podsiadly

Personal information
- Full name: James Podsiadly
- Nicknames: Pods, Jpod
- Born: 10 September 1981 (age 45); Melbourne, Victoria
- Original teams: Yarraville (WRFL); Western Jets (TAC Cup); Werribee (VFL); Geelong (VFL)
- Draft: No. 58, 1999 rookie draft, Essendon; No. 8, 2001 rookie draft, Collingwood; No. 50, 2009 rookie draft, Geelong; No. 58 (RP), 2010 national draft, Geelong
- Debut: Round 3, 2010, Geelong vs. Fremantle, at Subiaco Oval
- Height: 193 cm (6 ft 4 in)
- Weight: 100 kg (15 st 10 lb; 220 lb)
- Position: Forward

Playing career^{1}
Years	Club	Games (Goals)
2010–2013	Geelong	83 (169)
2014–2015	Adelaide	21 (26)
Total		104 (195)
- ^{1} Playing statistics correct to the end of 2015.

Career highlights
- AFL Premiership (Geelong, 2011); Geelong leading goalkicker (2011); Frosty Miller medal (2005); J. J. Liston Trophy (2008); Adelaide Football Club leading goalkicker (2015), (SANFL)

James Podsiadly (born 10 September 1981) is a former professional Australian rules football player who played for the Geelong Football Club and the Adelaide Football Club in the Australian Football League (AFL). He was drafted by Geelong as a mature-age rookie at pick #50 in the 2010 rookie draft and was traded to Adelaide after the 2013 season.

== Early life ==
Podsiadly grew up in the Melbourne suburb of Spotswood and played soccer and tennis before taking up Australian football seriously at the age of 17. When Podsiadly was 10, his grandfather became a significant influence in his life. His grandfather was a soldier in the Polish army during World War II, was captured and spent 12 months in a concentration camp near the German town of Arnsberg. His grandfather and grandmother emigrated to Australia in the mid-1940s.

== Pre-VFL career ==
Originally playing for the Yarraville Football Club and the Western Jets, Podsiadly was recruited by Essendon in the 1999 AFL Rookie Draft with pick 58. After playing 19 games with Essendon's reserves team in the VFL, Podsiadly was de-listed but was once again drafted as Collingwood selected him in the 2001 AFL Rookie Draft with the eighth pick.

Podsiadly played three games for Collingwood in the AFL pre-Season competition of 2002. However, he did not play senior football during the regular season and was delisted at the end of the year. He played for Collingwood's VFL-affiliate Williamstown over that time, and was the club's leading goalkicker in 2002.

== VFL career ==
Before being recruited back to an AFL list, Podsiadly played seven seasons in the Victorian Football League (VFL). He qualified for VFL life membership in 2009, represented the VFL in three state games and was named in the VFL's team of the year in 2005, 2006, 2008 and 2009.

=== Werribee (2003–2008) ===
Podsiadly was recruited by the VFL club Werribee for the 2003 season. He won the club's best & fairest award and the Frosty Miller medal as the VFL's leading goalkicker in 2005, breaking Nick Sautner's six-year winning streak. During the 2005 AFL pre-season he trained with Werribee's former AFL affiliate, the Western Bulldogs and then in 2006 with Richmond.

During the 2008 VFL season, Podsiadly played his 100th game for Werribee and won his second best and fairest at the club. He also won the 2008 J. J. Liston Trophy.

=== Geelong VFL (2009) ===
After six seasons with Werribee, Podsiadly left the club to take up a dual role as a player and fitness coach at the Geelong VFL club. He captained the side in the 2009 VFL season, won the club's best & fairest award and was their leading goal-kicker, with 68 goals.

== AFL career ==
=== Geelong (2010–2013) ===
Podsiadly was selected as a mature-age rookie by Geelong in the 2009 AFL rookie draft at the age of 28 and played his first AFL game against Fremantle in round three of 2010. He was awarded 13 Brownlow Medal votes in his first year of AFL football.

During the 2011 season, Podsiadly kicked 52 goals and averaged over 12 disposals per game. Podsiadly played in the 2011 AFL Grand Final, where Geelong beat Collingwood. He was substituted out of the game in the second quarter after suffering a shoulder injury. He went on to play 18 and 16 games in the 2012 and 2013 seasons respectively.

At the end of the 2013 season, Geelong delisted Podsiadly, who thereby became an unrestricted free agent. He indicated that he was interested in playing with another club in 2014. On the last day of the 2013 free agency period, Podsiadly was traded for draft pick number 64 to Adelaide (rather than as a free agent), and signed a two-year contract.

=== Adelaide (2014–2015) ===
Podsiadly started well at his new club in 2014, missing only one game for the season. He took 41 contested marks, ranked fourth in the AFL, and kicked 26 goals in 21 games, swinging between attack and defence. In round 18, Podsiadly played his 100th AFL game against Collingwood at the MCG.

Podsiadly announced his retirement at the end of the 2015 AFL season, during which he failed to play a senior game for the Crows.

== Statistics ==
Legend
G	Goals	K	Kicks	D	Disposals	T	Tackles
B	Behinds	H	Handballs	M	Marks

Season	Team	No.	Games	Totals							Averages (per game)						
Season	Team	No.	Games	G	B	K	H	D	M	T	G	B	K	H	D	M	T
2010	Geelong	31	19	49	28	164	89	253	130	40	2.6	1.5	8.6	4.7	13.3	6.8	2.1
2011	Geelong	31	23	52	38	189	92	281	130	48	2.3	1.6	8.2	4.0	12.2	5.7	2.1
2012	Geelong	31	18	35	13	153	62	215	90	50	1.9	0.7	8.5	3.4	11.9	5.0	2.8
2013	Geelong	31	23	33	18	218	102	320	135	52	1.4	0.8	9.5	4.4	13.9	5.9	2.3
2014	Adelaide	1	21	26	14	189	101	290	119	37	1.2	0.7	9.0	4.8	13.8	5.7	1.8
2015	Adelaide	1	0	—	—	—	—	—	—	—	—	—	—	—	—	—	—
Career			104	195	111	913	446	1359	604	227	1.9	1.1	8.8	4.3	13.1	5.8	2.2
