= 2011 Geelong Football Club season =

Geelong Football Club
2011 season
- President: Colin Carter
- Coach: Chris Scott (1st season)
- Captain: Cameron Ling
- Home ground: Skilled Stadium
- Pre-season competition: quarter-finals
- AFL season: 2nd
- Finals series: Premiers
- Best and Fairest: Corey Enright
- Leading goalkicker: James Podsiadly (52)
- Highest home attendance: 81,691 vs. Collingwood (Round 8)
- Lowest home attendance: 22,420 vs. Port Adelaide (Round 3)
- Average home attendance: 35,401
- Club membership: 39,343

The 2011 Geelong Football Club season was the club's 112th season in the Australian Football League (AFL). Geelong finished the regular season in second position on the ladder with 19 wins and three losses, resulting in qualification for the 2011 AFL finals series. Geelong then proceeded to win its qualifying and preliminary finals in succession to earn a place in the 2011 AFL Grand Final, where it defeated the minor premiers Collingwood to claim the AFL Premiership.

== Club list ==
=== Changes from 2010 list ===
==== Additions ====
- Exchange period (received):
  - None
- Promoted rookie:
1. James Podsiadly
- Father/son selection:
  - None
- 2010 AFL draft (18 November 2010):
1. Billie Smedts (Round 1; Overall pick 15; from Geelong Falcons)
2. Cameron Guthrie (Round 1; Overall pick 23; from Calder Cannons)
3. George Horlin-Smith (Round 2; Overall pick 37; from Sturt)
4. Jordan Schroder (Round 3; Overall pick 54; from Calder Cannons)
- 2011 Pre-season Draft (7 December 2010):
  - None
- 2011 Rookie Draft (7 December 2010):
1. Josh Walker (Round 1; Overall pick 23; from Geelong Falcons)
2. George Burbury (Round 2; Overall pick 40; from Hobart)
3. Jonathan Simpkin (Round 3; Overall pick 56; from Geelong VFL)
4. Ryan Bathie (Round 4; Overall pick 71; Three-year non-registered selection)

==== Deletions ====
- Uncontracted player selection (Gold Coast):
  - Gary Ablett, Jr. – received two first-round compensation selections (Mid round one and end round one) that can be used in any of the 2011 to 2014 National Drafts.
- Exchange period (traded):
  - Nathan Djerrkura – to Western Bulldogs (received Western Bulldogs' third-round draft selection: overall pick 57)
  - Jeremy Laidler and Draft pick No. 41 – to Carlton (received Carlton's second and third-round draft selections: overall picks 36 and 53)
- Delisted:
  - Tom Allwright (from Rookie list)
  - Ranga Ediriwickrama (from Rookie list)
  - Ryan Gamble
  - Adam Varcoe (from Rookie list)
- Retirements:
  - Max Rooke

=== Playing list ===
Players are listed in alphabetical order by surname, and statistics are for AFL regular season and finals series matches during the 2011 AFL season only.

^	Denotes player who is on the club's rookie list
#	Denotes nominated rookie where player has been elevated to club's senior list during season, and therefore eligible for senior selection.
†	Denotes player who is on the club's veteran list

Geelong's 2011 playing list
Player	#	AFL debut	Games	Goals	Behinds	Kicks	Handballs	Disposals	Marks	Tackles
Jimmy Bartel	3	2002	24	26	6	325	204	529	142	94
Ryan Bathie^	47									
Mark Blake	24	2005								
Mitch Brown	1	2011	2	3	2	14	3	17	6	2
George Burbury^	43									
Shannon Byrnes	17	2004	5	5	2	31	16	47	8	5
Paul Chapman	35	2000	23	24	14	312	228	540	122	104
Allen Christensen	28	2011	19	18	11	154	150	304	59	70
Joel Corey	11	2000	21	8	5	257	262	519	77	90
Josh Cowan	18	2011	3	1	1	14	16	30	10	8
Marcus Drum	23	2006								
Mitch Duncan	22	2010	21	22	10	192	165	357	100	49
Corey Enright	44	2001	23	1	0	330	183	513	144	64
Tom Gillies	25	2009	2	0	0	8	8	16	4	1
Cameron Guthrie	29	2011	2	0	0	8	13	21	4	5
Tom Hawkins	26	2007	18	27	17	125	98	223	88	38
Simon Hogan	34	2009	1	0	0	1	6	7	0	3
George Horlin-Smith	33									
Josh Hunt	8	2001	22	4	1	203	141	344	103	58
Taylor Hunt	19	2010	13	1	2	103	82	185	37	32
Ben Johnson^	38									
Steve Johnson	20	2002	23	50	37	319	195	514	143	84
James Kelly	9	2002	24	5	12	319	258	577	62	186
Cameron Ling	45	2000	21	17	9	265	192	457	74	92
Tom Lonergan	13	2005	21	0	0	99	108	207	80	44
Andrew Mackie	4	2004	22	4	3	287	146	433	122	59
Daniel Menzel	10	2010	18	28	15	153	68	221	82	31
Darren Milburn †	39	1997	14	3	0	135	120	255	76	24
Cameron Mooney	21	1999	8	9	8	57	51	108	36	17
Steven Motlop	32	2010	4	2	3	23	12	35	4	7
Brad Ottens	6	1998	20	15	9	87	173	270	73	70
James Podsiadly	31	2010	23	52	38	189	92	281	130	48
Matthew Scarlett †	30	1998	22	1	1	211	154	365	115	44
Jordan Schroder	15									
Joel Selwood	14	2007	20	15	12	296	222	518	82	125
Jonathan Simpkin^	46									
Dawson Simpson	16	2010	1	0	0	2	7	9	4	4
Billie Smedts	2									
Mathew Stokes	27	2006	22	29	16	208	233	441	95	70
Jesse Stringer^	41									
Harry Taylor	7	2008	24	0	2	208	148	356	144	46
Travis Varcoe	5	2007	24	31	17	187	202	389	57	51
Nathan Vardy	36	2011	9	6	6	29	33	62	20	18
Josh Walker^	42									
Trent West	12	2008	9	7	2	51	32	83	25	36
Jack Weston^	37									
David Wojcinski	40	1999	22	12	9	162	173	335	76	49

== Season summary ==
=== Pre-season matches ===
==== NAB Cup ====
**Round**	**Date and local time**	**Opponent**	**Scores** (Geelong's scores indicated in **bold**)			**Venue**	**Attendance**
**Round**	**Date and local time**	**Opponent**	Home	Away	Result	**Venue**	**Attendance**
**Pool matches**
1	Sunday, 20 February (3:45 pm)	North Melbourne	**0.4.8 (32)**	0.2.2 (14)	Won by 18 points	Skilled Stadium **[H]**	13,232 (approx.)
1	Sunday, 20 February (5:55 pm)	Western Bulldogs	**0.7.4 (46)**	0.4.1 (25)	Won by 21 points	Skilled Stadium **[H]**	13,232 (approx.)
**Finals**
QF	Saturday, 26 February (7:10 pm)	St Kilda	**1.6.6 (51)**	1.15.7 (106)	Lost by 55 points	Etihad Stadium **[H]**	9,670
Eliminated from NAB Cup

==== NAB Challenge ====
**Week**	**Date and local time**	**Opponent**	**Scores** (Geelong's scores indicated in **bold**)			**Venue**	**Attendance**
**Week**	**Date and local time**	**Opponent**	Home	Away	Result	**Venue**	**Attendance**
2	Friday, 4 March (7:00 pm)	Port Adelaide	19.21 (135)	**7.9 (51)**	Lost by 84 points	AAMI Stadium **[A]**	4,110
3	Saturday, 12 March (1:00 pm)	Carlton	11.15 (81)	**14.8 (92)**	Won by 11 points	Visy Park **[A]**	8,000 (approx.)

=== Regular season ===
**Round**	**Date and local time**	**Opponent**	**Scores** (Geelong's scores indicated in **bold**)			**Venue**	**Attendance**	**Ladder** **position**
**Round**	**Date and local time**	**Opponent**	Home	Away	Result	**Venue**	**Attendance**	**Ladder** **position**
1	Friday, 25 March (7:40 pm)	St Kilda	**6.12 (48)**	6.11 (47)	Won by 1 point	MCG **[H]**	42,869	7th
2	Saturday, 2 April (5:40 pm)	Fremantle	10.18 (78)	**13.11 (89)**	Won by 11 points	Patersons Stadium **[A]**	37,004	4th
3	Sunday, 10 April (2:10 pm)	Port Adelaide	**17.20 (122)**	6.7 (43)	Won by 79 points	Skilled Stadium **[H]**	22,420	2nd
4	Saturday, 16 April (7:10 pm)	Sydney	7.12 (54)	**11.15 (81)**	Won by 27 points	SCG **[A]**	25,300	2nd
5	Tuesday, 26 April (2:40 pm)	Hawthorn	15.8 (98)	**17.15 (117)**	Won by 19 points	MCG **[A]**	78,579	2nd
6	Bye							2nd
7	Saturday, 7 May (2:10 pm)	North Melbourne	**19.13 (127)**	9.7 (61)	Won by 66 points	Skilled Stadium **[H]**	23,669	2nd
8	Friday, 13 May (7:40 pm)	Collingwood	**8.17 (65)**	9.8 (62)	Won by 3 points	MCG **[H]**	81,691	1st
9	Friday, 20 May (7:40 pm)	Carlton	14.16 (100)	**15.12 (102)**	Won by 2 points	Etihad Stadium **[A]**	48,429	1st
10	Saturday, 28 May (7:10 pm)	Gold Coast	10.13 (73)	**21.13 (139)**	Won by 66 points	Metricon Stadium **[A]**	21,485	1st
11	Saturday, 4 June (2:10 pm)	Western Bulldogs	**23.10 (148)**	13.9 (87)	Won by 61 points	Skilled Stadium **[H]**	25,078	1st
12	Saturday, 11 June (7:10 pm)	Hawthorn	**13.10 (88)**	13.5 (83)	Won by 5 points	MCG **[H]**	63,476	1st
13	Saturday, 18 June (7:10 pm)	St Kilda	11.6 (72)	**15.10 (100)**	Won by 28 points	MCG **[A]**	39,539	1st
14	Sunday, 26 June (1:10 pm)	Adelaide	**19.11 (125)**	10.13 (73)	Won by 52 points	Skilled Stadium **[H]**	23,246	1st
15	Saturday, 2 July (7:10 pm)	Essendon	18.7 (115)	**16.15 (111)**	Lost by 4 points	Etihad Stadium **[A]**	43,806	1st
16	Friday, 8 July (6:10 pm)	West Coast	14.12 (96)	**13.10 (88)**	Lost by 8 points	Patersons Stadium **[A]**	40,164	2nd
17	Sunday, 17 July (2:40 pm)	Brisbane Lions	15.14 (104)	**20.13 (133)**	Won by 29 points	Gabba **[A]**	19,906	2nd
18	Sunday, 24 July (1:10 pm)	Richmond	**17.11 (113)**	7.9 (51)	Won by 62 points	Etihad Stadium **[H]**	33,761	2nd
19	Saturday, 30 July (2:10 pm)	Melbourne	**37.11 (233)**	7.5 (47)	Won by 186 points	Skilled Stadium **[H]**	22,716	2nd
20	Saturday, 6 August (1:40 pm)^{[a]}	Gold Coast	**29.14 (188)**	6.2 (38)	Won by 150 points	Skilled Stadium **[H]**	24,588	2nd
21	Sunday, 14 August (4:10 pm)	Adelaide	12.13 (85)	**14.12 (96)**	Won by 11 points	AAMI Stadium **[A]**	33,576	2nd
22	Bye							2nd
23	Saturday, 27 August (2:10 pm)	Sydney	**12.14 (86)**	15.9 (99)	Lost by 13 points	Skilled Stadium **[H]**	25,900	2nd
24	Friday, 2 September (7:40 pm)	Collingwood	8.5 (53)	**22.17 (149)**	Won by 96 points	MCG **[A]**	85,705	2nd

=== Finals ===
**Date and local time**	**Opponent**	**Scores** (Geelong's scores indicated in **bold**)			**Venue**	**Attendance**
**Date and local time**	**Opponent**	Home	Away	Result	**Venue**	**Attendance**
**Qualifying and Elimination Finals (Second Qualifying Final)**
Friday, 9 September (7:45 pm)	Hawthorn	**14.14 (98)**	9.13 (67)	Won by 31 points	MCG **[H]**	73,400
**Preliminary Finals (Second Preliminary Final)**
Saturday, 24 September (2:20 pm)	West Coast	**17.15 (117)**	10.9 (69)	Won by 48 points	MCG **[H]**	59,455
**Grand Final**
Saturday, 1 October (2:30 pm)	Collingwood	12.9 (81)	**18.11 (119)**	Won by 38 points	MCG **[H]**	99,537
Geelong were the 2011 AFL premiers.

== Ladder ==
2011 AFL ladder
Pos	Team	Pld	W	L	D	PF	PA	PP	Pts	
1	Collingwood	22	20	2	0	2592	1546	167.7	80	Finals series
2	Geelong (P)	22	19	3	0	2548	1619	157.4	76	Finals series
3	Hawthorn	22	18	4	0	2355	1634	144.1	72	Finals series
4	West Coast	22	17	5	0	2235	1715	130.3	68	Finals series
5	Carlton	22	14	7	1	2225	1700	130.9	58	Finals series
6	St Kilda	22	12	9	1	1891	1677	112.8	50	Finals series
7	Sydney	22	12	9	1	1897	1735	109.3	50	Finals series
8	Essendon	22	11	10	1	2217	2217	100.0	46	Finals series
9	North Melbourne	22	10	12	0	2106	2082	101.2	40	
10	Western Bulldogs	22	9	13	0	2060	2155	95.6	36	
11	Fremantle	22	9	13	0	1791	2155	83.1	36	
12	Richmond	22	8	13	1	2069	2396	86.4	34	
13	Melbourne	22	8	13	1	1974	2315	85.3	34	
14	Adelaide	22	7	15	0	1742	2193	79.4	28	
15	Brisbane Lions	22	4	18	0	1814	2240	81.0	16	
16	Port Adelaide	22	3	19	0	1718	2663	64.5	12	
17	Gold Coast	22	3	19	0	1534	2726	56.3	12	

Source: AFL ladder
Rules for classification: 1) points; 2) percentage; 3) number of points for.
(P) Premiers

== Teams ==
Geelong's 2011 teams (Rounds 1 to 4)

Geelong's Round 1 team				Geelong's Round 2 team			Geelong's Round 3 team			Geelong's Round 4 team
B:	Enright	Scarlett	J. Hunt	Mackie	Taylor	J. Hunt	Milburn	Scarlett	J. Hunt	T. Hunt	Scarlett	Enright
HB:	Mackie	Taylor	Lonergan	Enright	Milburn	Corey	Enright	Taylor (substituted off)	T. Hunt	Mackie	Taylor	Lonergan
C:	Kelly	Duncan	Corey	Guthrie (substituted off)	Ling	T. Hunt	S. Johnson	Ling	Kelly	Wojcinski	Ling	Kelly
HF:	Varcoe	Mooney	Stokes	Varcoe	S. Johnson	Chapman	Varcoe	Mooney	Stokes	Christensen	S. Johnson	Varcoe
F:	Menzel	Hawkins	S. Johnson	Duncan	Podsiadly	Stokes	Chapman	Hawkins	Bartel	Menzel	Podsiadly	Chapman
Foll:	Ottens	Bartel	Selwood (substituted off)	Ottens	Bartel	Kelly	Ottens	Corey	Selwood	Ottens	Corey	Bartel
Int:	Guthrie	Wojcinski	T. Hunt	Wojcinski	Hawkins	Menzel	Duncan	Menzel	Podsiadly	J. Hunt (substituted off)	Mooney	Selwood
Sub:	Milburn (substituted on) 1st'			Christensen (substituted on) 3rd'			Christensen (substituted on) 3rd'			Milburn (substituted on) 3rd'
Emg:	Chapman	Christensen	Cowan	Cowan	Gillies	Simpson	Cowan	Gillies	West	Cowan	Gillies	West
Coach:	Chris Scott			Chris Scott			Chris Scott			Chris Scott
▲ In:	N/A			Chapman, Christensen, Ling, Podsiadly			Mooney, Scarlett, Selwood			Lonergan, Mackie, Wojcinski
▼ Out:	N/A			Lonergan, Mooney, Scarlett, Selwood			Guthrie, Mackie, Wojcinski			Duncan, Hawkins, Stokes

Geelong's 2011 teams (Rounds 5 to 8)

Geelong's Round 5 team				Geelong's Round 6 team	Geelong's Round 7 team			Geelong's Round 8 team
B:	T. Hunt (substituted off)	Scarlett	Enright	Bye	J. Hunt	Scarlett	Lonergan	Enright	Lonergan	J. Hunt
HB:	Milburn	Taylor	Lonergan	Bye	Enright	Taylor	Wojcinski	Mackie	Taylor	Scarlett
C:	Wojcinski	Ling	Kelly	Bye	Mackie	Corey	Stokes	Stokes	Corey	Wojcinski
HF:	Varcoe	S. Johnson	Selwood	Bye	Bartel	Mooney	Kelly	Chapman	S. Johnson	Varcoe
F:	Hawkins	Podsiadly	Chapman	Bye	Chapman	Podsiadly	Hawkins	Ling (substituted off)	Podsiadly	Menzel
Foll:	Ottens	Corey	Bartel	Bye	Ottens (substituted off)	Varcoe	Selwood	Ottens	Bartel	Selwood
Int:	Duncan	Mackie	Stokes	Bye	Duncan	Menzel	Milburn	Duncan	Hawkins	Kelly
Sub:	Menzel (substituted on) 1st'			Bye	Christensen (substituted on) Half-time'			Christensen (substituted on) 3rd'
Emg:	Christensen	J. Hunt	~~Stokes~~	Bye	~~Christensen~~	Cowan	Vardy	~~Christensen~~	Cowan	Vardy
Coach:	Chris Scott			Bye	Chris Scott			Chris Scott
▲ In:	Duncan, Hawkins, Stokes (late change)			Bye	J. Hunt, Mooney, Christensen (late change)			S. Johnson, Ling
▼ Out:	Christensen, J. Hunt, Mooney (late change)			Bye	T. Hunt, Ling, S. Johnson (late change)			Mooney, Milburn (late change)

Geelong's 2011 teams (Rounds 9 to 12)

Geelong's Round 9 team				Geelong's Round 10 team			Geelong's Round 11 team			Geelong's Round 12 team
B:	Milburn	Taylor	J. Hunt	Scarlett	Milburn	J. Hunt	J. Hunt	Lonergan	Scarlett	J. Hunt	Lonergan	Scarlett
HB:	T. Hunt	Scarlett	Enright	T. Hunt	Lonergan	Mackie	Enright	Taylor	T. Hunt	Enright	Taylor	T. Hunt
C:	Mackie	Corey	Bartel	Kelly	Ling	Chapman	Bartel	Ling	Mackie	Bartel	Ling	Selwood
HF:	Stokes	Selwood	S. Johnson	Varcoe	Hawkins (substituted off)	S. Johnson	S. Johnson	Vardy	Stokes	Chapman	Podsiadly	Kelly
F:	Vardy (substituted off)	Podsiadly	Chapman	Menzel	Mooney	Stokes	Menzel	Podsiadly	Duncan	S. Johnson	Ottens	Menzel
Foll:	Ottens	Christensen	Kelly	Vardy	Selwood	Bartel	Ottens	Selwood	Corey	Vardy	Varcoe (substituted off)	Corey
Int:	Duncan	Hawkins	Varcoe	Corey	Podsiadly	Wojcinski	Cowan	Kelly (substituted off)	Wojcinski	Duncan	Mackie	Stokes
Sub:	Wojcinski (substituted on) 3rd'			Cowan (substituted on) 3rd'			Varcoe (substituted on) 3rd'			Milburn (substituted on) Three-quarter time'
Emg:	Cowan	Gillies	Motlop	Gillies	Guthrie	~~Menzel~~	Christensen	~~Duncan~~	Hawkins	Cowan	Christensen	Hawkins
Coach:	Chris Scott			Chris Scott			Chris Scott			Chris Scott
▲ In:	T. Hunt, Milburn, Vardy			Cowan, Ling, Lonergan, Mooney, Menzel (late change)			Enright, Ottens, Taylor, Duncan (late change)			Chapman, Milburn
▼ Out:	Ling, Lonergan, Menzel			Christensen, Enright, Ottens, Taylor, Duncan (late change)			Chapman, Hawkins, Mooney, Milburn (late change)			Cowan, Wojcinski

Geelong's 2011 teams (Rounds 13 to 16)

Geelong's Round 13 team				Geelong's Round 14 team			Geelong's Round 15 team			Geelong's Round 16 team
B:	Scarlett	Lonergan	Mackie	Mackie	Lonergan	Scarlett (substituted off)	Lonergan (substituted off)	Scarlett	J. Hunt	Lonergan	Scarlett	J. Hunt
HB:	Wojcinski	Taylor	J. Hunt	Wojcinski	Taylor	T. Hunt	Wojcinski	Taylor	Enright	Enright	Taylor	T. Hunt
C:	Enright	Ling	Bartel (substituted off)	Enright	Ling	Duncan	Duncan	Kelly	Mackie	Wojcinski	Kelly	Duncan (substituted off)
HF:	Menzel	Podsiadly	T. Hunt	Menzel	Podsiadly	Christensen	Christensen	Vardy	Chapman	Stokes	S. Johnson	Varcoe
F:	S. Johnson	Vardy	Corey	S. Johnson	Brown	Motlop	Brown	Podsiadly	S. Johnson	Chapman	Podsiadly	Menzel
Foll:	Ottens	Kelly	Chapman	Simpson	Corey	Chapman	Ottens	Ling	Bartel	Ottens	Ling	Corey
Int:	Milburn	Stokes	Varcoe	Gillies	Hawkins	Varcoe	Menzel	Motlop	Stokes	Bartel	Christensen	Vardy
Sub:	Duncan (substituted on) Quarter-time'			Byrnes (substituted on) 3rd'			Gillies (substituted on) 3rd'			Motlop (substituted on) 3rd'
Emg:	Brown	Christensen	Cowan	Cowan	~~Motlop~~	~~Simpson~~	Cowan	~~Gillies~~	Hawkins	Byrnes	Hawkins	Hogan
Coach:	Chris Scott			Chris Scott			Chris Scott			Chris Scott
▲ In:	Wojcinski			Brown, Byrnes, Christensen, Hawkins, Motlop, Simpson (late changes)			Bartel, J. Hunt, Kelly, Ottens, Stokes, Vardy			Corey, T. Hunt, Varcoe
▼ Out:	Selwood			Bartel, J. Hunt, Milburn, Stokes, Vardy, Kelly, Ottens (late changes)			Byrnes, Gillies, Hawkins, T. Hunt, Simpson, Varcoe, Corey (late change)			Brown, Gillies, Mackie

Geelong's 2011 teams (Rounds 17 to 20)

Geelong's Round 17 team				Geelong's Round 18 team			Geelong's Round 19 team			Geelong's Round 20 team
B:	T. Hunt	J. Hunt	Lonergan	J. Hunt	Scarlett	Lonergan	Lonergan	Scarlett	Milburn	J. Hunt	Scarlett	Wojcinski
HB:	Mackie	Taylor	Enright	Enright	Taylor	Mackie	Enright	Taylor (substituted off)	Mackie	Kelly	Taylor	Milburn
C:	Corey	Selwood	Bartel	Bartel	Selwood	Wojcinski	Kelly	Bartel	Ling	Stokes	Bartel	Duncan
HF:	Stokes	Hawkins	Chapman	Stokes	Hawkins	Varcoe	Varcoe	Hawkins	Duncan	Chapman	Mooney	S. Johnson
F:	Varcoe	Podsiadly	S. Johnson	Byrnes (substituted off)	Podsiadly	Christensen	S. Johnson	Mooney	West	Hawkins	Podsiadly	Varcoe
Foll:	West	Ling	Kelly	West	Chapman	Corey	Ottens	Chapman	Selwood	West	Corey (substituted off)	Ling
Int:	Christensen	Hogan (substituted off)	Vardy	Duncan	Kelly	Milburn	Corey	Stokes	Wojcinski	Christensen	Mackie	Selwood
Sub:	Motlop (substituted on) 3rd'			Cowan (substituted on) Half-time'			Christensen (substituted on) 3rd'			Lonergan (substituted on) Half-time'
Emg:	Byrnes	Milburn	~~West~~	T. Hunt	Menzel	~~Milburn~~	Cowan	Guthrie	Motlop	Gillies	Guthrie	Vardy
Coach:	Chris Scott			Chris Scott			Chris Scott			Chris Scott
▲ In:	Hawkins, Hogan, Mackie, Selwood, West (late change)			Byrnes, Cowan, Duncan, Scarlett, Wojcinski, Milburn (late change)			S. Johnson, Ling, Mooney, Ottens			J. Hunt, Podsiadly
▼ Out:	Duncan, Menzel, Ottens, Wojcinski, Scarlett (late change)			Hogan, T. Hunt, Ling, Motlop, Vardy, S. Johnson (late change)			Byrnes, Cowan, J. Hunt, Podsiadly			Enright, Ottens

Geelong's 2011 teams (Rounds 21 to 24)

Geelong's Round 21 team				Geelong's Round 22 team	Geelong's Round 23 team			Geelong's Round 24 team
B:	J. Hunt	Lonergan	Enright	Bye	J. Hunt	Scarlett	Lonergan	Milburn	Scarlett	J. Hunt
HB:	Menzel	Taylor	Corey	Bye	Enright	Taylor (substituted off)	Wojcinski	Mackie	Taylor (substituted off)	Enright
C:	Varcoe	Bartel	Ling	Bye	Bartel	Ling	Stokes	Duncan	Ling	Bartel
HF:	Stokes	Mooney	S. Johnson	Bye	S. Johnson	Hawkins	Varcoe	Varcoe	West	S. Johnson
F:	Vardy	Podsiadly	Duncan (substituted off)	Bye	West	Podsiadly	Menzel	Hawkins	Podsiadly	Chapman
Foll:	Ottens	Selwood	Kelly	Bye	Ottens	Kelly	Chapman	Ottens	Kelly	Selwood
Int:	Chapman	Christensen	Wojcinski	Bye	Byrnes	Mackie	Selwood	Christensen	Menzel	Wojcinski
Sub:	Byrnes (substituted on) 3rd'			Bye	Christensen (substituted on) 2nd'			Byrnes (substituted on) 3rd'
Emg:	~~Byrnes~~	Motlop	West	Bye	Duncan	Hunt	Simpson	~~Byrnes~~	Guthrie	Motlop
Coach:	Chris Scott			Bye	Chris Scott			Chris Scott
▲ In:	Enright, Menzel, Ottens, Vardy, Byrnes (late change)			Bye	Hawkins, Mackie, Scarlett, West			Duncan, Milburn
▼ Out:	Hawkins, Milburn, Scarlett, West, Mackie (late change)			Bye	Corey, Duncan, Mooney, Vardy			Lonergan, Stokes (late change)

Geelong's 2011 teams (Finals)

Geelong's Qualifying Final team				Geelong's Preliminary Final team			Geelong's Grand Final team
B:	J. Hunt	Scarlett	Lonergan	J. Hunt	Scarlett	Lonergan	Lonergan	Scarlett	J. Hunt
HB:	Enright	Taylor	Mackie	Enright	Taylor	Wojcinski	Wojcinski	Taylor	Enright
C:	Bartel	Kelly	Duncan	Bartel	Mackie	Selwood	Mackie	Bartel	Selwood
HF:	S. Johnson	Ling	Varcoe	Corey	Hawkins	S. Johnson (substituted off)	Varcoe	Hawkins	S. Johnson
F:	Hawkins	Podsiadly	West	Stokes	Podsiadly	Varcoe	Chapman	Podsiadly (substituted off)	Kelly
Foll:	Ottens	Chapman	Selwood	West	Ling	Chapman	Ottens	Ling	Corey
Int:	Christensen	Menzel (substituted off)	Wojcinski	Christensen	Kelly	Ottens	Christensen	Stokes	West
Sub:	Stokes (substituted on) 2nd'			Duncan (substituted on) 3rd'			Duncan (substituted on) 2nd'
Emg:	Milburn	Mooney	Motlop	Byrnes	Milburn	Mooney	Byrnes	Guthrie	Milburn
Coach:	Chris Scott			Chris Scott			Chris Scott
▲ In:	Lonergan, Stokes			Corey			No change
▼ Out:	Byrnes, Milburn			Menzel			No change

== Awards and records ==
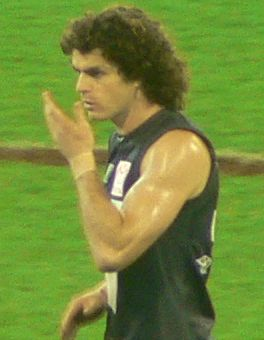
All-Australian team member Matthew Scarlett celebrated his 250th match for Geelong in 2011.

Milestones

Player	Milestone	Round
Corey Enright	200 games	Round 1
Cameron Guthrie	AFL debut	Round 1
Paul Chapman	200 games	Round 2
Allen Christensen	AFL debut	Round 2
Josh Hunt	150 games	Round 4
Brad Ottens	100 games (for Geelong)	Round 4
Matthew Scarlett	250 games	Round 5
Joel Selwood	100 games	Round 8
Nathan Vardy	AFL debut	Round 9
Josh Cowan	AFL debut	Round 10
Mathew Stokes	100 games	Round 13
Shannon Byrnes	100 games	Round 14
Mitch Brown	AFL debut	Round 14
Jimmy Bartel	200 games	Round 21
Andrew Mackie	150 games	Grand Final
Travis Varcoe	100 games	Grand Final

AFL awards

Award	Recipient	Awarded by
Member of the 2011 All-Australian team (back pocket)	Corey Enright	AFL
Member of the 2011 All-Australian team (interchange)	James Kelly	AFL
Member of the 2011 All-Australian team (back pocket)	Matthew Scarlett	AFL

Records

- ~~Best result from 100 consecutive matches – 85 wins, 15 losses (Round 5, 2007 – Round 4, 2011)~~
- Best result from 100 consecutive matches – 86 wins, 14 losses (Round 6, 2007 – Round 5, 2011)
- ~~Most consecutive wins at one venue (Skilled Stadium) – 25 wins (Round 3, 2008 – Round 7, 2011)~~
- ~~Most consecutive wins at one venue (Skilled Stadium) – 26 wins (Round 3, 2008 – Round 11, 2011)~~
- Most consecutive wins at one venue (Skilled Stadium) – 29 wins (Round 3, 2008 – Round 20, 2011)
- ~~Chris Scott – Most consecutive wins without a loss by a first-year coach – 10 wins (equalled; Round 11, 2011)~~
- Most streaks of 10 or more wins in VFL/AFL history – 14 streaks (Round 11, 2011)
- Chris Scott – Most consecutive wins without a loss by a first-year coach – 11 wins (Round 12, 2011)
- Most consecutive wins against a club who were victors in the last Grand Final played between the two clubs – six wins against Hawthorn (Round 1, 2009 – Round 12, 2011)
- Steve Johnson – Most score assists (11) in a match (Round 19, 2011)
- Joel Selwood – Most disposals (43) in a match at Kardinia Park (Round 19, 2011)
- First team in VFL/AFL history to win at least 17 regular season games in five consecutive seasons
- Most inside-50s in a match (80) (Round 20, 2011)
- First team to record 100 wins in a five-season span (2007–2011)
- first team to win consecutive games by 150 points or more.
- The consecutive wins in rounds 19 and 20, with a combined margin of 336 points, was the highest combined margin in consecutive wins of all time.
- In Round 19 against Melbourne:
  - Geelong's final score of 37.11 (233) was the second-highest ever scored by Geelong, the second-highest score ever conceded by Melbourne, the highest score ever at Skilled Stadium, the fourth-highest score of all time, and the highest score by any team since quarters were shortened to 20 minutes in 1994.
  - Geelong's final winning margin of 186 points was Geelong's highest ever, the highest ever at Skilled Stadium, the second-highest ever conceded by Melbourne, the second-highest of all time, and the largest since quarters were shortened to 20 minutes in 1994.
  - Geelong's second quarter score of 12.1 (73) was the highest ever by Geelong, and the equal-highest ever conceded by Melbourne.
  - Geelong's leading margin at half-time of 114 points was the second-highest of all-time (the highest, 120 points, occurred in Round 8, 1993).
  - Geelong's half-time score of 20.4 (124) was the second-highest in Geelong's history, and the highest ever conceded by Melbourne.
  - Geelong's score of 37.11 featured 26 more goals than behinds, a new VFL/AFL record (the previous record of 23 was set by Geelong in Round 6, 2007).
  - Geelong recorded 510 disposals through the game, a new record.
  - Geelong became the first team to score more than fifty points in each of the four-quarters of a match.

Other

- Jimmy Bartel – 2011 AFL Goal of the Year (Round 1 nomination)
- Jimmy Bartel – 2011 AFL Mark of the Year (Round 3 nomination)
- Mitch Duncan – 2011 AFL Rising Star (Round 3 nomination)
- Steve Johnson – 2011 AFL Mark of the Year (Round 4 nomination)
- Daniel Menzel – 2011 AFL Goal of the Year (Round 4 nomination)
- The seventh-round match against North Melbourne marks the first time that twin brothers were opposing coaches, with Chris Scott (Geelong) coaching against Brad Scott. It was also only the third time in which brothers have coached against one another at VFL/AFL level.
- James Podsiadly – 2011 AFL Mark of the Year (Round 8 nomination)
- Nathan Vardy – 2011 AFL Mark of the Year (Round 11 nomination)
- Daniel Menzel – 2011 AFL Rising Star (Round 13 nomination)
- Steve Johnson – 2011 AFL Goal of the Year (Round 15 nomination)
- Allen Christensen – 2011 AFL Rising Star (Round 18 nomination)
- Shannon Byrnes – 2011 AFL Mark of the Year (Round 23 nomination)
- David Wojcinski – 2011 AFL Mark of the Year (Round 24 nomination)

== Season statistics ==
Category	Club leader(s)	Total	Ref
Leading goalkicker	James Podsiadly	52	
Most disposals	James Kelly	577	
Most kicks	Corey Enright	330	
Most handballs	Joel Corey	262	
Most marks	Corey Enright, Harry Taylor	144	
Most hit-outs	Brad Ottens	500	
Most clearances	Joel Selwood	109	
Most contested possessions	Joel Selwood	253	
Most uncontested possessions	Corey Enright	350	

== Tribunal cases ==
Updated as of Round 13, 2011 season

Match Review Panel (MRP) and AFL Tribunal cases involving Geelong players during the 2011 AFL season
Round	Player	Charge category (level)	Victim (club)	Verdict	Sanction	Points^{[b]}	Ref
1	Jimmy Bartel	Negligent umpire contact	Ray Chamberlain (umpire)	Guilty (early plea)	Fine ($900)	—	
1	Matthew Scarlett	Striking (2)	Nick Riewoldt (St Kilda)	Guilty (early plea)	Suspension (1 match)	54.69	
12	Joel Selwood	Striking (5)	Brent Guerra (Hawthorn)	Guilty (lost at tribunal)	Suspension (4 matches)	25.00	
13	Joel Corey	Rough conduct (1)	Jack Steven (St Kilda)	Guilty (early plea)	Reprimand	93.75	
13	Josh Hunt	Striking (2)	Adam Schneider (St Kilda)	Guilty (early plea)	Suspension (1 match)	54.69	
13	Mathew Stokes	Striking (3)	Justin Koschitzke (St Kilda)	Guilty (early plea)	Suspension (1 match)	85.63	

== VFL season ==
=== Squad ===
The 2011 VFL squad was named on 17 March 2011, consisting of 17 players. An additional four players were able to be listed until 30 June 2011, however, Geelong did not utilise these places. Senior and rookie-listed players for Geelong are also eligible for selection in VFL matches.

- Isaac Baker
- Jaxson Barham
- Anthony Biemans
- Mark Corrigan
- Mitchell Cuthill
- Anthony Elliott
- Matthew Firman
- Mitch Fisher
- Jack Hollmer
- Tommy Maas
- Andrew McLean
- Garreth Phillips
- Ben Raidme
- Troy Selwood
- Jack Shannahan
- Jackson Sheringham
- Casey Tutungi

=== Results ===
**Round**	**Date and local time**	**Opponent**	**Scores** (Geelong's scores indicated in **bold**)			**Venue**	**Ladder** **position**
**Round**	**Date and local time**	**Opponent**	Home	Away	Result	**Venue**	**Ladder** **position**
1	Saturday, 2 April (7:00 pm)	Casey Scorpions	13.14 (92)	**9.11 (65)**	Lost by 27 points	Casey Fields **[A]**	9th
2	Sunday, 10 April (10:40 am)	Werribee	**6.10 (46)**	9.20 (74)	Lost by 28 points	Skilled Stadium **[H]**	12th
3	Bye						11th
4	Sunday, 24 April (2:00 pm)	Williamstown	19.20 (134)	**15.12 (102)**	Lost by 32 points	Torquay Football Ground **[A]**	12th
5	Sunday, 1 May (2:00 pm)	Sandringham	18.14 (122)	**13.13 (91)**	Lost by 31 points	Trevor Barker Beach Oval **[A]**	11th
6	Saturday, 7 May (10:40 am)	North Ballarat	**10.9 (69)**	17.12 (114)	Lost by 45 points	Skilled Stadium **[H]**	12th
7	Saturday, 14 May (1:00 pm)	Collingwood	10.15 (75)	**10.11 (71)**	Lost by 4 points	Victoria Park **[A]**	11th
8	Bye						12th
9	Saturday, 28 May (11:15 am)	Bendigo Bombers	**13.12 (90)**	20.12 (132)	Lost by 42 points	Skilled Stadium **[H]**	13th
10	Saturday, 4 June (2:00 pm)	Box Hill Hawks	12.9 (81)	**11.16 (82)**	Won by 1 point	Box Hill City Oval **[A]**	12th
11	Sunday, 12 June (2:00 pm)	Werribee	15.13 (103)	**12.20 (92)**	Lost by 9 points	Avalon Airport Oval **[A]**	11th
12	Saturday, 18 June (1:10 pm)	Northern Bullants	**15.7 (97)**	15.12 (102)	Lost by 5 points	Skilled Stadium **[H]**	12th
13	Saturday, 25 June (1:10 pm)	Port Melbourne	19.9 (123)	**12.10 (82)**	Lost by 41 points	TEAC Oval **[A]**	12th
14	Saturday, 2 July (1:00 pm)	Frankston	**24.18 (162)**	11.3 (69)	Won by 93 points	Skilled Stadium **[H]**	11th
15	Bye						12th
16	Saturday, 16 July (1:10 pm)	Coburg Tigers	**15.9 (99)**	12.12 (84)	Won by 15 points	Skilled Stadium **[H]**	10th
17	Saturday, 24 July (2:00 pm)	Bendigo Bombers	17.12 (114)	**11.18 (84)**	Lost by 20 points	Queen Elizabeth Oval **[A]**	10th
18	Saturday, 30 July (10:40 am)	Casey Scorpions	**31.6 (192)**	10.4 (64)	Won by 128 points	Skilled Stadium **[H]**	10th
19	Saturday, 6 August (10:10 am)^{[a]}	Collingwood	**17.18 (120)**	12.9 (81)	Won by 39 points	Skilled Stadium **[H]**	9th
20	Saturday, 13 August (2:00 pm)	Northern Bullants	13.23 (101)	**14.7 (91)**	Lost by 10 points	Visy Park **[A]**	9th
21	Bye						10th
22	Saturday, 27 August (10:40 am)	Sandringham	**19.10 (124)**	18.12 (120)	Won by 4 points	Skilled Stadium **[H]**	9th

== Notes ==
Key

- H Home match.
- A Away match.

General notes

- ^{a} The Geelong-Gold Coast match at Skilled Stadium on 6 August was rescheduled from 2:10 pm to 1:40 pm in response to poor light at the previous weeks' game at the stadium. Consequently, the preceding VFL match was also rescheduled from 10:40 am to 10:10 am
- ^{b} "Points" refers to carry-over points accrued following the sanction. For example, 154.69 points draw a one-match suspension, with 54.69 carry-over points (for every 100 points, a one-match suspension is given).
