= 2013 Geelong Football Club season =

Geelong Football Club
2013 season
- President: Colin Carter
- Coach: Chris Scott (3rd season)
- Captains: Joel Selwood (2nd season)
- Home ground: Simonds Stadium
- Pre-season competition: 3rd
- AFL season: 2nd
- Finals series: Preliminary finals
- Leading goalkicker: Tom Hawkins (49)
- Highest home attendance: 85,197 vs. Hawthorn (Round 15)
- Lowest home attendance: 23,172 vs. Melbourne (Round 16)
- Average home attendance: 36,650
- Club membership: 42,884

The 2013 Geelong Football Club season was the club's 114th season of senior competition in the Australian Football League (AFL). The club also fielded its reserves team in the Victorian Football League (VFL) for the 14th season.

== Club personnel ==
=== Playing list ===
Players are listed in alphabetical order by surname, and statistics are for AFL regular season and finals series matches during the 2013 AFL season only.

| ^ | Denotes player who is on the club's rookie list. |
| # | Denotes nominated rookie where player has been elevated to club's senior list during season, and therefore eligible for senior selection. |

Geelong's 2013 playing list and statistics
| Player | # | AFL debut | Games | Goals | Behinds | Kicks | Handballs | Disposals | Marks | Tackles |
|---|---|---|---|---|---|---|---|---|---|---|
| Jimmy Bartel | 3 | 2002 | 24 | 16 | 9 | 354 | 204 | 558 | 129 | 84 |
| Ryan Bathie^ | 42 | —N/a | 0 | 0 | 0 | 0 | 0 | 0 | 0 | 0 |
| Jed Bews | 24 | —N/a | 0 | 0 | 0 | 0 | 0 | 0 | 0 | 0 |
| Mark Blicavs# | 46 | 2013 | 22 | 7 | 8 | 96 | 143 | 239 | 63 | 69 |
| Mitch Brown | 1 | 2011 | 5 | 0 | 2 | 37 | 21 | 58 | 22 | 4 |
| George Burbury# | 43 | 2013 | 2 | 2 | 2 | 10 | 12 | 22 | 3 | 9 |
| Josh Caddy | 23 | 2011 | 18 | 11 | 13 | 150 | 118 | 268 | 51 | 53 |
| Paul Chapman | 35 | 2000 | 8 | 12 | 7 | 91 | 71 | 162 | 27 | 34 |
| Allen Christensen | 28 | 2011 | 21 | 23 | 14 | 212 | 231 | 443 | 68 | 85 |
| Joel Corey | 11 | 2000 | 22 | 5 | 3 | 170 | 288 | 458 | 72 | 103 |
| Josh Cowan | 18 | 2011 | 0 | 0 | 0 | 0 | 0 | 0 | 0 | 0 |
| Mitch Duncan | 22 | 2010 | 25 | 14 | 16 | 310 | 216 | 526 | 161 | 72 |
| Cameron Eardley^ | 37 | —N/a | 0 | 0 | 0 | 0 | 0 | 0 | 0 | 0 |
| Corey Enright | 44 | 2001 | 22 | 1 | 4 | 324 | 166 | 490 | 152 | 41 |
| Cameron Guthrie | 29 | 2011 | 20 | 5 | 2 | 143 | 114 | 257 | 75 | 55 |
| Joel Hamling | 45 | —N/a | 0 | 0 | 0 | 0 | 0 | 0 | 0 | 0 |
| Brad Hartman | 36 | —N/a | 0 | 0 | 0 | 0 | 0 | 0 | 0 | 0 |
| Tom Hawkins | 26 | 2007 | 22 | 49 | 20 | 141 | 74 | 215 | 93 | 22 |
| George Horlin-Smith | 33 | 2012 | 8 | 3 | 2 | 51 | 67 | 118 | 23 | 18 |
| Josh Hunt | 8 | 2001 | 12 | 3 | 1 | 105 | 67 | 172 | 54 | 18 |
| Taylor Hunt | 19 | 2010 | 15 | 6 | 3 | 98 | 96 | 194 | 37 | 43 |
| Steve Johnson | 20 | 2002 | 19 | 23 | 23 | 315 | 231 | 546 | 108 | 87 |
| James Kelly | 9 | 2002 | 20 | 10 | 12 | 234 | 202 | 436 | 50 | 153 |
| Shane Kersten | 39 | —N/a | 0 | 0 | 0 | 0 | 0 | 0 | 0 | 0 |
| Tom Lonergan | 13 | 2005 | 25 | 4 | 3 | 104 | 106 | 210 | 85 | 47 |
| Andrew Mackie | 4 | 2004 | 25 | 5 | 6 | 357 | 162 | 519 | 156 | 43 |
| Lincoln McCarthy | 6 | 2012 | 0 | 0 | 0 | 0 | 0 | 0 | 0 | 0 |
| Hamish McIntosh | 17 | 2005 | 0 | 0 | 0 | 0 | 0 | 0 | 0 | 0 |
| Daniel Menzel | 10 | 2010 | 0 | 0 | 0 | 0 | 0 | 0 | 0 | 0 |
| Steven Motlop | 32 | 2010 | 24 | 44 | 25 | 282 | 146 | 428 | 78 | 45 |
| Jordan Murdoch | 21 | 2012 | 11 | 11 | 6 | 55 | 37 | 92 | 23 | 44 |
| James Podsiadly | 31 | 2010 | 23 | 33 | 18 | 218 | 102 | 320 | 135 | 52 |
| Jared Rivers | 25 | 2003 | 10 | 0 | 2 | 50 | 53 | 103 | 26 | 24 |
| Jordan Schroder | 15 | 2012 | 4 | 3 | 4 | 14 | 21 | 35 | 6 | 11 |
| Joel Selwood | 14 | 2007 | 25 | 30 | 16 | 307 | 308 | 615 | 102 | 140 |
| Jackson Sheringham^ | 38 | 2012 | 0 | 0 | 0 | 0 | 0 | 0 | 0 | 0 |
| Dawson Simpson | 16 | 2010 | 6 | 1 | 1 | 22 | 37 | 59 | 21 | 12 |
| Billie Smedts | 2 | 2012 | 13 | 12 | 8 | 75 | 65 | 140 | 40 | 40 |
| Mathew Stokes | 27 | 2006 | 24 | 12 | 6 | 285 | 348 | 633 | 123 | 65 |
| Jesse Stringer | 41 | 2012 | 7 | 3 | 2 | 36 | 31 | 67 | 13 | 31 |
| Harry Taylor | 7 | 2008 | 24 | 15 | 9 | 266 | 135 | 401 | 176 | 36 |
| Jackson Thurlow | 40 | 2013 | 4 | 1 | 1 | 31 | 29 | 60 | 15 | 9 |
| Travis Varcoe | 5 | 2007 | 14 | 8 | 6 | 74 | 95 | 169 | 25 | 59 |
| Nathan Vardy | 30 | 2011 | 10 | 11 | 2 | 45 | 43 | 88 | 29 | 19 |
| Josh Walker# | 34 | 2012 | 3 | 2 | 1 | 14 | 11 | 25 | 8 | 11 |
| Trent West | 12 | 2008 | 13 | 5 | 3 | 76 | 51 | 127 | 23 | 12 |

== Season summary ==
=== Pre-season matches ===
Geelong's 2013 NAB Cup fixture (Week 1 – Lightning matches)
| Round | Date and local time | Opponent | Scores^{[a]} | | | Venue | Attendance | Ladder position | Ref |
| Round | Date and local time | Opponent | Home | Away | Result | Venue | Attendance | Ladder position | Ref |
|---|---|---|---|---|---|---|---|---|---|
| 1 | Saturday, 16 February (4:40 pm) | West Coast | 1.6.2 (47) | 1.6.4 (49) | Won by 2 points | Patersons Stadium [A] | 20,485 | 12th | |
| 1 | Saturday, 16 February (5:45 pm) | Fremantle | 0.7.6 (48) | 0.4.6 (30) | Lost by 18 points | Patersons Stadium [A] | 21,804 | 12th | |

Geelong's 2013 NAB Cup fixture (Weeks 2, 3 & 4 – Full-length matches)
| Round | Date and local time | Opponent | Scores^{[a]} | | | Venue | Attendance | Ladder position | Ref |
| Round | Date and local time | Opponent | Home | Away | Result | Venue | Attendance | Ladder position | Ref |
|---|---|---|---|---|---|---|---|---|---|
| 2 | Saturday, 2 March (2:40 pm) | Adelaide | 2.16.12 (126) | 1.8.6 (63) | Won by 63 points | Simonds Stadium [H] | Unknown | 5th | |
| 3 | Saturday, 9 March (3:40 pm) | North Melbourne | 0.14.12 (96) | 0.12.12 (84) | Won by 12 points | Simonds Stadium [H] | Unknown | 3rd | |
| 4 | Friday, 15 March (4:00 pm) | Collingwood | 20.21 (141) | 13.12 (90) | Won by 51 points | Simonds Stadium [H] | Unknown | —N/a | |

=== Regular season ===
Geelong's 2013 AFL season fixture
| Round | Date and local time | Opponent | Home | Away | Result | Venue | Attendance | Ladder position | Ref |
| Round | Date and local time | Opponent | Scores^{[a]} | | | Venue | Attendance | Ladder position | Ref |
|---|---|---|---|---|---|---|---|---|---|
| 1 | Monday, 1 April (3:15 pm) | Hawthorn | 12.14 (86) | 13.15 (93) | Won by 7 points | MCG [A] | 76,300 | 8th | |
| 2 | Sunday, 7 April (1:10 pm) | North Melbourne | 16.16 (112) | 17.6 (108) | Won by 4 points | Etihad Stadium [H] | 34,152 | 7th | |
| 3 | Saturday, 13 April (7:40 pm) | Carlton | 18.11 (119) | 15.13 (103) | Won by 16 points | Etihad Stadium [H] | 43,241 | 5th | |
| 4 | Friday, 19 April (7:50 pm) | Sydney | 16.7 (103) | 19.10 (124) | Won by 21 points | SCG [A] | 31,060 | 3rd | |
| 5 | Saturday, 27 April (7:40 pm) | Western Bulldogs | 13.8 (86) | 15.17 (107) | Won by 21 points | Etihad Stadium [A] | 26,153 | 3rd | |
| 6 | Saturday, 4 May (7:40 pm) | Richmond | 13.9 (87) | 20.11 (131) | Won by 44 points | MCG [A] | 55,625 | 2nd | |
| 7 | Friday, 10 May (7:50 pm) | Essendon | 17.11 (113) | 11.19 (85) | Won by 28 points | Etihad Stadium [H] | 53,014 | 1st | |
| 8 | Saturday, 18 May (7:40 pm) | Collingwood | 15.12 (102) | 14.12 (96) | Lost by 6 points | MCG [A] | 66,768 | 2nd | |
| 9 | Saturday, 25 May (1:15 pm) | Port Adelaide | 9.14 (68) | 18.8 (116) | Won by 48 points | AAMI Stadium [A] | 21,309 | 2nd | |
| 10 | Saturday, 1 June (7:40 pm) | Gold Coast | 18.15 (123) | 10.11 (71) | Won by 52 points | Simonds Stadium [H] | 30,082 | 2nd | |
| 11 | Saturday, 8 June (1:40 pm) | Greater Western Sydney | 15.8 (98) | 24.13 (157) | Won by 59 points | Skoda Stadium [A] | 7,809 | 1st | |
| 12 | Bye | | | | | | | 2nd | |
| 13 | Sunday, 23 June (4:40 pm) | Brisbane Lions | 15.13 (103) | 14.14 (98) | Lost by 5 points | The Gabba [A] | 24,164 | 2nd | |
| 14 | Saturday, 29 June (7:40 pm) | Fremantle | 11.19 (85) | 7.2 (44) | Won by 41 points | Simonds Stadium [H] | 26,743 | 2nd | |
| 15 | Saturday, 6 July (7:40 pm) | Hawthorn | 11.16 (82) | 10.12 (72) | Won by 10 points | MCG [H] | 85,197 | 2nd | |
| 16 | Saturday, 13 July (2:10 pm) | Melbourne | 13.20 (98) | 4.6 (30) | Won by 68 points | Simonds Stadium [H] | 23,172 | 2nd | |
| 17 | Sunday, 21 July (2:45 pm) | Adelaide | 14.10 (94) | 14.8 (92) | Lost by 2 points | AAMI Stadium [A] | 28,603 | 3rd | |
| 18 | Saturday, 27 July (7:40 pm) | St Kilda | 21.11 (137) | 5.6 (36) | Won by 101 points | Simonds Stadium [H] | 27,200 | 2nd | |
| 19 | Friday, 2 August (7:50 pm) | North Melbourne | 15.6 (96) | 13.8 (86) | Lost by 10 points | Etihad Stadium [A] | 33,584 | 3rd | |
| 20 | Saturday, 10 August (2:10 pm) | Port Adelaide | 20.9 (129) | 16.8 (104) | Won by 25 points | Simonds Stadium [H] | 24,784 | 2nd | |
| 21 | Saturday, 17 August (5:40 pm) | West Coast | 6.5 (41) | 16.11 (107) | Won by 66 points | Patersons Stadium [A] | 34,394 | 2nd | |
| 22 | Saturday, 24 August (4:40 pm) | Sydney | 13.14 (92) | 7.6 (48) | Won by 44 points | Simonds Stadium [H] | 28,459 | 2nd | |
| 23 | Saturday, 31 August (2:10 pm) | Brisbane Lions | 15.22 (112) | 17.9 (111) | Won by 1 point | Simonds Stadium [H] | 27,467 | 2nd | |

==== Ladder ====
2013 AFL ladder
| Pos | Team | Pld | W | L | D | PF | PA | PP | Pts | |
|---|---|---|---|---|---|---|---|---|---|---|
| 1 | Hawthorn (P) | 22 | 19 | 3 | 0 | 2523 | 1859 | 135.7 | 76 | Finals series |
| 2 | Geelong | 22 | 18 | 4 | 0 | 2409 | 1776 | 135.6 | 72 | Finals series |
| 3 | Fremantle | 22 | 16 | 5 | 1 | 2035 | 1518 | 134.1 | 66 | Finals series |
| 4 | Sydney | 22 | 15 | 6 | 1 | 2244 | 1694 | 132.5 | 62 | Finals series |
| 5 | Richmond | 22 | 15 | 7 | 0 | 2154 | 1754 | 122.8 | 60 | Finals series |
| 6 | Collingwood | 22 | 14 | 8 | 0 | 2148 | 1868 | 115.0 | 56 | Finals series |
| 7 | Port Adelaide | 22 | 12 | 10 | 0 | 2051 | 2002 | 102.4 | 48 | Finals series |
| 8 | Carlton | 22 | 11 | 11 | 0 | 2125 | 1992 | 106.7 | 44 | Finals series |
| 9 | Essendon | 22 | 14 | 8 | 0 | 2145 | 2000 | 107.3 | 56 (Note: Essendon was relegated to ninth due to irregularities in its supplements program during the 2012 season.) | |
| 10 | North Melbourne | 22 | 10 | 12 | 0 | 2307 | 1930 | 119.5 | 40 | |
| 11 | Adelaide | 22 | 10 | 12 | 0 | 2064 | 1909 | 108.1 | 40 | |
| 12 | Brisbane Lions | 22 | 10 | 12 | 0 | 1922 | 2144 | 89.6 | 40 | |
| 13 | West Coast | 22 | 9 | 13 | 0 | 2038 | 2139 | 95.3 | 36 | |
| 14 | Gold Coast | 22 | 8 | 14 | 0 | 1918 | 2091 | 91.7 | 32 | |
| 15 | Western Bulldogs | 22 | 8 | 14 | 0 | 1926 | 2262 | 85.1 | 32 | |
| 16 | St Kilda | 22 | 5 | 17 | 0 | 1751 | 2120 | 82.6 | 20 | |
| 17 | Melbourne | 22 | 2 | 20 | 0 | 1455 | 2691 | 54.1 | 8 | |
| 18 | Greater Western Sydney | 22 | 1 | 21 | 0 | 1524 | 2990 | 51.0 | 4 | |

Source: AFL Tables
Rules for classification: 1) points; 2) percentage; 3) number of points for.
(P) Premiers

=== Finals series ===
Geelong's 2013 AFL finals series matches
| Round | Date and local time | Opponent | Scores^{[c]} | | | Venue | Attendance | Ref |
| Round | Date and local time | Opponent | Home | Away | Result | Venue | Attendance | Ref |
|---|---|---|---|---|---|---|---|---|
| Second Qualifying Final | Saturday, 7 September (2:20 pm) | Fremantle | 9.18 (72) | 12.15 (87) | Lost by 15 points | Simonds Stadium [H] | 32,815 | |
| Second Semi-Final | Friday, 13 September (7:50 pm) | Port Adelaide | 13.18 (96) | 12.8 (80) | Won by 16 points | MCG [H] | 52,744 | |
| First Preliminary Final | Friday, 20 September (7:50 pm) | Hawthorn | 14.18 (102) | 15.7 (97) | Lost by 5 points | MCG [A] | 85,569 | |
As a result of Geelong's loss in the preliminary final the club was eliminated from the 2013 AFL finals series

== Awards, Records & Milestones ==
Milestones

- Round 1 - Josh Caddy (Geelong debut)
- Round 1 - Jared Rivers (Geelong debut)
- Round 1 - Mark Blicavs (AFL debut)
- Round 3 - Tom Lonergan (100 games)
- Round 6 - Corey Enright (250 games)
- Round 6 - Steve Johnson (200 games)
- Round 7 - Jackson Thurlow (AFL debut)
- Round 9 - Trent West (50 games)
- Round 9 - George Burbury (AFL debut)
- Round 16 - Joel Selwood (150 games)

AFL Awards

| Award | Recipient |
|---|---|
| Captain of the 2013 All-Australian team (Centre); AFLPA Award for Best Captain; AFLPA Robert Rose Award for Most Courageous Player | Joel Selwood |
| Member of the 2013 All-Australian team (Back pocket) | Corey Enright |
| Member of the 2013 All-Australian team (Centre half-back) | Harry Taylor |
| Member of the 2013 All-Australian team (Interchange) | Andrew Mackie |

== VFL season ==
=== Results ===
Geelong's VFL practice matches
| Week | Date and local time | Opponent | Scores^{[c]} | | | Venue | Ref |
| Week | Date and local time | Opponent | Home | Away | Result | Venue | Ref |
|---|---|---|---|---|---|---|---|
| 1 | | | | | | | |

Geelong's 2013 VFL season fixture
| Round | Date and local time | Opponent | Home | Away | Result | Venue | Ladder position | Ref |
| Round | Date and local time | Opponent | Scores^{[c]} | | | Venue | Ladder position | Ref |
|---|---|---|---|---|---|---|---|---|
| 1 | Sunday, 31 March (2:00 pm) | Williamstown | 12.16 (88) | 11.14 (80) | Won by 8 points | Torquay Football Ground [H] | 6th | |
| 2 | Sunday, 14 April (1:00 pm) | Sandringham | 15.21 (111) | 12.7 (79) | Won by 32 points | Simonds Stadium [H] | 3rd | |
| 3 | Saturday, 20 April (1:10 pm) | Box Hill | 12.17 (89) | 12.12 (84) | Won by 5 points | Simonds Stadium [H] | 3rd | |
| 4 | Sunday, 28 April (2:00 pm) | Frankston | 7.10 (52) | 19.17 (131) | Won by 79 points | Frankston Oval [A] | 2nd | |
| 5 | Saturday, 4 May (11:00 am) | Werribee | 21.14 (140) | 12.13 (85) | Won by 55 points | Simonds Stadium [H] | 1st | |
| 6 | Saturday, 18 May (1:00 pm) | Collingwood | 18.12 (120) | 16.11 (107) | Lost by 13 points | Victoria Park [A] | 1st | |
| 7 | Sunday, 26 May (1:00 pm) | Casey | 16.11 (107) | 18.12 (120) | Lost by 13 points | Simonds Stadium [H] | 4th | |
| 8 | Saturday, 1 June (1:00 pm) | Essendon | 13.10 (88) | 18.18 (126) | Won by 38 points | Windy Hill [A] | 4th | |
| 9 | Sunday, 9 June (1:00 pm) | Northern Blues | 15.13 (103) | 5.15 (45) | Won by 58 points | Simonds Stadium [H] | 2nd | |
| 10 | Bye | | | | | | 3rd | |
| 11 | Saturday, 22 June (1:10 pm) | Port Melbourne | 21.17 (143) | 9.4 (58) | Won by 85 points | Simonds Stadium [H] | 2nd | |
| 12 | Sunday, 30 June (2:00 pm) | Coburg | 14.11 (95) | 16.19 (115) | Won by 20 points | Coburg City Oval [A] | 2nd | |
| 13 | Saturday, 6 July (11:00 am) | Northern Blues | 18.19 (127) | 7.11 (53) | Won by 74 points | Simonds Stadium [H] | 1st | |
| 14 | Friday, 19 July (7:00 pm) | Collingwood | 17.15 (117) | 10.14 (74) | Won by 43 points | Simonds Stadium [H] | 1st | |
| 15 | Sunday, 28 July (2:00 pm) | Sandringham | 9.9 (63) | 27.18 (180) | Won by 117 points | Trevor Barker Beach Oval [A] | 1st | |
| 16 | Sunday, 4 August (2:00 pm) | Casey | 8.11 (59) | 19.11 (125) | Won by 66 points | Casey Fields [A] | 1st | |
| 17 | Sunday, 11 August (2:00 pm) | Williamstown | 13.8 (86) | 19.21 (135) | Won by 49 points | Burbank Oval [A] | 1st | |
| 18 | Saturday, 17 August (1:10 pm) | Port Melbourne | 15.12 (102) | 14.12 (96) | Won by 6 points | North Port Oval [A] | 1st | |
| 19 | Friday, 23 August (6:30 pm) | Bendigo | 3.8 (26) | 35.17 (227) | Won by 201 points | Queen Elizabeth Oval [A] | 1st | |

Geelong's 2013 VFL finals series matches
| Round | Date and local time | Opponent | Scores^{[c]} | | | Venue | Ref |
| Round | Date and local time | Opponent | Home | Away | Result | Venue | Ref |
|---|---|---|---|---|---|---|---|
| First Qualifying Final | Friday, 30 August (7:00 pm) | Casey Scorpions | 14.16 (100) | 8.3 (51) | Won by 49 points | Simonds Stadium [H] | |
| First Preliminary Final | Saturday, 14 September (2:10 pm) | Williamstown | 24.16 (160) | 11.12 (78) | Won by 82 points | North Port Oval [H] | |
| Grand Final | Sunday, 22 September (2:15 pm) | Box Hill | 14.15 (99) | 11.12 (78) | Lost by 21 points | Etihad Stadium [H] | |
As a result of the club's loss in the VFL Grand Final, Geelong finishing position was runners-up.

== Notes ==
Key

- H Home match.
- A Away match.

Notes

- **^{a}** Geelong's scores are indicated in **bold** font.
