= 2011 AFL Mark of the Year =

- Date: 22 May
- Location: Etihad Stadium
- Winner: Andrew Krakouer (Collingwood)

The Australian Football League celebrates the best mark of the season through the annual Mark of the Year competition. In 2011, this was officially known as the Hungry Jack's AFL Mark of the Year. Each round three marks were nominated and fans voted online for their favourite here . Andrew Krakouer won the fan vote for 2011 Mark of the Year. The AFL itself later recognised that this was not the best mark taken in 2011, when in 2019 it awarded Mark of the Decade to Andrew Walker's Round 18 mark.

== Winners by Round ==
Legend

= Round's Winning Mark

Round	Nominees	Team	% of votes	Opposition	Ground	Description
1	Jude Bolton	Sydney	44%	Melbourne	MCG	One-handed miracle mark
1	Matt Thomas	Port Adelaide	7%	Collingwood	Etihad Stadium	Thomas plucks it from the air
1	David Hille	Essendon	48%	Western Bulldogs	Etihad Stadium	Magnificent fly over the top
2	Scott McMahon	North Melbourne	13%	Collingwood	Etihad Stadium	Soaring effort by McMahon
2	Jackson Trengove	Port Adelaide	18%	West Coast	AAMI Stadium	Big fly by Trengove
2	Mitch Morton	Richmond	69%	St Kilda	MCG	Fantastic, well-timed leap
3	Jimmy Bartel	Geelong	35%	Port Adelaide	Skilled Stadium	Terrific effort by Bartel
3	Mark Jamar	Melbourne	40%	Brisbane Lions	MCG	Great flying grab
3	David Armitage	St Kilda	25%	Essendon	Etihad Stadium	From in front of the pack
4	Jack Riewoldt	Richmond	43%	Collingwood	MCG	Great use of the body by the Tiger superstar
4	Steve Johnson	Geelong	37%	Sydney	SCG	Amidst the rain at the SCG, the super Cat leaps
4	Brett Ebert	Port Adelaide	20%	Adelaide	AAMI Stadium	A great hanger by the small forward in Adelaide
5	Scott Thompson	Adelaide	11%	Carlton	Etihad Stadium	The veteran Crow hangs in the air for a fine mark
5	Andrew Walker	Carlton	80%	Adelaide	Etihad Stadium	Great leap to earn a goal right on half time
5	Chris Dawes	Collingwood	10%	Essendon	MCG	The big Magpie takes a one-hander on Anzac Day
6	Jarred Moore	Sydney	53%	Carlton	SCG	Wet weather can't stop this fine grab.
6	Kurt Tippett	Adelaide	27%	St Kilda	AAMI Stadium	The big Crow leaps between two Saints
6	Lachlan Hansen	North Melbourne	20%	Port Adelaide	Etihad Stadium	Super pack mark from young Kangaroo
7	Drew Petrie	North Melbourne	28%	Geelong	Skilled Stadium	Petrie delivers with a great contested mark
7	Liam Patrick	Gold Coast	32%	Brisbane Lions	The Gabba	Liam leaps high to pull in a special mark
7	Nathan Krakouer	Gold Coast	40%	Brisbane Lions	The Gabba	Great leap over the pack
8	Todd Goldstein	North Melbourne	28%	Melbourne	Etihad Stadium	Spectacular leap from Goldstein
8	James Podsiadly	Geelong	38%	Collingwood	MCG	Pods takes a great mark
8	Rohan Bewick	Brisbane Lions	34%	Essendon	The Gabba	Confident grab from up and over the top
9	Drew Petrie	North Melbourne	17%	Brisbane Lions	The Gabba	Big jump over Maguire's head
9	Leon Davis	Collingwood	6%	Adelaide	Etihad Stadium	Flies over the top to take the grab
9	Andrew Krakouer	Collingwood	77%	Adelaide	Etihad Stadium	Magnificent leap from behind
10	Nathan Fyfe	Fremantle	35%	St Kilda	Patersons Stadium	Fyfe in front of the pack
10	Dale Thomas	Collingwood	40%	West Coast	MCG	Flying grab in front of goal
10	Harry O'Brien	Collingwood	25%	West Coast	MCG	One-handed magic from O'Brien
11	Nathan Vardy	Geelong	29%	Western Bulldogs	Skilled Stadium	Whirling speccy by Vardy
11	Nic Naitanui	West Coast	28%	Gold Coast	Patersons Stadium	Huge hanger over Cox
11	Brendon Goddard	St Kilda	43%	Collingwood	MCG	Goddard soars against the Pies
12	Paddy Ryder	Essendon	10%	Fremantle	Patersons Stadium	Spectacular fly over two Freo opponents
12	Jack Riewoldt	Richmond	32%	Sydney	SCG	Riewoldt's twisting aerial grab
12	Shaun Hampson	Carlton	58%	Brisbane Lions	Etihad Stadium	Aggressive, leaping lead-up mark
13	Drew Petrie	North Melbourne	30%	Essendon	Etihad Stadium	Spectacular one-handed grasp
13	Brad Green	Melbourne	28%	Fremantle	MCG	The captain's bold grab
13	Jay Schulz	Port Adelaide	42%	West Coast	Patersons Stadium	Monster mark over the top
14	Luke McPharlin	Fremantle	33%	Brisbane Lions	Patersons Stadium	Big leap from McPharlin
14	Nic Naitanui	West Coast	65%	Carlton	Etihad Stadium	Massive specky from the Eagles star
14	Jared Brennan	Gold Coast	3%	Western Bulldogs	Gold Coast Stadium	Brennan's flying grab
15	Jack Riewoldt	Richmond	23%	Carlton	MCG	Ripper one-hander
15	Ricky Petterd	Melbourne	61%	Western Bulldogs	Etihad Stadium	Monster hanger on top of opponent Tom Williams
15	Jarrad Grant	Western Bulldogs	15%	Melbourne	Etihad Stadium	Grant's big fly
16	Dale Thomas	Collingwood	24%	North Melbourne	MCG	Thomas flies from behind
16	Heath Hocking	Essendon	56%	Richmond	MCG	Spectacular hanger from the Bombers star
16	Sam Reid	Sydney	20%	Gold Coast	Metricon Stadium	Big leap from Reid
17	James Podsiadly	Geelong	20%	Brisbane Lions	The Gabba	Courageous mark by the J-Pod
17	Dale Thomas	Collingwood	63%	Carlton	MCG	Thomas take a screamer
17	Liam Jurrah	Melbourne	17%	Port Adelaide	TIO Stadium	Jurrah makes it look easy
18	Andrew Walker	Carlton	80%	Essendon	MCG	Walker's huge hanger from atop Carlisle's shoulder
18	Brett Deledio	Richmond	11%	Geelong	Etihad Stadium	Four-touch juggling act
18	Sam Reid	Sydney	8%	Western Bulldogs	SCG	Classic skill from the youngster
19	Jay Schulz	Port Adelaide	20%	Adelaide	AAMI Stadium	Sensational aerial grab
19	Drew Petrie	North Melbourne	25%	Carlton	Etihad Stadium	Petrie's huge hanger
19	Nick Duigan	Carlton	55%	North Melbourne	Etihad Stadium	Duigan's courageous mark
20	Paddy Ryder	Essendon	38%	Sydney	Etihad Stadium	Big leap, spectacular mark
20	Zac Clarke	Fremantle	44%	Carlton	Etihad Stadium	Huge hanger from the tall forward
20	Ricky Petterd	Melbourne	18%	Carlton	MCG	Fantastic flying grab
21	Andrew Walker	Carlton	39%	Fremantle	Patersons Stadium	Another huge hanger from Walker
21	Jeremy Howe	Melbourne	26%	West Coast	Etihad Stadium	Magnificent jump over the top
21	Adam Goodes	Sydney	34%	Richmond	MCG	Classic flying mark
22	Colin Sylvia	Melbourne	38%	Richmond	MCG	Magnificent jump and grab
22	Ben Sinclair	Collingwood	49%	Brisbane Lions	MCG	Sinclair takes one laying down
22	John Butcher	Port Adelaide	13%	Western Bulldogs	AAMI Stadium	Butcher keeps his eye on the ball
23	Shannon Byrnes	Geelong	23%	Sydney	Skilled Stadium	Byrnes' effortless hanger
23	Tendai Mzungu	Fremantle	51%	Collingwood	Patersons Stadium	Remarkable one-handed grab
23	Drew Petrie	North Melbourne	26%	St Kilda	Etihad Stadium	Petrie leaps a mile in the air
24	David Wojcinski	Geelong	39%	Collingwood	MCG	Amazing leap
24	Drew Petrie	North Melbourne	18%	Richmond	Etihad Stadium	Huge grab in front of goal
24	Alex Silvagni	Fremantle	43%	Western Bulldogs	Etihad Stadium	Flying hanger over Barry Hall

== 2011 Finalists ==
Round	Nominees	Team	% of votes	Opposition	Ground	Description
9	Andrew Krakouer	Collingwood	42%	Adelaide	Etihad Stadium	Krakouer's Round 9 magnificent leap
14	Nic Naitanui	West Coast	17%	Carlton	Etihad Stadium	Naitanui flies high in Round 14
18	Andrew Walker	Carlton	41%	Essendon	MCG	Walker's thrilling hanger from Round 18

== See also ==
- Mark of the Year
- Goal of the Year
- 2011 AFL Goal of the Year
- 2011 AFL season
