= Travis Varcoe =

Australian rules footballer, born 1988

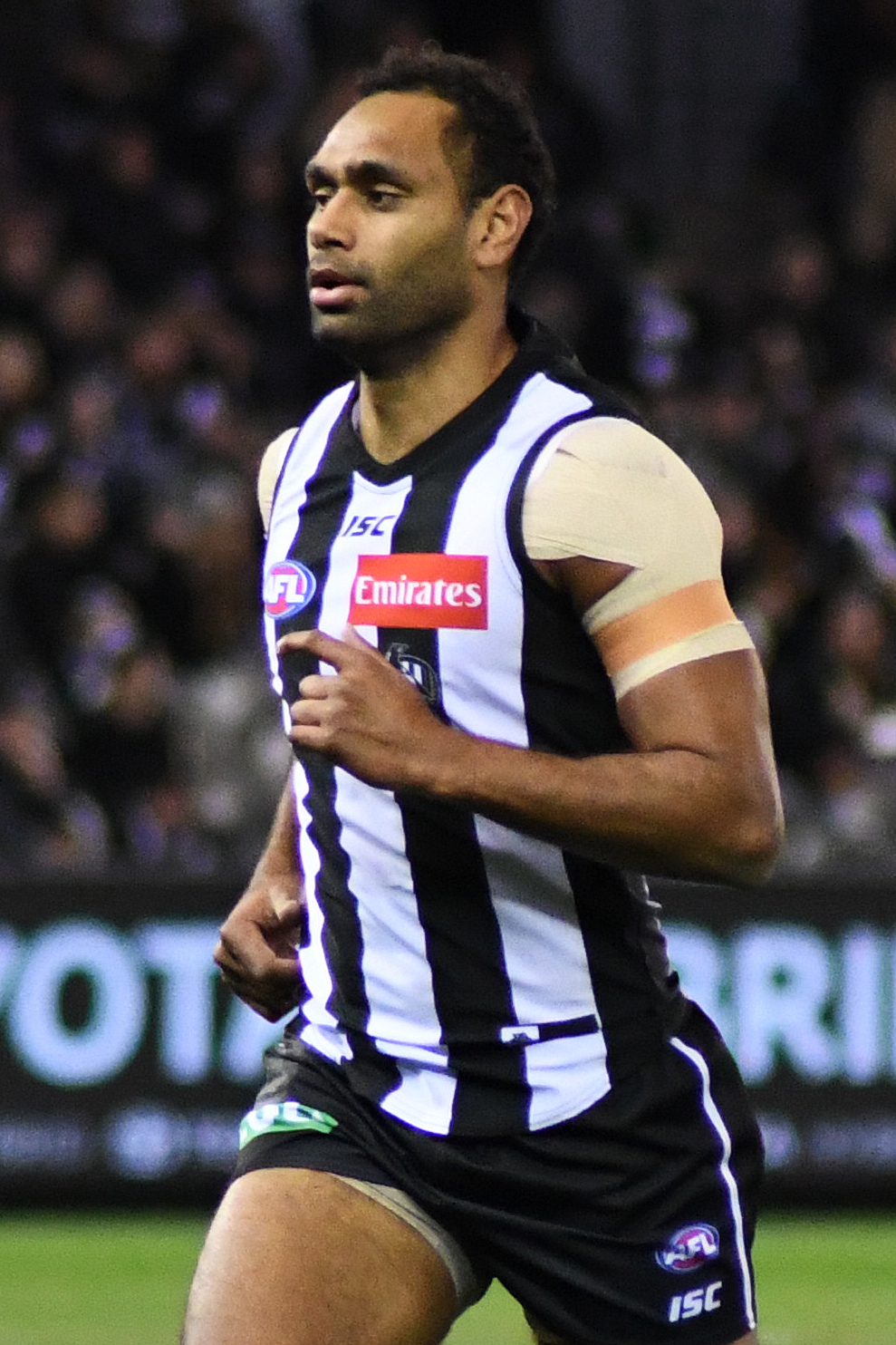
- Varcoe playing for Collingwood in August 2018

Personal information
- Full name: Travis Varcoe
- Born: 10 April 1988 (age 38); South Australia
- Original teams: Smithfield (SAAFL); Central District (SANFL)
- Draft: 15th overall, 2005; Geelong
- Height: 180 cm (5 ft 11 in)
- Weight: 80 kg (176 lb)
- Position: Utility

Playing career
Years	Club	Games (Goals)
2006–2014	Geelong	138 (130)
2015–2020	Collingwood	92 (41)
Total		230 (171)

Representative team honours^{2}
Years	Team	Games (Goals)
2009	Indigenous All-Stars	1

International team honours^{2}
2010	Australia	2
- ^{2} Representative statistics correct as of 2010.

Career highlights
- 2x Geelong premiership player (2009, 2011); VFL premiership player: (2007)

Travis Varcoe (born 10 April 1988) is a retired Australian rules footballer who played in the Australian Football League (AFL) for the Geelong Football Club from 2006 to 2014, and for the Collingwood Football Club from 2015 to 2020. He currently serves as an assistant coach for the Western Bulldogs. He also appeared as a contestant on the seventh season of I'm a Celebrity...Get Me Out of Here!.

== Career ==
Varcoe debuted in the South Australian National Football League (SANFL) for the Central District Football Club in 2005, at the age of 17. A foot injury early in the season held him back from performing in front of prospective recruiters, before Geelong selected him at the end of the first round as the 15th overall pick in the 2005 National Draft.

=== Geelong ===
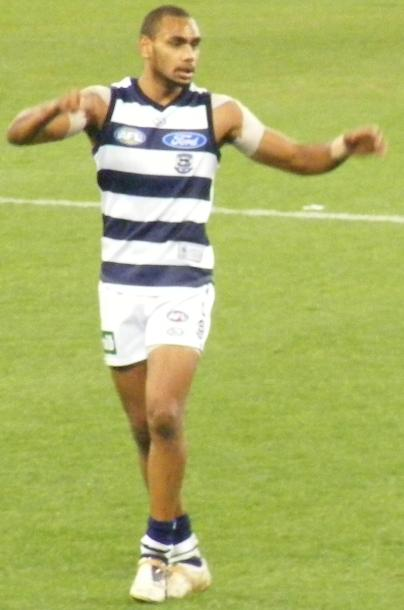
Varcoe playing for Geelong in 2008

Varcoe was given the honour of wearing Geelong's number five guernsey, previously worn by club legends Gary Ablett and Polly Farmer. Varcoe played as a forward pocket but could also play as a midfielder if required, drawing comparisons to Melbourne speedster Aaron Davey, with his consistent forward line pressure and high-speed chases downs on the field. Varcoe was often referred to as "The Magician", given his quick, at times invisible, handballs and tricky skills.

Varcoe played a key utility role for Geelong in 2009, which included a valuable contribution in the Grand Final, when Geelong defeated the St Kilda Football Club. Varcoe played a critical role in delivering a handball to Paul Chapman late in the game which resulted in a brilliant Chapman goal, giving Geelong a six-point lead. Shortly after, team mate Max Rooke scored a goal after the final siren to give Geelong a 12-point win.

Going into the 2010 AFL season, Varcoe put in the most promising pre-season of his career, only to succumb to a thumb injury that put him out for the first few weeks of the season. However, on his return to the senior side, Varcoe played well enough to finish ninth in Geelong's 2010 best and fairest count.

Varcoe kicked the first goal of the 2011 AFL Grand Final inside the first 10 seconds of the match. He also kicked the second goal of the match, but his goal at the eight-minute mark in the fourth quarter was possibly goal of the season. Before kicking the goal Varcoe took a mark in Geelong's backline whilst he was almost simultaneously bumped, forcing the ball free and the mark going unpaid. Varcoe then ran forward with the play, gathering possessions and ultimately converting a goal from inside 50 metres moments later. He picked up his second premiership medallion, after Geelong won by 38 points. As of Round 11, 2015, Varcoe had played in 149 games and, of those 149 games, had been on the winning side in won 122 of them. He also reached 100 wins more quickly than any other player, achieving that feat in his 113th game.

=== Collingwood ===
On 15 October 2014, Varcoe was traded to the Collingwood Football Club in a three-way trade between Collingwood, Geelong and Melbourne, which also saw Mitch Clark and Heritier Lumumba find new clubs. Despite being considered past his best during his last year at Geelong, Varcoe has enjoyed a renaissance of form since moving to Collingwood, playing arguably the best football of his career. Varcoe was considered one of the best recruits of the 2015 season.

After Collingwood had been eliminated from the 2020 AFL finals series, Varcoe announced his retirement from football.

== Personal life ==
In August 2007, Varcoe caused controversy after concerns were raised about the racial and sexual content featured on his MySpace page. The Geelong Football Club acted swiftly, removing the content immediately after it came to the club's attention.

Varcoe's sister Maggie died in August 2018, following an on-field collision whilst playing for Angle Vale Football Club in the Adelaide Footy League Grand Final. Travis continued to play for Collingwood in the weeks after her death as a tribute to her. The design of Collingwood's 2019 Indigenous guernsey was inspired by Maggie and was designed by Travis' sister-in-law.

== Statistics ==
Statistics are correct to the end of the 2020 season

Legend
G	Goals	K	Kicks	D	Disposals	T	Tackles
B	Behinds	H	Handballs	M	Marks
#	Played in that season's premiership team

Season	Team	No.	Games	Totals							Averages (per game)						
Season	Team	No.	Games	G	B	K	H	D	M	T	G	B	K	H	D	M	T
2006	Geelong	5	0	—	—	—	—	—	—	—	—	—	—	—	—	—	—
2007	Geelong	5	18	15	7	72	72	144	35	57	0.8	0.4	4.0	4.0	8.0	1.9	3.2
2008	Geelong	5	16	14	7	98	87	185	45	72	0.9	0.4	6.1	5.4	11.6	2.8	4.5
2009^{#}	Geelong	5	22	22	14	140	173	313	65	75	1.0	0.6	6.4	7.9	14.2	3.0	3.4
2010	Geelong	5	20	31	13	146	174	320	72	82	1.6	0.7	7.3	8.7	16.0	3.6	4.1
2011^{#}	Geelong	5	24	31	17	187	202	389	57	51	1.3	0.7	7.8	8.4	16.2	2.4	2.1
2012	Geelong	5	1	0	0	1	1	2	0	1	0.0	0.0	1.0	1.0	2.0	0.0	1.0
2013	Geelong	5	14	8	6	74	95	169	25	59	0.6	0.4	5.3	6.8	12.1	1.8	4.2
2014	Geelong	5	18	8	6	113	152	265	52	68	0.4	0.3	6.3	8.4	14.7	2.9	3.8
2015	Collingwood	18	22	10	10	185	193	378	90	89	0.5	0.5	8.4	8.8	17.2	4.1	4.0
2016	Collingwood	18	17	6	13	128	124	252	69	73	0.4	0.8	7.5	7.3	14.8	4.1	4.3
2017	Collingwood	18	8	2	1	49	60	109	25	19	0.3	0.1	6.1	7.5	13.6	3.1	2.4
2018	Collingwood	18	20	13	7	127	110	237	42	62	0.7	0.4	6.4	5.5	11.9	2.1	3.1
2019	Collingwood	18	16	9	6	94	105	199	59	42	0.6	0.4	5.9	6.6	12.4	3.7	2.6
2020	Collingwood	18	9	1	2	54	42	96	21	15	0.1	0.2	6.0	4.7	10.7	2.3	1.7
Career			230	171	109	1506	1641	3147	674	785	0.7	0.5	6.5	7.1	13.7	2.9	3.4
