= Josh Hunt =

Australian rules footballer

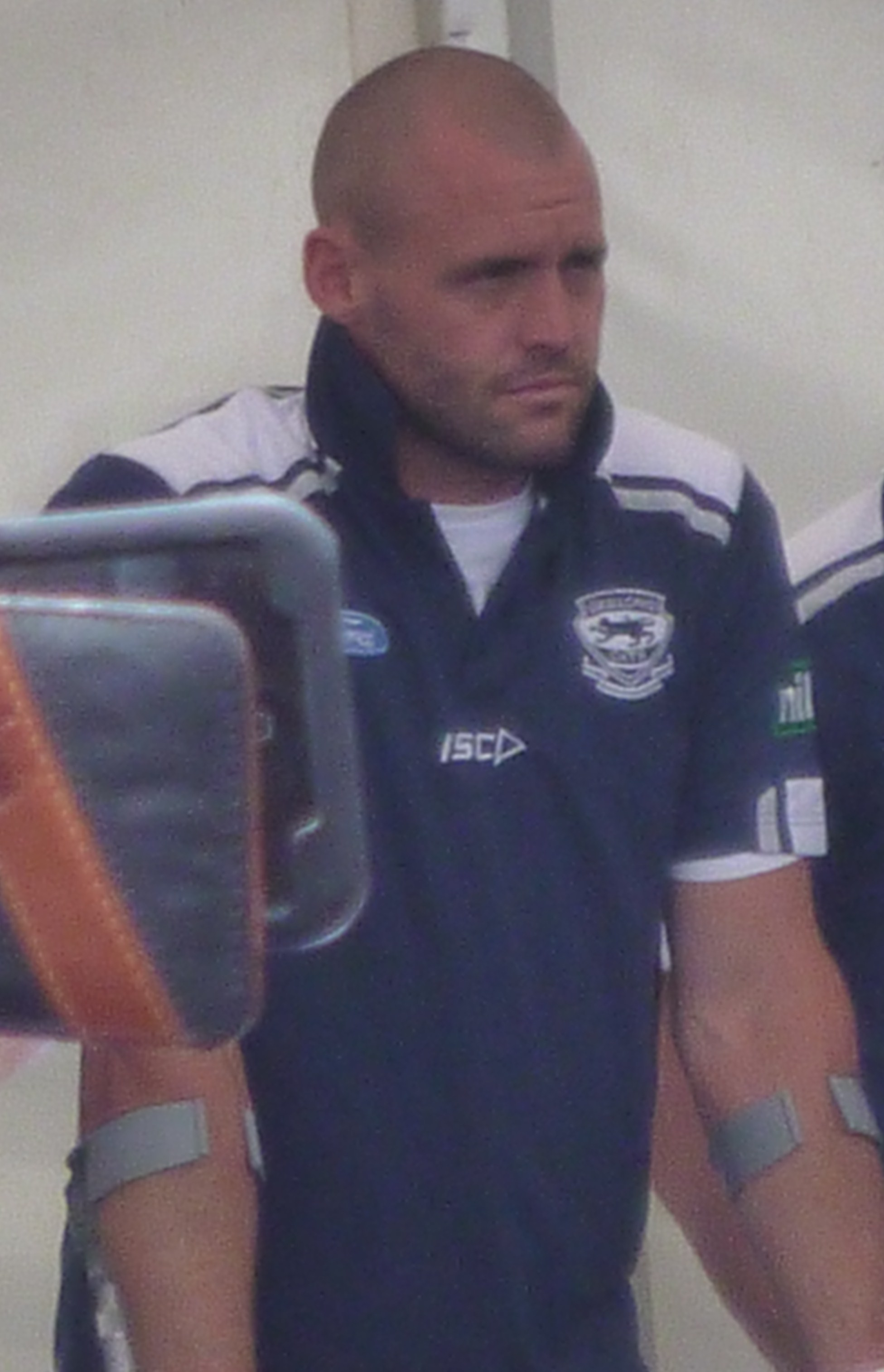

Personal information
- Full name: Joshua Michael Hunt
- Born: 14 March 1982 (age 44); Mildura, Victoria
- Original teams: Mildura Imperials (Sunraysia FL); Bendigo Pioneers (TAC Cup)
- Draft: No. 44, 2000 national draft
- Height: 186 cm (6 ft 1 in)
- Weight: 100 kg (220 lb)
- Position: Back pocket

Playing career^{1}
Years	Club	Games (Goals)
2001–2013	Geelong	198 (29)
2014	Greater Western Sydney	14 (4)
Total		212 (33)

International team honours
Years	Team	Games (Goals)
2008	Australia	1 (0)
- ^{1} Playing statistics correct to the end of 2014.

Career highlights
- Geelong premiership player 2007, 2011

Joshua Hunt (born 14 March 1982) is a former professional Australian rules footballer who played for the Geelong Football Club the Greater Western Sydney Giants in the Australian Football League.

== Career ==
=== Early career ===
Hunt was drafted by Geelong with pick 44 in the 2000 AFL draft. He was recruited from the Bendigo Pioneers, a team in the TAC Cup, where he had played most of his football in the forward line. He won a long-kicking competition at age 15, with his powerful left footed kicks regularly travelling over 60 metres.

He made his debut in round 8 of the 2001 season against Fremantle, but played only 15 games in his first three seasons. He missed most of 2003 because of severe fractures to his shins.

=== 2004–2014 ===
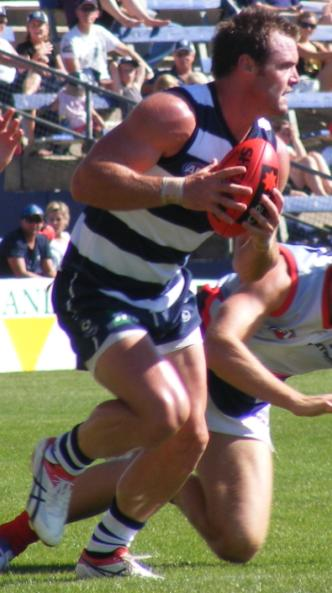
Hunt playing for Geelong

2004 was Hunt's breakthrough year. He played in 24 games, including finals, kicked 3 goals and had an average of 13 disposals.

He was also given the responsibility of kicking in after an opposition behind and has quickly become one of the best exponents of the art. His long, accurate, left foot kicks have often resulted in attacking opportunities for Geelong.

It was Hunt's outstanding performance in the backline that cemented him a weekly place in the playing team.

Hunt played 22 games in 2005, missing two games due to appendicitis. He was a late withdrawal from the Cats' round 21 one-point win against Richmond, and had surgery the next day. He missed round 22 and returned to play against Melbourne in the following weekend's elimination final.

In 2006, he was criticised when he shirked taking a mark in a round 19 match against St Kilda. St Kilda capitalised on the incident to goal and steal the match. Hunt's bravery and attack on the ball, despite his bulk was brought under question.

2007 was a reasonable season for Hunt, playing 16 games, with an average of 17 disposals. He ventured outside of his usual position in the backline to kick a total of three goals.

Hunt was hospitalised after Geelong's narrow 5-point preliminary final victory over Collingwood for dehydration. He was vomiting after the game after receiving a knock to the stomach, and was admitted to Geelong Hospital the following morning to be treated for dehydration. He recovered in time to play a part in Geelong's premiership victory in the following weekend's grand final against Port Adelaide.

Hunt was a late addition to the Australian squad for the 2008 International Rules Series against Ireland, replacing Geelong teammate Max Rooke, who was forced to withdraw from the team with illness.

An ACL injury sustained in the preseason kept him sidelined for 2009, missing out on playing in Geelong's 2009 premiership team.

He returned in 2010, playing 24 matches and followed on in 2011 with 22 matches, including his second premiership victory, in the 2011 AFL Grand Final.

On 30 September 2013, Hunt was delisted by Geelong after 13 seasons. On 23 October 2013, he signed a one-year deal with Greater Western Sydney.

On 26 August 2014, Hunt announced his retirement from the AFL.

== Statistics ==
Season	Team	No.	Games	Totals							Averages (per game)						
Season	Team	No.	Games	G	B	K	H	D	M	T	G	B	K	H	D	M	T
2001	Geelong	41	6	0	0	16	15	31	7	8	0.0	0.0	2.7	2.5	5.2	1.2	1.3
2002	Geelong	41	7	1	1	23	10	33	13	15	0.1	0.1	3.3	1.4	4.7	1.9	2.1
2003	Geelong	41	2	0	0	13	8	21	6	6	0.0	0.0	6.5	4.0	10.5	3.0	3.0
2004	Geelong	41	24	3	3	191	114	305	68	62	0.1	0.1	8.0	4.8	12.7	2.8	2.6
2005	Geelong	41	22	2	1	238	116	354	98	30	0.1	0.0	10.8	5.3	16.1	4.5	1.4
2006	Geelong	8	22	4	4	239	152	391	96	49	0.2	0.2	10.9	6.9	17.8	4.4	2.2
2007	Geelong	8	16	3	1	143	132	275	72	43	0.2	0.1	8.9	8.3	17.2	4.5	2.7
2008	Geelong	8	23	3	3	200	189	389	89	38	0.1	0.1	8.7	8.2	16.9	3.9	1.7
2009	Geelong	8	0	—	—	—	—	—	—	—	—	—	—	—	—	—	—
2010	Geelong	8	24	1	3	210	181	391	117	42	0.0	0.1	8.8	7.5	16.3	4.9	1.8
2011	Geelong	8	22	4	1	203	141	344	103	58	0.2	0.0	9.2	6.4	15.6	4.7	2.6
2012	Geelong	8	18	5	5	185	97	282	106	43	0.3	0.3	10.3	5.4	15.7	5.9	2.4
2013	Geelong	8	12	3	1	105	67	172	54	18	0.3	0.1	8.8	5.6	14.3	4.5	1.5
2014	Greater Western Sydney	32	14	4	4	135	61	196	67	29	0.3	0.3	9.6	4.4	14.0	4.8	2.1
Career			212	33	27	1901	1283	3184	896	441	0.2	0.1	9.0	6.0	15.0	4.2	2.1
