= Andrew Mackie =

Australian rules footballer, born 1984

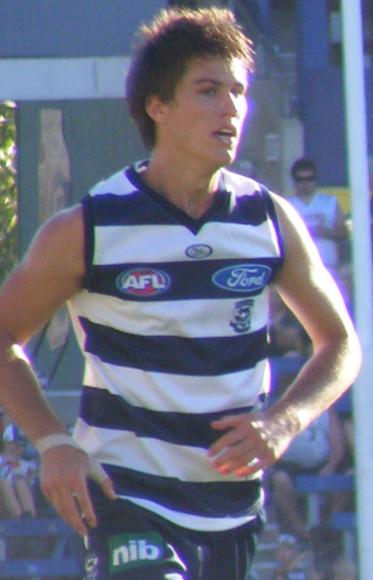

Personal information
- Full name: Andrew John Mackie
- Born: 7 August 1984 (age 42); Adelaide, South Australia
- Original team: Glenelg (SANFL)
- Draft: No. 7, 2002 National Draft
- Height: 193 cm (6 ft 4 in)
- Weight: 84 kg (185 lb)
- Position: Defender

Playing career^{1}
| Years | Club | Games (Goals) |
| 2004–2017 | Geelong | 280 (100) |
- ^{1} Playing statistics correct to the end of 2017.

Career highlights
- 3× AFL premiership player (2007, 2009, 2011); 2× AFL pre-season premiership (2006, 2009); All-Australian team 2013; 2004 AFL Rising Star nominee

Andrew John Mackie (born 7 August 1984) is a former professional Australian rules footballer who played for the Geelong Football Club in the Australian Football League (AFL).

== Early life ==
Mackie was recruited from Sacred Heart College and South Australian National Football League (SANFL) club Glenelg by the Geelong Football Club with the 7th pick in the 2002 National AFL draft. It was considered a surprise selection, as he was not well known at the time, not having gone through the NAB AFL Draft Camp.

After spending the 2003 AFL season in the Geelong reserves further developing his game, Mackie made his senior debut in 2004, and picked up a Rising Star Nomination for a three-goal performance. Despite having played as a midfielder for Glenelg, Geelong attempted to turn Mackie into a key forward to fill a long-standing void, with mixed results.

== AFL career ==
In the 2007 season Mackie began to show great improvement in his game and was one of the key players to Geelong's rise to the top. Mackie began to play as a rebounding defender, ironically kicking a career-best four goals against Richmond in Round 6 in one of his first games down back, and played another great game in Round 11 2007 when he played his first ever game against Adelaide at AAMI Stadium. He racked up 26 disposals helping Geelong to an important win and played well against Adelaide again in Round 19. He continued his solid form for the rest of the season and played a big part in Geelong's hard-fought preliminary final win over Collingwood. Mackie was a key player in the 2007 premiership team, setting up play for the Cats and kicking a goal. Mackie played his 280th and final game in the 2017 Preliminary Final, where he collected 19 disposals and 5 marks in a 61-point loss to Adelaide.

== Personal life ==
In 2005, a late night incident involving Mackie, his club teammate Steve Johnson and the police was reported by the media. Out celebrating Mackie's 21st birthday, Mackie and Johnson were involved in a heated discussion with local police whilst waiting for a taxi in the early hours of the morning. Police charged both Mackie and Johnson with being drunk in a public place, and sent both back to the Geelong police station. Mackie was released after the charges were laid, while Johnson was detained for a further four hours.

He is a part-owner of a thoroughbred racehorse with former teammate Brad Ottens.

Mackie's cousin, Liam Mackie, was drafted to Collingwood in the 2017 rookie draft. He was delisted at the end of the 2017 season without having played a game, and subsequently joined Box Hill in the Victorian Football League (VFL). As of 2024, he is the co-captain of the Northern Bullants.

== Statistics ==
Legend
| G | Goals | K | Kicks | D | Disposals | T | Tackles |
| B | Behinds | H | Handballs | M | Marks |

| Season | Team | No. | Games | Totals | | | | | | | Averages (per game) | | | | | | | Votes |
| Season | Team | No. | Games | G | B | K | H | D | M | T | G | B | K | H | D | M | T | Votes |
|---|---|---|---|---|---|---|---|---|---|---|---|---|---|---|---|---|---|---|
| 2004 | Geelong | 4 | 13 | 9 | 5 | 67 | 25 | 92 | 33 | 18 | 0.7 | 0.4 | 5.2 | 1.9 | 7.1 | 2.5 | 1.4 | 0 |
| 2005 | Geelong | 4 | 10 | 9 | 4 | 82 | 32 | 114 | 33 | 25 | 0.9 | 0.4 | 8.2 | 3.2 | 11.4 | 3.3 | 2.5 | 0 |
| 2006 | Geelong | 4 | 14 | 10 | 10 | 150 | 70 | 220 | 75 | 26 | 0.7 | 0.7 | 10.7 | 5.0 | 15.7 | 5.4 | 1.9 | 1 |
| 2007 | Geelong | 4 | 24 | 13 | 14 | 315 | 162 | 477 | 153 | 38 | 0.5 | 0.6 | 13.1 | 6.8 | 19.9 | 6.4 | 1.6 | 2 |
| 2008 | Geelong | 4 | 21 | 11 | 9 | 290 | 179 | 469 | 141 | 38 | 0.5 | 0.4 | 13.8 | 8.5 | 22.3 | 6.7 | 1.8 | 3 |
| 2009 | Geelong | 4 | 24 | 8 | 5 | 280 | 226 | 506 | 154 | 49 | 0.3 | 0.2 | 11.7 | 9.4 | 21.1 | 6.4 | 2.0 | 0 |
| 2010 | Geelong | 4 | 22 | 4 | 8 | 312 | 175 | 487 | 144 | 53 | 0.2 | 0.4 | 14.2 | 8.0 | 22.1 | 6.5 | 2.4 | 1 |
| 2011 | Geelong | 4 | 22 | 4 | 3 | 287 | 146 | 433 | 122 | 59 | 0.2 | 0.1 | 13.0 | 6.6 | 19.7 | 5.5 | 2.7 | 0 |
| 2012 | Geelong | 4 | 23 | 12 | 7 | 311 | 120 | 431 | 123 | 60 | 0.5 | 0.3 | 13.5 | 5.2 | 18.7 | 5.3 | 2.6 | 3 |
| 2013 | Geelong | 4 | 25 | 5 | 6 | 357 | 162 | 519 | 156 | 43 | 0.2 | 0.2 | 14.3 | 6.5 | 20.8 | 6.2 | 1.7 | 1 |
| 2014 | Geelong | 4 | 22 | 5 | 5 | 297 | 131 | 428 | 137 | 45 | 0.2 | 0.2 | 13.5 | 6.0 | 19.4 | 6.2 | 2.0 | 0 |
| 2015 | Geelong | 4 | 15 | 6 | 0 | 203 | 112 | 315 | 104 | 27 | 0.4 | 0.0 | 13.5 | 7.5 | 21.0 | 6.9 | 1.8 | 3 |
| 2016 | Geelong | 4 | 22 | 1 | 5 | 262 | 134 | 396 | 109 | 64 | 0.0 | 0.2 | 11.9 | 6.1 | 18.0 | 5.0 | 2.9 | 0 |
| 2017 | Geelong | 4 | 23 | 3 | 2 | 315 | 173 | 488 | 123 | 46 | 0.1 | 0.1 | 13.7 | 7.5 | 21.2 | 5.3 | 2.0 | 0 |
| Career | | | 280 | 100 | 83 | 3528 | 1847 | 5375 | 1607 | 591 | 0.4 | 0.3 | 12.6 | 6.6 | 19.2 | 5.7 | 2.1 | 14 |
