= George Burbury =

Australian rules footballer

Personal information
- Full name: George Burbury
- Born: 16 June 1992 (age 34)
- Original team: Hobart (SFL)
- Draft: No. 40, 2011 Rookie draft
- Height: 186 cm (6 ft 1 in)
- Weight: 80 kg (176 lb)
- Position: Midfielder

Playing career^{1}
Years	Club	Games (Goals)
2013–2014	Geelong	7 (3)
- ^{1} Playing statistics correct to the end of 2014.

George Burbury (born 16 June 1992) is a former professional Australian rules footballer who played for the Geelong Football Club in the Australian Football League (AFL). Burbury made his debut in round 9 of the 2013 AFL season. Burbury was delisted at the conclusion of the 2014 AFL season
