= Josh Cowan =

Australian rules footballer

Personal information
- Full name: Joshua Cowan
- Born: 16 March 1991 (age 35)
- Original teams: Daylesford (CHFL); St Patrick's College, Ballarat; North Ballarat Rebels (TAC Cup)
- Draft: No. 56, 2009 national draft
- Height: 184 cm (6 ft 0 in)
- Weight: 72 kg (159 lb)
- Position: Midfield / half-back

Playing career^{1}
Years	Club	Games (Goals)
2011–2017	Geelong	16 (5)
- ^{1} Playing statistics correct to the end of 2017.

Joshua Cowan (born 16 March 1991) is a former professional Australian rules footballer who played for the Geelong Football Club in the Australian Football League (AFL). A versatile player, he is able to play in the midfield as well as on the half-back line.

== Schooling life ==
Cowan's school life began at Daylesford Primary School where he established himself as an avid sportsman, during this time he joined Daylesford Football Club. He moved on to Daylesford Secondary College where he continued to excel at sports. At the beginning of year 11 Josh moved from Daylesford Secondary College to St Patrick's College, Ballarat a catholic school in Ballarat, Victoria. it was here that he joined the 1st XVIII, a highly successful team that lost in the grand final of the herald sun shield. Whilst at St Patrick's College, Ballarat Josh was recruited by TAC Cup club the North Ballarat Rebels.

== Early life ==
Cowan grew up in and played his junior football for Daylesford, Victoria. Cowan represented Victoria Country at the AFL Under 18 Championships in 2009, and averaged 20 disposals in the TAC Cup in 2009. He is known as being a smart midfielder with great ball-winning ability, composure, decision-making skills and effective disposal and is strong overhead for his size.

== AFL career ==
Cowan was drafted by the Geelong Football Club with their fifth selection, and was the fifty-sixth overall draft pick in the 2009 AFL draft. Cowan made his debut in round 10 of the 2011 season against Gold Coast coming on in the third quarter as a substitute and finishing with 9 possessions, 5 marks, 2 tackles and a goal.

== Statistics ==
Statistics are correct to end of 2011 season. Averages are in brackets.

Season	Team	#	Games	Disposals	Kicks	Handballs	Marks	Tackles	Goals	Behinds
2010	Geelong	41	—	—	—	—	—	—	—	—
2011	Geelong	18	3	30 (10.0)	14 (4.7)	16 (5.3)	10 (3.3)	8 (2.7)	1 (0.3)	1 (0.3)
Career totals			3	30 (10.0)	14 (4.7)	16 (5.3)	10 (3.3)	8 (2.7)	1 (0.3)	1 (0.3)
