= David Wojcinski =

Australian rules footballer (born 1980)

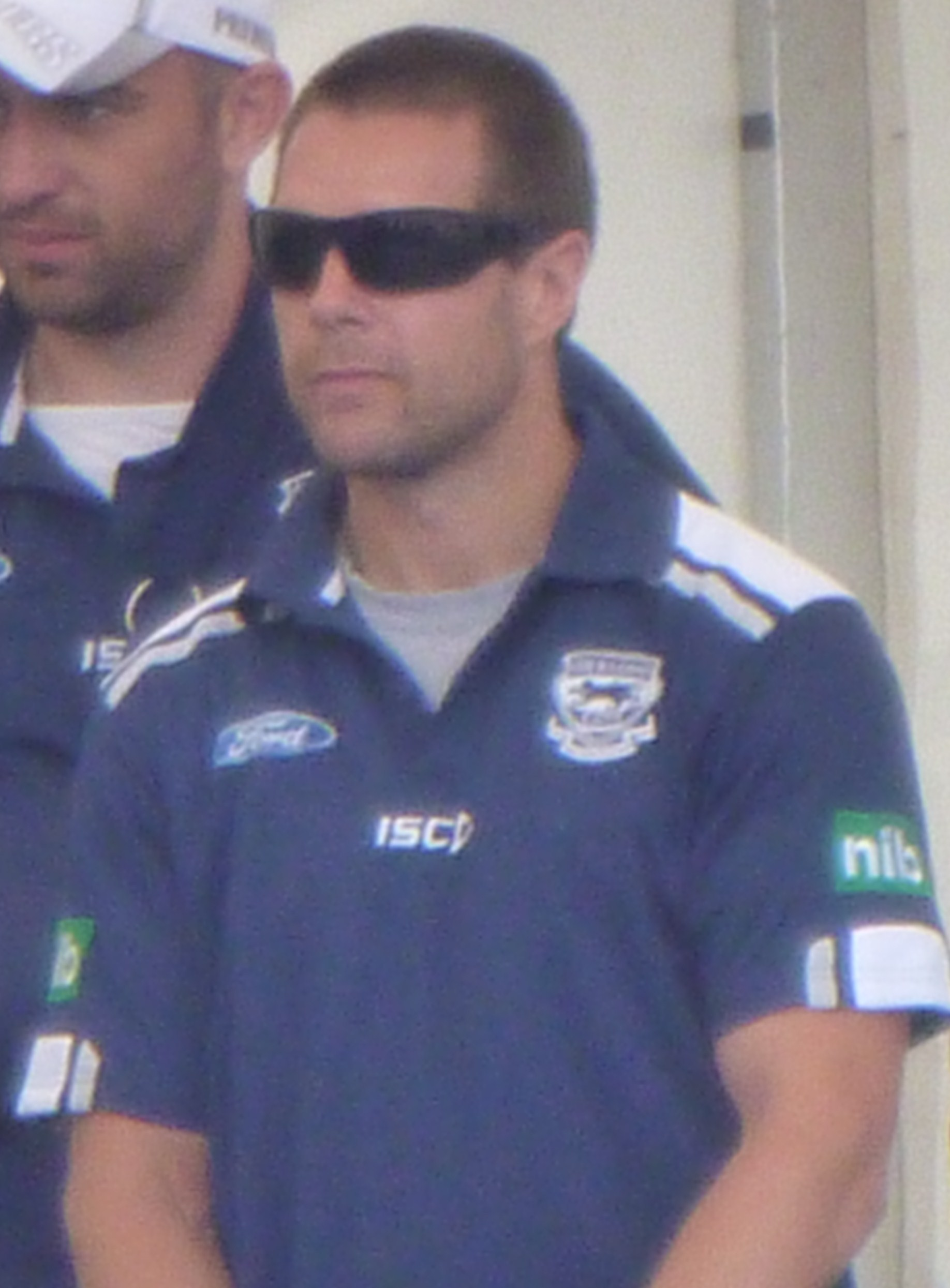
- David Wojcinski

Personal information
- Full name: David Wojcinski
- Born: 18 September 1980 (age 46)
- Original team: Gippsland Power (TAC Cup)
- Draft: Pick 24, 1998, Geelong
- Height: 180 cm (5 ft 11 in)
- Weight: 80 kg (176 lb)

Club information
- Current club: Geelong
- Number: 40

Playing career^{1}
Years	Club	Games (Goals)
1999–2012	Geelong	203 (66)

International team honours^{2}
Years	Team	Games (Goals)
2010–2011	Australia	2
- ^{1} Playing statistics correct to the end of 2012.^{2} Representative statistics correct as of 2011.

Career highlights
- 3× AFL premiership player: 2007, 2009, 2011; VFL premiership player: 2012; Most Improved Player award: 2004

David Wojcinski (born 18 September 1980) is a former Australian rules footballer who played for the Geelong Football Club in the Australian Football League (AFL).

== Career ==
Wojcinski made his debut in 1998. He won the club's Most Improved Player award for 2004.

In 2007 he returned from a serious knee injury to play a major part for the Geelong side with his pace off half back. He was rewarded with a premiership medal in September.

After injuring a tendon in his right finger during a 2008 pre-season practice match against the Richmond Tigers, Wojcinski found he required surgery to his little finger. He made a quick recovery from this surgery, playing against Essendon in Round 2. Whilst 2008 begun well for Wojcinski, Round 15 saw him injure an Achilles tendon, ruling him out until the Preliminary final against the Western Bulldogs more than two months later. His lack of match fitness jeopardized his selection for the Grand Final side, which was announced on 25 September 2008. The selection left Wojcinski out of the starting 22, and as an emergency, Paul Chapman was chosen over him after returning from his own injury. Mark Thompson, coach of the Geelong Cats, confirmed the reason for "Wojo" missing out was simply due to his bad run with injury. He quoted "fit and in good form he's (Wojcinski) in our best 22, no doubt. And everybody in the room, everybody that knows Geelong would know that,".

David overcame the disappointment of missing out on Grand Final selection in 2008 to produce career best form over the following years. He rightfully won his spot back in the 2009 Grand Final as Geelong came from behind to beat St. Kilda and win their second premiership in three years. In 2011, David was one of only a handful of players to add a third premiership medal to his collection, as Geelong overpowered Collingwood in the final quarter of the Grand Final to be runaway victors. David's dash off half back and his 'take them on' attitude was a key component in Geelong's success, and during his career was one of the fastest and most exciting players to watch with his electrifying speed both from the half-back flank and through the midfield.

In 2012 in the Victorian Football League (VFL) when playing a game against Casey Scorpions, he clashed with Jack Viney who he suffered a broken jaw in two places during his debut VFL match. In a separate incident, David was charged with striking Viney, which resulted in a four-match suspension.

David finished 2011 on 199 games and took until Round 11 2012 to play his 200th. He went on to play only 3 more games that season before announcing his retirement after the elimination final loss to Fremantle Football Club. He did, however, play a crucial role in the Cats VFL Premiership that same year, putting the icing on the cake of an excellent football career.

== Statistics ==
Legend
G	Goals	K	Kicks	D	Disposals	T	Tackles
B	Behinds	H	Handballs	M	Marks

Season	Team	No.	Games	Totals							Averages (per game)						
Season	Team	No.	Games	G	B	K	H	D	M	T	G	B	K	H	D	M	T
1999	Geelong	40	5	1	1	7	9	16	0	5	0.2	0.2	1.4	1.8	3.2	0.0	1.0
2000	Geelong	40	9	1	1	49	27	76	15	14	0.1	0.1	5.4	3.0	8.4	1.7	1.6
2001	Geelong	40	6	0	0	32	18	50	4	10	0.0	0.0	5.3	3.0	8.3	0.7	1.7
2002	Geelong	40	17	4	1	119	71	190	35	35	0.2	0.1	7.0	4.2	11.2	2.1	2.1
2003	Geelong	40	18	7	4	152	71	223	38	25	0.4	0.2	8.4	3.9	12.4	2.1	1.4
2004	Geelong	40	21	9	9	172	104	276	54	40	0.4	0.4	8.2	5.0	13.1	2.6	1.9
2005	Geelong	40	2	0	2	21	8	29	7	6	0.0	1.0	10.5	4.0	14.5	3.5	3.0
2006	Geelong	40	15	1	6	116	80	196	45	30	0.1	0.4	7.7	5.3	13.1	3.0	2.0
2007	Geelong	40	25	14	9	196	185	381	77	52	0.6	0.4	7.8	7.4	15.2	3.1	2.1
2008	Geelong	40	14	8	8	118	116	234	46	25	0.6	0.6	8.4	8.3	16.7	3.3	1.8
2009	Geelong	40	21	3	4	153	200	353	57	64	0.1	0.2	7.3	9.5	16.8	2.7	3.0
2010	Geelong	40	24	6	5	191	232	423	92	44	0.2	0.2	8.0	9.7	17.6	3.8	1.8
2011	Geelong	40	22	12	9	162	173	335	76	49	0.6	0.4	7.4	7.9	15.2	3.4	2.2
2012	Geelong	40	4	0	1	33	22	55	13	14	0.0	0.2	8.2	5.5	13.8	3.2	3.5
Career			203	66	60	1521	1316	2837	559	413	0.3	0.3	7.5	6.5	14.0	2.8	2.0

== Personal life ==
Wojcinski grew up in Heyfield, Victoria. He is the son of Lee and Charlie Wojcinski and has three sisters: Deanne, Sarah and Emma. Wojcinski married partner Casey Bell in October 2008 at Port Douglas, after much disappointment after being dropped from the AFL Grand Final. David and Casey have three children: sons Alfie (2006) and Monty (2009) and daughter Olive (2011).

In 2008, Wojcinski was an ambassador for an anti-booze-fuelled-violence campaign run by the Geelong Advertiser titled "Just Think". In this role, Wojcinski appeared in advertising alongside fellow ambassadors, and former Geelong teammates, Tom Harley and James Kelly.

Wojcinski retired from AFL football in 2012. He continued to play football for the Newtown & Chilwell Eagles in the Geelong Football League and later also coached them, until he resigned at the end of the 2015 season.
