= Joel Corey =

Australian rules footballer (born 1982)

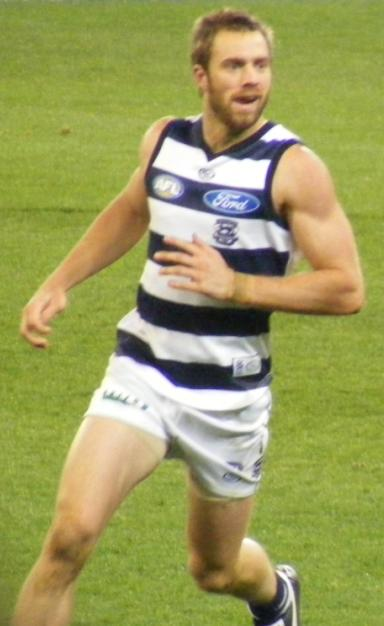

Personal information
- Full name: Joel Corey
- Nickname: Smithy
- Born: 17 February 1982 (age 44); Perth, Western Australia
- Original team: East Perth (WAFL)
- Draft: 8th overall, 1999; Geelong
- Height: 191 cm (6 ft 3 in)
- Weight: 89 kg (196 lb)
- Position: Midfielder

Playing career^{1}
Years	Club	Games (Goals)
2000–2013	Geelong	276 (79)

Representative team honours^{2}
Years	Team	Games (Goals)
2008	Dream Team	1 (0)

International team honours^{2}
2004	Australia	
- ^{1} Playing statistics correct to the end of 2013.^{2} Representative statistics correct as of 2008.

Career highlights
- 3× AFL premiership player: 2007, 2009, 2011; 2× Carji Greeves Medal: 2005, 2008; 2× All-Australian team: 2007, 2008

Joel Corey (born 17 February 1982) is a former Australian rules footballer who played for the Geelong Football Club in the Australian Football League (AFL). A midfielder, 1.90 metres (6 ft 3 in) tall and weighing 87 kilograms (192 lb), Corey is able to contribute inside or outside while on the ball.

Corey is a dual Carji Greeves Medallist, two-time All-Australian, and was part of Geelong's AFL premiership-winning teams in 2007, 2009 and 2011. He was also selected in the Dream Team, a representative Australian rules football team that contested in the AFL Hall of Fame Tribute Match, as well as being selected to represent Australia in International rules football.

Corey currently serves as a development coach for the Fremantle Football Club.

== Career ==
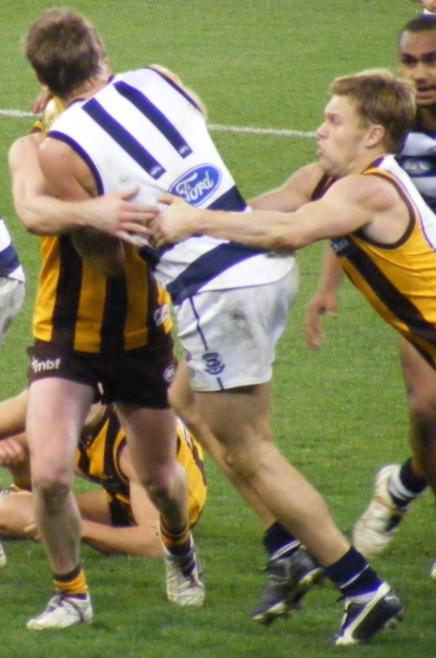
Corey being tackled by Hawthorn's Sam Mitchell in round 17, 2008.

Corey was drafted with Geelong's 8th pick in the 1999 draft as a 17-year-old. Corey has built a reputation as a midfielder with the ability to clear the ball from packed situations. He has also played defensively.

Highlights of his career to date include a 2005 Carji Greeves Medal victory, selection in the Australian International Rules team of 2004, and selection as an All-Australian in 2007 and 2008. Corey played an integral part in Geelong's record breaking 2007 Grand Final win. In the same year he was part of the 6-man leadership group at Geelong.

== Statistics ==
Legend
G	Goals	K	Kicks	D	Disposals	T	Tackles
B	Behinds	H	Handballs	M	Marks

Season	Team	No.	Games	Totals							Averages (per game)						
Season	Team	No.	Games	G	B	K	H	D	M	T	G	B	K	H	D	M	T
2000	Geelong	11	5	2	2	39	23	62	11	8	0.4	0.4	7.8	4.6	12.4	2.2	1.6
2001	Geelong	11	14	3	4	102	36	138	39	26	0.2	0.3	7.3	2.6	9.9	2.8	1.9
2002	Geelong	11	20	5	4	198	165	363	57	61	0.3	0.2	9.9	8.3	18.2	2.9	3.1
2003	Geelong	11	22	9	6	250	157	407	78	70	0.4	0.3	11.4	7.1	18.5	3.5	3.2
2004	Geelong	11	22	9	13	242	173	415	92	75	0.4	0.6	11.0	7.9	18.9	4.2	3.4
2005	Geelong	11	21	5	11	292	205	497	120	81	0.2	0.5	13.9	9.8	23.7	5.7	3.9
2006	Geelong	11	22	8	4	298	231	529	107	64	0.4	0.2	13.5	10.5	24.0	4.9	2.9
2007	Geelong	11	25	7	9	338	312	650	119	134	0.3	0.4	13.5	12.5	26.0	4.8	5.4
2008	Geelong	11	25	6	7	339	391	730	116	138	0.2	0.3	13.6	15.6	29.2	4.6	5.5
2009	Geelong	11	23	7	4	306	356	662	106	115	0.3	0.2	13.3	15.5	28.8	4.6	5.0
2010	Geelong	11	14	2	3	153	185	338	51	71	0.1	0.2	10.9	13.2	24.1	3.6	5.1
2011	Geelong	11	21	8	5	257	262	519	77	90	0.4	0.2	12.2	12.5	24.7	3.7	4.3
2012	Geelong	11	20	3	5	189	239	428	54	103	0.2	0.3	9.5	12.0	21.4	2.7	5.2
2013	Geelong	11	22	5	3	170	288	458	72	103	0.2	0.1	7.7	13.1	20.8	3.3	4.7
Career			276	79	80	3173	3023	6196	1099	1139	0.3	0.3	11.5	11.0	22.4	4.0	4.1

== Honours and achievements ==
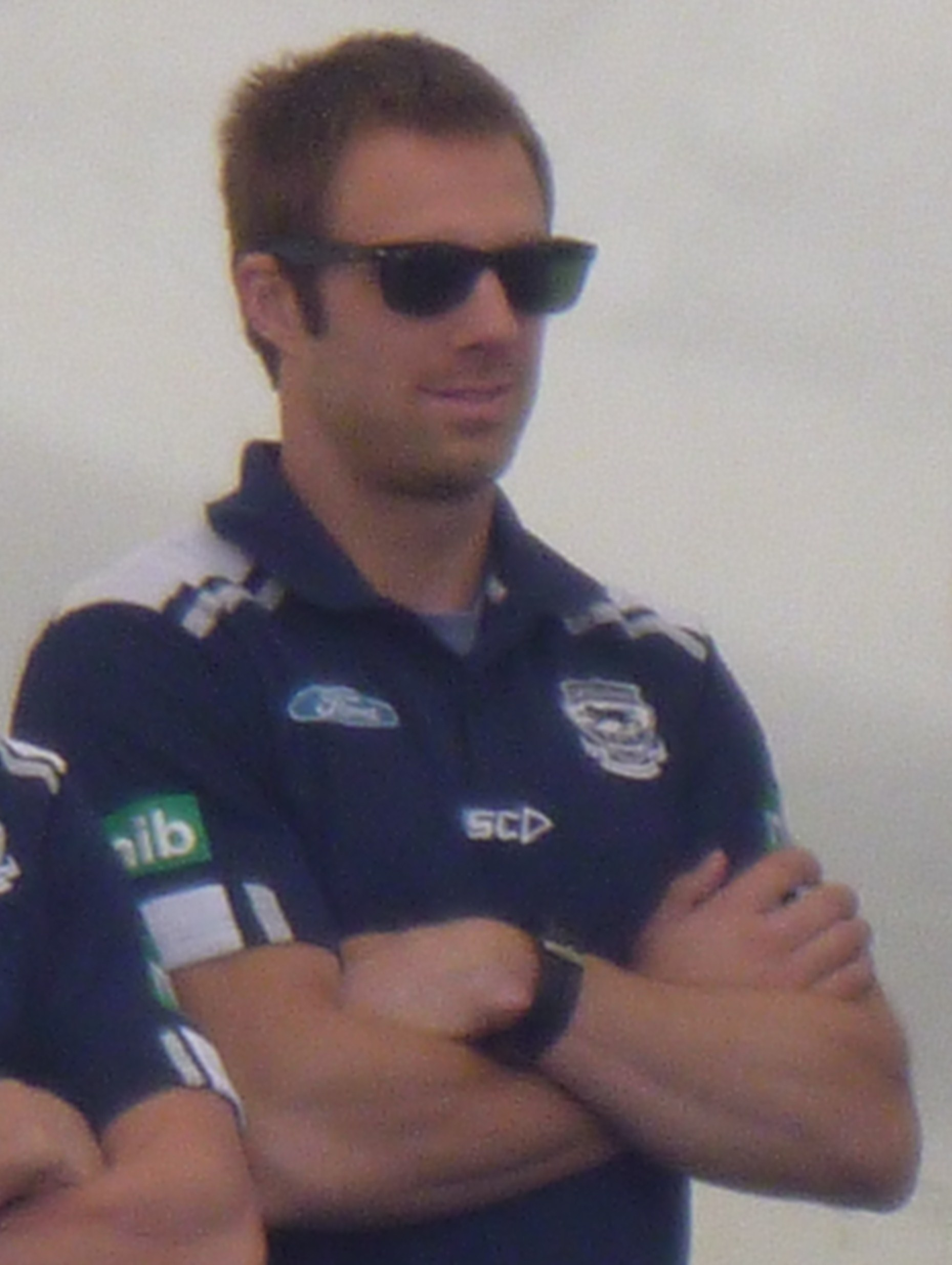
Corey at Geelong's 2011 premiership victory parade.

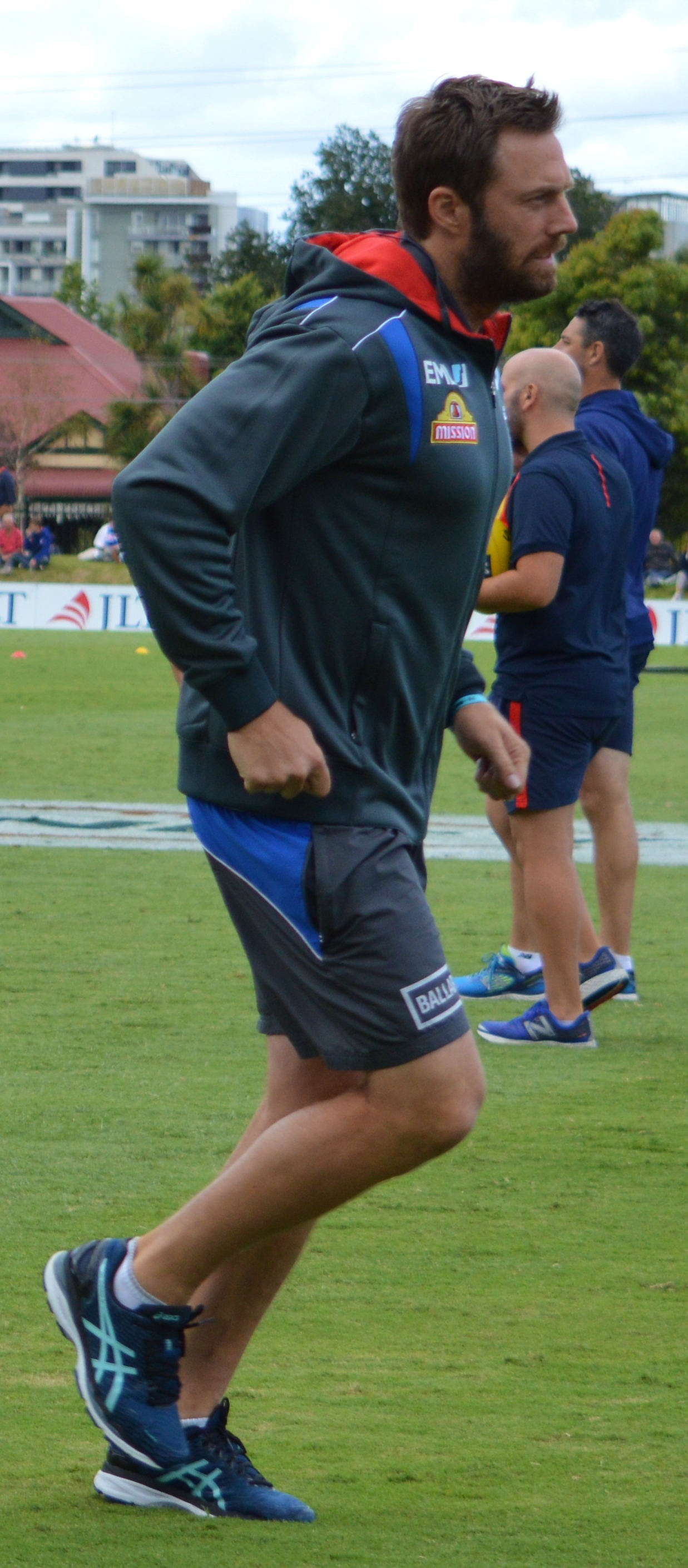
Joel Corey as Western Bulldogs midfield coach in February 2017

AFL

- AFL Premiership Player (2007, 2009, 2011)
- 2-time All-Australian (2007, 2008)
- AFL Pre-Season Premiership Player (2006)
- International Rules Series Representative (2004)
- Western Australia State of Origin (2005, 2006, 2007)

Geelong Football Club

- Geelong Best and Fairest Winner (2005, 2008)
- Geelong Football Club Coach's Award (2005)
- Geelong Football Club Most Determined & Most Dedicated Player Award (2002)

U18 Juniors

- All Australian U/18 (1999)
- Western Australia U/18 (1999)
- Ron Barassi Medalist (1999)
- U17 International Rules (1999)

Milestones:

- AFL debut: Round 17, 2000 (vs. St Kilda) at the Telstra Dome (Geelong lost by 24 points)
- Finals debut: Elimination final, 2000 (vs. Hawthorn) at the Telstra Dome (Geelong lost by 9 points)
- 50th game: Round 11, 2003 (vs. Carlton) at the Telstra Dome (Geelong won by 40 points)
- 100th game: Round 20, 2005 (vs. Melbourne) at Skilled Stadium (Geelong lost by 1 point)
- 150th game: Preliminary final, 2007 (vs. Collingwood) at the Melbourne Cricket Ground (Geelong won by 5 points)
- 200th game: Round 1, 2010 (vs. Essendon) at the Melbourne Cricket Ground (Geelong won by 31 points)

== Personal life ==
Corey graduated from John Septimus Roe Anglican Community School in 1999. He was a junior Australian representative in baseball when he was younger, but Corey gave baseball up to pursue a football career. Outside of football, Corey is a quiet, humble person who does not particularly enjoy doing interviews saying even in Primary school speaking in front of the class wasn't his forte.

Corey enjoys surfing, in Torquay with teammate Cameron Ling, as he finds it "pretty peaceful, it clears your head". His nickname, Smithy, comes from the fact that his surname is also a popular boys given name. Corey has two dogs, a Kelpie and a Staffordshire terrier.
