= Brad Ottens =

Australian rules footballer (born 1980)

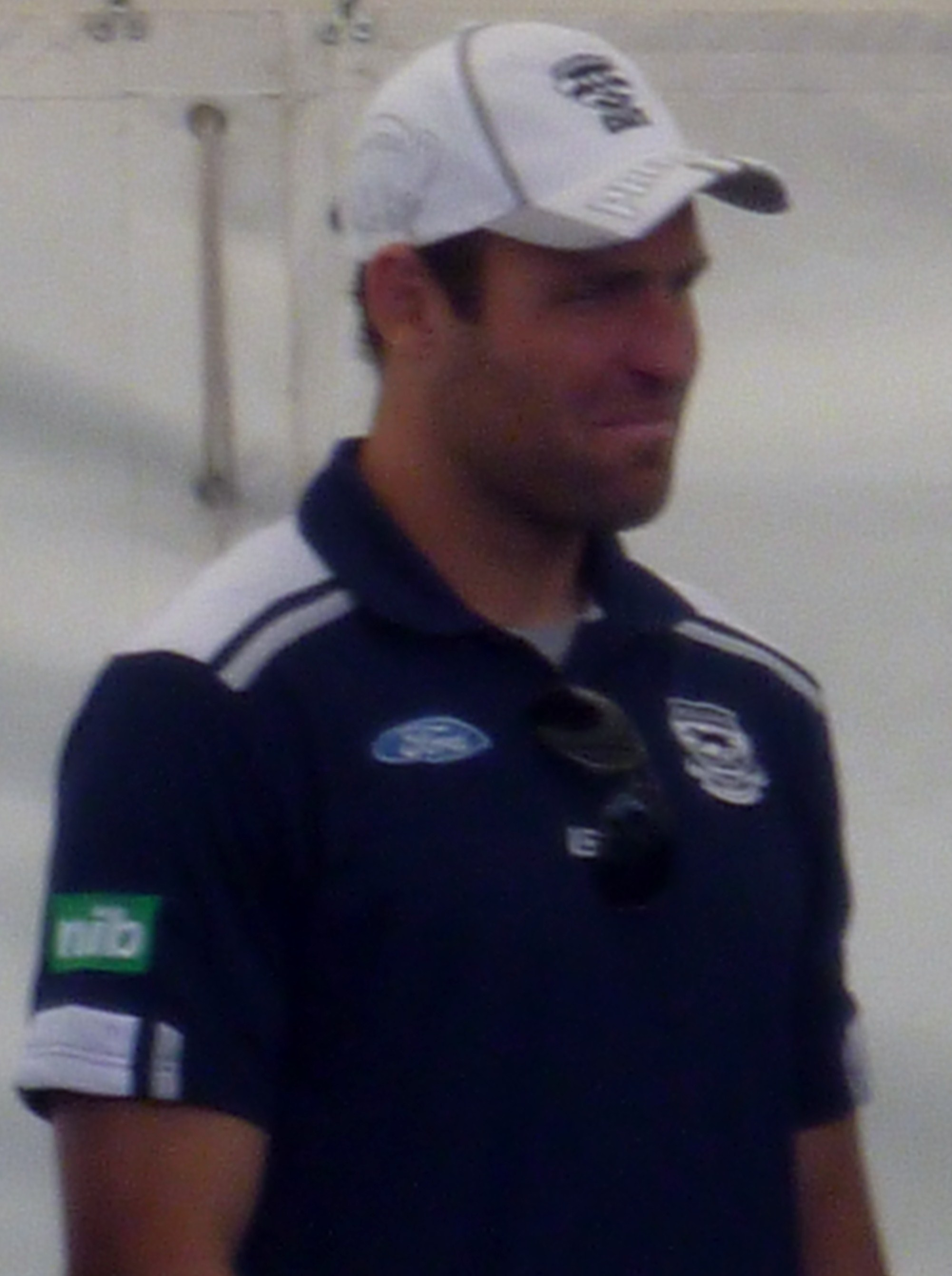
- Brad Ottens in 2011

Personal information
- Full name: Bradley Ottens
- Born: 25 January 1980 (age 46); South Australia
- Original team: Glenelg Football Club/Richmond
- Draft: 2nd overall, 1997; Richmond
- Height: 204 cm (6 ft 8 in)
- Weight: 106 kg (234 lb)
- Position: Ruckman / Full-forward

Playing career^{1}
Years	Club	Games (Goals)
1998–2004	Richmond	129 (152)
2005–2011	Geelong	116 (109)
Total		245 (261)
- ^{1} Playing statistics correct to the end of 2011.

Career highlights
- AFL: 3× AFL premiership player: 2007, 2009, 2011; All-Australian (2001); AFL NAB Cup Pre-Season Premiership Player (2006); Mark of the Year (2006); International Rules Series (2001)

Brad Ottens (born 25 January 1980) is a former professional Australian rules footballer who played for the Geelong Football Club and Richmond Football Club in the Australian Football League (AFL).

== Early life ==
Ottens was born in South Australia, but raised on a cattle station near Katherine, Northern Territory. He moved to South Australia to board at Immanuel College, Adelaide where he began to play Australian rules. He later played senior football with the Glenelg Football Club where he became a standout.

Ottens was selected at pick 2 in the 1997 AFL draft by the Richmond.

== AFL career ==
=== Richmond: 1998–2004 ===
Ottens made his debut in 1998, rising to prominence with Richmond as a strong overhead marker, with an accurate and long kick for goal. He was also a part-time ruckman. However a season ending ACL knee injury (and reconstruction) posed a major setback to his career. In subsequent years he struggled to regain his form. He kicked 47 of his goals in 2001 for Richmond

=== Geelong: 2005–2011 ===
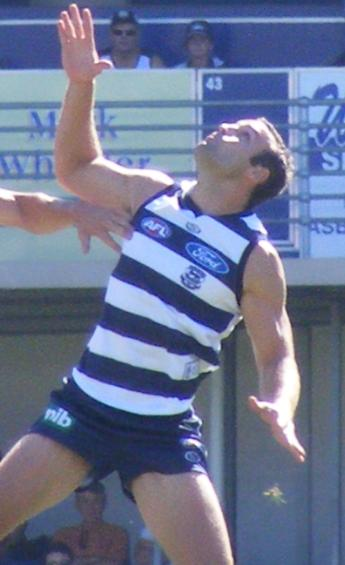
Ottens playing for Geelong in 2008.

In search of a ruckman and key forward target, Geelong picked up Ottens in a trade for the 2005 season. After debuting in Round 1, and becoming the one thousandth player to play a game for Geelong, he again struggled to have a major impact in the first year at his new club. He was the subject of an infamous post-match press conference by Mark Thompson in 2005. Here Thompson defended Ottens by saying "For some silly reason, you people want to assassinate him. It's just rubbish. You people, all of you, ALL OF YOU, leave him alone!" Some see it as a defining moment for Brad.

Since then Ottens has been Geelong's preferred first ruckman. In 2006 Ottens showed signs of improvement, particularly in the ruck. He also took the Mark of the Year in round 5 against Sydney. He played all 22 games in 2006.

The week after Geelong's exit from the 2006 AFL season, Ottens was involved in a drink driving incident which saw him have his licence cancelled for 11 months.

In 2007 Ottens was in near career best form. He played a majority of the season as Geelong's main ruckman rather than as a forward where he had played mostly since joining the club. During the Cats' five-point preliminary final win against Collingwood Ottens was voted best-on-ground after giving a game-winning performance in the ruck. The following week he capped off a stellar season, among the best players in his side's record breaking grand final victory over Port Adelaide. He noted that it was the highlight of his career.

Despite missing most of 2009 with injuries, Ottens made a late comeback and played in another Geelong premiership side. An injury interrupted season in 2010 resulted in a muted effort for the club's disappointing 2010 AFL finals series. In the 2011 AFL season a relatively injury free Ottens had led to him being able to improve his output on recent years. He retired at the end of the 2011 season.

== Statistics ==
Legend
G	Goals	K	Kicks	D	Disposals	T	Tackles
B	Behinds	H	Handballs	M	Marks	H/O	Hit-outs

Season	Team	No.	Games	Totals								Averages (per game)							
Season	Team	No.	Games	G	B	K	H	D	M	T	H/O	G	B	K	H	D	M	T	H/O
1998	Richmond	5	12	2	2	30	33	63	29	5	70	0.2	0.2	2.5	2.8	5.3	2.4	0.4	5.8
1999	Richmond	5	22	21	15	110	96	206	82	9	266	1.0	0.7	5.0	4.4	9.4	3.7	0.4	12.1
2000	Richmond	5	21	30	12	174	113	287	117	20	317	1.4	0.6	8.3	5.4	13.7	5.6	1.0	15.1
2001	Richmond	5	24	46	21	230	124	354	166	44	321	1.9	0.9	9.6	5.2	14.8	6.9	1.8	13.4
2002	Richmond	5	20	27	16	160	114	274	102	41	377	1.4	0.8	8.0	5.7	13.7	5.1	2.1	18.9
2003	Richmond	5	12	10	5	90	93	183	71	34	240	0.8	0.4	7.5	7.8	15.3	5.9	2.8	20.0
2004	Richmond	5	18	16	8	102	129	231	99	38	424	0.9	0.4	5.7	7.2	12.8	5.5	2.1	23.6
2005	Geelong	6	15	23	12	81	88	169	69	29	172	1.5	0.8	5.4	5.9	11.3	4.6	1.9	11.5
2006	Geelong	6	22	26	20	139	104	243	104	45	319	1.2	0.9	6.3	4.7	11.0	4.7	2.0	14.5
2007	Geelong	6	22	21	16	133	163	296	115	69	417	1.0	0.7	6.0	7.4	13.5	5.2	3.1	19.0
2008	Geelong	6	16	14	8	73	136	209	72	52	325	0.9	0.5	4.6	8.5	13.1	4.5	3.3	20.3
2009	Geelong	6	6	2	5	28	38	66	21	21	89	0.3	0.8	4.7	6.3	11.0	3.5	3.5	14.8
2010	Geelong	6	15	8	5	40	123	163	40	54	298	0.5	0.3	2.7	8.2	10.9	2.7	3.6	19.9
2011	Geelong	6	20	15	9	87	183	270	73	70	500	0.8	0.5	4.4	9.2	13.5	3.7	3.5	25.0
Career			245	261	154	1477	1537	3014	1160	531	4135	1.1	0.6	6.0	6.3	12.3	4.7	2.2	16.9

== Tribunal history ==
Season	Round	Charge category (level)	Victim	Result	Verdict	Ref(s)
2001	2	Melee involvement	—	Guilty (accepted fine)	$2,000 fine

Key:

- PS – Pre-season competition
- EF – Elimination final
- QF – Qualifying final
- SF – Semi-final
- PF – Preliminary final
- GF – Grand final
