= 2019 Geelong Football Club season =

Football club season

Geelong Football Club
2019 season
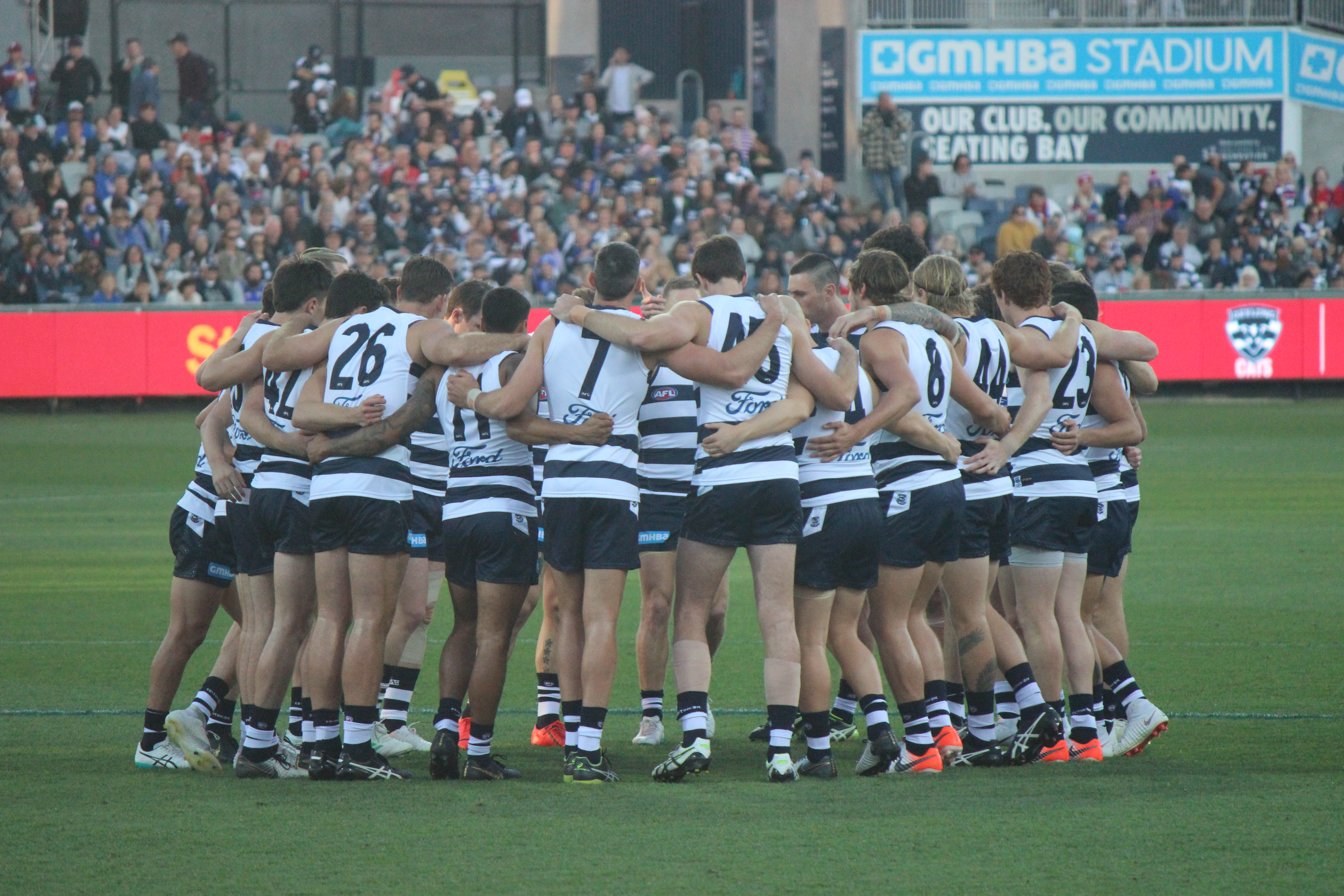
- Team huddle in round 9, 2019
- President: Colin Carter
- Coach: Chris Scott (9th season)
- Captains: Joel Selwood (8th season)
- Home ground: GMHBA Stadium
- AFL season: 16 wins, 6 losses (1st)
- Finals series: Preliminary final
- Best and Fairest: Patrick Dangerfield
- Leading goalkicker: Tom Hawkins (56)
- Average home attendance: 33,405
- Club membership: 65,063

The 2019 season was the Geelong Football Club's 120th in the Australian Football League (AFL). It was the ninth season under senior coach Chris Scott, with Joel Selwood appointed as club captain for an eight successive year. Geelong (known as the Cats) participated in the 2019 JLT Community Series as part of their pre-season schedule, and the club's regular season began on 22 March against Collingwood at the Melbourne Cricket Ground (MCG). The Cats finished the home-and-away season with a 16–6 win–loss record and placed first on the league's ladder, earning Geelong their first minor premiership since the 2008 season. Progressing to the third week of the 2019 finals series, Geelong was subsequently defeated in a preliminary final against Richmond by 19 points, eliminating them before the 2019 AFL Grand Final.

Patrick Dangerfield was named Geelong's best and fairest player, polling 268 votes for the Carji Greeves Medal ahead of second-placed Tim Kelly on 259.5 votes. It was Dangerfield's third Carji Greeves Medal, having previously won the award the 2016 and 2017 seasons. Tom Hawkins was the club's leading goalkicker for the eighth successive season, scoring 56 goals. Dangerfield, Kelly and Hawkins were all selected in the 2019 All-Australian team, alongside Geelong teammate Tom Stewart. Kelly also received the AFL Coaches Association's Best Young Player award. The Cats also fielded a reserves team in the Victorian Football League (VFL), where they were defeated in an elimination final by Port Melbourne.

== Background ==
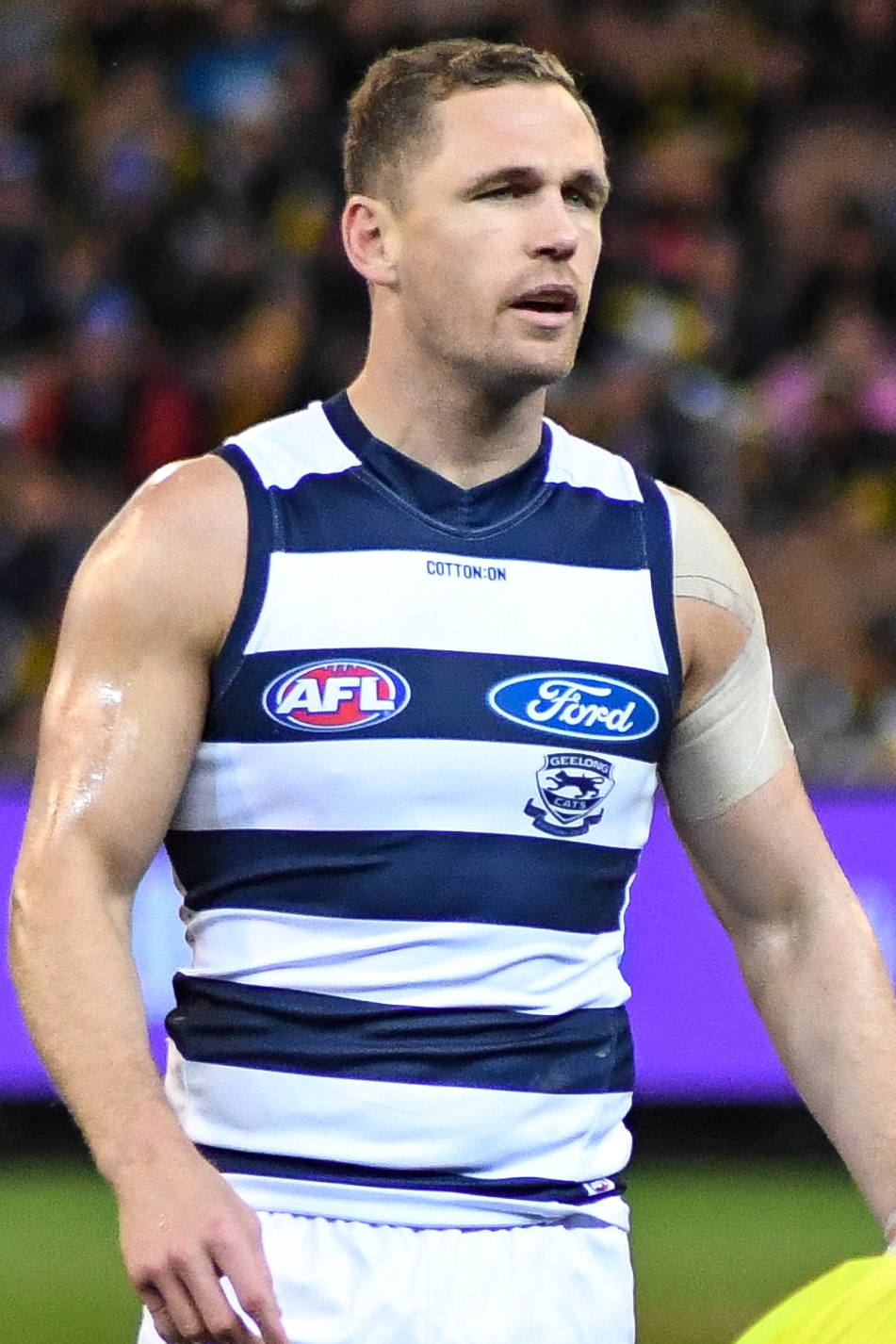
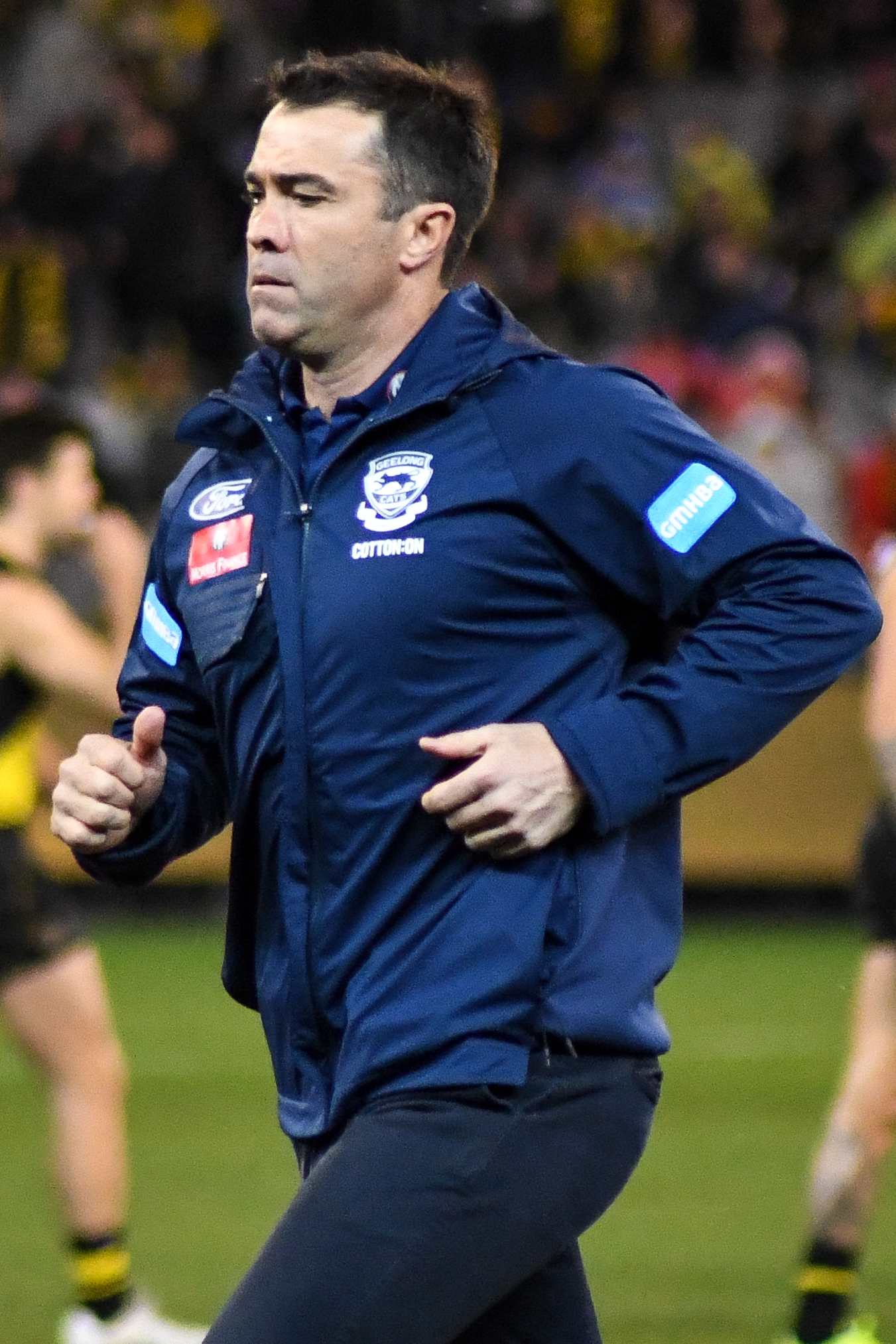
Joel Selwood (captain) and Chris Scott (coach)

Chris Scott continued as the club's senior coach for a ninth season, after signing a contract in August 2018 extending his tenure until the end of the 2022 season. The Cats had four assistant coaches this season, each responsible for specific positions within games: James Rahilly (forward line), Matthew Knights and Nigel Lappin (midfield), Matthew Scarlett (back line). Corey Enright was also a member of the coaching panel, fulfilling the role of development coach for Geelong's young players.

Joel Selwood was appointed the club's captain for an eighth successive season, with Patrick Dangerfield and Harry Taylor sharing the role of vice-captain. They were supported by a leadership group made up by teammates Mark Blicavs, Mitch Duncan and Zach Tuohy, who all remained in the group from the prior season, along with new addition Tom Stewart.

Ford Australia was the major sponsor of the club for the 2019 season, continuing a long-running deal that started in 1925. GMHBA was the naming rights sponsor for Geelong's home ground Kardinia Park, continuing a ten-year deal signed in October 2017 for the venue to be known as GMHBA Stadium. The Cats were scheduled to play nine of their eleven home games at GMHBA Stadium for the season's home-and-away fixture; the Melbourne Cricket Ground (MCG) hosted the club's remaining two home games against Essendon and Hawthorn. Geelong signed up 65,063 members and had an average home ground attendance of 33,405 spectators across the season.

== Playing list ==
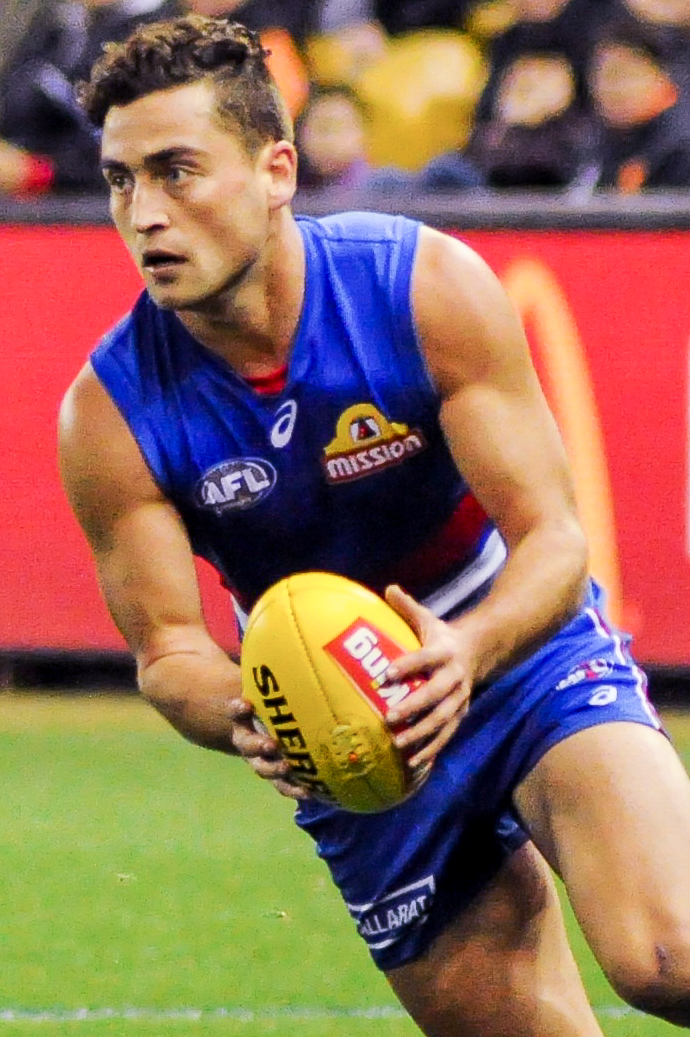
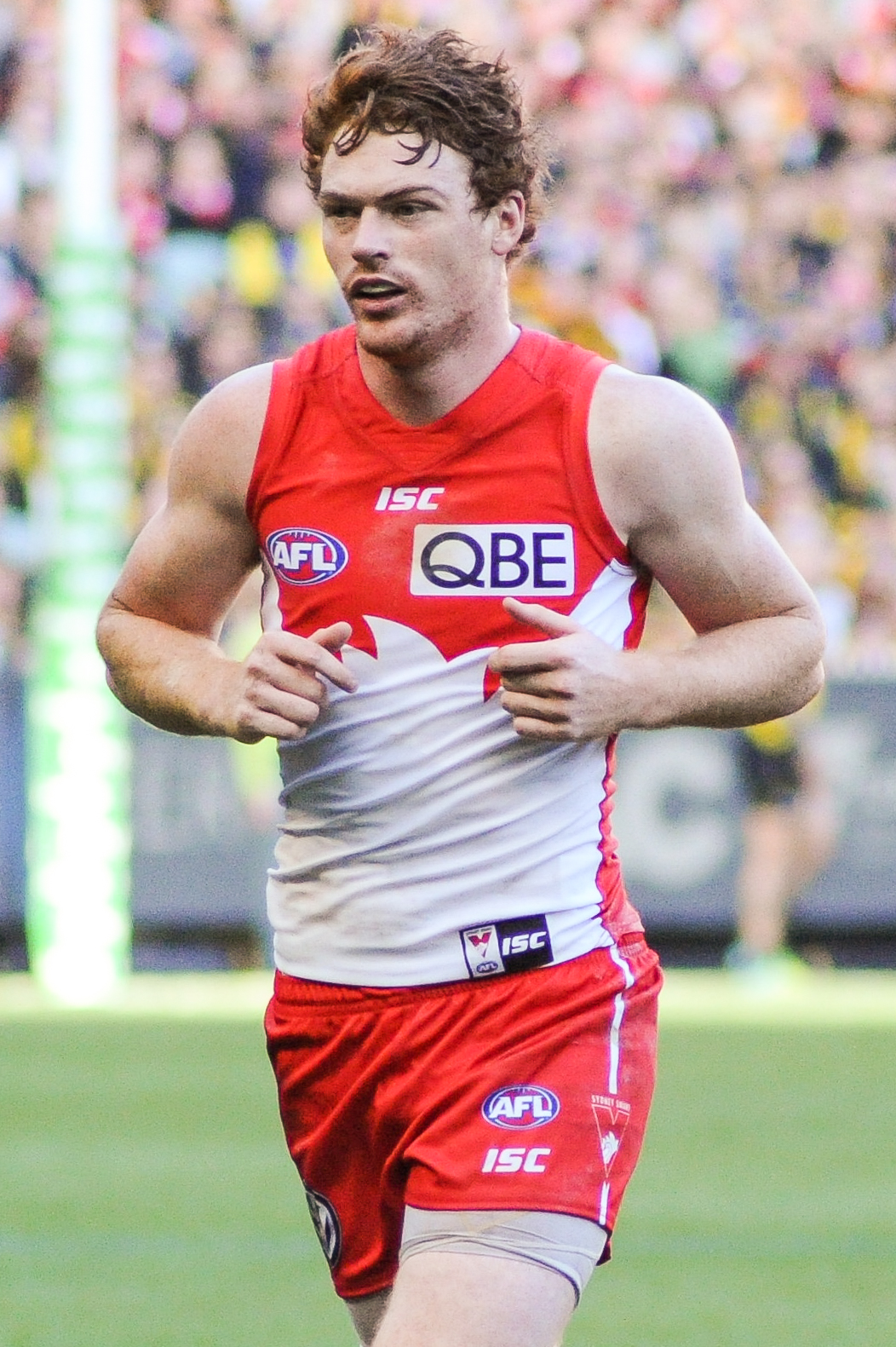
Luke Dahlhaus (via free agency) and Gary Rohan (via trade) joined Geelong in the off–season.

=== Changes ===
At the end of the 2018 season, Geelong delisted Aaron Black, Ryan Gardner, Cory Gregson, Daniel Menzel and Jordan Murdoch and Timm House from their primary list; the club also removed Stewart Crameri and Matthew Hayball from their rookie list. Menzel and Murdoch were later recruited by Sydney and Gold Coast respectively as delisted free agents. Conversely, rookies Jack Henry and Mark O'Connor were both upgraded to the Cats' senior list for 2019.

Geelong were involved in six trades during the annual trade period, the first of which involved the Cats exchanging Lincoln McCarthy (along with picks 55 and 59 in the upcoming national draft) to Brisbane for picks 43 and 62. Geelong used these picks to secure Nathan Kreuger from Carlton (Note: Kreuger was pre-listed by Carlton after they were granted early access to recruit state–league players prior to the national draft.) and Gary Rohan from Sydney respectively. The club then traded George Horlin-Smith to Gold Coast for pick 59, and Jackson Thurlow to Sydney for pick 70; pick 59 was later on-traded (along with pick 60) to Collingwood in return for pick 51. Additionally, Luke Dahlhaus joined the club as an unrestricted free agent.

Six players were drafted by the Cats in the 2018 national draft: Jordan Clark (pick 15), Ben Jarvis (48), Jacob Kennerley (50), Darcy Fort (65), Jake Tarca (68) and Oscar Brownless (74)—a father–son selection. Geelong also selected Tom Atkins (pick 11) in the rookie draft; Atkins had been playing with the club's Victorian Football League (VFL) team since 2014. Gaelic footballer Stefan Okunbor was recruited to the club from Ireland as a Category B rookie, and was joined by Blake Schlensog, a graduate from Geelong's "Next Generation Academy".

Deletions from playing list
Player	Reason	Ref.
George Horlin-Smith	Traded to Gold Coast	
Lincoln McCarthy	Traded to Brisbane Lions	
Jackson Thurlow	Traded to Sydney	
Aaron Black	Delisted	
Stewart Crameri	Delisted	
Ryan Gardner	Delisted	
Cory Gregson	Delisted	
Matthew Hayball	Delisted	
Timm House	Delisted	
Daniel Menzel	Delisted	
Jordan Murdoch	Delisted	

Additions to playing list
Player	Acquired	Ref.
Luke Dahlhaus	Unrestricted free agent (from Western Bulldogs)	
Nathan Kreuger	Traded from Carlton (pre-draft selection)	
Gary Rohan	Traded from Sydney	
Jack Henry	Rookie elevation	
Mark O'Connor	Rookie elevation	
Jordan Clark	No. 15, 2018 national draft	
Ben Jarvis	No. 48, 2018 national draft	
Jacob Kennerley	No. 50, 2018 national draft	
Darcy Fort	No. 65, 2018 national draft	
Jake Tarca	No. 68, 2018 national draft	
Oscar Brownless	No. 74, 2018 national draft (father–son)	
Tom Atkins	No. 11, 2019 rookie draft	
Stefan Okunbor	Category B rookie	
Blake Schlensog	Category B rookie	

=== Statistics ===
Geelong utilised 34 players from their playing list this season; of these players, five played in their first AFL game: Tom Atkins, Jordan Clark, Charlie Constable, Darcy Fort and Gryan Miers. Additionally, Luke Dahlhaus and Gary Rohan played their first games for the Cats, having previously played for Western Bulldogs and Sydney respectively. There was four players who played in all 25 of the club's games. Tom Hawkins was the club's leading goalkicker for the eighth successive season, scoring 56 goals.

Playing list and statistics
Player	No.	Games	Goals	Behinds	Kicks	Handballs	Disposals	Marks	Tackles	Milestone(s)
Ryan Abbott	45	1	1	0	5	6	11	3	4	
Gary Ablett	4	24	34	18	293	189	482	89	108	
Tom Atkins^	30	23	5	4	122	162	284	36	110	AFL debut (round 1)
Jed Bews	24	12	3	3	94	35	129	33	30	
Mark Blicavs	46	25	0	3	182	154	336	124	90	150th game (round 18)
Oscar Brownless	20	0	—N/a	—N/a	—N/a	—N/a	—N/a	—N/a	—N/a	
Wylie Buzza	12	0	—N/a	—N/a	—N/a	—N/a	—N/a	—N/a	—N/a	
Jordan Clark	6	18	11	8	171	78	249	76	48	AFL debut (round 1)
Nakia Cockatoo	5	0	—N/a	—N/a	—N/a	—N/a	—N/a	—N/a	—N/a	
Charlie Constable	18	7	5	2	63	87	150	31	26	AFL debut (round 1)
Jordan Cunico	31	0	—N/a	—N/a	—N/a	—N/a	—N/a	—N/a	—N/a	
Luke Dahlhaus	40	24	14	16	171	262	433	71	115	Geelong debut (round 1)
Patrick Dangerfield	35	24	27	18	352	298	650	119	104	
Mitch Duncan	22	23	20	6	340	241	581	172	68	200th game (round 21)
Lachie Fogarty	13	2	0	0	10	9	19	3	10	
Darcy Fort	28	3	5	0	16	7	23	6	5	AFL debut (round 9)
Cameron Guthrie	29	20	10	4	191	177	368	70	98	150th game (round 14)
Zach Guthrie^	39	1	0	0	11	2	13	5	1	
Tom Hawkins	26	24	56	32	203	106	309	126	37	250th game (round 19)
Lachie Henderson	25	6	1	0	53	22	75	29	8	
Jack Henry	38	23	0	4	175	66	241	97	34	
Ben Jarvis	10	0	—N/a	—N/a	—N/a	—N/a	—N/a	—N/a	—N/a	
Jamaine Jones^	41	0	—N/a	—N/a	—N/a	—N/a	—N/a	—N/a	—N/a	
Tim Kelly	11	25	24	18	381	254	635	89	106	
Jacob Kennerley	21	0	—N/a	—N/a	—N/a	—N/a	—N/a	—N/a	—N/a	
Jake Kolodjashnij	8	23	0	1	167	86	253	109	33	
Nathan Kreuger	15	0	—N/a	—N/a	—N/a	—N/a	—N/a	—N/a	—N/a	
Sam Menegola	27	12	3	6	127	101	228	58	38	
Gryan Miers	32	25	28	19	229	156	385	98	48	AFL debut (round 1)
Quinton Narkle	19	6	5	4	59	44	103	14	18	
Mark O'Connor	42	23	1	0	195	127	322	104	61	
Stefan Okunbor^{#}	43	0	—N/a	—N/a	—N/a	—N/a	—N/a	—N/a	—N/a	
Brandan Parfitt	3	20	4	4	190	174	364	39	105	50th game (round 22)
James Parsons	34	4	3	2	45	17	62	16	9	
Esava Ratugolea	17	20	15	15	103	72	175	53	46	
Gary Rohan	23	19	25	11	125	37	162	37	34	Geelong debut (round 1)
Blake Schlensog^{#}	36	0	—N/a	—N/a	—N/a	—N/a	—N/a	—N/a	—N/a	
Joel Selwood	14	23	6	6	275	214	489	79	94	
Scott Selwood	16	2	1	1	21	17	38	8	12	
Sam Simpson^	37	0	—N/a	—N/a	—N/a	—N/a	—N/a	—N/a	—N/a	
Zac Smith	9	3	0	0	16	21	37	7	8	
Rhys Stanley	1	18	7	7	138	112	250	53	46	
Tom Stewart	44	25	0	2	473	107	580	185	42	50th game (round 7)
Jake Tarca	33	0	—N/a	—N/a	—N/a	—N/a	—N/a	—N/a	—N/a	
Harry Taylor	7	24	3	2	186	145	331	114	40	250th game (round 14)
Zach Tuohy	2	18	3	10	252	98	350	78	17	

Key
^	Denotes player who was on the club's standard rookie list, and therefore eligible for senior selection.
#	Denotes Category B rookie where player needed to be elevated to club's senior list during this season to be eligible for senior selection.

== Season summary ==
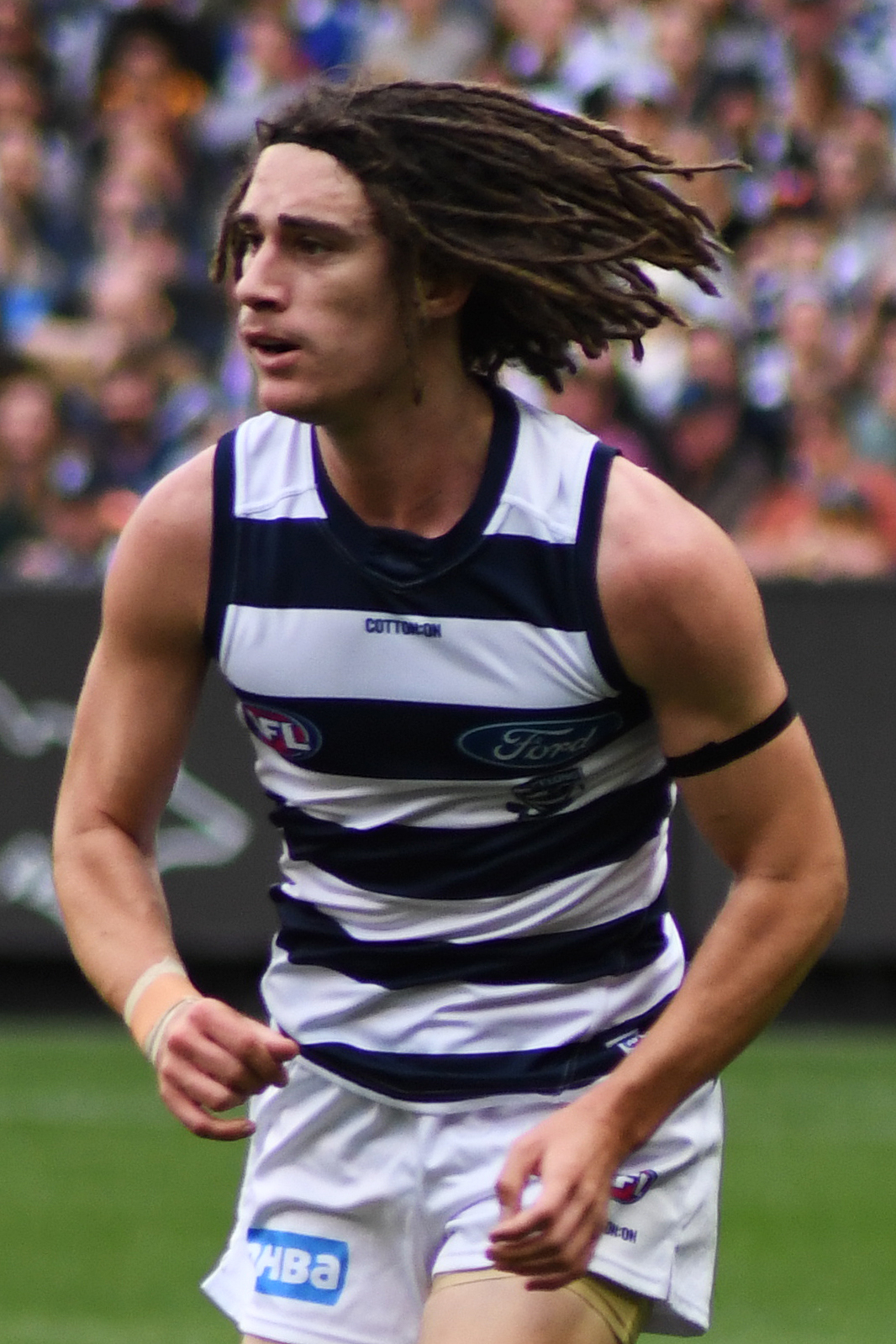
Gryan Miers played his debut game in round one, and won Geelong's Best Young Player award for the season.

The fixture for the 2019 season was confirmed by the AFL in November 2018, with clubs playing 22 matches during the regular season and receiving a mid-season bye. Geelong participated in the 2019 JLT Community Series as part of their pre-season schedule, playing in two games against West Coast and Essendon.

Geelong began the regular season on 22 March against Collingwood at the MCG; despite featuring six new players in their team lineup, the Cats narrowly won the game by seven points. This successful start to the season continued the following week, with Geelong winning against Melbourne by 80 points; both Collingwood and Melbourne reached the preliminary finals in the previous season. After an away win against Adelaide in round 3, the Cats recorded their first loss for the season against Greater Western Sydney the next week. Playing against arch-rival Hawthorn on Easter Monday, Geelong overcame match-day injuries to midfielder Brandan Parfitt and ruckman Esava Ratugolea to post a 23-point win. This was the first of eight consecutive wins for the Cats, including a 58-point victory over reigning premier West Coast in round 6. Geelong's score of 21.7 (133) against Western Bulldogs in round 9 was their highest of the season, with the Cats recording eleven individual goalkickers in their win. Travelling to the MCG again in round 12, the Cats defeated Richmond by 67 points; the Tigers had won 26 of their 28 previous games at the venue.

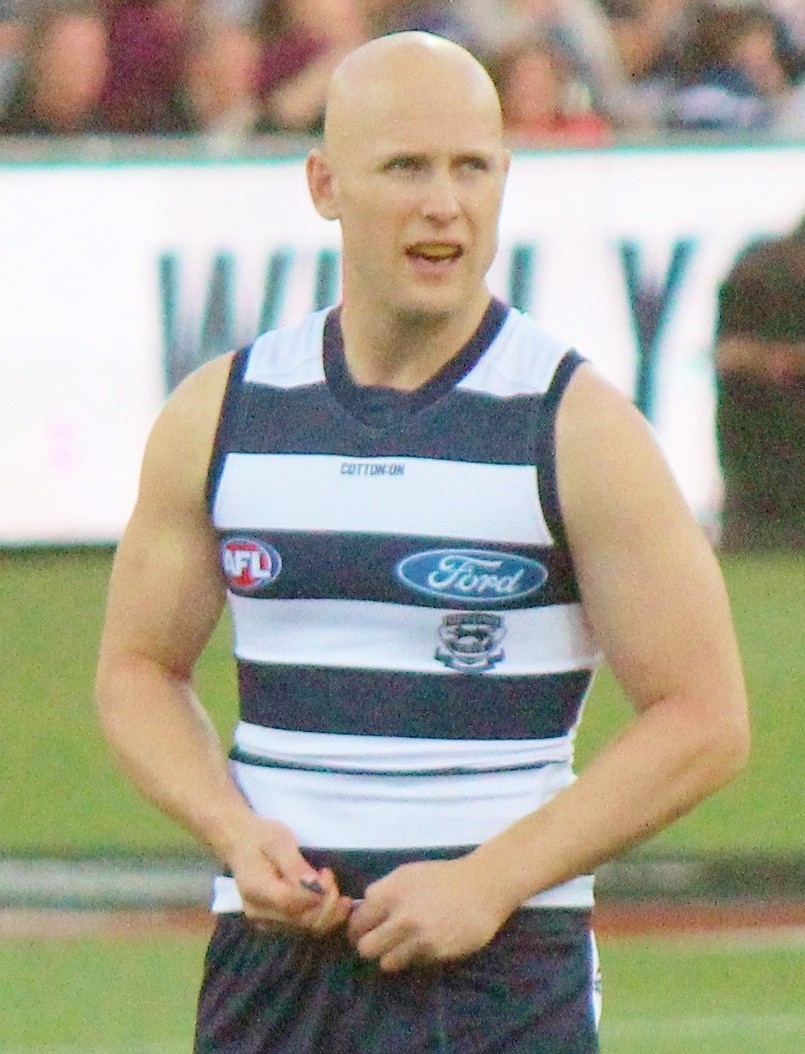
Gary Ablett in 2019.

The Cats' early season success was somewhat marred by a string of on-field incidents by Cats' player Gary Ablett, beginning when Ablett was offered a one-match suspension for striking Essendon midfielder Dylan Shiel with a forearm to the head in the Cats' round 7 win. After successfully appealing the suspension at the AFL Tribunal, Ablett was involved in an almost identical incident the following week with North Melbourne's Sam Wright, but was not penalised. A fortnight later, Ablett was suspended for the first time in his 331-game career when he accepted a one-match suspension for punching the jaw of Gold Coast midfielder Anthony Miles. Heading into their bye in round 13, Geelong were placed first on the league's ladder with an 11–1 win–loss record; notably the Cats had played each team that had qualified for the previous season's final series.

Geelong were defeated by Port Adelaide in their first match following their week off; it was the eighth consecutive year the Cats had lost after a mid-season bye. This loss began a pattern where Geelong failed to record successive wins for the remainder of the home-and-away season, winning just five of ten matches. All but one of the Cats' wins was at GMHBA Stadium; their sole away victory was against Sydney at the Sydney Cricket Ground in round 19, with Tom Hawkins scoring five goals in his 250th game. Despite this inconsistent form, the Cats's still finished the regular season with a 16–6 win–loss record and placed first on the league's ladder, qualifying for the 2019 finals series and earning Geelong their first minor premiership since the 2008 season.

Leading up to the finals series, Geelong had won just three of their 12 finals since their premiership win in 2011. Geelong continued this poor finals form in their qualifying final against Collingwood, losing by 10 points. Geelong defeated West Coast by 20 points in the following week's semi-final, progressing to the third week of the finals series as a result. Geelong were subsequently defeated in a preliminary final against Richmond by 19 points, eliminating them before the 2019 AFL Grand Final. It was the first time since the introduction of the final eight system that both of the regular season's top-two teams failed to reach the Grand Final, after second-placed Brisbane lost their semi-final against Greater Western Sydney.

=== Results ===
Key
H	Home game
A	Away game
QF	Qualifying final
SF	Semi-final
PF	Preliminary final

Table of season results
Round	Date	Result	Score			Opponent	Score			Ground		Attendance	Ladder
Round	Date	Result	G	B	T	Opponent	G	B	T	Ground		Attendance	Ladder
1	22 March	Won	10	12	72	Collingwood	9	11	65	Melbourne Cricket Ground	A	78,017	8th
2	30 March	Won	20	6	126	Melbourne	6	10	46	GMHBA Stadium	H	27,561	1st
3	4 April	Won	14	15	99	Adelaide	10	15	75	Adelaide Oval	A	45,631	1st
4	13 April	Lost	11	9	75	Greater Western Sydney	11	13	79	GMHBA Stadium	H	28,780	1st
5	22 April	Won	17	11	113	Hawthorn	13	12	90	Melbourne Cricket Ground	A	66,347	1st
6	28 April	Won	15	14	104	West Coast	7	4	46	GMHBA Stadium	H	28,085	1st
7	5 May	Won	13	8	86	Essendon	7	12	54	Melbourne Cricket Ground	H	63,527	1st
8	12 May	Won	16	8	104	North Melbourne	11	14	80	Marvel Stadium	A	21,156	1st
9	18 May	Won	21	7	133	Western Bulldogs	13	11	89	GMHBA Stadium	H	31,373	1st
10	25 May	Won	13	13	91	Gold Coast	9	10	64	Metricon Stadium	A	13,144	1st
11	1 June	Won	13	7	85	Sydney	8	15	63	GMHBA Stadium	H	29,021	1st
12	7 June	Won	16	8	104	Richmond	5	7	37	Melbourne Cricket Ground	A	65,214	1st
13	Bye												1st
14	22 June	Lost	8	8	56	Port Adelaide	9	13	67	Adelaide Oval	A	37,726	1st
15	28 June	Won	14	12	96	Adelaide	10	9	69	GMHBA Stadium	H	28,108	1st
16	6 July	Lost	7	13	55	Western Bulldogs	10	11	71	Marvel Stadium	A	35,641	1st
17	13 July	Won	12	12	84	St Kilda	8	9	57	GMHBA Stadium	H	24,035	1st
18	21 July	Lost	8	13	61	Hawthorn	12	13	85	Melbourne Cricket Ground	H	53,636	1st
19	28 July	Won	16	11	107	Sydney	12	8	80	Sydney Cricket Ground	A	32,911	1st
20	3 August	Lost	9	7	61	Fremantle	14	11	95	Optus Stadium	A	36,310	1st
21	10 August	Won	9	15	69	North Melbourne	1	8	14	GMHBA Stadium	H	21,664	1st
22	17 August	Lost	10	14	74	Brisbane Lions	10	15	75	The Gabba	A	35,608	2nd
23	24 August	Won	19	15	129	Carlton	8	13	61	GMHBA Stadium	H	31,669	1st
QF	6 September	Lost	7	9	51	Collingwood	9	7	61	Melbourne Cricket Ground	H	93,436	—N/a
SF	13 September	Won	13	10	88	West Coast	10	8	68	Melbourne Cricket Ground	H	51,813	—N/a
PF	20 September	Lost (Note: Geelong were eliminated from the finals series as a result of their preliminary final loss to Richmond.)	9	12	66	Richmond	12	13	85	Melbourne Cricket Ground	A	94,423	—N/a

=== Ladder ===
Pos	Team	Pld	W	L	D	PF	PA	PP	Pts	Qualification
1	Geelong	22	16	6	0	1984	1462	135.7	64	Finals series
2	Brisbane Lions	22	16	6	0	2004	1694	118.3	64	Finals series
3	Richmond (P)	22	16	6	0	1892	1664	113.7	64	Finals series
4	Collingwood	22	15	7	0	1885	1601	117.7	60	Finals series
5	West Coast	22	15	7	0	1902	1691	112.5	60	Finals series
6	Greater Western Sydney	22	13	9	0	1926	1669	115.4	52	Finals series
7	Western Bulldogs	22	12	10	0	1941	1810	107.2	48	Finals series
8	Essendon	22	12	10	0	1702	1784	95.4	48	Finals series
9	Hawthorn	22	11	11	0	1742	1602	108.7	44	
10	Port Adelaide	22	11	11	0	1806	1714	105.4	44	
11	Adelaide	22	10	12	0	1776	1761	100.9	40	
12	North Melbourne	22	10	12	0	1824	1834	99.5	40	
13	Fremantle	22	9	13	0	1579	1718	91.9	36	
14	St Kilda	22	9	13	0	1645	1961	83.9	36	
15	Sydney	22	8	14	0	1706	1746	97.7	32	
16	Carlton	22	7	15	0	1609	1905	84.5	28	
17	Melbourne	22	5	17	0	1569	1995	78.6	20	
18	Gold Coast	22	3	19	0	1351	2232	60.5	12	

Source: AFL Tables
Rules for classification: 1) points; 2) percentage; 3) number of points for.
(P) Premiers

== Reserves team ==
The club's reserves team, participating in the VFL, was coached by Shane O'Bree for a fourth season. Aaron Black and James Tsitas were appointed co-captains, replacing Tom Atkins after he was rookie-listed in the senior team.

The reserves team finished the regular season with a 11–7 win–loss record and placed sixth on the league's ladder, qualifying for the finals series as a result. Geelong was subsequently defeated in an elimination final by Port Melbourne.

== Awards ==
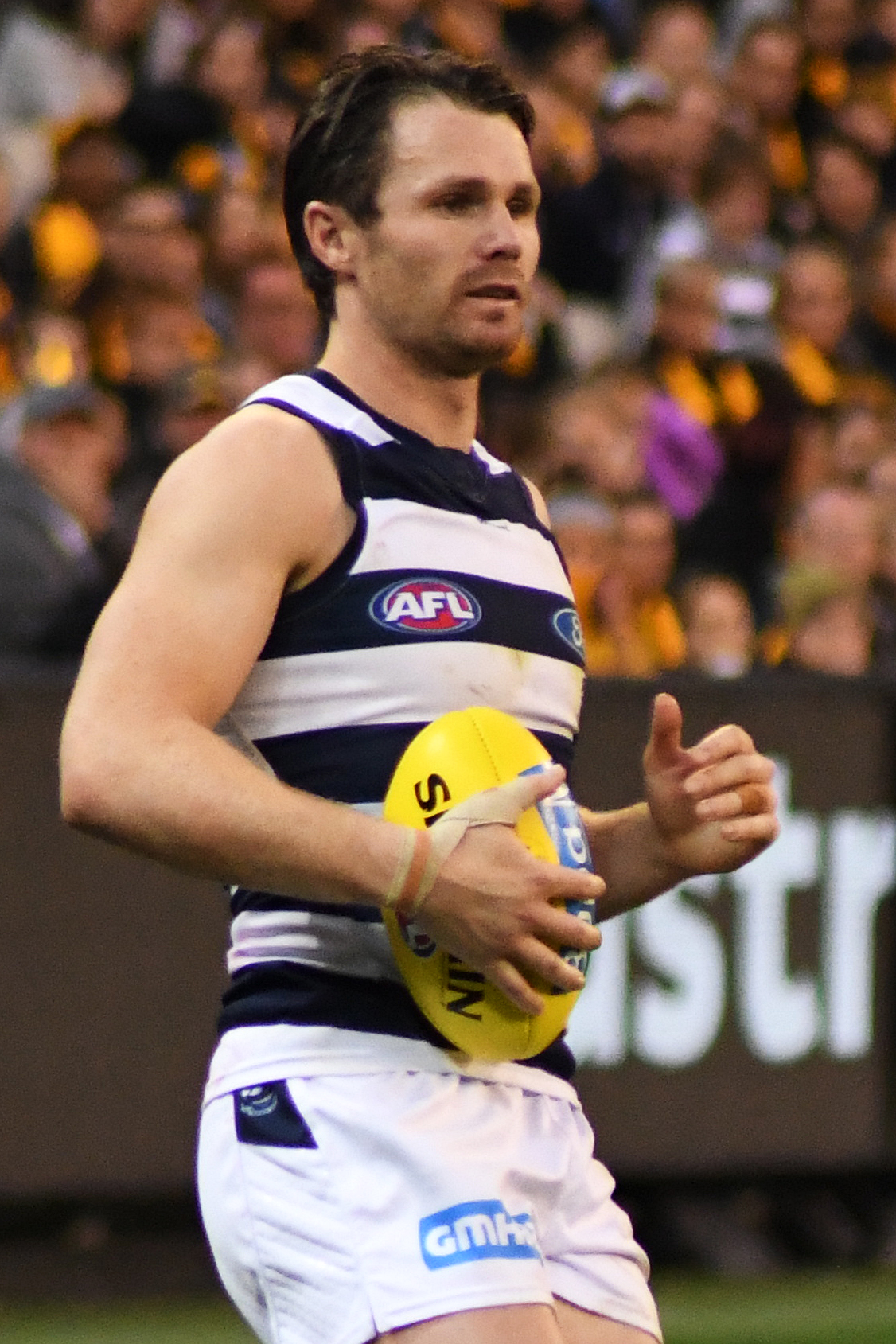
Patrick Dangerfield won the Carji Greeves Medal for 2019.

Geelong held their player awards night at Crown Palladium on 3 October, with former player Doug Wade presenting the club's best and fairest award, the Carji Greeves Medal. The award was won by Patrick Dangerfield, who received 268 votes; runner-up Tim Kelly polled 259.5 votes, with Tom Stewart in third place on 151 votes. It was Dangerfield's third Carji Greeves Medal, having previously won the award in 2016 and 2017. Additionally, Scott Selwood received the Tom Harley Award, for best representing the club's values, and Tom Hawkins was presented with the Community Champion award. Gryan Miers was named the club's Best Young Player.

Dangerfield, Kelly, Hawkins and Stewart were all selected in the honorary 2019 All-Australian team. Teammates Gary Ablett and Mark Blicavs were initially shortlisted but ultimately not selected in the final team. Kelly also received the AFL Coaches Association's Best Young Player award. Geelong had three players, Charlie Constable (round two), Miers (round eight) and Jordan Clark (round fifteen), who were nominated for the season's Rising Star award.

Table of awards received by Geelong players
Award	Awarded by	Player	Result	Ref.
All-Australian team	Australian Football League	Gary Ablett	Shortlisted	
All-Australian team	Australian Football League	Mark Blicavs	Shortlisted	
All-Australian team	Australian Football League	Patrick Dangerfield	Selected	
All-Australian team	Australian Football League	Tom Hawkins	Selected	
All-Australian team	Australian Football League	Tim Kelly	Selected	
All-Australian team	Australian Football League	Tom Stewart	Selected	
AFL Rising Star	Australian Football League	Jordan Clark	Nominated	
AFL Rising Star	Australian Football League	Charlie Constable	Nominated	
AFL Rising Star	Australian Football League	Gryan Miers	Nominated	
Leigh Matthews Trophy for Most Valuable Player	AFL Players Association	Mark Blicavs	Nominated	
Leigh Matthews Trophy for Most Valuable Player	AFL Players Association	Tom Hawkins	Nominated	
Leigh Matthews Trophy for Most Valuable Player	AFL Players Association	Tim Kelly	Nominated	
Best Captain	AFL Players Association	Joel Selwood	Nominated	
Robert Rose Award for Most Courageous Player	AFL Players Association	Joel Selwood	Nominated	
Best First Year Player	AFL Players Association	Jordan Clark	Nominated	
Best Young Player	AFL Coaches Association	Tim Kelly	Won	
Carji Greeves Medal	Geelong Football Club	Patrick Dangerfield	Won	
Best Young Player	Geelong Football Club	Gryan Miers	Won	
Tom Harley Award	Geelong Football Club	Scott Selwood	Won	
Community Champion	Geelong Football Club	Tom Hawkins	Won	
VFL best and fairest	Geelong Football Club	Sam Simpson	Won	

== See also ==
- 2019 Geelong Football Club women's season
