= 2020 Geelong Football Club season =

Geelong Football Club
2020 season
- President: Colin Carter
- Coach: Chris Scott (10th season)
- Captains: Joel Selwood (9th season)
- Home ground: GMHBA Stadium
- AFL season: 12 wins, 5 losses (4th)

The 2020 season was the Geelong Football Club's 121st season in the Australian Football League (AFL), the tenth with Chris Scott as senior coach and ninth with Joel Selwood as captain.

Geelong participated in the 2020 Marsh Community Series as part of its pre-season schedule, and the club's regular season began 21 March against Greater Western Sydney at GIANTS Stadium where they lost by 32 points.

== Overview ==
Chris Scott continued as the club's senior coach for a tenth season, and Joel Selwood continued as the club's captain for a ninth year. Harry Taylor stepped down from his position as co-vice-captain and was replaced by Mark Blicavs. In addition, Patrick Dangerfield retained his position as co-vice-captain. Furthermore, Mitch Duncan, Tom Stewart and Zach Tuohy kept their positions in the leadership group, with Mark O'Connor joining the group.

Coaching panel
Name	Position
Chris Scott	Senior coach
Simon Lloyd	Assistant coach (director of coaching)
James Rahilly	Assistant coach (forward line)
Matthew Knights	Assistant coach (midfield)
Matthew Scarlett	Assistant coach (back line)
Brad Ottens	Assistant coach (ruck)
Nigel Lappin	Assistant coach (development)
Corey Enright	Assistant coach (development)
Shaun Grigg	Assistant coach (development)
Shane O'Bree	VFL coach

Player leadership group
Name	Position
Joel Selwood	Captain
Mark Blicavs	Vice-captain
Patrick Dangerfield	Vice-captain
Mitch Duncan	Leadership group
Mark O'Connor	Leadership group
Tom Stewart	Leadership group
Zach Tuohy	Leadership group

Car manufacturer Ford Australia was the major sponsor for the 2020 season, making it the 96th year of the partnership. GMHBA the naming rights sponsor for Geelong's home ground Kardinia Park, continuing a ten-year deal signed in October 2017 for the venue to be known as GMHBA Stadium.

== Season summary ==
Key
H	Home game
A	Away game
QF	Qualifying final
SF	Semi-final
PF	Preliminary final
GF	Grand Final

Table of season results
Round	Date	Result	Score			Opponent	Score			Ground		Attendance	Ladder
Round	Date	Result	G	B	T	Opponent	G	B	T	Ground		Attendance	Ladder
1	21 March	Lost	11	7	73	Greater Western Sydney	17	3	105	Giants Stadium	A	0	14th
2	12 June	Won	17	6	108	Hawthorn	7	5	47	GMHBA Stadium	H	0	7th
3	20 June	Lost	11	11	77	Carlton	12	7	79	GMHBA Stadium	H	0	10th
4	28 June	Won	7	5	47	Melbourne	6	8	44	Melbourne Cricket Ground	A	0	6th
5	4 July	Won	13	11	89	Gold Coast	8	4	52	GMHBA Stadium	H	0	3rd
6	9 July	Won	11	7	73	Brisbane Lions	6	10	46	Sydney Cricket Ground	H	1,311	2nd
7	16 July	Lost	5	5	35	Collingwood	8	9	57	Optus Stadium	H	22,077	5th
8	27 July	Won	6	12	48	Fremantle	2	4	16	Optus Stadium	A	20,251	3rd
9	1 August	Lost	10	4	64	West Coast	11	7	73	Optus Stadium	A	26,211	6th
10	5 August	Won	13	12	90	North Melbourne	9	3	57	Gabba	H	2,282	5th
11	10 August	Won	14	9	93	St Kilda	4	10	34	Gabba	H	3,903	3rd
12	14 August	Won	14	7	91	Port Adelaide	4	7	31	Metricon Stadium	H	3,378	3rd
13	23 August	Won	9	11	65	Adelaide	5	7	37	Adelaide Oval	A	10,431	3rd
14	28 August	Won	10	12	72	Western Bulldogs	9	7	61	Metricon Stadium	A	2,156	2nd
15	Bye												4th
16	6 September	Won	17	6	108	Essendon	5	12	42	Gabba	H	5,011	3rd
17	11 September	Lost	4	7	31	Richmond	7	15	57	Metricon Stadium	H	7,061	4th
18	20 September	Won	10	9	69	Sydney	9	9	63	Metricon Stadium	A	2,798	4th
QF	1 October	Lost	5	12	42	Port Adelaide	9	4	58	Adelaide Oval	A	22,755	—N/a
SF	10 October	Won	15	10	100	Collingwood	5	2	32	Gabba	H	21,396	—N/a
PF	17 October	Won	11	16	82	Brisbane Lions	6	6	42	Gabba	A	29,121	—N/a
GF	24 October	Lost	7	8	50	Richmond	12	9	81	Gabba	A	29,707	—N/a

=== Ladder ===
Pos	Team	Pld	W	L	D	PF	PA	PP	Pts	Qualification
1	Port Adelaide	17	14	3	0	1185	869	136.4	56	Finals series
2	Brisbane Lions	17	14	3	0	1184	948	124.9	56	Finals series
3	Richmond (P)	17	12	4	1	1135	874	129.9	50	Finals series
4	Geelong	17	12	5	0	1233	901	136.8	48	Finals series
5	West Coast	17	12	5	0	1095	936	117.0	48	Finals series
6	St Kilda	17	10	7	0	1159	997	116.2	40	Finals series
7	Western Bulldogs	17	10	7	0	1103	1034	106.7	40	Finals series
8	Collingwood	17	9	7	1	965	881	109.5	38	Finals series
9	Melbourne	17	9	8	0	1063	986	107.8	36	
10	Greater Western Sydney	17	8	9	0	1007	1053	95.6	32	
11	Carlton	17	7	10	0	1017	1078	94.3	28	
12	Fremantle	17	7	10	0	866	924	93.7	28	
13	Essendon	17	6	10	1	938	1185	79.2	26	
14	Gold Coast	17	5	11	1	996	1099	90.6	22	
15	Hawthorn	17	5	12	0	1004	1194	84.1	20	
16	Sydney	17	5	12	0	890	1077	82.6	20	
17	North Melbourne	17	3	14	0	858	1205	71.2	12	
18	Adelaide	17	3	14	0	826	1283	64.4	12	

Updated to match(es) played on 21 September 2020. Source: AFL
Rules for classification: 1) points; 2) percentage; 3) number of points for.
(P) Premiers
