= 2021 Geelong Football Club season =

Geelong Football Club
2021 season
- President: Craig Drummond
- Coach: Chris Scott (11th season)
- Captains: Joel Selwood (10th season)
- Home ground: GMHBA Stadium
- AFL season: 16 wins, 6 losses (3rd)
- Finals series: Preliminary Final
- Leading goalkicker: Tom Hawkins (62)
- Average home attendance: 22,600 (Note: Excluding matches played behind closed doors, restricted attendances affected by COVID-19 pandemic in Victoria.)
- Club membership: 70,293

The 2021 season was the Geelong Football Club's 122nd season in the Australian Football League (AFL), the eleventh with Chris Scott as senior coach and tenth with Joel Selwood as captain.

Geelong participated in the 2021 Marsh Community Series as part of its pre-season schedule, and the club's home-and-away season began 20 March against Adelaide at the Adelaide Oval where they lost by 12 points. Geelong rallied during the season, winning 12 of their last 16 games to finish 3rd on the ladder.

== Season summary ==
=== Results ===
Key
| H | Home game |
| A | Away game |
| QF | Qualifying final |
| SF | Semi-final |
| PF | Preliminary final |

Table of season results
| Round | Date | Result | Score | | | Opponent | Score | | | Ground | | Attendance | Ladder |
| Round | Date | Result | G | B | T | Opponent | G | B | T | Ground | | Attendance | Ladder |
|---|---|---|---|---|---|---|---|---|---|---|---|---|---|
| 1 | 20 March | Lost | 13 | 13 | 91 | Adelaide | 15 | 13 | 103 | Adelaide Oval | A | 26985 | 12th |
| 2 | 26 March | Won | 12 | 9 | 81 | Brisbane Lions | 11 | 14 | 80 | GMHBA Stadium | H | 20070 | 11th |
| 3 | 5 April | Won | 10 | 9 | 69 | Hawthorn | 9 | 10 | 64 | Melbourne Cricket Ground | H | 50030 | 7th |
| 4 | 11 April | Lost | 9 | 6 | 60 | Melbourne | 12 | 13 | 85 | Melbourne Cricket Ground | A | 33728 | 10th |
| 5 | 18 April | Won | 10 | 17 | 77 | North Melbourne | 7 | 5 | 47 | GMHBA Stadium | H | 21282 | 8th |
| 6 | 24 April | Won | 21 | 10 | 136 | West Coast | 5 | 9 | 39 | GMHBA Stadium | H | 21282 | 4th |
| 7 | 1 May | Lost | 12 | 16 | 88 | Sydney | 14 | 6 | 90 | Sydney Cricket Ground | A | 29123 | 5th |
| 8 | 7 May | Won | 19 | 12 | 126 | Richmond | 9 | 9 | 63 | Melbourne Cricket Ground | A | 54857 | 4th |
| 9 | 14 May | Won | 10 | 8 | 68 | St Kilda | 5 | 17 | 47 | Marvel Stadium | A | 26712 | 3rd |
| 10 | 22 May | Won | 14 | 7 | 91 | Gold Coast | 8 | 9 | 57 | GMHBA Stadium | H | 22055 | 3rd |
| 11 | 29 May | Won | 8 | 13 | 61 | Collingwood | 6 | 15 | 51 | Melbourne Cricket Ground | A | 0 | 4th |
| 12 | Bye | | | | | | | | | | | | 3rd |
| 13 | 10 June | Won | 17 | 10 | 112 | Port Adelaide | 14 | 7 | 91 | Adelaide Oval | A | 28718 | 3rd |
| 14 | 18 June | Won | 12 | 11 | 83 | Western Bulldogs | 11 | 12 | 78 | GMHBA Stadium | H | 6583 | 3rd |
| 15 | 24 June | Lost | 7 | 8 | 50 | Brisbane Lions | 13 | 16 | 94 | Gabba | A | 29024 | 5th |
| 16 | 2 July | Won | 15 | 8 | 98 | Essendon | 8 | 9 | 57 | GMHBA Stadium | H | 15579 | 5th |
| 17 | 10 July | Won | 10 | 10 | 70 | Carlton | 5 | 14 | 44 | Melbourne Cricket Ground | A | 31834 | 3rd |
| 18 | 15 July | Won | 14 | 16 | 100 | Fremantle | 3 | 13 | 31 | Optus Stadium | A | 35271 | 3rd |
| 19 | 25 July | Won | 15 | 5 | 95 | Richmond | 8 | 9 | 57 | Melbourne Cricket Ground | H | 0 | 2nd |
| 20 | 31 July | Won | 8 | 14 | 62 | North Melbourne | 6 | 6 | 42 | Blundstone Arena | A | 8033 | 2nd |
| 21 | 6 August | Lost | 8 | 17 | 65 | Greater Western Sydney | 13 | 6 | 84 | GMHBA Stadium | H | 0 | 3rd |
| 22 | 14 August | Won | 13 | 7 | 85 | St Kilda | 11 | 5 | 71 | GMHBA Stadium | H | 0 | 2nd |
| 23 | 21 August | Lost | 12 | 5 | 77 | Melbourne | 12 | 9 | 81 | GMHBA Stadium | H | 0 | 3rd |
| QF | 27 August | Lost | 5 | 13 | 43 | Port Adelaide | 12 | 14 | 86 | Adelaide Oval | A | 19712 | —N/a |
| SF | 3 September | Won | 15 | 13 | 103 | Greater Western Sydney | 10 | 8 | 68 | Optus Stadium | N | 44091 | —N/a |
| PF | 10 September | Lost (Note: Geelong were eliminated from the finals series as a result of their preliminary final loss to Melbourne.) | 6 | 6 | 42 | Melbourne | 19 | 11 | 125 | Optus Stadium | N | 58599 | —N/a |

=== Ladder ===
| Pos | Team | Pld | W | L | D | PF | PA | PP | Pts | Qualification |
|---|---|---|---|---|---|---|---|---|---|---|
| 1 | Melbourne (P) | 22 | 17 | 4 | 1 | 1888 | 1443 | 130.8 | 70 | Finals series |
| 2 | Port Adelaide | 22 | 17 | 5 | 0 | 1884 | 1492 | 126.3 | 68 | Finals series |
| 3 | Geelong | 22 | 16 | 6 | 0 | 1845 | 1456 | 126.7 | 64 | Finals series |
| 4 | Brisbane Lions | 22 | 15 | 7 | 0 | 2131 | 1599 | 133.3 | 60 | Finals series |
| 5 | Western Bulldogs | 22 | 15 | 7 | 0 | 1994 | 1501 | 132.8 | 60 | Finals series |
| 6 | Sydney | 22 | 15 | 7 | 0 | 1986 | 1656 | 119.9 | 60 | Finals series |
| 7 | Greater Western Sydney | 22 | 11 | 10 | 1 | 1768 | 1773 | 99.7 | 46 | Finals series |
| 8 | Essendon | 22 | 11 | 11 | 0 | 1953 | 1790 | 109.1 | 44 | Finals series |
| 9 | West Coast | 22 | 10 | 12 | 0 | 1752 | 1880 | 93.2 | 40 | |
| 10 | St Kilda | 22 | 10 | 12 | 0 | 1644 | 1796 | 91.5 | 40 | |
| 11 | Fremantle | 22 | 10 | 12 | 0 | 1578 | 1825 | 86.5 | 40 | |
| 12 | Richmond | 22 | 9 | 12 | 1 | 1743 | 1780 | 97.9 | 38 | |
| 13 | Carlton | 22 | 8 | 14 | 0 | 1746 | 1972 | 88.5 | 32 | |
| 14 | Hawthorn | 22 | 7 | 13 | 2 | 1629 | 1912 | 85.2 | 32 | |
| 15 | Adelaide | 22 | 7 | 15 | 0 | 1616 | 1971 | 82.0 | 28 | |
| 16 | Gold Coast | 22 | 7 | 15 | 0 | 1430 | 1863 | 76.8 | 28 | |
| 17 | Collingwood | 22 | 6 | 16 | 0 | 1557 | 1818 | 85.6 | 24 | |
| 18 | North Melbourne | 22 | 4 | 17 | 1 | 1458 | 2075 | 70.3 | 18 | |

Updated to match(es) played on 21 August 2021. Source: AFL
Rules for classification: 1) points; 2) percentage; 3) number of points for.
(P) Premiers

== Reserves team ==
The club's reserves team, participating in the VFL, was coached by Shane O'Bree for a sixth season. Aaron Black was named captain, with Darcy Lang vice captain.

The reserves team finished the 2021 VFL season with a 7-2 win–loss record and placed fourth on the league's ladder and would have qualified for the finals series, had the season not been curtailed due to restrictions caused by the COVID-19 pandemic in Victoria.
