= Chris Scott (Australian footballer) =

Australian rules footballer, born 1976

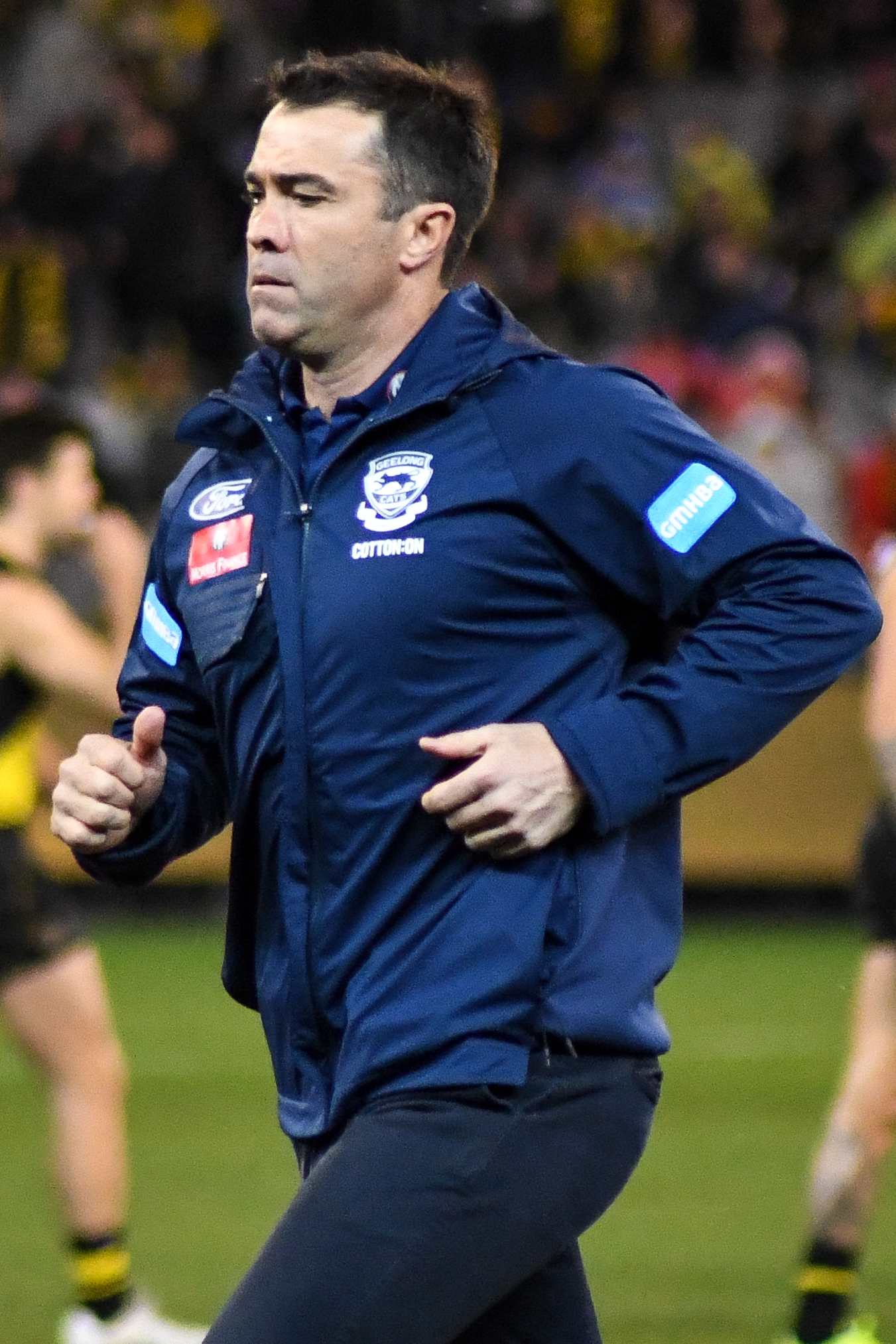
- Scott with Geelong in August 2018

Personal information
- Full name: Christopher Michael Scott
- Born: 3 May 1976 (age 50); Melbourne, Victoria, Australia
- Original team: Eastern Ranges
- Draft: 12th overall, 1993; Brisbane Bears
- Height: 182 cm (6 ft 0 in)
- Weight: 90 kg (198 lb)

Playing career^{1}
Years	Club	Games (Goals)
1994–1996	Brisbane Bears	55 (23)
1997–2007	Brisbane Lions	160 (56)
Total		215 (79)

Coaching career^{3}
Years	Club	Games (W–L–D)
2011–	Geelong	366 (249–114–3)
2017	Representative; Australia	2 (2–0–0)
2026	Victoria	1 (1–0–0)
- ^{1} Playing statistics correct to the end of 2007.^{3} Coaching statistics correct as of Round 6, 2026.

Career highlights
- Playing: AFL Rising Star 1994; Merrett–Murray Medal: 1998; 2× AFL premiership player: 2001, 2002; Ansett Cup Grand Final 2001; Brisbane Lions vice-captain 1999–2004; Coaching: 2× AFL premiership coach: 2011, 2022; 2× All-Australian coach: 2011, 2022; Victoria representative honours: 2026; Coach of the Australian international rules football team for the 2017 International Rules Series

Christopher Michael Scott (born 3 May 1976) is a former Australian rules footballer in the Australian Football League (AFL) best known for being a dual premiership player with the Brisbane Lions and a dual premiership coach at Geelong in 2011 and 2022.

He has been the senior coach of Geelong since 2011.

== Early life ==
Scott along with his twin brother Brad was born in Melbourne, Victoria, Australia to parents Colin and Lynne. He attended St Kevin’s College. Both were also proficient in cricket with Chris in year 11 playing in an APS premiership with St Kevin’s. His St Kevin’s school fees were aided by Legacy, due to the circumstances of his father's death when he was eight years old. Colin Scott served several tours during the Vietnam War as an Army reconnaissance pilot where he won a Distinguished Flying Cross and ultimately died due to injuries in the war.

Chris Scott was picked by the Brisbane Bears in the 1993 AFL draft with the 12th draft pick. Moving to Brisbane in Queensland as a 17-year-old he continued to study at St Kevin's College in Melbourne before completing year 12 at Brisbane Boys' College during his first year on Brisbane's list. Scott had to catch a taxi to training because he was too young to drive.

== Playing career ==
=== Brisbane Bears ===
Scott made his AFL debut in 1994 with the Brisbane Bears, taking out the Norwich Rising Star award.

Scott became one of the AFL's toughest defensive players, using his strength to outmuscle opposing forwards. Along with his twin brother Brad, they were nicknamed the Kray brothers by some fans for their forceful and ruthless styles of play.

Scott played a total of 55 games and kicked a total of 23 goals for Brisbane Bears from 1994 until 1996.

=== Brisbane Lions ===
At the end of the 1996 season, following the merger of the Fitzroy Football Club and the Brisbane Bears, Chris Scott joined the newly formed Brisbane Lions.

During Brisbane Lions's three-peat era, Scott was part of a powerful backline also containing Mal Michael, Chris Johnson and Justin Leppitsch. He was a member of the 2001 and 2002 premiership sides, but did not play in the 2003 AFL Grand Final after being named an emergency.

He caused controversy in round 1 of 2005 when Scott, along with Mal Michael, crashed into St Kilda's Nick Riewoldt after Riewoldt chose to stay on the ground with a broken collarbone. In the same game Scott also had several teeth knocked out after receiving a back-handed fist from opponent Aaron Hamill.

Scott's later career was plagued with injuries. Brisbane's round 22, 2007 match against Geelong on 1 September 2007 became his last, after he announced his retirement from his playing career a few days earlier on 28 August 2007.

Scott played a total of 160 games and kicked 56 goals for Brisbane Lions from 1997 until 2007.

== Coaching career ==
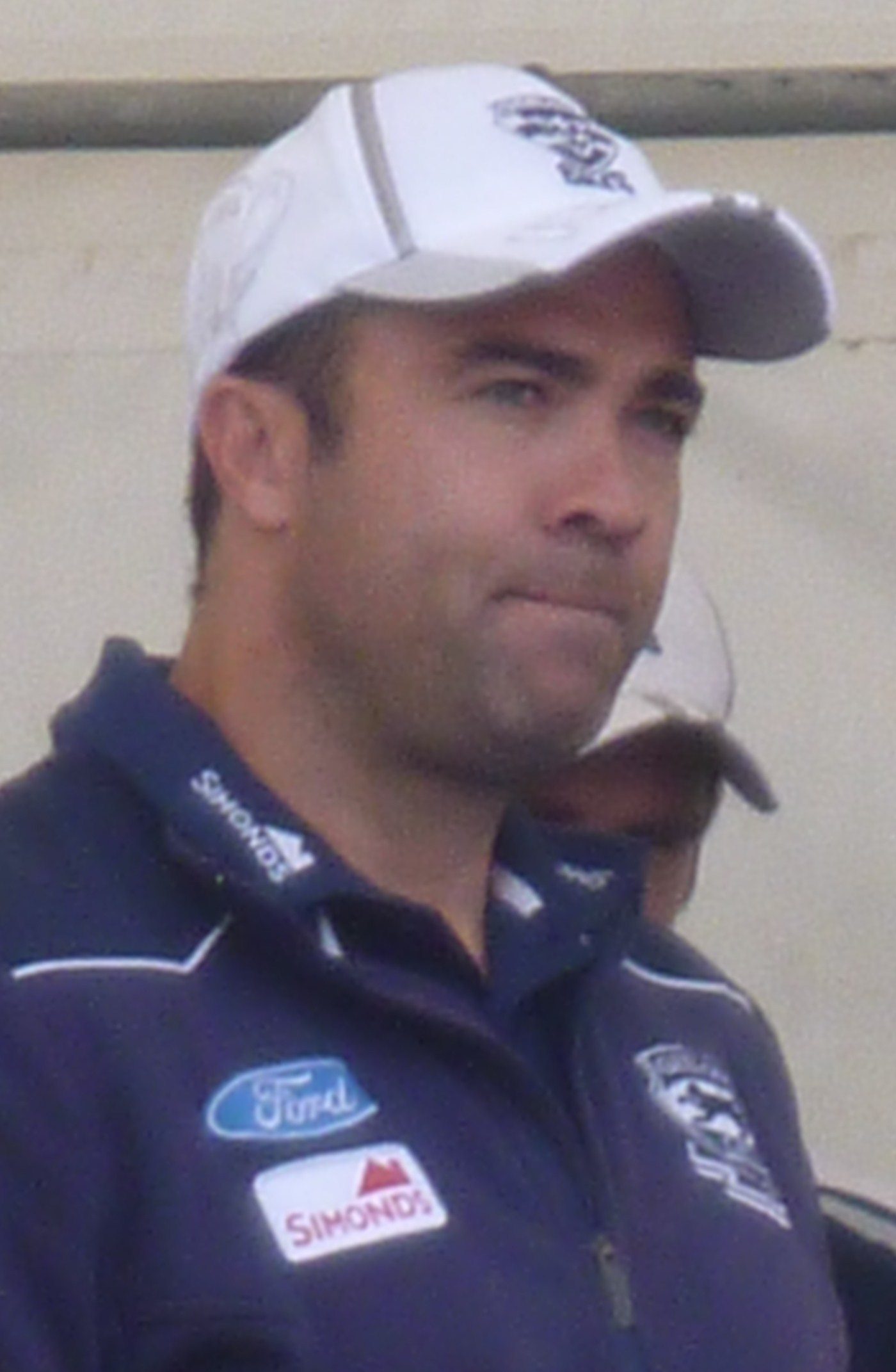
Scott following the Cats 2011 premiership win.

=== Fremantle Football Club assistant coach (2008–2010) ===
In 2008, Scott joined Fremantle Football Club as an assistant coach under senior coach Mark Harvey.

=== Geelong Football Club senior coach (2011–present) ===
In 2010, Scott was a frontrunner for the Port Adelaide Football Club senior coaching position to replace the sacked Mark Williams but ultimately fell short and caretaker senior coach and former Port captain, Matthew Primus, was chosen by the selection committee to be the club's senior coach. The media speculated that Scott was considered the second best applicant by the selection committee. On 18 October 2010, it was officially announced by the Geelong Football Club that Scott would be their senior coach, following Mark Thompson's resignation at the end of the 2010 season.

Scott had a brilliant start to his AFL coaching career, with Geelong winning its first thirteen matches of the 2011 season. His thirteen wins in succession was the best start to a coaching career in almost 80 years. But this streak was broken in round 15, when the Cats went down to Essendon by four points. Scott coached Geelong to its third Grand Final in five years and became the first senior coach since Malcolm Blight in 1997 to win a premiership as a first-year club senior coach, when Geelong under Scott defeated Collingwood in the 2011 AFL Grand Final by a margin of 38 points, where the final score was Geelong 18.11 (119) to Collingwood 12.9 (81). He is also the youngest premiership coach since Alex Jesaulenko in 1979 to win a Grand Final.

In August 2014, Scott signed a two-year contract extension extending his tenure as senior coach of Geelong until the end of 2017.

In August 2018, Scott signed a four-year contract extension extending his tenure as senior coach of Geelong until the end of 2022.

In the 2020 season, which was significantly affected by the COVID-19 pandemic in Australia, Scott coached Geelong to the 2020 AFL Grand Final, but fell short and lost to Richmond by a margin of 31 points, where the final score was Richmond 12.9.(81) to Geelong 7.8.(50).

In May 2022, Scott signed a two-year contract extension as senior coach of Geelong until the end of 2024.

In the 2022 season, Scott coached Geelong to a premiership win in the 2022 AFL Grand Final, where Geelong under Scott defeated Sydney Swans by a margin of 81 points, where the final score was Geelong 20.13 (133) to Sydney Swans 8.4 (52), This made Scott a two-time premiership coach.

In the 2025 season, Scott coached Geelong to the 2025 AFL Grand Final, but fell short and lost to Brisbane Lions where the final score was Geelong 11.9 (75) to Brisbane Lions 18.14 (122).

== Statistics ==
=== Playing statistics ===
Legend
G	Goals	K	Kicks	D	Disposals	T	Tackles
B	Behinds	H	Handballs	M	Marks
#	Played in that season's premiership team

Season	Team	No.	Games	Totals							Averages (per game)							Votes
Season	Team	No.	Games	G	B	K	H	D	M	T	G	B	K	H	D	M	T	Votes
1994	Brisbane Bears	22	19	9	6	193	88	281	66	27	0.5	0.3	10.2	4.6	14.8	3.5	1.4	1
1995	Brisbane Bears	22	14	8	12	118	65	183	57	10	0.6	0.9	8.4	4.6	13.1	4.1	0.7	0
1996	Brisbane Bears	22	22	6	8	199	110	309	62	33	0.3	0.4	9.0	5.0	14.0	2.8	1.5	0
1997	Brisbane Lions	22	5	3	1	26	19	45	15	2	0.6	0.2	5.2	3.8	9.0	3.0	0.4	0
1998	Brisbane Lions	22	21	14	8	296	156	452	100	45	0.7	0.4	14.1	7.4	21.5	4.8	2.1	1
1999	Brisbane Lions	22	24	4	4	363	150	513	150	34	0.2	0.2	15.1	6.3	21.4	6.3	1.4	7
2000	Brisbane Lions	22	21	7	5	274	135	409	137	48	0.3	0.2	13.0	6.4	19.5	6.5	2.3	0
2001^{#}	Brisbane Lions	22	20	8	7	275	121	396	142	31	0.4	0.4	13.8	6.1	19.8	7.1	1.6	2
2002^{#}	Brisbane Lions	22	22	5	3	260	130	390	134	30	0.2	0.1	11.8	5.9	17.7	6.1	1.4	3
2003	Brisbane Lions	22	19	2	2	179	88	267	108	38	0.1	0.1	9.4	4.6	14.1	5.7	2.0	0
2004	Brisbane Lions	22	13	3	1	106	52	158	49	25	0.2	0.1	8.2	4.0	12.2	3.8	1.9	0
2005	Brisbane Lions	22	13	10	8	110	34	144	68	23	0.8	0.6	8.5	2.6	11.1	5.2	1.8	0
2006	Brisbane Lions	22	0	—	—	—	—	—	—	—	—	—	—	—	—	—	—	–
2007	Brisbane Lions	22	2	0	0	8	8	16	6	5	0.0	0.0	4.0	4.0	8.0	3.0	2.5	0
Career			215	79	65	2407	1156	3563	1094	351	0.4	0.3	11.2	5.4	16.6	5.1	1.6	14

== Head coaching record ==
Team	Year	Home and Away Season					Finals			
Team	Year	Won	Lost	Drew	Win %	Finish	Won	Lost	Win %	Result
GEE	2011	19	3	0	.864	2nd out of 17	3	0	1.000	Defeated Collingwood in Grand Final
GEE	2012	15	7	0	.682	6th out of 18	0	1	.000	Lost to Fremantle in Elimination Final
GEE	2013	18	4	0	.818	2nd out of 18	1	2	.333	Lost to Hawthorn in Preliminary Final
GEE	2014	17	5	0	.773	3rd out of 18	0	2	.000	Lost to North Melbourne in Semi Final
GEE	2015	11	9	1	.540	11th out of 18	-	-	-	-
GEE	2016	17	5	0	.773	2nd out of 18	1	1	.500	Lost to Sydney in Preliminary Final
GEE	2017	15	6	1	.705	2nd out of 18	1	2	.333	Lost to Adelaide in Preliminary Final
GEE	2018	13	9	0	.591	8th out of 18	0	1	.000	Lost to Melbourne in Elimination Final
GEE	2019	16	6	0	.727	1st out of 18	1	2	.333	Lost to Richmond in Preliminary Final
GEE	2020	12	5	0	.706	4th out of 18	2	2	.500	Lost to Richmond in Grand Final
GEE	2021	16	6	0	.727	3rd out of 18	1	2	.333	Lost to Melbourne in Preliminary Final
GEE	2022	18	4	0	.818	1st out of 18	3	0	1.000	Defeated Sydney in Grand Final
GEE	2023	10	12	1	.457	10th out of 18	-	-	-	-
GEE	2024	15	8	0	.652	3rd out of 18	1	1	.500	Lost to Brisbane in Preliminary Final
GEE	2025	17	6	0	.739	2nd out of 18	2	1	.667	Lost to Brisbane in Grand Final
		229	95	3	.705		16	17	.485	Premierships: 2011, 2022

== Honours and achievements ==
Brownlow Medal votes
Season	Votes
1994	1
1995	0
1996	0
1997	0
1998	1
1999	7
2000	0
2001	2
2002	3
2003	0
2004	0
2005	0
2006	0
2007	0
Total	14

=== Playing honours ===
Team

- AFL premiership (Brisbane Lions): 2001, 2002

Individual

- Merrett–Murray Medal (Brisbane Lions): 1998
- Brisbane Lions vice-captain: 1999–2004
- Norwich Rising Star award (later named the Ron Evans Medal): 1994
- AFL Rising Star Nominee: 1994 (round 7)
- Brisbane Lions - Most professional player: 1999
- Brisbane Lions Team of the Decade: 2000–2010 (half-back flank)

=== Coaching honours ===
Team

- AFL premiership (Geelong): 2011, 2022
- McClelland Trophy (Geelong): 2019 2022

Individual

- Jock McHale Medal: 2011, 2022
- All-Australian: 2011, 2022
- Coach of the Australian international rules football team for the 2017 International Rules Series

== Personal life ==
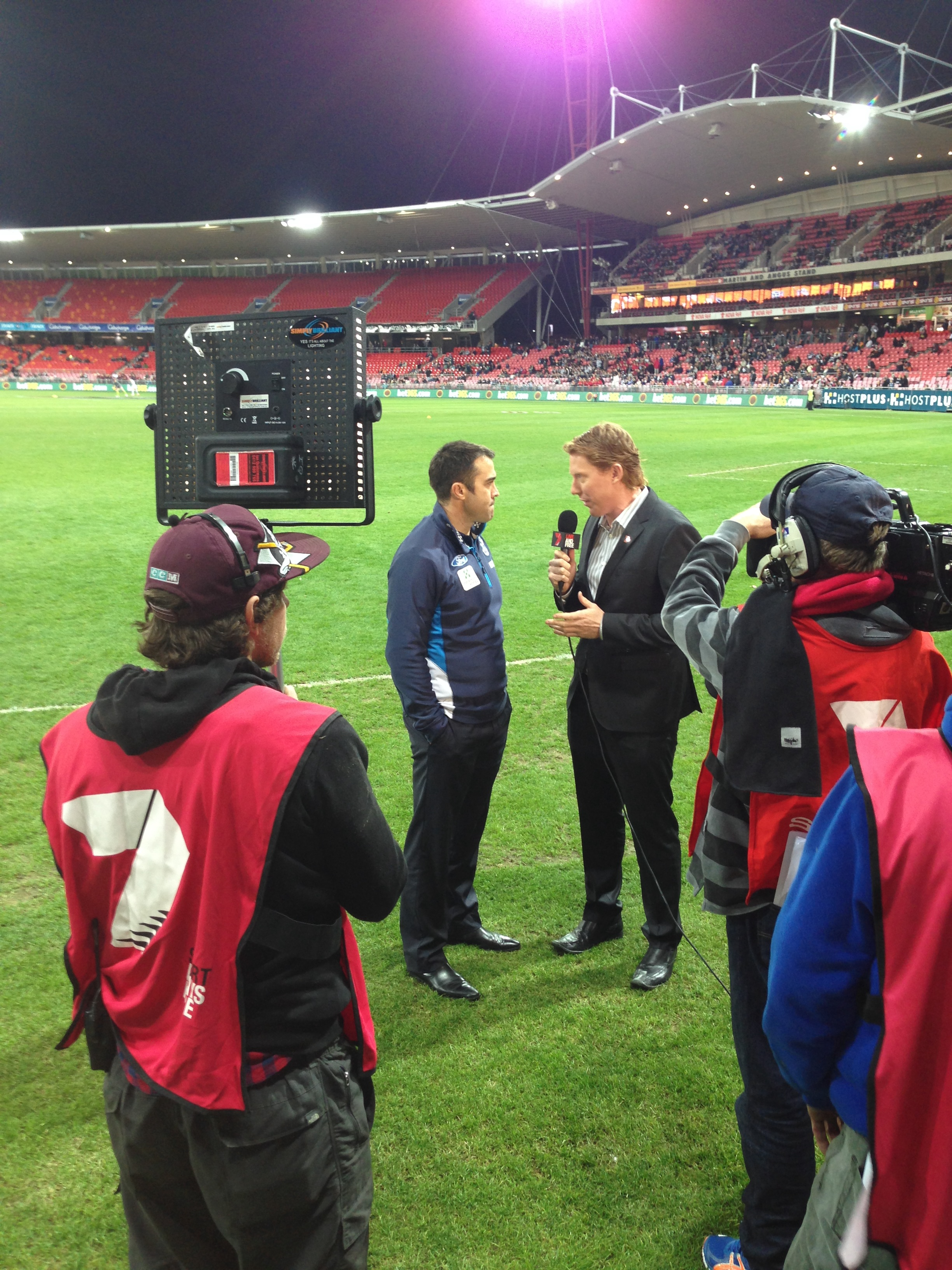
Scott (left) being interviewed by former Geelong premiership captain Cameron Ling (right) during a match in 2014.

Scott's identical twin brother Brad Scott played alongside him at the Brisbane Lions and is the former senior coach of Essendon. Chris is the older twin by a few minutes.
