= Nathan Kreuger =

Australian rules footballer (born 1999)

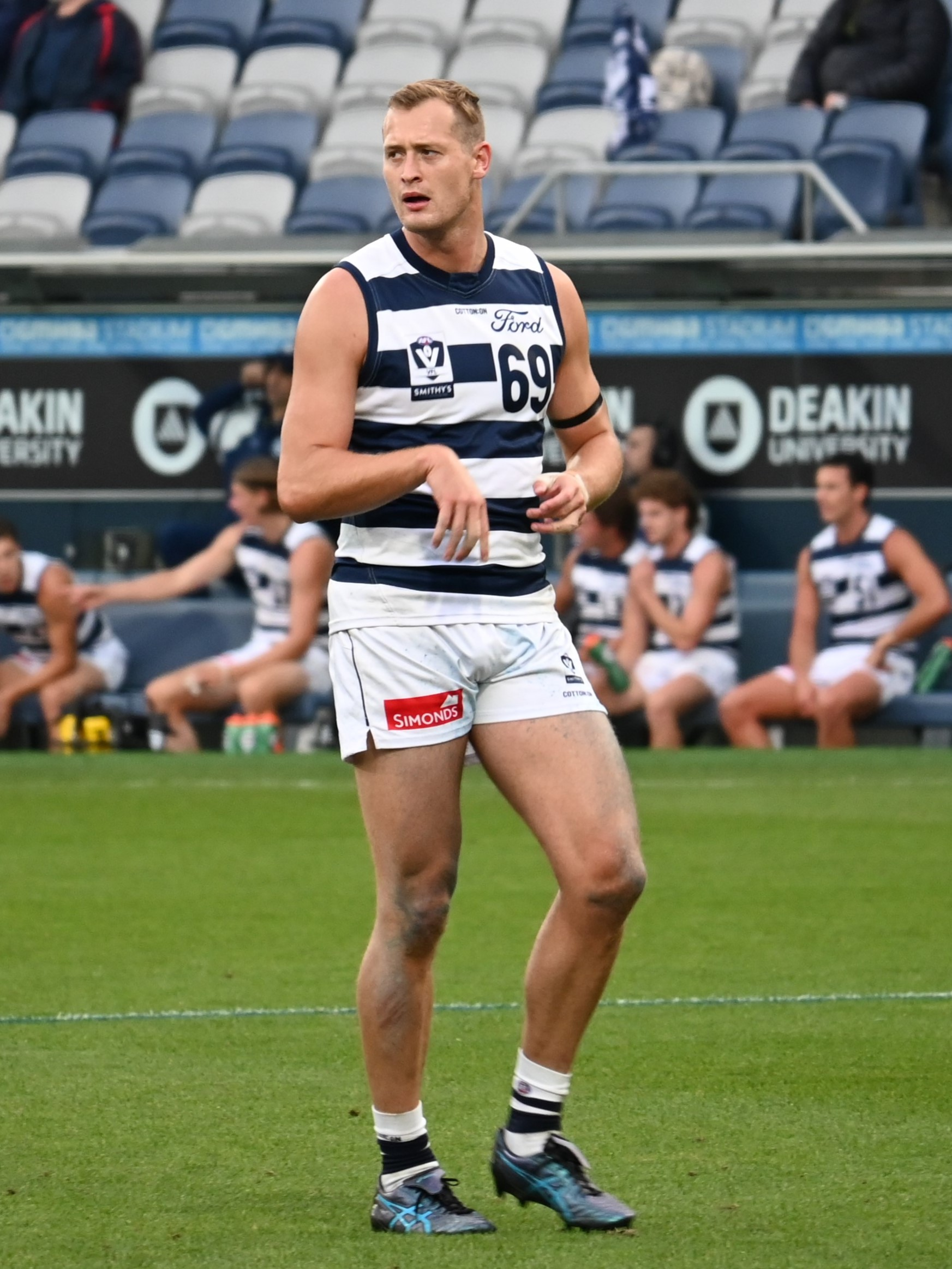
- Kreuger in April 2025

Personal information
- Full name: Nathan Kreuger
- Nicknames: Kreugs, Freddy
- Born: 25 June 1999 (age 27)
- Original team: Victor Harbor (SA) / South Adelaide (SANFL)
- Draft: 2018 Carlton pre-draft selection traded to Geelong
- Height: 196 cm (6 ft 5 in)
- Weight: 98 kg (216 lb)
- Position: Forward / Ruck

Club information
- Current club: Geelong reserves

Playing career
Years	Club	Games (Goals)
2019–2021	Geelong	2 (0)
2022–2024	Collingwood	13 (11)
Total		15 (11)

Nathan Kreuger (born 25 June 1999) is an Australian rules footballer who currently plays for the Geelong Football Club in the Victorian Football League (VFL). He previously played for Geelong and Collingwood in the Australian Football League (AFL).

== Career ==
Kreuger was picked in a roundabout way in 2018 prior to the draft. The two bottom teams on the ladder that year Carlton and Gold Coast applied for priority picks in the National Draft, which the AFL denied. However, Gold Coast were granted pre-draft access to up to three and Carlton up to two mature-aged State League players each, these selections could be traded to other clubs. Carlton had traded one of their picks to Geelong.

Kreuger has the physical attributes to be a key forward, he spent his first two seasons developing his game in the Victorian Football League (VFL). He made his debut against North Melbourne in Tasmania.

At the end of the 2021 season, Kreuger was traded to Collingwood. Kreuger played 13 games across three seasons at the Magpies, before being delisted at the end of the 2024 AFL season. He returned to Geelong, signing with the club's reserves team in the VFL.

== Statistics ==
Legend
G	Goals	K	Kicks	D	Disposals	T	Tackles
B	Behinds	H	Handballs	M	Marks

Season	Team	No.	Games	Totals							Averages (per game)							Votes
Season	Team	No.	Games	G	B	K	H	D	M	T	G	B	K	H	D	M	T	Votes
2019	Geelong	15	0	—	—	—	—	—	—	—	—	—	—	—	—	—	—	0
2020 (Note: The 2020 season was played with 17 home-and-away matches per team (down from 22) and 16-minute quarters with time on (down from 20-minute quarters with time on) due to the impact of the COVID-19 pandemic.)	Geelong	15	0	—	—	—	—	—	—	—	—	—	—	—	—	—	—	0
2021	Geelong	15	2	0	0	11	4	15	7	8	0.0	0.0	5.5	2.0	7.5	3.5	4.0	0
2022	Collingwood	15	5	4	3	15	7	22	10	7	0.8	0.6	3.0	1.4	4.4	2.0	1.4	0
2023	Collingwood	15	2	0	0	2	5	7	1	1	0.0	0.0	1.0	2.5	3.5	0.5	0.5	0
2024	Collingwood	15	6	7	6	33	13	46	21	14	1.2	1.0	5.5	2.2	7.7	3.5	2.3	0
Career			15	11	9	61	29	90	39	30	0.7	0.6	4.1	1.9	6.0	2.6	2.0	0
