= Stefan Okunbor =

Irish footballer

Personal information
- Born: Moldova

Sport
- Sport: Gaelic football
- Football Position: Midfield
Club
- Years: Club
- 2022 –: Na Gaeil

Stefan Okunbor is an Irish footballer who has played both Gaelic football and Australian rules football.

== Career ==
Okunbor began playing Gaelic football at the age of 7. He played for Kerry in the 2016 All-Ireland Minor Football Championship; he was later signed to Geelong Football Club for a two-year contract in 2018.

In 2021, his contract with Geelong ended; as a result, he returned to Ireland to play for Kerry.

== Personal life ==
Stefan was born in Moldova to a Nigerian father and Moldovan mother; he moved to Tralee at the age of three. He has studied bioengineering at the University of Limerick.
