= Ben Jarvis (footballer) =

Australian rules footballer

Personal information
- Full name: Benjamin Jarvis
- Born: 27 July 2000 (age 26)
- Original team: Lincoln South/Rostrevor College / Norwood (SANFL)
- Draft: No. 48, 2018 national draft, Geelong
- Debut: 11 September 2020, Geelong vs. Richmond, at Metricon Stadium
- Height / weight: 190cm/86kg
- Position: Key forward

Playing career^{1}
| Years | Club | Games (Goals) |
| 2020 | Geelong | 1 (0) |
- ^{1} Playing statistics correct to the end of 2021.

Career highlights
- SANFL Premiership Player: 2022

Benjamin Jarvis (born 27 July 2000) is a former Australian rules footballer who played for Geelong in the Australian Football League (AFL). He was recruited by Geelong with the 48th pick in the 2018 AFL draft.

== AFL career ==
Jarvis made his debut in Geelong's 26 point loss to the Richmond in the 17th round of the 2020 AFL season. He was delisted by Geelong at the conclusion of the 2021 season.

== Statistics ==
Statistics are correct to the end of the 2020 season

Legend
| G | Goals | K | Kicks | D | Disposals | T | Tackles |
| B | Behinds | H | Handballs | M | Marks |

| Season | Team | No. | Games | Totals | | | | | | | Averages (per game) | | | | | | |
| Season | Team | No. | Games | G | B | K | H | D | M | T | G | B | K | H | D | M | T |
|---|---|---|---|---|---|---|---|---|---|---|---|---|---|---|---|---|---|
| 2020 (Note: The 2020 season was played with 17 home-and-away matches per team (down from 22) and 16-minute quarters with time on (down from 20-minute quarters with time on) due to the impact of the COVID-19 pandemic.) | Geelong | 10 | 1 | 0 | 1 | 3 | 2 | 5 | 3 | 1 | 0.0 | 1.0 | 3.0 | 2.0 | 5.0 | 3.0 | 1.0 |
| Career | | | 1 | 0 | 1 | 3 | 2 | 5 | 3 | 1 | 0.0 | 1.0 | 3.0 | 2.0 | 5.0 | 3.0 | 1.0 |
