= Jacob Kennerley =

Personal information
- Full name: Jacob Christopher Kennerley
- Born: June 16, 2000 (age 26); Cummins, South Australia
- Original team: Norwood (SANFL)
- Draft: No. 50, 2018 AFL Draft
- Position: Midfielder / Half-forward

Club information
- Current club: Norwood Football Club (SANFL)

Playing career^{1}
Years	Club	Games (Goals)
2019–2020	Geelong	0 (0)
2021–	Norwood	74 (32)
- ^{1} Playing statistics correct to the end of 2025.

Career highlights
- SANFL premiership player: 2026

Jacob Christopher Kennerley (born 16 June 2000) is an Australian rules footballer currently playing for the Norwood Football Club in the South Australian National Football League (SANFL). A former AFL-listed player with Geelong Football Club, Kennerley has become known for his athleticism, leadership, and consistency in the SANFL.

== Early life and junior career ==
Kennerley grew up in Cummins on the Eyre Peninsula of South Australia. At age 15, he moved to Adelaide to attend Rostrevor College, where he continued to pursue football. He played junior football for the Cummins Ramblers and joined Norwood's Under-18 team. In 2018, Kennerley represented South Australia in the AFL Under-18 Championships.

== AFL career ==
Kennerley was selected with pick 50 in the 2018 AFL draft by the Geelong Football Club. He did not play an AFL match during his time at Geelong and was delisted at the end of the 2020 season.

== SANFL career ==
Kennerley returned to Norwood for the 2021 SANFL season and made his senior debut in Round 1 against Port Adelaide. He quickly became a key contributor and was appointed co-captain of the club in 2023. He was named sole captain for the 2024 and 2025 seasons.

== Playing style ==
Kennerley is known for his elite endurance and ball-winning ability. He gained attention during the 2018 AFL Draft Combine by recording a time of 6 minutes and 4 seconds in the 2km time trial—one of the fastest times ever recorded.

== Personal life ==
Kennerley is the son of former country player Brock

Kennerley. He has spoken about wanting to honor his father’s legacy through his football career.[3]
