= 2016 Geelong Football Club season =

Geelong Football Club
2016 season
- President: Colin Carter
- Coach: Chris Scott (6th season)
- Captains: Joel Selwood (5th season)
- Home ground: Simonds Stadium
- AFL season: 2nd
- Finals series: Preliminary final
- Best and Fairest: Patrick Dangerfield
- Leading goalkicker: Tom Hawkins (55)
- Highest home attendance: 74,218 vs. Hawthorn (Round 1)
- Lowest home attendance: 21,127 vs. Adelaide (Round 18)
- Average home attendance: 30,497
- Club membership: TBA

The 2016 Geelong Football Club season was the club's 117th season of senior competition in the Australian Football League (AFL). The club also fielded its reserves team in the Victorian Football League (VFL) for the 17th season.

== Overview ==
Prior to the 2016 season, Dale Amos, who had been a member of Geelong's coaching group since 2009, moved to an assistant coaching position at Carlton.

== Season summary ==
=== Regular season ===
Geelong's 2016 AFL season fixture
Round	Date and local time	Opponent	Home	Away	Result	Venue	Attendance	Ladder position
Round	Date and local time	Opponent	Scores^{[a]}			Venue	Attendance	Ladder position
1	Monday, 28 March (3:20 pm)	Hawthorn	18.8 (116)	12.14 (86)	Won by 30 points	MCG [H]	74,218	5th
2	Sunday, 3 April (1:10 pm)	Greater Western Sydney	13.11 (89)	11.10 (76)	Lost by 13 points	Manuka Oval [A]	13,656	6th
3	Sunday, 10 April (4:40 pm)	Brisbane Lions	18.17 (125)	7.14 (56)	Won by 69 points	Simonds Stadium [H]	23,320	5th
4	Saturday, 16 April (1:45 pm)	Essendon	6.6 (42)	9.18 (72)	Won by 30 points	MCG [A]	42,723	4th
5	Saturday, 23 April (7:15 pm)	Port Adelaide	8.11 (59)	16.11 (107)	Won by 48 points	Adelaide Oval [A]	44,937	4th
6	Saturday, 30 April (7:25 pm)	Gold Coast	25.18 (168)	7.6 (48)	Won by 120 points	Simonds Stadium [H]	23,007	2nd
7	Saturday, 7 May (2:10 pm)	West Coast	18.15 (123)	12.7 (79)	Won by 44 points	Simonds Stadium [H]	25,429	2nd
8	Friday, 13 May (7:20 pm)	Adelaide	11.6 (72)	13.20 (98)	Won by 26 points	Adelaide Oval [A]	53,141	2nd
9	Saturday, 21 May (1:45 pm)	Collingwood	16.8 (104)	11.14 (80)	Lost by 24 points	MCG [A]	59,864	2nd
10	Sunday, 29 May (1:10 pm)	Carlton	16.8 (104)	12.13 (85)	Lost by 19 points	Etihad Stadium [A]	33,535	3rd
11	Saturday, 4 June (4:35 pm)	Greater Western Sydney	14.14 (98)	14.4 (88)	Won by 10 points	Simonds Stadium [H]	22,007	3rd
12	Saturday, 11 June (7:25 pm)	North Melbourne	15.15 (105)	12.2 (74)	Won by 31 points	Etihad Stadium [H]	44,025	2nd
13	Saturday, 18 June (7:25 pm)	Western Bulldogs	5.13 (43)	16.4 (100)	Won by 57 points	Etihad Stadium [A]	41,725	1st
14	Saturday, 25 June (7:25 pm)	St Kilda	14.9 (93)	13.12 (90)	Lost by 3 points	Etihad Stadium [A]	28,745	3rd
15	Bye							2nd
16	Friday, 8 July (7:50 pm)	Sydney	9.6 (60)	15.8 (98)	Lost by 38 points	Simonds Stadium [H]	24,339	6th
17	Friday, 15 July (6:10 pm)	Fremantle	9.7 (61)	11.12 (78)	Won by 17 points	Domain Stadium [A]	31,042	7th
18	Saturday, 23 July (7:25 pm)	Adelaide	12.13 (85)	7.13 (55)	Won by 30 points	Simonds Stadium [H]	21,127	4th
19	Friday, 29 July (7:50 pm)	Western Bulldogs	16.7 (103)	11.12 (78)	Won by 25 points	Simonds Stadium [H]	24,331	4th
20	Sunday, 7 August (3:20 pm)	Essendon	15.10 (100)	4.10 (34)	Won by 66 points	Etihad Stadium [H]	29,254	5th
21	Sunday, 14 August (3:20 pm)	Richmond	12.6 (78)	10.22 (82)	Won by 4 points	MCG [A]	45,667	4th
22	Sunday, 21 August (3:20 pm)	Brisbane Lions	10.9 (69)	19.15 (129)	Won by 60 points	Gabba [A]	20,477	3rd
23	Saturday, 27 August (1:45 pm)	Melbourne	24.11 (155)	6.8 (44)	Won by 111 points	Simonds Stadium [H]	24,413	2nd

==== Ladder ====
Pos	Team	Pld	W	L	D	PF	PA	PP	Pts	Qualification
1	Sydney	22	17	5	0	2221	1469	151.2	68	2016 finals
2	Geelong	22	17	5	0	2235	1554	143.8	68	2016 finals
3	Hawthorn	22	17	5	0	2134	1800	118.6	68	2016 finals
4	Greater Western Sydney	22	16	6	0	2380	1663	143.1	64	2016 finals
5	Adelaide	22	16	6	0	2483	1795	138.3	64	2016 finals
6	West Coast	22	16	6	0	2181	1678	130.0	64	2016 finals
7	Western Bulldogs (P)	22	15	7	0	1857	1609	115.4	60	2016 finals
8	North Melbourne	22	12	10	0	1956	1859	105.2	48	2016 finals
9	St Kilda	22	12	10	0	1953	2041	95.7	48	
10	Port Adelaide	22	10	12	0	2055	1939	106.0	40	
11	Melbourne	22	10	12	0	1944	1991	97.6	40	
12	Collingwood	22	9	13	0	1910	1998	95.6	36	
13	Richmond	22	8	14	0	1713	2155	79.5	32	
14	Carlton	22	7	15	0	1568	1978	79.3	28	
15	Gold Coast	22	6	16	0	1778	2273	78.2	24	
16	Fremantle	22	4	18	0	1574	2119	74.3	16	
17	Brisbane Lions	22	3	19	0	1770	2872	61.6	12	
18	Essendon	22	3	19	0	1437	2356	61.0	12	

Source: AFL
Rules for classification: 1) points; 2) percentage; 3) number of points for.
(P) Premiers

=== Finals series ===
Geelong's 2016 AFL finals series fixture
Round	Date and local time	Opponent	Home	Away	Result	Venue	Attendance
Round	Date and local time	Opponent	Scores^{[a]}			Venue	Attendance
Qualifying Final	Friday, 9 September (7:50 pm)	Hawthorn	12.13 (85)	12.11 (83)	Won by 2 points	MCG [H]	87,533
Preliminary Final	Friday, 23 September (7:50 pm)	Sydney	8.12 (60)	15.7 (97)	Lost by 37 points	MCG [H]	71,772
As a result of Geelong's loss in their preliminary final, the club was eliminated from the 2016 AFL finals series

=== Key statistics ===
Summary of Geelong's key match statistics
Round	Result	Kicks		Handballs		Disposals		Free kicks		Clearances		Inside-50s		Contested possessions		Tackles		Hitouts	
1	W	196	+10	153	−21	349	−11	24	−4	51	+11	61	+15	160	+19	81	0	56	−8
2	L	188	−23	157	−25	345	−48	10	−13	26	−13	48	−8	126	−22	50	−7	28	−13
3	W	221	+49	175	+15	396	+64	32	+2	40	+12	69	+34	137	+11	73	+21	38	+7
4	W	197	−10	162	−57	359	−67	16	−8	27	−11	50	+10	123	−9	71	+12	26	−6
5	W	212	+59	160	+4	372	+63	25	+2	46	+12	58	+13	165	+39	79	−2	60	+32
6	W	252	+102	193	+37	445	+139	16	−6	42	+18	62	+28	148	+22	76	+13	32	−7
7	W	220	+40	162	−15	382	+25	27	+6	44	+12	60	+17	135	−2	77	+22	39	−7
8	W	213	−7	169	+63	382	+56	14	−12	42	+2	61	+17	164	+8	81	+1	48	+5
9	L	192	−25	149	−4	341	−29	23	−3	32	+1	54	+8	138	−15	85	+15	38	+17
10	L	196	−15	203	+26	399	+11	10	−12	35	−7	51	−9	139	+3	69	−11	45	+14
11	W	222	−2	165	+31	387	+29	29	+13	49	+3	76	+28	174	+30	61	−18	45	−6
12	W	207	+18	173	+41	380	+59	18	−1	47	+14	57	+14	144	+37	46	+5	35	−9
13	W	218	+32	167	−22	385	+10	20	−1	36	+6	44	−2	125	−12	78	+19	39	+4
14	L	216	+12	170	+19	386	+31	15	−1	27	−8	52	−2	138	+8	52	−11	34	+4
15	Bye																		
16	L	193	−8	144	−28	337	−36	24	+1	34	−1	52	+9	153	−4	75	−11	33	−2
17	W	213	+23	190	+23	403	+46	20	0	35	−4	50	+10	150	+11	84	+6	36	−4
18	W	223	0	191	+67	414	+67	15	−3	39	−3	55	+9	168	+18	84	+13	39	−9
19	W	215	+28	181	+1	396	+29	22	0	38	+5	47	−6	177	+27	83	+2	55	+27
20	W	208	−24	196	+74	404	+50	16	+2	28	−7	58	+21	128	+27	37	−12	42	+13
21	W	224	−12	176	+34	400	+22	23	−8	32	+8	66	+27	139	+24	52	+2	26	−4
22	W	219	+30	183	+28	402	+58	18	−4	41	−2	61	+21	139	+23	64	+2	36	−7
23	W	219	+42	179	−2	398	+40	20	+5	41	+10	59	+16	162	+36	74	+9	42	−3
QF	W	197	−43	156	+5	353	−38	20	+2	39	+1	47	−9	170	+52	63	−2	38	−2
QF	L	173	−41	190	−28	363	−13	24	+2	34	−6	72	+32	173	+6	81	−21	48	+24

== Honours ==
=== Milestones ===
- Round 1 - Patrick Dangerfield (Geelong debut), Lachie Henderson (Geelong debut), Zac Smith (Geelong debut)
- Round 3 - Tom Ruggles (AFL debut)
- Round 12 - Steven Motlop (100 AFL games)
- Round 17 - Andrew Mackie (250 AFL games), Cameron Guthrie (100 AFL games)
- Round 18 - Sam Menegola (AFL debut)
- Round 19 - Corey Enright (326 AFL games, a new Geelong record), Jimmy Bartel (300 AFL games)

=== Others ===
- Round 1 - Patrick Dangerfield (2016 AFL Mark of the Year nomination)
- Round 2 - Tom Hawkins (2016 AFL Goal of the Year round winner)
- Round 4 - Zac Smith (2016 AFL Mark of the Year round winner)
- Round 7 - Josh Caddy (2016 AFL Goal of the Year nomination)
- Round 8 - Steven Motlop (2016 AFL Goal of the Year nomination)
- Round 9 - Tom Hawkins (2016 AFL Mark of the Year nomination)
- Round 12 - Steven Motlop (2016 AFL Goal of the Year nomination)
- Round 17 - Patrick Dangerfield (2016 AFL Goal of the Year nomination)

== Notes ==
Key

- H Home match.
- A Away match.

Notes

- **^{a}** Geelong's scores are indicated in **bold** font.
