= Aaron Black (footballer, born 1990) =

Australian rules footballer

Personal information
- Full name: Aaron Black
- Born: 29 November 1990 (age 35)
- Original team: Peel Thunder (WAFL)
- Draft: No. 25, 2009 national draft
- Height: 192 cm (6 ft 4 in)
- Weight: 92 kg (203 lb)
- Position: Centre half-forward

Playing career^{1}
Years	Club	Games (Goals)
2011–2016	North Melbourne	50 (64)
2017–2018	Geelong	7 (5)
Total		57 (69)
- ^{1} Playing statistics correct to the end of 2018.

Aaron Black (born 29 November 1990) is a former professional Australian rules footballer who played for the North Melbourne Football Club and the Geelong Football Club in the Australian Football League (AFL). He was recruited by North Melbourne with the twenty-fifth selection in the 2009 national draft and he made his senior debut in round 24 of the 2011 season against Richmond. In 2016, he spent the entire season in the Victorian Football League (VFL) and at the end of the season, he mutually agreed with North Melbourne to seek opportunities at another club despite being contracted to North Melbourne until the end of 2017. He was officially traded to Geelong in October. Black was delisted after 2018 though in 2019 he became part of the coaching team for the inaugural Geelong Cats AFLW side and also was named co-captain of the club's VFL outfit.

== Statistics ==
Statistics are correct to the end of 2018

Legend
G	Goals	K	Kicks	D	Disposals	T	Tackles
B	Behinds	H	Handballs	M	Marks

Season	Team	No.	Games	Totals							Averages (per game)							Votes
Season	Team	No.	Games	G	B	K	H	D	M	T	G	B	K	H	D	M	T	Votes
2010	North Melbourne	35	0	–	–	–	–	–	–	–	–	–	–	–	–	–	–	0
2011	North Melbourne	35	1	1	0	5	4	9	3	0	1.0	0.0	5.0	4.0	9.0	3.0	0.0	0
2012	North Melbourne	35	3	3	1	10	13	23	8	6	1.0	0.3	3.3	4.3	7.7	2.7	2.0	0
2013	North Melbourne	35	18	33	23	144	105	249	86	43	1.8	1.3	8.0	5.8	13.8	4.8	2.4	0
2014	North Melbourne	35	25	26	23	165	89	254	110	51	1.0	0.9	6.6	3.6	10.2	4.4	2.0	0
2015	North Melbourne	35	3	1	1	14	12	26	7	4	0.3	0.3	4.7	4.0	8.7	2.3	1.3	0
2016	North Melbourne	35	0	–	–	–	–	–	–	–	–	–	–	–	–	–	–	0
2017	Geelong	23	4	5	2	35	28	63	21	11	0.3	0.3	4.7	4.0	8.7	2.3	1.3	0
2018	Geelong	23	3	0	0	19	15	34	15	7	0.0	0.0	9.5	7.5	17.0	7.5	3.5	
Career			57	69	50	392	266	658	250	122	1.2	0.9	7.0	4.8	11.8	4.5	2.2	0
