= Mark O'Connor (sportsman) =

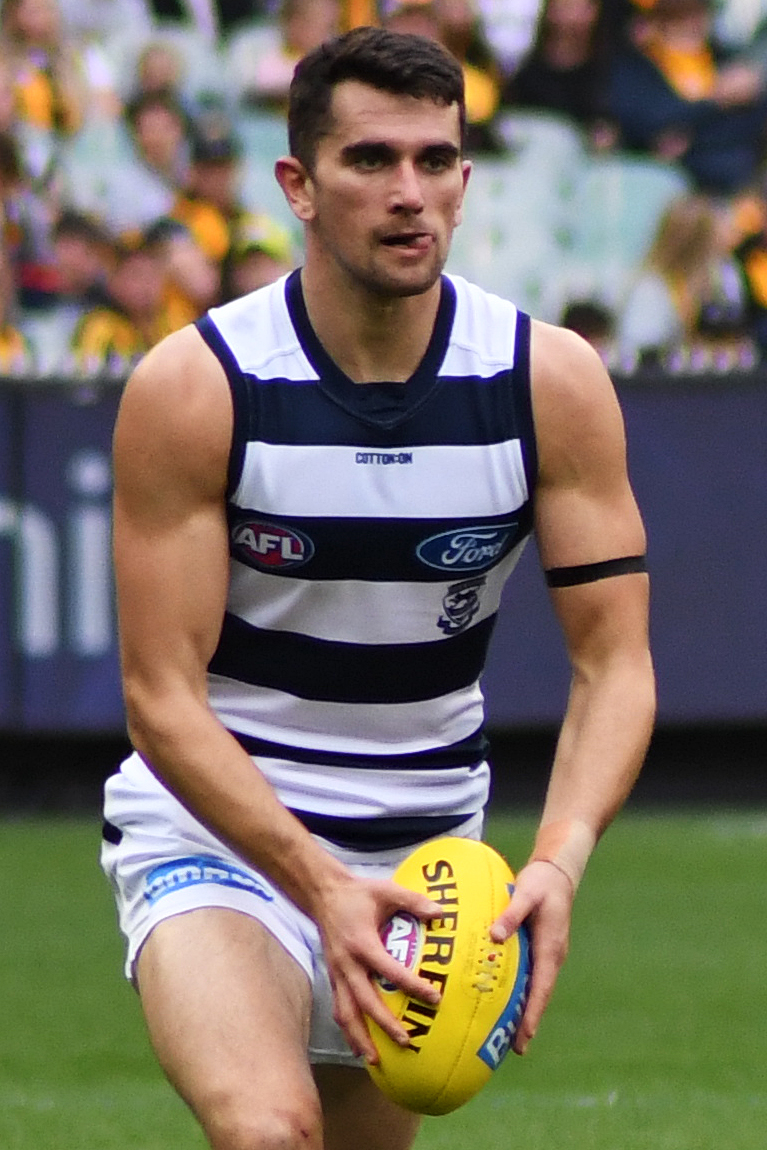
- O'Connor playing for Geelong in April 2019

Personal information
- Full name: Mark O'Connor
- Born: 17 January 1997 (age 29); Daingean Uí Chúis, County Kerry, Ireland
- Original team: Dingle (club)/Kerry (county team)
- Debut: Round 8, 2017, Geelong vs. Essendon, at MCG
- Height: 191 cm (6 ft 3 in)
- Weight: 87 kg (192 lb)
- Position: Defender / midfielder

Club information
- Current club: Geelong
- Number: 42

Playing career^{1}
| Years | Club | Games (Goals) |
| 2017– | Geelong | 169 (14) |
- ^{1} Playing statistics correct to the end of 2026.

Career highlights
- AFL premiership player: 2022

Mark O'Connor (Irish: Marc Ó Conchúir; born 17 January 1997) is an Irish dual code footballer, playing at the highest level in both Gaelic football and Australian rules football. In Australia, he is currently playing for the Geelong Football Club in the Australian Football League (AFL). Prior to joining Geelong, he played underage gaelic football for Dingle GAA and Kerry GAA. He also plays senior club football for Dingle between AFL seasons and most recently helped his team to their first All-Ireland Senior Club Football Championship in 2026.

== Early life ==
O'Connor is a native of Daingean Uí Chúis, a town in an Irish-speaking region of County Kerry, Ireland. Mark is the youngest of three boys, with his brothers John and David still living in Ireland. Prior to leaving for Australia, O'Connor studied commerce at University College Cork.

== Gaelic football career ==
=== Dingle underage ===
O’Connor grew up playing for his local club, Dingle. He won two Kerry minor club football championships in 2014 and 2015.

=== Kerry underage ===
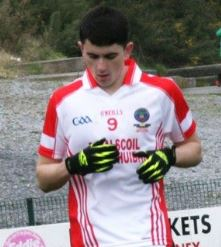
O'Connor while playing Gaelic football

O'Connor is noted for his high fielding ability in Gaelic football, being described as one of the brightest stars in Kerry football prior to his move to Australia. O'Connor won two All-Ireland minor football medals with Kerry in 2014 and 2015. He captained the side and won the Man of the Match award in the 2015 final.

=== Pobalscoil Chorca Dhuibhne ===
He also won two Hogan Cup titles with his school Pobalscoil Chorca Dhuibhne in 2014 and 2015.

=== Senior Kerry future ===
As of 2017, O'Connor reportedly hoped to represent the Kerry senior football team in the future. Colm O'Rourke wrote after the 2019 All-Ireland Senior Football Championship Final loss to Dublin that O'Connor was the midfielder Kerry "badly need to take some of the load off David Moran".

=== Dingle GAA ===
O'Connor played for his club, Dingle GAA, on a number of occasions during the AFL off season.

A 77 year county title wait was ended by Dingle in 2025. On 26 August 2025 in Austin Stack Park, Paul Geaney captained Dingle in a 2-13 to 1-12 win versus Austin Stacks. O'Connor started at midfield and received a black card in the first half. On his return to play he played a role in their victory.

== Australian rules career ==
Having had trials at five AFL sides, North Melbourne, Melbourne and Geelong all expressed interest in acquiring his services. He was drafted by Geelong from the Kerry GAA in Ireland as a category B rookie in October 2016. He made his debut in the seventeen-point loss against Essendon at the Melbourne Cricket Ground in round eight of the 2017 AFL season.

In 2022, he and Zach Tuohy became only the second and third Irish players to win an AFL title, following Tadhg Kennelly in 2005.

== Statistics ==
Updated to the end of round 22, 2026.

Legend
| G | Goals | K | Kicks | D | Disposals | T | Tackles |
| B | Behinds | H | Handballs | M | Marks |
| # | Played in that season's premiership team |

| Season | Team | No. | Games | Totals | | | | | | | Averages (per game) | | | | | | | Votes |
| Season | Team | No. | Games | G | B | K | H | D | M | T | G | B | K | H | D | M | T | Votes |
|---|---|---|---|---|---|---|---|---|---|---|---|---|---|---|---|---|---|---|
| 2017 | Geelong | 42 | 2 | 0 | 0 | 4 | 17 | 21 | 4 | 5 | 0.0 | 0.0 | 2.0 | 8.5 | 10.5 | 2.0 | 2.5 | 0 |
| 2018 | Geelong | 42 | 5 | 0 | 0 | 37 | 21 | 58 | 23 | 9 | 0.0 | 0.0 | 7.4 | 4.2 | 11.6 | 4.6 | 1.8 | 0 |
| 2019 | Geelong | 42 | 23 | 1 | 0 | 195 | 127 | 322 | 104 | 61 | 0.0 | 0.0 | 8.5 | 5.5 | 14.0 | 4.5 | 2.7 | 0 |
| 2020 (Note: The 2020 season was played with 17 home-and-away matches per team (down from 22) and 16-minute quarters with time on (down from 20-minute quarters with time on) due to the impact of the COVID-19 pandemic.) | Geelong | 42 | 21 | 2 | 0 | 158 | 79 | 237 | 87 | 30 | 0.1 | 0.0 | 7.5 | 3.8 | 11.3 | 4.1 | 1.4 | 0 |
| 2021 | Geelong | 42 | 14 | 1 | 0 | 111 | 95 | 206 | 48 | 40 | 0.1 | 0.0 | 7.9 | 6.8 | 14.7 | 3.4 | 2.9 | 1 |
| 2022^{#} | Geelong | 42 | 22 | 0 | 4 | 171 | 106 | 277 | 84 | 56 | 0.0 | 0.2 | 7.8 | 4.8 | 12.6 | 3.8 | 2.5 | 0 |
| 2023 | Geelong | 42 | 22 | 3 | 2 | 186 | 123 | 309 | 96 | 68 | 0.1 | 0.1 | 8.5 | 5.6 | 14.0 | 4.4 | 3.1 | 0 |
| 2024 | Geelong | 42 | 13 | 2 | 3 | 87 | 68 | 155 | 50 | 40 | 0.2 | 0.2 | 6.7 | 5.2 | 11.9 | 3.8 | 3.1 | 0 |
| 2025 | Geelong | 42 | 25 | 1 | 4 | 224 | 122 | 346 | 126 | 66 | 0.0 | 0.2 | 9.0 | 4.9 | 13.8 | 5.0 | 2.6 | 0 |
| 2026 | Geelong | 42 | 18 | 4 | 3 | 144 | 122 | 266 | 85 | 38 | 0.2 | 0.2 | 8.0 | 6.8 | 14.8 | 4.7 | 2.1 | 0 |
| Career | | | 165 | 14 | 16 | 1317 | 880 | 2197 | 707 | 413 | 0.1 | 0.1 | 8.0 | 5.3 | 13.3 | 4.3 | 2.5 | 1 |

== Honours and achievements ==
Kerry

- All-Ireland Minor Football Championship:
  - (2): 2014, 2015 (c)
- Munster Minor Football Championship:
  - (2): 2014, 2015 (c)

Dingle

- All-Ireland Senior Football Championship:
  - (1): 2026
- Munster Senior Football Championship:
  - (1): 2025
- Kerry Senior Football Championship:
  - (1): 2025
- Kerry Club Football Championship: 2023
- Kerry Minor Football Championship:
  - (2): 2014, 2015

Geelong

- AFL Premiership:
  - (1): 2022
- McClelland Trophy:
  - (2): 2019, 2022
