= Zach Tuohy =

Australian rules footballer and Gaelic footballer

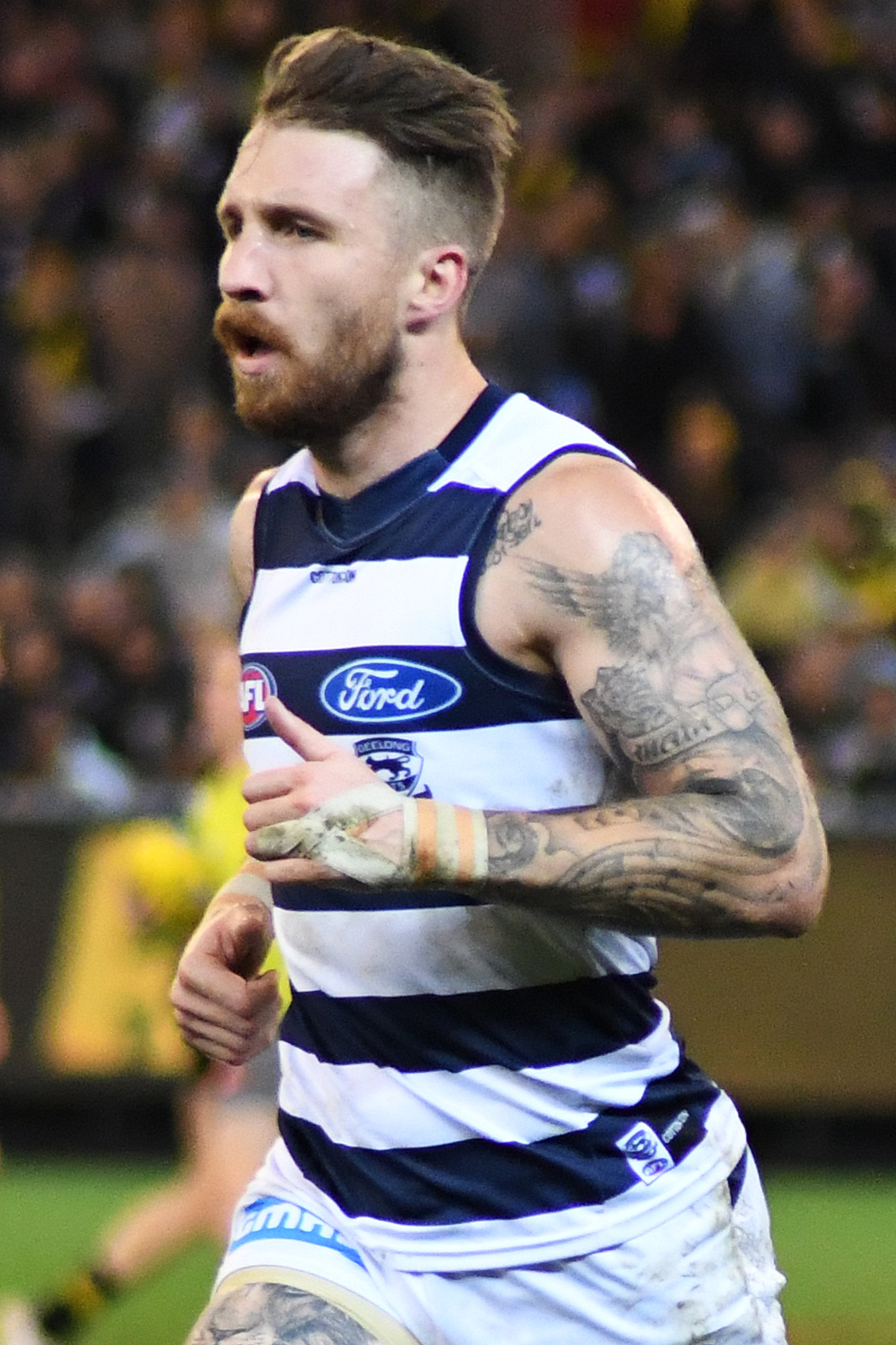
- Tuohy playing for Geelong in August 2018

Personal information
- Full name: Zach Tuohy
- Born: 10 December 1989 (age 36); Portlaoise, Laois, Ireland
- Original team: Portlaoise (club)/Laois (county team)
- Draft: No. 73 2010 rookie draft
- Debut: Round 11, 2011, Carlton vs. Port Adelaide, at Football Park, Adelaide
- Height: 187 cm (6 ft 2 in)
- Weight: 93 kg (205 lb)
- Position: Defender / wing

Playing career
Years	Club	Games (Goals)
2011–2016	Carlton	120 (40)
2017–2024	Geelong	168 (61)
Total		288 (101)

Representative team honours
Years	Team	Games (Goals)
2020	All Stars	1 (0)

International team honours
2011–2017	Ireland	4 (1)

Career highlights
- AFL premiership player: 2022; VFL/AFL games record for an Irish player

Zach Tuohy (born 10 December 1989) is an Irish former professional Australian rules footballer who played for the Geelong Football Club and Carlton Football Club in the Australian Football League (AFL).

Tuohy grew up in Portlaoise, County Laois, Ireland, and played Gaelic football before making a code switch to Australian rules football. He is regarded as one of the greatest Irish players in the history of the AFL, with the highest number of games played of any non-Australian-born player.

In 2022, Tuohy and Mark O'Connor (from Kerry) became the second and third Irish players in AFL history to win a premiership by winning the 2022 AFL Grand Final with Geelong. Tadhg Kennelly won the first for Ireland in 2005 with the Sydney Swans.

== Gaelic football ==
Tuohy began his sporting career as a Gaelic footballer at the Portlaoise club, and became a regular in underage Laois county sides. He won a Leinster Minor Football Championship with them in 2007.

Tuohy represented Ireland in International rules football in the 2011, 2013 and 2017 series. He scored a goal in the first Test in 2013 at Breffni Park.

== Australian football ==
=== Carlton ===
Tuohy attracted the attention of Australian rules football recruiters from the Carlton Football Club in the AFL, a club based in the inner city of Melbourne. During 2009, Tuohy travelled to Melbourne to undergo a four-week trial with the club, which was sufficiently impressed to offer Tuohy an International Rookie contract. This contract ensured Tuohy would be recruited by Carlton; he was then selected with the club's sixth-round selection in the 2010 AFL rookie draft (No. 73 overall) as a formality. Tuohy became the fourth Irish player to spend time on the Carlton list, and was only the second to play a senior game.

Tuohy began the 2010 season playing in Carlton's VFL-affiliate, the Northern Bullants. He developed as a tagger, and then as a rebounding half-back. He was temporarily elevated to the senior list in place of the injured Luke Mitchell in early 2011, and he made his AFL debut in Round 11 against Port Adelaide, going on to play eleven games for the season. By 2012, he was a regular in the Carlton team and, in 2013, he played in every match, finishing seventh in the club, best and fairest award, the John Nicholls Medal. Over time, Tuohy became noted for his long, accurate kicking, and regularly drifted from the backline to half-forward to kick long goals from beyond the 50m line. He had shown a similar aptitude for long-range kicking in Gaelic football, in which he was his county's designated kicker for 45m plus free kicks.

Tuohy had a strong season in 2015, running third in the John Nicholls Medal count, and being selected as the small defender in the 2015 AFL Coaches Association All-Australian team, by polling the most votes of any small defender in the AFL Coaches Association MVP award. He played his 100th game in early 2016, becoming only the fifth Irish player in the league to reach that milestone.

=== Geelong ===
At the conclusion of the 2016 season, Tuohy requested a trade from Carlton and nominated Geelong as his preferred destination. He was officially traded to Geelong in October.

On 21 July 2018, Tuohy took a contested mark with 10 seconds of play remaining and then kicked a goal after the siren to secure Geelong a two-point victory against Melbourne. He played his 200th game against Richmond on 11 September 2020, becoming just the second-ever Irish AFL player to reach that milestone, being preceded by Jim Stynes. Tuohy played his 250th game in the 2022 Grand Final, also winning his first premiership.

He and Mark O'Connor became only the second and third Irish players to win an AFL premiership, following Tadhg Kennelly in 2005.

In October 2022, Tuohy signed a new one-year contract extension with Geelong. In Round 17, 2023, Tuohy played his 265th game against North Melbourne, overtaking Jim Stynes with the most AFL games played by an Irish-born footballer.

In August 2024, Tuohy announced his retirement from AFL football at the conclusion of the 2024 AFL season.

== Personal life ==
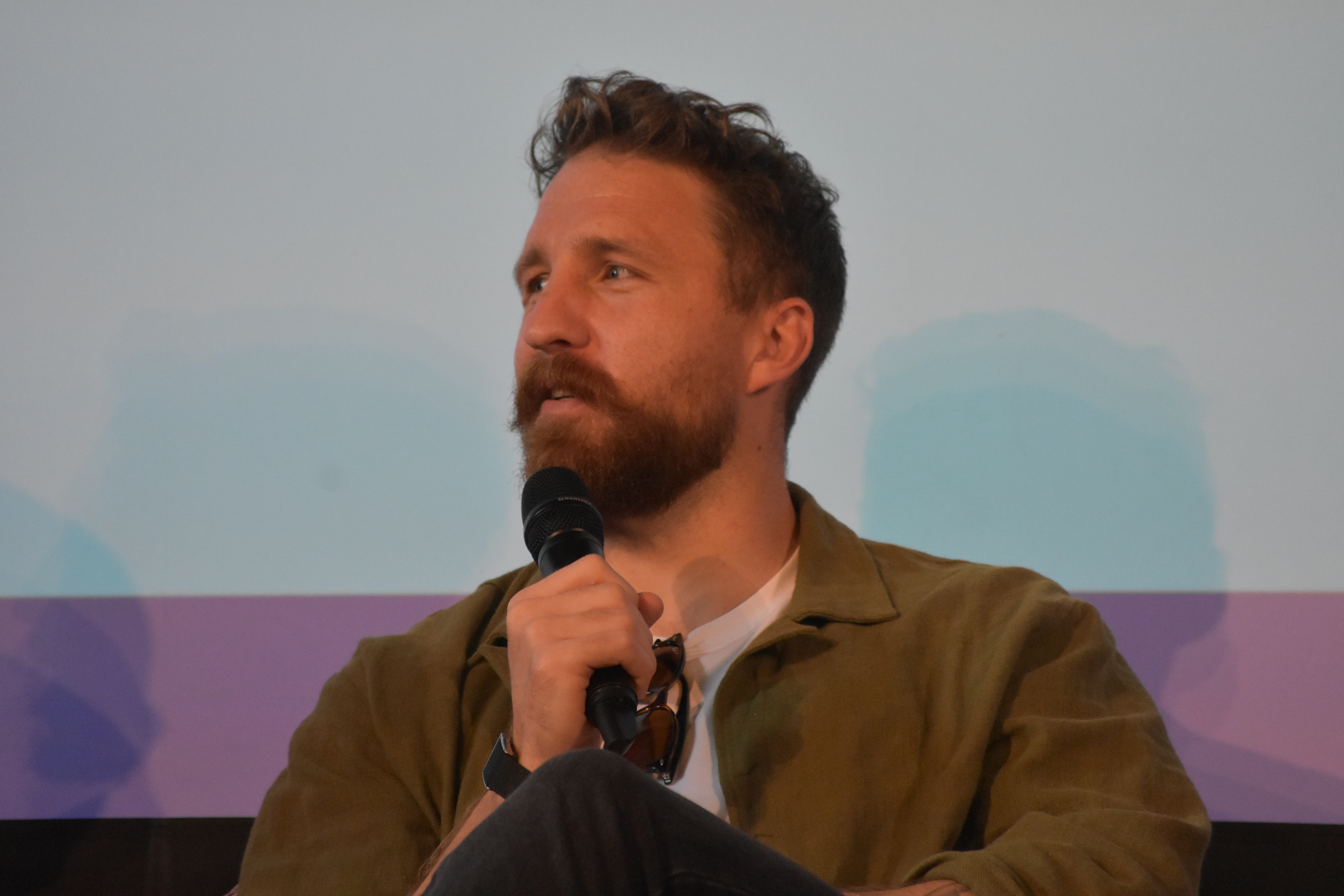
Tuohy in 2025 at Queenscliffe Literary Festival

Tuohy's father Noel was a member of Laois County Council and ran in the 2020 Irish general election.

Tuohy married his partner, Rebecca Price, in Ireland at the end of 2022. He is involved in business in Portlaoise, including a coffee shop.

Zach Tuohy's autobiography, The Irish Experiment, co-written with journalist Catherine Murphy, was released in 2024.

== Statistics ==
Legend
G	Goals	K	Kicks	D	Disposals	T	Tackles
B	Behinds	H	Handballs	M	Marks
#	Played in that season's premiership team

Season	Team	No.	Games	Totals							Averages (per game)							Votes
Season	Team	No.	Games	G	B	K	H	D	M	T	G	B	K	H	D	M	T	Votes
2011	Carlton	42	11	3	1	74	64	138	31	9	0.3	0.1	6.7	5.8	12.5	2.8	0.8	0
2012	Carlton	42	19	5	1	129	79	208	39	60	0.3	0.1	6.8	4.2	10.9	2.1	3.2	0
2013	Carlton	42	24	13	9	182	123	305	51	61	0.5	0.4	7.6	5.1	12.7	2.1	2.5	0
2014	Carlton	42	22	4	6	195	113	308	64	31	0.2	0.3	8.9	5.1	14.0	2.9	1.4	0
2015	Carlton	42	22	9	3	239	175	414	107	24	0.4	0.1	10.9	8.0	18.8	4.9	1.1	2
2016	Carlton	42	22	6	5	275	168	443	80	48	0.3	0.2	12.5	7.6	20.1	3.6	2.2	0
2017	Geelong	2	25	6	8	375	240	615	115	45	0.2	0.3	15.0	9.6	24.6	4.6	1.8	2
2018	Geelong	2	23	10	3	336	168	504	117	29	0.4	0.1	14.6	7.3	21.9	5.1	1.3	0
2019	Geelong	2	18	3	10	252	98	350	78	17	0.2	0.6	14.0	5.4	19.4	4.3	0.9	0
2020 (Note: The 2020 season was played with 17 home-and-away matches per team (down from 22) and 16-minute quarters with time on (down from 20-minute quarters with time on) due to the impact of the COVID-19 pandemic.)	Geelong	2	19	8	8	234	82	316	74	17	0.4	0.4	12.3	4.3	16.6	3.9	0.9	0
2021	Geelong	2	21	11	8	326	155	481	112	26	0.5	0.4	15.5	7.4	22.9	5.3	1.2	4
2022^{#}	Geelong	2	24	9	6	351	169	520	120	44	0.4	0.3	14.6	7.0	21.7	5.0	1.8	5
2023	Geelong	2	20	6	9	248	115	363	71	32	0.3	0.5	12.4	5.8	18.2	3.6	1.6	0
2024	Geelong	2	18	8	4	192	88	280	54	23	0.4	0.2	10.7	4.9	15.6	3.0	1.3	0
Career			288	101	81	3408	1837	5245	1113	466	0.4	0.3	11.8	6.4	18.2	3.9	1.6	13

== Honours and achievements ==
Team

- AFL premiership player (Geelong): 2022
- 2× McClelland Trophy (Geelong): 2019, 2022

Individual

- All Stars Representative Honours in Bushfire Relief Match: 2020
- 3× Ireland international rules football team: 2011, 2013, 2017

== See also ==
- List of Carlton Football Club players
- List of Geelong Football Club players
- List of players who have converted from one football code to another
