= 2015 Geelong Football Club season =

Geelong Football Club
2015 season
- President: Colin Carter
- Coach: Chris Scott (5th season)
- Captains: Joel Selwood (4th season)
- Home ground: Simonds Stadium
- AFL season: 10th
- Finals series: Did not qualify
- Highest home attendance: 55,802 vs. Hawthorn (Round 20)
- Lowest home attendance: 20,813 vs. Gold Coast (Round 3)
- Club membership: 44,312

The 2015 Geelong Football Club season was the club's 116th season of senior competition in the Australian Football League (AFL). The club also fielded its reserves team in the Victorian Football League (VFL) for the 16th season. It was the club's first season since 2006 to not make the top 8.

== Club personnel ==
Joel Selwood was appointed the club's captain for a fourth successive season, with Harry Taylor retaining the role of vice-captain. Additionally, Andrew Mackie and Tom Hawkins remain in the player leadership group from the prior season, with Corey Enright the sole promotion to the group. Mitch Duncan, Steve Johnson, James Kelly and Mathew Stokes were not included in the group from the previous season – partly due to the club deciding to reduce the number of player leadership positions.

Chris Scott continues as the club's senior coach for his fifth season, after signing a two-year contract extension in August 2014 extending his tenure until the end of 2017. Following the departure of football manager Neil Balme to the vacant Collingwood football director position, his assistant Steve Hocking was promoted to football manager in November 2014.

The coaching department underwent a restructure prior to the season, with Matthew Knights promoted to assistant coach after three seasons as the club's VFL coach. Knights will coach the midfield group alongside existing assistant coach Nigel Lappin, and joins the assistant coaching team of Dale Amos (backline), James Rahilly (forwards) and Blake Caracella (in his new portfolio of attack and defence strategy). Paul Hood assumes an expanded role, replacing Knights as VFL coach as well continuing in his position as the club's academy co-ordinator. The club's academy coaching panel, overseen by Hood, consists of existing development coach Max Rooke, as well as new additions Shane O'Bree (moving from the assistant coaching panel) and former Geelong player Matthew Scarlett (in a part-time role).

=== Playing list ===
Despite no player retirements at the conclusion of the 2014 AFL season, Geelong made a number of changes to its playing list, delisting Mitch Brown, George Burbury, Joel Hamling, Taylor Hunt, Jordan Schroder, Jackson Sheringham and Jesse Stringer. Additionally, Nick Bourke was removed from the club's rookie list.

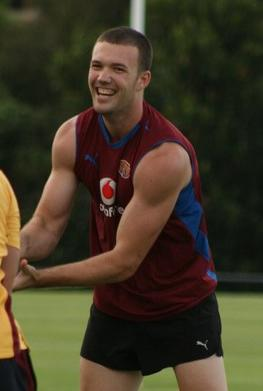
Former Brisbane Lions and Melbourne player Mitch Clark joined Geelong in the off-season trade period.

Geelong were involved in four incoming and outgoing trades during the annual trade period, the first of which resulted in Allen Christensen being traded to the Brisbane Lions in exchange for pick 21 in the upcoming National Draft. The club also traded dual premiership player Travis Varcoe to Collingwood as part of a three-club trade that netted Mitch Clark from Melbourne, and gained Rhys Stanley and pick 60 in the Draft in a separate deal with St Kilda in exchange for pick 21. The final trade resulted in Geelong swapping draft picks 14 and 35 to Adelaide for picks 10 and 47—attaining the club's first top-10 draft selection since the 2006 AFL draft. Additionally, the club recruited former Melbourne player Sam Blease as a delisted free agent.

A total of four players were drafted by Geelong in the 2014 National Draft: Nakia Cockatoo (pick 10), Cory Gregson, (48), Dean Gore (55) and Jordan Cunico (59). Following the elevation of Mark Blicavs to the senior list, Geelong also drafted Tom Read (pick 14) and Cameron Delaney (32) in the 2015 Rookie Draft, as well as Padraig Lucey (49)—a participant in the reality television series The Recruit. Geelong did not participate in the corresponding Pre-season Draft.

As part of its list management strategy, Geelong elected to list its six eligible players as veterans, meaning the club is able to pay a fixed amount per veteran outside the salary cap. The six players—who must have completed 10 seasons with the club to qualify—were Jimmy Bartel, Corey Enright, Steve Johnson, James Kelly, Tom Lonergan and Andrew Mackie.

After spending time away from the club to consider his future, Brad Hartman decided to leave the club in May 2015 due to his struggles in meeting the professional standards required of an AFL player. Hartman had only played five senior games for Geelong – all during the 2014 season. In the same month, rookie-listed player James Toohey also decided to retire from senior-level football, citing a desire to return to full-time university studies.

Due to the long-term injury of Lincoln McCarthy, rookie-listed Michael Luxford was upgraded to the senior list on 27 May 2015 and immediately selected as an emergency for Geelong's round nine match against West Coast. Luxford made his AFL debut the following round against Essendon, when he was included as a late change replacing an injured Rhys Stanley.

Ruckman Hamish McIntosh announced his retirement in July 2015, due to a recurrence of an ankle injury that had hampered his three seasons at the club. After playing 107 games for North Melbourne, McIntosh ultimately played 19 games for Geelong—all during the 2014 season. This was followed by two more retirements due to injury, Jared Rivers (who required surgery on a torn meniscus in the knee) and Sam Blease (due to a delayed concussion sustained in a VFL match during the season).

It was announced prior to Geelong's final match of the season that veteran players Steve Johnson, James Kelly and Mathew Stokes would not be offered new contracts for the 2016 season. The trio all played their farewell match against Adelaide at Simonds Stadium, with Geelong winning by 39 points.

==== Statistics ====
Players are listed in alphabetical order by surname, and statistics are for AFL regular season and finals series matches during the 2015 AFL season only.

^	Denotes player who is on the club's rookie list.
#	Denotes nominated rookie where player has been elevated to club's senior list during season, and therefore eligible for senior selection.
†	Denotes player who is on the club's veteran list
	Denotes statistical category leader for season

Geelong's 2015 playing list and statistics
Player	#	AFL debut	Games	Goals	Behinds	Kicks	Handballs	Disposals	Marks	Tackles
Jimmy Bartel^{†}	3	2002	11	0	1	127	132	259	69	43
Zac Bates^	43	—N/a	0	0	0	0	0	0	0	0
Jed Bews	24	2014	16	1	2	70	85	155	35	50
Sam Blease	12	2011	1	0	0	4	3	7	2	0
Mark Blicavs	46	2013	21	4	6	156	226	382	96	126
Josh Caddy	23	2011	19	16	17	200	188	388	70	106
Mitch Clark	19	2006	8	14	6	59	28	87	35	16
Nakia Cockatoo	5	2015	11	3	5	31	47	37	29	19
Josh Cowan	18	2011	2	1	1	8	10	18	3	1
Jordan Cunico	31	—N/a	0	0	0	0	0	0	0	0
Cameron Delaney^	45	2012	0	0	0	0	0	0	0	0
Mitch Duncan	22	2010	11	8	3	105	130	235	62	26
Corey Enright^{†}	44	2001	21	0	1	301	183	484	148	60
Dean Gore	15	—N/a	0	0	0	0	0	0	0	0
Cory Gregson	28	2015	20	13	8	133	114	247	66	63
Cameron Guthrie	29	2011	21	13	7	192	261	453	69	110
Brad Hartman	36	2014	0	0	0	0	0	0	0	0
Tom Hawkins	26	2007	19	46	20	145	51	196	93	43
George Horlin-Smith	33	2012	7	2	1	29	70	99	15	21
Jarrad Jansen	35	—N/a	0	0	0	0	0	0	0	0
Steve Johnson^{†}	20	2002	20	30	25	256	156	412	99	47
James Kelly^{†}	9	2002	17	1	7	185	163	348	80	71
Shane Kersten	39	2014	11	9	7	47	50	87	37	28
Jake Kolodjashnij	8	2015	9	0	1	58	68	126	34	25
Darcy Lang	11	2014	20	14	5	151	120	271	63	55
Tom Lonergan^{†}	13	2005	19	2	1	162	113	275	119	25
Padraig Lucey^	42	—N/a	0	0	0	0	0	0	0	0
Michael Luxford^{#}	37	2015	2	0	0	3	5	8	1	3
Andrew Mackie^{†}	4	2004	15	6	0	203	112	315	104	27
Lincoln McCarthy	6	2012	0	0	0	0	0	0	0	0
Hamish McIntosh	17	2005	0	0	0	0	0	0	0	0
Daniel Menzel	10	2010	2	4	2	13	12	25	6	2
Steven Motlop	32	2010	20	26	16	299	142	441	78	68
Jordan Murdoch	21	2012	18	8	3	168	113	281	69	53
Tom Read^	38	—N/a	0	0	0	0	0	0	0	0
Jared Rivers	25	2003	12	0	0	99	66	165	77	25
Joel Selwood	14	2007	20	14	8	237	254	491	61	124
Dawson Simpson	16	2010	4	0	0	8	18	26	2	11
Billie Smedts	2	2012	4	0	0	19	23	42	16	11
Rhys Stanley	1	2010	8	6	2	53	46	99	26	22
Mathew Stokes	27	2006	14	4	2	135	132	267	58	33
Harry Taylor	7	2008	21	1	3	207	161	368	159	39
Jackson Thurlow	40	2013	19	2	0	189	140	329	84	42
James Toohey^	41	—N/a	0	0	0	0	0	0	0	0
Nathan Vardy	30	2011	3	5	0	19	20	39	13	8
Josh Walker	34	2012	16	19	10	88	67	155	61	26

== Season summary ==
=== Pre-season matches ===
Geelong's 2015 NAB Challenge fixture
Match	Date and local time	Opponent	Scores^{[a]}			Venue	Attendance	Source
Match	Date and local time	Opponent	Home	Away	Result	Venue	Attendance	Source
1	Sunday, 1 March (3:40 pm)	Gold Coast	0.10.19 (79)	1.9.8 (71)	Lost by 8 points	Tony Ireland Stadium [A]	4,431	
2	Thursday, 12 March (7:10 pm)	Adelaide	1.12.6 (87)	0.9.14 (68)	Won by 19 points	Simonds Stadium [H]	8,019	
3	Sunday, 22 March (4:10 pm)	Carlton	2.10.14 (92)	0.17.9 (111)	Won by 19 points	Etihad Stadium [A]	10,631	

=== Regular season ===
Geelong's 2015 AFL season fixture
Round	Date and local time	Opponent	Home	Away	Result	Venue	Attendance	Ladder position
Round	Date and local time	Opponent	Scores^{[a]}			Venue	Attendance	Ladder position
1	Monday, 6 April (3:20 pm)	Hawthorn	17.21 (123)	8.13 (61)	Lost by 62 points	MCG [A]	73,584	17th
2	Sunday, 12 April (1:10 pm)	Fremantle	9.6 (60)	15.14 (104)	Lost by 44 points	Simonds Stadium [H]	23,723	18th
3	Sunday, 19 April (3:20 pm)	Gold Coast	16.9 (105)	13.18 (96)	Won by 9 points	Simonds Stadium [H]	20,813	15th
4	Sunday, 26 April (3:20 pm)	North Melbourne	9.13 (67)	12.11 (83)	Lost by 16 points	Simonds Stadium [H]	23,452	16th
5	Saturday, 2 May (1:45 pm)	Richmond	11.10 (76)	12.13 (85)	Won by 9 points	MCG [A]	45,228	14th
6	Friday, 8 May (7:50 pm)	Collingwood	8.11 (59)	15.10 (100)	Won by 41 points	MCG [A]	52,152	12th
7	Saturday, 16 May (7:20 pm)	Sydney	18.12 (120)	11.11 (77)	Lost by 43 points	ANZ Stadium [A]	28,063	13th
8	Friday, 22 May (7:50 pm)	Carlton	22.8 (140)	9.9 (63)	Won by 77 points	Etihad Stadium [H]	32,032	10th
9	Sunday, 31 May (2:40 pm)	West Coast	16.24 (120)	10.4 (64)	Lost by 56 points	Domain Stadium [A]	37,676	12th
10	Saturday, 6 June (7:20 pm)	Essendon	7.11 (53)	19.8 (122)	Won by 69 points	Etihad Stadium [A]	40,632	10th
11	Friday, 12 June (7:20 pm)	Port Adelaide	11.3 (69)	14.8 (92)	Won by 23 points	Adelaide Oval [A]	47,058	9th
12	Saturday, 21 June (3:20 pm)	Melbourne	13.11 (89)	18.5 (113)	Lost by 24 points	Simonds Stadium [H]	28,007	10th
13	Bye							10th
14	Sunday, 5 July (2:50 pm)	Adelaide	Match cancelled^{[b]}		Draw	Adelaide Oval [A]	—N/a	10th
15	Saturday, 11 July (7:20 pm)	North Melbourne	18.12 (120)	11.13 (79)	Lost by 41 points	Etihad Stadium [A]	31,270	11th
16	Saturday, 18 July (1:45 pm)	Western Bulldogs	10.12 (72)	9.10 (64)	Won by 8 points	Simonds Stadium [H]	25,041	11th
17	Saturday, 25 July (1:45 pm)	Greater Western Sydney	6.6 (42)	9.15 (69)	Won by 27 points	StarTrack Oval [A]	14,667	10th
18	Saturday, 1 August (1:45 pm)	Brisbane Lions	17.11 (113)	8.9 (57)	Won by 56 points	Simonds Stadium [H]	21,914	8th
19	Saturday, 8 August (7:20 pm)	Sydney	14.11 (95)	9.9 (63)	Won by 32 points	Simonds Stadium [H]	27,910	8th
20	Saturday, 15 August (7:20 pm)	Hawthorn	12.13 (85)	19.7 (121)	Lost by 36 points	MCG [H]	55,802	9th
21	Saturday, 22 August (7:20 pm)	St Kilda	14.13 (97)	15.7 (97)	Draw	Etihad Stadium [A]	25,245	9th
22	Friday, 28 August (7:45 pm)	Collingwood	9.8 (62)	17.8 (110)	Lost by 48 points	MCG [H]	40,582	11th
23	Saturday, 5 September (1:05 pm)	Adelaide	17.17 (119)	11.14 (80)	Won by 39 points	Simonds Stadium [H]	26,128	10th

==== Ladder ====
Pos	Team	Pld	W	L	D	PF	PA	PP	Pts	Qualification
1	Fremantle	22	17	5	0	1857	1564	118.7	68	Finals series
2	West Coast	22	16	5	1	2330	1572	148.2	66	Finals series
3	Hawthorn (P)	22	16	6	0	2452	1548	158.4	64	Finals series
4	Sydney	22	16	6	0	2006	1578	127.1	64	Finals series
5	Richmond	22	15	7	0	1930	1568	123.1	60	Finals series
6	Western Bulldogs	22	14	8	0	2101	1825	115.1	56	Finals series
7	Adelaide	21	13	8	0	2107	1821	115.7	54 (Note: The round 14 match between Adelaide and Geelong was cancelled due to the death of Adelaide coach Phil Walsh, and both teams were awarded two premiership points each.)	Finals series
8	North Melbourne	22	13	9	0	2062	1937	106.5	52	Finals series
9	Port Adelaide	22	12	10	0	2002	1874	106.8	48	
10	Geelong	21	11	9	1	1853	1833	101.1	48	
11	Greater Western Sydney	22	11	11	0	1872	1891	99.0	44	
12	Collingwood	22	10	12	0	1972	1856	106.3	40	
13	Melbourne	22	7	15	0	1573	2044	77.0	28	
14	St Kilda	22	6	15	1	1695	2162	78.4	26	
15	Essendon	22	6	16	0	1580	2134	74.0	24	
16	Gold Coast	22	4	17	1	1633	2240	72.9	18	
17	Brisbane Lions	22	4	18	0	1557	2306	67.5	16	
18	Carlton	22	4	18	0	1525	2354	64.8	16	

Rules for classification: 1) points; 2) percentage; 3) number of points for.
(P) Premiers

=== Finals series ===
After finishing tenth on the ladder, Geelong failed to qualify for the 2015 AFL finals series; as a result, it was the first time the club had not played in the finals since the 2006 AFL season.

== Honours ==
=== Awards ===
The following club awards were presented at the Carji Greeves Medal Night on 8 October:

- Carji Greeves Medal – Mark Blicavs
- Best Young Player – Darcy Lang
- Coach's Award – Steve Johnson
- Community Champion – Corey Enright
- Tom Harley Award (Best Clubman) – Andrew Mackie
- VFL Best and Fairest – Tom Ruggles

Other honours:

- Leading goalkicker – Tom Hawkins (46 goals)
- Most club votes in the Brownlow Medal – Joel Selwood (13 votes; ineligible)

=== Milestones ===
- Round 1 – Mitch Clark (Geelong debut); Nakia Cockatoo (AFL debut); Cory Gregson (AFL debut)
- Round 2 – Rhys Stanley (Geelong debut)
- Round 3 – Chris Scott (100 games coached); Mitch Clark (100 games)
- Round 4 – Tom Hawkins (150 games)^{[c]}
- Round 5 – Mark Blicavs (50 games)
- Round 6 – Tom Lonergan (150 games)
- Round 7 – Sam Blease (Geelong debut)
- Round 10 – Jordan Murdoch (50 games); Michael Luxford (AFL debut)
- Round 12 – Corey Enright (300 games); Jake Kolodjashnij (AFL debut)
- Round 19 – Joel Selwood (200 games)
- Round 20 – Steve Johnson (250 games)

=== Other ===
- Round 2 – George Horlin-Smith (2015 AFL Mark of the Year nomination)
- Round 4 – Mitch Clark (2015 AFL Mark of the Year nomination)
- Round 6 – Cory Gregson (2015 AFL Rising Star nomination); Jordan Murdoch (2015 AFL Goal of the Year nomination)
- Round 9 – Steve Johnson (2015 AFL Goal of the Year nomination)
- Round 10 – James Kelly (AFL Life Membership)
- Round 12 – Joel Selwood (2015 AFL Goal of the Year nomination)
- Round 18 – Steve Johnson scored two goals to place him third in Geelong's all-time goalkickers rankings, overtaking former player Billy Brownless' 441 career goals.
- Round 19 – Jackson Thurlow (2015 AFL Rising Star nomination); Nakia Cockatoo (2015 AFL Mark of the Year nomination)
- Round 20 – Cameron Guthrie (2015 AFL Goal of the Year nomination)
- Round 21 – Darcy Lang (2015 AFL Rising Star nomination)
- Round 22 – Daniel Menzel (2015 AFL Mark of the Year nomination); Steven Motlop (2015 AFL Goal of the Year nomination)
- Round 23 – Steve Johnson (2015 AFL Goal of the Year nomination)

== Match Review Panel charges ==
Match Review Panel (MRP) and AFL Tribunal cases involving Geelong players during the 2015 AFL season
Round	Player	Charge category	Victim (club)	Verdict	Fine (A$)	Suspension	Source
Round	Player	Charge category	Victim (club)	Verdict	Sanction		Source
1	Steve Johnson	Rough conduct	Sam Mitchell (Hawthorn)	Guilty (early plea)	$1,000	—N/a	
2	Mitch Duncan	Tripping	Nat Fyfe (Fremantle)	Guilty (early plea)	$1,000	—N/a	
2	Billie Smedts	Striking	Lee Spurr (Fremantle)	Guilty (early plea)	—N/a	1 match	
10	Joel Selwood	Careless umpire contact	Shaun Ryan (umpire)	Guilty (early plea)	$1,000	—N/a	
12	Mathew Stokes	Careless umpire contact	Chris Donlon (umpire)	Guilty (early plea)	$1,500	—N/a	
15	Joel Selwood	Rough conduct	Sam Wright (North Melbourne)	Guilty (early plea)	—N/a	1 match	
18	Steve Johnson	Striking	Allen Christensen (Brisbane Lions)	Guilty (early plea)	—N/a	1 match	
18	James Kelly	Careless umpire contact	Shaun Ryan (umpire)	Guilty (early plea)	$1,000	—N/a	
22	Steve Johnson	Rough conduct	Nathan Brown (Collingwood)	Guilty (early plea)	$1,500	—N/a	
22	James Kelly	Striking	Alex Fasolo (Collingwood)	Guilty (early plea)	$1,000	—N/a	

== VFL season ==
=== Squad ===
The 2015 VFL squad was finalised in March 2015, and consists of 23 players—15 of whom were retained from the prior season—as well an additional development squad consisting of three players. Jackson Sheringham, delisted from the club's senior list at the conclusion of the 2014 season, is one of the notable additions to the VFL playing list. In addition to this squad of players, senior and rookie-listed players for Geelong's AFL team are eligible for selection in VFL matches.

50. Ryan Williams
51. Jackson Sheringham
52. Jack Hollmer
53. Matthew Farrelly
54. Cameron Tudor
55. Simon Close
56. Mitch Herbison
57. Tom Ruggles
58. Fraser Fort
59. Tom Maas
60. Sandy Robinson
61. Ben Raidme
62. Daniel Measures
63. Zak Sherman
64. Tom Atkins
65. Daniel Gibbs
66. Stephen Bensted
67. Keiran Paliouras
68. Nick Dixon
69. Dane McFarlane
70. Brenton Rees
71. Brant Hainz
72. Paul Burchell

Development squad

- Josh Guthrie
- Ryley Stuhldreier
- Marcus Thompson

In a departure from tradition, the club appointed a leadership group to share the captaincy role throughout the season. The group consisted four of the squad's experienced players: Jack Hollmer, Ben Raidme, Jackson Sheringham and Ryan Williams.

=== Results ===
==== Practice matches ====
Geelong's 2015 VFL practice matches
Match	Date and local time	Opponent	Scores^{[a]}			Venue	Source
Match	Date and local time	Opponent	Home	Away	Result	Venue	Source
1	Saturday, 14 March (12:00 pm)	Collingwood	16.7 (103)	9.9 (63)	Won by 40 points	Simonds Stadium [H]	
2	Saturday, 21 March (12:00 pm)	Richmond	19.10 (124)	5.7 (37)	Won by 87 points	Simonds Stadium [H]	
3	Saturday, 4 April (11:00 am)	Footscray Bulldogs	15.8 (98)	22.11 (143)	Lost by 45 points	Simonds Stadium [H]	
4	Saturday, 11 April (12:00 pm)	Essendon	19.5 (119)	13.7 (85)	Lost by 34 points	True Value Solar Centre [A]	

==== Regular season ====
Geelong's 2015 VFL season fixture
Round	Date and local time	Opponent	Home	Away	Result	Venue	Ladder position	Source
Round	Date and local time	Opponent	Scores^{[a]}			Venue	Ladder position	Source
1	Friday, 17 April (7:30 pm)	Werribee	12.12 (84)	10.6 (66)	Won by 18 points	Simonds Stadium^{[d]} [H]	3rd	
2	Bye						4th	
3	Saturday, 2 May (11:00 am)	Richmond	12.11 (101)	16.13 (109)	Won by 8 points	ME Bank Centre [A]	4th	
4	Saturday, 9 May (6:00 pm)	Collingwood	12.11 (83)	14.8 (92)	Lost by 9 points	Queen Elizabeth Oval [H]	7th	
5	Saturday, 16 May (2:00 pm)	Footscray	17.13 (115)	8.5 (53)	Lost by 62 points	VU Whitten Oval [A]	13th	
6	Saturday, 23 May (12:00 pm)	Port Melbourne	13.20 (98)	15.13 (103)	Lost by 5 points	Simonds Stadium [H]	12th	
7	Saturday, 30 May (12:00 pm)	Williamstown	12.8 (80)	11.16 (82)	Lost by 2 points	Simonds Stadium [H]	11th	
8	Saturday, 6 June (3:25 pm)	Essendon	19.21 (135)	6.7 (43)	Lost by 92 points	Etihad Stadium [A]	12th	
9	Saturday, 13 June (2:00 pm)	North Ballarat	15.12 (102)	14.9 (93)	Won by 9 points	Simonds Stadium [H]	10th	
10	Saturday, 20 June (2:00 pm)	Coburg	7.12 (54)	12.12 (84)	Won by 30 points	Piranha Park [A]	10th	
11	Bye						11th	
12	Saturday, 4 July (2:00 pm)	Casey	14.9 (93)	6.9 (45)	Lost by 48 points	Casey Fields [A]	11th	
13	Saturday, 11 July (12:00 pm)	Werribee	7.9 (51)	7.11 (53)	Won by 2 points	Avalon Airport Oval^{[d]} [A]	10th	
14	Sunday, 19 July (11:30 am)	Footscray	10.9 (69)	15.5 (95)	Lost by 26 points	Simonds Stadium [H]	11th	
15	Saturday, 25 July (11:00 am)	Essendon	13.8 (86)	15.9 (99)	Lost by 13 points	Simonds Stadium [H]	11th	
16	Sunday, 2 August (2:00 pm)	Frankston	6.9 (45)	16.20 (116)	Won by 71 points	Frankston Oval [A]	10th	
17	Sunday, 9 August (1:30 pm)	North Ballarat	11.10 (76)	4.5 (29)	Lost by 47 points	Eureka Stadium [A]	11th	
18	Saturday, 15 August (11:00 am)	Box Hill	10.11 (71)	19.7 (121)	Lost by 50 points	Simonds Stadium [H]	12th	
19	Sunday, 23 August (2:00 pm)	Sandringham	14.17 (101)	11.7 (73)	Lost by 28 points	Trevor Barker Beach Oval [A]	12th	
20	Saturday, 29 August (11:00 am)	Northern Blues	19.13 (127)	6.10 (46)	Won by 81 points	Simonds Stadium [H]	11th	

===== Ladder =====
2015 VFL ladder
Pos	Team	Pld	W	L	D	PF	PA	PP	Pts	
1	Box Hill Hawks	18	14	4	0	1797	1184	151.8	56	Finals series
2	Sandringham	18	14	4	0	1678	1357	123.7	56	Finals series
3	Williamstown (P)	18	13	5	0	1764	1283	137.5	52	Finals series
4	Footscray	18	12	6	0	1708	1282	133.2	48	Finals series
5	Essendon	18	12	6	0	1680	1355	124.0	48	Finals series
6	Collingwood	18	12	6	0	1633	1491	109.5	48	Finals series
7	Werribee	18	11	7	0	1555	1345	115.6	44	Finals series
8	Casey Scorpions	18	9	9	0	1382	1352	102.2	36	Finals series
9	North Ballarat	18	8	10	0	1389	1499	92.7	32	
10	Port Melbourne	18	7	11	0	1626	1597	101.8	28	
11	Geelong	18	7	11	0	1405	1568	89.6	28	
12	Coburg	18	7	11	0	1299	1565	83.0	28	
13	Richmond	18	5	13	0	1336	1605	83.2	20	
14	Northern Blues	18	4	14	0	1319	1787	73.8	16	
15	Frankston	18	0	18	0	1008	2309	43.7	0	

Source: Ladder for 2015 Peter Jackson VFL
Rules for classification: 1) points; 2) percentage; 3) number of points for.
(P) Premiers

==== Finals series ====
After finishing 11th on the ladder, Geelong failed to qualify for the 2015 VFL finals series.

== Notes ==
Key

- H Home match.
- A Away match.

Notes

- **^{a}** Geelong's scores are indicated in **bold** font.
- **^{b}** The match between Adelaide and Geelong in Round 14 was cancelled, and declared a draw, following the death of Adelaide coach Phil Walsh.
- **^{c}** Tom Hawkins was originally selected for his 150th game in Round 3, but was a late withdrawal following the death of his mother, Jennifer. After spending time with his family, Hawkins opted to return the following week and play his milestone game in Round 4 against North Melbourne.
- **^{d}** The venue for Geelong's opening round match against Werribee was changed from Werribee's home ground of Avalon Airport Oval to Simonds Stadium after the condition of the ground was not ready for a VFL match. Consequently, the Round 12 match between the two clubs was moved from Simonds Stadium to Avalon Airport Oval.
