= 2018 Geelong Football Club season =

Football club season

Geelong Football Club
2018 season
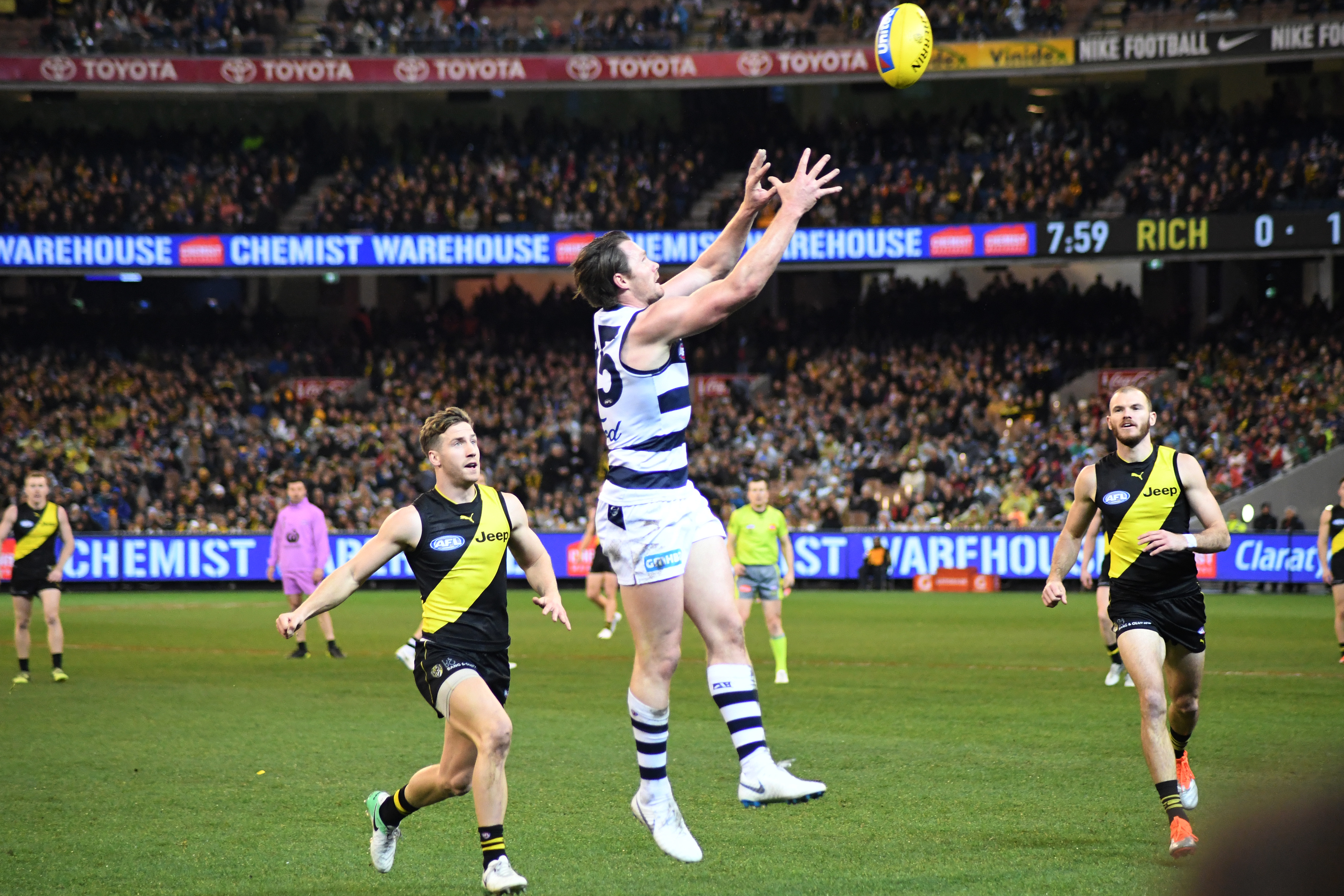
- Patrick Dangerfield preparing to mark the ball during the Cats' round 20 match
- President: Colin Carter
- Coach: Chris Scott (8th season)
- Captains: Joel Selwood (7th season)
- Home ground: GMHBA Stadium
- AFL season: 8th
- Finals series: Elimination final
- Best and Fairest: Mark Blicavs
- Leading goalkicker: Tom Hawkins (60)
- Highest home attendance: 73,189 vs. Hawthorn (Round 2)
- Lowest home attendance: 24,507 vs. Fremantle (Round 22)
- Average home attendance: 34,207
- Club membership: 63,818

The 2018 season was the Geelong Football Club's 119th in the Australian Football League (AFL). It was the club's eighth season under senior coach Chris Scott, with Joel Selwood appointed as club captain for a seventh successive year. Geelong (known as the Cats) participated in both the inaugural AFLX competition and the 2018 JLT Community Series as part of their pre-season schedule, and the club's regular season began on 25 March against Melbourne at the Melbourne Cricket Ground (MCG). The Cats finished the home-and-away season with a 13–9 win–loss record and placed eighth on the league's ladder, qualifying for the 2018 finals series as a result. Geelong were defeated in an elimination final against Melbourne by 29 points, and therefore did not progress past the first finals week.

Mark Blicavs was named Geelong's best and fairest player, polling 234 votes for the Carji Greeves Medal ahead of joint runners-ups Patrick Dangerfield and Tim Kelly on 233.5 votes each. It was Blicavs' second Carji Greeves Medal, having previously won the award for the 2015 season. Tom Hawkins was the club's leading goalkicker for the seventh successive season, scoring 60 goals. Dangerfield and Tom Stewart were selected in the 2018 All-Australian team, with Stewart also receiving the AFL Coaches Association's Best Young Player award. The Cats also fielded a reserves team in the Victorian Football League (VFL) and a women's team in the VFL Women's (VFLW) competition. The women's team finished runners-up after they were defeated in the VFLW Grand Final by Hawthorn.

== Background ==
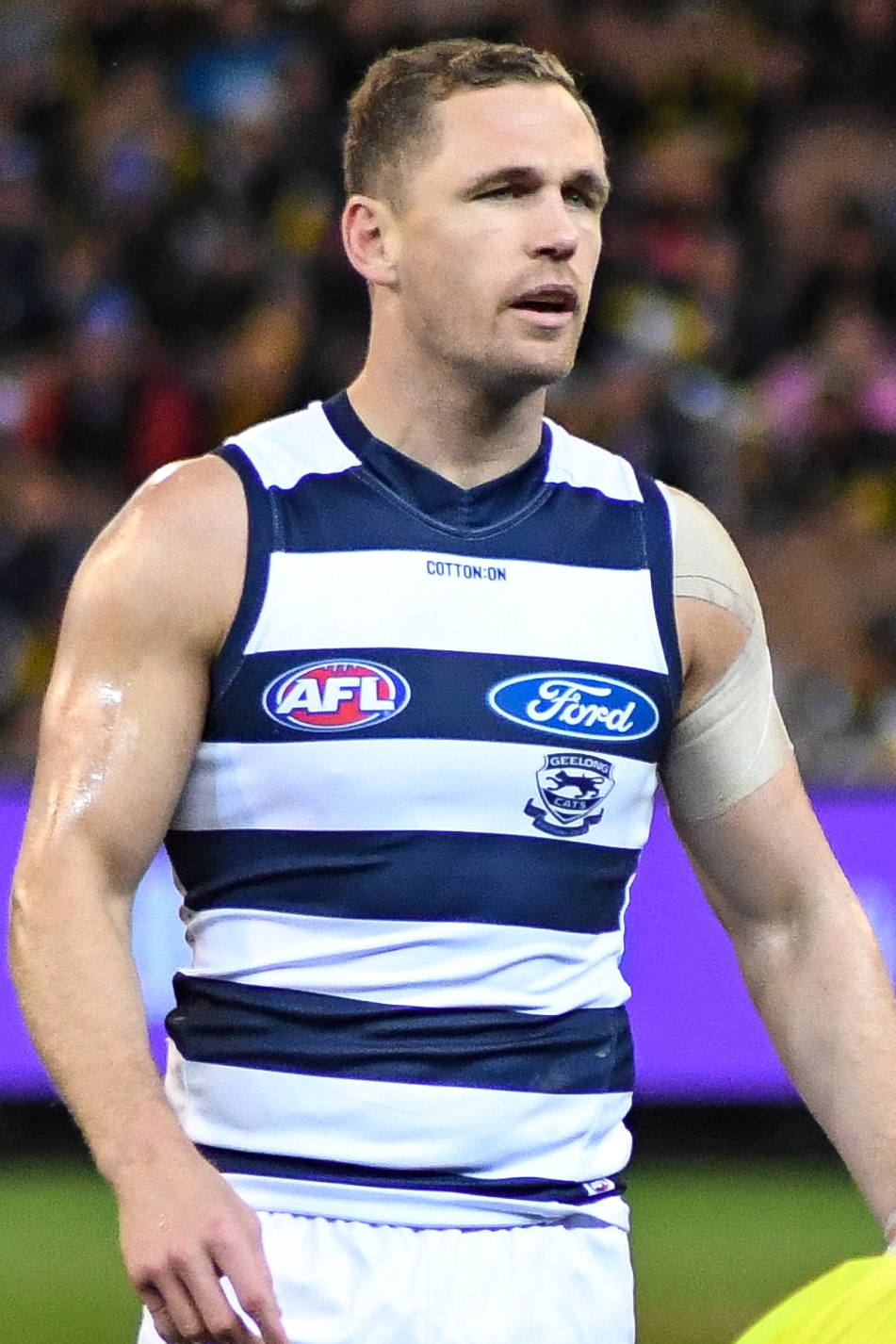
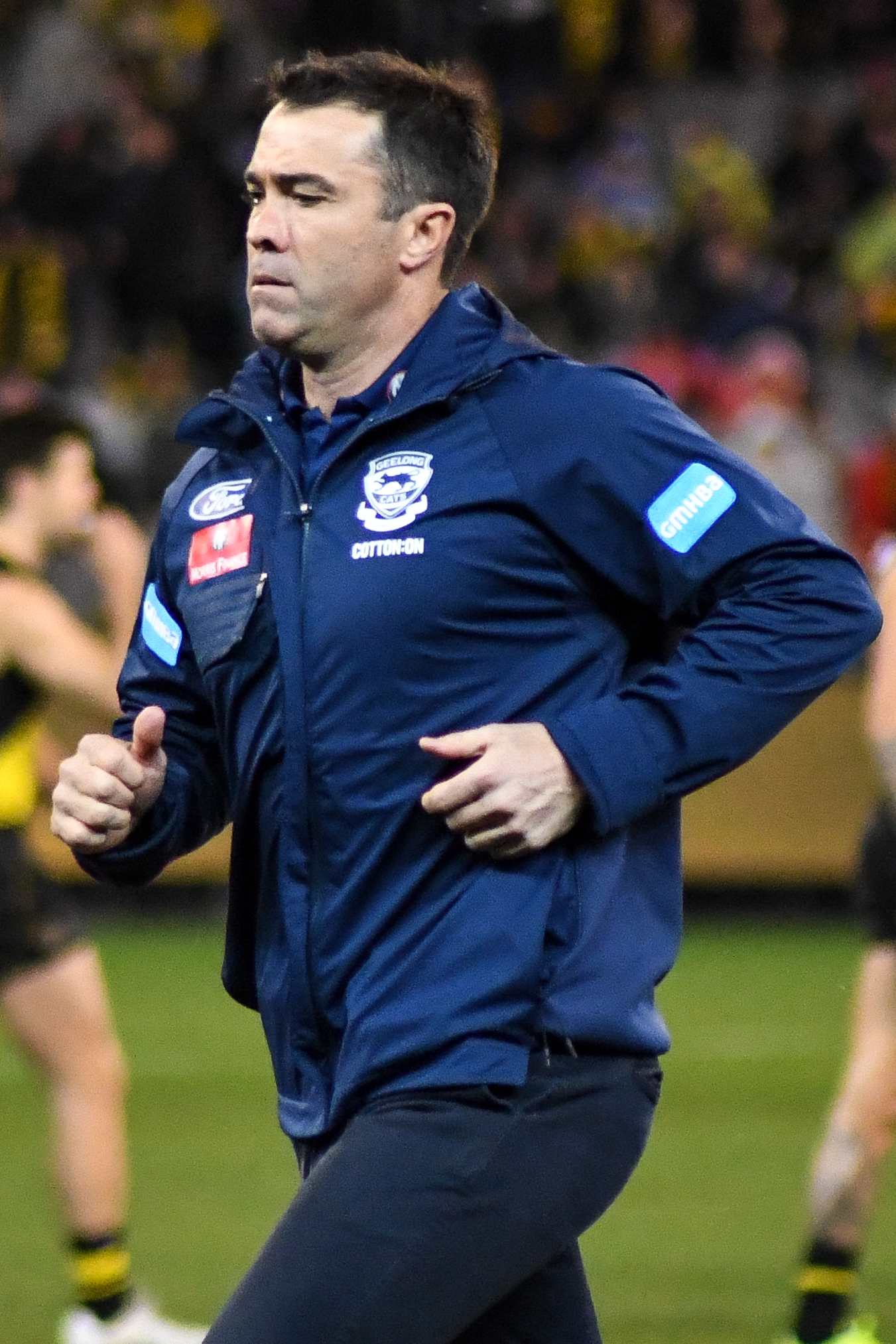
Joel Selwood (captain) and Chris Scott (coach)

Chris Scott continued as the club's senior coach for an eighth season, after signing a contract in April 2017 extending his tenure until the end of 2019; during the season, Scott agreed to a new contract to extend this period until the end of 2022. The Cats had four assistant coaches this season, each responsible for specific positions: James Rahilly (forward line), Matthew Knights and Nigel Lappin (midfield), Matthew Scarlett (back line). Corey Enright was also a member of the coaching panel, fulfilling the role of development coach for Geelong's young players. After spending two seasons as the club's director of coaching, Simon Lloyd was appointed to the role of Geelong's football department manager in September 2017, replacing Steve Hocking who had vacated the position to become the AFL's head of football operations.

Joel Selwood was appointed the club's captain for a seventh successive season, with Patrick Dangerfield and Harry Taylor retaining the roles of vice-captain and deputy vice-captain respectively. They were supported by a leadership group made up of teammates Mark Blicavs, Mitch Duncan and Scott Selwood, who all remained in the group from the prior season, with Zach Tuohy the sole promotion to the group.

Ford Australia was the major sponsor of the club for the 2018 season, continuing a long-running deal that started in 1925. GMHBA was the new naming rights sponsor for the Cats' home ground Kardinia Park, with a ten-year deal for the venue to be known as GMHBA Stadium from 2018. Geelong signed up 63,818 members, an increase of 16.3 per cent from the prior year. The average home ground attendance for the Cats this season was 34,207 spectators.

== Playing list ==
=== Changes ===
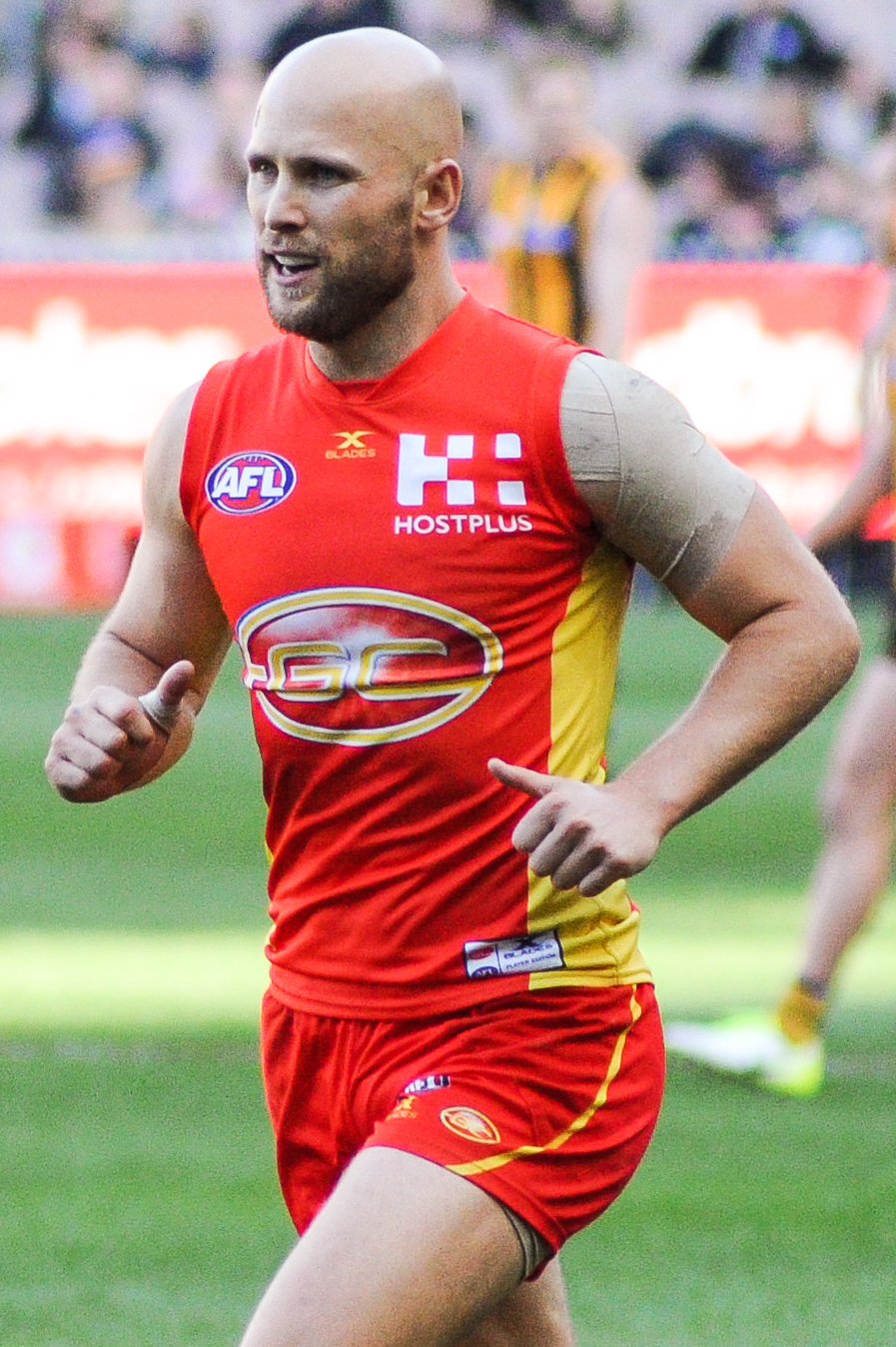
Gary Ablett joined Geelong in the off-season trade period from Gold Coast

Following the retirements of premiership players Tom Lonergan and Andrew Mackie at the end of the 2017 season, Geelong delisted Josh Cowan, Matthew Hayball and Tom Ruggles from their playing list; although the Cats committed to redrafting Hayball via the upcoming rookie draft if he was not offered a contract by another club prior. Conversely, after spending the prior two seasons on the club's rookie list, James Parsons was upgraded to the senior list for 2018.

Geelong were involved in three trades during the annual trade period, the first of which involved the Cats exchanging pick 53 in the upcoming national draft for Richmond's future third-round pick in the 2018 edition. Geelong also traded Darcy Lang to Carlton in exchange for pick 58 and a swap of the clubs' fourth-round selections in 2018. Despite showing interest in Jack Watts (Melbourne) and Jake Stringer (Western Bulldogs), the Cats only gained one player via trade: Gary Ablett from Gold Coast (along with pick 24 and a 2018 fourth-round pick), with Geelong parting with pick 19 and their 2018 second-round pick in return. Ablett played for the Cats from 2002 to 2010, and had previously requested an unsuccessful trade back to Geelong at the end of 2016. Additionally, Steven Motlop departed the club as a restricted free agent, after the Cats opted to accept an end-of-first-round draft pick as compensation instead of matching Port Adelaide's offer to Motlop. This was despite Geelong coach Chris Scott stating prior to the free agency period that he hoped Motlop would remain at the club. Geelong's trade period was labelled a "significant gamble" by Josh Elliott of The Roar due to Ablett's age as a 33-year-old. Nathan Schmook of AFL.com.au rated the Cats' trading a 7 out of 10, given the club held picks 22 and 24 in the draft and "will back themselves to find quality talent" with these selections.

Four players were drafted by the Cats in the 2017 national draft: Lachie Fogarty (pick 22), Tim Kelly (24), Charlie Constable (36) and Gryan Miers (57). Christopher Doerre of ESPN.com.au graded the Cats' draft performance as an A+ reasoning that Fogarty and Kelly were "astute selections", and predicting that Constable and Miers "may be two of the draft day steals". In addition to redrafting Hayball (pick 30), Geelong also selected former Essendon and Western Bulldogs player Stewart Crameri (16) in the 2018 rookie draft. Geelong did not participate in the corresponding pre-season draft.

Deletions from playing list
Player	Reason	Ref.
Tom Lonergan	Retired	
Andrew Mackie	Retired	
Darcy Lang	Traded to Carlton	
Steven Motlop	Restricted free agent (to Port Adelaide)	
Josh Cowan	Delisted	
Matthew Hayball	Delisted (redrafted in rookie draft)	
Tom Ruggles	Delisted	

Additions to playing list
Player	Acquired	Ref.
Gary Ablett	Traded from Gold Coast	
James Parsons	Rookie elevation	
Lachie Fogarty	No. 22, 2017 national draft	
Tim Kelly	No. 24, 2017 national draft	
Charlie Constable	No. 36, 2017 national draft	
Gryan Miers	No. 57, 2017 national draft	
Stewart Crameri	No. 16, 2018 rookie draft	
Matthew Hayball	No. 30, 2018 rookie draft	

=== Statistics ===
Geelong used 40 players from their playing list this season, with six playing in all 23 of the club's games. There was seven players who played in their first AFL game: Ryan Abbott, Lachie Fogarty, Jack Henry, Jamaine Jones, Tim Kelly, Quinton Narkle and Esava Ratugolea. Stewart Crameri also played his first game for the Cats, having previously played for both Essendon and Western Bulldogs. Tom Hawkins was the club's leading goalkicker for the seventh successive season, scoring 60 goals; Hawkins also finished in third position overall for the Coleman Medal, awarded to the league's highest individual goal-scorer during the regular season.

Playing list and statistics
Player	No.	Games	Goals	Behinds	Kicks	Handballs	Disposals	Marks	Tackles	Milestone(s)
Ryan Abbott	45	4	3	3	20	23	43	11	23	AFL debut (round 20)
Gary Ablett	4	19	16	15	296	256	552	85	72	200th Geelong game (round 12)
Jed Bews	24	21	2	2	124	106	230	72	37	
Aaron Black	23	3	0	0	23	17	40	17	9	
Mark Blicavs	46	23	1	3	153	182	335	91	76	
Wylie Buzza	12	3	1	2	10	12	22	9	7	
Nakia Cockatoo	5	2	0	2	14	11	25	6	4	
Charlie Constable	18	0	—N/a	—N/a	—N/a	—N/a	—N/a	—N/a	—N/a	
Stewart Crameri^	36	4	5	3	27	19	46	20	9	Geelong debut / 100th game (round 7)
Jordan Cunico	31	14	4	6	164	93	257	64	30	
Patrick Dangerfield	35	22	24	23	305	314	619	82	102	
Mitch Duncan	22	21	7	8	315	238	553	133	74	
Lachie Fogarty	13	15	5	12	109	90	199	37	52	AFL debut (round 1)
Ryan Gardner	20	0	—N/a	—N/a	—N/a	—N/a	—N/a	—N/a	—N/a	
Cory Gregson	28	10	3	4	57	36	93	22	34	
Cameron Guthrie	29	13	3	0	99	113	212	34	39	
Zach Guthrie^	39	7	0	0	50	32	82	25	11	
Tom Hawkins	26	21	60	29	212	113	325	153	40	
Matthew Hayball^	15	0	—N/a	—N/a	—N/a	—N/a	—N/a	—N/a	—N/a	
Lachie Henderson	25	7	0	0	70	37	107	31	17	
Jack Henry^	38	22	8	4	160	73	233	84	66	AFL debut (round 2)
George Horlin-Smith	33	4	3	0	34	31	65	7	15	50th game (round 8)
Timm House	30	0	—N/a	—N/a	—N/a	—N/a	—N/a	—N/a	—N/a	
Jamaine Jones^	41	7	4	2	30	30	60	14	26	AFL debut (round 10)
Tim Kelly	11	23	24	16	277	249	526	77	81	AFL debut (round 1)
Jake Kolodjashnij	8	23	0	2	154	136	290	95	42	50th game (round 3)
Lincoln McCarthy	6	2	2	3	14	8	22	5	4	
Sam Menegola	27	23	22	12	283	259	542	126	103	50th game (round 21)
Daniel Menzel	10	13	27	15	100	41	141	51	14	
Gryan Miers	32	0	—N/a	—N/a	—N/a	—N/a	—N/a	—N/a	—N/a	
Jordan Murdoch	21	16	9	8	147	91	238	68	58	100th game (round 10)
Quinton Narkle	19	6	5	2	31	42	73	13	14	AFL debut (round 15)
Mark O'Connor^{#}	42	5	0	0	37	21	58	23	9	
Brandan Parfitt	3	19	15	7	164	178	342	50	85	
James Parsons	34	11	9	7	70	64	134	32	24	
Esava Ratugolea	17	8	7	7	37	32	69	26	15	AFL debut (round 1)
Joel Selwood	14	23	7	13	298	323	621	94	124	250th game (round 1)
Scott Selwood	16	13	3	1	80	135	215	40	69	
Sam Simpson^	37	1	0	0	3	4	7	3	2	
Zac Smith	9	3	1	0	9	20	29	5	8	
Rhys Stanley	1	15	6	3	99	103	202	44	42	
Tom Stewart	44	22	1	1	296	146	442	132	46	
Harry Taylor	7	8	4	4	58	39	97	30	12	
Jackson Thurlow	40	7	3	0	68	41	109	31	14	
Zach Tuohy	2	23	10	3	336	168	504	117	29	

Key
^	Denotes player who was on the club's standard rookie list, and therefore eligible for senior selection.
#	Denotes Category B rookie where player needed to be elevated to club's senior list during this season to be eligible for senior selection.

== Season summary ==
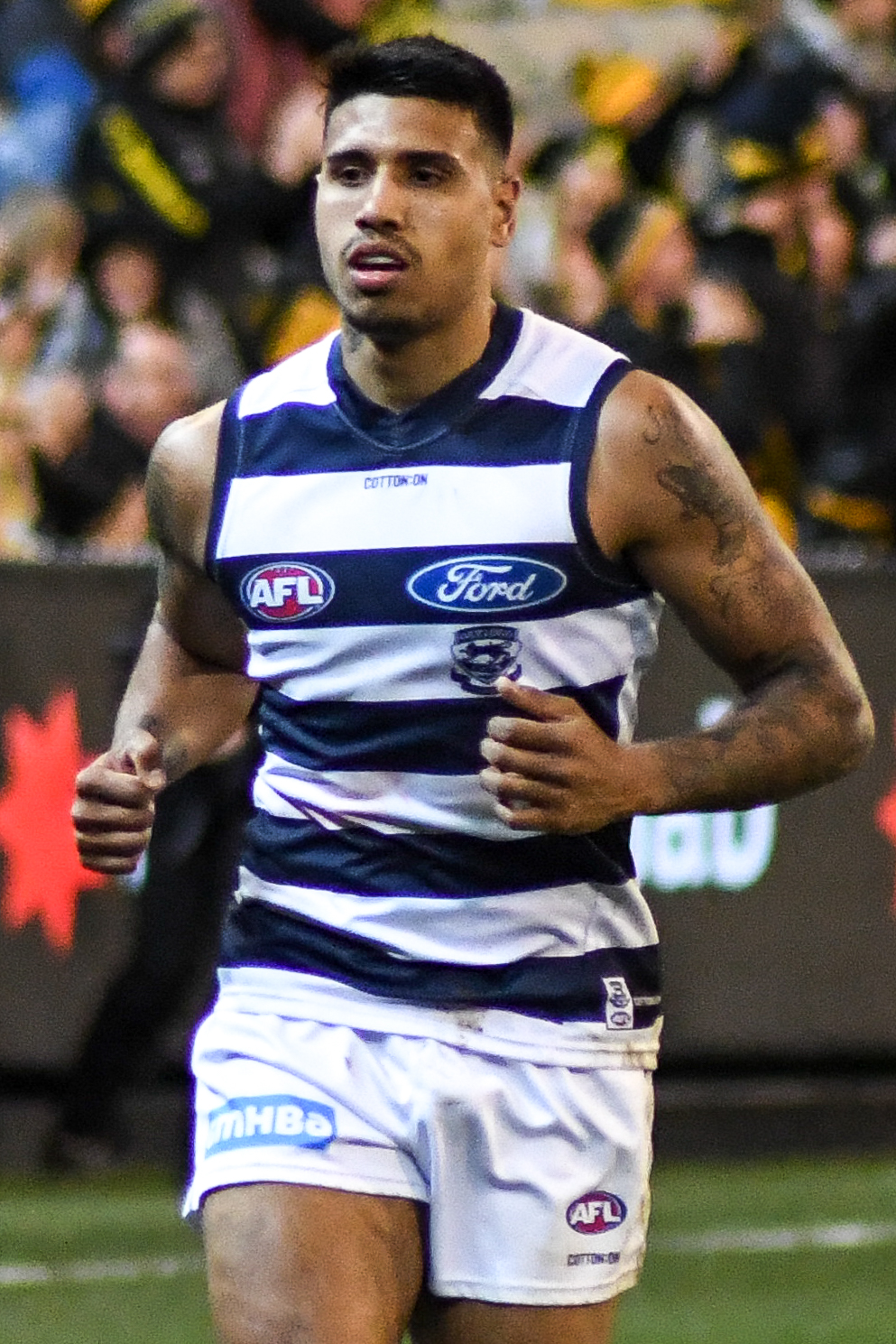
Tim Kelly played his debut game in round one, and finished joint runner-up for the Carji Greeves Medal.

The fixture for the 2018 season was confirmed by the AFL in October 2017; Geelong were scheduled to play nine games at GMHBA Stadium. This was an increase from the previous season where the Cats played seven games at their home ground. Although uncertain of the impact of Gary Ablett's return to Geelong, Peter Ryan of The Age predicted that the Cats would "qualify high" for the finals due to having "nine home games and a quality midfield". This assessment was reflected in the annual pre-season survey of captains conducted by AFL.com.au, with eight out of the other 17 club captains expecting that Geelong would qualify for the finals this season.

The inaugural AFLX competition was played in February 2018, with games following AFLX rules (which is a modified version of Australian rules football). For this competition, clubs were split into three groups consisting of two pools in each; the top team in each pool played off in a grand final for that group. Geelong won both their pool matches, against Port Adelaide and Fremantle, before losing to Adelaide by eight points in the group grand final; the Cats also participated in the 2018 JLT Community Series as part of their pre-season schedule, playing in two games against Gold Coast and Essendon.

Geelong began the regular season on 25 March against Melbourne at the MCG, with the Cats narrowly winning by three points. Midfielders Joel Selwood and Gary Ablett each garnered 39 disposals in the win; Selwood was playing his 250th game and it was Ablett's return game for the Cats. In the lead-up to the following week's match against Hawthorn on Easter Monday, there was anticipation about Ablett, Selwood and Patrick Dangerfield taking the field together for the first time, with the midfielders labelled the "holy trinity". Dangerfield collected 31 disposals in his first game back from injury, combining with Ablett (35) and Selwood (29) as the three players with the most disposals for the Cats. Despite the impact of this trio, Hawthorn secured a one-point win—although their lead was as much as 25 points early in the final quarter. Travelling to newly-opened Optus Stadium in round 3, the Cats lost to West Coast by 15 points; the crowd of 54,535 was the highest attendance for a sports event in Western Australia. Selwood captained his 143rd match in round 4, surpassing Reg Hickey's 78-year-old record of most games as Geelong captain; the Cats defeated St Kilda in their first game at GMHBA Stadium for the season.

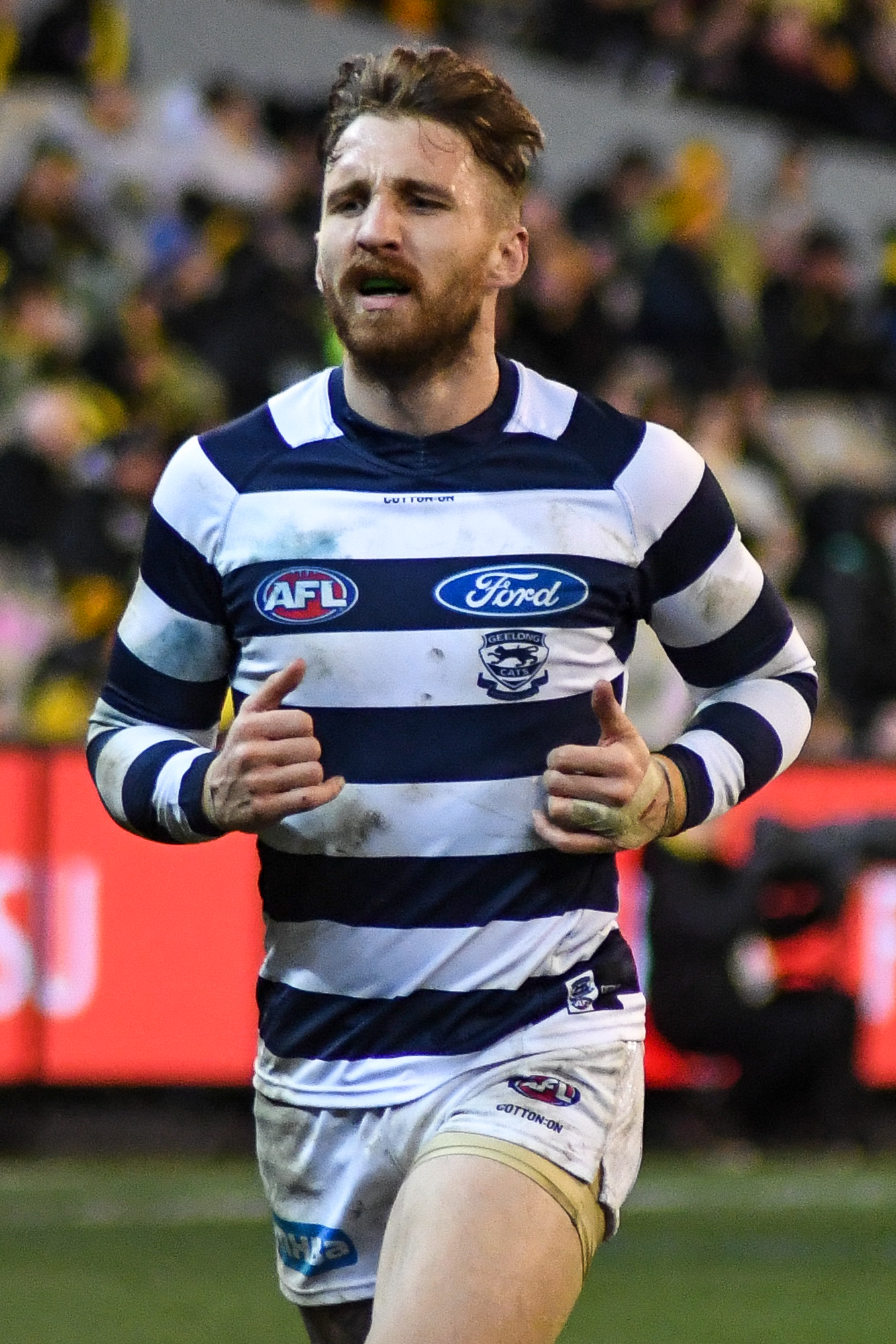
Zach Tuohy kicked the winning goal after the siren against Melbourne in round 18.

Geelong won three of their next five matches, with the round 6 game against Sydney their sole loss at GMHBA Stadium for the season. Playing against Carlton in round 10, debutant Jamaine Jones scored his first goal with his first kick and the Cats won by 28 points; it was Carlton's first game at GMHBA Stadium since 1997. Geelong won their next two games, including an 85-point win against Gold Coast; the Cats subsequently recorded an 18-point loss in round 13 to reigning premiers Richmond. Heading into their bye in round 14, Geelong were placed fifth on the league's ladder with an 8–5 win–loss record.

Geelong were defeated by Western Bulldogs in their first match following their week off, losing by two points after Cats defender Harry Taylor missed a goal after the siren; it was the seventh consecutive year the Cats had lost after a mid-season bye. Three weeks later Geelong had another opportunity to win after the siren against Melbourne in round 18; this time Zach Tuohy scored a goal for the Cats to win by two points. Geelong recorded a 42-point against Brisbane in round 19, with Tom Hawkins scoring seven goals for a second consecutive game. Geelong's loss in round 20 was the first time Richmond had defeated the Cats twice in a single season since 1982. Geelong's score of 24.14 (158) against Fremantle in round 21 was their highest of the season, with the Cats recording a VFL/AFL record of 23 unanswered goals; the 133-point margin was Fremantle's biggest defeat in the club's history. This dominance was repeated the following week, with the Cats finishing the regular season with a 102-point win over Gold Coast.

These final two wins helped the Cats place eighth on the league's ladder with a 13–9 win–loss record, qualifying for the 2018 finals series. Geelong were defeated in an elimination final against Melbourne by 29 points, and therefore did not progress past the first finals week; it was Melbourne's first finals appearance since 2006. In a post-season review for AFL.com.au, Mitch Cleary described the Cats' season as one that "promised so much but delivered little", and graded their overall performance a "D".

=== Results ===
Table of AFLX competition results
Game	Date	Result	Score				Opponent	Score				Ground	Attendance
Game	Date	Result	S	G	B	T	Opponent	S	G	B	T	Ground	Attendance
1	15 February	Won	3	6	6	72	Port Adelaide	5	1	4	60	Coopers Stadium, Adelaide	10,253
2	15 February	Won	4	2	5	57	Fremantle	3	1	4	40	Coopers Stadium, Adelaide	10,253
GFX	15 February	Lost	2	4	3	47	Adelaide	3	3	7	55	Coopers Stadium, Adelaide	10,253

Table of regular season results
Round	Date	Result	Score			Opponent	Score			Ground		Attendance	Ladder
Round	Date	Result	G	B	T	Opponent	G	B	T	Ground		Attendance	Ladder
1	25 March	Won	14	13	97	Melbourne	13	16	94	Melbourne Cricket Ground	A	54,112	9th
2	2 April	Lost	18	9	117	Hawthorn	17	16	118	Melbourne Cricket Ground	H	73,189	10th
3	8 April	Lost	11	14	80	West Coast	14	11	95	Optus Stadium	A	54,535	12th
4	15 April	Won	15	13	103	St Kilda	7	14	56	GMHBA Stadium	H	27,338	8th
5	21 April	Won	12	12	84	Port Adelaide	7	8	50	Adelaide Oval	A	45,372	6th
6	28 April	Lost	10	9	69	Sydney	12	14	86	GMHBA Stadium	H	31,036	9th
7	4 May	Won	14	9	93	Greater Western Sydney	4	8	32	GMHBA Stadium	H	25,079	6th
8	13 May	Won	9	12	66	Collingwood	5	15	45	Melbourne Cricket Ground	A	44,602	3rd
9	19 May	Lost	7	8	50	Essendon	12	12	84	Melbourne Cricket Ground	A	50,228	8th
10	26 May	Won	11	7	73	Carlton	5	15	45	GMHBA Stadium	H	31,090	6th
11	2 June	Won	17	19	121	Gold Coast	4	12	36	Metricon Stadium	A	17,490	5th
12	9 June	Won	14	12	96	North Melbourne	8	11	59	GMHBA Stadium	H	31,265	4th
13	17 June	Lost	9	11	65	Richmond	12	11	83	Melbourne Cricket Ground	H	46,423	5th
14	Bye												7th
15	29 June	Lost	15	11	101	Western Bulldogs	16	7	103	Etihad Stadium	A	29,499	8th
16	5 July	Won	8	23	71	Sydney	9	5	59	Sydney Cricket Ground	A	34,363	7th
17	12 July	Lost	14	13	97	Adelaide	16	16	112	Adelaide Oval	A	46,095	8th
18	21 July	Won	16	4	100	Melbourne	14	14	98	GMHBA Stadium	H	30,125	9th
19	28 July	Won	18	12	120	Brisbane Lions	11	12	78	GMHBA Stadium	H	28,226	8th
20	3 August	Lost	12	10	82	Richmond	12	13	85	Melbourne Cricket Ground	A	67,054	9th
21	11 August	Lost	8	12	60	Hawthorn	10	11	71	Melbourne Cricket Ground	A	59,529	9th
22	18 August	Won	24	14	158	Fremantle	3	7	25	GMHBA Stadium	H	24,507	8th
23	25 August	Won	22	10	142	Gold Coast	5	10	40	GMHBA Stadium	H	28,004	8th
EF	7 September	Lost (Note: Geelong were eliminated from the finals series as a result of their elimination final loss to Melbourne.)	6	10	46	Melbourne	10	15	75	Melbourne Cricket Ground	A	91,767	—N/a

Key
H	Home game
A	Away game
GFX	2018 AFLX competition grand final match
EF	Elimination final

=== Ladder ===
Pos	Team	Pld	W	L	D	PF	PA	PP	Pts	Qualification
1	Richmond	22	18	4	0	2143	1574	136.1	72	2018 finals
2	West Coast (P)	22	16	6	0	2012	1657	121.4	64	2018 finals
3	Collingwood	22	15	7	0	2046	1699	120.4	60	2018 finals
4	Hawthorn	22	15	7	0	1972	1642	120.1	60	2018 finals
5	Melbourne	22	14	8	0	2299	1749	131.4	56	2018 finals
6	Sydney	22	14	8	0	1822	1664	109.5	56	2018 finals
7	Greater Western Sydney	22	13	8	1	1898	1661	114.3	54	2018 finals
8	Geelong	22	13	9	0	2045	1554	131.6	52	2018 finals
9	North Melbourne	22	12	10	0	1950	1790	108.9	48	
10	Port Adelaide	22	12	10	0	1780	1654	107.6	48	
11	Essendon	22	12	10	0	1932	1838	105.1	48	
12	Adelaide	22	12	10	0	1941	1865	104.1	48	
13	Western Bulldogs	22	8	14	0	1575	2037	77.3	32	
14	Fremantle	22	8	14	0	1556	2041	76.2	32	
15	Brisbane Lions	22	5	17	0	1825	2049	89.1	20	
16	St Kilda	22	4	17	1	1606	2125	75.6	18	
17	Gold Coast	22	4	18	0	1308	2182	59.9	16	
18	Carlton	22	2	20	0	1353	2282	59.3	8	

Source: AFL
Rules for classification: 1) points; 2) percentage; 3) number of points for.
(P) Premiers

== Awards ==
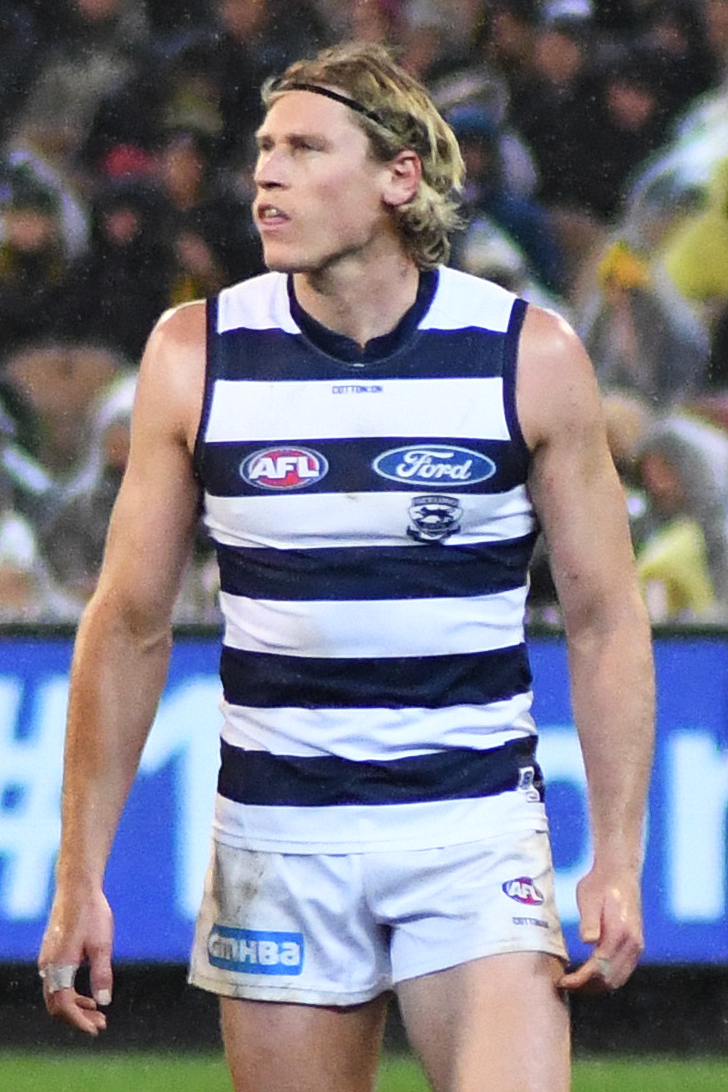
Mark Blicavs won the Carji Greeves Medal for 2018.

Geelong held their player awards night at Crown Palladium on 4 October. The club's best and fairest award, the Carji Greeves Medal, was won by Mark Blicavs, who received 234 votes; Patrick Dangerfield and Tim Kelly were joint runners-up with 233.5 votes apiece. It was Blicavs' second Carji Greeves Medal, having previously won the award in 2015. Additionally, George Horlin-Smith received the Tom Harley Award for best clubman, and Jamaine Jones was presented with the Community Champion award. Jack Henry was named the club's Best Young Player.

Dangerfield and Tom Stewart were selected in the honorary 2018 All-Australian team; Blicavs and Tom Hawkins were shortlisted but ultimately not selected in the final squad. Stewart also received the AFL Coaches Association's Best Young Player award, and Kelly was named Best First Year Player by the AFL Players Association. Henry was the Cats' sole nomination for the season's Rising Star award, nominated for his efforts in round 7.

Table of awards received by Geelong players
Award	Awarded by	Player	Result	Ref.
All-Australian team	Australian Football League	Mark Blicavs	Shortlisted	
All-Australian team	Australian Football League	Patrick Dangerfield	Selected	
All-Australian team	Australian Football League	Tom Hawkins	Shortlisted	
All-Australian team	Australian Football League	Tom Stewart	Selected	
AFL Rising Star	Australian Football League	Jack Henry (round 7)	Nominated	
Mark of the Year	Australian Football League	Jack Henry (round 23)	Nominated	
Leigh Matthews Trophy for Most Valuable Player	AFL Players Association	Mark Blicavs	Nominated	
Leigh Matthews Trophy for Most Valuable Player	AFL Players Association	Tom Hawkins	Nominated	
Leigh Matthews Trophy for Most Valuable Player	AFL Players Association	Tom Stewart	Nominated	
Best Captain	AFL Players Association	Joel Selwood	Nominated	
Robert Rose Award for Most Courageous Player	AFL Players Association	Joel Selwood	Nominated	
Best First Year Player	AFL Players Association	Tim Kelly	Won	
Best Young Player	AFL Coaches Association	Tom Stewart	Won	
Carji Greeves Medal	Geelong Football Club	Mark Blicavs	Won	
Best Young Player	Geelong Football Club	Jack Henry	Won	
Tom Harley Award	Geelong Football Club	George Horlin-Smith	Won	
Community Champion	Geelong Football Club	Jamaine Jones	Won	

== Reserves team ==
The club's reserves team, participating in the VFL, was coached by Shane O'Bree for a third season. Tom Atkins was the sole captain, having co-captained the prior season with Jake Edwards and Ben Moloney.

The reserves team finished the regular season with a 13–5 win–loss record and placed third on the league's ladder, qualifying for the finals series as a result. Geelong did not win either of their finals, losing to the Casey Demons in a qualifying final and then the Box Hill Hawks in the semi-finals. Atkins was awarded the club's VFL best and fairest award.

== VFL Women's team ==
Geelong Football Club
2018 (VFLW) season
- President: Colin Carter
- Coach: Paul Hood (2nd season)
- Captains: Rebecca Goring (2nd season)
- Home ground: GMHBA Stadium; Deakin University, Waurn Ponds
- VFLW: 4th
- Finals series: Runner Up
- VFLW Best & Fairest: Richelle Cranston
- Leading goalkicker: Kate Darby (18)

2018 was the club's second season of women's Australian rules football with the club fielding a team in the 2018 VFL Women's season, in preparation for the club's entry into the top-level AFL Women's competition from 2019. Paul Hood and Rebecca Goring continued as the coach and captain from the prior season. The women's team consisted of 39 players who were eligible for selection in matches in 2018.

Geelong finished in fourth at the end of the expanded 16-week home and away season to qualify for the finals. Winning consecutive finals, the Cats progressed to the 2018 VFL Women's Grand Final at Etihad Stadium, falling short to Hawthorn in the decider by 13 points.

=== Results ===
Key
H	Home game
A	Away game
F	Finals

Table of season results
Round	Date	Result	Score			Opponent	Score			Ground	
Round	Date	Result	G	B	T	Opponent	G	B	T	Ground	
1	6 May	Won	7	10	52	Melbourne University	2	1	13	GMHBA Stadium	H
2	13 May	Draw	4	3	27	Collingwood	3	9	7	Olympic Park Oval	A
3	20 May	Won	8	9	57	Williamstown	0	4	4	Williamstown Cricket Ground	A
4	26 May	Won	8	3	51	Carlton	7	2	44	GMHBA Stadium	H
5	3 June	Won	4	4	28	Melbourne University	4	3	27	University Oval, Parkville	A
6	16 June	Won	4	7	31	Darebin	2	4	16	GMHBA Stadium	H
7	Bye										
8	1 July	Lost	1	0	6	Western Bulldogs	4	4	28	Eureka Stadium	A
9	7 July	Lost	2	8	20	NT Thunder	13	7	85	Marrara Stadium	A
10	14 July	Won	8	7	55	Southern Saints	2	5	17	Deakin University, Waurn Ponds	H
11	21 July	Won	10	8	68	Casey Demons	4	3	27	Queens Park, Highton	H
12	Bye										
13	4 August	Won	10	7	67	Richmond	1	2	8	GMHBA Stadium	H
14	11 August	Won	8	11	59	Essendon	2	2	14	GMHBA Stadium	H
15	19 August	Won	8	5	53	Casey Demons	2	4	16	Casey Fields	A
16	25 August	Lost	3	7	25	Hawthorn	6	5	41	Box Hill City Oval	A
1SF	9 September	Won	7	9	51	NT Thunder	6	6	42	North Port Oval	N
PF	16 September	Won	5	12	42	Collingwood	4	4	28	North Port Oval	N
GF	23 September	Lost	2	5	17	Hawthorn	4	6	30	Etihad Stadium	N

=== Ladder ===
Pos	Team	Pld	W	L	D	PF	PA	PP	Pts	Qualification
1	Collingwood	14	12	1	1	607	328	185.1	50	Finals series
2	Hawthorn (P)	14	12	2	0	596	332	179.5	48	Finals series
3	NT Thunder	14	11	3	0	831	430	193.3	44	Finals series
4	Geelong Cats	14	10	3	1	599	367	163.2	42	Finals series
5	Darebin	14	8	6	0	527	481	109.6	32	
6	Western Bulldogs	14	7	7	0	494	589	83.9	28	
7	Carlton	14	6	8	0	562	536	104.9	24	
8	Southern Saints	14	5	9	0	439	475	92.4	20	
9	Melbourne University	14	5	9	0	455	585	77.8	20	
10	Casey Demons	14	5	9	0	414	594	69.7	20	
11	Williamstown	14	4	10	0	473	676	70.0	16	
12	Richmond	14	4	10	0	358	521	68.7	16	
13	Essendon	14	1	13	0	292	733	39.8	4	

Source: SportsTG
Rules for classification: 1) points; 2) percentage; 3) number of points for.
(P) Premiers

=== Awards ===
- Best & Fairest: Richelle Cranston
- VFL Women's Team of the Year: Rebecca Goring (Full back), Mia-Rae Clifford (Half forward), Richelle Cranston (Ruck rover)
