= 2018 VFL Women's season =

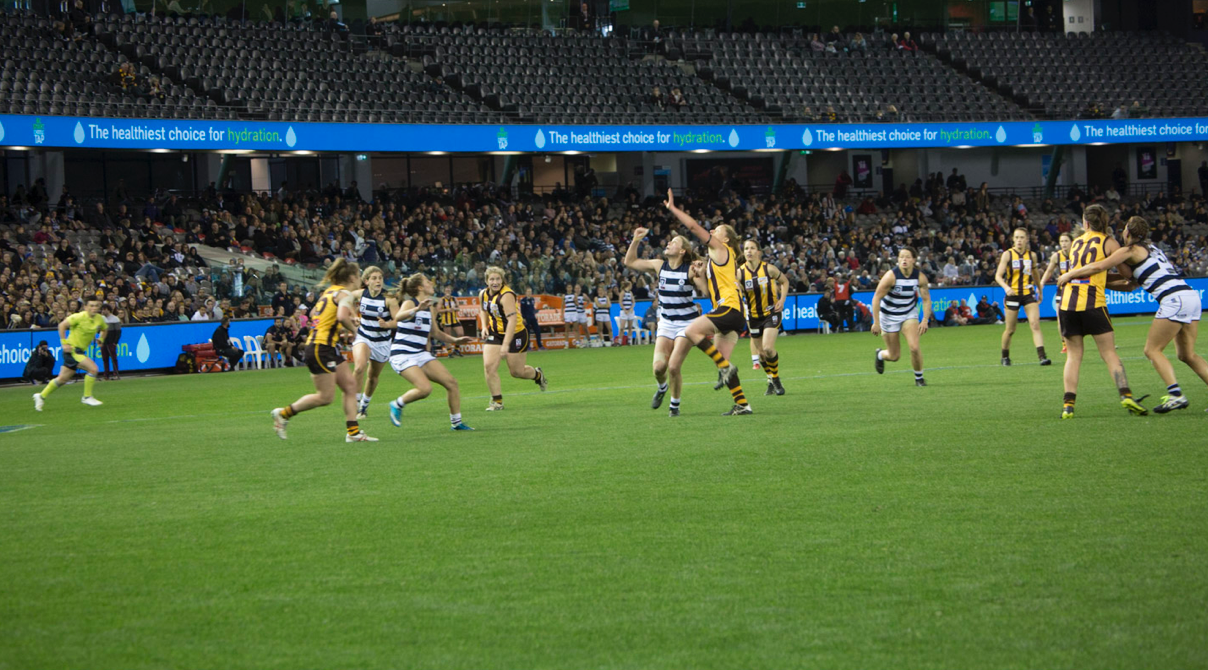
- Hawthorn and Geelong Cats in the Grand Final
- Teams: 13
- Premiers: Hawthorn; 1st premiership
- Minor premiers: Collingwood; 1st minor premiership
- Best and fairest: Jess Duffin; Williamstown (23 votes)
- Leading goalkicker: Darcy Vescio; Carlton (26 goals)

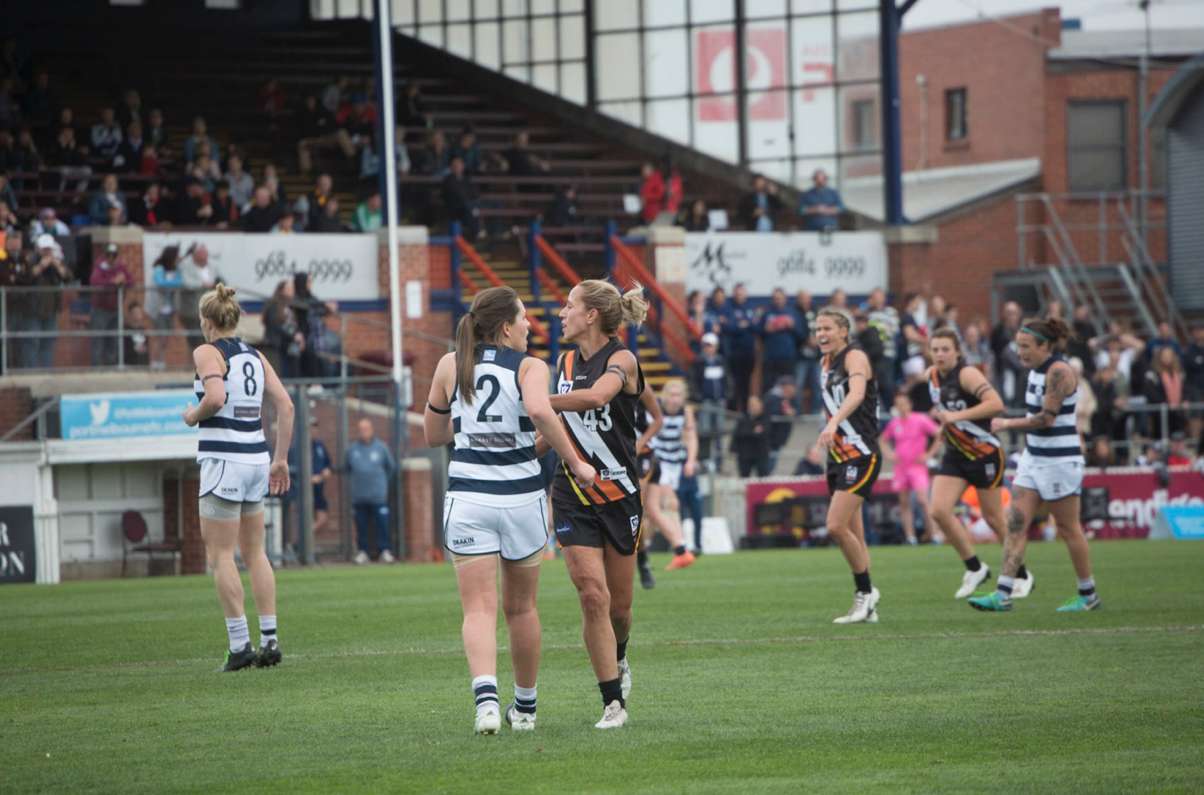
Northern Territory and Geelong Cats in the second semi-final at North Port Oval

The 2018 VFL Women's season was the third season of the VFL Women's (VFLW). The season commenced on 5 May and concluded with the Grand Final on 23 September 2018. The competition was contested by thirteen clubs.

== Clubs ==
Significant overhaul and changes were made to composition of the competition ahead of the 2018 season. With the establishment of the national AFL Women's competition in 2017, the league sought to affiliate clubs more closely to existing AFL/AFLW clubs. Consequently five foundation clubs departed; leaving Darebin, Melbourne University and VU Western Spurs (who were taken over by and renamed the Western Bulldogs to align with the AFL club) as the remaining clubs. The departing clubs were replaced by the AFL-aligned Carlton, Collingwood, Essendon, Richmond and Southern Saints, the VFL-aligned Casey and Williamstown, and the North East Australian Football League (NEAFL)-aligned Northern Territory; Northern Territory aligned with Adelaide's AFLW team, giving Crows players an opportunity to play in the Victorian competition. The thirteen clubs were as follows:

- Darebin, Williamstown, Casey, Collingwood, Hawthorn, Essendon, Geelong Cats, Richmond
- Western Bulldogs, Northern Territory, Carlton, Melbourne University, Southern Saints

== Ladder ==
Pos	Team	Pld	W	L	D	PF	PA	PP	Pts	Qualification
1	Collingwood	14	12	1	1	607	328	185.1	50	Finals series
2	Hawthorn (P)	14	12	2	0	596	332	179.5	48	Finals series
3	Northern Territory	14	11	3	0	831	430	193.3	44	Finals series
4	Geelong Cats	14	10	3	1	599	367	163.2	42	Finals series
5	Darebin	14	8	6	0	527	481	109.6	32	
6	Western Bulldogs	14	7	7	0	494	589	83.9	28	
7	Carlton	14	6	8	0	562	536	104.9	24	
8	Southern Saints	14	5	9	0	439	475	92.4	20	
9	Melbourne University	14	5	9	0	455	585	77.8	20	
10	Casey	14	5	9	0	414	594	69.7	20	
11	Williamstown	14	4	10	0	473	676	70.0	16	
12	Richmond	14	4	10	0	358	521	68.7	16	
13	Essendon	14	1	13	0	292	733	39.8	4	

Source: SportsTG
Rules for classification: 1) points; 2) percentage; 3) number of points for.
(P) Premiers

== Finals series ==
=== Semi-finals ===
	First Semi Final
Saturday 8 September (10:15 am)	Collingwood 3.3 (21)	def. by	Hawthorn 5.2 (32)	ETU Stadium

	Second Semi Final
Sunday 9 September (11:45 am)	NT Thunder 6.6 (42)	def. by	Geelong Cats 7.9 (51)	ETU Stadium

=== Preliminary final ===
	Preliminary Final
Sunday 16 September (11:45 am)	Collingwood 4.4 (28)	def. by	Geelong Cats 5.12 (42)	ETU Stadium

=== Grand Final ===
2018 VFLW Grand Final
Sunday 23 September (12:30 pm)	Hawthorn	def.	Geelong Cats	Marvel Stadium
1.3 (9); 2.6 (18); 3.6 (24); 4.6 (30)	Q1; Q2; Q3; Final	1.1 (7); 1.1 (7); 1.5 (11); 2.7 (19)	Lisa Hardeman Medal: Chantella Perera (Hawthorn); Television broadcast: AFL Victoria
S. Perkins, T. Luke, E. Mackie, E. Gilder 1	Goals	M. Boyd, K. Darby 1
C. Perera, P. McWilliams, M. Hutchins, R. Beeson, T. Luke, J. Van Dyk	Best	H. Burchell, N. Morrison, M. McMahon, M. Keryk, C. Blakeway, O. Purcell

== Awards ==
- Lambert-Pearce Medal (Best and Fairest): Jess Duffin (Williamstown) – 23 votes
- Rohenna Young Medal (Leading Goal kicker): Darcy Vescio (Carlton) – 26 goals
- Debbie Lee Medal (Rising Star): Jayde Van Dyk (Hawthorn)
- Coach of the Year: Penny Cula-Reid (Collingwood)
- Lisa Hardeman Medal (Best on ground VFL Women's Grand Final): Chantella Perera (Hawthorn)

2018 VFL Women's Team of the Year
B:	Jayde Van Dyk (Hawthorn)	Rebecca Goring (Geelong)	Kate Gillespie-Jones (Melbourne Uni)
HB:	Ashleigh Riddell (Melbourne Uni)	Meg McDonald (Darebin)	Bianca Jakobsson (Casey)
C:	Alison Drennan (Southern Saints)	Jess Duffin (Williamstown)	Rebecca Beeson (Hawthorn)
HF:	Sarah D'Arcy (Collingwood)	Jasmine Garner (Williamstown)	Jess Sedunary (NT Thunder)
F:	Hayley Bullas (Essendon)	Darcy Vescio (Carlton)	Mia-Rae Clifford (Geelong)
Foll:	Rhiannon Watt (Southern Saints)	Richelle Cranston (Geelong)	Ange Foley (NT Thunder)
Int:	Emma Swanson (NT Thunder)	Sophie Alexander (Collingwood)	Alice Edmonds (Richmond)
Int:	Libby Birch (Western Bulldogs)	Lauren Pearce (Darebin)	Emma Mackie (Hawthorn)
Coach:	Penny Cula-Reid (Collingwood)		
