= Michael Luxford =

Australian rules footballer

Personal information
- Full name: Michael Luxford
- Born: 23 February 1995 (age 31)
- Draft: No. 56, 2014 rookie draft
- Height: 187 cm (6 ft 2 in)
- Weight: 85 kg (187 lb)
- Position: Forward / Midfielder

Playing career^{1}
Years	Club	Games (Goals)
2015	Geelong	2 (0)
- ^{1} Playing statistics correct to the end of 2016.

Michael Luxford (born 23 February 1995) is a former professional Australian rules footballer who played for the Geelong Football Club in the Australian Football League (AFL).

Luxford was recruited by Geelong in November 2013 as a "category B" rookie, having played basketball as a junior, not football. After playing for Geelong in the Victorian Football League throughout 2014 he was elevated to Geelong's AFL senior squad in May 2015 and made his debut against Essendon. At the conclusion of the 2016 season, he was delisted by Geelong. He currently (2018) plays for the Geelong Supercats in the SEABL.

== Statistics ==
Legend
G	Goals	K	Kicks	D	Disposals	T	Tackles
B	Behinds	H	Handballs	M	Marks

Season	Team	No.	Games	Totals							Averages (per game)						
Season	Team	No.	Games	G	B	K	H	D	M	T	G	B	K	H	D	M	T
2014	Geelong	37	0	—	—	—	—	—	—	—	—	—	—	—	—	—	—
2015	Geelong	37	2	0	0	3	5	8	1	3	0.0	0.0	1.5	2.5	4.0	0.5	1.5
2016	Geelong	37	0	—	—	—	—	—	—	—	—	—	—	—	—	—	—
Career			2	0	0	3	5	8	1	3	0.0	0.0	1.5	2.5	4.0	0.5	1.5
