= AFL salary cap =

Salary cap implemented by the Australian Football League in 1987

The Australian Football League has implemented a salary cap on its clubs when Brisbane and West Coast were admitted, as part of its equalization policy.

The cap was set at some number A$1.25 million for 1987–1989 as per VFL agreement with the salary floor set at 90% of the cap or $1.125 million; the salary floor was increased to 92.5% of the cap in 2001, and to 95% of the cap for 2013 onwards due to increased revenues.

Both the salary cap and salary floor have increased substantially since the competition was re-branded as the AFL in 1990.

The AFL Players Association negotiates the CBA, including the Total Player Payments (TPP) figure which determines the salaries for AFL and AFLW players: the current AFL/AFLW CBA expires in 2027.

In June 2017, the AFL and AFL Players Association agreed to a new CBA deal which resulted in a 20% increase in players salary. The six-year deal, which began in 2017, had the average player wage rise from $309,000 to $371,000 and the player salary cap from $10.37m to $12.45m.

Following cuts to playing roster sizes and football department spending made due to the COVID-19 pandemic, these numbers differed to an extent, with the average AFL player wage in 2022 being $372,225.

The salary cap, known officially as Total Player Payments, was A$13,540,000 for the 2022 season, with a salary floor of $12,863,000.

A five-year CBA took effect in 2023 and expires in 2027. Under Schedule 2A of the 2023–2027 CBA, the aggregate Total Player Payment (TPP) figure was set in 2023 at $15,022,778, rising to $18,440,415 in 2027.

== Success of the cap ==
The VFL/AFL's salary cap has been quite successful in terms of parity: since the cap was introduced in 1987, each of the 17 teams have reached the Grand Final, and 14 teams have won the premiership.

Another major statistic in regards to the success of the VFL/AFL's cap is that the three richest and most successful clubs, Carlton, Collingwood and Essendon, who won 41 of the premierships between them from 75 Grand Finals in the 90 seasons between 1897 and 1986 (83.3% of all Grand Finals for a 45.6% premiership success rate), have only won seven of the premierships between them from thirteen Grand Finals in the 39 seasons since (33.3% of all Grand Finals for a 17.9% premiership success rate). Carlton have also not won the premiership since 1995, the third-longest premiership drought in the competition.

Of note in this regard is that Sydney, who mostly struggled in the 50 seasons between 1946 and 1995 (1946 to 1981 as South Melbourne), making the finals on just four occasions in that time (a finals success rate of 8%), had not won a premiership since 1933 and had not appeared in a Grand Final since 1945, have qualified for the finals in 26 of the 31 seasons since (a finals success rate of 85%), playing in seven Grand Finals, and winning the premiership in 2005 and 2012.

== Football department cap ==
Originally, the cap was only for the Total Player Payments of each club and not the club's football department. This has caused concern in recent years; for instance, three of the four top-spending clubs played in the Preliminary Finals in 2012 and 2013, and the last team to win the premiership outside the top eight spending teams was North Melbourne in 1999.

There had been calls for a separate cap for the football department, or to reform the salary cap to include football department spending, but these had been opposed by the wealthier clubs, with Sydney CEO Andrew Ireland saying that the AFL needed to examine the gap between football department spending for these teams.

In 2014, the AFL and its clubs accepted a luxury tax on football department spending (excluding the salary cap) to take effect in 2015 and an overall revenue tax to take effect by 2017. Clubs that exceed the football department cap will pay the AFL the lesser of $1 million or 37.5% of the excess, and repeat offenders will pay the lesser of 75% of the excess or $2 million.

== Criticism of the cap ==
The AFL salary cap is occasionally controversial, as it is a soft salary cap and therefore can sometimes be slightly different for each club. Clubs in poor financial circumstances (e.g. the Western Bulldogs, North Melbourne, Melbourne) have not always used their full cap, in some circumstances not even reaching the salary floor, to ensure they reduce costs.

The AFL has also used the cap to pursue its policy of supporting clubs in non-traditional markets such as Sydney and Brisbane.

== Breaches ==
The breaches of the salary cap and salary floor regulations as outlined by the AFL are:

- exceeding the TPP,
- falling below the salary floor,
- not informing the AFL of payments,
- late or incorrect lodgement or loss of documents relating to player financial and contract details, or
- engaging in draft tampering.

In addition, trading cash for players and playing coaches, formerly common practices, are prohibited in order to prevent wealthier clubs from circumventing the restrictions of the salary cap and salary floor.

Penalties for players, club officials or agents include fines of up to one-and-a half-times the amount involved and/or suspension. Penalties for clubs include fines of up to triple the amount involved ($10,000 for each document that is late or incorrectly lodged or lost), forfeiture of draft picks, and/or deduction of premiership points (since 2003).

As of 2025, no club has been penalised for breaches of the salary floor regulations, and no punishment has included the deduction of premiership points.

Breaches of the salary cap regulations are as follows:

- In 1992, Sydney were fined $50,000 after it was found that they had failed to disclose payments made to former player Greg Williams during the 1990 season; Williams was suspended for six matches and fined the maximum of $25,000 for accepting the payments.
- Three clubs were fined for minor breaches in 1993: Melbourne ($13,450), Carlton ($9,750) and Footscray ($2,700).
- In 1994, Carlton were fined $50,000 after it was found that they had exceeded the salary cap by $85,000 during the 1993 season.
- In 1995, Sydney were fined $20,000 after key documents relating to player financial details and star full-forward Tony Lockett's contract details were lost in the post by club officials, forcing the club, who had won the last three wooden spoons, to scratch from the 1995 pre-season draft and play the season two players short.
- In 1996, Essendon were fined a record $638,250 ($250,000 in back tax and penalties, $112,000 for draft tampering and $276,250 for breaching the salary cap regulations), forfeited their first, second and third round picks in the National Draft and were excluded from the 1997 rookie and pre-season drafts after a joint Australian Tax Office and AFL investigation found that they had committed serious and systematic breaches of the salary cap regulations totalling $514,500 between 1991 and 1996, including $110,000 in 1993 when Essendon won the premiership.
- In 1997, Port Adelaide was fined $50,000 for late lodgement of documents relating to the contract and financial details of five players who Port Adelaide paid not to nominate for the 1995 AFL Draft.
- Five other clubs also fined for exceeding the salary cap in 1998: Geelong ($77,000 and excluded from the 1999 pre-season draft), Collingwood ($47,500 and excluded from the 1999 pre-season draft), Hawthorn ($45,000), Richmond ($21,000 and excluded from the 1999 pre-season draft) and the Western Bulldogs ($5,300).
- Two other clubs were fined in 1999 for minor breaches: Carlton (fined $43,800 and excluded from the 2000 pre-season draft) and Geelong ($20,000).
- Four other clubs were fined in 2000 for minor breaches: North Melbourne ($35,000), Richmond ($10,000), Brisbane ($7,500), and Melbourne ($5,000).
- Three other clubs were fined in 2001 for minor breaches: Richmond and North Melbourne ($20,000 each) and Melbourne ($5,000).
- In 2002, Carlton were fined an AFL and Australian sporting record $987,500 and forfeited their priority picks in the 2002 National Draft, their first and second round picks in the 2003 and 2004 National Draft and were excluded from the 2003 pre-season draft after an AFL investigation found that they had committed serious and systematic breaches of the salary cap regulations totaling $1.37 million between 1998 and 2001; ruckman Matthew Allan was suspended for five matches and fined $10,000 for accepting undisclosed payments from club officials. Carlton struggled for seven years as it recovered both on and off the field from these significant penalties, finishing no higher than 11th in 2004 and winning their first-ever wooden spoons in 2002, 2005 and 2006.
- In 2003, Brisbane were fined $260,000 for late lodgement of documents relating to the contract and financial details of 26 players, Essendon were fined $85,000 but did not have any points deducted after it was found that they had exceeded the salary cap by $106,000 during the 2002 season, while the Western Bulldogs were fined $30,000 for late lodgement of documents relating to the contract and financial details of three players after a crackdown in light of the Carlton scandal the year before.
- In 2004, Melbourne were fined $30,000 for incorrect lodgement of documents relating to the contract and financial details of three players.
- In 2005, St Kilda were fined $40,000 for a minor breach in regards to minor sponsor Xbox providing players with the game machines.
- In 2006, St Kilda were fined $40,000 for late lodgement of documents relating to the contract and financial details of four players.
- Richmond was fined $10,000 in 2007 for late lodgement of a document relating to the contract and financial details of a player.
- Two clubs were fined in 2008 for minor breaches: Adelaide ($20,000) and St Kilda ($10,000).
- In 2011, Richmond were fined $10,000 but did not have any points deducted after it was found that they had exceeded the salary cap by $13,000 during the 2010 season.
- In 2012, Collingwood were fined $20,000 for late lodgement of documents relating to the contract and financial details of two players.
- In 2012, Adelaide were fined $300,000 and barred from the first two rounds and from taking any father-son selections in the 2013 National Draft but did not have any points deducted after an AFL investigation discovered that they had made unauthorised payments of $170,000 to and illegally agreed to trade forward Kurt Tippett to a club of his choice for a second-round draft pick when his contract expired at the end of 2012; Tippett was suspended until June 30, 2013 (11 matches plus the pre-season) and fined a player record $50,000 for accepting these conditions. Three Adelaide officials, CEO Steven Trigg (suspended until June 30, 2013 and fined $50,000), former football manager John Reid (no longer directly involved in the AFL, but suspended until June 30, 2013) and current football manager Phil Harper (suspended until June 30, 2013) were also punished for their involvement.
- In 2017, the Brisbane Lions were fined A$10,000 for "failing to correctly lodge their total player payment information." Half of the fine was suspended.
- In 2020, Geelong were fined A$40,000 after it voluntarily disclosed "inadvertent administrative errors" that had been repeated across the 2012–2019 seasons.
- In 2024, Western Bulldogs were issued with a suspended fine of A$20,000 for administrative errors identified in the club's 2022 AFL Women's total player payments submission in relation to third party agreements.
- In 2025, Geelong were fined A$77,500 (with A$40,000 suspended) for a "series of 'non-disclosures or late disclosures' of arrangements with club associates and third parties" for the period 2019–2024. "Non-disclosures found in Geelong's AFLW program were found to be administrative errors, rather than 'material breaches.'" An AFL audit found Geelong did not breach the AFL salary cap or player movement rules, but would be subjected to expanded compliance procedures for at least two seasons.

== State and regional leagues ==
Apart from the AFL, several regional leagues also have salary caps which although widening between them and the AFL.

	Salary Cap	Highest Player Salary
Australian Football League (AFL)	$12,758,095	
Victorian Football League (VFL)	$110,000 (AFL-aligned clubs) $220,000 (standalone clubs)	
South Australian National Football League (SANFL)	$400,000	
West Australian Football League (WAFL)	$200,000	
Tasmanian Football League (TSL)	$80,000	
Queensland Australian Football League (QAFL)	$70,000	

No information available for the NTFL, AFL Canberra, Sydney AFL.
