= Brad Hartman =

Australian rules footballer (born 1994)

Personal information
- Full name: Bradley Hartman
- Born: 16 November 1994 (age 31)
- Original team: Sturt (SANFL)
- Draft: No. 77, 2012 AFL draft
- Height: 188 cm (6 ft 2 in)
- Weight: 86 kg (190 lb)
- Position: Forward

Playing career^{1}
Years	Club	Games (Goals)
2014	Geelong	5 (1)
- ^{1} Playing statistics correct to the end of 2015.

Bradley Hartman (born 16 November 1994) is a former professional Australian rules footballer who played for the Geelong Football Club in the Australian Football League (AFL).

Originally from South Australian National Football League (SANFL) club Sturt, Hartmann was drafted by Geelong with the 77th selection in the 2012 AFL draft. Hartmann made his senior AFL debut in round 13, 2014, for Geelong against St Kilda at Kardinia Park but took leave from the club at the start of the 2015 pre-season for personal reasons. In May 2015 Hartman announcemd his retirement from AFL football, due to personal issues.

== Statistics ==
Legend
G	Goals	K	Kicks	D	Disposals	T	Tackles
B	Behinds	H	Handballs	M	Marks

Season	Team	No.	Games	Totals							Averages (per game)						
Season	Team	No.	Games	G	B	K	H	D	M	T	G	B	K	H	D	M	T
2013	Geelong	36	0	—	—	—	—	—	—	—	—	—	—	—	—	—	—
2014	Geelong	36	5	1	0	21	17	38	2	13	0.2	0.0	4.2	3.4	7.6	0.4	2.6
2015	Geelong	36	0	—	—	—	—	—	—	—	—	—	—	—	—	—	—
Career			5	1	0	21	17	38	2	13	0.2	0.0	4.2	3.4	7.6	0.4	2.6
