= Jamaine Jones =

Australian rules footballer

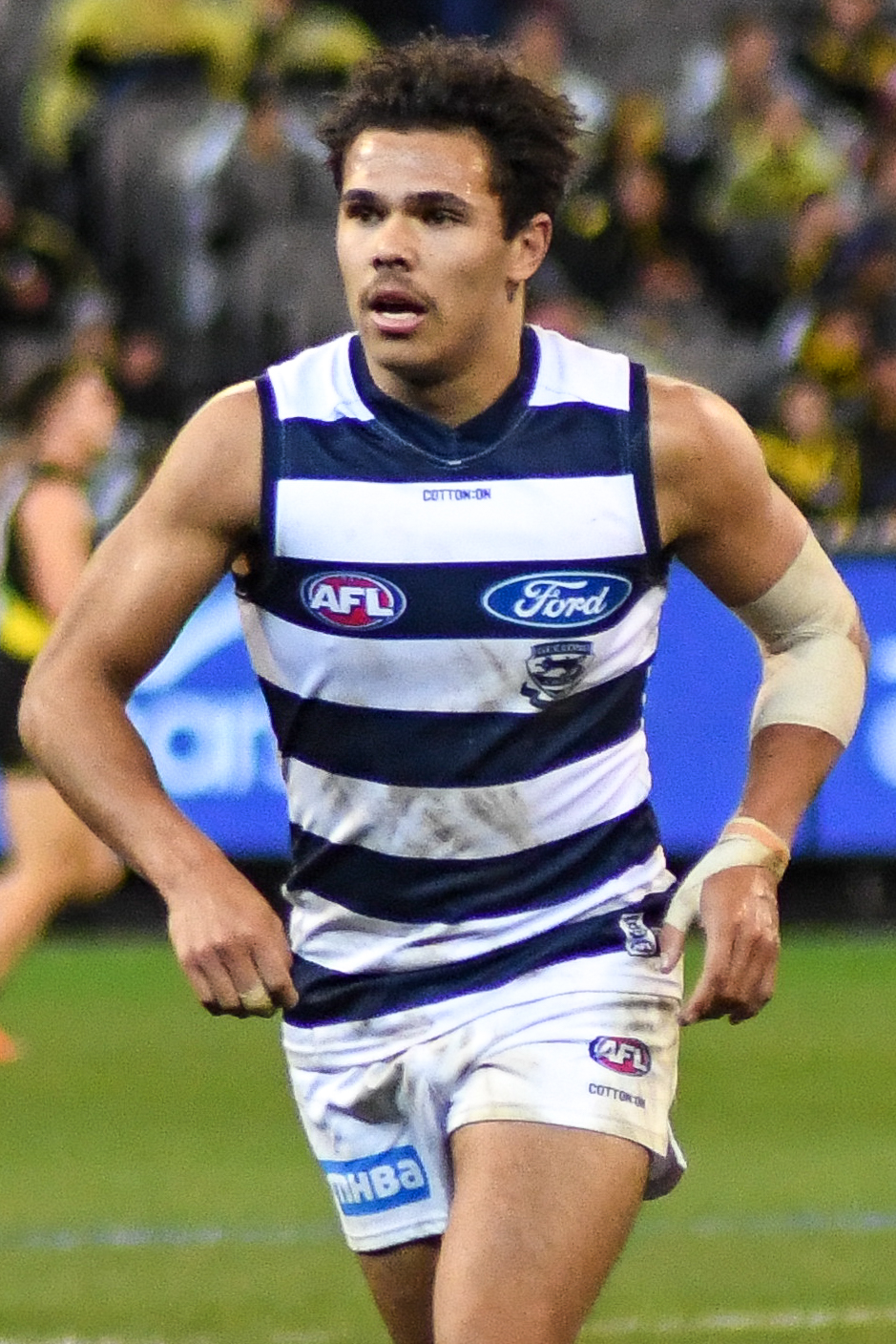
- Jones playing for Geelong in August 2018

Personal information
- Born: 29 September 1998 (age 28); Broken Hill, New South Wales, Australia
- Original teams: North Ballarat Rebels, Heywood Football Club
- Draft: No. 48, 2016 rookie draft
- Debut: Round 10, 2018, Geelong vs. Carlton, at GMHBA Stadium
- Height: 180 cm (5 ft 11 in)
- Weight: 81 kg (179 lb)
- Position: Small forward

Playing career
Years	Club	Games (Goals)
2017–2019	Geelong	7 (4)
2020–2024	West Coast	59 (19)
Total		66 (23)

Jamaine Jones is a former professional Australian rules footballer who played for Geelong and West Coast in the Australian Football League (AFL). Jones debuted in round 10, 2018 against Carlton at Kardinia Park, and scored a goal with his first kick.

Jones was born in Broken Hill and was raised in a group home in Mildura. He is a Barkindji man. Aged 10, he was adopted by Sue Lovett and moved to Geelong where he played football for Belmont. Jones later moved to Heywood and won a 2015 premiership with its local club aged 16. He studied at Heywood District Secondary College, and later played for the North Ballarat Rebels. Jones said that he "didn't take footy too seriously" and was told by Talent Manager Phil Partington that he "wasn't going to make it" after struggling in his first year in the TAC Cup, but said the remark made him stronger for his second year.

Jones was noticed by Geelong recruiter Stephen Wells after a best-on-ground performance in an inter-league match with Hampden League. He was drafted by Geelong with their last pick (number 48) in the 2017 AFL rookie draft – a pick described by coach Chris Scott as "as speculative as they come". Jones played in the 2018 JLT Community Series and was selected in Geelong's senior side after strong form in the Victorian Football League (VFL).

Jones was delisted shortly after Geelong's preliminary final loss to Richmond in 2019, and in March 2020 was signed to the West Coast during the supplementary selection period (SSP).

Jones spent 5 seasons at West Coast, playing 59 games, before being delisted at the conclusion of the 2024 AFL season.

== Statistics ==
Legend
G	Goals	K	Kicks	D	Disposals	T	Tackles
B	Behinds	H	Handballs	M	Marks

Season	Team	No.	Games	Totals							Averages (per game)							Votes
Season	Team	No.	Games	G	B	K	H	D	M	T	G	B	K	H	D	M	T	Votes
2018	Geelong	41	7	4	2	30	30	60	14	26	0.6	0.3	4.3	4.3	8.6	2.0	3.7	0
2020 (Note: The 2020 season was played with 17 home-and-away matches per team (down from 22) and 16-minute quarters with time on (down from 20-minute quarters with time on) due to the impact of the COVID-19 pandemic.)	West Coast	47	2	0	1	13	8	21	5	8	0.0	0.5	6.5	4.0	10.5	2.5	4.0	0
2021	West Coast	31	15	11	3	64	37	101	21	47	0.7	0.2	4.3	2.5	6.7	1.4	3.1	0
2022	West Coast	31	18	3	2	177	102	279	59	69	0.2	0.1	9.8	5.7	15.5	3.3	3.8	0
2023	West Coast	31	13	4	2	142	84	226	47	27	0.3	0.2	10.9	6.5	17.4	3.6	2.1	3
2024	West Coast	31	11	1	2	83	41	124	42	27	0.1	0.2	7.5	3.7	11.3	3.8	2.5	0
2025	West Coast	31	0	—	—	—	—	—	—	—	—	—	—	—	—	—	—	0
Career			66	23	12	509	302	811	188	204	0.3	0.2	7.7	4.6	12.3	2.8	3.1	3
