= 2015 AFL Mark of the Year =

- Date: 31 May
- Location: Domain Stadium
- Winner: Nic Naitanui (West Coast)

The Australian Football League celebrates the best mark of the season through the annual Mark of the Year competition. In 2015, this is officially known as the Weet-Bix AFL Mark of the Year. Each round three marks are nominated and fans are able to vote online for their favourite.

== Winners by round ==
Legend

= Round's winning mark

Round	Nominees	Team	% of votes	Opposition	Ground
1	Rohan Bewick	Brisbane Lions	9%	Collingwood	The Gabba
1	Josh Bruce	St Kilda	63%	Greater Western Sydney	Etihad Stadium
1	Paul Puopolo	Hawthorn	28%	Geelong	MCG
2
2	Matthew Broadbent	Port Adelaide	59%	Sydney	Adelaide Oval
2	Jesse Hogan	Melbourne	18%	Greater Western Sydney	StarTrack Oval
2	George Horlin-Smith	Geelong	23%	Fremantle	Simonds Stadium
3	Jamie Elliott	Collingwood	33%	St Kilda	MCG
3	Jeremy Howe	Melbourne	46%	Adelaide	Adelaide Oval
3	David Mackay	Adelaide	22%	Melbourne	Adelaide Oval
4	Mitch Clark	Geelong	20%	North Melbourne	Simmonds Stadium
4	Nat Fyfe	Fremantle	63%	Sydney	Domain Stadium
4	Ben Griffiths	Richmond	16%	Melbourne	MCG
5	Jeff Garlett	Melbourne	41%	Fremantle	MCG
5	Brodie Grundy	Collingwood	38%	Carlton	MCG
5	Jack Riewoldt	Richmond	21%	Geelong	MCG
6	Nick Haynes	Greater Western Sydney	22%	Hawthorn	Spotless Stadium
6	Dale Thomas	Carlton	26%	Brisbane Lions	Etihad Stadium
6	Taylor Walker	Adelaide	52%	Gold Coast	Metricon Stadium
7	Eddie Betts	Adelaide	48%	St Kilda	Adelaide Oval
7	Joe Daniher	Essendon	36%	North Melbourne	Etihad Stadium
7	Lindsay Thomas	North Melbourne	17%	Essendon	Etihad Stadium
8	Jeremy Howe	Melbourne	32%	Western Bulldogs	MCG
8	Brian Lake	Hawthorn	46%	Sydney	MCG
8	Kade Simpson	Carlton	21%	Geelong	Etihad Stadium
9	Nic Naitanui	West Coast	86%	Geelong	Domain Stadium
9	Fletcher Roberts	Western Bulldogs	7%	Greater Western Sydney	Etihad Stadium
9	Easton Wood	Western Bulldogs	7%	Greater Western Sydney	Etihad Stadium
10	Brad Ebert	Port Adelaide	17%	Western Bulldogs	Adelaide Oval
10	Nat Fyfe	Fremantle	74%	Richmond	Domain Stadium
10	Easton Wood	Western Bulldogs	9%	Port Adelaide	Adelaide Oval
11	Sean Dempster	St Kilda	41%	Melbourne	Etihad Stadium
11	Jarrad Waite	North Melbourne	7%	Sydney	Etihad Stadium
11	Chad Wingard	Port Adelaide	52%	Geelong	Adelaide Oval
12	Kyle Cheney	Adelaide	28%	Hawthorn	Adelaide Oval
12	Brett Deledio	Richmond	8%	West Coast	MCG
12	Elliot Yeo	West Coast	64%	Richmond	MCG
13	Rohan Bewick	Brisbane Lions	25%	Adelaide	The Gabba
13	Jack Riewoldt	Richmond	27%	Sydney	SCG
13	Nathan Van Berlo	Adelaide	49%	Brisbane Lions	The Gabba
14	Shaun Burgoyne	Hawthorn	21%	Collingwood	MCG
14	Jack Riewoldt	Richmond	19%	Greater Western Sydney	MCG
14	Lindsay Thomas	North Melbourne	60%	Gold Coast	Metricon Stadium
15	Dylan Buckley	Carlton	63%	Richmond	MCG
15	Shaun Edwards	Essendon	29%	Melbourne	MCG
15	Luke Parker	Sydney	8%	Brisbane Lions	The Gabba
16	Ben Brown	North Melbourne	18%	Essendon	Etihad Stadium
16	Jack Riewoldt	Richmond	14%	St Kilda	Etihad Stadium
16	Michael Walters	Fremantle	68%	Carlton	Domain Stadium
17	Levi Casboult	Carlton	40%	Hawthorn	Etihad Stadium
17	Sean Dempster	St Kilda	39%	Melbourne	MCG
17	Isaac Heeney	Sydney	21%	West Coast	Domain Stadium
18	Blaine Boekhorst	Carlton	22%	North Melbourne	Etihad Stadium
18	Luke Dahlhaus	Western Bulldogs	23%	Essendon	Etihad Stadium
18	Dom Sheed	West Coast	55%	Gold Coast	Metricon Stadium
19	Nakia Cockatoo	Geelong	25%	Sydney	Simonds Stadium
19	Tendai Mzungu	Fremantle	38%	St Kilda	Etihad Stadium
19	Taylor Walker	Adelaide	37%	Richmond	Adelaide Oval
20	Brendon Ah Chee	Port Adelaide	39%	Greater Western Sydney	Adelaide Oval
20	Matthew Boyd	Western Bulldogs	18%	Melbourne	Etihad Stadium
20	Elliot Yeo	West Coast	43%	Fremantle	Domain Stadium
21	Shaun McKernan	Essendon	16%	Gold Coast	Metricon Stadium
21	Jake Stringer	Western Bulldogs	24%	West Coast	Domain Stadium
21	Michael Walters	Fremantle	60%	North Melbourne	Etihad Stadium
22	Taylor Garner	North Melbourne	13%	Western Bulldogs	Etihad Stadium
22	Daniel Menzel	Geelong	49%	Collingwood	MCG
22	Andrew Walker	Carlton	38%	Greater Western Sydney	Spotless Stadium
23	John Butcher	Port Adelaide	44%	Fremantle	Adelaide Oval
23	Jeremy Howe	Melbourne	33%	Greater Western Sydney	Etihad Stadium
23	Nic Naitanui	West Coast	22%	St Kilda	Domain Stadium

== 2015 finalists ==
Round	Nomineess	Team	Opposition	Ground	Description
1	Josh Bruce	St Kilda	Greater Western Sydney	Etihad Stadium	Saint soars over three Giants for a huge grab, leaving his skipper delighted
3	Jeremy Howe	Melbourne	Adelaide	Adelaide Oval	Frequent-flying Demon produces one of his very best in the backline
9	Nic Naitanui	West Coast	Geelong	Domain Stadium	West Coast's human highlight reel soars above two ruckmen for an all-time classic

== See also ==
- Mark of the Year
- Goal of the Year
- 2015 AFL Goal of the Year
- 2015 AFL season
