= Darcy Lang =

Australian rules footballer (born 1995)

Personal information
- Full name: Darcy Lang
- Born: 21 November 1995 (age 30); Colac
- Original teams: Colac (GFL); Geelong Falcons (TAC Cup)
- Draft: 16th overall 2013 AFL draft
- Height: 183 cm (6 ft 0 in)
- Weight: 77 kg (170 lb)
- Position: Midfielder

Club information
- Current club: Carlton
- Number: 16

Playing career^{1}
Years	Club	Games (Goals)
2014–2017	Geelong	44 (31)
2018–2020	Carlton	20 (12)
Total		64 (43)
- ^{1} Playing statistics correct to the end of end of 2020 season.

Career highlights
- 2015 AFL Rising Star nominee

Darcy Lang (born 21 November 1995) is an Australian rules footballer. He played for seven years in the Australian Football League, with Geelong and Carlton.

Darcy grew up in Colac, Victoria and played for Victoria Country in the 2013 AFL Under 18 Championships, where he suffered a broken leg.

Lang was drafted by Geelong with the 16th overall selection in the 2013 national draft. He made his debut for Geelong in the round 13 win against St Kilda in 2014. In August 2015, he was the round nominee for the AFL Rising Star after the round 21 draw to St Kilda, where he recorded sixteen disposals, three marks and two tackles. He played a total of 44 matches for Geelong over four seasons.

On the second last day of the 2017 trade period, Lang confirmed his desire to move to Carlton. He was officially traded to Carlton the next day. He made his Carlton debut in Round 8, 2018 against Essendon, and kicked a goal with his first kick in a Carlton jumper, less than a minute into the game. He was a fringe player across his first two seasons with the club, playing 19 games, but played only one game in his final season, 2020, and battled ankle injuries during his time at the club. he was delisted at the end of the 2020 season.

After being delisted, Lang played for Waratah in the 2020/21 Northern Territory Football League summer season.

He returned to Geelong after signing as a VFL-listed player with its reserves team in 2021.

From 2022 until the end of the 2023 season, Lang was co-coach of the Colac Football Club playing in the Geelong Football Netball League (GNFL). He would step down from the coaching role due to work commitments, but continued to play for the club in 2024. Lang won the Colac club's best and fairest award in 2022, winning the Ted Parker Medal to join his father Phil as winners of the award. He would have won the Mathieson Medal as the GFNL's best and fairest player in 2022 polling 26 votes, but was ruled ineligible due to suspension.

In 2024, he would kick 33 goals for Colac to finish fifth in the GNFL best and fairest count.

== Statistics ==
Statistics are correct to the end of 2020 season.

Legend
G	Goals	K	Kicks	D	Disposals	T	Tackles
B	Behinds	H	Handballs	M	Marks

Season	Team	No.	Games	Totals							Averages (per game)						
Season	Team	No.	Games	G	B	K	H	D	M	T	G	B	K	H	D	M	T
2014	Geelong	11	1	1	1	5	2	7	2	6	1.0	1.0	5.0	2.0	7.0	2.0	6.0
2015	Geelong	11	20	14	5	151	120	271	63	55	0.7	0.3	7.6	6.0	13.6	3.2	2.8
2016	Geelong	11	13	10	6	102	82	184	46	36	0.8	0.5	7.9	6.3	14.2	3.5	2.8
2017	Geelong	11	10	6	9	75	84	159	31	54	0.6	0.9	7.5	8.4	15.9	3.1	5.4
2018	Carlton	16	11	6	2	94	58	152	44	40	0.5	1.2	8.6	5.3	13.8	4.0	3.6
2019	Carlton	16	8	5	5	44	19	63	24	24	0.6	0.6	5.5	2.4	7.9	3.0	3.0
2020	Carlton	16	1	1	1	2	2	4	0	2	1.0	1.0	2.0	2.0	4.0	0.0	2.0
Career			64	43	29	473	367	840	210	217	0.7	0.5	7.4	5.7	13.1	3.3	3.4
