= Jordan Cunico =

Australian rules footballer

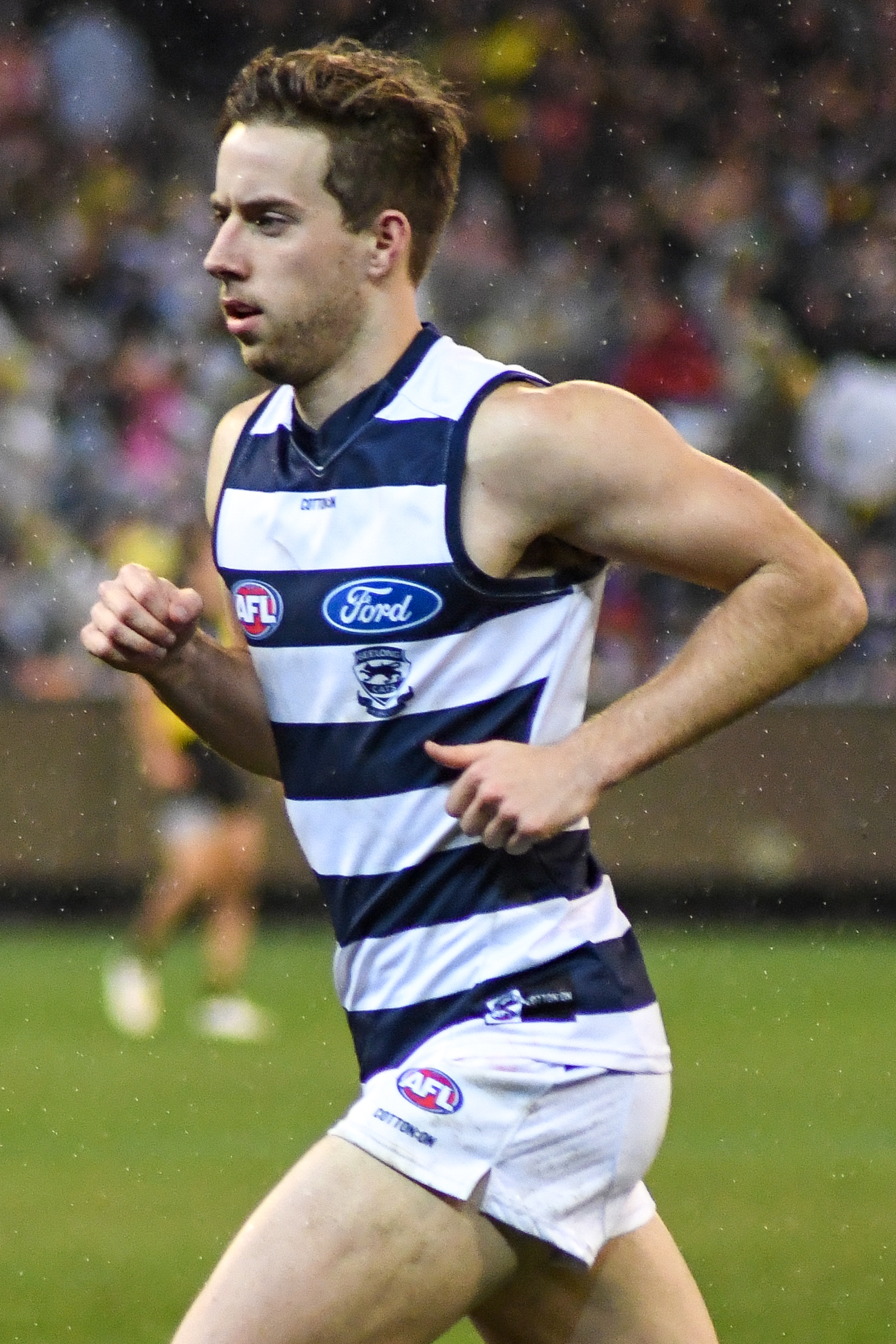
- Cunico playing for Geelong in August 2018

Personal information
- Full name: Jordan Cunico
- Born: 7 May 1996 (age 30)
- Original team: Gippsland Power (TAC Cup)
- Draft: No. 59, 2014 national draft
- Debut: Round 10, 2017, Geelong vs. Port Adelaide, at Simonds Stadium
- Height: 184 cm (6 ft 0 in)
- Weight: 80 kg (176 lb)
- Position: Defender

Club information
- Current club: Geelong
- Number: 31

Playing career^{1}
Years	Club	Games (Goals)
2017–2018	Geelong	15 (4)
- ^{1} Playing statistics correct to the end of 2018.

Jordan Cunico (born 7 May 1996) is a professional Australian rules footballer who played for the Geelong Football Club in the Australian Football League (AFL). He was drafted by Geelong with their fourth selection and fifty-ninth overall in the 2014 national draft. He made his debut in the two point win against Port Adelaide at Simonds Stadium in round ten of the 2017 season.
