= Tom Ruggles =

Australian rules footballer

Personal information
- Full name: Tom Ruggles
- Born: 25 April 1992 (age 34)
- Original team: Geelong (VFL)
- Draft: No. 44, 2016 rookie draft
- Debut: Round 3, 2016, Geelong vs. Brisbane Lions, at Simonds Stadium
- Height: 186 cm (6 ft 1 in)
- Weight: 83 kg (183 lb)
- Position: Defender

Playing career^{1}
Years	Club	Games (Goals)
2016–2017	Geelong	22 (0)
- ^{1} Playing statistics correct to the end of 2017.

Tom Ruggles (born 25 April 1992) is a former professional Australian rules footballer who played for the Geelong Football Club in the Australian Football League (AFL). He was drafted by the Geelong Football Club with their third selection and forty-fourth overall in the 2016 rookie draft. He made his debut in the sixty-nine point win against the Brisbane Lions in round 3, 2016 at Simonds Stadium. He was delisted by Geelong at the conclusion of the 2017 season.
