= Paul Vasileff =

Australian fashion designer

Paul Sebastian Vasileff
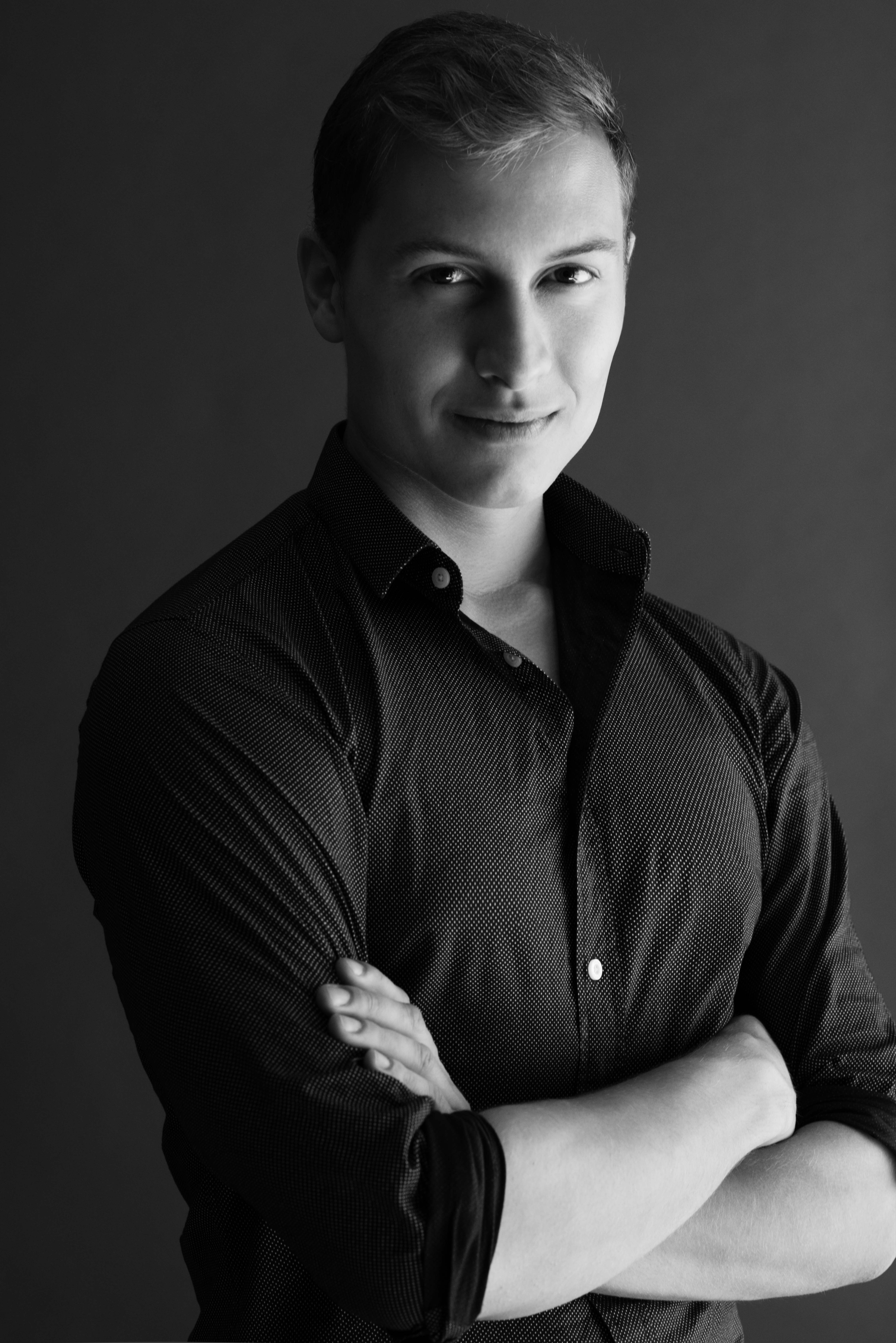
- Vasileff in 2014
- Born: 5 May 1990 (age 36); Adelaide, South Australia, Australia
- Website: www.paolosebastian.com

Paul Sebastian Vasileff (born 5 May 1990) is an Australian fashion designer who is the founder and head designer for Paolo Sebastian, an internationally known atelier based in South Australia.

== Early life ==
Vasileff was born in Adelaide, Australia and attended Christian Brothers College. Both of his parents were scientists and first generation immigrants to Australia, with Italian heritage on his mother's side and Bulgarian on his father's. Vasileff showed an aptitude for the arts as a child, and attended private art lessons from the age of three. Much of his introduction to sewing was under the guidance of his grandmother. He later went on to take private pattern-making lessons. At age eleven, Vasileff made his first design for a childhood friend. He went on to hone his skills by making school formal dresses for friends.

== Career ==
The designer launched the label, Paolo Sebastian, in 2007 with his first runway show. The launch was part of his senior year of high school, and featured sixty three designs. He often states that the success of this launch is shared with the family and friends who supported the event. Vasileff's designs are often inspired by fable or fairy tale.

After finishing school and a year of study at TafeSA, Vasileff went on to work for Di Fabio Brothers Tailoring in Adelaide where he learnt the tricks of the trade. His former high school teacher encouraged him to apply for a scholarship to Milan's Istituto Europe di Design in 2010 which he won despite limited Italian skills. Whilst at the institute, one of Vasileff's designs was featured at London Fashion Week.

Being close to his family, Vasileff felt strongly about staying in South Australia to build his career despite many in the fashion industry telling him that he would need to move overseas. Upon his return to Australia from Italy, Vasileff worked from a studio at the back of the tailors shop he had previously worked in, designing custom pieces for clients. Vasileff's first couture collection based on the ballet Swan Lake, and garnered great success as he was invited to showcase at the Sydney Fashion Palette. Someone took photos of the garments and put them on Pinterest and Instagram which then led to emails flooding in from around the world wanting his designs.

As the business expanded and clients began to approach him from interstate and overseas, Vasileff moved into his first atelier in suburban Adelaide, slowly expanding his team. January 2015 saw Vasileff move his business into the Adelaide CBD, opening the Paolo Sebastian atelier. The designer launches two couture collections each year, priding himself on close attention to detail and the creation of a grand story through couture.

Vasileff's designs have been worn to The Academy Awards, the Daytime Emmy Awards and the Grammy Awards.

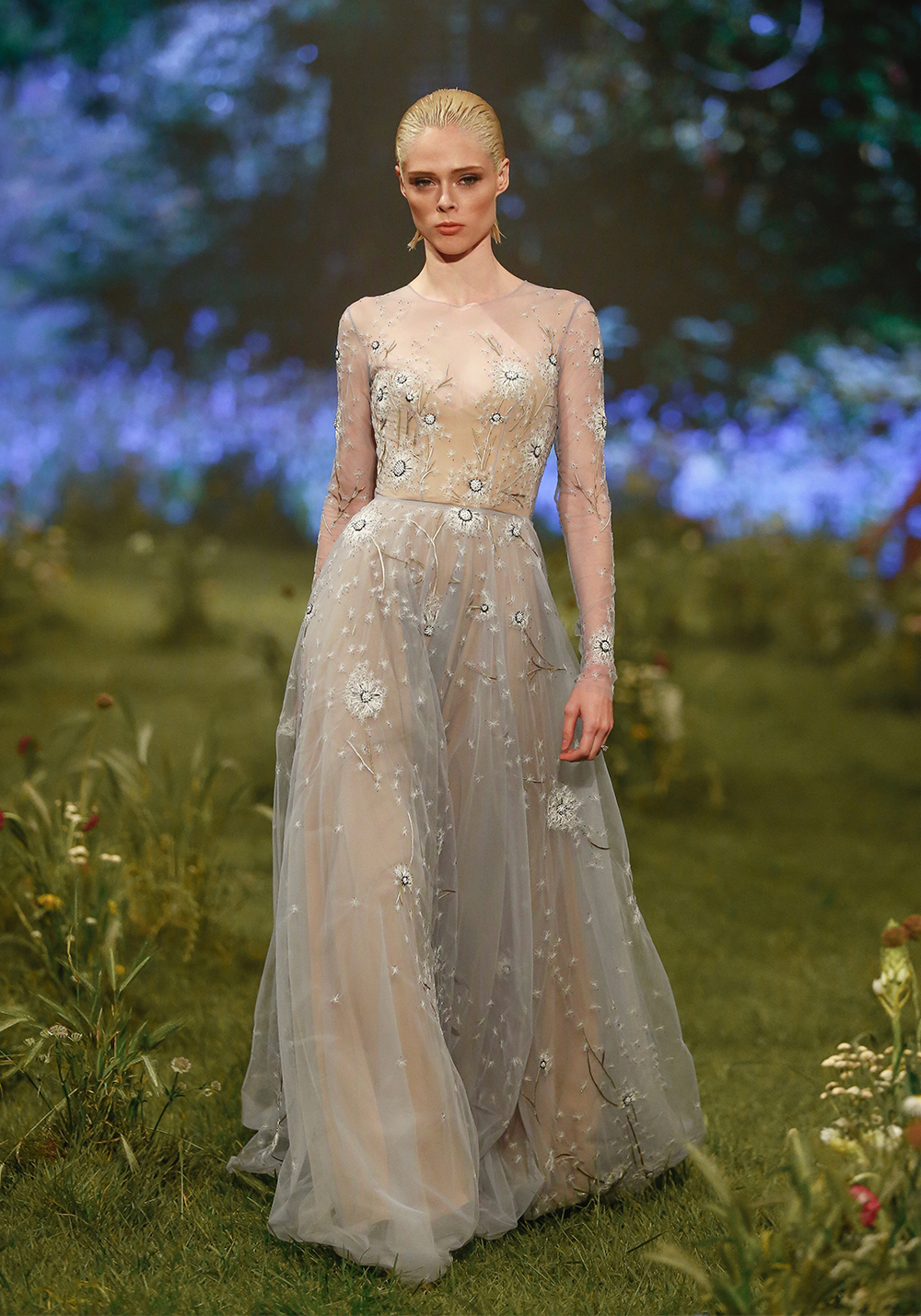
Coco Rocha wearing Paolo Sebastian on the runway at the 'Wildflowers' collection launch, Adelaide Fashion Festival 2016

In October 2015 and 2016 Vasileff closed the Adelaide Fashion Festival with two sold out Paolo Sebastian runway shows.

On 9 November 2016, Vasileff received the 2017 SA Young Australian of the Year Award. In 2017, he won the Young Australian of the Year award for his work in founding and running Paolo Sebastian.

Vasileff was awarded Best Australian Evening Wear Designer in the 2017 Prix de Marie Claire Awards.

October 2017 saw the Vasileff collaborate with Disney on an exclusive thirty-four piece couture collection entitled Once Upon A Dream.

From October to December 2017, Vasileff had his garments on display in an exhibition at the Art Gallery of South Australia.

In 2020, Paolo Sebastian debuted at Virgin Australia Melbourne Fashion Festival (VAMFF), but due to the COVID-19 pandemic Vasileff was not able to be there in person to witness the collection hitting the runway.

== Media ==
Vasileff has appeared as a fashion commentator on The Morning Show (Seven Network), and for Who Magazine. Paolo Sebastian designs have also appeared on the following television programs: The Bold and the Beautiful, Days of Our Lives, Home and Away.

== Personal life ==
At age nine, Vasileff wrote a list of things he would like to achieve in life. On that list was to work for Disney (which he did in 2015), create a dress for Jennifer Lopez and become a fashion designer.

Vasileff is an ambassador for Mercedes-Benz Adelaide and Burkuma.

=== Notable clients ===
- Kim Kardashian
- Giuliana Rancic
- Kris Jenner
- Sonam Kapoor
- Corinne Foxx
- Megan Gale
- Delta Goodrem
- Carrie Bickmore
- Rachael Finch
- Dannii Minogue
- Ada Nicodemou
- Rebecca Judd
- Nadia Bartel
- Kerry Washington
- Julia Michaels
- Mary J. Blige
- Hailee Steinfeld
