= Paolo Sebastian =

Australian fashion brand

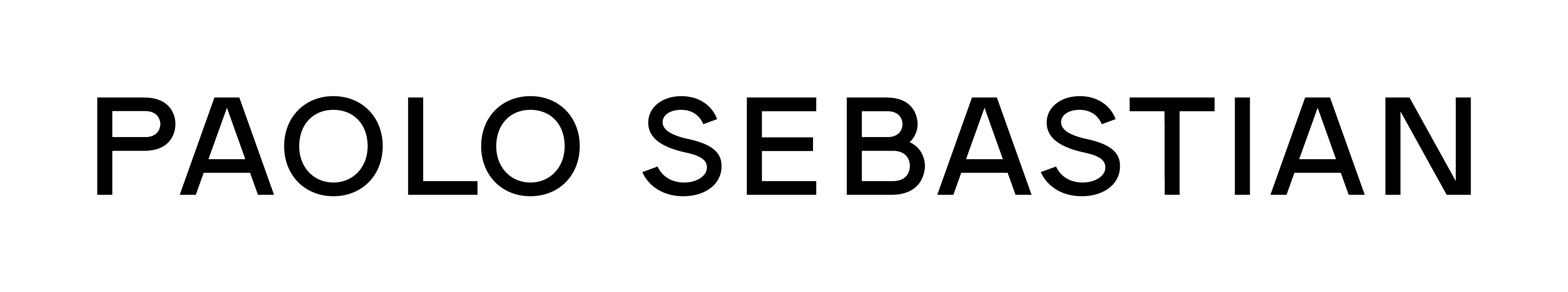
- Type: Couture Brand
- Industry: Fashion
- Founded: 2007
- Founder: Paul Vasileff
- Headquarters: Adelaide, South Australia, Australia
- Website: http://www.paolosebastian.com

Paolo Sebastian is an Australian fashion house, founded by designer Paul Vasileff. The atelier is located in South Australia, and the label is known for creating designs featuring intricate details and honouring the traditional methods of craftsmanship.

== History ==
Paul Vasileff launched Paolo Sebastian in 2007 at the age of seventeen, after studying at Adelaide technical college and at Milan's Istituto Europeo di Design. In the years since, he and his team have transformed the local label into an international couture house. Initially beginning with custom orders from acquaintances, Paolo Sebastian now works with clients, stylists and stockists across the globe.

In 2016 designer Vasileff and his team took the 2016/17 AW Gilded Wings collection to Paris, for private showings. The collection received acclaim from visiting media and the public alike. Following the Paris showings, online luxury fashion retailer Moda Operandi hosted a trunk show of the label's 2016/17 AW couture collection.

In October 2015 the label closed the 2015 Adelaide Fashion Festival with two sold out Paolo Sebastian runway shows. Paolo Sebastian's most recent collection was launched at the 2016 Adelaide Fashion Festival, again with two sold-out shows. October 2016 saw the label once again close the Adelaide Fashion Festival, this time with international model Coco Rocha walking the runway.

In July 2017, Vasileff and his team returned to Paris to launch their Autumn Winter 16/17 Couture Collection, Reverie, during Paris Haute Couture Fashion Week.

October 2017 saw the label collaborate with Disney on an exclusive thirty-four piece couture collection entitled Once Upon A Dream. The first of its kind collaboration granted the label exclusive rights to use original Disney lyrics throughout the collection.

From October to December 2017, Vasileff had his garments on display in an exhibition at the Art Gallery of South Australia.

In July 2018 Vasileff and his team return to Paris for the third year to launch their Autumn Winter 18/19 Couture Collection, The Nutcracker.

In 2020, Paolo Sebastian debuted at Virgin Australia Melbourne Fashion Festival (VAMFF) with "The Passage of Spring" Collection.

In 2021, the brands' first ever bespoke collection launched at Melbourne Fashion Festival, inspired by Greek mythology and the goddess Persephone. "The collection follows a narrative, which starts out as pure and light in the beginning, becomes darker and returns back to the light again with flowers blossoming. However, Persephone is stronger and less naïve and vulnerable at the end of the story," said Vasileff.

In 2022, Paolo Sebastian launched "The Wild Swans" collection at the Melbourne Fashion Festival, combining fairytales, fashion, and women's empowerment. This marked his third collaboration with the event.

Early, 2023, Paolo Sebastian celebrates 15 years with the launch of its first-ever luxury shoe line and scarf collection. The seven-piece Italian-made shoe line centres around the iconic ‘Swan Lake’ Ballet Pump, and a nine-piece scarf collection, with each scarf inspired and named after each one of five iconic couture collections, including: Nightingale, Nutcracker, Persephone, East of the Sun and West of the Moon and Wildflowers.

In July 2023, couture house Paolo Sebastian introduced their newest collection, Luminary, which featured in Paris as part of Couture Fashion Week. This marks the brand's highly anticipated return to the fashion capital since the COVID-19 pandemic.

== Couture collections ==
Paolo Sebastian releases two collections each year, often featuring hand-embroidered fabrics and beading. Vasileff designs every piece created by the label, with each collection being inspired by a distinct theme and the fashion house known for its signature expression of a story through couture. The designs are often inspired by fable or fairy tale.

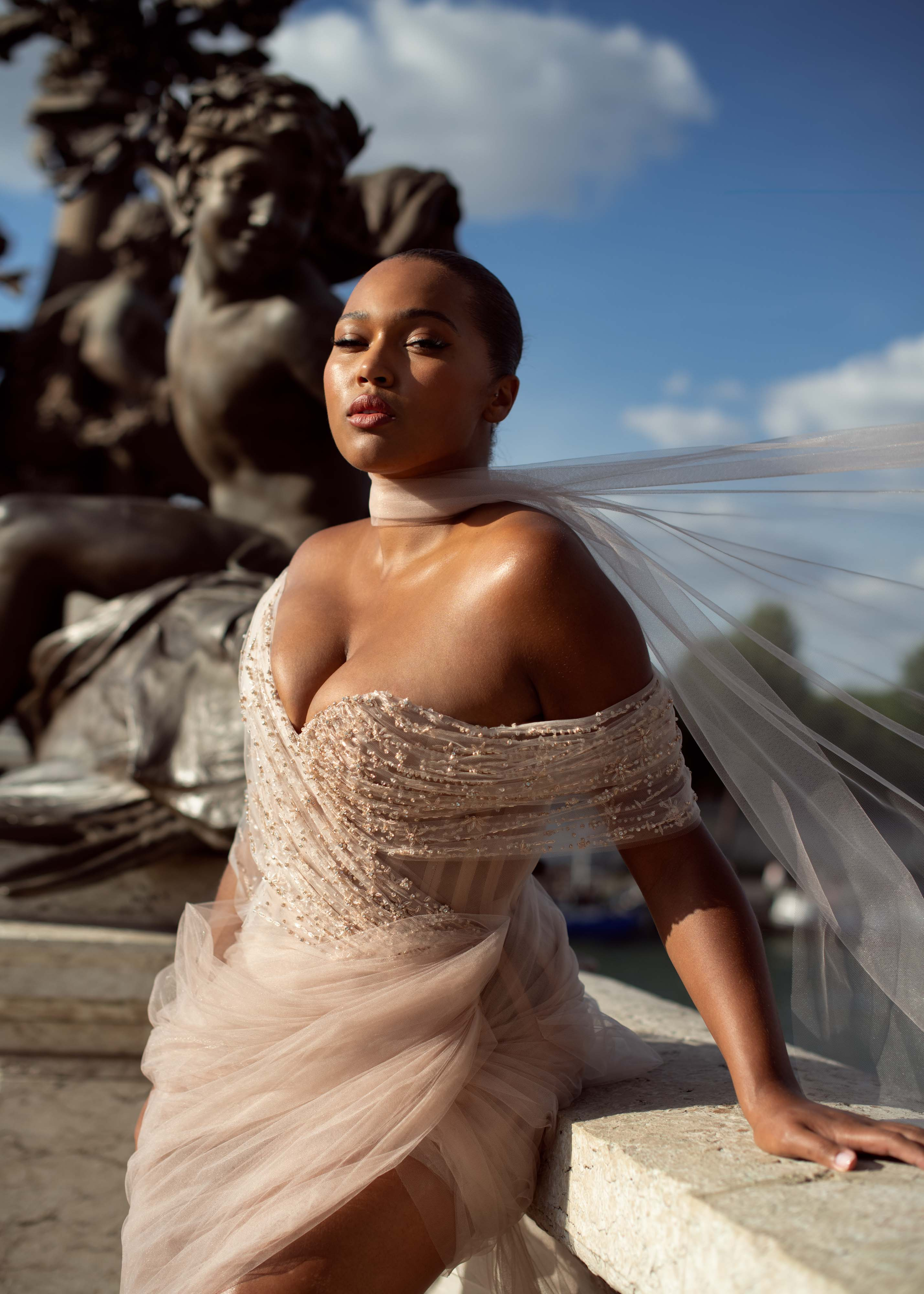
Luminary, 2023-24 Autumn/Winter Couture Collection.

== Media ==
=== Red carpet ===
Paolo Sebastian gowns have been worn at The Academy Awards, the Daytime Emmy Awards, the Grammy Awards, the AACTA Awards and the TV Week Logie Awards.

Met Gala.

Venice Film Festival.

Cannes Film Festival.

=== Notable clients ===
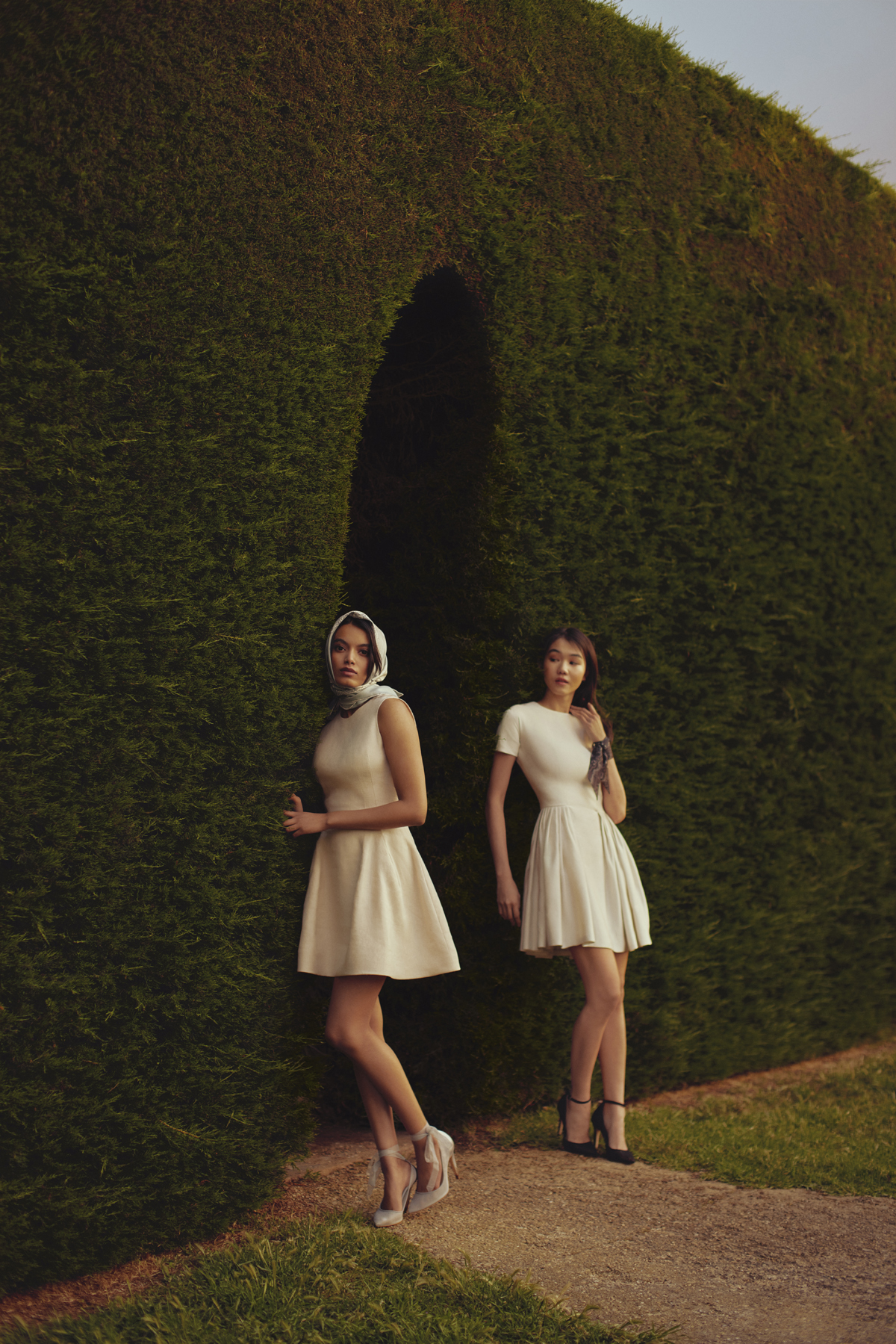
Paolo Sebastian Accessories | Featuring silk scarves and their signature Swan Lake Ballet Pumps.

- Kim Kardashian
- Giuliana Rancic
- Kris Jenner
- Sonam Kapoor
- Corinne Foxx
- Megan Gale
- Delta Goodrem
- Jennifer Hawkins
- Gillian Anderson
- Carrie Bickmore
- Rachel Finch
- Dannii Minogue
- Ada Nicodemou
- Rebecca Judd
- Nadia Bartel
- Kerry Washington
- Julia Michaels
- Mary J. Blige
- Hailee Steinfeld
- Katy Perry
- Hilary Swank

Paolo Sebastian designs have also appeared on The Bold and the Beautiful, Days of Our Lives, Home and Away.
