= Such Is Life: The Troubled Times of Ben Cousins =

- Directed by: Paul Goldman
- Country of origin: Australia
- Original language: English

Production
- Producers: Craig Griffin; Michael Gudinski
- Running time: 99 minutes

Original release
- Release: 25 August 2010

Such Is Life: The Troubled Times of Ben Cousins is a 2010 Australian documentary film about Australian rules football player Ben Cousins. Directed by Paul Goldman and filmed over a two-year period, the documentary charts Cousins' rise to fame as a star player for the West Coast Eagles and explores how his decorated career became marred by controversies, most notably a series of highly publicised drug-related scandals that resulted in him being sacked by his club and banned from playing in the Australian Football League (AFL) for one year.

Cousins helped produce the documentary, stating that he hoped it would serve as a cautionary tale against drug use. It features him talking candidly about his drug addiction, taking various illicit substances, and associating with underworld figures. Among those interviewed for the documentary were family members, friends, and football and media personalities.

Within days of Cousins announcing his retirement from the AFL in 2010, the documentary premiered on Channel Seven and was screened in two parts over successive nights, the first on 25 August. It was a ratings hit and went on to become "one of the most-watched documentaries in Australian history." Critics and audiences were polarised by the film with some calling it a harrowing portrait of Cousins' fall from grace, while others criticised it for glamourising his life of crime and excess.

== Summary ==
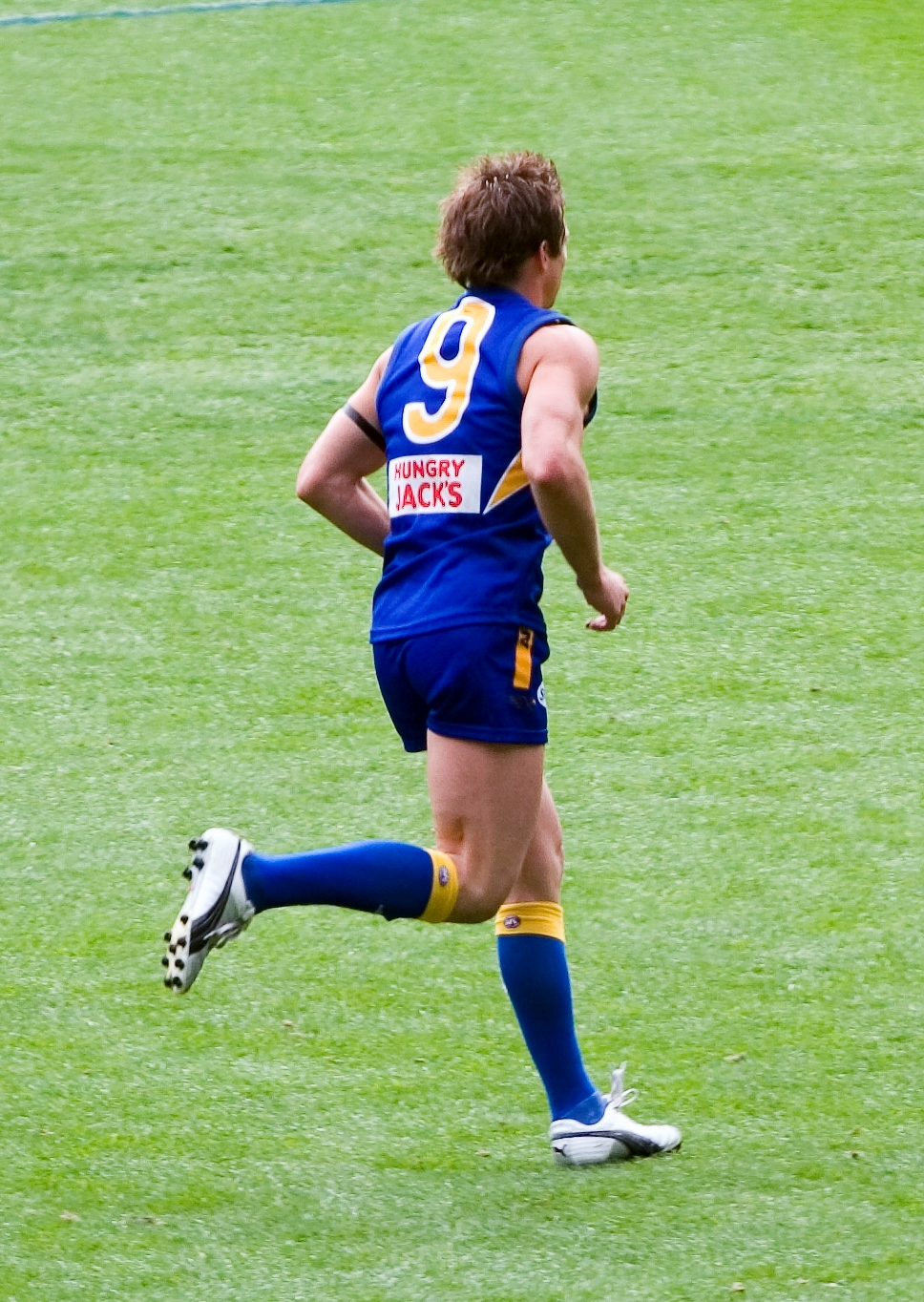
Cousins warming up before the 2005 AFL Grand Final

Such is Life begins with an introductory statement by Cousins, saying he hoped the documentary would serve as a powerful warning against drug use. Through interviews with Cousins and others, it juxtaposes his on-field success as a West Coast Eagles footballer with his developing drug habit, one that he traces to his teenage years. He details how during his career he would go on "benders" and "annihilate and launch into as much as drugs as [he] could", and is shown taking illicit substances, such as snorting cocaine and smoking a crack pipe. While he goes on to condemn such behaviour, he claims that for much of his career, the more drugs he took the better he played.

The documentary covers several major controversies, such as Cousins' association with underworld figures involved in shootings and stabbings in Perth's nightclub scene, and how he was the last person to see West Coast teammate and close friend Chris Mainwaring alive before he died from a cocaine overdose. Losing the 2005 AFL Grand Final is cited as the beginning of Cousins' "fall from grace", evidenced by his swimming the Swan River to escape a booze bus. The periods leading up to and after his 2007 sacking from West Coast and one-year AFL ban are interspersed with stints in rehab, brushes with the law, and instances of drug-induced psychosis. The documentary also reveals that Cousins shaved his body and head in 2008 because he was "paranoid" about failing a hair test as part of a bid to return to the AFL. Cousins closed out his career playing for Richmond, and while the AFL is depicted as wanting to portray him as "cured", he openly admits to being a permanently recovering drug addict.

Insights into Cousins' family and the impact his drug-taking has had on them are found throughout the film. At one point, Cousins' father Bryan speaks of a time when his son expressed suicidal thoughts.

== Production ==
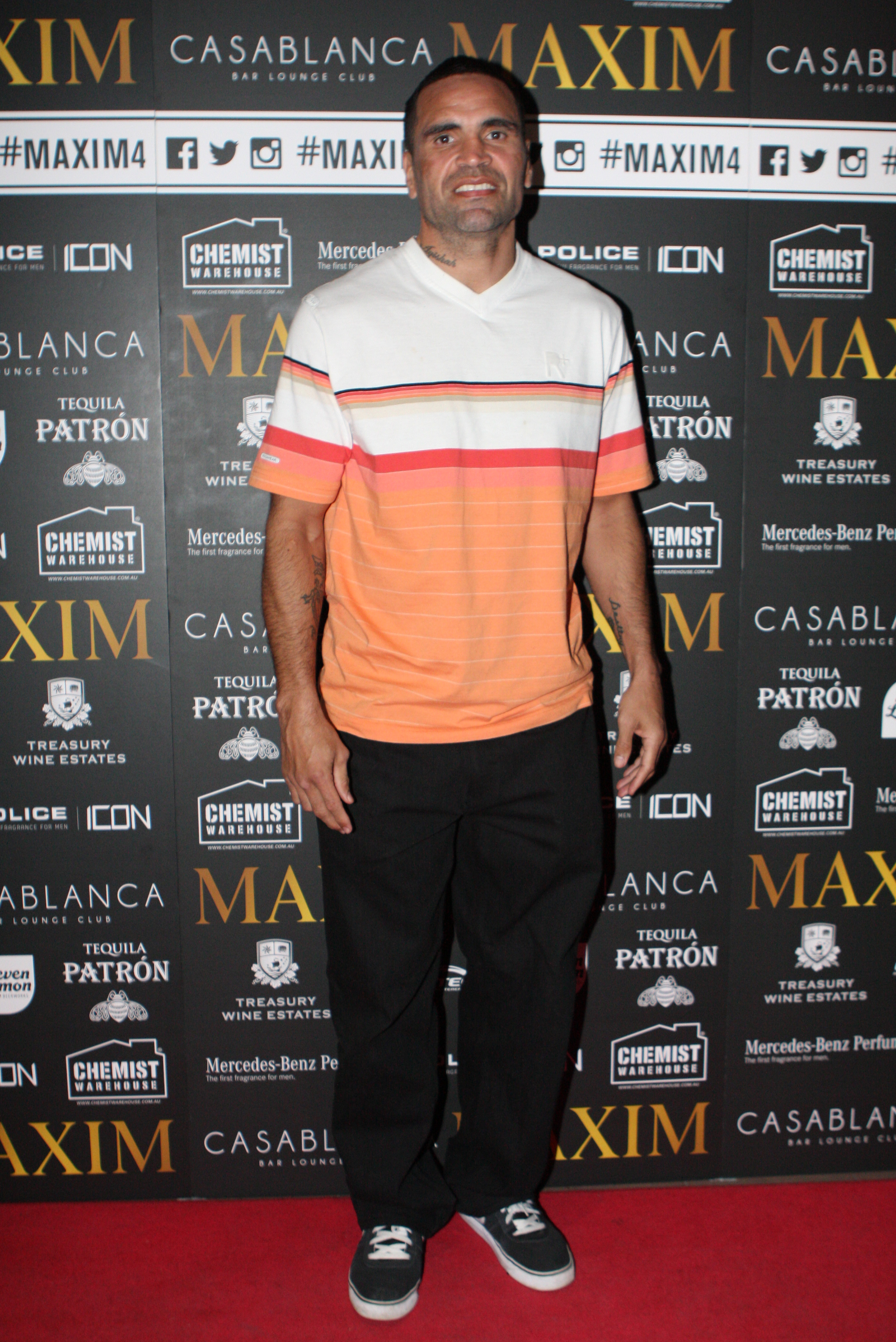
Boxer Anthony Mundine encouraged Cousins to make the film.

Soon after Cousins' ban from the AFL, boxer Anthony Mundine and his manager, Khoder Nasser, suggested to him that he make a film about his life. "He had to do it," Mundine later said. "I didn't know it was going to be so full-on but it has to be that way. You can't make it Hollywood. It's got to be real." Mundine and Nasser introduced Cousins to film producer Paul Butler and editor Scott Walton of Brisbane's 50/50 Films, who "embedded" with the footballer over 2008, "when he was in no-man's land". At times when they could not be there to film Cousins, they left him with a camera to shoot his own activities. The duo had already shot approximately 100 hours of footage when the project was handed to Paul Goldman, known for directing music videos and his controversial 2002 film Australian Rules. Goldman shot another 100 or so hours, and the 200 hours of footage was then cut down to over 90 minutes.

Cousins funded the production in its early stages and is credited as an executive producer. Melbourne entrepreneur and businessman Michael Gudinski helped produce and promote the film.

The title Such is Life is inspired by Cousins' tattoo of Australian bushranger and outlaw Ned Kelly's alleged last words before his execution in 1880.

== Release ==
Channel Seven paid an undisclosed six-figure sum for the rights to Such is Life, and announced on 13 August 2010 that it would air the documentary in two parts on successive nights, beginning later that month on the 25th at 8:30 pm. Episodes of the Australian crime drama City Homicide were pushed to later timeslots to accommodate the new documentary. Prior to its premiere, parts of Such is Life were shown to journalists and football figures, including then CEO of the AFL, Andrew Demetriou, who was reportedly shocked by what he saw.

According to OzTAM figures, the first part had a total national audience of 2.514 million. Nearly 2 million viewers were based in the five mainland capital cities, "an extraordinary result" for Channel Seven. The second part was watched by an average of 1.852 million nationwide. Both parts ranked among Australia's most-watched television programs of the year, beaten only by major sports events such as the 2010 AFL Grand Final and several episodes of MasterChef Australia and the Australian crime drama Underbelly: The Golden Mile.

Anti-drug advertisements were shown throughout the Channel Seven broadcast. The Australian Drug Foundation experienced a combined 400% increase in calls and traffic on its website after the documentary aired.

Such is Life was released on DVD by Mushroom Pictures on 16 September 2010 with a donation from every copy sold going to Cyrenian House, a not-for-profit drug rehabilitation centre.

== Reception ==
Leigh Josey of Crikey reported being engrossed by the film, saying that its "combination of celebrity, drugs, scandal and disgrace proved an addictive cocktail", and that "Cousins has managed to create a documentary that will be required viewing for sports fans for generations." Sportswriter Matthew Webber also commended Cousins for speaking about his drug addiction with "raw honesty" in the film. In a more negative review, David Knox of TV Tonight expressed frustration at the first part's narrative structure, calling it "disjointed" and "frenetic".

Critics were divided on whether the documentary successfully cautioned viewers against drug use. Simon White of The Advertiser wrote that Such is Life would deliver a powerful message to young people: "It is a harrowing story of how a young man with the world at his feet lost his way". He went on to praise it as "a must-see program". Writing for The Sydney Morning Herald, Jim Schembri said: "The film is brutally, painfully, unflinchingly honest about how substance abuse turned a radiant football career into a tabloid train wreck, ... Anybody who sees this film and thinks it glorifies drug use would have to be on drugs." Conversely, Melinda Houston opined in the same newspaper that "the facts of Ben Cousins' life make it hard to see how any lesson can be drawn from his experiences except that even if you do develop a massive drug problem, as long as you're handsome enough and rich enough and talented enough, you'll emerge from it still looking like a Greek god and with a thriving career." According to The Age, a common criticism from commentators and talkback radio callers was that the first part did not "present a stronger case to young people against taking such drugs as amphetamines, ice and ecstasy." Journalist Paul Toohey called the cautionary tale angle an "afterthought" of Cousins. Rather, Toohey writes, the documentary "would be about making money; giving [Cousins] something to do and punishing the media by telling his story on his own terms. He would also punish the AFL, for choosing him to take the drug fall."

The Australian Drug Foundation criticised the film for showing Cousins taking drugs, saying, "the research evidence indicates that to portray drug use is to normalise drug use for some people, and that may glamorise that drug use, show people how to do it, and that can by itself encourage other people." Cousins insisted that the film did not glamourise drugs.

Some reviewers, such as Courtney Walsh for The Australian, pointed out that the documentary failed to answer how Cousins avoided breaching the AFL's drug code for so long despite being a heavy user throughout his career. Australian football legend and SEN radio commentator Kevin Bartlett said it would fail as a documentary due to this omission.

=== Accolades ===
| Award | Category | Subject | Result |
|---|---|---|---|
| Logie Awards | Most Outstanding Factual Program | Channel Seven | Nominated |

== Aftermath ==
Amid speculation that Such is Life could lead to Cousins being charged with drug offences, a spokesperson for the Western Australia Police said that there was not enough proof: "If he wants to come out and tell us 'I took drugs' then we can do something, ... From a video you can't prove that they are actually drugs—he could just say he's a good actor."

In the years after the documentary's release, Cousins re-entered the media spotlight numerous times due to drug-related incidents and strange behaviour in public. He was imprisoned for one year in 2017.
