= Ruth Tarvydas =

Australian fashion designer

- Born: Ruta Anna Tarvydas c. 1947; Kempten, Germany
- Died: 16 May 2014 (aged 66); East Perth, Western Australia

Ruta Anna "Ruth" Tarvydas (c. 1947 – 16 May 2014) was an Australian fashion designer. She opened her first boutique at the age of 19, with her brother, and shortly after established her first label. In 1983, Taryvdas became the first Australian designer to export clothing overseas. By the 2000s, she had designs being sold in 170 outlets across 16 countries, with a number of celebrity clients, both in Australia and overseas. A flagship store in King Street, Perth, was opened in 2009, but closed three years later with Tarvydas in heavy debt. A new store was opened in Claremont in 2012, and was featured with Tarvydas in a 2013 ABC1 documentary. Tarvydas was to debut at Paris Fashion Week in 2014, but she died two months before the event.

== Early life ==
Ruth Tarvydas was born to Lithuanian parents, Martynas and Ursula Tarvydas in Kempten, Germany. In 1949, when Ruth was around two years old, her family emigrated from post-war Germany to Australia, where they settled in Tuart Hill, Western Australia.

== Fashion design ==
=== Early career ===
Before entering fashion design, Tarvydas studied nursing and briefly worked as a secretary for a lawyer and an eye specialist. Aged 19, Tarvydas and her brother Harvey opened a small boutique on Hay Street, Perth, making her possibly Australia's youngest boutique owner at the time. Her first label, 'Ruta', was established in 1968. She was described as 'the designer who brought boho chic to 1960s Perth.'

By 1976, Tarvydas was enjoying success as an ambitious fashion designer, selling her audacious designs from an establishment on Murray Street, Perth. Tarvydas became the first Australian fashion label to export overseas, stocking its designs in Selfridges, London, in 1983. She was also carried by New York's Saks Fifth Avenue around the same time, but during the economic downturn of the late 1980s was forced to close her Australian retail stores.

=== 2000s onward ===
In addition to Australian celebrities such as Delta Goodrem, Sonia Kruger, and the former Miss Universe Jennifer Hawkins, Tarvydas counted Rihanna, Leona Lewis, Kim Kardashian, and Kimberly Stewart among her clients. However, her best known client was probably Rebecca Twigley, for whom Tarvydas designed a notorious red dress in 2004. When Twigley wore the dress to the 2004 Brownlow Medal ceremony (the medal was awarded to her then boyfriend and future husband, Chris Judd), she attracted a great deal of media attention. On News.com.au Twigley's appearance eclipsed coverage for Jennifer Hawkins who was crowned Miss Universe 2004 at the same time, and broke previous records for a single news day. The dress continued receiving ongoing coverage, and, worn by another model, was the final gown in the Tarvydas tribute show at the Perth Fashion Festival. Rebecca Judd opened the tribute show wearing another Tarvydas dress that had been designed for her to wear in a Paco Rabanne perfume advertisement in 2010.

By 2008, Tarvydas had designs sold in 16 countries around the world, exporting designs to over 170 outlets. That year, a Tarvydas retrospective was held in the museum of the Curtin University. The following year, she designed the dress that Rachael Finch, Miss Universe Australia 2009, wore as Australia's "national costume" at the Miss Universe 2009 pageant. Tarvydas opened a flagship boutique on King Street, Perth, in July 2009, but the store was forced to close in October 2012 due to high rental costs. It was replaced by a Chanel boutique.

By the early 2010s, Tarvydas' business found itself increasingly in financial difficulties, entering administration in 2012, at the time the King Street boutique closed. However, in December 2012, supported by businessman John Bond, Tarvydas opened a new shop in Claremont. The following year, Ruth Tarvydas and her business were one of the subjects of a six-part documentary on Perth entrepreneurs, Boomtown, aired by ABC Television, which told the story of the company and its financial difficulties.

== Death ==
On the morning of 16 May 2014, Tarvydas was found dead on the street outside her apartment, where she is believed to have fallen from a 14th-floor balcony in unsuspicious circumstances. She had reportedly failed to meet a deadline the preceding day for repayment of a $100,000 debt to ANZ Banking Group. Tarvydas was to have made her Paris Fashion Week debut in July 2014. Her funeral, at Karrakatta Cemetery, was open to the public, and attended by the Foreign Minister Julie Bishop and by the Lord Mayor of Perth, Lisa Scaffidi.
