= Paul Goldman (director) =

Australian filmmaker

- Born: 1957 (age 68–69); Melbourne, Victoria, Australia
- Occupations: Film director, screenwriter

Paul Goldman (born 1957) is an Australian film director, screenwriter and cinematographer.

== Career ==
Goldman was born in Melbourne, Victoria, Australia, and studied at Swinburne Film and Television School.

He was cinematographer on the 1988 film Ghosts... of the Civil Dead, co-written by Nick Cave and directed by John Hillcoat.

He won the 2002 AACTA Award for Best Adapted Screenplay for Australian Rules, a film he also directed.

Apart from directing feature films and documentaries, Goldman has also directed music videos, including "Nick the Stripper" (1980) by The Birthday Party, and "Better the Devil You Know" (1990) by Kylie Minogue. He won the MTV Video Music Award for Best Male Video for directing Elvis Costello's "Veronica" (1989).

The release of his upcoming feature Kid Snow is announced for June 2024.

== Filmography ==
Year	Title	Notes
2002	Australian Rules	Director and writer
2003	The Night We Called It a Day	Director
2006	Suburban Mayhem	Director
2008	Cannot Buy My Soul	Director
2010	Such is Life: The Troubled Times of Ben Cousins	Director
2024	Kid Snow	Director

== Awards and nominations ==
=== ARIA Music Awards ===
The ARIA Music Awards is an annual awards ceremony that recognises excellence, innovation, and achievement across all genres of Australian music. They commenced in 1987.

Year	Nominee / work	Award	Result	Ref.
1992	Paul Goldman for "Cry" by Lisa Edwards	Best Video	Nominated	
2007	Paul Goldman for "Straight Lines" by Silverchair	Best Video	Won	
