= 2005 Brownlow Medal =

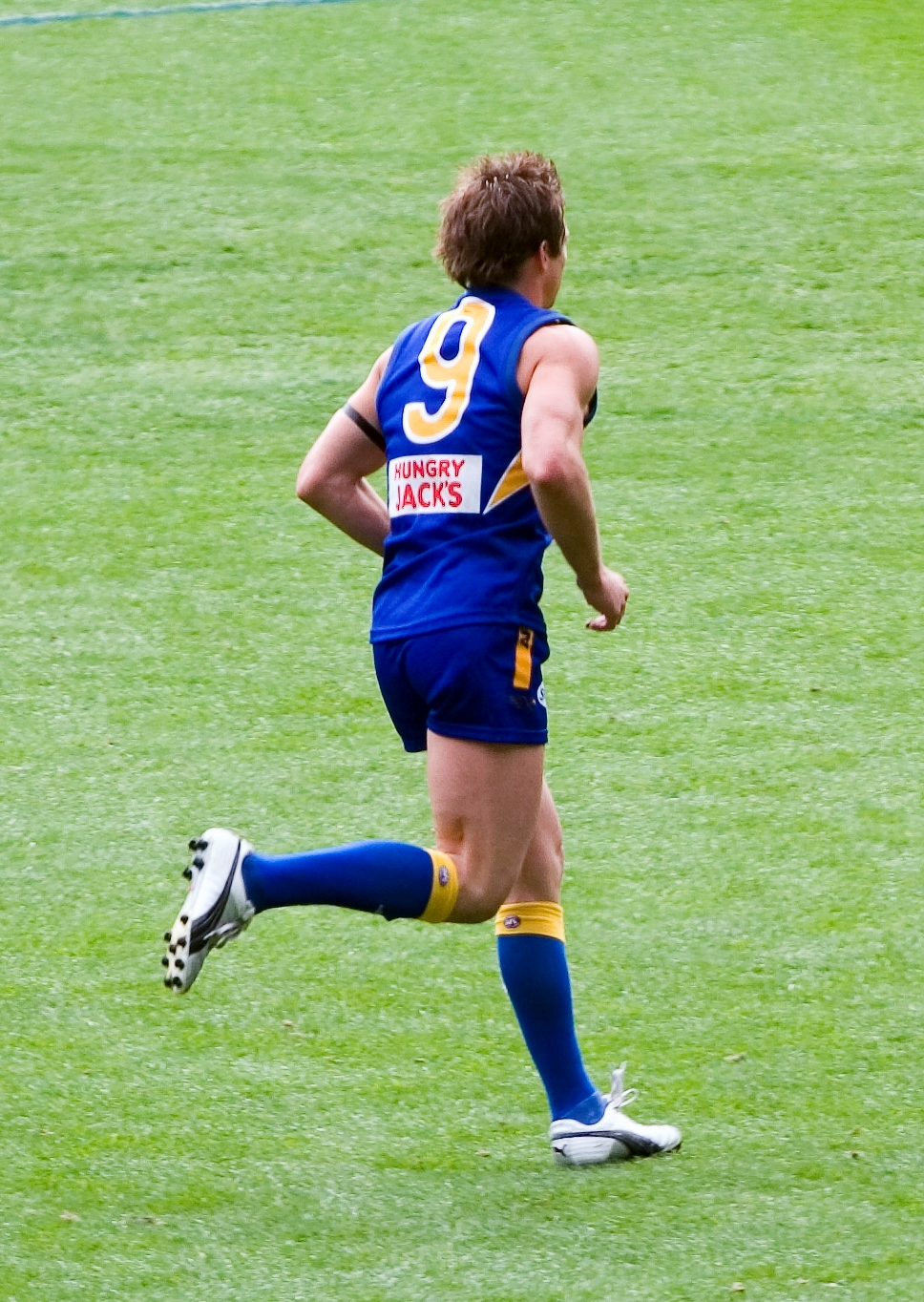
- 2005 Brownlow Medallist, Ben Cousins
- Date: 19 September
- Location: Crown Palladium
- Hosted by: Eddie McGuire
- Winner: Ben Cousins (West Coast); 20 votes

Television/radio coverage
- Network: Nine Network

The 2005 Brownlow Medal was the 78th year the award was presented to the player adjudged the fairest and best player during the Australian Football League (AFL) home and away season. Ben Cousins of the West Coast Eagles won the medal by polling twenty votes during the 2005 AFL season. It was Cousins' first Brownlow Medal win, and with Daniel Kerr finishing the runner up, it was the first time in 79 years that the top two votegetters were from the same club.

== Leading votegetters ==
	Player	Votes
1st	Ben Cousins (West Coast)	20
2nd	Daniel Kerr (West Coast)	19
3rd	Nick Dal Santo (St Kilda)	18
4th	Scott West (Western Bulldogs)	17
=5th	Tyson Edwards (Adelaide)	16
=5th	Barry Hall (Sydney)	16
7th	Luke Hodge (Hawthorn)	15
	Chris Judd (West Coast)*	15
=8th	Matthew Pavlich (Fremantle)	14
=8th	Luke Power (Brisbane)	14
10th	Cameron Ling (Geelong)	13

* The player was ineligible to win the medal due to suspension by the AFL Tribunal during the year.

== Voting procedure ==
The three field umpires (those umpires who control the flow of the game, as opposed to goal or boundary umpires) confer after each match and award three votes, two votes and one vote to the players they regard as the best, second best and third best in the match, respectively. The votes are kept secret until the awards night, and are read and tallied on the evening.

As the medal is awarded to the fairest and best player in the league, those who have been suspended during the season by the AFL Tribunal (or, who avoided suspension only because of a discount for a good record or an early guilty plea) are ineligible to win the award; however, they may still continue to poll votes.
