= Ben Cousins =

Australian rules footballer (born 1978)

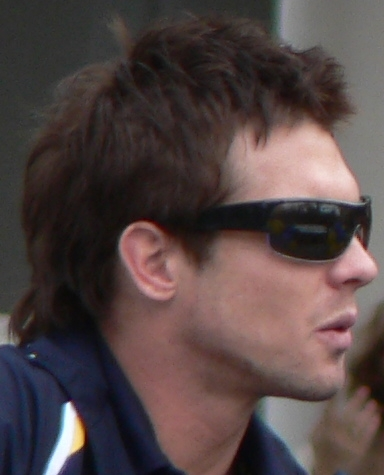
- Cousins with West Coast in 2006

Personal information
- Full name: Benjamin Luke Cousins
- Nicknames: Cuz, Prince of Perth
- Born: 30 June 1978 (age 48); Geelong, Victoria, Australia
- Original team: East Fremantle WAFL
- Draft: Father–son selection, 1995 (West Coast); 6th overall, 2009 Pre-season Draft (Richmond)
- Height: 179 cm (5 ft 10 in)
- Weight: 78 kg (172 lb)
- Position: Midfielder

Playing career^{1}
| Years | Club | Games (Goals) |
| 1996–2007 | West Coast | 238 (205) |
| 2009–2010 | Richmond | 32 (12) |
| Total | | 270 (217) |

International team honours^{2}
| Years | Team | Games (Goals) |
| 1999 | Australia | 2 (0) |
- ^{1} Playing statistics correct to the end of 2010.^{2} Representative statistics correct as of 1999.

Career highlights
- AFL: AFL premiership player: 2006; Brownlow Medal: 2005; Leigh Matthews Trophy: 2005; 6× All-Australian team: 1998, 1999, 2001, 2002, 2005, 2006; AFL Rising Star: 1996; International Rules Series: 1999; West Coast: West Coast Captain: 2001 (co-captain), 2002–2005; 4× West Coast Club Champion: 2001, 2002, 2003, 2005; Geoff Christian Medal: 2001; West Coast Life Member: 2003; West Coast Team 20: 2006; Western Australian Sports Star of the Year: 2005

Benjamin Luke Cousins (born 30 June 1978) is an Australian former professional Australian rules footballer and media presenter. He played 270 games for the West Coast and Richmond in the Australian Football League (AFL) between 1996 and 2010, captained West Coast from 2001 to 2005, won the 2005 Brownlow Medal as the league's best and fairest player, and was a member of West Coast's 2006 premiership side. Cousins is listed by journalist Mike Sheahan as one of the fifty greatest players of all time.

Cousins's playing career was overshadowed by a long-running substance abuse problem, principally involving methamphetamine. He was sacked by West Coast in October 2007 after being arrested for drug possession and the following month was banned by the AFL Commission for 12 months for "bringing the game into disrepute". After being selected by Richmond with the sixth pick of the 2009 pre-season draft he played 32 games across two seasons, retiring at the end of the 2010 season. His addiction was the subject of the 2010 documentary Such is Life: The Troubled Times of Ben Cousins, which aired shortly after his retirement and was one of the year's most-watched programs in Australia.

In the decade following his retirement, Cousins was convicted of a series of criminal offences against the mother of his two children. In March 2017 he was sentenced at Perth Magistrates Court to 12 months' imprisonment after pleading guilty to eleven offences, including aggravated stalking, multiple breaches of a violence restraining order, and possession of methamphetamine; Magistrate Richard Huston described the conduct as "persistent, sustained and intended". He served the sentence at Acacia Prison and was released in January 2018. In November 2020, following a further arrest in April that year, he was convicted of aggravated stalking of the same complainant and sentenced to seven months' imprisonment backdated to his arrest. Australian Associated Press reported at the time that Cousins had accumulated 22 convictions for breaches of restraining orders, 20 of which had resulted in prison sentences.

Since 2023 Cousins has rebuilt a career in Perth media. In June 2023 he began presenting sport for 7NEWS Morning Edition; he appeared as a contestant on the 2024 season of Dancing with the Stars Australia, and in February 2025 joined the Hit Network's Perth breakfast show Pete & Kymba with Ben Cousins on Mix 94.5.

== Early life ==
Cousins was born in Geelong, Victoria, on 30 June 1978, to Stephanie and Bryan, an Australian rules footballer who had moved from Western Australia to play for the Geelong Football Club in the Victorian Football League. When Cousins was 18 months old, his family moved back to Perth, Western Australia, where he was raised with younger siblings Matthew, Sophie and Melanie. He played junior football for the Bull Creek-Leeming Junior Football Club and for his private school, Wesley College. In his last year at Wesley in 1995, he was recruited to join the East Fremantle Football Club's senior side in the West Australian Football League (WAFL) and played for both his school and East Fremantle throughout the season.

While Cousins was still at school, three AFL teams competed to draft him under the father–son rule: the Geelong Football Club, the West Coast Eagles, and the newly formed Fremantle Football Club. Cousins' father Bryan played 238 games for Perth in the WAFL and 67 games for Geelong in the VFL during the 1970s and 1980s. Geelong's recruiting manager, Stephen Wells, said, "Ben barracked for Geelong and we tried everything to get him here." However, Cousins preferred to remain based in Western Australia and chose West Coast in October 1995.

== AFL career ==
=== West Coast Eagles ===
==== 1996–1997: Rising Star Award and increasing popularity ====
At 17, a week after his tenth WAFL game for East Fremantle, Cousins played his first AFL match and kicked two goals for West Coast against Geelong. He won the Norwich Rising Star award for his debut season in 1996, polling 15 votes from the six judges to beat Shannon Grant by one point.

Cousins' popularity continued to increase over the following seasons. In 1998, the Herald Sun ran a two-page article across its centre pages about 20-year-old Cousins, titled "West goes wild for the kid". The article portrayed Cousins as a sex symbol and "football's answer to Brad Pitt". When asked about the article, he said the popularity "comes with the territory... If you want to be a league footballer you have to accept that it is part of the game." Sports agent Ricky Nixon approached Cousins in 1998 about managing his endorsement deals, because "He's good-looking, he elected to stay in Perth and not play in Victoria, opposition coaches take notice of him and on top of that he's a future leader." In 1999, International Management Group, who managed sports stars such as Tiger Woods and Pete Sampras, said they would like to sign Ben, as "There is no doubt that he is now in the top bracket of players and has great marketing potential... Apart from being an outstanding footballer, he is a quality young man." Ross Nicholas, West Coast's marketing manager, said:

"He's easily the most sought-after Eagle... No player was, or is, as popular as Ben. His appeal is so diverse. Kids want his autograph and photograph. Sponsors want him to sit next to them. They want him to push their product... If Ben's well managed, the sky's the limit for him... They've got to find the balance between his commercial potential and his contribution to the community. The club offers protection, but it's up to Ben what demands he puts himself under."

==== 1997–2000: First finals appearance and first All-Australian selection ====
In 1998, Cousins was selected in the All-Australian Team and was runner-up in West Coast's Best and Fairest. He played in his first AFL finals game in 1997 against the Adelaide Crows in a qualifying final at Football Park, and the year included another selection in the All-Australian Team and representing Australia in the International Rules Series. In 2000, Cousins signed a new three-year contract with the West Coast Eagles, reportedly worth nearly A$1 million.

==== 2000–2003: Best and Fairest at West Coast and appointed co-captain ====
He played his 100th game amid speculation he would take over the captaincy from Guy McKenna, who was due to retire after the same game. Cousins said, "After you play two or three seasons, you think of the possibility of a leadership role down the track, but the talk of it has certainly come a lot earlier than I would have thought." In 2001, Cousins was named co-captain, sharing the role with Dean Kemp. He won his first club Best and Fairest at the end of the season, a feat which he repeated in 2002 and 2003, and he was again named in the All-Australian Team in 2001 and 2002. Kemp's retirement saw Cousins become the captain in 2002, a role he filled until 2006. In 2005, West Coast coach John Worsfold said of Cousins' fifth year as captain, "Ben is improving all the time and with the way this group is coming along, I think he is going to be a great leader".

==== 2003–2004: Continued individual success and injuries ====
In early 2003, Cousins injured his ankle in a game against Hawthorn but played on through five weeks of pain-killing injections. In Round 15, 2004, he injured his back and missed six games. Cousins said, "That injury is something that I got over and am probably no chance of getting a relapse... The other side to it is, because I have played 10 years of consistent AFL footy, I've probably got an older back than someone my age". In Round 1, 2005, he dislocated a finger and missed one round after undergoing an operation. West Coast chief executive Trevor Nesbitt said, "There's no doubt that he's at his best when under pressure and he's so resilient; he plays with injuries that other players wouldn't".

==== 2004–2006: Brownlow Medal and Grand Final berth ====
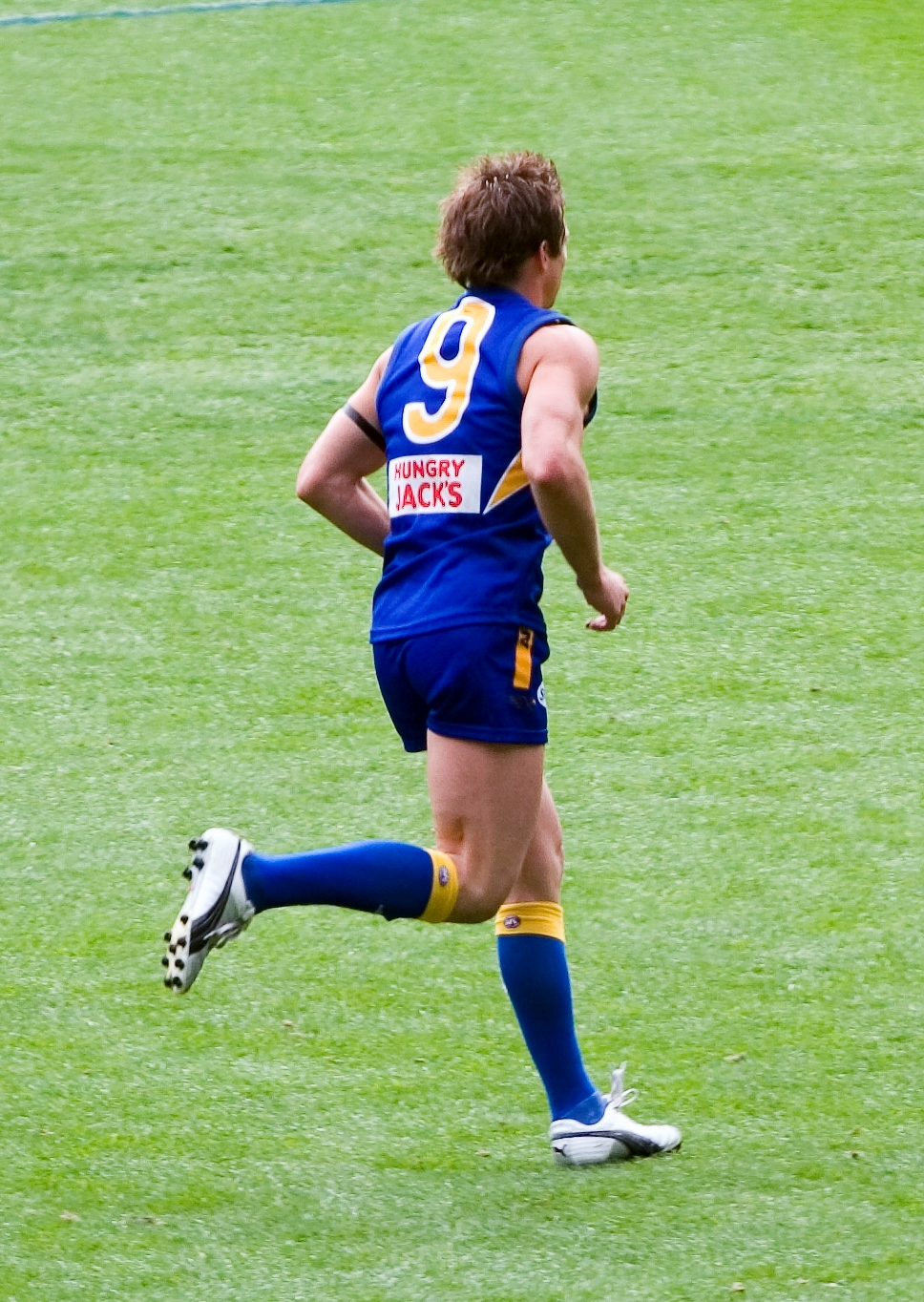
Cousins warming up before the 2005 Grand Final

After Cousins played his 200th game in July 2005 he was given a "rousing reception from 41,524 grateful fans", as video clips of his ten years at West Coast were shown at the end of the game. Cousins was "possibly the highest-profile sportsman in Western Australia", the youngest of the 10 West Coast players to reach 200 games and the 14th youngest in the history of the AFL/VFL.

Cousins won the Brownlow Medal, the AFL's highest individual player award, on 19 September 2005 with 20 votes, ahead of teammate Daniel Kerr on 19 votes and Nick Dal Santo on 18 votes. Cousins was the favourite to win with bookmakers, after five previous top-10 finishes. He did not attend the award ceremony in Melbourne, remaining in Perth to prepare for West Coast's Grand Final match against Sydney Swans the following weekend. His celebration was "very quiet, I went over to the bar, bought the folks a bottle of champagne, had one lemonade and went up to the (hotel) room. I managed to get to sleep before midnight, which was a bonus." West Coast's last training session in Perth before travelling to their first Grand Final game since 1994 was attended by 3,000 fans. Trevor Nesbitt, West Coast's chief executive, said he expected that the combination of the team's Grand Final appearance, Cousins' Brownlow win, and Chris Judd's Brownlow win in the previous year, would lead to a turnover of around $2 million in club merchandise. Nesbitt added:

"It's quite a special time for the club and it's probably worth $1 million to WA footy as a minimum I would think... The performances of Chris and Ben assist us in raising more money for WA football and their contribution is just outstanding. They're marquee players and, apart from everything else that happens with them, they are extremely beneficial for all West Australians."

West Coast lost the 2005 Grand Final to Sydney by four points, but as well as his Brownlow win, Cousins was awarded another West Coast Best and Fairest and the players' Most Valuable Player award, with 159 votes compared to runner-up Matthew Pavlich's 99 votes. He was runner-up to Barry Hall in the coaches' player of the year award, and in statistics, had 612 disposals, 24 goals, and ranked in the top five of the league in nine of the 12 categories.

==== 2006–2007: Premiership Cup, off-field misconduct and captaincy resignation ====
In February 2006, Cousins resigned his captaincy after an off-field incident where he fled a booze bus. In May 2006, he signed a new three-year contract with West Coast, and in September 2006, West Coast won the Grand Final, defeating Sydney by one point. Cousins was suspended indefinitely by West Coast on 20 March 2007 after missing two training sessions. It was later confirmed that Cousins had a substance abuse problem. After returning from four weeks of rehabilitation in Malibu, California, for substance abuse, Cousins was offered an amended contract by West Coast, rumoured to contain strict conditions such as repaying the cost of rehab and undertaking regular drug tests. On 29 June 2007, Cousins was given clearance by the AFL to resume training with the West Coast Eagles, which he did the following Monday. However, he injured a hamstring in training, delaying his comeback until West Coast's home game against Sydney on 21 July at Subiaco Oval. He gained 38 disposals and six marks in the game, inspiring West Coast's win.

==== 2007–2008: Drug possession arrest, West Coast Eagles delistment, and 12-month AFL ban ====
On 16 October 2007, Cousins' car was stopped in Northbridge and searched. He was arrested for drug possession and refusing to submit to a blood test. The Eagles sacked him the next day, which meant that he was no longer a registered AFL player. On 19 November, he was banned from playing senior football for 12 months by the AFL Commission for "bringing the game into disrepute", and was formally delisted by West Coast on 30 November. Eagles officials said that he would never appear in an Eagles guernsey again, and AFL CEO Andrew Demetriou said it would be "extremely difficult" for him to ever return to the AFL.

=== Richmond Tigers ===
==== 2008–2010: Career renewal at Richmond Tigers and retirement ====
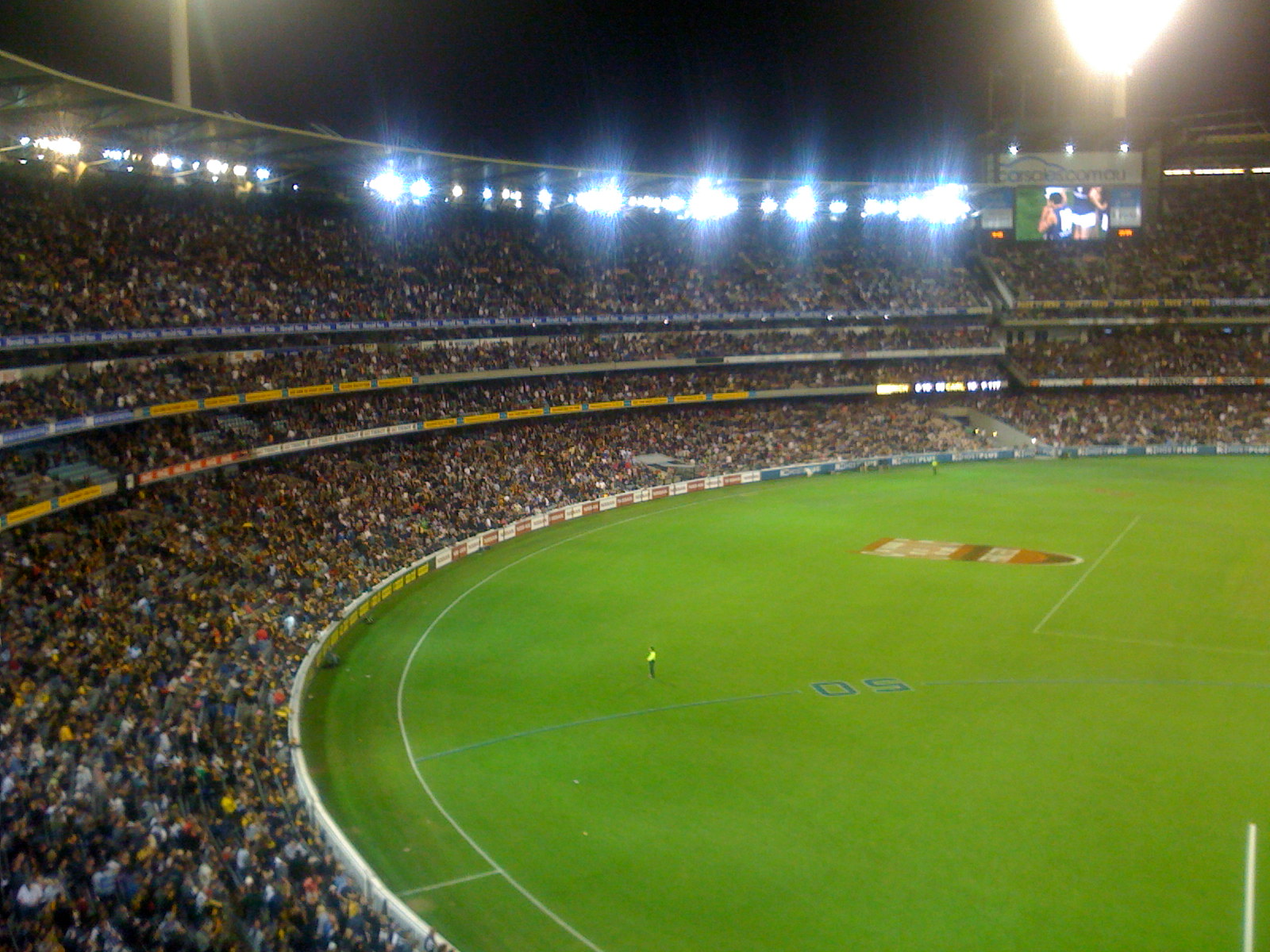
"The man who sold out the MCG": Cousins' AFL return helped break the attendance record for a Richmond versus Carlton match.

In November 2008, the AFL Commission cleared Cousins to play AFL football in 2009. The Commission ruled that Cousins must submit to regular drug tests, including urine testing up to three times per week and hair testing up to four times annually. Cousins attended drug testing in early November with no body hair long enough to sample.

Several teams showed an interest in drafting Cousins for 2009, including Collingwood Football Club, St Kilda Football Club and Brisbane Lions. Collingwood sent a private investigator to Perth to follow Cousins for several days. After meeting with Victorian Chief Commissioner of Police Christine Nixon in October 2008, Collingwood announced that they would not draft Cousins. In November, after reviewing Cousins and consulting stakeholders for five months, St Kilda said they would not draft him. The day before the national draft, Brisbane issued a media release that said they would not be drafting Cousins. On 29 November 2008, Cousins was not selected in the AFL National Draft.

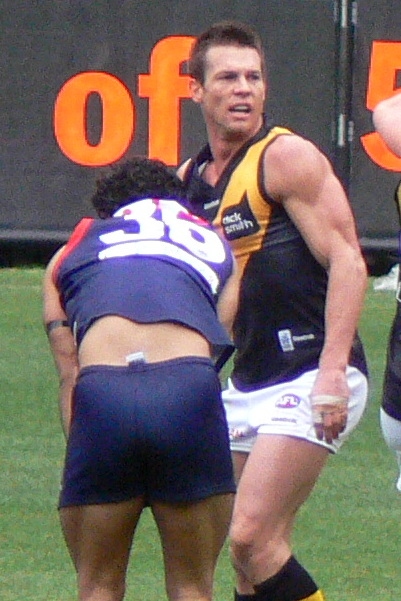
Cousins (right) playing for Richmond in 2009

Ahead of the AFL Pre-season Draft in December 2008, Richmond Football Club approached the AFL Commission for approval to move injured senior player Graham Polak to its rookie list in order to obtain a second draft pick in the pre-season draft, which it said it would use to select Cousins. The AFL Commission had given approval to Essendon two years earlier to do similar with Adam Ramanauskas during his battle with cancer. The commission, with the support of the AFLPA and most of the clubs, denied Richmond's request. However, Richmond selected Cousins with its only Pre-season Draft selection (#6 overall) on 16 December. Following this Richmond received an influx of new club members and Cousins trained with the team the following day in front of a crowd of around 2,000. In Richmond's Round 1 game against Carlton on 26 March, Cousins strained his hamstring during the final quarter. He played a game with the Coburg Football Club in the Victorian Football League before returning to the AFL in Round 7 against Brisbane.

On 17 August 2010, after weeks of speculation by the media, Cousins announced his retirement in front of his family and huge crowd. During the speech, he thanked everyone who had assisted him during his career, acknowledged his encounters with drugs and the law, and apologised to his family for the situation he had put them in:

I'll always regret what I've put my family through. There's a lot of shame and regret. People wonder why I haven't broken down or shed a tear (in public). My tears are something that I hold close to me; they're for me and my family.

== Statistics ==
Legend
| G | Goals | K | Kicks | D | Disposals | T | Tackles |
| B | Behinds | H | Handballs | M | Marks |

| Led the league for the season only |
| Led the league after finals only |
| Led the league after season and finals |

| Season | Team | No. | Games | Totals | | | | | | | Averages (per game) | | | | | | |
| Season | Team | No. | Games | G | B | K | H | D | M | T | G | B | K | H | D | M | T |
|---|---|---|---|---|---|---|---|---|---|---|---|---|---|---|---|---|---|
| 1996 | West Coast | 35 | 20 | 34 | 15 | 170 | 106 | 276 | 61 | 24 | 1.7 | 0.8 | 8.5 | 5.3 | 13.8 | 3.1 | 1.2 |
| 1997 | West Coast | 35 | 18 | 22 | 13 | 149 | 114 | 263 | 48 | 21 | 1.2 | 0.7 | 8.3 | 6.3 | 14.6 | 2.7 | 1.2 |
| 1998 | West Coast | 9 | 23 | 20 | 13 | 294 | 195 | 489 | 63 | 33 | 0.9 | 0.6 | 12.8 | 8.5 | 21.3 | 2.7 | 1.4 |
| 1999 | West Coast | 9 | 22 | 14 | 13 | 310 | 205 | 515 | 75 | 25 | 0.6 | 0.6 | 14.1 | 9.3 | 23.4 | 3.4 | 1.1 |
| 2000 | West Coast | 9 | 17 | 9 | 11 | 261 | 170 | 431 | 67 | 34 | 0.5 | 0.6 | 15.4 | 10.0 | 25.4 | 3.9 | 2.0 |
| 2001 | West Coast | 9 | 22 | 15 | 7 | 335 | 265 | 600 | 63 | 34 | 0.7 | 0.3 | 15.2 | 12.0 | 27.3 | 2.9 | 1.5 |
| 2002 | West Coast | 9 | 23 | 16 | 11 | 327 | 229 | 556 | 56 | 57 | 0.7 | 0.5 | 14.2 | 10.0 | 24.2 | 2.4 | 2.5 |
| 2003 | West Coast | 9 | 23 | 20 | 8 | 295 | 225 | 520 | 68 | 42 | 0.9 | 0.3 | 12.8 | 9.8 | 22.6 | 3.0 | 1.8 |
| 2004 | West Coast | 9 | 17 | 8 | 7 | 203 | 166 | 369 | 52 | 38 | 0.5 | 0.4 | 11.9 | 9.8 | 21.7 | 3.1 | 2.2 |
| 2005 | West Coast | 9 | 24 | 24 | 11 | 391 | 221 | 612 | 146 | 33 | 1.0 | 0.5 | 16.3 | 9.2 | 25.5 | 6.1 | 1.4 |
| 2006 | West Coast | 9 | 22 | 20 | 13 | 312 | 241 | 553 | 107 | 39 | 0.9 | 0.6 | 14.2 | 11.0 | 25.1 | 4.9 | 1.8 |
| 2007 | West Coast | 9 | 7 | 3 | 3 | 90 | 85 | 175 | 19 | 16 | 0.4 | 0.4 | 12.9 | 12.1 | 25.0 | 2.7 | 2.3 |
| 2009 | Richmond | 32 | 15 | 5 | 3 | 154 | 204 | 358 | 42 | 45 | 0.3 | 0.2 | 10.3 | 13.6 | 23.9 | 2.8 | 3.0 |
| 2010 | Richmond | 32 | 17 | 7 | 6 | 156 | 220 | 376 | 68 | 48 | 0.4 | 0.4 | 9.2 | 12.9 | 22.1 | 4.0 | 2.8 |
| Career | | | 270 | 217 | 134 | 3447 | 2646 | 6093 | 935 | 489 | 0.8 | 0.5 | 12.8 | 9.8 | 22.6 | 3.5 | 1.8 |

== Honours and achievements ==
**Brownlow Medal votes**
| Season | Votes |
| 1996 | 3 |
| 1997 | 1 |
| 1998 | 18 |
| 1999 | 15 |
| 2000 | 8 |
| 2001 | 18 |
| 2002 | 16 |
| 2003 | 21 |
| 2004 | 4 |
| **2005** | **20** |
| 2006 | 13 |
| 2007 | 4 |
| 2009 | 5 |
| 2010 | 2 |
| **Total** | **148** |
Key:
Green / **Bold** = Won

- **Team**
  - AFL Premiership (West Coast): 2006
  - McClelland Trophy (West Coast): 2006
- **Individual**
  - Brownlow Medal: 2005
  - Leigh Matthews Trophy (AFLPA MVP Award): 2005
  - All-Australian: 1998, 1999, 2001, 2002, 2005, 2006
  - Australian Football Media Association Player of the Year Award: 2005
  - John Worsfold Medal (West Coast Eagles Best & Fairest): 2001, 2002, 2003, 2005
  - Herald Sun Player of the Year Award: 2005
  - Lou Richards Medal: 2005
  - Australian Representative Honours in International rules football: 1999
  - **West Coast Eagles – Team 20**
  - Geoff Christian Medal: 2001
  - Western Australian Sports Star of the Year: 2005
  - Goal of the Year: 1999
  - AFL Rising Star Award: 1996
  - AFL Rising Star Nominee: 1996 (Round 12)
  - West Coast Eagles Life Membership Inductee: 2003

== Media career ==
In June 2023, Cousins commenced presenting the sport on 7NEWS Morning Edition in Perth.

In early 2024, Seven Network announced that Cousins would appear as a contestant on the twenty-first season of Dancing with the Stars Australia. He was the fifth contestant to be eliminated. His casting drew criticism from commentators who questioned the appropriateness of a mainstream family entertainment role in light of his stalking convictions.

In February 2025, Cousins joined the Hit Network to co-host the Western Australian breakfast radio show Pete & Kymba with Pete Curulli and Kymba Cahill on Mix 94.5; the show was subsequently renamed Pete & Kymba with Ben Cousins. Cousins' appointment to the show and his wider media comeback were criticised by commentators and family-violence researchers. Writing in Pedestrian.TV, Rachel Choy argued that the Seven Network had rewarded a convicted stalker with a mainstream hosting role. Professor Silke Meyer, Adjunct Professor at Monash University's Gender and Family Violence Prevention Centre, told Mamamia that the coverage of Cousins' return to television "completely erases the experiences of his ex-partner and children", and that celebrating a "comeback" risked sidelining women's and children's experiences of violence.

Cousins has engaged in speaking events since at least 2025, when he appeared alongside former jockey Damien Oliver. In 2026 he had events booked in WA with former Tigers team-mate Dustin Martin and Eagles coach John Worsfold in addition to solo events in Victoria. The Victorian tour, titled Ben Cousins Raw, promised to reveal details about Cousins' troubled history with drug abuse and imprisonment for domestic violence. An appearance in Ballarat was subsequently cancelled after community members opposed the event, arguing it was inappropriate considering the region's extensive issues with domestic violence.

== Personal life ==
=== Early professional career ===
In 1997, Cousins took part in an education campaign for the WA Asthma Foundation. During his first year in the AFL, Cousins said his chest often felt tight and he had difficulty playing, "but if I monitored my asthma correctly and took the right medication, I was able to overcome those effects". In 1999, he had a mild asthma attack while warming up for a game against Melbourne, then fainted while at a restaurant after the game. West Coast's football manager, Rod Lester-Smith, said Cousins may have been affected by asthma, low blood pressure from playing the game earlier, and a corked leg that caused some internal bleeding. He was taken to Murdoch Hospital and recovered quickly.

West Coast coach Ken Judge was told by a Perth detective in 2001 that Cousins and two of his teammates may have been using illegal drugs. Judge passed this information on to the club's administration but no action was taken.

In September 2002, Cousins punched teammate Daniel Kerr at the club's best and fairest award celebrations, after an argument about Kerr's relationship with Cousins' sister Melanie. The altercation resulted in Cousins breaking his arm.

In May 2005, Cousins and teammate Michael Gardiner were questioned about their acquaintance with John Kizon and Troy Mercanti, two Perth underworld figures who were allegedly involved in a stabbing and shooting at Perth's Metro City nightclub. Cousins was in Melbourne at the time of the shooting, but it was claimed that he and Gardiner had received phone calls from the figures both before and after the incident at the nightclub. Police questioned Cousins and Gardiner about the incident but they refused to co-operate. Newspaper columnists at The West Australian and talkback radio callers demanded Cousins resign his captaincy. His judgment had previously been questioned by West Coast management after he and Gardiner were photographed entering Crown Casino with Kizon in 2001. However, no disciplinary action was taken. Trevor Nesbitt, the team's chief executive, said:

"We are prepared to give them more than one chance. In this case, it is maybe their last chance... They have had chances before, they have had opportunities before, they have made mistakes before. It gets to the point where those mistakes can't be tolerated any longer. This hurts us. It hurts our brand. It hurts our image."

=== Troubled years ===
On 12 February 2006, Cousins fled a booze bus, abandoning his Mercedes-Benz and girlfriend Samantha Druce in the middle lane of Perth's Canning Highway and running from police with a male passenger. The male passenger was later caught and breath-tested, but Cousins eluded the police by swimming into the Swan River. On 20 February, Cousins resigned as captain of the West Coast Eagles. He pleaded guilty to obstructing the path of another driver and obstructing a public officer in court in March 2006 and was fined $900 plus costs. He was fined an additional $5,000 by West Coast.

On 3 December 2006, Cousins was arrested for public intoxication after passing out in front of Crown Casino in Melbourne and spent four hours in jail. He was released without being fined or making a court appearance. The West Coast Eagles later announced that the club would not discipline Cousins, stating that the media scrutiny was sufficient punishment.

In early March 2007, Cousins and his girlfriend of 13 years, Samantha Druce, ended their relationship. On 20 March, Cousins was suspended indefinitely from West Coast after failing to attend two training sessions. West Coast club chairman Dalton Gooding stated at a press conference that Cousins was facing a "number of personal and professional issues" and that "Over the past few weeks those issues have come to the surface and it's time that Ben was suspended from the club to go away and try to tackle those issues head on." He also said:

"We always said we would suspend players if they reoffended and Ben has reoffended by missing training, and we have been very consistent with that … We believe he's breached his contract and acted unprofessionally and that's why he's been suspended and that's why we're giving him every opportunity to fix up his personal and private issues."

It was later revealed that Cousins underwent an AFL drug test on 19 March 2007, and it was later confirmed that he had a substance abuse problem. On 21 March, Cousins was admitted to drug rehabilitation. On 22 March, his father Bryan released a statement in a video broadcast by Network Ten:

"I am making this statement today not on behalf of Ben, but as a father on behalf of his son... Ben's problem relates to substance abuse and he faces a great challenge... We acknowledge the public scrutiny that comes with the opportunities and privileges that Ben has had, but I ask now with the issues that Ben faces, that my son be given the privacy and the opportunity that he needs to deal with this problem... Ben, you are not alone with this challenge. Your family, your friends, your fans and your footy club want you to overcome this issue and win in the same manner in which you have done throughout your whole career."

=== Rehabilitation commences ===
At the end of March 2007, Cousins flew to Malibu, California, United States for rehabilitation at the Summit Center where he stayed for four weeks. He returned to Perth on 30 April 2007, with much attention from the media. On 4 May, he released a televised apology, saying:

"As you are aware, I have been at an overseas rehabilitation centre for the past month undergoing treatment for a number of personal issues, including illness as the result of substance use... I apologise to the West Coast Eagles Football Club, sponsors, the AFL and the community for my actions... I know that in order to play football again I will have to be accepted back by the players and staff of the West Coast Eagles and the AFL, and I'm willing to fulfil any obligations imposed on me. At the present time I don't know when I'll play again. My priority is to regain my health, my life and my standing."

Chris Mainwaring, a former West Coast Eagles player and close friend of Cousins, died of a drug overdose on 1 October 2007. Cousins received renewed media attention, as he was the last person to see Mainwaring alive, having visited him twice on the night of his death to provide emotional support and deliver food. On 16 October, Cousins was arrested in the Perth suburb of Northbridge after police pulled over his vehicle because of "the manner of his driving". Cousins' vehicle was searched, and he was charged with failure to comply with a police-ordered drug assessment and possession of a prohibited drug, the police having found quantities of prescription drugs diazepam, Viagra, oxycodone and Caverta as well as traces of ecstasy and cocaine on a $20 note in the car. Cousins was sacked by West Coast for serious breaches of his agreement with the club the day after his arrest. On 19 October, Cousins's lawyer, Shane Brennan, reported that police would drop the drug-related charges against him. On 27 October, Cousins flew to Los Angeles to continue his drug rehabilitation at the Summit Center. The media reported that Cousins was missing and had failed to attend treatment in Malibu, and he was admitted to hospital several days later after an alleged cocaine binge. No charges were laid by US police. He returned to Australia and told a packed media conference that he was "overcoming a drug addiction". A week later he flew to the Gold Coast for a three-day alcohol and drug binge during Schoolies week.

A painting of Cousins titled Waiting for the Day reached the finals of the 2009 Archibald Prize. Painted by South Australian artist Megan Roodenrys, it shows Cousins in bed battling through a sleepless night during his drug scandal. The painting was bought at auction by a Melbourne businessman the following year for $18,000.

In March 2010, Cousins was twice admitted to Epworth Hospital after suffering from abdominal pain and cramping. The Richmond Football Club denied reports that it had warned Cousins to curb his drinking amid fears his AFL career could be shortened by excessive alcohol consumption. On 12 April, Cousins was among four Richmond players suspended by the club after a drunken escapade at the team hotel in Sydney earlier that week. Although Cousins was not intoxicated, the club deemed that he had not acted responsibly or in a manner expected of him by the club, and he was suspended for one week. On 5 July, Cousins was admitted to hospital after a "severe reaction to prescribed sleeping medication". His hospitalisation prompted debate over the use of legal stimulants such as caffeine and legal sedatives such as sleeping pills among sportspeople, with the Premier of Victoria, John Brumby, disapproving of their use.

"It's pretty damning. There's no point putting something to air only [for Cousins] to be deregistered for life two minutes after it goes to air."

— Cousins' former manager Ricky Nixon on why Such is Life was not broadcast publicly until after Cousins retired

A feature-length documentary on Cousins' personal problems, filmed over a two-year period, aired on the Seven Network in August 2010. Titled Such is Life, it is named after bushranger and outlaw Ned Kelly's alleged last words, which Cousins got tattooed across his torso in 2007. Cousins is featured taking illicit drugs, speaking candidly about his addiction and saying that he hopes his story will ultimately help to save lives. It was one of the year's most-watched programs in Australia, with over two million viewers nationwide. In November of that year, Cousins released an autobiography, Ben Cousins: My Life Story, published by Macmillan Australia.

== Legal issues ==
In May 2011, it was reported that since Cousins' departure from AFL football his life had lost direction: he had failed to commit to a mining job in Western Australia and was struggling to find focus. His father confirmed that his son's attempt to rebuild his life had taken a "couple of bad turns" in the previous three months and that he was battling "troubled times".

On 9 January 2012, Cousins was admitted to Sir Charles Gairdner Hospital after suffering a fall at a drug rehabilitation clinic. He slipped while getting out of a shower, striking his head on a basin and injuring his neck. It was reported that Cousins had been experiencing continuing problems with illicit drugs, despite seeking help at several drug rehabilitation clinics, and that he had "never been clean for more than three months." It was also reported that he had recently undertaken an extreme drug binge lasting for approximately eight days. Cousins was committed by doctors to a suburban mental health unit under police escort on 13 January 2012 after suffering a four-day episode of drug-induced psychosis while being treated at Sir Charles Gardiner Hospital.

On 27 March 2012, Cousins was arrested by police at Esperance Airport, in the south of Western Australia, on suspicion of possession of drugs. He was strip-searched and found to have methamphetamine secreted in his anus. The initial charge of intent to sell or supply the drug was later downgraded to simple possession, to which Cousins pled guilty and was fined $800. On 17 April 2012, Cousins was arrested and charged again in Western Australia for possession of cannabis and a smoking implement.

On 11 March 2015, Cousins was arrested in the Perth suburb of Bicton after leading police on a slow-speed car chase, stating he could not stop due to a family emergency. Four days later, it was reported that Cousins had been sent to a mental health facility after he was found inside the Special Air Service's Campbell Barracks in Swanbourne. Cousins was arrested for the third time in two weeks after trying to outrun police in Canning Vale following a "bizarre incident" outside a Sikh temple.

In June 2016, police intervened when Cousins attempted to direct traffic on Perth's Canning Highway. He was described by witnesses as being "really lost, confused and making no sense at all", and taken to Fiona Stanley Hospital.

In November 2016, Cousins failed to appear in court on charges of breaching a violence restraining order and possessing methamphetamine. A bench warrant was issued for his arrest. At around 1:30 am the following day, while driving high on methamphetamine in High Wycombe, he crashed his car head-on into a truck. He sustained minor injuries and was taken to Royal Perth Hospital under police guard.

=== 2017 imprisonment for aggravated stalking ===
Cousins was arrested in the Perth suburb of Melville in February 2017 and charged with a number of drug, violence and stalking offences, including seven counts of breaching a violence restraining order taken out by Maylea Tinecheff, the mother of his two children. Police alleged his conduct included approaches at Tinecheff's home, her church and the children's school, and large numbers of unwanted phone calls and text messages.

On 28 March 2017, Cousins pleaded guilty before Magistrate Richard Huston at Perth Magistrates Court to eleven offences, including aggravated stalking of Tinecheff, multiple breaches of the violence restraining order, possession of methamphetamine and possession of a smoking implement. Huston, who described the conduct as "persistent, sustained and intended", sentenced him to 12 months' imprisonment, fined him a further $2,400 and suspended his driver's licence for nine months. Cousins served the sentence at Acacia Prison. He became eligible for parole in August 2017 but the parole board denied his application and ordered him to complete rehabilitation courses after he failed a drug test; he was released in January 2018.

=== 2018 charges, 2019 plea ===
As part of his parole conditions, Cousins began part-time work in the West Coast Eagles' community and game development department after his January 2018 release, but he abruptly left the job in April 2018. On 22 August 2018, he was arrested in Canning Vale and charged with 16 offences, including aggravated burglary, aggravated stalking, threatening to harm Tinecheff and possession of methamphetamine with intent to sell or supply. At a bail hearing before Magistrate Andrew Maughan at Armadale Magistrates Court, prosecutors alleged that Cousins had threatened Tinecheff and had got into a car with her while holding a screwdriver; bail was refused. He was granted bail in April 2019.

In September 2019, the charges of stalking and threatening to harm Tinecheff were dropped and Cousins pleaded guilty to 12 lesser offences; he was sentenced to eight months' imprisonment, backdated to his August 2018 arrest, and released shortly afterwards.

=== 2020 imprisonment for aggravated stalking ===
On 22 April 2020, Cousins was arrested in East Victoria Park and charged with 15 offences, including aggravated stalking of Tinecheff, 13 breaches of a family violence restraining order between 2 and 15 April 2020, and possession of approximately 2.5 grams of methamphetamine.

On 4 November 2020, Magistrate Brian Mahon of Armadale Magistrates Court convicted Cousins of one count of aggravated stalking, finding he had bombarded Tinecheff with text messages and phone calls — as many as 29 in a single day — and sentenced him to seven months' imprisonment, backdated to his arrest.

During the trial, Tinecheff told the court that Cousins had been abusive to their children when affected by drugs, and that she had been frightened to discover he had located the family after they had relocated.

Cousins was acquitted of 20 associated counts of breaching the family violence restraining order after Mahon found the prosecution had not proved that the order was in force at the relevant times. Reporting on the verdict, Australian Associated Press noted that Cousins had by that point accumulated 22 convictions for breaches of restraining orders, 20 of which had resulted in prison sentences. He was released shortly after the expiry of the seven-month backdated term. No further convictions have been publicly reported as of April 2026.
