= White shift dress of Jean Shrimpton =

Minidress worn by Jean Shrimpton in 1965

- Ray Cranbourne's photo of Shrimpton in her shift dress
- Artist: Jean Shrimpton/Colin Rolfe
- Year: 1965
- Type: White shift dress

On 1965 Derby Day at Flemington Racecourse in Melbourne, Australia, English model Jean Shrimpton wore a white minidress that sparked controversy and was later described as a pivotal moment in women's fashion. The dress was made by Shrimpton's dressmaker, Colin Rolfe, and its hem was 4 in (10 cm) above the knee because he had not been supplied with enough fabric to complete their intended design.

== Background and design ==
In 1962, the Victoria Racing Club, faced with waning crowd attendance at racing events in the state of Victoria, Australia, added a "Fashions on the Field" competition to the program for the Melbourne Spring Racing Carnival races held at Flemington Racecourse. The competition was intended to woo female racegoers in particular.

Three years later, in 1965, textile manufacturer DuPont de Nemours International engaged Jean Shrimpton, then the world's highest-paid model, to travel to Australia to be a judge in the 1965 "Fashions on the Field". Her fee for the two-week visit was £2,000, equivalent to A$60,982 in 2022, corresponding with at least a year's wages for the average Australian man. By comparison, the Beatles had been paid only £1,500 for their tour of Australia in 1964.

During the four days of the 1965 Spring Carnival events at Flemington, namely Derby Day, Melbourne Cup Day, Oaks Day and Stakes Day, Shrimpton would be promoting Orlon, DuPont's new acrylic fabric. DuPont sent Shrimpton rolls of Orlon so that she, in conjunction with her London dressmaker, Colin Rolfe, could design a secret wardrobe for her visit.

It has been said that Shrimpton, more than any other model of the 1960s, can lay claim to having been the world's first supermodel. Her visit to Australia was highly anticipated and was regarded as bringing international glamour and prestige to the Spring Carnival, which was the social and fashion event of the year. It was expected that, when attending Derby Day, she would be wearing a beautiful hat and accessories, including gloves and stockings—which were de rigueur for the ultra-conservative Melbourne establishment.

The garment Shrimpton and Rolfe developed for Derby Day was a simple white shift dress. However, DuPont had not supplied enough fabric to complete the intended design, so at Shrimpton's suggestion, Rolfe improvised, by finishing the hemline 4 in (10 cm) above the knee. Shrimpton later claimed to have told Rolfe that "nobody's going to take any notice". She also later told The Australian Women's Weekly magazine "I always wear my day dresses above the knee."

== Derby Day ==
Derby Day was held on 30 October 1965. As Shrimpton later recalled in her memoirs:

The day of the races was a hot one, so I didn't bother to wear any stockings. My legs were still brown from the summer, and as the dress was short it was hardly formal. I had no hat or gloves with me, for the very good reason that I owned neither. I went downstairs cheerfully from my hotel room, all regardless of what was to come.

There was absolute silence in the members' lounge at Flemington when Shrimpton arrived, two hours late, accompanied by her boyfriend, Hollywood actor Terence Stamp. Her outfit contrasted starkly with the conservative attire of the other racegoers, and she was openly scorned by them, particularly as she was defying protocol by wearing no hat, stockings or gloves. As well as being the target of catcalls from men and jeers from women, she was surrounded by kneeling cameramen, all shooting upwards to make the dress look even shorter.

== Reception ==
Shrimpton's Derby Day outfit scandalised the nation, and caused a global sensation. In the following Monday's edition of The Sun News-Pictorial, a Melbourne tabloid newspaper, the Derby and its winner were bumped from the front page by the famous photo by Ray Cranbourne. Alongside that photo was an article about Shrimpton:

There she was, the world's highest-paid model, snubbing the iron-clad conventions at fashionable Flemington in a dress five inches above the knee, NO hat, NO gloves, and NO stockings!

— The Sun News-Pictorial (Melbourne, 1 November 1965)

Conservative Australia was shocked. Former Lady Mayoress of Melbourne Lady Margaret Nathan accused Shrimpton of being "a child", and even prominent Australian model and columnist Maggie Tabberer was critical. Radio stations and newspapers published editorials for and against the outfit, but Shrimpton defended it, reportedly saying at the time:

I don't see what was wrong with the way I looked. I wouldn't have dressed differently for a race meeting anywhere in the world.

The controversy quickly spread to Britain, where the press angrily defended Shrimpton, with comments such as:

Surrounded by sober draped silks and floral nylons, ghastly tulle hats and fur stoles, she was like a petunia in an onion patch.

— The Evening News (London, November 1965)

In contrast, Australian fashion designer Zara Holt (whose husband Harold Holt became prime minister in 1966) praised Shrimpton's look, although she stated it was difficult for older women to pull off, and shared her disdain for hats.

== Aftermath ==
1965 ABC news report on Derby Day

On Melbourne Cup Day, 2 November 1965, Shrimpton's attire conformed to accepted convention and pressure from her sponsors. She wore a three-piece grey suit with a straw hat, beige gloves and stockings, and a brown handbag. About her Derby Day outfit, she told reporters, "I feel Melbourne isn't ready for me yet. It seems years behind London."

Shrimpton's appearance at Derby Day 1965 has since been described as the pivotal moment of the introduction of the miniskirt to the international stage, although London designers such as Mary Quant had promoted it the year before. The media attention surrounding Shrimpton's Derby Day appearance has been said to be a defining moment in fashion at the races. Designers quickly imitated the dress; according to The Age in 1966, "Last year's controversial Miss Shrimpton would have passed unnoticed in the crowd this year. Anyone with hemlines below the knee looked very 'old hat'." Angela Menz, the 2011 fashion competition winner, stated that "By today's standards, Shrimpton's dress was actually quite long".

The Derby Day dress has also had broader impact. Ray Cranbourne's famous press photo and the event it portrayed have even been the focus of serious academic analysis, in both Australia and England. According to the Australian analysis, Shrimpton's Derby Day appearance was the moment when a global youth culture began to shape young Australians' sense of style. A reviewer of that analysis has claimed that all the young girls wanted to be like "the Shrimp": free, cool, and elegant.

In an interview published in 2009, Shrimpton was reported as accepting the blame for the Derby Day controversy. She had presumed simply that she was being asked to attend the races because of who she was rather than what she would wear. She had had no intention of upsetting the racing hierarchy but had just not been sent enough material for a longer dress.

== See also ==
- List of individual dresses
- Red Tarvydas dress of Rebecca Twigley
