= Geoff Christian Medal =

Australian rules football award

The medal features an image of sports broadcaster Geoff Christian, after whom it is named.

The Geoff Christian Medal, commonly referred to as the Christian Medal, is an Australian rules football award given to the best player in the Australian Football League (AFL) from one of the two teams based in Western Australia, the Fremantle Football Club and the West Coast Eagles. First awarded during the 1999 season, the award is named after and struck in honour of Geoff Christian (1934–1998), a sports writer and broadcaster who served as chief football writer for The West Australian between 1961 and 1988, before being posthumously inducted into the Australian Football Hall of Fame and the West Australian Football Hall of Fame in 2000 and 2004, respectively.

Votes for the medal are awarded by ABC Radio commentators on a 3–2–1 basis at the end of each match. The award has been won multiple times by eight players, Matthew Pavlich, Paul Hasleby, Nat Fyfe, Lachie Neale, Andrew Brayshaw and Caleb Serong of Fremantle, and Daniel Kerr and Matt Priddis of West Coast. Fyfe has won the medal five times, the only player to do so.

== List of winners ==
Votes tallies prior to 2002 are unknown.

Year	Name	Club	Votes
1999	Adrian Fletcher	Fremantle	–
2000	Troy Cook; Paul Hasleby	Fremantle; Fremantle	–
2001	Ben Cousins	West Coast	–
2002	Matthew Pavlich	Fremantle	22
2003	Peter Bell	Fremantle	28
2004	Paul Hasleby (2)	Fremantle	27
2005	Matthew Pavlich (2)	Fremantle	26
2006	Chris Judd	West Coast	18
2007	Daniel Kerr	West Coast	26
2008	Matthew Pavlich (3)	Fremantle	29
2009	Aaron Sandilands	Fremantle	25
2010	Beau Waters	West Coast	19
2011	Matt Priddis	West Coast	28
2012	Daniel Kerr (2)	West Coast	24
2013	Nat Fyfe	Fremantle	31
2014	Matt Priddis (2)	West Coast	38
2015	Nat Fyfe (2)	Fremantle	33
2016	Lachie Neale	Fremantle	38
2017	Nat Fyfe (3)	Fremantle	24
2018	Lachie Neale (2)	Fremantle	23
2019	Nat Fyfe (4)	Fremantle	26
2020	Nat Fyfe (5)	Fremantle	20
2021	Andrew Brayshaw	Fremantle	30
2022	Andrew Brayshaw (2)	Fremantle	–
2023	Caleb Serong	Fremantle	38
2024	Elliot Yeo	West Coast	32
2025	Caleb Serong (2)	Fremantle	–
2026	Harley Reid	West Coast	-
