= Red Tarvydas dress of Rebecca Twigley =

Dress worn by Australian model

- Artist: Ruth Tarvydas
- Year: 2004
- Type: Red Tarvydas dress

The red Tarvydas dress of Rebecca Twigley is a revealing dress worn by Australian model Rebecca Twigley (who assumed the married name Rebecca Judd in 2010) to the 2004 Brownlow Medal ceremony on 20 September 2004 at the Crown Casino and Entertainment Complex in Melbourne, Australia.

== Background and design ==
In the lead-up to the Brownlow Medal ceremony, Twigley and her now-husband Chris Judd had been dating in Perth, Western Australia, since the previous summer. Twigley was a model and university student. Chris Judd was a superstar player for Perth-based Australian rules football club the West Coast Eagles.

Reminiscing in 2025 about the ceremony, Twigley told The West Australian, "Perth girls are relaxed. They’re chill. They don’t take themselves too seriously . . . A big part of me and who I am is because of my upbringing there." When Twigley found out that she and Chris Judd would be attending the ceremony, she went to see Perth dress designer Ruth Tarvydas. As she explained to The West Australian in 2025:

"[Tarvydas] ... was making dresses ... prolifically in Perth at that time . . . All of her dresses were just sequins and sparkles and sexy cuts and beautiful colours. She was really the designer of the moment. Every girl in Perth wanted a Ruth Tarvydas dress."

Tarvydas produced a red version of a black dress Twigley had seen another girl wearing the previous weekend. Twigley loved the colour and took the dress to Melbourne, without thinking much more about it. The dress has been described as having a "... dramatic plunging neckline that exposed [Twigley's] lean physique and belly-button piercing." It was valued at A$2,000.

== Reception ==
Although Chris Judd won the Brownlow Medal at that ceremony, much of the media attention focused on Twigley's dress. Twigley received more hits on Australian news website news.com.au than did the crowning of Miss Universe 2004, Jennifer Hawkins, surpassing all previous records for a single news day. Australian Football League CEO Andrew Demetriou described Twigley as one of the 20 highlights of the 2004 AFL season.

Speaking about the dress soon after the ceremony, Twigley said: "I really didn't think it would grab that much attention, but I got hounded on the red carpet. Everyone wanted an interview and pictures." In her 2025 interview with The West Australian, she reminisced:

"When I walked down the red carpet, I could see all the east coast press, and their jaws just dropped on the ground ... Like, ‘Who is this girl and what is that amazing dress?’ Everyone was shocked . . . For Perth people it wasn’t a big deal but I guess people in Melbourne didn’t really dress like that."

In 2004, radio presenter Jon Faine criticised Twigley's choice of fashion, saying that: "A lot of effort has gone in this season by football codes... to try to stop footballers looking at women as objects as nothing other than sexual desire or bits of meat and flesh... It's kind of like they are undoing all the work that was done earlier in the season." Faine's colleague Virginia Trioli disagreed, saying that "They are powerful, individual, attractive, strong women who want to look nice."

== Aftermath ==
Twigley donated the dress to national children's charity TLC for Kids. It was auctioned off in October 2004, going for A$23,000. TLC later rejected the winning bid when it discovered the buyer had links to adult dating agency RedHotPie. In 2024, in an interview coinciding with the 20th anniversary of the medal ceremony, Chris Judd told Channel 7:

"... it turned out [the dress] was bought by a producer in the adult film industry ... and he was planning to make an adult film featuring the dress and featuring a lady wearing it and the film was going to be called The Downlow.

"I'm not sure who was going to play me ... probably Vin Diesel (of Fast & Furious fame)," he joked.

"The charity weren’t too rapt with that (using the dress in the film) and ended up ... getting the dress back ..."

The charity then offered the underbidders the dress, but later changed its mind because it could not guarantee media coverage for the purchaser. The dress was returned to Twigley, who donated it to Chris Judd's then football club, the West Coast Eagles.

Following Tarvydas's death in 2014, the by-then Rebecca Judd acknowledged the dress in her tribute to the designer on Twitter, saying "You changed my life with your red dress Ruth. RIP beautiful lady x". The dress was the final gown in the Tarvydas tribute show at the Perth Fashion Festival.

Even in the 2020s, the media still refers to the dress as "that dress". In an article entitled "Brownlow: The show stopping and jaw dropping fashion moments" and published in 2020, Jackie Epstein of the Herald Sun described the wearing of the "... barely there red dress that got the nation talking and kickstarted a career ..." as "... [p]erhaps the Brownlow’s most iconic moment." Epstein also claimed that by wearing the dress, "Rebecca Twigley who became Rebecca Judd etched her name into the world forever."

A different opinion was expressed by radio personality Bridget Hustwaite in an article in The Age in 2023. Hustwaite, who had recently begun a relationship with professional footballer Oscar McDonald, was lamenting the tendency of her acquaintances and colleagues, upon being told about the new "someone", to ask "Oh, so you're a WAG now?" After noting that the expression WAG, as an acronym for "wives and girlfriends" of footballers, had originated in England in the early to mid-2000s, she commented, "Locally, it was the reporting of Bec Judd’s 2004 Brownlow Medal dress that promoted WAG into the Australian vocabulary and was consequently embraced by trolls who used it to objectify women."

In mid-2024, the dress was put on display in the Atrium of the Crown complex, as part of celebrations marking the complex's 30th birthday.

Judd told a Crown Perth event in August 2025 that she divides her life into two parts: before the dress and after. She was 21 years old when she wore the dress, and 42 when she made that comment. According to PerthNow, she is not sure she would have had her "Marilyn Monroe moment" if her now husband had not won the Brownlow Medal the same evening:

I remember walking onto that red carpet at Crown [Melbourne], and it was first time I'd been to Melbourne with my boyfriend, and he ended up winning the Brownlow that night which also made it a big deal. I don't know if the red dress would have blown up so much if Chris hadn't won.

== See also ==
- List of individual dresses
- White shift dress of Jean Shrimpton
