= Geoff Christian =

Australian sports journalist (1934–1998)

Geoffrey Hugh "Geoff" Christian (13 October 1934 – 7 November 1998) was a leading Australian rules football writer and radio broadcaster covering the Australian Football League and West Australian Football League.

Geoff Christian began his career as a junior football writer by writing for The West Australian newspaper as a teenager in 1954. In 1961 he became Chief Football writer for the paper; a position he held for more than a quarter of a century. In the late eighties, he retired and concentrated on radio work. Christian was a member of ABC Radio’s Saturday Sportstalk program for 14 years prior to his death in November 1998. Following his death, two awards, the Geoff Christian Medal and the Geoff Christian Media Award, were inaugurated to honour Christian's contribution to football in Western Australia, with the former being awarded to the best player in the Australian Football League (AFL) from a Western Australia-based team throughout the season, and the latter being award to a journalist performing at a "consistently high standard throughout the year in either print, television, radio, or photography". Christian was posthumously inducted into the Australian Football Hall of Fame in 2000, and the West Australian Football Hall of Fame in 2004.
