= Nadia Bartel =

Australian model and fashion designer

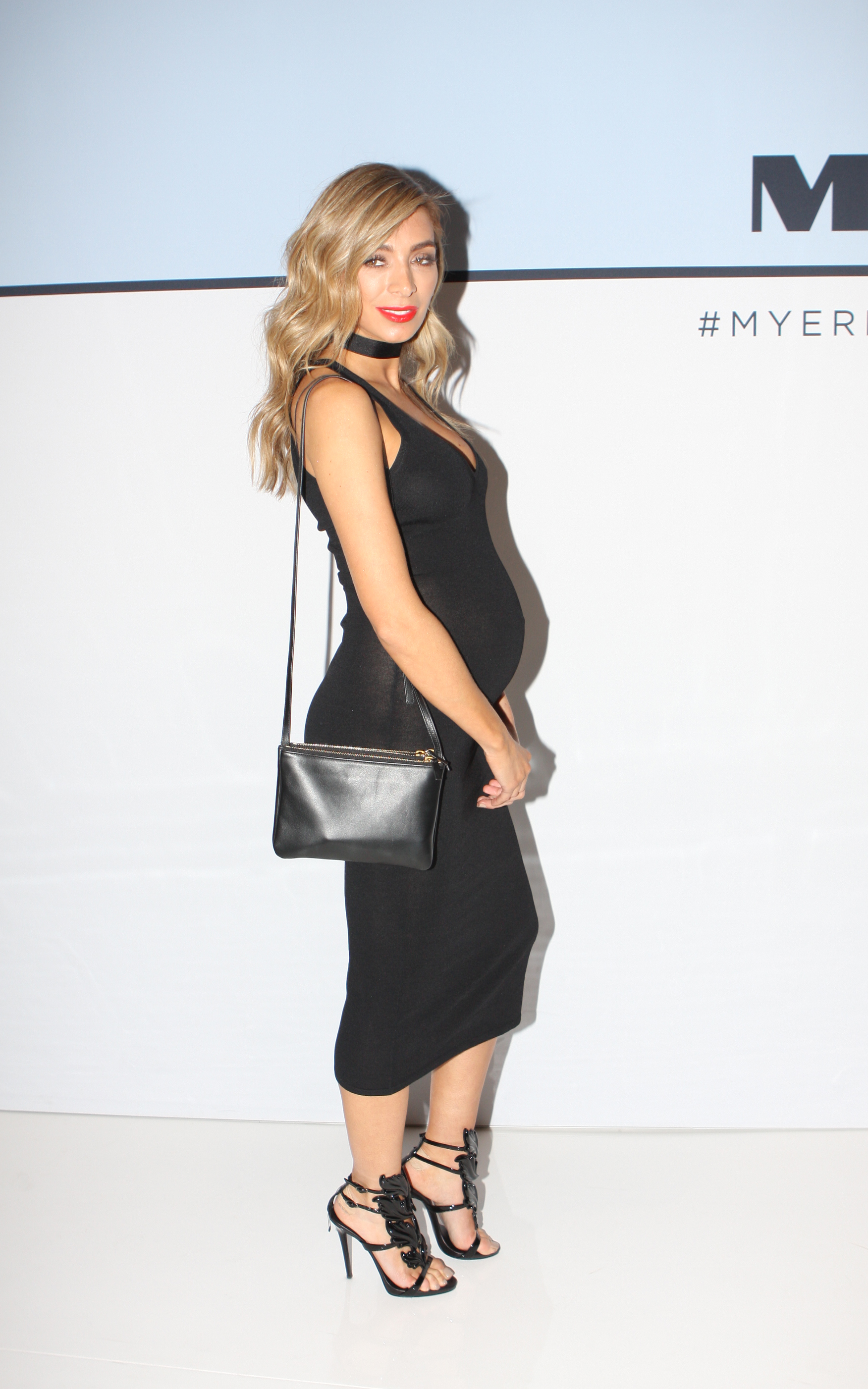
Bartel at the Myer Fashion Spring Launch Red Carpet in 2015

Nadia Bartel (née Coppolino, born 1985) is an Australian model and clothes designer. She is the former wife of retired AFL footballer Jimmy Bartel.

== Career ==
Bartel developed a clothing brand with her sister and another business partner. Inspired by minimalist Scandinavian style, it is called Henne, which means "her" in Swedish. In 2020, Bartel developed a line of tracksuits in earthy colours which became a fashion hit.

Since November 2023, Bartel has hosted Ticker Business Learnings on Ticker News.

== Personal life ==
She began dating Jimmy Bartel in 2008, and married him on the Bellarine Peninsula in 2014. The couple's first child was born in 2015, and a second son was born in 2018. The couple announced their separation in August 2019. Their divorce was finalised in August 2021.

In September 2021, a viral video circulated of Bartel snorting an unknown white powder off a Kmart plate at a gathering in her home during one of Melbourne's COVID lockdowns.
