= Ticker News =

Streaming news channel

- Headquarters: Melbourne, Australia

Ownership
- Owner: The Ticker Company

History
- Founded: 19 August 2019
- Founder: Ahron Young
- Former names: Ticker TV

Links
- Website: www.tickernews.co

Ticker News (stylised as ticker NEWS), also known simply as Ticker, is a streaming news channel based in Melbourne, Australia. The channel was founded by former Sky News Australia reporter Ahron Young.

== History ==
Ticker TV was founded as a business, finance and aviation channel by Young in August 2019. Young originally planned to have a subscriber-based funding model, but instead adopted a model that included branded content and sponsorships.

In February 2020, the channel moved to the Melbourne suburb of Richmond and launched a number of new programs.

In May 2021, it was announced that the Australian Department of Industry, Science, Energy and Resources would run a PR campaign through the channel over two months, featuring stories about businesses that benefited from AusIndustry funding.

Former Australian Football League player Chris Judd joined the channel in October 2022 to host a program called 'Talk Ya Book'.

In August 2023, Young claimed the channel had 3.2 million monthly viewers.
