= Chris Judd =

Australian rules footballer (born 1983)

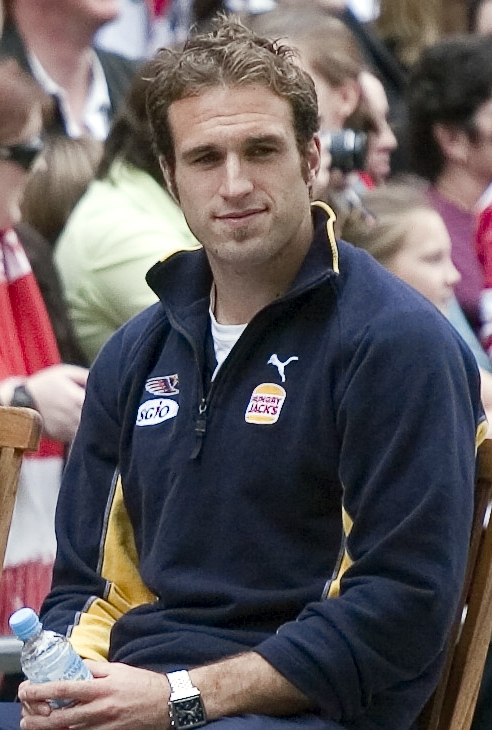
- Judd with West Coast in 2005

Personal information
- Full name: Christopher Dylan Judd
- Born: 8 September 1983 (age 43); Melbourne
- Original team: Sandringham Dragons (TAC Cup)/Caulfield Grammar (APS)
- Draft: No. 3, 2001 national draft
- Height: 189 cm (6 ft 2 in)
- Weight: 88 kg (194 lb)
- Position: Midfielder

Playing career^{1}
Years	Club	Games (Goals)
2002–2007	West Coast	134 (138)
2008–2015	Carlton	145(90)
Total		279 (228)

Representative team honours^{2}
Years	Team	Games (Goals)
2008	Victoria	1 (0)

International team honours^{2}
2002	Australia	2 (0)
- ^{1} Playing statistics correct to the end of 2015.^{2} Representative statistics correct as of 2002.

Career highlights
- AFL Premiership captain: (2006); 2× Brownlow Medal: (2004, 2010); Norm Smith Medal: (2005); West Coast Captain: (2006–2007); Carlton captain: (2008–2012); 2× Leigh Matthews Trophy: (2006, 2011); 6× All-Australian team: (2004, 2006, 2008, 2009, 2010, 2011); 2× West Coast Club Champion: (2004, 2006); 3× John Nicholls Medal: (2008, 2009, 2010); 3× Ross Glendinning Medal: (2005, 2005, 2006); AFL Rising Star: (nomination 2002); AFLPA Best First Year Player Award: (2002); Geoff Christian Medal: (2006); AFL Goal of the Year (2005); Madden Medal: (2015); AFL Life Member: (2015); West Coast Life Member (2018); Australian Football Hall of Fame inductee (2021)

Christopher Dylan Judd (born 8 September 1983) is a former professional Australian rules footballer and investment manager. He captained both the West Coast Eagles and Carlton Football Club in the Australian Football League (AFL) and is regarded as one of the greatest players of all time.

Widely regarded as one of the best footballers in the modern game, Judd twice won the league's highest individual honour, the Brownlow Medal, and was a dual Leigh Matthews Trophy winner as the AFL Players Association most valuable player. He was also a premiership captain, having captained the West Coast Eagles to the 2006 AFL Premiership. Consistently recognised as one of the game's premier midfielders, Judd was selected in the All-Australian team six times, including as captain in 2008. At a representative level, he played for Australia in the 2002 International Rules Series and for Victoria in the AFL Hall of Fame Tribute Match in 2008.

Judd is recognised as a great at two clubs: West Coast and Carlton. During his 134 games with West Coast, he captained the club for two seasons and won two Club Champion Awards. After returning to Melbourne to captain the Carlton Football Club, Judd won the John Nicholls Medal as the club's Best and Fairest three times, and became the fourth player in AFL history to win a Brownlow Medal at more than one club. In August 2021 Judd was elevated into the AFL Hall of Fame.

== Early life ==
Judd was born in Melbourne to Andrew Judd and Lisa Engel. He was raised in Melbourne's bayside suburbs, where he played for the East Sandringham Junior Football Club before he attended Caulfield Grammar School. Judd was an all-round sportsman and junior track and field star and solid cricket player. He won the APS U17 1500m representing Caulfield Grammar and the Ferret Track Club. At Caulfield Grammar, he began to focus on Australian rules football and later captained the school's First team. Judd attained an ENTER score of 96.20 on his Victorian Certificate of Education. He attended St Leonard's College throughout his primary school years.

Judd was a graduate of the 2000 AIS/AFL Academy and participated in the 2000 AFL Under 18 Championships, although due to his young age at 17, he was too young to be drafted by an AFL club. He played TAC Cup football with the Sandringham Dragons through to 2001.

At the 2001 AFL Under 18 Championships, Judd was named captain of the Vic Metro team, despite chronic shoulder problems. Although he missed the 2001 AFL Draft Camp, his performances at the state championships made him an obvious standout to recruiters and he was tipped to be picked high in the 2001 AFL draft. Judd was taken by West Coast with its priority draft pick (No. 3 overall) in what was later to be called the "super draft" due to the standout quality of the players to have developed from that draft year.

== AFL career ==
=== West Coast Eagles career (2002–2007) ===
Judd played only one WAFL match before making his debut for West Coast in round 2, 2002. He had an impressive debut season, winning the AFLPA Best First Year Player Award. In his second season, he alternated between the midfield and forward line and with several dominant performances he finished runner up in the club's best and fairest. He was appointed as one of the Eagles' four vice-captains prior to the commencement of the 2004 season.

==== Breakthrough season, Brownlow Medal and grand final loss (2004–2005) ====
2004 was Judd's breakthrough season in which he combined with captain Ben Cousins, midfielder Daniel Kerr and ruckman Dean Cox in the Eagles' midfield. Judd averaged 22 disposals, kicked 24 goals for the season, and became West Coast's first Brownlow medallist, polling 30 votes to finish seven ahead of runner-up Mark Ricciuto. Additionally, he was named to his first All-Australian team as a wingman, and won the Eagles' Club Champion award for the first time. In 2005, he again averaged 22 disposals and was runner-up to Cousins as Club Champion; he kicked the Goal of the Year and won the Norm Smith Medal in West Coast's four-point loss to Sydney in the 2005 AFL Grand Final.

==== Captain and grand final win (2006–2007) ====
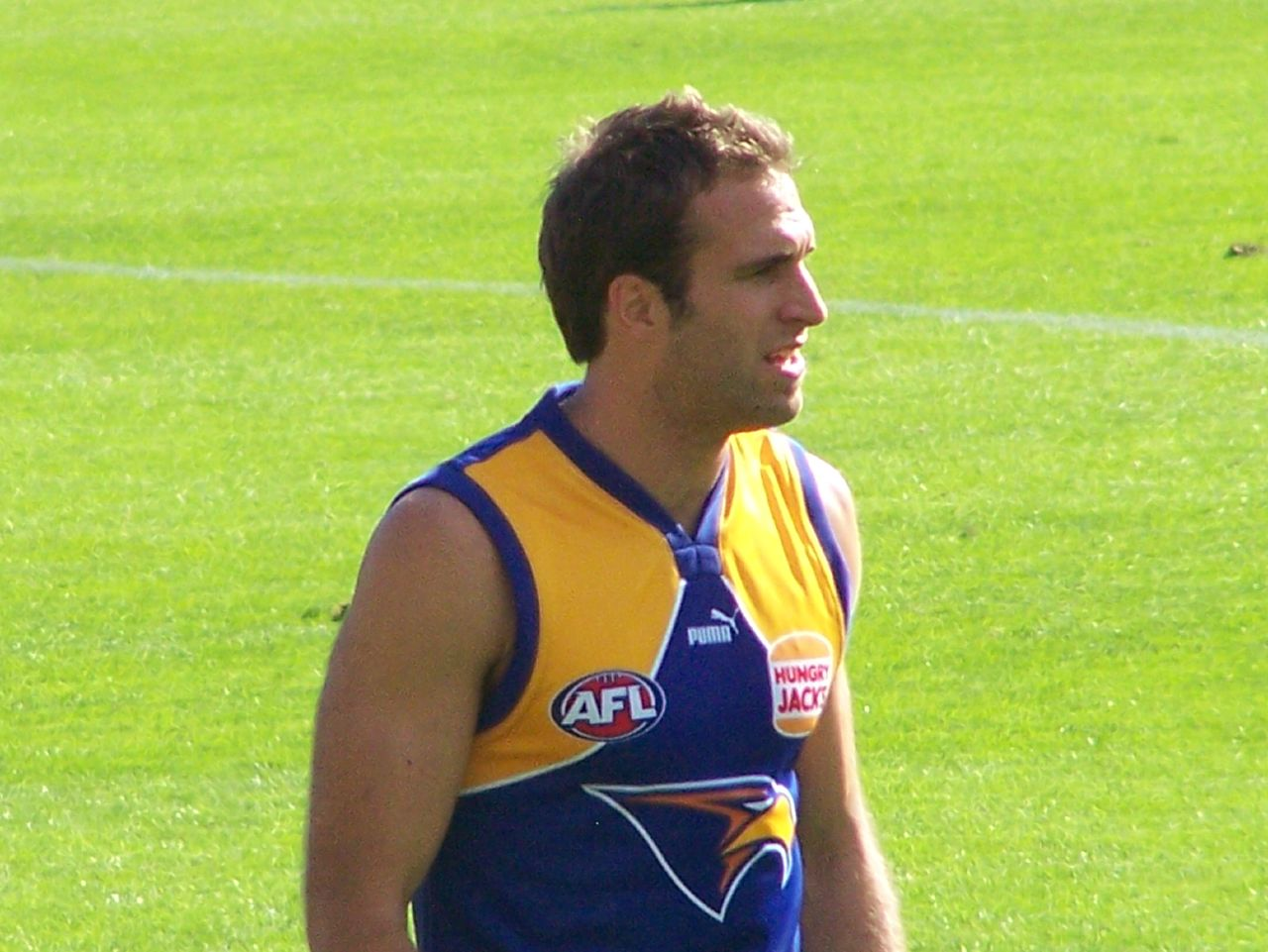
Judd on the field during the 2006 AFL Season

On 1 March 2006, Judd was named captain of the club, succeeding Ben Cousins who stepped down from the role for disciplinary reasons. He led the Eagles to a one-point victory against Sydney in the 2006 AFL Grand Final, winning his only AFL Premiership medallion. Additionally, he won his second club best and fairest award, his second All-Australian selection and the Leigh Matthews Trophy as the AFL Players Association's Most Valuable Player.

Judd's strong form continued into 2007 and he polled Brownlow votes in each of his first eight games for the season. However, as the year progressed, he was hampered by a chronic groin injury which sidelined him for several weeks and restricted his performance in the games he played. He was forced to play-off the bench and in the forward line often and was rested for several games in anticipation of playing in the finals series. He had won one premiership and was runner-up with the West Coast Eagles in 2005.

=== Departure from West Coast (2007) ===
On 16 September 2007, two days after West Coast's semi-final elimination by Collingwood, it was announced that Judd had left West Coast and would be requesting a trade to a club in Victoria. He notified West Coast coach John Worsfold and CEO Trevor Nisbett of his intentions earlier that day. His departure created much attention and speculation among the Melbourne-based clubs, the media and the football community.

In the weeks following the announcement of his departure, Judd met with four clubs: Essendon, Melbourne, Collingwood and Carlton. On 2 October 2007, Judd announced that his preferred club was Carlton, and Carlton was also considered most likely to secure a trade with West Coast, because the club held two early draft picks which could be used in negotiations. On 11 October 2007, Judd was officially traded to Carlton along with a third round selection in the 2007 AFL draft (No. 46 overall) for Carlton's first and second round selections (No. 3 and 20) and Josh Kennedy, who was reluctant to leave Carlton. Judd was subsequently given the No. 5 guernsey vacated by the trade of Kennedy, and he signed a six-year, $6,000,000 contract with the club.

=== Carlton career (2008–2015) ===
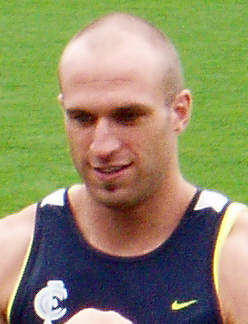
Chris Judd at Carlton training in 2008

==== Captain and second Brownlow Medal (2008–2010) ====
During the off-season, Judd was awarded the captaincy of the club entering into his first season with the Blues. His first game in navy blue was a Friday afternoon practice match on 7 March 2008 against the Western Bulldogs at MC Labour Park, with his presence attracting 12,000 fans, and he began his senior career with the club in the first round. His return match against West Coast at Subiaco Oval in round 7 was widely anticipated in the media, and Carlton won by 37 points. Judd played 21 of the 22 home-and-away games through the season was named All-Australian captain and ruck rover – his third All-Australian selection, and first as captain – and won the John Nicholls Medal for the best and fairest of the Carlton Football Club. He also represented the Victorian team the following week for the Hall of Fame Tribute Match. Judd again won the John Nicholls Medal and All-Australian selection in 2009.

Judd had a controversial end to his 2009 season. In Carlton's elimination final loss to Brisbane, Judd was cited by the Match Review Panel for misconduct against Michael Rischitelli, after Judd made unnecessary contact near Rischitelli's eyes. The media initially reported the case as eye-gouging, and Judd created a bigger controversy when he stated that his intention was not to eye-gouge, but to push a pressure point behind Rischitelli's ear. Judd later said that his comment was intended as dry humor, but it was misinterpreted as genuine and prompted condemnation from many sources, from sports commentators to martial arts experts. After contesting the charge and appealing the penalty at the AFL Tribunal, Judd was suspended for three weeks. In another deadpan statement after the hearing, he stated "I've since watched a couple of Steven Seagal movies and realised that pressure points are no laughing matter," but he also acknowledged his own "stupidity" in the controversy. Then, his leadership was called into question when the team misbehaved during an organised Christmas booze cruise, which saw suspensions to teammates Andrew Walker, Eddie Betts and Ryan Houlihan.

After missing the opening three rounds of the 2010 season due to the "pressure point" incident, Judd earned three Brownlow votes in each of his first five matches for the season, going on to win his second Brownlow Medal with 30 votes, four ahead of 2009 Brownlow Medallist Gary Ablett, Jr. He became the thirteenth VFL/AFL player to win the Brownlow more than once, the fourth VFL/AFL player to win the Brownlow at two different clubs (West Coast and Carlton), and the first VFL/AFL player to twice poll thirty or more votes in a season. Judd also won his fifth All-Australian selection, being named on the interchange bench, and his third consecutive John Nicholls Medal, becoming the only player other than Nicholls to win the Carlton best and fairest award three times in a row.

==== Return to finals and further awards (2011–2012) ====
In 2011, Judd led Carlton to its best season in a decade, helping the team finish 5th at the end of the season, and to record its first finals victory since 2001. He was awarded the Leigh Matthews Trophy for the second time in his career, as well as the AFLPA's Best Captain Award for the first time. He was named vice-captain and ruck-rover of the All-Australian team, his fourth consecutive selection. He had entered the Brownlow Medal count as an unbackable favourite, with Sportsbet electing to pay out early after round 20, but he ultimately finished fifth. He played his 200th AFL game during the season.

==== Final years ====
In 2012, Judd played his 100th match for Carlton as captain against Hawthorn in round 14. In round 16 against North Melbourne he was reported for misconduct in that he pulled opposition player Leigh Adams' arm up, causing the shoulder to dislocate, in a move known as a "chicken wing tackle". Judd denied that he intended to hurt Adams, but the tribunal found him guilty and suspended him for four matches. He finished third in the John Nicholls Medal for the 2012 season.

Following the 2012 season, Judd took on a smaller role in the team, electing to relinquish the captaincy and step down from the leadership group. After his original six-year contract ended at the end of 2013, he began signing single-year contracts in preparation for the end of his career. In round 10, 2015, he suffered an anterior cruciate ligament injury in his left knee and subsequently announced his retirement days later, bringing an end to his 279-game career.

== Playing style ==
At his peak, Judd was the best midfielder in the game and is widely regarded as one of the best players of the 2000s decade. The strengths and traits of Judd's playing style were different between his time at West Coast and his time at Carlton, and he has been widely lauded for his proficiency at both. At West Coast, while he was a strong ball-winner, it was as an outside midfielder and ball-user where he distinguished himself. He possessed a combination of explosive speed, acceleration, agility and core strength which few if any players in the league could match; these attributes gave him the ability to receive the ball in traffic, then break free from or weave around taggers and opponents, allowing him to take clearing kicks in open space which were damaging to opposition teams. By the time he had joined Carlton, he had lost much of his acceleration and agility owing to the groin injuries he suffered in 2007. He overcame this by converting his game style to predominantly inside ball-winning role. By virtue of his core strength and balance, he became one of the best in the league at receiving ruck tap-outs, and riding or shaking off tackles in packs and congestion to win clearing handpasses to Carlton's outside midfielders.

== Footballing recognition ==
Judd has been praised by AFL journalists and past players in addition to formal awards he has received.

I'm continually amazed the way he plays his game... You hear him interviewed and you think what an unbelievably together, mature, young guy he is. He's a fantastic guy to have.

— Leigh Matthews, VFL/AFL Player of the Century

He is the hardest opponent I've ever played on. I remember watching him when he first burst onto the scene, I actually would look at him as someone I wanted to base my game around. His speed, his accuracy with his skills, his contested football. It's just fantastic.

— Adam Goodes, Dual Brownlow Medallist

I played with magnificent players. Nicholls, Doull, Jesaulenko, but Judd is by far the best I've ever seen. He is just so consistently good, week after week – the way he's going he will win another Brownlow.

— Percy Jones, Four-time Carlton premiership player

It is almost super human, the way that he shrugs tackles and wins clearances and shimmies and shakes and sets up scoring opportunities and his consistency.

— Peter Bell, former Fremantle captain and North Melbourne premiership player,

== Statistics ==
Legend
G	Goals	K	Kicks	D	Disposals	T	Tackles
B	Behinds	H	Handballs	M	Marks

Season	Team	No.	Games	Totals							Averages (per game)						
Season	Team	No.	Games	G	B	K	H	D	M	T	G	B	K	H	D	M	T
2002	West Coast	3	22	21	12	222	109	331	48	63	1.0	0.5	10.1	5.0	15.0	2.2	2.9
2003	West Coast	3	23	29	15	268	150	418	52	74	1.3	0.7	11.7	6.5	18.2	2.3	3.2
2004	West Coast	3	23	24	15	330	171	501	51	89	1.0	0.7	14.3	7.4	21.8	2.2	3.9
2005	West Coast	3	24	15	24	336	200	536	77	79	0.6	1.0	14.0	8.3	22.3	3.2	3.3
2006	West Coast	3	23	29	20	332	263	595	61	112	1.3	0.9	14.4	11.4	25.9	2.7	4.9
2007	West Coast	3	19	20	14	240	197	437	37	60	1.1	0.7	12.6	10.4	23.0	1.9	3.2
2008	Carlton	5	21	15	9	250	258	508	41	81	0.7	0.4	11.9	12.3	24.2	2.0	3.9
2009	Carlton	5	23	12	19	319	290	609	54	102	0.5	0.8	13.9	12.6	26.5	2.3	4.4
2010	Carlton	5	20	14	11	291	248	539	61	105	0.7	0.6	14.6	12.4	27.0	3.1	5.3
2011	Carlton	5	24	14	16	301	332	633	69	148	0.6	0.7	12.5	13.8	26.4	2.9	6.2
2012	Carlton	5	17	13	9	209	217	426	55	62	0.8	0.5	12.3	12.8	25.1	3.2	3.6
2013	Carlton	5	20	11	12	236	217	453	48	68	0.6	0.6	11.8	10.9	22.7	2.4	3.4
2014	Carlton	5	12	7	4	141	105	246	44	41	0.6	0.3	11.8	8.8	20.5	3.7	3.4
2015	Carlton	5	8	4	2	76	72	148	20	21	0.5	0.3	9.5	9.0	18.5	2.5	2.6
Career			279	228	182	3551	2829	6380	718	1105	0.8	0.7	12.7	10.1	22.9	2.6	4.0

== Honours and achievements ==
**Brownlow Medal votes**
Season	Votes
2002	0
2003	12
**2004**	**30**
2005	15
2006	21
2007	16
2008	16
2009	22
**2010**	**30**
2011	23
2012	12
2013	5
2014	7
2015	1
**Total**	**210**
Key:
Green / **Bold** = Won

- Team
  - AFL Premiership (West Coast): 2006 (C)
  - McClelland Trophy (West Coast): 2006 (C)
- Individual
  - Brownlow Medal: 2004, 2010
  - Leigh Matthews Trophy (AFLPA MVP Award): 2006, 2011
  - All-Australian: 2004, 2006, 2008 (C), 2009 (VC), 2010, 2011 (VC)
  - Norm Smith Medal: 2005
  - Victorian Representative Honours in AFL Hall of Fame Tribute Match: 2008
  - Australian Representative Honours in International rules football: 2002
  - AFLPA Best Captain Award: 2011
  - AFLPA Best First Year Player Award: 2002
- Carlton
  - John Nicholls Medal: 2008, 2009, 2010
  - Carlton F.C. Captain: 2008–2012
- West Coast
  - West Coast Club Champion Award: 2004, 2006
  - Ross Glendinning Medal: 2005 (round 3), 2005 (round 20), 2006 (round 6)
  - West Coast Eagles Captain: 2006–2007
- Other achievements
  - Goal of the Year: 2005
  - The Age Player of the Year: 2009

In 2022, he was inducted into Sport Australia Hall of Fame.

== Post-Playing career ==
After retiring from the AFL in 2015, Judd began working as a private investor. He later founded the Cerutty Macro Fund, a long-only equities fund that focuses on macroeconomic and thematic investing for wholesale clients. Judd has described the fund's approach as macro-themed investing with an emphasis on capital preservation and alignment of investor incentives.

In October 2017, Judd joined the Board of Directors at the Carlton Football Club. At the end of the 2021 AFL season, Judd stepped down from the Board of Directors at the Carlton Football Club.

== Media appearances ==
Towards the end of 2003, Judd began writing a column on the West Coast Eagles official website called "Juddy's Jibe". Some of his opinions presented in these columns prompted extensive media commentary, such as his view that footballers should not be role models. Throughout the 2006 season, the column was also published in Melbourne newspaper The Age, in which Judd wrote about issues such as global warming, terrorism, superficiality in the mass media, world peace and James Surowiecki's book The Wisdom of Crowds.

In 2009, Judd was featured in the official advertisement for the AFL, receiving a mark from Aaron Davey on a basketball court and then sprinting in front of a stampede of horses on a horse racing track before handballing to Adam Goodes.

After doing some guest commentary in 2016, in November 2016 Judd joined radio station Triple M in a special comments role.

In 2019, Judd alongside Rich Lister Josh Liberman and other investors backed up Thinkmarkets, a London-based online brokerage company in its pre-IPO raising.

Judd joined streaming news channel Ticker News in October 2022 to host a program called 'Talk Ya Book'.

== Personal life ==
In 2002, Judd was studying for a Master of Business Administration degree and has previously completed university courses in media studies and corporate governance. He owned a Toyota Prius hybrid car and switched to "green power" at his former Perth house. He is currently an environmental ambassador for Visy.

On 31 December 2010, Judd married speech pathologist and model Rebecca Twigley. They have three sons and a daughter. On the night of Judd's 2004 Brownlow win, Twigley wore a revealing red dress which caused national comment.

== See also ==
- List of Caulfield Grammar School people
