= Bryan Cousins =

Australian rules footballer

Personal information
- Full name: Bryan Ernest Cousins
- Born: 29 December 1953 (age 72)
- Height: 175 cm (5 ft 9 in)
- Weight: 75 kg (165 lb)

Playing career^{1}
Years	Club	Games (Goals)
1970–1987	Perth	240 (309)
1975–1979	Geelong	67 (46)
Total		307 (355)
- ^{1} Playing statistics correct to the end of 1987.

Bryan Ernest Cousins (born 29 December 1953) is a former Australian rules footballer who played over 300 games in the Victorian Football League (VFL) and West Australian Football League (WAFL) competitions.

Cousins played as a rover and stood at 175 centimetres in height. After playing in the WAFL between 1970 and 1974 for the Perth Football Club, he was recruited to the VFL to play with Geelong where he made his debut in 1975. He went on to play 67 games for the club until 1979 when he returned to Perth. Cousins continued to play WAFL football until 1987. Cousins tied on votes for the 1983 Sandover Medal, but was beaten on a countback by John Ironmonger; in 1997, the WAFL awarded him a retrospective Sandover Medal. In his two stints at Perth, Cousins played 240 games and kicked 309 goals. He also represented Western Australia in State of Origin football.

Cousins is married to Stephanie and has four children, including former West Coast Eagles and Richmond player and Brownlow Medallist Ben Cousins (who was recruited by West Coast under the father–son rule). Cousins is also a successful harness racing trainer and Group One owner, winning the Chariots of Fire with Innocent Eyes.

In May 2026, Cousins revealed publicly that he had been diagnosed with Motor Neuron Disease, having been inspired to tell his story in the aftermath of the death of Neale Daniher earlier in the week.
