= Rebecca Judd =

Australian model (born 1983)

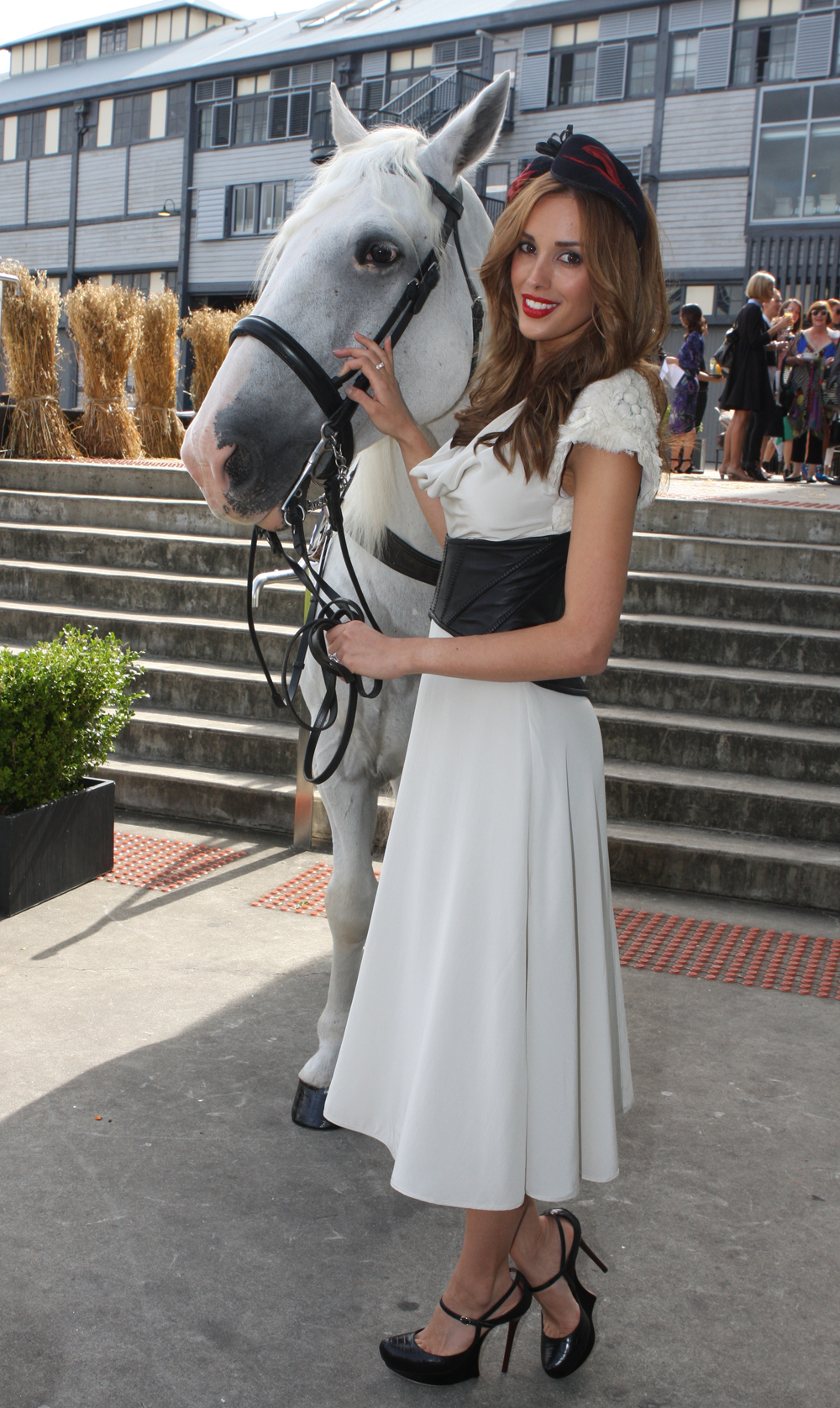
- Born: Rebecca Twigley; 27 January 1983 (age 43); Perth, Western Australia
- Education: Kent Street Senior High School; La Trobe University
- Occupations: model and TV presenter
- Years active: 2004–present
- Spouse: Chris Judd (m. 2010)
- Children: 4

Rebecca Judd (née Twigley, born 27 January 1983) is an Australian model, television presenter and the wife of former Australian Football League player Chris Judd. She has previously been host of Victorian-based travel program Postcards and was weekend weather presenter on Nine News Melbourne.

== Early life ==
Judd was born in Perth, Western Australia, to parents who had emigrated from New Zealand in the late 1970s to take up employment in the WA mining industry. Hugh Twigley, her father, is of Scottish and Irish ancestry, and Kerry Brown, her mother, has Māori heritage. At the time they relocated to Australia, they were aged 22 and just 16, respectively. Judd has a younger sister, Kate Twigley.

The Twigley family spent Judd's earliest years in a coastal town, Leeman, Western Australia. While living there, Judd's parents worked in the mining of mineral sands. At an event at Crown Perth in August 2025, Judd told the audience, "We would just ride our bikes around with no helmets, we'd leave for the whole day and come back late at night."

When Judd was five years old, she moved to Thornlie, a suburb of Perth. Her parents separated, and from then onwards she and her sister divided their time between Perth and regional WA. She attended Yale Primary School in the Perth suburb of Gosnells, and Kent Street Senior High School in Kensington, yet another suburb of Perth.

Judd's childhood was punctuated by "a lot of trips to New Zealand". During those trips, her family would gather with local relatives at her grandfather's large farm, and share food cooked in an underground oven according to the traditional Māori Hāngī method. However, the family was not wealthy, and at other times struggled to pay for such things as groceries, school uniforms, and school excursions.

At the Crown Perth event in 2025, Judd also said:

"I met my husband [Chris Judd] at [a Sunday afternoon drinking session at] The Cott [The Cottesloe Beach Hotel], as you do.

And the rest is history. He was in Joondanna at the time, and then I kind of nuzzled my way into that place."

In 2017, Chris Judd told broadcaster Mark Howard his side of the story. He had convinced teammate Daniel Kerr to accompany him to the hotel, to drink some beers. When his future wife caught his eye, "I saw someone who was incredibly attractive and pretty drunk, and that was my sweet spot!", he explained. Nothing "full on" happened that day, he continued, probably because at the time he was dating another girl. When that relationship ended, the future Mr and Mrs Judd got together. "Initially," Chris Judd admitted, "I was just thinking, 'This girl’s a belter, let's run with this.'"

== Career ==
In September 2004 (the following year), Judd received considerable media attention due to her wearing a revealing red Tarvydas dress to the Brownlow Medal presentation. The dress was custom-made by Perth designer Ruth Tarvydas and was valued at A$2000. Although Chris Judd, at that time her boyfriend, won the Brownlow Medal, much of the media attention focused on Judd's dress and WAG status.

After the Brownlow presentation, Judd received a number of offers from Australian television networks. Her first television role was as a guest presenter on Nine Perth program Just Add Water. Judd also presented a news report about Melbourne Cup fashion for Seven News in October 2006.

The next year, Judd started presenting the weekend weather for Seven News in Perth. Her presenting role drew criticism from some public, who complained that she looked anorexic. She spoke out against the claims, saying that she had never suffered from an eating disorder and she believed the fuss was due to her relationship with Chris Judd. Seven News director Shaun Menegola said it was a shame Judd had been attacked by some viewers and explained that her tall stature meant she looked thinner on camera.

In 2011, Judd joined the Nine Network as host of Victorian-based travel program Postcards and continued in the role until 2020.

In the second quarter of 2013, she filled in for Livinia Nixon presenting the weather on Nine Afternoon News and Nine News Melbourne whilst Nixon was on maternity leave with her second child.

The Judds purchased Jaggad activewear with Steven and Michelle Greene in 2013, transforming the brand from a triathlon brand to a stylish sports brand. In 2020, the brand was accused of copying designs by Australian brand Nagnata, of which Jaggad has denied.

Judd launched her fashion and lifestyle blog, Rebecca Judd Loves (RJL) in 2012.

In April 2014, Judd was appointed weekend weather presenter on Nine News Melbourne.

In May 2014, Judd designed a capsule fashion collection with Australian fashion brand Skin and Threads, and launched a webTV series called The Style School about home renovation and interior design.

Working on Nine News, Judd was put in an awkward position in 2016 when colleague Tony Jones tried to kiss Judd as a maternity leave farewell live on air. In November 2016, Judd resigned from Nine News Melbourne to spend more time with her family.

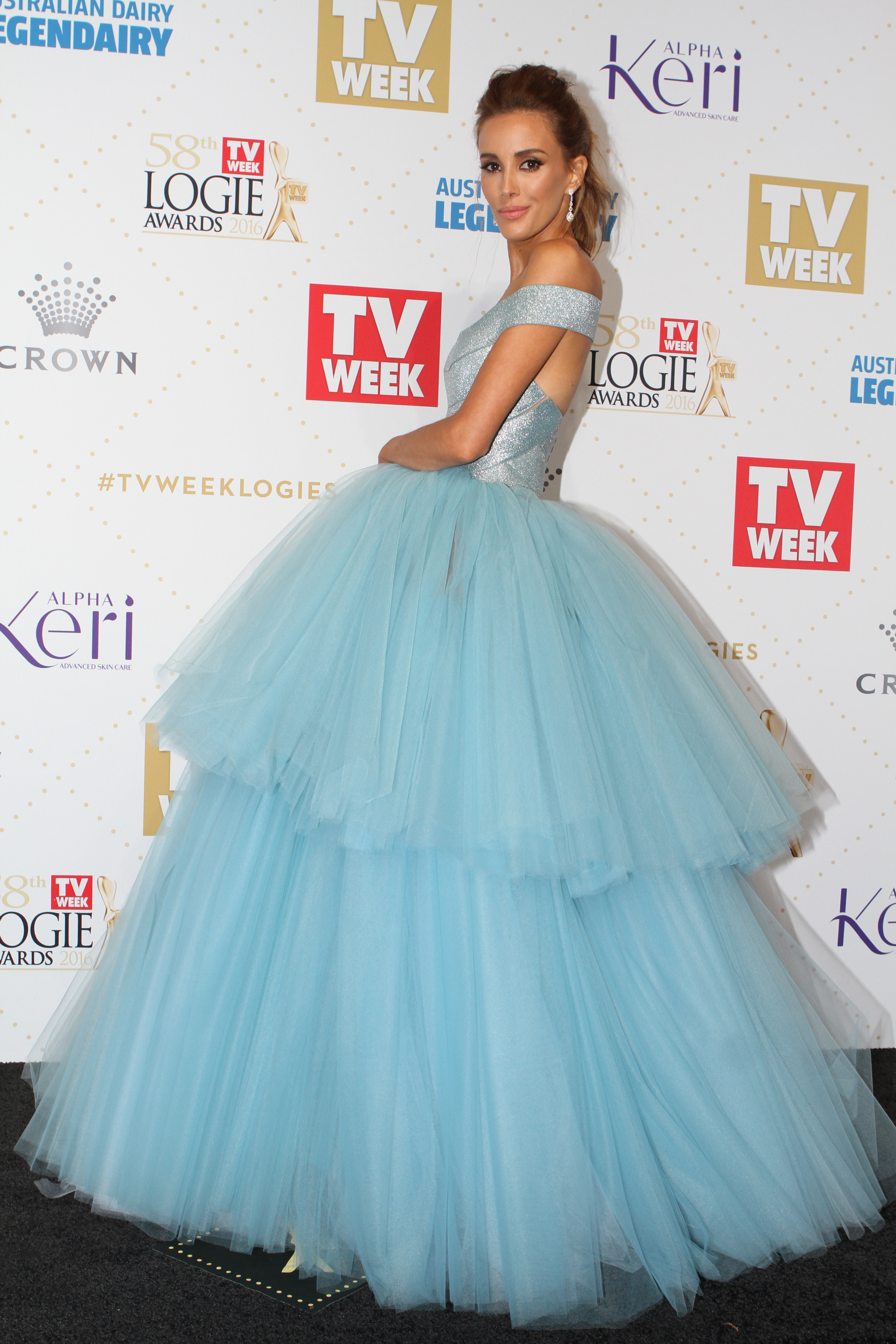
Rebecca Judd at the 58th Annual Logie Awards in 2016

In January 2017, Judd joined the KIIS Network to host the 3PM Pick-Up along with Katie "Monty" Dimond and Yumi Stynes.

In 2018 Judd released her first book called "The Baby Bible" about pregnancy and motherhood.

Judd created controversy during the 2020 Melbourne COVID-19 pandemic lockdown by wearing a "Free Melbourne" t-shirt on her Instagram and criticising Victorian Premier Dan Andrews for Melbourne's lockdown measures, calling him "Dictator Dan".

In November 2020, Judd announced she would not be returning to the 3pm Pick-up in 2021, citing she wanted to take a break from the media and focus on her four children and husband Chris Judd.

Judd is an ambassador for Myer and for brands such as Klorane, Chadstone The Fashion Capital, Adairs and The Skincare Company.

In 2023, Judd competed in the seventh season of The Amazing Race Australia with her sister, Kate Twigley.

== Personal life ==
In September 2007, Judd announced that she would be moving to Melbourne with then boyfriend Chris Judd. She completed her studies in speech and language pathology at La Trobe University in 2008 and worked in adult rehabilitation at the Alfred Hospital.

On 31 December 2010, Judd married Chris Judd at Melbourne's Carousel at Albert Park. They have a son, Oscar, born in 2011, a daughter, Billie, born in 2014, and twin boys, Tom and Darcy, born in 2016.

The Judd family lives in a $7.3 million Spanish Colonial house in Brighton.

Media offices
Preceded by Originator	Nine News Melbourne; Weekend weather presenter 2014 – 2016	Succeeded by Justine Conway
