= 2001 AFL draft =

Draft for the Australian Football League

The 2001 AFL draft consisted of a state draft, a body draft, a pre-season draft and a trade period. The AFL draft is the annual draft of players by Australian rules football teams that participate in the main competition of that sport, the Australian Football League (AFL).

In 2001 there were 83 picks to be drafted between 16 teams in the national draft. The Fremantle Dockers originally received the first pick in the national draft after finishing on the bottom of the ladder in the 2001 AFL season but they traded it to Hawthorn for Trent Croad. The No.1 draft pick was Luke Hodge, who became the first No.1 draft pick in many seasons to play in a premiership side.

The draft was known widely as the "superdraft" due to the recruitment of modern star players such as Luke Hodge, Luke Ball, Chris Judd, Jimmy Bartel, Nick Dal Santo, Steve Johnson, Sam Mitchell, Leigh Montagna, Gary Ablett, Brian Lake, Matthew Boyd, James Kelly, Dane Swan, Lewis Roberts-Thomson, Campbell Brown, and David Hale. All of the aforementioned players played in at least one Grand Final; all but Dal Santo and Montagna played in a premiership team; and Judd, Mitchell, and Hodge (three times) captained their respective teams to victories in the 2006, 2008, 2013, 2014 and 2015 grand finals. Furthermore, Judd (2004, 2010), Bartel (2007), Ablett (2009, 2013), Swan (2011) and Mitchell (2012) also won the Brownlow Medal, the award for the best and fairest player in a season, while Judd (2005), Johnson (2007), Hodge (2008 and 2014), Bartel (2011) and Lake (2013) all won a Norm Smith Medal, which is awarded to the best player on-field in the AFL Grand Final.

== Trades ==
In alphabetical order of new clubs

Player	Original club	New club	Traded for
Ryan Fitzgerald	Sydney Swans	Adelaide Crows	draft pick #28
Kris Massie	Carlton	Adelaide Crows	Andrew Eccles
Ben Nelson	Carlton	Adelaide Crows	David Gallagher
Daniel Schell	Fremantle	Adelaide Crows	draft pick #56
Andrew Eccles	Adelaide Crows	Carlton	Kris Massie
David Gallagher	Adelaide Crows	Carlton	Ben Nelson
Corey McKernan	Kangaroos	Carlton	Mark Porter and draft picks #14 & #30
Justin Murphy	Geelong	Carlton	draft pick #23
Lindsay Smith	Kangaroos	Carlton	draft pick #61
Trent Croad	Hawthorn	Fremantle	draft picks #1, #20 & #36
Jeff Farmer	Melbourne	Fremantle	draft pick #17
Luke McPharlin	Hawthorn	Fremantle	draft picks #1, #20 & #36
Troy Simmonds	Melbourne	Fremantle	Daniel Bandy (3-way trade with Western Bulldogs)
Brent Grgic	Melbourne	Geelong	draft pick #55
David Bourke	Richmond	Kangaroos	draft pick #68
Mark Porter	Carlton	Kangaroos	Corey McKernan and draft picks #23 & #39
Clint Bizzell	Geelong	Melbourne	draft picks #17 & #41
Craig Ellis	Western Bulldogs	Melbourne	Troy Simmonds (3-way trade with Fremantle)
Peter Vardy	Adelaide Crows	Melbourne	draft pick #56
Damien Hardwick	Essendon	Port Adelaide	draft picks #31 & 47
Paul Hudson	Western Bulldogs	Richmond	draft pick #49
Greg Stafford	Sydney Swans	Richmond	Nick Daffy and draft pick #17
Heath Black	Fremantle	St Kilda	draft pick #17
Trent Knobel	Brisbane Lions	St Kilda	draft pick #45
Nick Daffy	Richmond	Sydney Swans	Greg Stafford
Barry Hall	St Kilda	Sydney Swans	draft pick #13, #17 & #45
Daniel Bandy	Fremantle	Western Bulldogs	Craig Ellis & draft pick #26 (3-way trade with Melbourne)
Marcus Picken	Brisbane Lions	Western Bulldogs	draft pick #49
Shannon Rusca	Brisbane Lions	Western Bulldogs	draft pick #49

== 2001 national draft ==
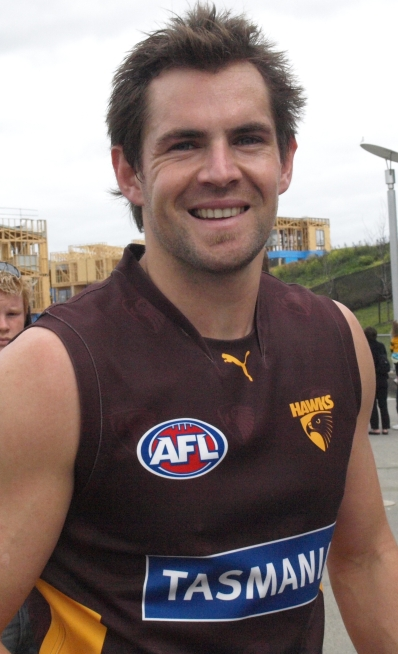
Luke Hodge, pick 1

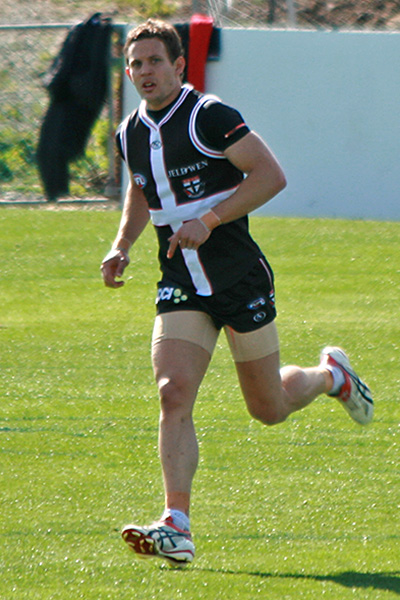
Luke Ball, pick 2

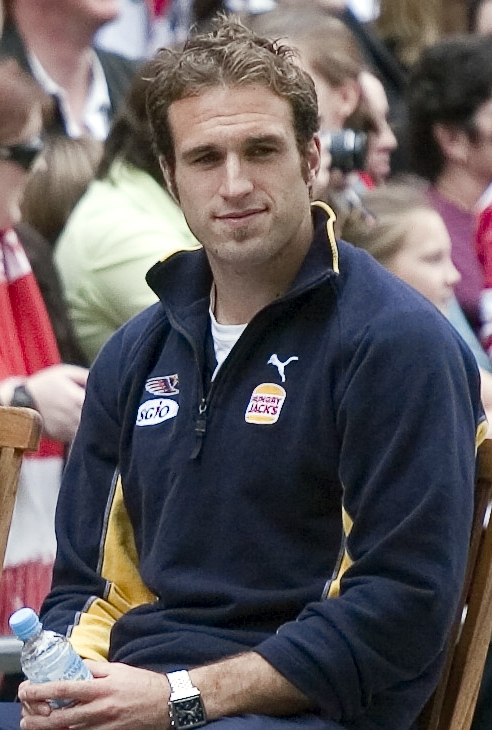
Chris Judd, pick 3

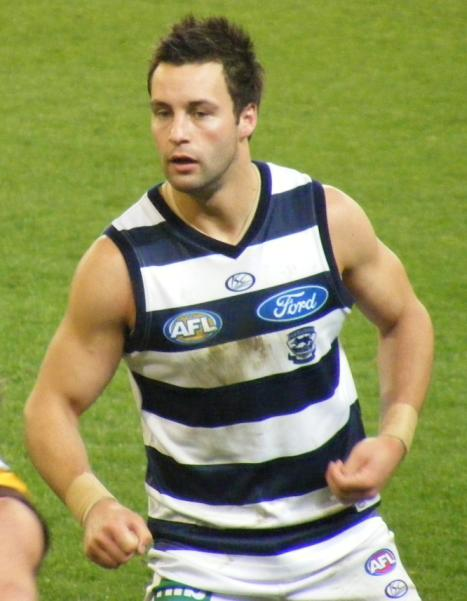
Jimmy Bartel, pick 8

*	Denotes player who has been a premiership player and been selected for at least one All-Australian team
^{+}	Denotes player who has been a premiership player at least once
^{x}	Denotes player who has been selected for at least one All-Australian team
^{~}	Denotes player who has been selected as Rising Star

Round	Pick	Player	Recruited from	Club
Priority	1	Luke Hodge	Geelong Falcons	Hawthorn
Priority	2	Luke Ball	Sandringham Dragons	St Kilda
Priority	3	Chris Judd	Sandringham Dragons	West Coast Eagles
1	4	Graham Polak	East Fremantle	Fremantle
1	5	Xavier Clarke	St Mary's	St Kilda
1	6	Ashley Sampi	South Fremantle	West Coast Eagles
1	7	David Hale	Broadbeach	Kangaroos
1	8	Jimmy Bartel	Geelong Falcons	Geelong
1	9	Luke Molan	Geelong Falcons	Melbourne
1	10	Sam Power	Oakleigh Chargers	Western Bulldogs
1	11	Richard Cole	Eastern Ranges	Collingwood
1	12	Brent Reilly	Calder Cannons	Adelaide
1	13	Nick Dal Santo	Bendigo Pioneers	St Kilda
1	14	Ashley Watson	Bendigo Pioneers	Kangaroos
1	15	Barry Brooks	Tassie Mariners	Port Adelaide
1	16	Rick Ladson	Bendigo Pioneers	Hawthorn
1	17	James Kelly	Calder Cannons	Geelong
1	18	Shane Harvey	Northern Knights	Essendon
1	19	Jason Gram	Gippsland Power	Brisbane Lions
2	20	Daniel Elstone	Bendigo Pioneers	Hawthorn
2	21	Matt Maguire	Geelong Falcons	St Kilda
2	22	Mark Seaby	West Perth	West Coast
2	23	Charlie Gardiner	Sandringham Dragons	Geelong
2	24	Steve Johnson	Murray Bushrangers	Geelong
2	25	Steven Armstrong	Perth	Melbourne
2	26	Aaron Rogers	NSW/ACT Rams	Melbourne
2	27	Tom Davidson	Geelong Falcons	Collingwood
2	28	Mark Powell	Murray Bushrangers	Sydney
2	29	Lewis Roberts-Thomson	NSW/ACT Rams	Sydney
2	30	Rod Crowe	Sandringham Dragons	Kangaroos
2	31	Joel Reynolds	Geelong Falcons	Essendon
2	32	Campbell Brown	Oakleigh Chargers	Hawthorn
2	33	David Rodan	Calder Cannons	Richmond
2	34	Simon O'Keefe	Murray Bushrangers	Essendon
2	35	Jarrad Wright	Woodville-West Torrens	Brisbane Lions
3	36	Sam Mitchell	Box Hill Hawks	Hawthorn
3	37	Leigh Montagna	Northern Knights	St Kilda
3	38	Ashley Hansen	Oakleigh Chargers	West Coast Eagles
3	39	Justin Davies	Murray Bushrangers	Carlton
3	40 (F/S)	Gary Ablett, Jr.	Geelong Falcons	Geelong
3	41	Henry Playfair	NSW/ACT Rams	Geelong
3	42	Kieran McGuinness	Eastern Ranges	Western Bulldogs
3	43	Mark McGough	Murray Bushrangers	Collingwood
3	44	Ben Finnin	Northern Knights	Adelaide
3	45	Nathan Clarke	Brisbane Lions	Brisbane Lions
3	46 (F/S)	Jarrad Waite	Murray Bushrangers	Carlton
3	47	Andrew Welsh	Calder Cannons	Essendon
3	48	Simon Cox	Western Bulldogs	Hawthorn
3	49	Josh Houlihan	Murray Bushrangers	St Kilda
3	50	Paul Salmon	Hawthorn	Essendon
3	51	Pass	-	Brisbane Lions
4	52	Andrew Browne	Claremont	Fremantle
4	53	Daniel Hunt	South Fremantle	Sydney
4	54	Ben Robbins	Brisbane Lions	Kangaroos
4	55	Brad Miller	Mt Gravatt	Melbourne
4	56	Paul Medhurst	Claremont	Fremantle
4	57	Brent Colbert	Northern Knights	Western Bulldogs
4	58	Dane Swan	Calder Cannons	Collingwood
4	59	Jacob Schuback	Gippsland Power	Adelaide
4	60	Adam Schneider	NSW/ACT Rams	Sydney
4	61	Mick Martyn	Kangaroos	Kangaroos
4	62	Damon White	Perth	Port Adelaide
4	63	Adam Houlihan	Geelong	Richmond
4	64	Daniel McAlister	Essendon	Essendon
4	65	Pass	-	Brisbane Lions
5	66	Pass	-	Fremantle
5	67	Pass	-	St Kilda
5	68	Chris Hyde	Richmond	Richmond
5	69	Matthew McCarthy	Old Xaverians	Geelong
5	70	Pass	-	Melbourne
5	71	Brian Lake (Note: Brian Lake was known as Brian Harris when drafted)	Woodville-West Torrens	Western Bulldogs
5	72	Tristen Walker	Claremont	Collingwood
5	73	Pass	-	Adelaide
5	74	Ricky Mott	South Fremantle	Sydney
5	75	Sam Cranage	Carlton	Carlton
5	76	Jared Poulton	Port Adelaide	Port Adelaide
5	77	Marty McGrath	South Fremantle	Richmond
5	78	Pass	-	Essendon
6	79	Pass	-	St Kilda
6	80	Hugh Foott	Bendigo Pioneers	Kangaroos
6	81	David Johnson	Essendon Rookies	Geelong
6	82	Pass	-	Melbourne
6	83	Aaron James	Richmond	Western Bulldogs
Source:AFL.com.au

== 2002 rookie draft ==
Round	Pick	Player	Recruited from	Club
1	1	Luke Webster	East Perth	Fremantle
1	2	Josh Dicketts	Murray U18	St Kilda
1	3	Brent Tuckey	Collingwood	West Coast
1	4	John Baird	Box Hill Hawks	Kangaroos
1	5	Andrew Carrazzo	Oakleigh U18	Geelong
1	6	Mark Jamar	North Adelaide	Melbourne
1	7	Nick Greenwood	Gippsland U18	Western Bulldogs
1	8	James Podsiadly	Essendon (VFL)	Collingwood
1	9	Paul Thomas	Central District	Adelaide
1	10	Scott McGlone	Bendigo U18	Sydney
1	11	Bret Thornton	Oakleigh U18	Carlton
1	12	Jordan Barham	Calder U18	Port Adelaide
1	13	Ben Kane	Eastern U18	Hawthorn
1	14	Kristian De Pasquale	Coburg Tigers	Richmond
1	15	Scott Howard	Calder U18	Essendon
1	16	Darren Bradshaw	Mount Gravatt	Brisbane Lions
2	17	Josh Head	South Fremantle	Fremantle
2	18	Ben Schwarze	Sandringham U18	St Kilda
2	19	Quinten Lynch	West Perth	West Coast
2	20	Stuart Cooper	Murray Kangaroos	Kangaroos
2	21	Will Slade	Oakleigh U18	Geelong
2	22	David Robbins	Springvale	Melbourne
2	23	Matthew Boyd	Frankston	Western Bulldogs
2	24	Justin Crow	Oakleigh U18	Collingwood
2	25	Nathan Bock	Woodville-West Torrens	Adelaide
2	26	Chris Obst	Hawthorn	Sydney
2	27	Ezra Bray	Geelong	Carlton
2	28	Jaxon Crabb	West Coast	Port Adelaide
2	29	Djaran Whyman	Bendigo U18	Hawthorn
2	30	Brad Miller	Western U18	Richmond
2	31	Adam Winter	Calder U18	Essendon
2	32	Pass	N/A	Brisbane Lions
3	33	Aaron Sandilands	East Fremantle	Fremantle
3	34	Chris Jones	Echuca	St Kilda
3	35	Clancy Rudeforth	Claremont	West Coast
3	36	Adam Chatfield	Carlton	Geelong
3	37	Ryan Ayres	Darwin	Melbourne
3	38	Pass	N/A	Western Bulldogs
3	39	Andrew Hill	Wangaratta Rovers	Collingwood
3	40	Ben Rutten	West Adelaide	Adelaide
3	41	Ricky O'Loughlin	Adelaide	Sydney
3	42	Jordan Doering	Carlton	Carlton
3	43	Mark McKenzie	Northern U18	Port Adelaide
3	44	Nick Stone	Collingwood	Hawthorn
3	45	Matt King	Dandenong U18	Richmond
3	46	Ken Hall	Essendon (VFL)	Essendon
3	47	Pass	N/A	Brisbane Lions
4	48	Pass	N/A	St Kilda
4	49	Nicholas Walsh	Cavan GAA (Gaelic football)	Melbourne
4	50	Mark Dubyna	Sandringham U18	Collingwood
4	51	Martin Mattner	Sturt	Adelaide
4	52	Pass	N/A	Sydney
4	53	Michael Davis	Essendon	Carlton
4	54	Nick Jackman	South Adelaide	Port Adelaide
4	55	Michael Georgiadis	Box Hill Hawks	Hawthorn
4	56	Simon Hart	Coburg Tigers	Richmond
4	57	Pass	N/A	Brisbane Lions
5	58	Leith Teakle	East Fremantle	Collingwood
5	59	Gerrard Bennett	Sydney	Sydney
5	60	Adam Matthews	Carlton	Carlton
Post-draft	61	Pass	N/A	Brisbane Lions
Post-draft	62	Tom Hill	Sydney Redbacks	Sydney
Post-draft	63	Pass	N/A	Brisbane Lions
Post-draft	64	Luke Jarjoura	NSW-ACT U18	Sydney
Post-draft	65	David Mapleston	Morningside	Brisbane Lions
Post-draft	66	Nick Raines	Southport	Brisbane Lions
Post-draft	67	Luke Weller	Northern Eagles	Brisbane Lions

== 2002 pre-season draft ==
Pick	Player	Recruited from	Club
1	Pass		St Kilda
2	Aaron Lord	Hawthorn	Geelong
3	Nathan Saunders	Werribee Football Club	Western Bulldogs
4	Scott Cummings	West Coast Eagles	Collingwood
5	Trent Hentschel	Woodville-West Torrens Football Club	Adelaide Crows
6	Tony Lockett	Sydney Swans	Sydney Swans
7	Pass		St Kilda
8	Pass		St Kilda

== Honours ==
Brownlow Medallists:

- Chris Judd: 2004 and 2010
- Jimmy Bartel: 2007
- Gary Ablett, Jr.: 2009 & 2013
- Dane Swan: 2011
- Sam Mitchell: 2012

Norm Smith Medallists:

- Chris Judd: 2005
- Steve Johnson: 2007
- Luke Hodge: 2008, 2014
- Jimmy Bartel: 2011
- Brian Lake 2013

Premierships:

- Lewis Roberts-Thomson: 2005, 2012
- Adam Schneider: 2005
- Chris Judd: 2006
- Mark Seaby: 2006
- Steven Armstrong: 2006
- Ashley Hansen: 2006
- Quinten Lynch: 2006
- Jimmy Bartel: 2007, 2009 and 2011
- Luke Hodge: 2008, 2013, 2014, 2015
- Rick Ladson: 2008
- Campbell Brown: 2008
- James Kelly: 2007, 2009 and 2011
- Gary Ablett, Jr.: 2007, 2009
- Steve Johnson: 2007, 2009 and 2011
- Dane Swan: 2010
- Luke Ball: 2010
- James Podsiadly, 2011
- Martin Mattner: 2012
- Sam Mitchell: 2008, 2013, 2014, 2015
- Brian Lake: 2013, 2014, 2015
- David Hale: 2013, 2014, 2015
- Matthew Boyd: 2016
