= Jimmy Bartel =

Australian rules footballer, born 1983

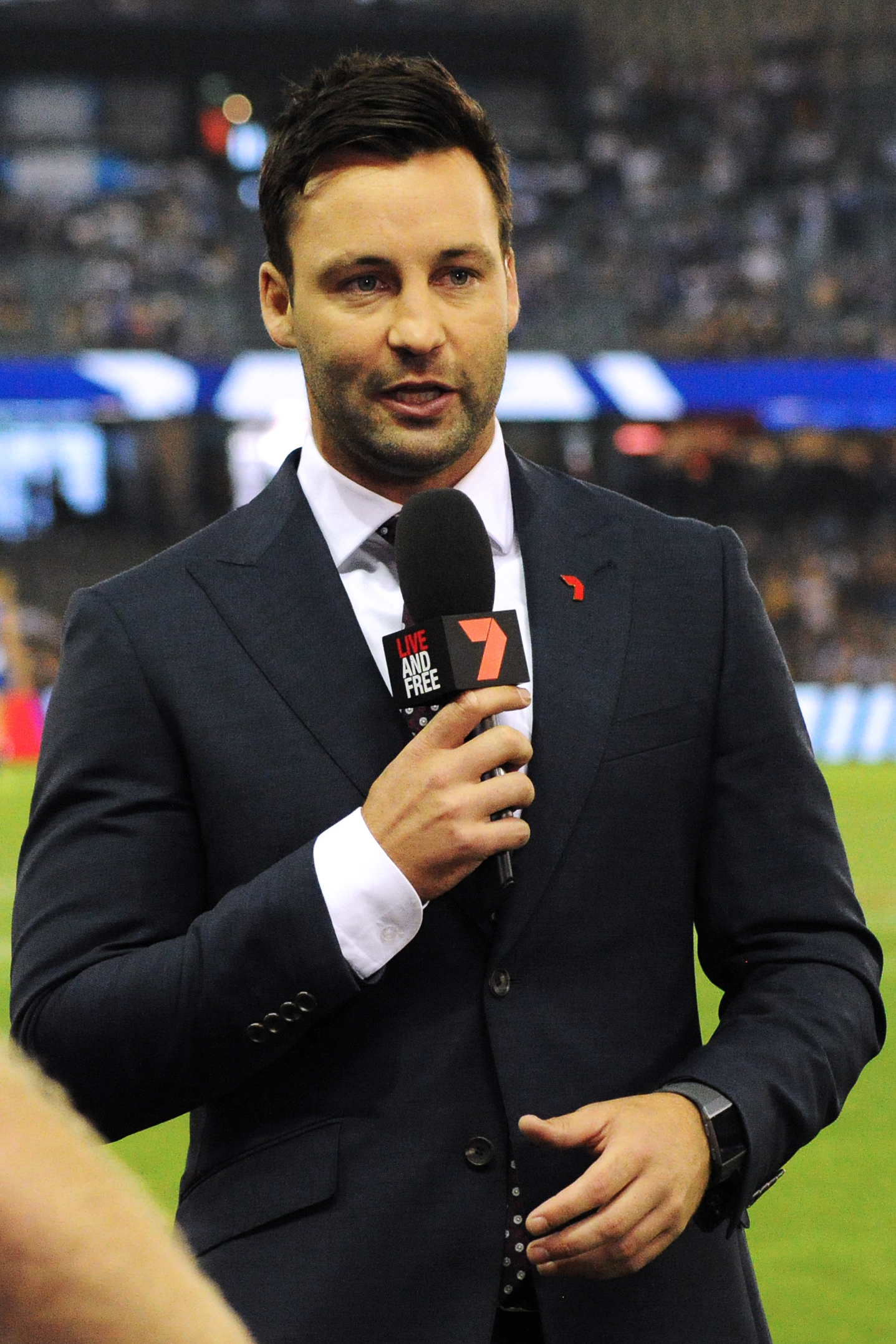
- Bartel in April 2018

Personal information
- Full name: James Ross Bartel
- Born: 4 December 1983 (age 42); Geelong, Victoria
- Original teams: Bell Park (GFL) Geelong Falcons (TAC Cup)
- Draft: 8th overall, 2001 National Draft
- Height: 187 cm (6 ft 2 in)
- Weight: 89 kg (196 lb)
- Position: Utility

Playing career^{1}
Years	Club	Games (Goals)
2002–2016	Geelong	305 (202)

Representative team honours^{2}
Years	Team	Games (Goals)
2008	Victoria	1 (0)
- ^{1} Playing statistics correct to the end of 2016.^{2} Representative statistics correct as of 2008.

Career highlights
- 3× AFL premiership player: 2007, 2009, 2011; Norm Smith Medal: 2011; Brownlow Medal: 2007; 2× All-Australian Team: 2007, 2008; VFL premiership player: 2002; Australian Football Hall of Fame: Inductee 2023

James Ross Bartel (born 4 December 1983) is a former Australian rules footballer who played for the Geelong Football Club in the Australian Football League (AFL). A utility, 1.87 m (6 ft 1 1/2 in) tall and weighing 89 kilograms (196 lb), Bartel contributed as a midfielder, forward, and defender.

Bartel made his AFL debut in 2002 and has garnered a long list of accolades and achievements. He is a triple premiership player, a Brownlow Medalist, Norm Smith Medalist, and a two-time All-Australian. Bartel is one of only three AFL players, along with Simon Black and Dustin Martin to have won a Brownlow Medal, a Norm Smith Medal and played over 300 AFL games.

== Early life ==
Bartel was born to Terry Bartel and Dianne Bennett in Geelong, Victoria. He spent much of his childhood in suburban Herne Hill without his father. When his parents divorced while he was just one year old, Bartel's mother was left to raise him and his two elder sisters, Olivia and Emma, by herself.

After beginning his junior football at the Bell Park Football Club, Bartel attended the renowned Geelong footballing school St. Joseph's College, where his talent for sports became evident. Bartel displayed initial promise as a cricketer, representing "Joeys" in 1st XI cricket as a 16-year-old, and winning the school's batting awards in both 2000 and 2001.

That led to his selection in the state under-17 team, before a switch in focus to football saw Bartel selected to play for the Geelong Falcons the TAC Cup competition. Although his age made him ineligible for the 2000 AFL draft, Bartel garnered an impressive array of accolades and honours as a under-age player. He won mid-year State honours for Victoria Country in the AFL Under 18 Championships, with his performances in the championship games earning him end-of-year All-Australian honours and the Most Valuable Player award for Victoria Country. In addition, he was named in the TAC Cup Team of the Year, won a TAC Cup premiership medallion with the Geelong Falcons, and also claimed the best and fairest award while still only 16 years of age.

Entering his second year with the Falcons, Bartel was rewarded with the team captaincy for the season. Bartel again won mid-year state honours for Victoria Country and was additionally awarded the state captaincy. Although failing to repeat his previous success as national champion with Victoria Country, Bartel's individual performances saw him earn All-Australian honours and gain selection in the TAC Cup Team of the Year for the second consecutive season.

== AFL career ==
=== Early career (2002–2006) ===
The Geelong Football Club drafted Bartel with their first selection and the eighth overall draft pick in the 2001 AFL draft. After making his debut in the opening round of the 2002 AFL premiership season, which was a heavy defeat to Essendon, Bartel went on to play in 11 out of a possible 22 senior games over the year. After gathering 21 disposals in round 4, Bartel was awarded an AFL Rising Star nomination. Having been dropped back to the club's VFL team to play out the second half of the season, Bartel played a key part in helping a young Geelong reserves side capture the 2002 VFL Premiership. In helping the Cats defeat Port Melbourne by 22 points, Bartel saw the club secure its first major piece of silverware since 1982.

Despite an impressive debut season, Bartel struggled to maintain his spot within the team during the 2003 AFL season, featuring in only 13 senior games. Averaging just 12 disposals a game, Bartel was unable to help the Cats qualify for the finals series for the third successive season. After just two senior appearances to begin the 2004 AFL season, Bartel was again dropped back to the VFL and instructed by coaching staff to work on particular aspects of his game. Despite compiling a series of impressive games in the VFL, Bartel was deliberately made to work hard over a two-month period before earning a round 10 recall into the senior side. Bartel's re-introduction to the senior team coincided with Geelong winning ten out of their final twelve games and securing a top four spot ahead of the finals series. Although Geelong were eliminated in the preliminary final by reigning premiers Brisbane, Bartel's averages of 22 disposals and 5 tackles a game over the course of the season had seen him secure his position within the team's midfield rotation. His performances during the second half of the season, during which he averaged 29 disposals and 5 tackles a game, also saw him recognised as the highest-polling Geelong player—with 13 votes in total—during the 2004 Brownlow Medal count.

Bartel continued to build on his reputation as a tough, courageous midfielder during the 2005 AFL season, earning his first nomination for the AFLPA Robert Rose Award for Most Courageous Player in the league. Averaging 19.6 disposals a game, Bartel again helped Geelong qualify for the season-ending finals series, where they met Sydney in the semi-finals. After developing a slim lead for much of the game, Geelong struggled to maintain their advantage during the final minutes of the match. Bartel was restricted to just 9 disposals as the Swans eventually won through to the preliminary finals, defeating Geelong by 3 points.

=== Geelong dynasty, Brownlow Medal and Norm Smith Medal (2007–2011) ===
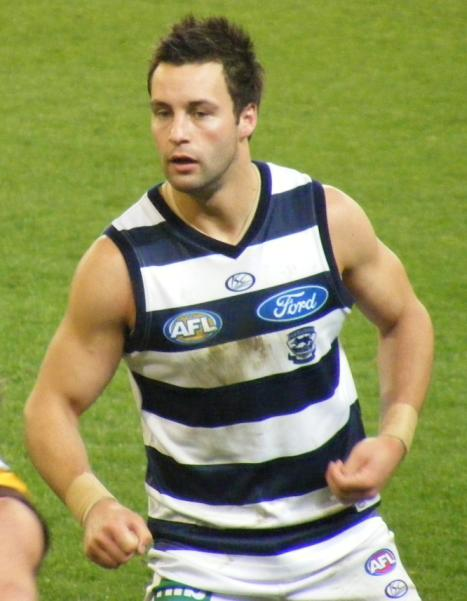
Bartel playing for Geelong in September 2008

During the 2007 season, Bartel established himself as one of the premier ball-winning midfielders in the competition, averaging over 27 disposals per game—the second-highest possession average in the league—and finishing amongst the top 10 within the league for total disposals (632), total handballs (291), total tackles (122), and tackles per game (5.3). After helping the Cats claim the McClelland Trophy, he was again nominated for the AFLPA Robert Rose Award as the game's most courageous player, and was also rewarded with his first All-Australian jumper.

Bartel's standout season continued when he was awarded the prestigious Brownlow Medal, winning with 29 votes—the highest number of votes ever by a Geelong medalist, and the third highest ever by any player under the current polling system—in a season that included eight best on ground performances. Despite missing the final two games of the regular season due to a burst appendix, Bartel also set an AFL record alongside teammate Gary Ablett, Jr., for polling the most combined votes ever by two players of the same club. In addition, the pair combined with teammate Joel Corey to set another AFL record for most votes ever polled by three players of the same club, at 61 votes. He capped off a fine season by winning his first premiership medallion when he helped Geelong claim the 2007 AFL Premiership. Bartel's 28 disposals, 5 marks, 5 tackles, and 2 goals in the 2007 AFL Grand Final helped the Cats claim an AFL-record 119-point victory over Port Adelaide.

Another outstanding season for Bartel in 2008 saw him earn All-Australian honours for the second straight season. Bartel had 20 or more possessions in the 24 of 25 games that he played which included 3 finals, Bartel also had his best career game for possessions during the season, in round 14 when he picked up 41 possessions against Adelaide Bartel would finish the season second in disposals with 702, also finishing second in kicks with 382. Geelong would have another dominant season finishing first on the ladder four wins ahead of second they would once again make the Grand Final, but would fall short losing to Hawthorn by 26 points. Bartel also took part in the special one-off event that pitted the interstate stars of the league against the Victoria stars of the league it was Victoria vs. Dream Team the AFL created the one-off event to celebrate the 150th anniversary of Australian rules football. Bartel picked up 19 possessions as the Victoria team won by 17 points.

Bartel played his 150th game in 2009, round 18 against Adelaide this game also marked his 100th win as a player, Bartel also equaled his career high for disposals when he had 41 possessions against Melbourne in round 6. In round 17, Geelong was facing Hawthorn, and the game was tied 98–98. Bartel would take a mark just as the siren sounded; he would go on to kick a point, resulting in Geelong winning by one point, 99–98. Geelong would finish the season second on the ladder two wins behind first. Bartel was outstanding in the Preliminary final against Collingwood, he picked up 32 possessions and helped Geelong defeat Collingwood to make their third straight Grand Final. Bartel would have spectacular defensive game in the Grand Final with 16 tackles which are equal highest in AFL history and a Grand Final record. Geelong would go on to win the Grand Final by 12 points this being Bartel's second premiership.

Bartel had another strong season in 2010, picking up 630 possessions at the end of the season for the fourth year straight and laying 110 tackles for the fourth consecutive year. Once again Geelong would finish second on the ladder one win behind Collingwood. Bartel averaged 32 possessions during the three finals that Geelong played. Geelong was eliminated in the preliminary final when they lost by 41 points to Collingwood.

In 2011 Bartel played his 200th game in round 21 against Adelaide, also kicked a career-high 26 goals in the season from only 32 shots and once again had over 500 possessions in the season. Geelong would once again finish second, one win behind Collingwood. Geelong would make the Grand Final and beat Collingwood by 38 points. Bartel had a spectacular performance picking up 26 possessions and kicking three goals; this resulted in Bartel being the best player on the ground and winning the Norm Smith Medal award and also his Third Premiership.

=== Changing roles, injuries and continued individual success (2012–2015) ===
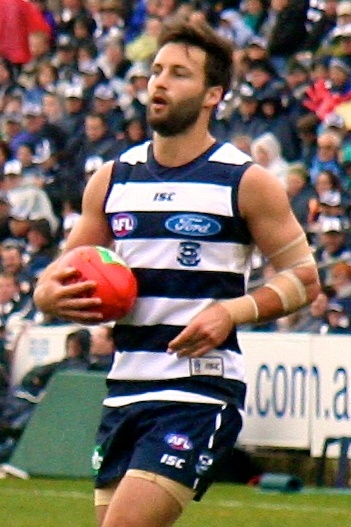
Bartel in round 19 of the 2011 AFL season

Bartel played most of the 2012 AFL Season with a stress fracture in his foot, despite this, he still had 20+ possessions in most of those games, which helped him produce his eighth straight 400+ possession season. Geelong finished sixth on the ladder which resulted in them playing an elimination final against seventh placed Fremantle. Despite 26 possessions from Bartel, Geelong lost by 16 points.

In 2013 Bartel would put together another solid season even though he moved from his usual Forward/Midfield role into the backline, specifically across half back. Bartel would gather 558 possessions for the season, the fifth time he has had over 550 in a season; his best possession game was in a win over the Brisbane Lions in round 23 when he had 35 possessions. Geelong would finish second on the ladder one win behind Hawthorn. Bartel played all 24 games of the season including three finals; Geelong would be eliminated in preliminary final losing to Hawthorn by 5 points, and Bartel Became Geelong's finals games record holder, having now played in 24 finals matches.

Bartel started the 2014 AFL Season by playing his 250th game in round 1 with a win over Adelaide Bartel would have 21 possessions and a career-best four goals in the game. Bartel would continue his goal kicking throughout the season as he kicked a goal in 18 of the 23 games he played in, resulting in a career-best 27 goals for the season and also being Geelong's second leading goal kicker for the season. Geelong would finish third on the ladder on the same wins and losses as second and first but were behind in percentage. Bartel would play in both finals as Geelong were eliminated in the semifinals losing by 6 points to North Melbourne.

Bartel would only play 11 out of 23 games in the 2015 AFL Season, due to an injury sustained in round 3 against Gold Coast. Bartel went off in the first quarter and was later revealed to have a torn medial ligament in his left knee; Bartel was sidelined for three months this is the first time in Bartel's career that he had been sidelined by a serious injury. Bartel returned in round 15 having a career best game picking up 41 possessions in a heavy defeat to North Melbourne. Bartel would go on to play the final eight games of the season. Owing to the injury, Bartel's tackle count and disposal count was at an all-time low at the end of the season with only 43 tackles and 259 disposals. Geelong finished tenth and missed the finals.

=== Veteran status and retirement (2016) ===
In the off-season, Geelong began revamping their team, as many of their veterans were over 30, and a new wave of younger talent was coming in; Bartel was 31 years old, and the six players out of contract were Corey Enright, Andrew Mackie, Jimmy Bartel, Steve Johnson, Matthew Stokes and James Kelly. Five of these players played in Geelong's four grand final appearances, including the three premiership victories. Stokes was the only one who didn't play in all four, as he missed the 2009 Grand Final. Geelong decided to delist Steve Johnson, James Kelly, and Matthew Stokes while limiting Corey Enright, Andrew Mackie and Jimmy Bartel all to 1-year contract extensions.

In round 19, 2016, Bartel played his 300th game, picking up 25 possessions and kicking one goal in a 25-point win over the Western Bulldogs. At the conclusion of the season, he announced his retirement from the AFL. In December 2018, Bartel joined the board of directors of the GWS Giants.

Outside of his playing career, he was honoured for his community work with the Jim Stynes Community Leadership Award, which was given based on his dedication to the Just Think Program, the ‘Face up to DV’ campaign, which he initiated in early 2016 based on his own personal experience, and his role as an ambassador for Cottage by the Sea. The award came with a $20,000 prize to be distributed to a charity of his choice.

== Statistics ==
Legend
G	Goals	K	Kicks	D	Disposals	T	Tackles
B	Behinds	H	Handballs	M	Marks

Led the league for the season only

Season	Team	No.	Games	Totals							Averages (per game)						
Season	Team	No.	Games	G	B	K	H	D	M	T	G	B	K	H	D	M	T
2002	Geelong	3	11	3	2	71	69	140	29	26	0.3	0.2	6.5	6.3	12.7	2.6	2.4
2003	Geelong	3	13	5	2	71	86	157	37	31	0.4	0.2	5.5	6.6	12.1	2.8	2.4
2004	Geelong	3	16	3	8	222	126	348	90	78	0.2	0.5	13.9	7.9	21.8	5.6	4.9
2005	Geelong	3	24	18	5	274	196	470	131	94	0.8	0.2	11.4	8.2	19.6	5.5	3.9
2006	Geelong	3	21	15	12	297	187	484	139	79	0.7	0.6	14.1	8.9	23.0	6.6	3.8
2007	Geelong	3	23	18	8	341	291	632	143	122	0.8	0.3	14.8	12.7	27.5	6.2	5.3
2008	Geelong	3	25	22	15	382	320	702	142	124	0.9	0.6	15.3	12.8	28.1	5.7	5.0
2009	Geelong	3	24	12	15	347	300	647	152	128	0.5	0.6	14.5	12.5	27.0	6.3	5.3
2010	Geelong	3	24	14	11	343	287	630	138	110	0.6	0.5	14.3	12.0	26.3	5.8	4.6
2011	Geelong	3	24	26	6	325	204	529	142	94	1.1	0.3	13.5	8.5	22.0	5.9	3.9
2012	Geelong	3	20	12	10	230	190	420	101	121	0.6	0.5	11.5	9.5	21.0	5.1	6.1
2013	Geelong	3	24	16	9	354	204	558	129	84	0.7	0.4	14.8	8.5	23.3	5.4	3.5
2014	Geelong	3	23	27	18	321	183	504	125	100	1.2	0.8	14.0	8.0	21.9	5.4	4.3
2015	Geelong	3	11	0	1	127	132	259	69	43	0.0	0.1	11.5	12.0	23.5	6.3	3.9
2016	Geelong	3	22	11	8	261	215	476	111	82	0.5	0.4	11.9	9.8	21.6	5.0	3.7
Career			305	202	130	3966	2990	6956	1678	1316	0.7	0.4	13.0	9.8	22.8	5.5	4.3

== Honours ==
**Brownlow Medal votes**
Season	Votes
2002	3
2003	0
2004	13
2005	9
2006	2
**2007**	**29**
2008	10
2009	13
2010	9
2011	8
**Total**	**96**
Key:
Green / **Bold** = Won

- **Team**
  - **AFL Premiership (Geelong)** : 2007, 2009, 2011
  - McClelland Trophy (Geelong): 2007, 2008
  - NAB Cup (Geelong): 2006, 2009
  - VFL Premiership (Geelong): 2002
- **Individual**
  - Brownlow Medal: 2007
  - All-Australian: 2007, 2008
  - Norm Smith Medal: 2011
  - Victorian Team representative honours in AFL Hall of Fame Tribute Match: 2008
  - Geelong Advertiser Bendigo Bank Sports Star of the Year Award: 2007
  - Sports Performer of the Year Award: 2007
  - TCM AFL Performers of the Year Award: 2007
- **Other achievements**
  - Geelong F.C. Vice-Captain: 2012-13
  - Inducted into the Geelong Football Club Hall of Fame: 2009
  - Second in Carji Greeves Medal: 2006, 2007
  - Third in AFLPA Robert Rose Award for Most Courageous Player: 2007
  - Most Geelong votes in the Brownlow Medal: 2004, 2007
- **TAC Cup**
  - All Australian U/18 (2000, 2001)
  - TAC Cup Team of the Year (2000, 2001)
  - TAC Cup Premiership (2000)
  - Vic Country Most Valuable Player Award (2000)
  - Vic Country U/18 (2000, 2001)
  - Vic Country U/18 Captain (2001)
  - Geelong Falcons Captain (2001)
  - Geelong Falcons Best & Fairest (2000)
  - Runner-Up Geelong Falcons Best & Fairest (2001)

== Personal life ==
Bartel has publicly discussed the domestic violence perpetrated by his father during his early life. Bartel's father kept intermittent contact with Jimmy and his sisters throughout their childhood, but Jimmy severed ties with him after his 21st birthday following a violent incident involving his father, sister, and newborn nephew. Bartel accused his father of being an aggressive and heavy drinker, and was forced to take a stand, severing all contact with his father until his death in 2010. In the aftermath of Bartel's victory in the 2007 Brownlow Medal count, the family's issues were spotlighted throughout the media, after an interview with Terry Bartel by the Herald Sun revealed his plea for reconciliation with his children.

Off the field, Bartel holds a part-time job within the Geelong Football Club's social welfare department. He studied Social Work at Deakin University, and is now completing a degree in business and law through Open University.

Growing up, Bartel was a supporter of the Richmond Football Club.

Bartel's cousin Josh is a former professional Canadian Football League punter for the Saskatchewan Roughriders and Hamilton Tiger-Cats. Josh previously had a semi-professional career with the Wodonga Bulldogs.

In 2020, he was named in the St Joseph's College team of champions, recognising the best VFL/AFL players to have attended the school.

Bartel began dating Nadia Coppolino in 2008, and he married her on the Bellarine Peninsula in 2014. Nadia runs an online clothing store called The Connection with her sister and is also the creative director of her own brand, Henne. The couple welcomed their first child on 27 November 2015. They welcomed their second son on 17 October 2018. The couple announced their separation in August 2019 after it was revealed that Jimmy was in a long-term relationship with another woman, Lauren Mand. Their divorce was finalised in August 2021. He has been in a relationship with Amelia Shepperd since July 2021. On October 1, 2022, Bartel announced on his Instagram that he and Amelia are expecting a baby girl.

In November 2023, it was reported that Bartel had successfully chased down and subdued an escaping thief who had robbed a liquor store; Bartel returned the stolen merchandise to the shopkeeper.

=== Domestic violence campaign ===
Bartel grew up being raised by a single parent (his mother) and his two sisters while his father was distant. Bartel's father was also a heavy drinker and physically abused Bartel's mother. In 2016, Bartel grew out his facial hair for a full AFL season in order to raise money for domestic violence. He continued to raise money to support related causes when he shaved the beard in October 2016.

== See also ==
- Geelong Football Club
- Brownlow Medal
- After the siren kicks in Australian rules football
