= Mathew Stokes =

Australian rules footballer (born 1984)

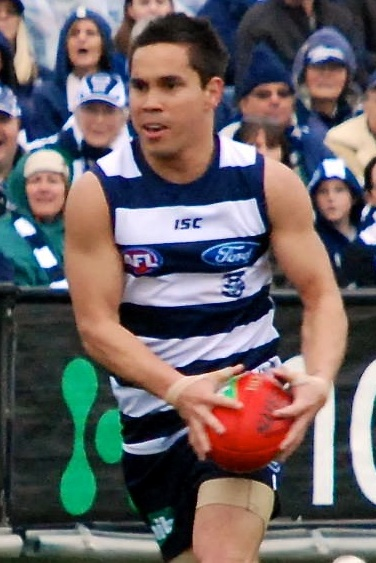
- Stokes with Geelong in July 2011

Personal information
- Full name: Mathew Stokes
- Nickname: Stokesy
- Born: 22 November 1984 (age 41); Northern Territory, Australia
- Original teams: Palmerston Magpies (NTFL); Woodville-West Torrens (SANFL)
- Draft: No. 61, 2005 National Draft
- Height: 176 cm (5 ft 9 in)
- Weight: 75 kg (165 lb)
- Position: Forward / Midfielder

Playing career^{1}
Years	Club	Games (Goals)
2006–2015	Geelong	189 (203)
2016	Essendon	11 (6)
Total		200 (209)

Representative team honours^{2}
Years	Team	Games (Goals)
2007–2009	Indigenous All-Stars	2 (0)
2008	Dream Team	1 (1)
- ^{1} Playing statistics correct to the end of 2016.^{2} Representative statistics correct as of 2008.

Career highlights
- AFL Premiership: 2007, 2011; AFL Pre-Season Premiership: 2009; McClelland Trophy: 2007, 2008

Mathew Stokes (born 22 November 1984) is a former professional Australian rules footballer who played with the Geelong Football Club and the Essendon Football Club in the Australian Football League (AFL).

== Early life ==
Mathew Stokes grew up in Darwin, Australia, with his parents John and Jennifer, and three sisters Jaylene, Anne-Maree and Amy. Stokes' ancestors were Indigenous Australian (Larrakia), Filipino and Spanish. His father is a life member of the Palmerston Magpies, having played 148 games for them in the Northern Territory Football League (NTFL). Growing up, Stokes played basketball, cricket and rugby league, but age restrictions limited his involvement in Australian rules football until he was 11 years old. Stokes' main sporting passion was for basketball, where he played at every junior level growing up and won an under-14s best and fairest award whilst still only seven years of age. When he was finally eligible to play football as an under-14, Stokes forced his way into the Palmerston Magpies senior team at only 14 years of age. In 2002, he was a member of Palmerston's premiership-winning side, and it was then that he began to switch his focus from basketball to football. Stokes' achievements in the local junior leagues saw him selected to represent Australia in the under-17's national team, alongside future AFL players Luke Hodge, Luke Ball and Nick Dal Santo.

Stokes was overlooked in the 2002 AFL draft though, and moved to Adelaide to begin playing in the South Australian National Football League (SANFL) for Woodville-West Torrens. Taking up a part-time job as a zookeeper off the field, Stokes continued to establish himself in the SANFL over the next three years. His persistence paid off when he was selected with the 61st pick in the 2005 AFL draft by the Geelong Football Club.

== AFL career ==
It was not until his seventh game, making his mark against Port Adelaide in Round 15, 2006, that he kicked two final-term goals to lift Geelong's finals chances, one of which he marked and kicked from 40m out under pressure. For the rest of the year Stokes was inconsistent and as a result was in and out of the team.

In 2006, Stokes played in Geelong's VFL grand final side, losing to the Sandringham Zebras.

Stokes cemented his spot in Geelong's best 22 players. His best game in the 2007 home-and-away season was against Fremantle, in round 17, when he kicked a career best 5 goals. He was a member of Geelong's 2007 AFL Premiership side, overcoming a dislocated kneecap in the first quarter to make a solid contribution to the team's record 119-point win over Port Adelaide.

Stokes escaped severe head injuries in a 2008 pre-season practice match against the Brisbane Lions, when in the last quarter he suffered a blow to the head after being tackled by Brisbane midfielder Albert Proud. He was declared OK after being stretchered from the ground, and despite having a sore head, didn't need to be taken to hospital.

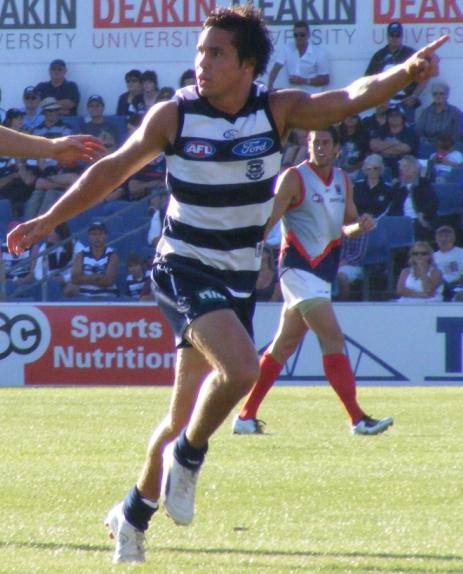
Stokes playing for Geelong in 2008

Stokes was reported in Geelong's Round 7 clash against the Brisbane Lions, after striking Brisbane's Michael Rischitelli in the match's first quarter. Stokes went on to garner two goals and 12 disposals for the game. At the AFL Tribunal, he accepted a one match suspension for the incident, but due to his poor tribunal record, which includes a four match suspension for an incident in the 2007 pre-season, his ban could not be reduced with an early plea. Stokes went on to play 22 games for 2008 including the loss in the 2008 AFL Grand Final against Hawthorn. He had a career high 31 disposals (22 kicks, 9 handballs, 13 marks and 2 goals) in the round 2, 99-point win against Essendon.

Stokes played 19 games in total for 2009, including the second qualifying final against the Western Bulldogs. He withdrew from the preliminary final against Collingwood due to groin soreness, and as a result of Geelong winning the preliminary final by a large margin and all players performing well, he could not force his selection back into the team for the grand final against St Kilda.

Stokes later revealed that the decision to withdraw from the preliminary final was driven by "letting down his teammates" in the 2008 Grand Final loss by playing unfit, and stated that:

"Someone had to miss out and the boys played well last week, so I didn't really expect to come back in. I've moved on from the fact I'm not playing and I've dealt with it and I'm quite happy with the decision because I knew the consequences of me not playing in the prelim(inary) final."

His best games of 2009 came against Brisbane in round 5 (13 kicks, 11 handballs, 4 marks and 3 goals); Sydney in round 7 (13 kicks, 8 handballs, 6 marks, 6 tackles and 3 goals) and against Adelaide in round 4 (12 kicks, 11 handballs, 6 marks, 4 tackles and 2 goals). He kicked a season high 4 goals against the Western Bulldogs in round 9. Stokes was ranked 18th in the AFL for goal assists per game in 2009.

Despite interest from the West Coast Eagles to secure Stokes, Geelong re-signed Stokes to a two-year contract extension at the conclusion of the 2009 season.

The Geelong Football Club imposed sanctions against Stokes for his 2010 drug arrest including being banned from playing for Geelong's AFL team until round eight. Stokes was an automatic inclusion to the team in round eight and played a total of 18 games for the season. His best games came in the round 11 win against West Coast at Subiaco (24 disposals, 16 kicks 8 handballs, 5 marks and a goal); the round 14 win over North Melbourne at Skilled Stadium (28 disposals, 10 kicks 18 handballs and 9 marks); the round 15 win against Hawthorn at the MCG (22 disposals, 12 kicks, 10 handballs, 3 marks and 4 goals) and in the Semi Final victory over Fremantle at the MCG, (22 disposals, 10 kicks, 12 handballs, 6 marks and 3 goals). Stokes was ranked 12th in the AFL for goal assists per game.

On 1 September 2015, Stokes announced the final round clash against Adelaide would be his last for Geelong and he was subsequently delisted, he announced his official retirement from the AFL on 6 November.

In January 2016, he came out of retirement to sign with the Essendon Football Club as a top-up player due to the club's supplements controversy. He announced in August he would retire after his 200th game in round 22 against Western Bulldogs at Etihad Stadium.

== Personal life ==
Stokes interests outside of football include feral pig shooting, and fishing. Stokes grew up supporting the Collingwood Football Club. His football hero was Nathan Buckley of Collingwood. His overall sporting hero is American basketball player, Josh Howard of the Dallas Mavericks in the NBA,

Growing up, Stokes was close friends with other future AFL players, including Trent Hentschel, Aaron Davey and Alwyn Davey.

Whilst playing in the SANFL, Stokes worked part-time as a zookeeper, and hopes to return to the profession after his football career. As a result, he studies zoology via correspondence.

On 3 February 2010, Stokes was arrested on charges of possession and trafficking of cocaine. On 27 April 2010, Stokes pleaded guilty to the possession charge in the Geelong Magistrates' Court after a deal between prosecutors and Stokes' lawyers to drop the trafficking charge. Stokes was placed on a 12-month good behaviour bond and ordered to pay $3000 to the court fund. A conviction was not recorded by the magistrate.

After retiring as a player, Stokes was employed by the AFL as its Indigenous engagement and programs manager. He remained in this role until December 2018, when he returned to the Geelong Football Club as its people and engagement manager.

== Statistics ==
Legend
G	Goals	K	Kicks	D	Disposals	T	Tackles
B	Behinds	H	Handballs	M	Marks

Season	Team	No.	Games	Totals							Averages (per game)						
Season	Team	No.	Games	G	B	K	H	D	M	T	G	B	K	H	D	M	T
2006	Geelong	27	9	9	5	72	45	117	51	23	1.0	0.6	8.0	5.0	13.0	5.7	2.6
2007	Geelong	27	21	32	15	195	159	354	111	58	1.5	0.7	9.3	7.6	16.9	5.3	2.8
2008	Geelong	27	22	38	17	235	162	397	122	54	1.7	0.7	10.7	7.4	18.0	5.5	2.5
2009	Geelong	27	19	29	19	157	143	300	75	55	1.5	1.0	8.3	7.5	15.8	3.9	2.9
2010	Geelong	27	18	28	12	166	179	345	76	32	1.6	0.7	9.2	9.9	19.2	4.2	1.8
2011	Geelong	27	22	29	16	208	233	441	95	70	1.3	0.7	9.5	10.6	20.0	4.3	3.2
2012	Geelong	27	20	15	6	149	161	310	70	63	0.8	0.3	7.5	8.1	15.5	3.5	3.2
2013	Geelong	27	24	12	6	285	348	633	123	65	0.5	0.3	11.9	14.5	26.4	5.1	2.7
2014	Geelong	27	20	7	4	270	239	509	80	55	0.4	0.2	13.5	12.0	25.4	4.0	2.8
2015	Geelong	27	14	4	2	135	132	267	58	33	0.3	0.1	9.6	9.4	19.1	4.1	2.4
2016	Essendon	48	11	6	5	107	103	210	58	30	0.6	0.4	9.7	9.4	19.1	5.3	2.7
Career			200	209	107	1979	1904	3883	919	538	1.0	0.5	9.9	9.5	19.4	4.6	2.7

== Honours and achievements ==
Brownlow Medal votes
Season	Votes
2006	2
2007	—
2008	—
2009	—
2010	3
2011	2
2012	-
2013	7
2014	6
2015	-
Total	20

- Team
  - AFL Premiership (Geelong): 2007, 2011
  - AFL Pre-Season Premiership (Geelong): 2009
  - McClelland Trophy (Geelong): 2007, 2008
  - Dream Team Representative Honours in AFL Hall of Fame Tribute Match: 2008
  - NTFL Premiership (Palmerston): 2001
