= Warren Tredrea =

Australian rules footballer, born 1978

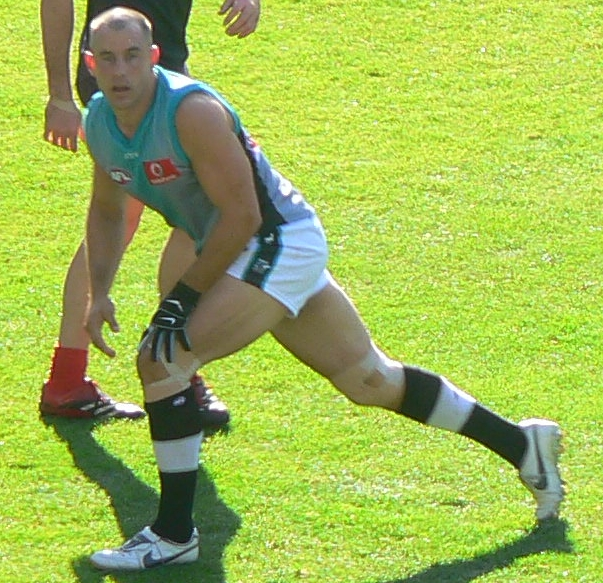
- Tredrea with Port Adelaide in 2007

Personal information
- Full name: Warren Gary Tredrea
- Nickname: Tredders
- Born: 24 December 1978 (age 47); South Australia
- Original team: Port Adelaide (SANFL)
- Draft: 1996 national draft zone selection
- Height: 194 cm (6 ft 4 in)
- Weight: 96 kg (212 lb)
- Position: Centre half-forward

Playing career^{1}
Years	Club	Games (Goals)
1997–2010	Port Adelaide	255 (549)

Representative team honours
Years	Team	Games (Goals)
1998–1999	South Australia	2 (0)

International team honours
2001–2002	Australia	3 (0)
- ^{1} Playing statistics correct to the end of 2010.

Career highlights
- Club: AFL premiership captain: (2004); Port Adelaide captain (2006–2008); 4× John Cahill Medal (2001, 2004, 2005, 2009); 8× Port Adelaide leading goal kicker (1998, 1999, 2000, 2001, 2003, 2004, 2005, 2009); 1st AFL goals kicked for Port Adelaide (549); 3rd All-Time goals kicked for Port Adelaide (582); SANFL premiership player: (1996); Representative: 3× games for Australia; 2× games for South Australia; 4× All-Australian (2001, 2002, 2003, 2004); Honours: Australian Football Hall of Fame (2014); South Australian Football Hall of Fame (2012); Port Adelaide Hall of Fame (2018); AFLCA Champion player of the year (2004); Showdown Medal (2004); AFL Rising Star nominee (1998); Peter Badcoe VC Medal: (2005)

Warren Gary Tredrea (born 24 December 1978) is a former Australian Rules Footballer with the Port Adelaide Football Club in the Australian Football League (AFL) and former weekday sports presenter on Nine News Adelaide. Since his retirement from football, he has become a sports media personality featuring on Nine News Adelaide, 3AW, FiveAA, and in The Advertiser newspaper. Tredrea went on to become one of the best forwards in the competition, gaining a long list of individual accolades, including being a premiership winning captain, four Port Adelaide Best and Fairests, eight club Leading Goalkicking awards, an AFL Coaches Association 'Champion Player of the Year' Award, and selection in four All-Australian sides.

== Early life and education ==
Warren Gary Tredrea was born on 24 December 1978, the son of former Collingwood and Port Adelaide player Gary Tredrea.

He attended St Michael's College in Adelaide.

He played most of his junior football as a wingman before a substantial growth spurt at the age of 16 saw him transformed into a key position player. He won both Port Adelaide's Under-17 Coach's Trophy and the St Michael's College Student Athlete award in 1995.

== Port Adelaide ==
=== SANFL debut: 1996 ===
Tredrea made his senior South Australian National Football League (SANFL) debut for Port Adelaide in 1996, managing nine games and capping his rookie year with a premiership medallion, booting two goals in Port Adelaide's 36-point Grand Final victory over Central District. Tredrea was zone selected for the inaugural Port Adelaide squad in the AFL. Debuting in 1997, he only played one game but went on to be Port Adelaide's leading goal kicker in the following five seasons.

=== AFL debut: 1997–1999 ===
As an 18-year-old developing forward Tredrea found his opportunities for senior football limited, with his largely anonymous debut in Round 2 against Essendon being his sole outing for the Power in 1997. During this time Tredrea managed 16 games for 16 goals with Port Adelaide back in the local league, ending his year on a sour note with a steady performance in the Magpies' defeat to Norwood in the 1997 SANFL Grand Final.

After showing glimpses of his ability in the first six rounds of the 1998 AFL season, in Round 7 against Carlton at Optus Oval he performed very well, with 22 disposals, 17 marks, eight goals (a club record), three Brownlow Medal votes, and an AFL Rising Star nomination. His starring role in the 89-point win came at a cost however, with a dislocated kneecap suffered late in the final quarter keeping him out until Round 13. Upon his return to the side Tredrea struggled for consistency, but won his first South Australian guernsey with his selection to the State of Origin side to face Western Australia. He gave good performances against Essendon (Round 15, four goals), Melbourne (Round 20, 11 marks, three goals) and Fremantle (Round 21, six goals) followed. He ended the season as leading goalkicker with 33 goals, beating leading goalkicker of 1997, Scott Cummings by a goal.

He finished the following season in 1999, on 40 goals as leading goalkicker again. Where Port Adelaide made the finals for the first time in their AFL history.

=== Premier competition player: 2000–2003 ===
After finishing 14th at the end of the 2000 season, he led the goalkicking for the third year in a row, with 32 goals. In 2001, Tredrea scored 51 goals and took 169 marks, making a major contribution to his side's rise from 14th to 3rd on the AFL ladder. Tredrea was rewarded for his season winning his maiden John Cahill Medal as Port Adelaide's best and fairest player, and the first of four selections as All-Australian centre half forward. Further outstanding seasons followed in 2002, by kicking 49 goals (just missing out on being the leading goal kicking by three goals behind Stuart Dew) with an All-Australian selection, and in 2003, he booted 58 goals, being the leading goal kicker for the club a fifth time and getting another All-Australian.

=== Career high: 2004–2005 ===
The 2004 season is considered Tredrea's best year as he led Port Adelaide to its first AFL premiership in the absence of the injured captain Matthew Primus. He started the year in fine fashion, kicking six goals alongside Stuart Dew in the club's 96-point victory over Essendon. He then kicked five goals against West Coast the following week and booted four goals against Hawthorn in Round 3. He gained captaincy for the entire year after Primus re-injured his knee in Round 3. He had a season-high seven goals in Round 7 in the showdown against Adelaide. He went on to kick six goals against Carlton in Round 15 and against West Coast in Round 17. He then captained the team into the finals and eventually captained them to the premiership win over the Brisbane Lions. He booted 81 goals (career best) and took 192 marks playing in all 25 of the Power's games for the season as well as reaping a host of awards, including his fourth All-Australian centre half forward guernsey, the All-Australian vice-captaincy, his second John Cahill Medal as Port's Best and Fairest player, the AFL Coaches' Association Most Valuable Player award, the Showdown Medal, a raft of media awards and was the pre-count favourite for the Brownlow Medal, only to poll a disappointing 15 votes behind the eventual winner, Chris Judd, who admitted in his acceptance speech "I thought Warren Tredrea was a shoo-in to be honest".

At the beginning of the 2005 season, he kicked five goals in a two-point win in the grand final rematch against the Brisbane Lions and again kicked five goals in Round 5 in the four-point loss against Geelong. In Round 7 there was a controversy after a celebration in Port Adelaide's 47-point victory over the Kangaroos, when after kicking one of his six goals in a best-on-ground performance, he put his hand to his ear in a demonstrative "phonecall" celebration. Tredrea stated that as an Arsenal fan, the celebration was an homage to Thierry Henry who had "then" recently celebrated in the same fashion. In Round 13, he kicked seven goals against Hawthorn in Port Adelaide's biggest victory, earning him three Brownlow votes. Port barely scraped into the finals series in eighth place before bowing out at the Semi Final stage to Adelaide. Tredrea kicked 65 goals and took a personal best 220 marks to win his third John Cahill Medal, despite narrowly losing his All-Australian mantle to Fremantle's Matthew Pavlich.

=== Decline: 2006–2008 ===
With the retirement of Primus at the end of 2005, Tredrea took over the captaincy role full-time for the 2006 season, but like his predecessor, was struck down by a serious knee injury, suffering a dislocated left kneecap in a preseason game against the Brisbane Lions. Upon his return to the side in Round 4, Tredrea was still hampered by the knee, and with a couple of exceptions his overall performances were relatively poor. When it became obvious in Round 15 after only kicking one goal against Geelong and with the Power looking like not making the finals, Tredrea had surgery on his knee in August 2006. His recovery was slow, and he was unable to undergo enough preseason training. He finally made his return to competitive football with a seven-goal performance for Port Adelaide in the SANFL in April.

In Round 12 2007, Tredrea played his 200th senior appearance for the club against the team he first played against, Essendon, and in doing so became the first Port player to reach that milestone in the club's AFL era. In a return to form, Tredrea booted four goals in the Power's 31-point victory over Essendon at AAMI Stadium. In Round 16, after kicking three goals against Richmond, he bruised his bone and ended up missing a month of football before returning in Round 20 against Hawthorn in Tasmania. In the Qualifying Final against West Coast, he helped Port win the game with an excellent check side goal and a Shepherd to give them the three-point win.

In the 2007 Grand Final Tredrea was one of Port's few good players, kicking two goals in Port Adelaide's record Grand Final defeat to Geelong. In December 2007 he re-signed with the Power for a further year. After speculation he would not be reappointed due to lingering doubts over his durability and longevity, Tredrea was reappointed as club captain for 2008 after impressive pre-season form.

He captained the team again in 2008, kicking two goals in Port's Grand Final rematch against Geelong and again the following week. He booted four goals against Hawthorn in Round 8 (three goals in the first quarter) and again kicked four goals against Fremantle in Round 17, eventually dislocating his shoulder in the final term, ending his year. Despite criticism and queries over his form for the bulk of the year, Tredrea performed well in season 2008, kicking 31 goals and registering 28 score assists in 17 games.

=== Late career and retirement: 2009–2010 ===
Tredrea started the first two games of 2009 slowly but in Round 3 he kicked six goals against the Demons - the first time he had kicked five or more goals since Round 15, 2005. The next week he kicked his 500th goal, and kicked another six goals against the Hawks before kicking seven goals against Richmond in Round 8. He booted three goals in the Geelong loss in Round 13 and kicked four goals against the Brisbane Lions in Round 21, which was his final game for the year. Tredrea booted 51 goals in 21 games of the season, his best return since 2005 and the eighth time he had topped the Port Adelaide goal-kicking chart. At season's end he was awarded his fourth John Cahill Medal as Port Adelaide's best and fairest player.

At the start of 2010, he became the last inaugural player for the club who played with the Power (Nathan Eagleton was also the only other inaugural Port Adelaide player still competing in the league, although he was playing for the Western Bulldogs until his retirement at the end of the 2010 season). Tredrea started 2010 well, kicking two goals and picking up 13 disposals against North Melbourne at AAMI Stadium. Tredrea played his 250th game with a win against the West Coast Eagles in Round 2 at Subiaco Oval.

In Round 7, 2010, Tredrea collided with teammate Matt Thomas and damaged his ankle ligaments. On 26 July 2010, as a result of the injury, Tredrea retired, having played 255 games with a return of 549 goals.

He is considered by many to be the greatest Port Adelaide player of its AFL era. He was farewelled with a lap of honour in Port Adelaide's Round 18 win over Hawthorn and a testimonial dinner on 5 November 2010.

== Post-retirement career ==
Tredrea joined the Nine Network in 2013. He presented the Nine News Adelaide Weekday Sports Bulletin until being dismissed in January 2022 for not adhering to Nine Network's COVID-19 vaccination policy. He sued Nine for $6 million in lost wages, but, after a failed appeal, was ordered to pay Nine's legal costs. In June 2025, Tredrea told the Federal Court that he could not pay because he does not believe in Australian legal tender, and issued Nine a promissory note in precious metals.

In March 2023, he joined the FIVEaa Sports Show team, as a regular guest and expert commentator during the AFL season. In June 2025 5AA issued a statement saying that they were "having a very close look" at his contract, after his comments on the Nine Network court case outcome.

In March 2025, Tredrea launched a podcast named Ballsy on Spotify, described as a forum where "fearless guests bare their souls and disrupt belief systems". In June 2025, he posted a video on Instagram from an episode of his podcast in which a British Army veteran AJ Roberts promoted various conspiracy theories, including that Islamic State was created by Israeli spy agency Mossad, with the collusion of US president Barack Obama, and that Zionists were responsible for controlling World War II. The post was criticised by the Jewish Council of Australia, which represents non-Zionist Australian Jews and supports Palestinian causes, as antisemitic. Tredrea released a statement on his Instagram (25 June 2025) "Views are guests own" and "I unequivocally comdemn war and genocide" and "I am not in any way, shape, or form, an antisemite, and consider it defamatory for anyone to accuse me as such". https://www.instagram.com/p/DLUlJjhzw87/?img_index=1 Tredrea is also a member of the Port Adelaide board.

== Playing statistics ==
Legend
G	Goals	K	Kicks	D	Disposals	T	Tackles
B	Behinds	H	Handballs	M	Marks
#	Played in that season's premiership team

Season	Team	No.	Games	Totals							Averages (per game)						
Season	Team	No.	Games	G	B	K	H	D	M	T	G	B	K	H	D	M	T
1997	Port Adelaide	16	1	0	0	2	2	4	0	1	0.0	0.0	2.0	2.0	4.0	0.0	1.0
1998	Port Adelaide	16	17	33	18	118	57	175	67	17	1.9	1.1	6.9	3.4	10.3	3.9	1.0
1999	Port Adelaide	16	20	40	30	190	105	295	133	17	2.0	1.5	9.5	5.3	14.8	6.7	0.9
2000	Port Adelaide	16	21	32	35	186	96	282	120	35	1.5	1.7	8.9	4.6	13.4	5.7	1.7
2001	Port Adelaide	16	23	51	36	277	98	375	169	33	2.2	1.6	12.0	4.3	16.3	7.3	1.4
2002	Port Adelaide	16	25	49	41	298	102	400	195	37	2.0	1.6	11.9	4.1	16.0	7.8	1.5
2003	Port Adelaide	16	23	58	36	256	130	386	198	30	2.5	1.6	11.1	5.7	16.8	8.6	1.3
2004^{#}	Port Adelaide	16	25	81	44	286	105	391	192	30	3.2	1.8	11.4	4.2	15.6	7.7	1.2
2005	Port Adelaide	16	24	65	45	307	88	395	220	33	2.7	1.9	12.8	3.7	16.5	9.2	1.4
2006	Port Adelaide	1	11	17	8	99	39	138	75	20	1.5	0.7	9.0	3.5	12.5	6.8	1.8
2007	Port Adelaide	1	20	31	21	151	61	212	104	34	1.6	1.1	7.6	3.1	10.6	5.2	1.7
2008	Port Adelaide	1	17	31	19	155	71	226	105	25	1.8	1.1	9.1	4.2	13.3	6.2	1.5
2009	Port Adelaide	16	21	51	27	188	91	279	143	33	2.4	1.3	9.0	4.3	13.3	6.8	1.6
2010	Port Adelaide	16	7	10	2	51	28	79	30	8	1.4	0.3	7.3	4.0	11.3	4.3	1.1
Career			255	549	362	2564	1073	3637	1751	353	2.2	1.4	10.1	4.2	14.3	6.9	1.4

== Honours and achievements ==
**Brownlow Medal votes**
Season	Votes
1997	—
1998	4
1999	7
2000	1
2001	8
2002	9
2003	16
2004	15
2005	11
2006	1
2007	—
2008	1
2009	7
2010	—
**Total**	**80**
Key:
Green / **Bold** = Won

Team:

- AFL Premiership (Port Adelaide): 2004
- AFL McClelland Trophy (Port Adelaide): 2002, 2003, 2004
- AFL Wizard Cup (Port Adelaide): 2002
- SANFL Premiership (Port Adelaide): 1996

Individual:

- All-Australian: 2001, 2002, 2003, 2004 (vice-captain)
- AFL Norwich Rising Star Nomination: 1998
- AFL Coaches Association 'Champion Player of the Year' Award: 2004
- AFL Players Association 'Champion Player of the Year' Award: 2003 (3rd place), 2004 (3rd place)
- John Cahill Medal: 2001, 2004, 2005, 2009
- John Cahill Medal 'Runner-Up': 1999, 2002, 2003
- Port Adelaide F.C. Captain: 2004, 2006–2008
- Port Adelaide F.C. Life Membership: 2005 induction
- Port Adelaide F.C. Leading Club Goalkicker award (8): 1998, 1999, 2000, 2001, 2003, 2004, 2005, 2009
- Port Adelaide F.C. Most career AFL goals: 549
- Port Adelaide F.C. Most goals in an AFL game: 8 (Round 7, 1998)
- Port Adelaide F.C. Most Improved Player award: 1998, 1999
- Herald Sun Player of the Year Award: 2004
- 3AW Player of the Year Award: 2004
- The Advertiser Player of the Year: Award 2004
- Triple M Player of the Year Award: 2004
- The Age Player of the Year Award: 2004
- West End Showdown Medal XVI: 2004
- Peter Badcoe VC Medal 2005 round 5
- SANFL Hall of Fame Inductee 2012
- Australian Football Hall of Fame Inductee 2014

Milestones:

- AFL debut: Round 2, 1997 (vs. Essendon) at Football Park (Port Adelaide lost by 33 points)
- Finals debut: Qualifying final, 1999 (vs. Kangaroos) at the MCG (Port Adelaide lost by 44 points)
- 50th game: Round 13, 2000 (vs. Collingwood) at Football Park (Port Adelaide won by 14 points)
- 100th game: Round 18, 2002 (vs. St Kilda) at the Football Park (Port Adelaide won by 42 points)
- 150th game: Round 20, 2004 (vs. Western Bulldogs) at Marrara Oval (Port Adelaide won by 86 points)
- 200th game: Round 12, 2007 (vs. Essendon) at the AAMI stadium (Port Adelaide won by 31 points)
- 250th game: Round 2, 2010 (vs. West Coast) at the Subiaco Oval (Port Adelaide won by 3 points)
- Final game: Round 7, 2010 (vs. Essendon) at Etihad Stadium (Port Adelaide won by 3 points)
