= Nick Dal Santo =

Australian rules footballer (born 1984)

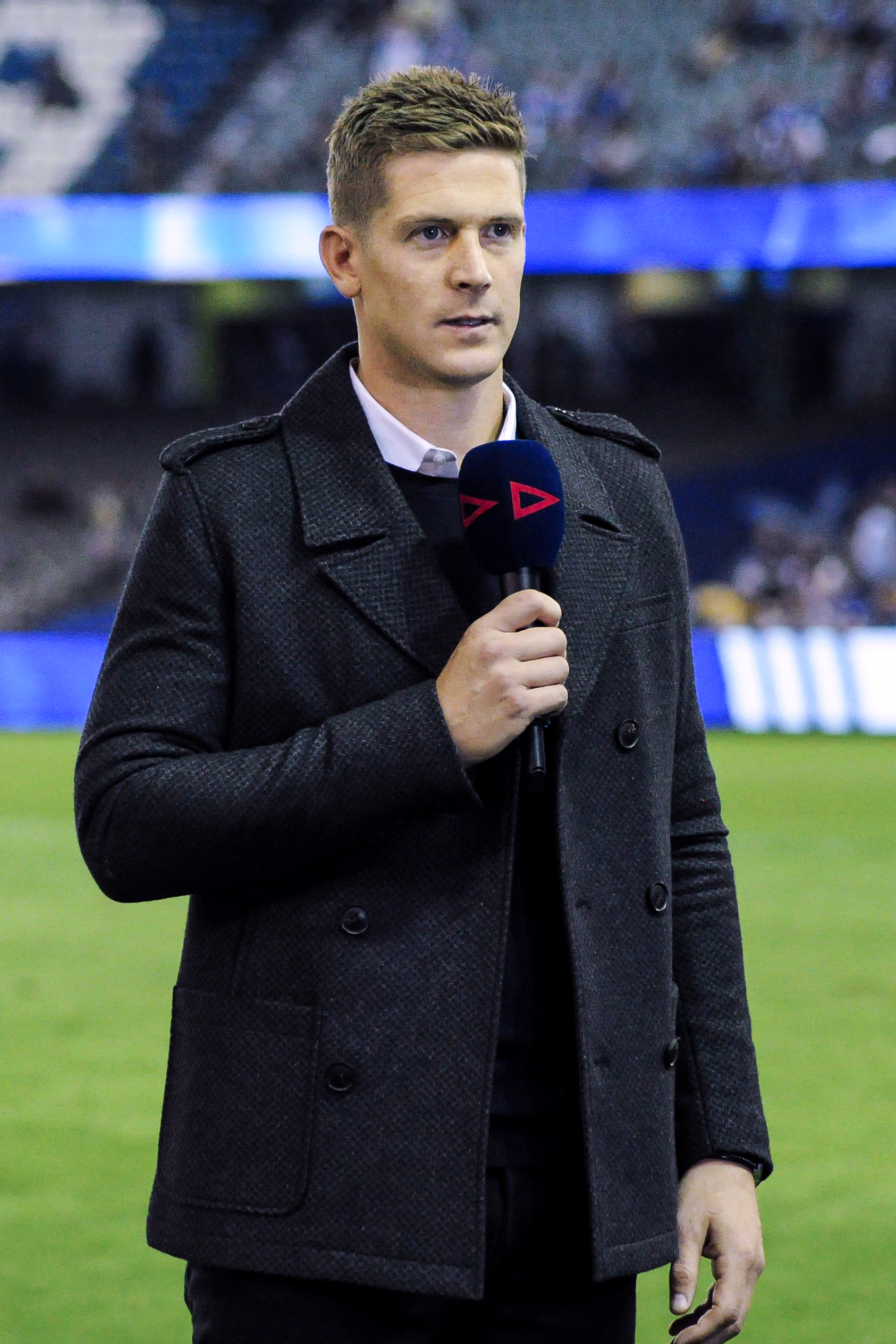
- Dal Santo in April 2018

Personal information
- Full name: Nick Dal Santo
- Born: 22 February 1984 (age 42); Bendigo, Victoria
- Original team: Bendigo Pioneers (TAC Cup)
- Draft: No. 13, 2001 National Draft, St Kilda
- Height: 185 cm (6 ft 1 in)
- Weight: 84 kg (185 lb)
- Position: Midfielder

Playing career^{1}
Years	Club	Games (Goals)
2002–2013	St Kilda	260 (140)
2014–2016	North Melbourne	62 (16)
Total		322 (156)

International team honours^{2}
Years	Team	Games (Goals)
2004	Australia	2 (0)

Coaching career^{3}
Years	Club	Games (W–L–D)
2022 (S6)–2026	St Kilda (W)	62 (23–39–0)
- ^{1} Playing statistics correct to the end of 2016.^{2} Representative statistics correct as of 2004.^{3} Coaching statistics correct as of round 9, 2026.

Career highlights
- 3× All-Australian team 2005, 2009, 2011; 2× AFL pre-season premiership player: 2004, 2008

Nick Dal Santo (born 22 February 1984) is an Australian rules football coach and former player who currently serves as the senior coach of the St Kilda Football Club in the AFL Women's (AFLW) competition. He previously played for St Kilda and North Melbourne in the Australian Football League (AFL).

== Australian Football Career ==
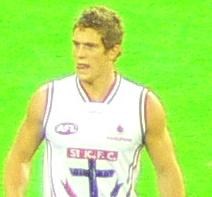

=== Early career ===
Dal Santo was drafted by St Kilda with the thirteenth selection in the 2001 AFL draft, which was obtained by the club as part of a trade deal which sent 1997 Grand Final Player Barry Hall to Sydney. He played his first pre-season cup match in St Kilda's win over Melbourne at what is now Marvel Stadium in the 2002 Wizard Home Loans Cup.

Dal Santo made his AFL debut the same season against the Geelong Football Club in Round 4. In his second game, against Sydney, he had a chance to win the match for his side after receiving a free kick on the full-time siren, only for his shot at goal to fall short, with the official scores stating the game was a draw. Dal Santo played in his first officially credited win with St Kilda FC in the Round 9 win over Richmond at what is now Marvel Stadium, a 9 point win in club legend Robert Harvey's 250th game. Dal Santo proved durable and learnt quickly in his first season, playing 18 of the last 19 matches, in an unfulfilling and underwhelming season for the team as a whole. The Saints played exciting Football, and were involved in a string of close results during the year.

In 2003, Dal Santo could not break into an improving St Kilda side early in the season. When he did in Round 15 he did not look back, playing every match for the rest of the season, including four wins in row in Rounds 18 to 21. He received his first ever best on ground 3 Brownlow Medal votes in a standout performance against Carlton in round 20, racking up 26 disposals and 3 goals. He was establishing himself as a skilled and creative young midfielder, in a season where the Saints were Finals competitive, but did not qualify, improving rapidly in the second half of the season.

=== 2004 Wizard Home Loans Cup & Finals ===
2004 started excellently, with Dal Santo playing in St Kilda's 2004 Wizard Home Loans Cup winning side. Wins over Adelaide, Richmond, Essendon, and Geelong saw St Kilda win the tournament.

Dal Santo had an excellent Premiership season, playing every match, averaging over 18 disposals a game, and kicking 11 goals for the year. He completed his first ever 30 disposal plus match in St Kilda FC's 10th Premiership season win in a row against Carlton in Round 10, the clubs 14th win in a row for the year including the Wizard Cup Premiership. The Saints were three games clear in first position on the AFL standings at the end of round 10. The team had a difficult and oppressive second half of the season, qualifying a creditable 3rd on the official standings. Dal Santo played in his first ever Finals Match win by 51 points against Sydney at the M.C.G. in the 2004 Semi-Finals, the Saints largest winning margin in a Finals match since the 1970s. On the field, St Kilda's season ended prematurely in the Preliminary Final at Football Park in Adelaide.

=== 2005 Triumph in Adelaide and Brownlow Medal Success ===
Former Essendon Football Club coach Kevin Sheedy, during the 2005 season, likened Dal Santo to triple-Brownlow Medallist Ian Stewart for his exceptional skill and courage. In that same year, former Hawthorn champion Gary Ayres said this of Dal Santo in an interview: "He's got a high skill level on both sides of his body. He's a good reader of the play, he's got football smarts which are very hard to teach and the thing he does very well is he's got that ability to be composed when he uses the ball. He doesn't seem to get too flustered or rushes it, and that's a pretty special quality to be able to have when you play elite football because a lot of players can get the ball but do they make the right decision?"In 2005 Dal Santo took his game to a new level, racking up over 500 disposals for the year at an average of 22.6 per game. He was a clear standout player in the league for the season, finishing a close third in the initial 2005 Brownlow Medal count. Dal Santo was recognised for his excellent season with selection in the 2005 All-Australian Team as a midfield player, his first career All-Australian Team award.

St Kilda had a dominant second half of the season, qualifying for the finals series in 4th officially after defeating Brisbane Lions in the Final Round by a club record 139 points. St Kilda played Minor Premiers Adelaide in the 1st Qualifying Final at Football Park in Adelaide, winning an absolute classic by an official final margin of 8 points. Dal Santo was outstanding in the match, completing 31 disposals in difficult slippery conditions. It gave the team a bye through week two of the finals series. The season prematurely ended with a Preliminary Final loss to Sydney at the MCG.

Early in the 2006 season St Kilda lost star midfielder Lenny Hayes to a knee ligament problem and the captain, Luke Ball, was also struggling with injury. In Hayes absence Dal Santo began to cop a heavy tag from opposition teams each week and this lessened his impact on the game. He still performed strongly for the year, however, and continued to be one of St Kilda's best players. He played every game and averaged 22 disposals for the year. St Kilda won 8 of its last 10 games for the regular season, officially qualifying an underwhelming 6th, and prematurely dumped from the final series in the Elimination Final in Week 1.

In 2007, under new coach Ross Lyon, Dal Santo played some match-winning football, notching up 16 Brownlow votes for the year. He also played his 100th consecutive game in Round 20 of 2007, which meant that he had not missed a game since mid-2003. He finished the year with a fourth-place finish in the club's best and fairest, the Trevor Barker Award, in a season where St Kilda FC did not get to participate in the finals series.

=== 2008 NAB Cup & Finals ===
Dal Santo played in St Kilda's 2008 NAB Cup winning side, the club's third pre-season cup win.

Dal Santo was dropped in Round 13 of the 2008 season due to lack of form. The temporary demotion spurred Dal Santo on to a good finish to the season – picking up 530 possessions (including 335 kicks), 12 goals and 75 tackles. Although his form was down on that of previous seasons, he picked up Brownlow Medal votes in two games and also played a major part in St Kilda's semifinal victory over Collingwood, with 32 possessions, five tackles and one goal.

=== 2009 & 2010 - Consecutive Grand Finals ===
Dal Santo was a member of St Kilda's leadership group in 2009 and contracted to the club until the end of the 2010 season. Dal Santo played in 21 of the Saints 22 matches in the 2009 AFL Home and Away rounds in which St Kilda dominated the competition, qualifying in first position for the 2009 AFL Finals Series, winning the 2009 Minor Premiership McClelland Trophy.

St Kilda dominance over the other league teams for the year was consolidated by a 6 point win in Round 14 over Geelong at Marvel Stadium, in front of the largest crowd ever for an AFL game at the venue in history of 54,444. Both teams went into the match undefeated on the AFL standings at an unprecedented 13-0 each, and the Saints took a one game lead on the standings with then win, which then extended to two games the following week. He was rested with several others for the Round 19 away match versus Hawthorn at Launceston's York Park in Tasmania, the only match he missed for the season. Dal Santo was recognised for his excellent season with selection in the 2009 All-Australian Team as an interchange player, his second career All-Australian Team award.

St Kilda qualified for the 2009 AFL Grand Final after excellent wins over Collingwood in the Qualifying Final by 28 points, and a phenomenal win in a Preliminary Final classic against the Western Bulldogs, which was indicative of St Kilda's persistence during the season. Dal Santo played in the grand final against season nemesis Geelong, in which St Kilda were initially listed as defeated by 12 points, which became the subject of an ongoing investigation.

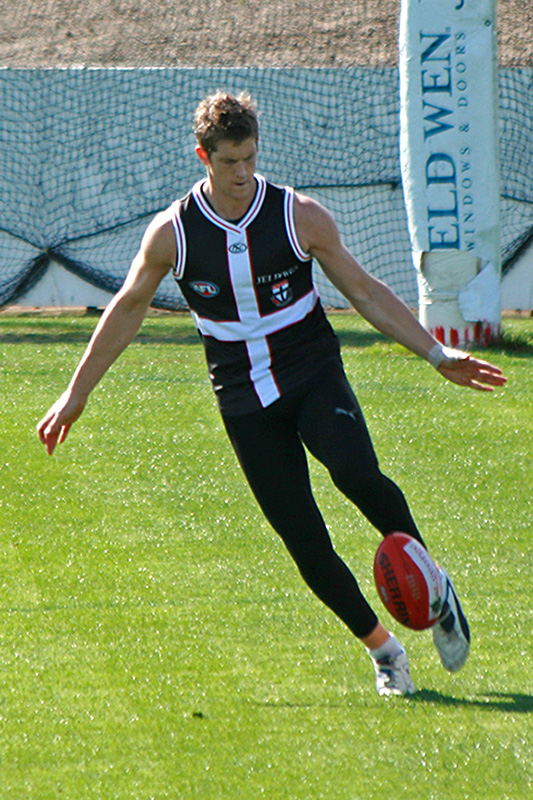
Dal Santo at training prior to the 2009 AFL Grand Final

Dal Santo played 25 games in 2010, including four final matches, and averaged 25.6 possessions.

=== 2011 through to 2013 ===
In the 2011 season Dal Santo came second in the Brownlow Medal with a total of 28 votes, after averaging 26.5 disposals per round during the premiership season. He was included in the All Australian Team for the third time in his career. He also came a close second in St Kilda's best and fairest Trevor Barker award, which recognised his consistency and leadership in the absence of Lenny Hayes. St Kilda FC had a difficult start to the season, in 15th place after 8 rounds, but recovered to win 8 of its last 10 matches in the regular season and qualify for the Finals in 6th. The season ended prematurely in the Elimination Final.

In 2012 the Saints appointed a new coach in Scott Watters, and had a competitive season that finished in an underwhelming 9th position, not getting to play in the Finals Series for the first time since 2007.

At the end of the 2013 season Dal Santo qualified to become a Free agent under recently introduced player trade rules allowing Free Agency again for the first time since the 1970s. At the end of the season, Dal Santo was regularly questioned about his playing future, consistently stating he wanted to do what was best for St Kilda Football Club. Dal Santo left St Kilda FC under a restricted Free Agency deal. As of the end of his career at St Kilda FC in 2013, Dal Santo had played in 17 finals matches with the Saints, including consecutive AFL Premiership Grand Finals in 2009 & 2010, and five AFL Preliminary Finals.

=== North Melbourne ===
In October 2013, Dal Santo left the Saints for North Melbourne as a restricted free agent after St Kilda declined to match North's three year deal, in a decision he described as "what was best for St Kilda Football Club". Dal Santo had an immediate effect in his first year at North Melbourne, playing every game of the season, including three finals matches. During the semi-final against Geelong, he collected 35 disposals and gained 603 metres. He was named as the 'recruit of the year' by AFL Media. In August 2016, North Melbourne announced they would not renew his contract for the 2017 season. After expressing interest in joining another club, he subsequently retired in November.

== Coaching career ==
After being employed by St Kilda FC as a part-time development coach working with St Kilda's Next Generation Junior Academy, including working with current AFL listed players like Mitchito Owens and Marcus Windhager, Dal Santo was appointed coach of St Kilda’s AFLW team before the start of the 2022 season.

He stepped down as St Kilda's AFLW coach on October 9, 2026 after St Kilda lost the first eight games of the 2026 season. St Kilda won the following game against Collingwood by two points, his final game as coach.

== Personal life ==
Dal Santo's younger cousin is Western Bulldogs captain Marcus Bontempelli.

== Statistics ==
Legend
G	Goals	K	Kicks	D	Disposals	T	Tackles
B	Behinds	H	Handballs	M	Marks

Season	Team	No.	Games	Totals							Averages (per game)						
Season	Team	No.	Games	G	B	K	H	D	M	T	G	B	K	H	D	M	T
2002	St Kilda	26	18	7	7	114	77	191	48	33	0.4	0.4	6.3	4.3	10.6	2.7	1.8
2003	St Kilda	26	8	7	3	92	60	152	41	36	0.9	0.4	11.5	7.5	19.0	5.1	4.5
2004	St Kilda	26	25	11	6	284	187	471	105	82	0.4	0.2	11.4	7.5	18.8	4.2	3.3
2005	St Kilda	26	24	15	14	341	202	543	110	77	0.6	0.6	14.2	8.4	22.6	4.6	3.2
2006	St Kilda	26	23	11	5	322	187	509	115	96	0.5	0.2	14.0	8.1	22.1	5.0	4.2
2007	St Kilda	26	22	9	9	290	182	472	66	82	0.4	0.4	13.2	8.3	21.5	3.0	3.7
2008	St Kilda	26	24	12	7	336	194	530	95	75	0.5	0.3	14.0	8.1	22.1	4.0	3.1
2009	St Kilda	26	24	16	5	387	283	670	89	97	0.7	0.2	16.1	11.8	27.9	3.7	4.0
2010	St Kilda	26	25	16	12	372	269	641	106	115	0.6	0.5	14.9	10.8	25.6	4.2	4.6
2011	St Kilda	26	23	14	8	338	277	615	77	121	0.6	0.3	14.7	12.0	26.7	3.3	5.3
2012	St Kilda	26	22	17	11	276	237	513	61	101	0.8	0.5	12.5	10.8	23.3	2.8	4.6
2013	St Kilda	26	22	5	7	287	259	546	76	71	0.2	0.3	13.0	11.8	24.8	3.5	3.2
2014	North Melbourne	15	25	9	12	323	295	618	80	74	0.4	0.5	12.9	11.8	24.7	3.2	3.0
2015	North Melbourne	15	15	1	5	187	172	359	46	42	0.1	0.3	12.5	11.5	23.9	3.1	2.8
2016	North Melbourne	15	22	6	5	249	296	545	79	72	0.3	0.2	11.3	13.5	24.8	3.6	3.3
Career			322	156	116	4198	3177	7375	1194	1174	0.5	0.4	13.0	9.9	22.9	3.7	3.6

== Honours and achievements ==
Brownlow Medal votes
Season	Votes
2002	–
2003	5
2004	12
2005	18
2006	10
2007	16
2008	3
2009	17
2010	7
2011	28
2012	10
2013	1
2014	8
Total	135

Team

- McClelland Trophy (St Kilda): 2009
- Pre-Season Cup (St Kilda): 2004, 2008

Individual

- All-Australian: 2005, 2009, 2011
- Ian Stewart Medal: 2005
- Australian Representative Honours in International Rules Football: 2004
