= Ken Hall (Australian footballer) =

Australian rules footballer (born 1980)

Personal information
- Born: 13 November 1980 (age 45)
- Original teams: Tassie Mariners, North Hobart
- Draft: 46th overall, 2002 rookie draft
- Height: 178 cm (5 ft 10 in)
- Weight: 83 kg (183 lb)
- Positions: Defender, midfielder

Playing career^{1}
Years	Club	Games (Goals)
2002–2003	Essendon	1 (0)
- ^{1} Playing statistics correct to the end of 2003.

Ken Hall (born 13 November 1980) is a former Australian rules football player from Tasmania. He played junior football in his home state and spent two years in the seniors at North Hobart in the Tasmanian Football League (TFL). Hall then moved to Victoria in 2001 to play for Essendon Football Club's reserves side in the Victorian Football League (VFL).

He played for the reserves for a year before being drafted onto Essendon's rookie list for the 2002 season. Hall was promoted to the senior list midway through 2002 and made his Australian Football League (AFL) debut that year, although he did not record a statistic in what was to be his only AFL match. He was retained on the Bombers' rookie list for 2003 and was again elevated to the senior list during the season. Although he was often named as an emergency after his promotion, Hall was unable to break into the senior team and Essendon delisted him at the end of 2003, ending his AFL career.

After being delisted Hall played with the Tasmanian Devils in the VFL for four seasons, before rejoining his old side, North Hobart, in 2008. He won two best and fairest awards and captained the club in his time with North Hobart before retiring at the conclusion of the 2011 season.

== Early career ==
A Tasmanian native, Hall played junior football for North Hobart Football Club's under-18 side in the Tasmanian Football League (TFL), as well as representing his under-18 state side, the Tassie Mariners, in the TAC Cup. He broke his wrist while playing for North Hobart's under-18s in 1997 and broke the same wrist again in April 1998, this time while playing for the Mariners. Hall recovered from the injury by August and was back playing for the Mariners.

In 1999, Hall was no longer eligible in the under-18s and so became a regular fixture in North Hobart's senior side. He played as a defender, occasionally being required to shut down the opposition's star players, and was regularly named as one of the Demons' better players. Hall started the 2000 season playing as a centre half-forward for the Demons, despite his relatively small size. In the first game of the year he kicked a match winning goal as North Hobart defeated Clarence by 11 points. By May, Hall was again playing on the half-back line. His form in defence was described as "reliable" and "solid" in the middle of the season by The Mercury. The young Demons side unexpectedly reached the finals and caused an upset in the semi-final against the heavily favoured Burnie Dockers; Hall was named as the Demons' "best player without question" by The Mercury. At the conclusion of the season, Hall was named as back pocket in the Tasmanian side and as the North Hobart player with the most potential.

With the breakup of the TFL at the end of the 2000 season, many of Tasmania's best young footballers, including Hall, moved interstate to play at a higher level of football. Hall began training with Australian Football League (AFL) side Essendon in December 2000 in the hope of being drafted. The Bombers lost draft picks that year due to salary cap violations and Hall went undrafted, but was instead placed on the Bombers' supplementary list, playing with Essendon's reserves side in the Victorian Football League (VFL).

== AFL career ==
After impressing with the reserves in 2001, Hall was drafted by Essendon with the 46th selection in the 2002 AFL Rookie draft, thereby placing him on the Bombers' rookie list. Speaking to The Mercury, Hall described the opportunity as exciting said that it has always been his dream to play in the AFL. In the lead-up to the 2002 season Hall played in all three of Essendon's pre-season matches. Rookie listed players must be promoted to the senior list before they can play a senior AFL match, so Hall began the 2002 season playing in the VFL for Essendon's reserves team.

When Dean Solomon suffered a season-ending knee injury in late March, Hall was one of three players in contention to be promoted to the senior list in place of Solomon. After one month of assessment Hall was deemed the most impressive of Essendon's three rookies and was elevated to the senior list. In early June, Hall played particularly well in defence for the reserves against the Murray Kangaroos, and was subsequently in consideration to play for Essendon's senior team. Essendon had been plagued by injury throughout 2002 and this, coupled with Hall's good form in the VFL, resulted in him making his AFL debut in round 12 against Hawthorn. After a poor performance in his debut match, in which he did not record a statistic and spent most of the match on the bench, Hall was dropped backed to the VFL the following round. Despite showing good form in the VFL for the remainder of 2002, Hall was unable to break back into the senior Bombers line-up. Although Hall failed to have an impact at AFL level, he played well at VFL level and came third in the reserves' best and fairest award.

Hall was retained on the Bombers' rookie list for 2003. Although Essendon had another poor pre-season, losing four of the five matches they played, Hall played in each of the games. He was described as "perform[ing] well" in The Age newspaper, and even kicked a goal in the first match. After spending the majority of his career prior to 2003 as a defender, Hall was trialled as a midfielder for the 2003 season, a move which reaped immediate results as he became a "goalscoring weapon" for the Bendigo Bombers—Essendon's new VFL-affiliate side—as well as becoming known for his penetrating kicking.

In early August, Hall kicked four goals in a close win against the Northern Bullants in the VFL, and three days later Essendon coach Kevin Sheedy declared that Hall and two others were in contention to be promoted to the senior list, even though he had missed out on being elevated two weeks prior. Sheedy proceeded to promote Hall, in place of the injured Joel Reynolds, in order to "see if [Hall] will be a viable option come finals time". He was immediately named in Essendon's 25-man squad to play against the Western Bulldogs, but failed to make the starting 22.

Despite not playing a senior match for the entirety of the regular season, there was media speculation that Hall may be selected for Essendon's elimination final against Fremantle, due to Sheedy stating that he had "little choice" but to select a youthful team for the match and that "it wouldn't worry [him]" to choose an inexperienced player. However, Sheedy elected not to play Hall in the match, instead selecting him as an emergency. Essendon won the match and moved on to the semi-final, where Hall was again an emergency. Essendon lost the semi-final and was eliminated from the finals series, ending the Bombers' season. Although he regularly pushed for selection in 2003 and finished equal second in Bendigo's best and fairest count, Hall was delisted by Essendon at season's end.

== Post-AFL career ==
After being delisted by the Bombers, Hall was pursued by multiple clubs; he had offers from VFL sides Coburg, the Tasmanian Devils, Williamstown and Bendigo, as well as South Australian National Football League (SANFL) club West Adelaide, before deciding to sign with Devils because he wanted to come home to family and friends. Hall started the 2004 season playing as a forward and, despite moving into the midfield by mid-season, he was still a regular goalkicker. In June he was named in the VFL representative squad to play against the West Australian Football League, but he missed out on the match due to a hip flexor injury that sidelined him for a month. Hall finished the home and away season in fifth place in The Mercury's Tasmanian Devils Player of the Year award and in equal third place in the Devils' best and fairest.

In 2005 Hall was among the best on the ground in an interstate match between the VFL and the SANFL, finished in third in the Devils' best and fairest count, and was runner up in The Mercury's Tasmanian Devils Player of the Year award. The 2006 season saw Hall named best on ground in his 100th VFL match, a 24-point win over Frankston. He was again runner up in The Mercury's Tasmanian Devils Player of the Year award and also finished as runner up in the team's best and fairest count. In 2007 journalist Matt Burgan, writing for the AFL website, named Hall in his best 22 players currently from Tasmania, with Hall and Cameron Thurley the only two players who were not listed with an AFL club at the time of selection. Hall was named in the Devils' leadership group at the beginning of the 2007 season. He represented Tasmania in an interstate match against Queensland and was awarded the Lefroy Medal as best on ground for the Tasmanians. Hall finished the year winning his first Tasmanian Devils Player of the Year award and coming third in the best and fairest.

After 134 matches and 109 goals in the VFL, Hall left the Devils at the end of the 2007 season, citing work and family reasons—his wife Lauren was expecting their first child in December 2007. He proceeded to rejoin North Hobart Football Club in the TFL for 2008. In his first year with the club Hall won the George Miller Medal, awarded to North Hobart's best and fairest player for the season. In 2009, he was described as North Hobart's "star player", represented the TFL in a match against the QAFL, and was his team's only representative in the top 10 of the Tassie Medal, awarded to the league's best and fairest player.

By 2010, Hall was the captain of North Hobart, and was one of only four players in the TFL to have senior AFL experience. Hall had another good season in 2010; he won his second George Miller Medal, and was described by his coach as one of the league's five best players and the "best tackler in the competition". Despite carrying a nagging ankle injury, Hall started the 2011 season well, with The Mercury's Brett Stubbs writing that he was arguably the second best player in the league. He missed five weeks during the middle of the season and, although he was named best on ground in his comeback match, Hall said that another injury would probably be the end of his career. He played out the rest of the season and finished in ninth place in the State League Player of the Year award, was named on the half-back flank in the TFL Team of the Year, and finished in the top 20 in the Tassie Medal count.

Hall retired from football at the end of the 2011 season; his coach at North Hobart described Hall as irreplaceable. He came out of retirement in 2013 to spend one season playing for St Virgil's Old Scholars in the Old Scholars Football Association, where he was also an assistant coach. Hall finished second in the league best and fairest in his solitary season for the club.
