= Nathan Saunders =

Australian rules footballer

Personal information
- Full name: Nathan Saunders
- Born: 22 July 1976 (age 50)
- Original team: Werribee (VFL)
- Draft: No. 3, 2002 Pre-season Draft

Playing career^{1}
Years	Club	Games (Goals)
2002	Western Bulldogs	10 (11)
- ^{1} Playing statistics correct to the end of 2012.

Nathan Saunders (born 22 July 1976) is a former Australian rules footballer who played with Western Bulldogs in the Australian Football League (AFL) in 2002.
