= Ben Kane (footballer) =

Australian footballer

Personal information
- Full name: Ben Kane
- Born: 22 March 1983 (age 43)
- Original team: Eastern Ranges (TAC Cup)
- Draft: No. 13, 2002 Rookie Draft

Playing career^{1}
| Years | Club | Games (Goals) |
| 2003–2006 | Hawthorn | 23 (1) |
- ^{1} Playing statistics correct to the end of 2012.

Ben Kane (born 22 March 1983) is a former Australian rules footballer who played with Hawthorn in the Australian Football League (AFL) between 2003 and 2006.
