= Djaran Whyman =

Australian rules footballer (born 1983)

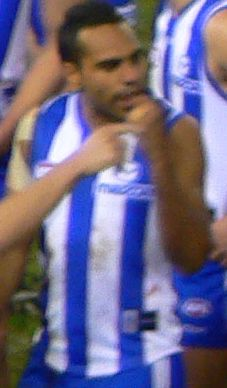

Personal information
- Born: 21 August 1983 (age 43)
- Original team: North Ballarat
- Debut: 2007, Kangaroos vs. Brisbane
- Height: 179 cm (5 ft 10 in)
- Weight: 77 kg (170 lb)

Playing career^{1}
Years	Club	Games (Goals)
2007	Kangaroos	3 (4)
- ^{1} Playing statistics correct to the end of 2007.

Djaran Whyman (born 21 August 1983) is an Australian rules footballer in the Australian Football League.

Whyman was first rookie listed by AFL club Hawthorn in 2002, but he returned to country football later that year.

Recruited by the Kangaroos Football Club in 2006 from the North Ballarat Football Club, the 179 cm, 77 kg small forward joined the club's rookie list.

He was promoted to the senior list in 2007, kicking 15 goals including bags of five and four for the Kangaroos affiliate club, North Ballarat, in the Victorian Football League.

Whyman featured in the reserves side's best on four occasions before making his senior debut against the Melbourne Demons at the Telstra Dome on 22 July in Round 16 where he kicked 2 goals and 2 behinds.

Whyman was delisted by the Kangaroos at the end of the 2007 season.
