= David Gallagher (Australian footballer) =

Australian rules footballer, born 1980

Personal information
- Born: 5 August 1980 (age 46); Thursday Island, Australia
- Original team: Prahran Dragons
- Debut: Round 1, 1999, Adelaide vs. Western Bulldogs, at Football Park

Playing career^{1}
Years	Club	Games (Goals)
1999–2001	Adelaide	26 (2)
2002	Carlton	7 (1)
Total		33 (3)
- ^{1} Playing statistics correct to the end of 2002.

Career highlights
- AFL Rising Star nominee: 1999; 3× VFL premiership player: 2004, 2005, 2006; Sandringham best and fairest: 2004, 2009; Sandringham captain: 2011

David Gallagher (born 5 August 1980) is an Australian rules footballer who has played in the Australian Football League and the Victorian Football League.

Gallagher was recruited from the Prahran Dragons in the TAC Cup to the Adelaide Football Club with the 32nd selection in the 1998 AFL draft. After playing 26 games over three seasons, including an AFL Rising Star nomination in 1999 he was traded to Carlton in return for Ben Nelson. He played in seven of the first nine games of the 2002 season, but did not play again in the AFL and was delisted.

After his AFL career, Gallagher has had a long and successful Victorian Football League (VFL) career with the Sandringham Football Club, playing more than 150 games between 2003 and 2011. He won consecutive premierships with the club in 2004, 2005 and 2006, twice won the best and fairest award, in 2004 and 2009, and was made club captain in 2011. However, immediately prior to the 2012 season, he became frustrated with the nature of Sandringham's reserves affiliation with AFL team St Kilda, and left the club. He returned to the VFL in 2013, signing with the Frankston Football Club.

== Sources ==
- Lovett, M. (ed.) (2005) AFL 2005, Australian Football League: Melbourne. ISBN 0 9580300 6 5.
