= Justin Crow =

Australian rules footballer

Personal information
- Full name: Justin Crow
- Born: 16 July 1983 (age 43)
- Original team: Doncaster / Oakleigh Chargers
- Height: 196 cm (6 ft 5 in)
- Weight: 92 kg (203 lb)

Playing career^{1}
| Years | Club | Games (Goals) |
| 2004 | Collingwood | 1 (0) |
- ^{1} Playing statistics correct to the end of 2004.

Career highlights
- Joseph Wren Memorial Trophy 2004, 2008

Justin Crow (born 16 July 1983) is a former Australian rules footballer who played with Collingwood in the Australian Football League (AFL).

Crow was recruited from the Oakleigh Chargers of the TAC Cup, but from Doncaster originally. In 2004 he made just one AFL appearance, in Collingwood's round 19 win over Fremantle at Subiaco Oval. He took two marks and had two kicks in the win. After leaving Collingwood he continued playing football with the Northern Bullants. Despite his minimal number of games for the senior team, Crow was the first Collingwood player to twice win the Joseph Wren Memorial Trophy for the best and fairest in the VFL team.

In 2013 Justin became the acting fitness coach at Essendon Football Club.

He is the son of Max Crow, who played for Essendon, St Kilda and Footscray.
