= Damon White =

Australian rules footballer and coach

Personal information
- Born: 16 August 1983 (age 43)
- Original team: Perth (WAFL)
- Debut: 16 May 2004, Port Adelaide vs. Kangaroos, at Telstra Dome
- Height: 193 cm (6 ft 4 in)
- Weight: 94 kg (207 lb)

Playing career^{1}
Years	Club	Games (Goals)
2004–2008	Port Adelaide	55 (47)
- ^{1} Playing statistics correct to the end of 2008.

Damon White (born 16 August 1983) is a former Australian Rules footballer, who played for the Port Adelaide Power in the AFL.

White was selected by the Power in the 2001 draft, being the 62nd overall pick.

White was delisted by the Power at the end of the 2008 season, and chose to not nominate for the AFL Draft, instead signing a four-year contract with North Adelaide in the SANFL.

White returned to his native Western Australia at the end of the 2010 SANFL season and was signed by his original WAFL club, the Perth Football Club. White played one game for Perth, however the impact of injuries throughout his career forced his retirement from all football commitments in June 2011.

In 2016, he was the playing coach of the Exmouth Eagles in the Gascoyne Football Association (in Western Australia's Mid-West region), guiding his side to a top of the ladder finish and a premiership from full-forward, winning the association goal kicking and Best on Ground in the Grand Final. He has played with the club since 2013.
