= Joel Reynolds =

Australian rules footballer (born 1984)

Personal information
- Born: 5 June 1984 (age 42)
- Original team: St Josephs (VCFL) / Geelong U18
- Debut: 2002, Essendon vs. Brisbane, at The Gabba
- Height: 188 cm (6 ft 2 in)
- Weight: 81 kg (179 lb)
- Position: Utility

Playing career^{1}
Years	Club	Games (Goals)
2002–2006	Essendon	38 (13)
2007	Geelong	0 (0)
- ^{1} Playing statistics correct to the end of 2007.

Joel Reynolds (born 5 June 1984) is a former Australian rules footballer. Reynolds is the grandson of Bomber legend Dick Reynolds. Reynolds was pick 31 in the 2001 draft, having played with the Geelong Falcons and St Josephs in the VCFL.

== AFL career ==
Joel Reynolds was a utility who played various roles that his coach Kevin Sheedy put him in. It took time for him to get up to speed with the highest level of the game. His second season was ruined due to osteitis pubis. Reynolds had injury affected seasons for the rest of his career in the AFL. In 2004 he caught glandular fever. He managed one game in 2005 thanks to an ankle reconstruction and stress fractures and he tore his hamstring early in 2006, but still managed to play eleven games that year.

At the conclusion of the 2006 season, and after five seasons and just 38 games for the Bombers, Reynolds was delisted and was picked up by Geelong in the pre-season rookie draft. He did not play in 2007 due to a bad knee injury and was eventually delisted at the end of the 2007 season.

== Post AFL ==
He moved to Western Australia in 2008 to play for East Perth where he played 19 games.

He also played in the EDFL 2011 Grand Final with the Strathmore Football Club where they beat Oak Park.

He is also a member Essendon Past Players Association committee.

== Statistics ==
Statistics are correct to end of 2007 Season

Season	Team	No.	Games	Goals	Behinds	Kicks	Marks	Handballs	Disposals
2002	Essendon	40	9	5	4	23	10	20	43
2003	Essendon	29	14	2	1	70	39	38	108
2004	Essendon	29	3	0	0	13	11	10	23
2005	Essendon	29	1	0	0	1	1	2	3
2006	Essendon	29	11	6	7	57	31	37	94
2007	Geelong	37	0	0	0	0	0	0	0
Totals			38	13	12	164	92	107	271
