= 2009 Brownlow Medal =

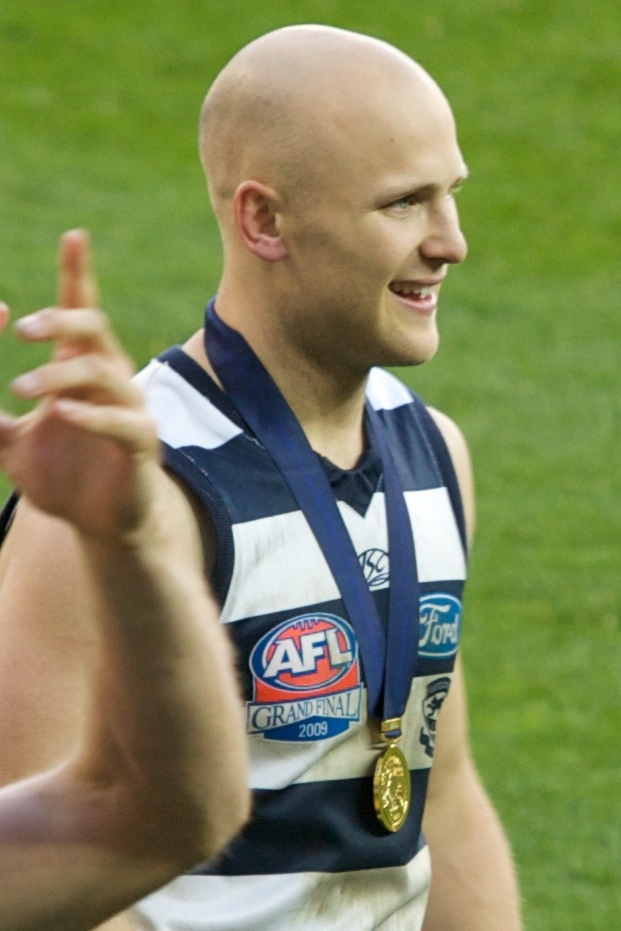
- 2009 Brownlow Medal winner Ablett Jr would go on to win the 2009 AFL Grand Final with Geelong later in the week.
- Date: 21 September
- Location: Crown Palladium
- Hosted by: Sandy Roberts
- Winner: Gary Ablett, Jr. (Geelong); 30 votes

Television/radio coverage
- Network: Seven Network

The 2009 Brownlow Medal was the 82nd year the award was presented to the player adjudged the fairest and best player during the Australian Football League (AFL) home-and-away season. Gary Ablett Jr of the Geelong Football Club won the medal by polling 30 votes during the 2009 AFL season.

Ablett won the award with thirty votes, eight votes ahead of 2004 medal winner, Chris Judd. It was Ablett's first Brownlow despite winning many other awards in the previous few years and being the Brownlow pre-count favourite for the previous three years. It was the second time in three years that a player from Geelong won the Brownlow Medal.

== Leading vote-getters ==
	Player	Votes
1st	Gary Ablett, Jr. (Geelong)	30
2nd	Chris Judd (Carlton)	22
3rd	Lenny Hayes (St Kilda)	20
=4th	Jonathan Brown (Brisbane); Simon Black (Brisbane)	19
=6th	Nick Dal Santo (St Kilda); Adam Goodes (Sydney)	17
8th	Joel Selwood (Geelong)	16
=9th	Bryce Gibbs (Carlton); Marc Murphy (Carlton); Nick Riewoldt (St Kilda)	15

== Ablett's victory ==
Gary Ablett's victory in the 2009 medal followed his sixth-place finish in 2007 and his third-place finish in 2008. In all three years he was the favourite to win the award. Ablett polled in 13 matches, including eight best-on-ground performances. His seventh best-on-ground performance in round 20 confirmed his victory, as his 26-vote tally at this point was seven votes ahead of Judd, Brown and Hayes, who were all equal on 19 votes with only six votes left from the remaining two rounds. During his acceptance speech, Ablett referred to his father, Australian Football Hall of Fame member Gary Ablett Sr., who, despite being considered one of the best footballers players of all time, never won a Brownlow medal.

I can at least say I've done something he hasn't done... I've always said I'd be happy to be half as good. He's the best player to play the game, in my opinion.

— Gary Ablett, Jr.

== Voting procedure ==
The three field umpires (those umpires who control the flow of the game, as opposed to goal or boundary umpires) confer after each match and award three votes, two votes, and one vote to the players they regard as the best, second-best and third-best in the match, respectively. The votes are kept secret until the awards night, and they are read and tallied on the evening.

=== Ineligible players ===
As the medal is awarded to the fairest and best player in the league, those who have been suspended during the season by the AFL Tribunal (or, who avoided suspension only because of a discount for a good record or an early guilty plea) are ineligible to win the award; however, they may still continue to poll votes. Sam Mitchell was the leading ineligible player after being found guilty of striking Adelaide's David Mackay. Chris Judd was suspended for an incident during the finals, but under the rules he remained eligible for both this year's and the 2010 medal, the latter of which he won.

- Jack Anthony (Collingwood)
- Jason Akermanis (Western Bulldogs)
- Chance Bateman (Hawthorn)
- Jared Brennan (Brisbane Lions)
- Dean Brogan (Port Adelaide)
- Domenic Cassisi (Port Adelaide)
- Joel Corey (Geelong)
- Trent Cotchin (Richmond)
- Lance Franklin (Hawthorn)
- Michael Gardiner (St Kilda)
- Barry Hall (Sydney)
- Daniel Kerr (West Coast)
- Justin Koschitzke (St Kilda)
- Cameron Ling (Geelong)
- Matthew Lloyd (Essendon)
- Nick Maxwell (Collingwood)
- Adam McPhee (Essendon)
- Sam Mitchell (Hawthorn)
- Cameron Mooney (Geelong)
- Drew Petrie (North Melbourne)
- Jack Riewoldt (Richmond)
- Patrick Ryder (Essendon)
- Heath Shaw (Collingwood)
- Kade Simpson (Carlton)
- Colin Sylvia (Melbourne)
  - Source:

=== Pre-count favourites ===
Gary Ablett started the year as the favourite to win the medal with both the bookmakers and in a poll of all 16 AFL captains. He remained as favourite throughout the year and entered the count as the leading contender for the third consecutive year. Other leading contenders included Dane Swan and St Kilda midfielders Leigh Montagna, Nick Dal Santo and Lenny Hayes.

== Event ==
For the first time, the red carpet was change to a blue carpet, to celebrate the release of the new Toyota Prius. The carpet arrivals were hosted by Fifi Box and Hawthorn's Brad Sewell.

The poor behaviour of Carlton full-forward and The Footy Show panellist Brendan Fevola became a talking point of the event. Fevola was heavily intoxicated at the function, including while on camera, and he verbally abused and personally attacked guests, gave his opinion on Brownlow votes, knocked a bottle of beer out of the hand of 2008 Brownlow Medallist Adam Cooney, vomited and urinated on Casino fixtures, simulated sex acts, sexually harassed unsuspecting female guests and bystanders, sang a cappella on stage at the Brownlow afterparty, and fought with a Channel 7 journalist and Crown security staff before being removed from the complex by his teammates.

Fevola was fined $10,000 by the AFL for his actions: he was also fired from the Grand Final edition of The Footy Show and voluntarily withdrew from the Coleman Medallist's lap of honour at the 2009 AFL Grand Final.
