= 2007 Brownlow Medal =

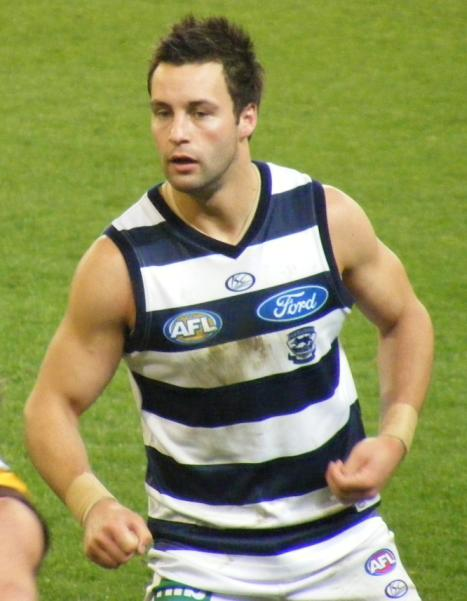
- 2007 Brownlow Medallist, Jimmy Bartel
- Date: 24 September
- Location: Crown Palladium
- Hosted by: Bruce McAvaney
- Winner: Jimmy Bartel (Geelong); 29 votes

Television/radio coverage
- Network: Seven Network

The 2007 Brownlow Medal was the 80th year the award was presented to the player adjudged the fairest and best player during the Australian Football League (AFL) home and away season. Jimmy Bartel of the Geelong Football Club won the medal by polling twenty-nine votes during the 2007 AFL season.

== Leading vote-getters ==
Jimmy Bartel won by seven votes despite missing the final two games after having an appendectomy. Geelong polled the most votes of all teams with 108 total votes, although Port Adelaide, Sydney and Brisbane also had 16 players receive votes. Chris Judd was the early leader, setting the record for polling votes in the most consecutive games with votes in the first eight games, before not receiving another vote for the remainder of the season.

	Player	Votes
1st	Jimmy Bartel (Geelong)	29
=2nd	Simon Black (Brisbane)	22
=2nd	Brent Harvey (Kangaroos)	22
	Daniel Kerr (West Coast)*	22
4th	Sam Mitchell (Hawthorn)	21
=5th	Gary Ablett, Jr. (Geelong)	20
=5th	Dane Swan (Collingwood)	20
	Adam Goodes (Sydney)*	20
7th	Scott Thompson (Adelaide)	18
8th	Jonathan Brown (Brisbane)	17
=9th	Nick Dal Santo (St Kilda)	16
=9th	Luke Hodge (Hawthorn)	16
=9th	Chris Judd (West Coast)	16
	Shaun Burgoyne (Port Adelaide)*	16

* The player was ineligible to win the medal due to suspension by the AFL Tribunal during the year.

== Voting procedure ==
The three field umpires (those umpires who control the flow of the game, as opposed to goal or boundary umpires) confer after each match and award three votes, two votes, and one vote to the players they regard as the best, second-best and third-best in the match, respectively. The votes are kept secret until the awards night, and they are read and tallied on the evening.

=== Ineligible players ===
As the medal is awarded to the fairest and best player in the league, those who have been suspended during the season by the AFL Tribunal (or, who avoided suspension only because of a discount for a good record or an early guilty plea) are ineligible to win the award; however, they may still continue to poll votes. This caused some confusion, as with the points system in use, a player can be ineligible if they were found guilty, but due to points discounts from a previous good record or guilty plea, they were not actually suspended during the year. In the weeks before the count it was discovered that Brett Kirk was ineligible due to a guilty plea in round 8, but remained active in the betting markets for the remainder of the season.

- Heath Black (Fremantle)
- Nathan Bock (Adelaide)
- Amon Buchanan (Sydney)
- Shaun Burgoyne (Port Adelaide)
- Josh Carr (Fremantle)
- Adam Cooney (Western Bulldogs)
- Ryan Crowley (Fremantle)
- Aaron Davey (Melbourne)
- Ben Dixon (Hawthorn)
- Nathan Eagleton (Western Bulldogs)
- Dustin Fletcher (Essendon)
- Fraser Gehrig (St Kilda)
- Adam Goodes (Sydney)
- Ben Holland (Melbourne)
- Rhan Hooper (Brisbane Lions)
- Ben Johnson (Collingwood)
- Daniel Kerr (West Coast)
- Brett Kirk (Sydney)
- Anthony Rocca (Collingwood)
- Jason Roe (Brisbane Lions)
- Dean Solomon (Fremantle)
- Colin Sylvia (Melbourne)
- Damon White (Port Adelaide)
- Lance Whitnall (Carlton)
- Michael Wilson (Port Adelaide)
