= McClelland Trophy =

Trophy in Australian rule football

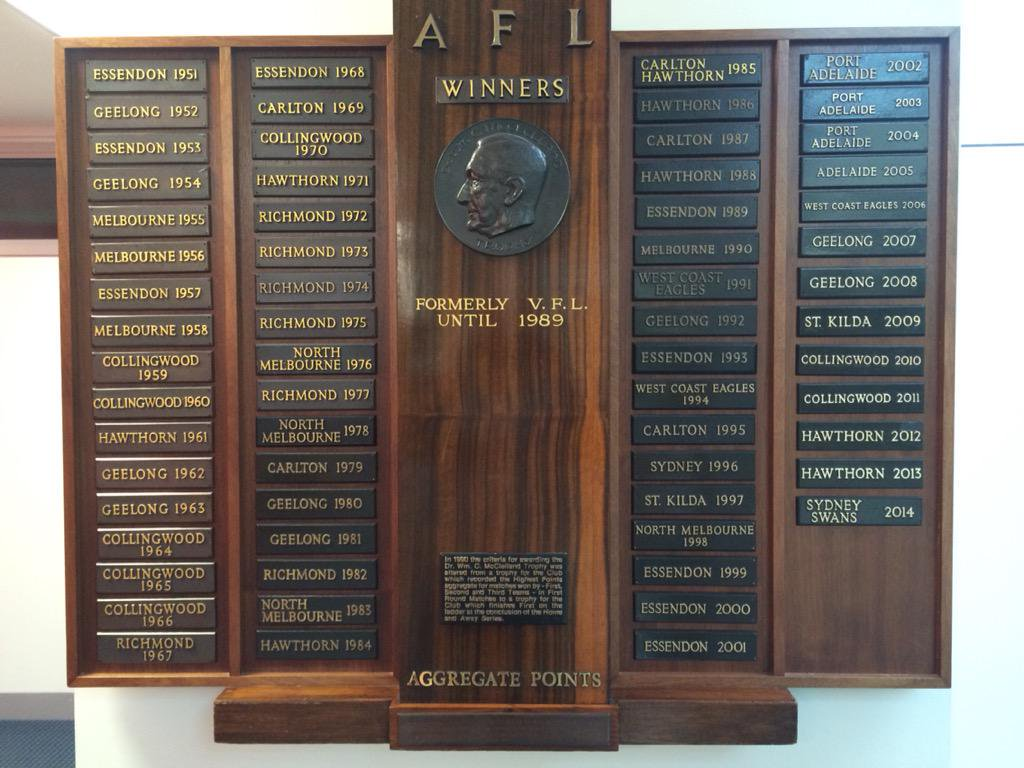
The McClelland Trophy at AFL House in 2015

The McClelland Trophy is an Australian rules football club championship trophy, awarded each year to the club with the best aggregate performance across the Australian Football League (AFL) and AFL Women's (AFLW) seasons.

The trophy was inaugurated in 1951. From 1951 to 1990, it was a club championship award presented to the club with the highest aggregate performance across the three grades of competition that were sanctioned by the VFL/AFL – seniors, reserves, and under-19s – with senior wins carrying a higher value.

By 1991, three interstate clubs had joined the AFL seniors without competing in the minor grades. As the under-19s competition was shut down at the end of that season, the club championship format was discontinued. From 1991 to 2022, the trophy was presented to the minor premiers, i.e. the club that finished the AFL home-and-away season on top of the ladder.

In 2022, the expansion of the AFL Women's competition meant that all AFL clubs now fielded a men's and a women's team. Thus, from 2023, the club championship format returned, based on the men's and women's seasons with roughly equal weightings. The trophy is now accompanied by $1 million in prize money, to be shared equally among the club and its AFL and AFLW players.

Teams that win the trophy are given a simplified replica of the middle panel of the perpetual trophy, which features the AFL lettering and a round die-cast of McClelland.

== History ==
The award was instituted in 1951 and is named in honour of Dr. William C. McClelland, who at that time had reached 25 years' service as President of the Victorian Football League. He had previously played 91 games for Melbourne in the VFA in 1894 and in the VFL from 1898–1904, playing in its 1900 premiership team, and captaining the club in 1901–1904. After retiring as a player, he served as a club delegate in 1905–1911, and then as club president from 1912–1926 (when he resigned to become VFL President).

=== 1951–1990: Original three-grade format ===
From 1951–1990, the trophy was a club championship, presented to the club with the highest aggregate points across the three levels of VFL/AFL competition: seniors (firsts), reserves (seconds) and under-19s (thirds). The points system in 1951–1953 had five points being awarded for a win in the firsts, three points for a win in the seconds, and one point for a win in the thirds. In the event of a drawn match, each team received half of the points, with only home-and-away matches counting towards the trophy.

In 1954, the points system was amended, weighting results slightly more in favour of senior success: seniors wins were now worth ten points, with reserves wins being worth four points and under-19s wins being worth two points.

The 1985 season was the only time that there were joint winners of the McClelland Trophy, with Hawthorn and Carlton both finishing the home-and-away season with 228 points. Hawthorn was originally declared the winners via countback, which separated the two clubs by just 0.5% (or less than five goals) over the course of the entire season. However, less than a week later, the VFL rescinded this decision after it was discovered that the McClelland Trophy followed the rules of the Brownlow Medal, which had removed its countback system five years earlier: consequently, the Hawks and Blues were declared joint winners.

The countback system was used for the McClelland Trophy once, in 1954, after Geelong and Melbourne finished tied on points: Geelong were declared the winners by virtue of having a higher percentage in the seniors.

==== Interstate award ====
In 1957, a unrelated trophy of the same name was struck to reward the best Victorian player in interstate matches played against South Australia. The inaugural winner was Peter Pianto, and evidence of the award being presented continued up until at least 1965, when Footscray defender David Darcy was awarded the trophy.

=== 1991–2022: Dissolution of minor grades, trophy awarded to minor premiers ===
With the VFL's interstate expansion from 1987 and rebranding as the AFL, the three-grade format became problematic. While Sydney had continued to field teams in all three grades following the club's relocation from South Melbourne in 1982, Brisbane had fielded a reserves team from 1989 but not an Under-19s team, whereas WAFL and SANFL officials rejected VFL/AFL proposals for West Coast and Adelaide to field teams in the reserves and under-19s.

Subsequently, the AFL announced that the under-19s competition would be shut down at the end of the 1991 season, to be replaced with a new Victorian under-18s competition (the TAC Cup) featuring teams that were unaffiliated with the AFL clubs. Consequently, the club championship format was discontinued, and from 1991–2022, the McClelland Trophy was awarded to the team finishing on top of the AFL ladder at the end of the home-and-away season, thus becoming an award for the senior minor premiership.

The reserves competition was ultimately shut down at the end of the 1999 season.

=== 2023 onwards: AFL and AFLW combined champion club ===
From 2023, the trophy has been a club championship incorporating the results from the AFL and AFL Women's (AFLW) competitions, thus bringing an end to its 1991 format. This followed the expansion of the AFL Women's in 2022 season 7, which for the first time saw all clubs field a team in both the men's and women's competitions.

In 2023 and 2024, the trophy was won by the club with the highest aggregate points across the home-and-away seasons of both competitions, similar to the 1951–1990 format. The points system was four points for an AFL win and eight points for an AFLW win, with half points for draws; this reflected the AFLW's shorter season length and meant that the men's and women's seasons would have approximately equal weightings. Ties would be decided on aggregate highest percentage over both the AFL and AFLW.

The current points system was adopted in 2025. Each club is assigned a ranking score from 1 to 18 in reverse order based on finishing position after finals: i.e. the premiers receive 18 points, the runners-up receive 17 points, etc., down to the team finishing 18th receiving one point, and the highest combined ranking score wins the trophy. The points system from 2023–24 is applied to break any ties, followed by aggregate percentage.

The winners since 2023 are awarded $1 million prizemoney: $500,000 goes to the winning club, with $250,000 being split among that club's AFL players ($6250 per player), and $250,000 being split among that club's AFLW players ($8333 per player).

== The trophy ==
The trophy is a perpetual shield that is kept at AFL House. The original trophy features McClelland's head embossed in bronze on the centre of five panels of wood, where the names of each winning club is inscribed over the years. Clubs also receive a smaller one-panel replica of the trophy.

When the trophy format was changed to an AFL/AFLW Champion Club Trophy in 2023, the trophy was redesigned entirely. The new design consists of a glass plate in the shape of a typical Australian rules football, with the logos of both the AFL and AFLW competitions in the centre: on the side of the panel it is inscribed the words "Dr. WM C McClelland Trophy", and the base plate has the names of the winning clubs. The new trophy was presented at the AFLW Awards night in 2023.

It was altered once again in 2024 to a more traditional trophy design. A cylinder shaped silver trophy, with shapes of players between the base of the trophy and the bottom of the cylinder. On the base plate it has both AFL & AFLW logos on opposite sides and the words "Dr. WM C McClelland Trophy" and below is the name of the club who wins the trophy and the year won, first presented to the Hawthorn Football Club.

== Significance ==
The award has been relatively low-key, with no prize money until 2023, although in recent seasons there had been a private presentation to clubs released in video format on websites.

From 1901 until 1990, there was no trophy for the team that qualified for the finals in first position as minor premiers, even though winning the minor premiership did come with some prestige: finishing on first on the ladder at the end of the home-and-away season ensured an advantageous draw in the AFL finals series, and is also part of the official records.

== List of winners ==
=== 1951–1990: Three-grade format ===
Year	Winner
1951	Essendon
1952	Geelong
1953	Essendon
1954	Geelong
1955	Melbourne
1956	Melbourne
1957	Essendon
1958	Melbourne
1959	Collingwood
1960	Collingwood
1961	Hawthorn
1962	Geelong
1963	Geelong
1964	Collingwood
1965	Collingwood
1966	Collingwood
1967	Richmond
1968	Essendon
1969	Carlton
1970	Collingwood
1971	Hawthorn
1972	Richmond
1973	Richmond
1974	Richmond
1975	Richmond
1976	North Melbourne
1977	Richmond
1978	North Melbourne
1979	Carlton
1980	Geelong
1981	Geelong
1982	Richmond
1983	North Melbourne
1984	Hawthorn
1985	Carlton
1985	Hawthorn
1986	Hawthorn
1987	Carlton
1988	Hawthorn
1989	Essendon
1990	Melbourne

=== 1991–2022: AFL minor premiers ===
Year	Winner
1991	West Coast
1992	Geelong
1993	Essendon
1994	West Coast
1995	Carlton
1996	Sydney
1997	St Kilda
1998	North Melbourne
1999	Essendon
2000	Essendon
2001	Essendon
2002	Port Adelaide
2003	Port Adelaide
2004	Port Adelaide
2005	Adelaide
2006	West Coast
2007	Geelong
2008	Geelong
2009	St Kilda
2010	Collingwood
2011	Collingwood
2012	Hawthorn
2013	Hawthorn
2014	Sydney
2015	Fremantle
2016	Sydney
2017	Adelaide
2018	Richmond
2019	Geelong
2020	Port Adelaide
2021	Melbourne
2022	Geelong

=== 2023–present: AFL & AFLW Combined Champion Club ===
McClelland Trophy (2023 onwards)
Season	Club	Points	AFL points	AFLW points
2023	Melbourne	128	64	64
2024	Hawthorn	136	56	80
2025	Brisbane Lions	35	18	17
2026	Sydney	31	16	15

== Trophy winners ==
=== Overall ===
Team	Wins	Last win
Adelaide	2	2017
Brisbane Lions	1	2025
Carlton	5	1995
Collingwood	8	2011
Essendon	9	2001
Fitzroy	0	N/A
Footscray/Western Bulldogs	0	Never
Fremantle	1	2015
Geelong	11	2022
Gold Coast	0	Never
Greater Western Sydney	0	Never
Hawthorn	9	2024
Melbourne	5	2023
North Melbourne	4	1998
Port Adelaide	4	2020
Richmond	8	2018
St Kilda	2	2009
Sydney	4	2026
West Coast	3	2006

=== 1951–1990: Three-grade format ===
Team	Wins	Last win
Carlton	4	1987
Collingwood	6	1970
Essendon	5	1989
Fitzroy	0	Never
Footscray	0	Never
Geelong	6	1981
Hawthorn	6	1988
Melbourne	4	1990
North Melbourne	3	1983
Richmond	7	1982
St Kilda	0	Never
South Melbourne/Sydney	0	Never

- Brisbane and West Coast (who entered the VFL/AFL in 1987) are excluded from this table as they did not field a team in all three grades in 1987–1990.
- Richmond won the trophy four times in succession in 1972–1975, the most consecutive of any club, and also won all three grades' premierships in 1973, the only club to accomplish the feat during this period.
- Collingwood (1964–1966) and Hawthorn (1984–1986, including 1985 tied) both won the trophy three times in succession.
- Thirteen of these 41 McClelland Trophy winners (1985 was a tie between Hawthorn and Carlton) went on to win the senior premiership in the same year.
- 20 of these 41 McClelland Trophy winners also won the senior minor premiership in the same year.

=== 1991–2022: AFL minor premiers ===
Team	Wins	Last win
Adelaide	2	2017
Brisbane	0	Never
Carlton	1	1995
Collingwood	2	2011
Essendon	4	2001
Fitzroy	0	N/A
Footscray/Western Bulldogs	0	Never
Fremantle	1	2015
Geelong	5	2022
Gold Coast	0	Never
Greater Western Sydney	0	Never
Hawthorn	2	2013
Melbourne	1	2021
North Melbourne	1	1998
Port Adelaide	4	2020
Richmond	1	2018
St Kilda	2	2009
Sydney	3	2016
West Coast	3	2006

- Essendon (1999–2001) and Port Adelaide (2002–2004) each won the trophy three years in succession.
- Eleven of these 32 McClelland Trophy winners went on to win the AFL premiership in the same year.

=== 2023–present: AFL and AFLW combined champion club ===
Team	Wins	Last win
Melbourne	1	2023
Hawthorn	1	2024
Brisbane Lions	1	2025
Sydney	1	2026

== See also ==
- List of AFL premiers
- List of AFL minor premiers
- List of AFL Women's premiers
- List of AFL Women's minor premiers
