= 2004 Brownlow Medal =

- Date: 20 September
- Location: Crown Palladium
- Hosted by: Stephen Quartermain
- Winner: Chris Judd (West Coast); 30 votes

Television/radio coverage
- Network: Network Ten

The 2004 Brownlow Medal was the 77th year the award was presented to the player adjudged the fairest and best player during the Australian Football League (AFL) home-and-away season. Chris Judd of the West Coast Eagles won the medal by polling thirty votes during the 2004 AFL season.

== Leading vote-getters ==
	Player	Votes
1st	Chris Judd (West Coast)	30
2nd	Mark Ricciuto (Adelaide)	23
3rd	Chad Cornes (Port Adelaide)	22
=4th	Scott West (Western Bulldogs)	20
=4th	Brett Kirk (Sydney)	20
6th	Simon Black (Brisbane)	18
=7th	Luke Power (Brisbane)	17
=7th	Nick Riewoldt (St Kilda)	17
=7th	Nigel Lappin (Brisbane)	17
=10th	Jeff White (Melbourne)	15
=10th	Warren Tredrea (Port Adelaide)	15

== Voting procedure ==
The three field umpires (those umpires who control the flow of the game, as opposed to goal or boundary umpires) confer after each match and award three votes, two votes, and one vote to the players they regard as the best, second-best and third-best in the match, respectively. The votes are kept secret until the awards night, and they are read and tallied on the evening.

As the medal is awarded to the fairest and best player in the league, those who have been suspended during the season by the AFL Tribunal (or, who avoided suspension only because of a discount for a good record or an early guilty plea) are ineligible to win the award; however, they may still continue to poll votes.
