= 2010 Brownlow Medal =

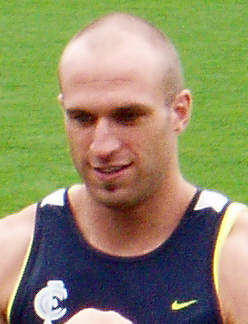
- 2010 Brownlow Medallist, Chris Judd
- Date: 20 September
- Location: Crown Palladium
- Hosted by: Stephen Quartermain
- Winner: Chris Judd (Carlton); 30 votes

Television/radio coverage
- Network: Network Ten, One

The 2010 Brownlow Medal was the 83rd year the award was presented to the player adjudged the fairest and best player during the Australian Football League (AFL) home and away season. Chris Judd of the Carlton Football Club won the medal by polling thirty votes during the 2010 AFL season. It was broadcast on Channel Ten and, for the first time, simultaneously on One live and nationally.

== Leading vote-getters ==
	Player	Votes
1st	Chris Judd (Carlton)	30
2nd	Gary Ablett (Geelong)	26
3rd	Dane Swan (Collingwood)	24
=4th	Scott Pendlebury (Collingwood)	21
=4th	Joel Selwood (Geelong)	21
=6th	Matthew Boyd (Western Bulldogs)	20
=6th	Aaron Sandilands (Fremantle)	20
8th	Lenny Hayes (St Kilda)	19
=9th	Travis Boak (Port Adelaide)	16
=9th	Luke Hodge (Hawthorn)	16
=9th	Leigh Montagna (St Kilda)	16
=9th	Jobe Watson (Essendon)	16

== Voting procedure ==
The three field umpires (those umpires who control the flow of the game, as opposed to goal or boundary umpires) confer after each match and award three votes, two votes, and one vote to the players they regard as the best, second-best and third-best in the match, respectively. The votes are kept secret until the awards night, and they are read and tallied on the evening.

=== Ineligible players ===
As the medal is awarded to the fairest and best player in the league, those who have been suspended during the season by the AFL Tribunal (or, who avoided suspension only because of a discount for a good record or an early guilty plea) are ineligible to win the award; however, they may still continue to poll votes. Some Australian rules football journalists argued that Judd was lucky to escape any AFL Tribunal action following an incident involving Fremantle's Matthew Pavlich in round 13, where Judd elbowed Pavlich in the face. Additionally, Judd served a three-match suspension at the start of the 2010 season, but because the incident for which he was suspended took place during the 2009 finals, this did not affect his eligibility.
