= Liam Baker =

Australian rules footballer (born 1998)

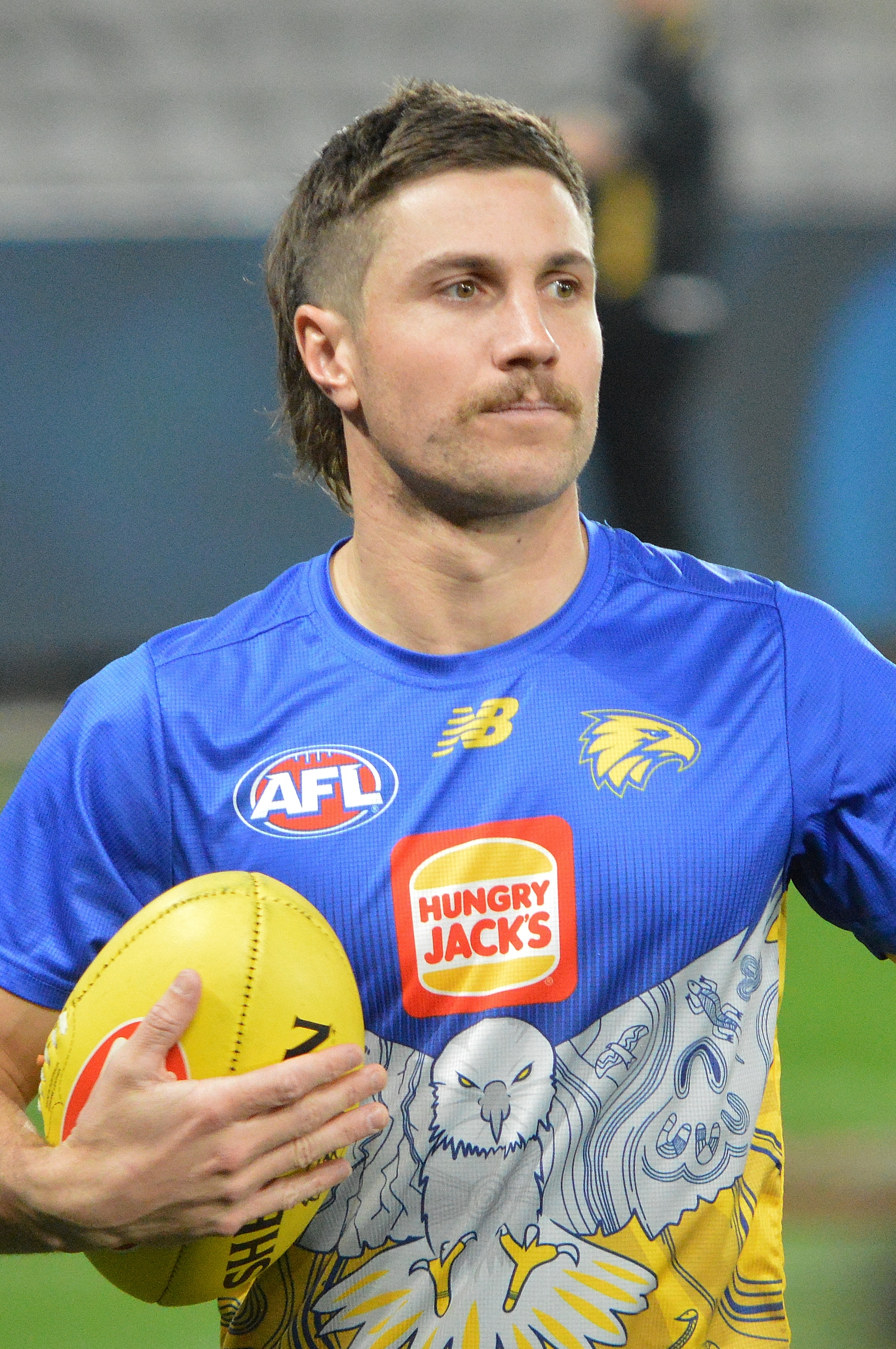
- Baker with West Coast in May 2026

Personal information
- Nickname: Bakes
- Born: 27 January 1998 (age 28)
- Original team: Subiaco (WAFL)
- Draft: No. 18, 2018 AFL rookie draft: Richmond
- Debut: Round 19, 2018, Richmond vs. Collingwood, at MCG
- Height: 173 cm (5 ft 8 in)
- Weight: 69 kg (152 lb)
- Position: Defender / midfielder

Club information
- Current club: West Coast
- Number: 3

Playing career^{1}
Years	Club	Games (Goals)
2018–2024	Richmond	128 (54)
2025–	West Coast	43 (13)
Total		171 (67)

Representative team honours
Years	Team	Games (Goals)
2026	Western Australia	1 (0)
- ^{1} Playing statistics correct to the end of 2026.

Career highlights
- 2× AFL premiership player: 2019, 2020; West Coast captain: 2026–; John Worsfold Medal: 2025; AFL Rising Star nominee: 2019; Robert Rose Award: 2022; 22under22 team: 2020; Richmond Life Member: 2019

Liam Baker (born 27 January 1998) is a professional Australian rules footballer playing for the West Coast Eagles in the Australian Football League (AFL). He played junior representative football with West Perth in the WAFL and represented Western Australia at national championships at under 18 level. After being undrafted in 2016, Baker then played senior WAFL football with Subiaco. Baker was drafted by Richmond in the 2018 rookie draft and made his AFL debut in round 19, 2018. He was an AFL premiership player with Richmond in 2019 and 2020, and in 2020 was named to the AFL's 22Under22 team, recognising the best young players in the league.

== Early life, junior and state-league football ==
Baker grew up on a wheat and sheep farm in Pingaring, Western Australia, a town 341 kilometres (212 mi) east of Perth. He took up junior football with the semi-local Lake Grace-Pingrup Football Club in the Ongerup Football Association, traveling more than 60 kilometres (37 mi) to do so. In 2014 he received the best and fairest award for the Great Southern Colts carnival that June.

He later played representative football in Perth as a junior with the colts program of WAFL club West Perth. While in Perth he attended high school at Aquinas College. In 2016 Baker represented Western Australia at the 2016 AFL Under 18 Championships. There he averaged 17.7 disposals and a goal per game across three matches. Following that season Baker was one of just 12 Western Australians and 80 young players across the country to be invited to the national draft combine in Melbourne in October. At the combine he placed equal-second overall in the goal-kicking test and seventh in the endurance running beep test. Baker was passed over in national, pre-season and rookie drafts that year, before making a switch to play senior football with rival WAFL club Subiaco in 2017.

At the time he recognised the need to improve physically, citing poor sprint testing at the national combine as a factor in his failure to be drafted. In addition, he worked on improving his inconsistent kicking caused by a bad ball-drop technique and a lack of positional versatility that saw him play exclusively as an inside midfielder. Improvements in these areas saw Baker break into the club's senior side while playing predominantly as a small forward. In just his second senior match he played a key role with three goals in a win over Swan Districts. In his side's preliminary final Baker also contributed three goals. He played a total of 13 matches at senior level including a "shining" performance in Subiaco's losing grand final in which he recorded 19 disposals, six inside-50s and five tackles. Baker kicked 19 goals that season and held averages of 16 disposals and three tackles per game. At the state draft combine that year he placed third in the endurance running yo-yo test. Despite his efforts Baker was again undrafted in that year's national and pre-season drafts.

=== Junior statistics ===
Legend
G	Goals	K	Kicks	D	Disposals	T	Tackles
B	Behinds	H	Handballs	M	Marks

Under 18 National Championships

Season	Team	No.	Games	Totals							Averages (per game)						
Season	Team	No.	Games	G	B	K	H	D	M	T	G	B	K	H	D	M	T
2016	Western Australia	2	3	3	—	32	21	52	14	8	1.0	—	10.7	7.0	17.3	4.7	2.7
Career			3	3	—	32	21	52	14	8	1.0	—	10.7	7.0	17.3	4.7	2.7

== AFL career ==
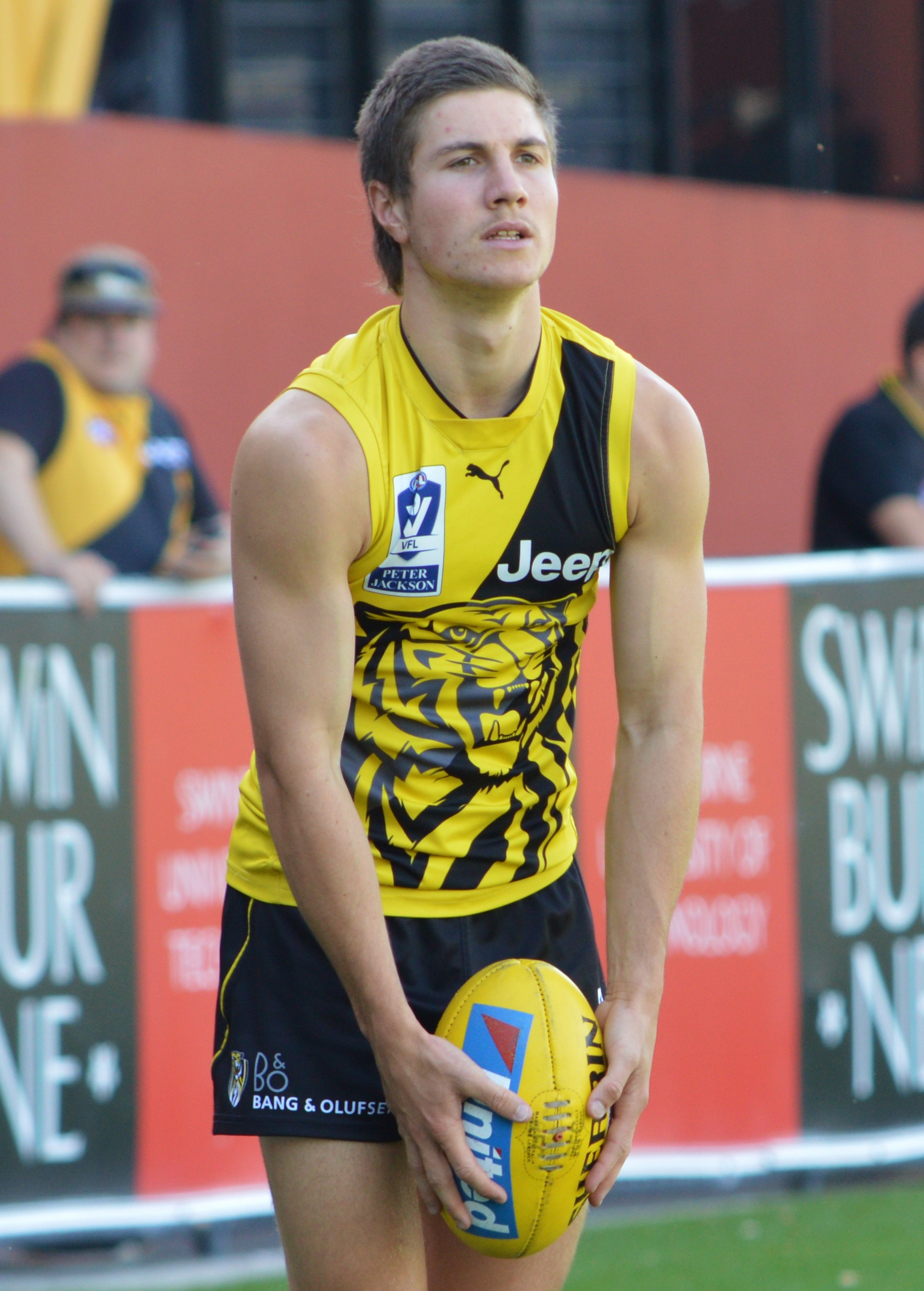
Baker with Richmond's VFL team in March 2018

=== 2018 season ===
Baker was drafted by Richmond with the club's first pick and the 18th selection overall in the 2018 AFL rookie draft in November 2017.

He made his first appearance for the club in a series of AFLX exhibition matches in February 2018. Baker did not play in any of the club's pre-season matches however, nor did he earn senior selection in the early part of the home and away season. Instead, he spent the beginning of his debut year developing with the club's reserves side in the VFL. Baker's first starring performance at that level came in a midfield role in early May, when he recorded 24 disposals and four clearances against Footscray. The following week he added another 23 disposals and a goal in a win over the North Melbourne reserves. By early July Baker came into contention for senior selection and even traveled with the team to Sydney as an emergency in round 17. The following week he was played in a forward-line role at the lower level and recorded 19 disposals along with an equal-game high three goals. Baker earned an AFL debut on the back of the performance, turning in 12 disposals, five score involvements and two behinds in his side's round 19 win over Collingwood at the MCG. He held his senior spot the following week, adding 14 disposals and another two behinds before being omitted from the club's round 21 side to face Gold Coast. He earned a third match in four weeks though when he was immediately recalled for the club's round 22 match against Essendon. There he kicked his first career goal but managed only a season-low eight disposals. A second senior omission followed, with Baker confined to VFL football for the remainder of the year. In the club's first VFL final he turned in a lively performance, recording 21 disposals in a qualifying final loss to Williamstown. Baker was cited for rough contact in that match however, after he bumped Williamstown defender Peter Faulks underneath a marking contest. He accepted a one match suspension for the act and subsequently missed the club's losing semi-final against Essendon that saw the VFL side eliminated from the finals series. Baker finished the year having kicked one goal in three games at senior level while also kicking 13 goals in 14 games with the reserves side in the VFL.

=== 2019 season ===
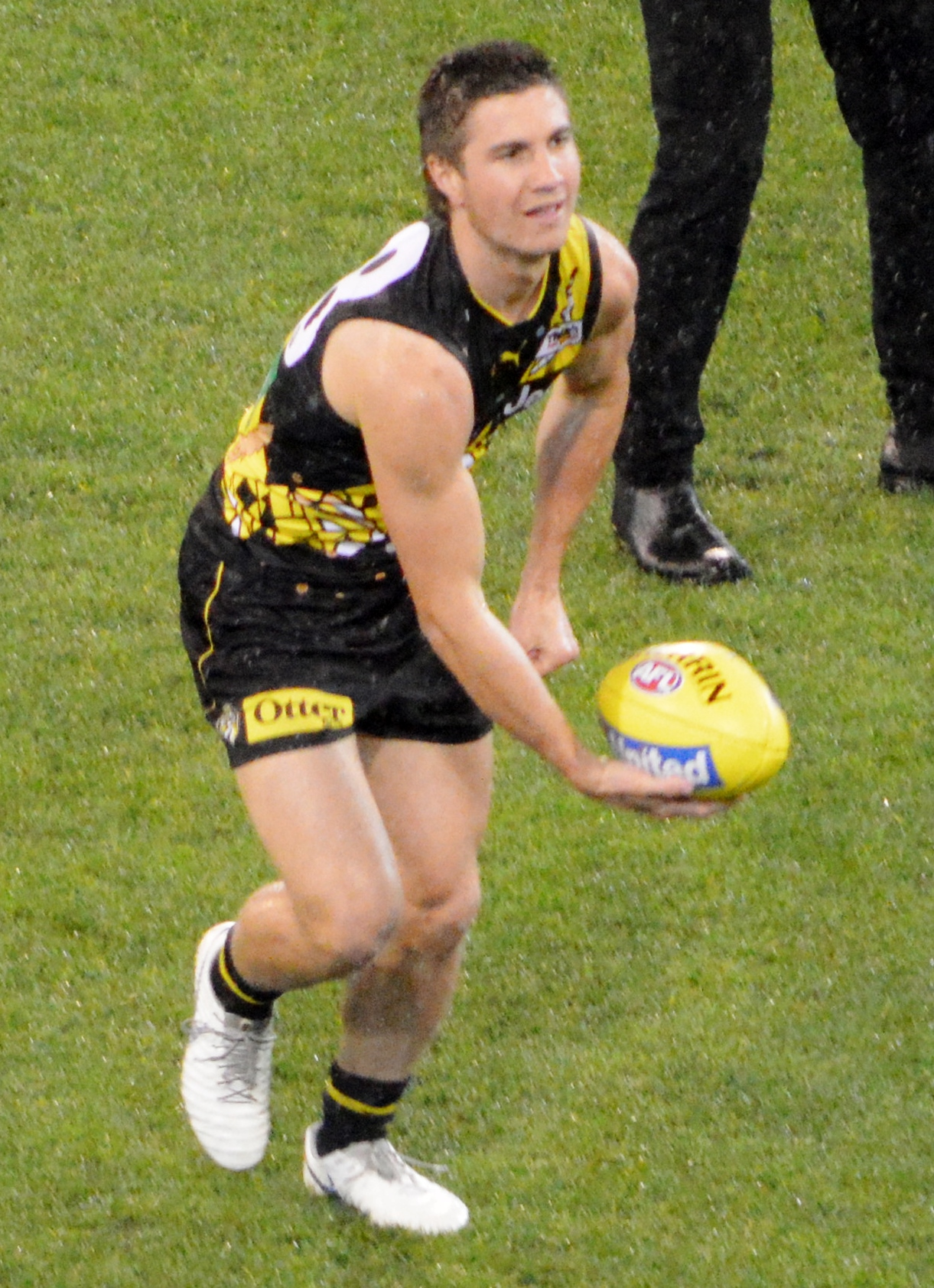
Baker during the pre-game warm up in round 10, 2019

After signing a contract extension to remain at Richmond on a rookie contract in 2019, Baker started the year in contention for senior selection with appearances in each of the club's two pre-season matches. He could not earn AFL selection come the start of the home and away season however, instead starting his season with practice matches with the club's reserves side in the VFL. Baker was a travelling emergency in round 3 of the AFL season, before injuries to Dustin Martin and Trent Cotchin saw him earn selection for the club's round 4 match against Port Adelaide at the Adelaide Oval. He kicked a goal and recorded 17 disposals in that win, before setting a new career-best with 21 disposals in a dual role as a midfielder and a forward the following week against Sydney. Baker's run of form continued when he was among his side's best in round 6, tallying 19 disposals along with two goals. At that point he was statistically the club's number one ranked player for chasing and corralling that season. In the marquee Dreamtime at the 'G match in round 10, Baker set new career bests with 24 disposals, nine tackles and five inside-50s and received a nomination for Mark of the Year for a diving mark while running with the flight of the ball. For that performance he also received a nomination for the league's Rising Star award. Baker went goalless over the following three matches, seeing him dropped back to VFL level in the last week of June. He was named an AFL emergency that week and played well as a forward in the lower league with 18 disposals and one goal. Baker was moved into a backline role in the VFL the following week after a teammate suffered an injury mid-match. He was exceptional as a defender, collecting a match-high 29 disposals along with eight marks and six tackles in what the club website labelled his best performance at any level in his two seasons at the club. Following another strong output as a VFL defender with 21 disposals the next week, Baker was recalled to AFL level for round 18 where he had a game-high nine intercepts and recorded 20 disposals in a win over Port Adelaide. He held his spot over the final five matches of the home and away season before contributing 16 disposals in a qualifying final victory over the Brisbane Lions at The Gabba In a home preliminary final against Geelong a fortnight later, Baker matched up with opposition forward Gryan Miers while recording 18 disposals as Richmond won through to a grand final match up against Greater Western Sydney. In the grand final, Baker was part of the Richmond defence that kept the Giants to 25 points, their lowest score in the club's eight-year history and the lowest score by any team in a VFL/AFL grand final since 1960. He recorded 12 disposals and spent parts of the match defending Giants forwards Brent Daniels and Toby Greene, both of whom went goalless for the match. Along with winning the AFL premiership, Baker finished the 2019 season by placing ninth in the final tally for the AFL Rising Star award and equal 13th in the club's best and fairest count.

=== 2020 season ===
Baker switched guernsey numbers in the 2019/20 off-season, taking the number seven from departing forward Dan Butler as well as receiving a Richmond life membership for his part in the previous season's premiership. After initially being named by AFL Media as a candidate to fall out of the club's best 22, the mid-December retirement of fellow defender Alex Rance saw Baker increasingly likely to retain his spot in the Richmond backline. Despite this opportunity opening up, Baker instead spent the summer months training in the wing position opened up by the free agent departure of Brandon Ellis. He starred in that position during the pre-season series, including with a team-high 30 disposals in a practice match loss to Collingwood. Baker recorded 16 disposals in a round 1 win over Carlton when the home and away season began, but under extraordinary conditions imposed on the league as a result of the rapid progression of the coronavirus pandemic into Australia. In what the league planned would be the first of a reduced 17-round season, the match was played without crowds in attendance due to public health prohibitions on large gatherings and with quarter lengths reduced by one fifth in order to reduce the physical load on players who would be expected to play multiple matches with short breaks in the second half of the year. Just three days later, the AFL Commission suspended the season for an indefinite period after multiple states enforced quarantine conditions on their borders that effectively ruled out the possibility of continuing the season as planned. Baker contributed 12 disposals when the season resumed in June after an 11-week hiatus, before missing round 3's match against Hawthorn to attend a funeral in his home state of Western Australia. He returned for the club's round 4 loss to St Kilda and remained in the senior side through round 6, when it was relocated to the Gold Coast in response to a virus outbreak in Melbourne. He earned a career-first Brownlow Medal vote in round 6's win over Sydney, and contributed an equal game-high six intercepts in round 8's loss to Greater Western Sydney, after which he ranked equal-second among all defenders in the league for fewest goals conceded to direct opponents so far that season (two). He contributed a best on ground performance in round 10, earning nine coaches association award votes for 580 metres gained and a then-career-high 26 disposals. Baker earned another two coaches votes for 16 disposals in round 13's Dreamtime in Darwin win over Essendon. At the end of the regular season, Baker earned selection to the 22under22 team, recognising the league's best young players. In addition, he was Richmond's nomination to the league Most Courageous player category at the AFL Players' Association awards. Baker kicked his only goal of the year in the opening match of the club's finals campaign, a qualifying final loss to the Brisbane Lions. He was among Richmond's best players in a semi-final win over St Kilda the following week, adding 19 disposals and an equal team-high six intercepts. Baker bested the latter of those stats in the preliminary final win over Port Adelaide, recording eight intercept possessions to help his side through to another Grand Final. He became a two-time premiership player the following week, playing what AFL Media described as "an excellent game" with 14 disposals and four inside-50s in a 31-point victory over Geelong. After a season in which he played 20 of a possible 21 games and won another premiership medal, Baker also placed sixth in the club's best and fairest award.

=== 2021 season ===
After an uninterrupted pre-season training period, Baker played in Richmond's one unofficial and one official pre-season match in late-February and early-March before recording 15 disposals in the club's round 1 win over Carlton. Despite recording 27 disposals and being named by AFL Media as one of his side's best player while in defence the week prior, Baker was shifted to half forward from round 6 in replacement for the injured Kane Lambert. Baker played in his 50th career match in round 8's loss to Geelong, before the next week being named as a full-time midfielder in light of injuries to Shane Edwards, Shai Bolton, Trent Cotchin and Dion Prestia. He was outstanding in the role, recording career-highs in disposals (33), inside-50s (nine) and clearances (seven) to earn eight coaches votes as second-best on ground during the comeback win over Greater Western Sydney. At the midpoint of the season, Baker was named by both AFL Media and 1116 SEN as a potential winner of the club's best and fairest award.

=== Move to West Coast ===
Following the 2024 AFL season, Baker requested a move back to his home state of Western Australia, later naming West Coast as his club of choice. Baker was traded on 15 October, joining teammate Jack Graham in moving from Richmond to West Coast.

== Player profile ==
Baker is a versatile small utility player, playing the 2021 season primarily as a half-forward, with stints at half-back and in the midfield, after winning two premierships as rebounding half-back and a small defender. He played as a small forward in his debut year and as a half forward, small forward and a wing in the first half of his second season in 2019. When playing on the defensive line in the later part of 2019 he was tasked with rebounding out of defensive 50. He has been noted for his corralling and tackle pressure while he is also acclaimed for taking clean possession of ground balls and rarely fumbling.

During the 2021 season, Baker ranked eighth on 1116 SEN's reranking of the 2017 national and rookie drafts.

== Statistics ==
Updated to the end of round 22, 2026.

Legend
G	Goals	K	Kicks	D	Disposals	T	Tackles
B	Behinds	H	Handballs	M	Marks

Season	Team	No.	Games	Totals							Averages (per game)							Votes
Season	Team	No.	Games	G	B	K	H	D	M	T	G	B	K	H	D	M	T	Votes
2018	Richmond	48	3	1	4	15	19	34	4	4	0.3	1.3	5.0	6.3	11.3	1.3	1.3	0
2019^{#}	Richmond	48	19	8	10	166	155	321	63	61	0.4	0.5	8.7	8.2	16.9	3.3	3.2	0
2020^{#}	Richmond	7	20	1	1	166	131	297	73	39	0.1	0.1	8.3	6.6	14.9	3.7	2.0	3
2021	Richmond	7	22	7	8	238	208	446	88	61	0.3	0.4	10.8	9.5	20.3	4.0	2.8	1
2022	Richmond	7	23	11	7	245	195	440	84	52	0.5	0.3	10.7	8.5	19.1	3.7	2.3	6
2023	Richmond	7	23	12	14	258	180	438	85	51	0.5	0.6	11.2	7.8	19.0	3.7	2.2	3
2024	Richmond	7	18	14	13	207	151	358	60	69	0.8	0.7	11.5	8.4	19.9	3.3	3.8	0
2025	West Coast	3	23	5	5	259	249	508	84	84	0.2	0.2	11.3	10.8	22.1	3.7	3.7	2
2026	West Coast	3	18	6	2	162	150	312	53	37	0.3	0.1	9.0	8.3	17.3	2.9	2.1	0
Career			169	65	64	1716	1438	3154	594	458	0.4	0.4	10.2	8.5	18.7	3.5	2.7	15

== Honours and achievements ==
Team

- 2× AFL premiership player (Richmond): 2019, 2020
- McClelland Trophy (Richmond): 2018

Individual

- 22under22 team: 2020
- Robert Rose Award: 2022

== Personal life ==
Outside of football Baker has worked part-time as a carpenter's apprentice and studied a carpentry course at TAFE.
