= Bailey Smith =

Australian rules footballer (born 2000)

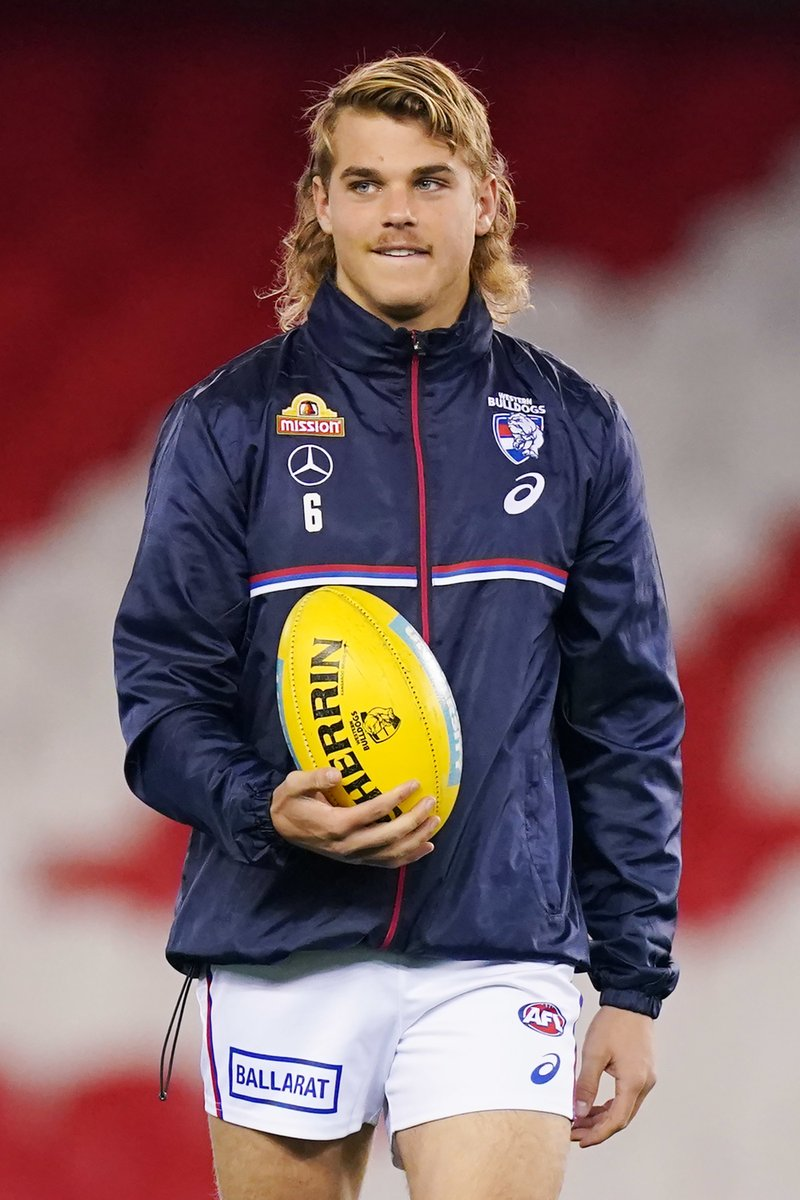
- Smith in a pregame warm up in 2020

Personal information
- Full name: Bailey Smith
- Nicknames: Bazlenka, Barry, Flecker
- Born: 7 December 2000 (age 25); Australia
- Original team: Sandringham Dragons (Vic)
- Draft: No. 7, 2018 AFL draft, Western Bulldogs
- Debut: 23 March 2019, Western Bulldogs vs. Sydney, at Marvel Stadium
- Height: 185 cm (6 ft 1 in)
- Weight: 86 kg (190 lb; 13 st 8 lb)
- Position: Midfielder

Club information
- Current club: Geelong
- Number: 3

Playing career^{1}
Years	Club	Games (Goals)
2019–2024	Western Bulldogs	103 (44)
2025–	Geelong	47 (19)
Total		150 (63)

Representative team honours^{2}
Years	Team	Games (Goals)
2026–	Victoria	1 (1)
- ^{1} Playing statistics correct to the end of 2026.^{2} Representative statistics correct as of 2026.

Career highlights
- AFLCA champion player of the year: 2025; 2x All-Australian team: 2025, 2026; Carji Greeves Medal: 2026; Bob Rose–Charlie Sutton Medal: 2021; 4x 22under22 team (2020, 2021, 2022, 2023); Chris Grant Best First Year Player: 2019; AFL Rising Star nominee: 2019

Bailey Smith (born 7 December 2000) is a professional Australian rules footballer who plays for Geelong in the Australian Football League (AFL).

Originally recruited by the Western Bulldogs with the seventh pick in the 2018 national draft, he made his debut in the 2019 season, receiving a Rising Star nomination in round 9 and finishing fourth in the final count. At the Bulldogs' he was a four-time member of the 22 Under 22 team, and a recipient of the Chris Grant Best First Year Player Award.

After five seasons and 103 games with the Bulldogs, Smith was traded to Geelong ahead of the 2025 season. In his first season with the Cats, he was named in the All-Australian team and won the AFLCA Champion Player of the Year award.

== Early life and career ==
Smith grew up in East Malvern and played his early career for the East Malvern Knights Junior Football Club in Melbourne's south-east. In 2011, he won the MSJFL under-11 west division best and fairest award. He also won a best and fairest with Xavier College while playing in the team in Year 11, and was named as a member of the AIS-AFL Academy. Smith played for the Sandringham Dragons in the NAB League for the 2017 and 2018 seasons. In his 2017 season with the Dragons, he had a very solid year as a bottom-ager, averaging 24.3 disposals and 4 tackles a game. Playing as a half-back, his breakout game with the Dragons came in the eleventh round of the season, where he collected 34 and 5 clearances to help the Dragons to a 49-point victory over the Geelong Falcons. The following week, he again led the team for disposals, collecting 32 disposals in a thrilling 1-point win over the Gippsland Power. In the fourteenth round of the season, Smith was named as the player of the round after he had the best game of his career to that point, totalling 44 disposals, 13 inside 50s and 10 clearances. At the conclusion of the season, Smith was awarded best first year player award after his promising performances.

"I haven’t seen a kid that prepares, trains and recovers as well as him before, he’s had a really strong season across TAC, Xavier & Vic Metro, but the beauty about Bails is he’s always looking for that extra edge, whether it be extra vision or focus points, which makes him really easy to coach."

— Jaskson Kornberg, Sandringham Dragons coach

Smith was named captain of Xavier College's first XVIII football team, as well as for the Sandringham Dragons, for the 2018 season. Smith was named the captain. However, he would only play two games with the team as a result of an Achilles tendon injury as well as clashing representative and school team commitments. In his first game of the season, Smith had an excellent game, collecting 37 disposals, 7 tackles and 12 clearances to be one of the best on ground. His other game came on 28 April, where he collected 28 disposals against the Western Jets. Smith was also selected to play for Vic Metro in the AFL Under 18 Championships for the 2018 season. He had his best game in the third round of the tournament, where he tallied up 20 disposals and 3 goals in what was close to a best on ground performance. He was also named in the team's best in all of the other rounds. Smith claimed Vic Metro's Most Valuable Player Award, and was named in the Under 18 All-Australian team as a midfielder. By the end of the 2018 season, Bailey Smith was touted as a top 10 pick who could be picked up by the Western Bulldogs or the Gold Coast. Smith was eventually taken at pick 7 by the Western Bulldogs in the 2018 AFL draft.

== AFL career ==
=== Western Bulldogs (2019–2024) ===
==== 2019–2020: Early career ====
When first coming to the club, it was revealed that Smith would inherit the no.6 guernsey from the outgoing Luke Dahlhaus. He missed out on a large amount of the pre-season, as a result of the Achilles tendon injury he suffered in his draft year. Despite this setback, Smith made his AFL debut in the Western Bulldogs' win over the Sydney Swans in the opening round of the 2019 AFL season. On debut, Smith collected just 8 disposals and 4 tackles. However, he would improve from there, collecting 13 disposals the next week and 22 disposals the week after that. He earned a 2019 AFL Rising Star nomination in the Bulldogs' Round 9 loss to Geelong, totalling 28 disposals, 10 contested possessions and 5 clearances. Smith had a very solid game against Brisbane Lions in round 20, collecting 27 disposals and 4 clearances. He was also named in the team's best in round 21, where he contributed 23 disposals and a goal in the team's 104-point thrashing of Essendon. At the conclusion of the season, Smith finished fourth in the 2019 NAB Rising Star award behind Sam Walsh, Connor Rozee and Sydney Stack. He was also named as the Chris Grant Best First Year Player for the Western Bulldogs. In December 2019, it was revealed that Smith would sign on with the Bulldogs until the end of 2022.

Smith had a successful 2020 season in what was to be a season majorly affected by the COVID-19 pandemic. He did not miss a single game the entire year, meaning he had played 35 consecutive games. In just his second game of the season, he had a solid game to be one of the team's best in what was a disappointing 39 point loss to St Kilda, where he collected 29 disposals, 5 tackles and 2 marks. Smith suffered a concussion early in the Bulldogs' round 5 clash against North Melbourne after being tackled by Shaun Atley, but was named fit to play the following week, continuing his run of consecutive games. Smith stood up in many disappointing losses that year, again being named as the team's best in an dismal 52-point loss to Carlton after collecting 26 disposals and a goal. His efforts in that game saw him collect 1 Brownlow Medal vote despite being on the losing side. Round 8 saw smith be named as one of the team's best while also picking up two Brownlow Medal votes, after being crucial to the Bulldogs' 5-point win over Gold Coast. Smith had his best game for the year in the Western Bulldogs' 57 point victory over Adelaide in the 12th round of the season, where he collected a career-high 37 disposals, as well as 4 marks, 3 tackles and 10 inside 50s. He followed this game up with a best on ground performance the following week which earned him 3 Brownlow Medal votes, tallying 26 disposals and a goal against Melbourne. After the finish of the season, Smith was named ruck rover of the 2020 22 Under 22 team.

==== 2021–2022: Improvement and controversies ====
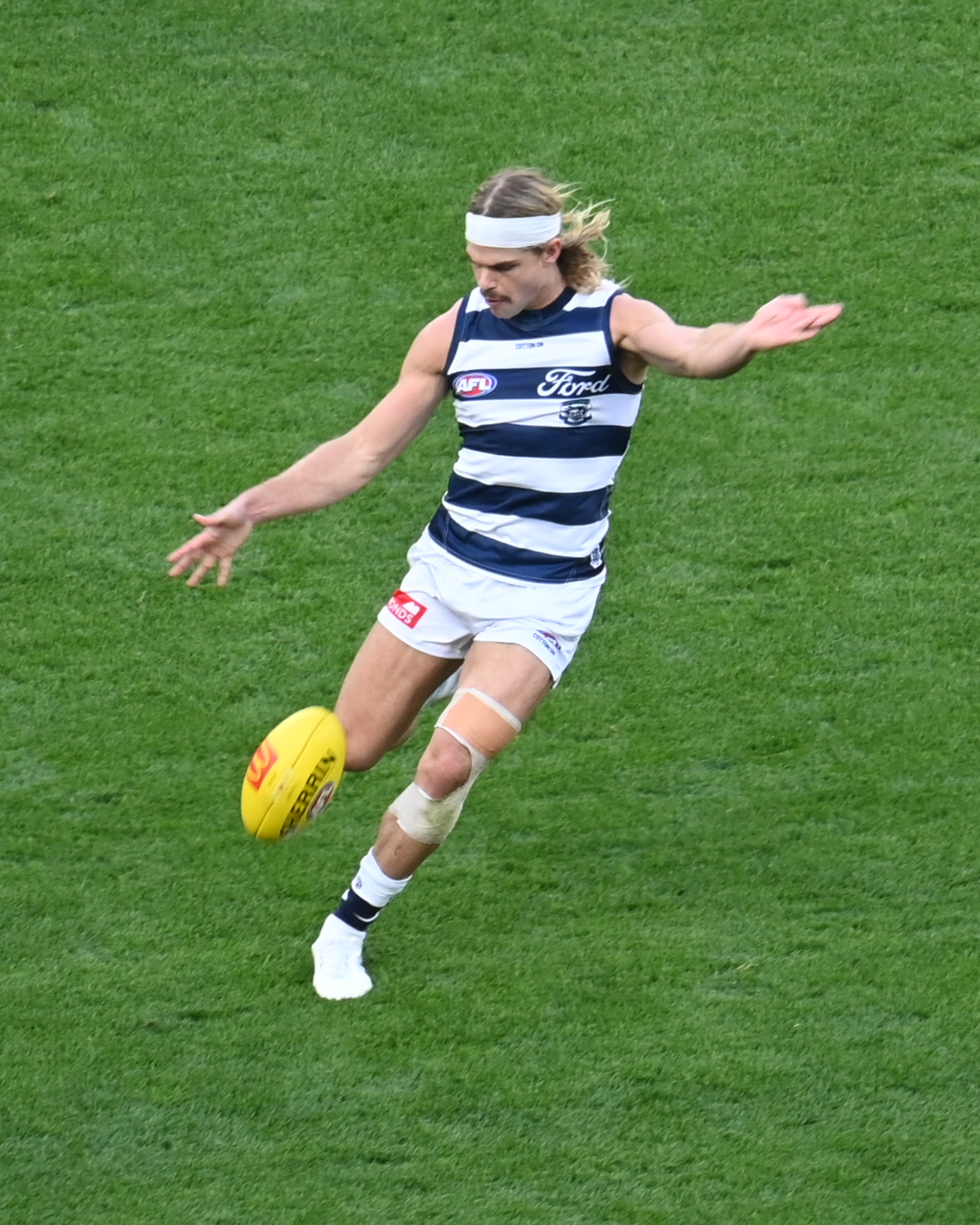
Smith playing for Geelong during the 2025 AFL season

The 2021 season was to be a season of improvement for Smith, rotating through different positions such as midfielder, wingman and forward. He had a good start to the pre-season, winning the team's running test, a display of his improved fitness. Smith was named as the Bulldogs' best on ground in their win over Collingwood in the opening round of the 2021 AFL season, winning the Bob Rose–Charlie Sutton Medal after registering 35 disposals and 2 goals. He also earned three Brownlow Medal votes as a result of his performance. He also had a solid performance in the team's 128-point demolition of North Melbourne in the Good Friday match in round 3, where he collected 26 disposals to be named one of the team's best players.

After a quiet patch of form in the mid-season, Smith began to stamp his presence on games more regularly. In round 15, he had 31 disposals and 2 goals to be best on ground behind the captain Marcus Bontempelli, which earned him two Brownlow Medal votes.

In June 2022, a video surfaced of Smith holding a bag of white powder at a party late in 2021. As a result, Smith issued a statement admitting to possessing an illicit substance. Smith subsequently received a two-match suspension.

==== 2023–2024: Injuries and Bulldogs exit ====
During the 2023/24 off season, Smith suffered an ACL injury at training causing him to be sidelined for the entire 2024 AFL season. Smith confirmed his desire to be traded at the 2024 season's end, and in October, he officially requested a trade to Geelong, and was traded on the final day of trade period.

=== Geelong (2025–present) ===
==== 2025 ====
Smith made his debut for Geelong in Round 1 of the 2025 AFL Season in the 78-point win over Fremantle, accruing 32 disposals and 1 goal, additionally earning 3 Brownlow votes for his performance. Though his first season at Geelong was primarily played out of the midfield, Smith was named on the wing in the 2025 All-Australian team. Smith came third in the 2025 Brownlow Medal, polling 29 votes for the season. Smith was apart of Geelong's losing grand final side in the 2025 AFL Grand Final.

===== Media Attention =====
Smith attracted media attention, having copped a $1,000 fine following Geelong's Round 5 victory over Adelaide after an obscene gesture (double bird) directed toward Crows fans. He also received a $1875 fine for "other misconduct" on Hawthorn's Jarman Impey, when he slammed the ball into the side of Impey's head.

In May of 2025, Bailey Smith reportedly received a "stern warning" from the AFL, following a satirical response to a comment on his Instagram post. An Instagram user commented "Nose beers after the game mate?", to which Smith replied "na bro, after the flag maybe tho". This incident was widely discussed in the media, and additionally was disparaged by the AFL itself, with AFL CEO Andrew Dillon saying "we wouldn't want to see it again". When Geelong coach, Chris Scott, was inquired about the incident, he was supportive of Smith, outlining that when online activities go over the line, "we all have conniptions". He framed the situation as a "loss of perspective", and urged members of the media to "remember he is 24."

== Public image and personal life ==
Smith has a strong presence on social media, with the most followers on Instagram out of all players in the AFL, currently having a following of over 421,000 followers. He is also recognised for his distinctive blond mullet hairstyle. Smith is a brand ambassador for the clothing chain Cotton On and drink Monster Energy. He collaborated with Cotton On on a clothing collection which was released in September 2023. He has also appeared in advertising campaigns for McDonald's, Kayo Sports, CoinSpot and Stuff That Matters. In 2023, Smith founded a company called Alter Ego Drinks and launched an alcoholic drinks line called Barry. Barry Drink currently has three flavours, and is owned by Smith with branding partners Charlie Curnow, and Josh and Nick Daicos.

Smith has been open about his mental health struggles, with his former teammate Dale Morris being a mentor to Smith, helping him to deal with his struggles. In May 2020, Smith took part in the Big Freeze challenge, where the contestants jump into icy water to help raise funds to combat motor neuron disease.

Smith has an older brother and younger sister. He is a Catholic. In 2023, Smith began studying a bachelor of business.

== Statistics ==
Updated to the end of round 22, 2026.

Legend
G	Goals	K	Kicks	D	Disposals	T	Tackles
B	Behinds	H	Handballs	M	Marks

Season	Team	No.	Games	Totals							Averages (per game)							Votes
Season	Team	No.	Games	G	B	K	H	D	M	T	G	B	K	H	D	M	T	Votes
2019	Western Bulldogs	6	23	11	10	184	222	406	58	93	0.5	0.4	8.0	9.7	17.7	2.5	4.0	0
2020 (Note: The 2020 season was played with 17 home-and-away matches per team (down from 22) and 16-minute quarters with time on (down from 20-minute quarters with time on) due to the impact of the COVID-19 pandemic.)	Western Bulldogs	6	18	6	9	190	192	382	30	44	0.3	0.5	10.6	10.7	21.2	1.7	2.4	7
2021	Western Bulldogs	6	26	17	13	354	259	613	97	87	0.7	0.5	13.6	10.0	23.6	3.7	3.3	8
2022	Western Bulldogs	6	17	6	10	285	210	495	63	65	0.4	0.6	16.8	12.4	29.1	3.7	3.8	10
2023	Western Bulldogs	6	19	4	8	230	217	447	62	66	0.2	0.4	12.1	11.4	23.5	3.3	3.5	4
2024	Western Bulldogs	6	0	—	—	—	—	—	—	—	—	—	—	—	—	—	—	0
2025	Geelong	3	23	8	7	454	266	720	111	114	0.3	0.3	19.7	11.6	31.3^{†}	4.8	5.0	29
2026	Geelong	3	24	11	6	476	298	774	96	117	0.5	0.2	19.7	12.4	32.3	4.0	4.9	36
Career			150	63	63	2173	1664	3837	517	586	0.4	0.4	14.5	11.1	25.6	3.4	3.9	94

== Honours and achievements ==
Individual

- AFLCA champion player of the year: 2025
- All-Australian team: 2025
- Carji Greeves Medal: 2026
- Chris Grant Best First Year Player: 2019
- 22 Under 22 team: 2020, 2021
- Bob Rose–Charlie Sutton Medal: 2021
