= Jordan Clark (Australian footballer) =

Australian rules footballer (born 2000)

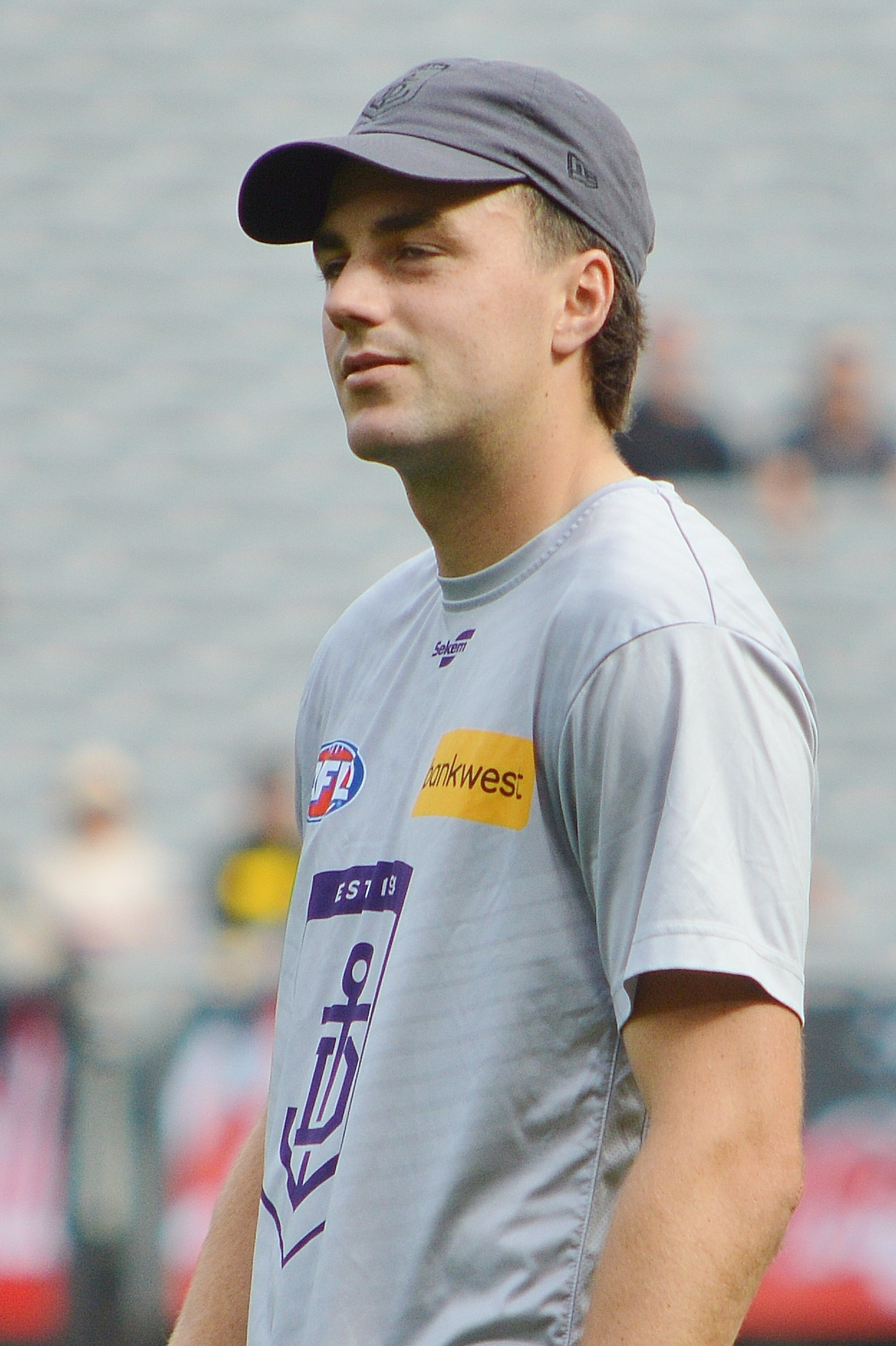
- Clark with Fremantle in April 2025

Personal information
- Full name: Jordan Charles Gordon Clark
- Born: 16 October 2000 (age 26); Mandurah, Western Australia
- Original team: Claremont (WAFL)
- Draft: No. 15, 2018 national draft
- Debut: Round 1, 2019, Geelong vs. Collingwood, at Melbourne Cricket Ground
- Height: 185 cm (6 ft 1 in)
- Weight: 83 kg (183 lb)
- Position: Defender

Club information
- Current club: Fremantle
- Number: 6

Playing career^{1}
Years	Club	Games (Goals)
2019–2021	Geelong	32 (15)
2022–	Fremantle	120 (11)
Total		152 (26)

Representative team honours
Years	Team	Games (Goals)
2026	Western Australia	1 (0)
- ^{1} Playing statistics correct to the end of the preliminary finals, 2026.

Career highlights
- 2x All-Australian team: 2025, 2026; AFL Rising Star nominee: 2019; 22under22 team: 2022; Glendinning–Allan Medal: (Rnd 6, 2026)

Jordan Charles Gordon Clark (born 16 October 2000) is a professional Australian rules footballer playing for the Fremantle Football Club in the Australian Football League (AFL), having been initially drafted to the Geelong Football Club.

== Early life ==
Clark was born in Mandurah before moving to Albany, Western Australia at age 12, where he played for the Railways Football Club. Attending Albany Senior High School, at 16 he moved to Perth to attend Guildford Grammar School on a scholarship where he would go on to play colts for the Claremont Football Club. He was selected 15th overall in the 2018 AFL draft by the Geelong Football Club.

== Cricket career ==
Clark was a talented sportsman as a junior. In January 2017, he represented the Australian under-16 national cricket team in their One Day International series against Pakistan in Dubai, taking a hat-trick in the third match.

== AFL career ==
=== Geelong (2019–2021) ===
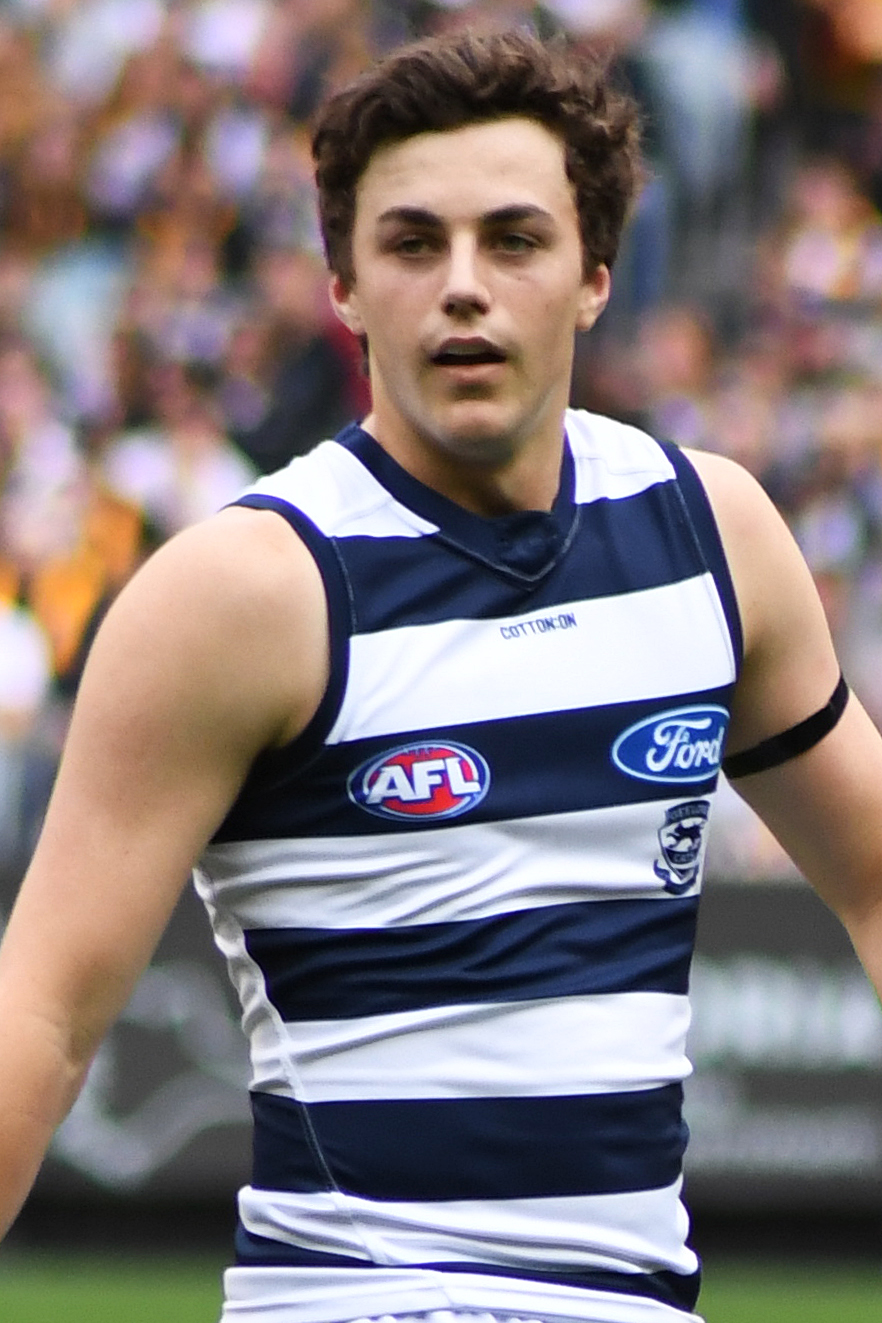
Clark playing for Geelong in 2019

Clark made his debut for Geelong in Round 1 of the 2019 AFL season against Collingwood, having 17 disposals. He received a 2019 AFL Rising Star nomination in Round 15, collecting 23 possessions and kicking a goal against Adelaide at GMHBA Stadium.

Following just 14 games played in his last two years at Geelong, Clark requested a trade to Fremantle. He was traded at the end of the 2021 AFL season. The trade saw the Dockers receive Clark and a future fourth-round selection in exchange for pick No.22 and a future third-round selection (tied to Carlton).

=== Fremantle (2022–present) ===
Clark played his first game for Fremantle in Round 1 of the 2022 AFL season in Fremantle's one-point win over Adelaide at Adelaide Oval, collecting 20 disposals and kicking a goal. He collected a career-best 29 disposals in Round 16 during Fremantle's 8-point win over Port Adelaide at Optus Stadium. Clark collected a career-best 30 disposals the next week, beating his record of 29 set the week prior during Fremantle's 41-point win over St Kilda at Marvel Stadium. Two weeks later, he played his 50th game against Richmond. Clark finished his first season at Fremantle having played every game and averaging a career-high 21.3 disposals.

Clark had a strong start to his third season at Fremantle, averaging elite numbers in disposals, kicks and marks. He collected 28 disposals in round two of the 2024 AFL season against North Melbourne at Marvel Stadium, and 30 disposals two weeks later against Carlton at Adelaide Oval, which was played in Adelaide due to the AFL's annual Gather Round. Clark was one of Fremantle's better players in their Round 11 draw with Collingwood, collecting a career-best 35 disposals. He would beat this record by one disposal the next week, during the Dockers 92-point win over the Demons at Traeger Park in Alice Springs. Clark finished the season having played every game for the third year in a row, and was one of five Fremantle players named in the initial 44-man 2024 All-Australian squad.

Following a career-best season in 2025, Clark received his first All-Australian selection, named in the back pocket of the 2025 All-Australian team. In January 2026, he was voted into Fremantle's leadership group. In February, Clark was picked to play for Western Australia in the revised State of Origin match against Victoria. In Round 6 of the 2026 AFL season, he was awarded the Glendinning-Allan Medal for a best-on-ground performance in Western Derby 62, recording 27 disposals, 11 score involvements and kicking a goal. At the end of the season, Clark was once again named in the All-Australian team at half-back. He also played every game for the fifth consecutive year, having yet to miss a match since joining the Dockers. Following the home-and-away season, Clark played his 150th game in a home qualifying final against Hawthorn, being named as Fremantle's best player after the match.

== Statistics ==
Updated to the end of round 22, 2026.

Legend
G	Goals	K	Kicks	D	Disposals	T	Tackles
B	Behinds	H	Handballs	M	Marks

Season	Team	No.	Games	Totals							Averages (per game)							Votes
Season	Team	No.	Games	G	B	K	H	D	M	T	G	B	K	H	D	M	T	Votes
2019	Geelong	6	18	11	8	171	78	249	76	48	0.6	0.4	9.5	4.3	13.8	4.2	2.7	0
2020 (Note: The 2020 season was played with 17 home-and-away matches per team (down from 22) and 16-minute quarters with time on (down from 20-minute quarters with time on) due to the impact of the COVID-19 pandemic.)	Geelong	6	3	1	1	24	14	38	12	10	0.3	0.3	8.0	4.7	12.7	4.0	3.3	0
2021	Geelong	6	11	3	2	61	52	113	26	22	0.3	0.2	5.5	4.7	10.3	2.4	2.0	0
2022	Fremantle	6	24	3	4	292	215	507	120	66	0.1	0.2	12.2	9.0	21.1	5.0	2.8	1
2023	Fremantle	6	23	1	1	266	175	441	131	63	0.0	0.0	11.6	7.6	19.2	5.7	2.7	0
2024	Fremantle	6	23	3	2	382	186	568	156	62	0.1	0.1	16.6	8.1	24.7	6.8	2.7	4
2025	Fremantle	6	24	2	3	381	198	579	114	72	0.1	0.1	15.9	8.3	24.1	4.8	3.0	4
2026	Fremantle	6	21	2	0	300	163	463	101	44	0.1	0.0	14.3	7.8	22.0	4.8	2.1	0
Career			147	26	21	1877	1081	2958	736	387	0.2	0.1	12.8	7.4	20.1	5.0	2.6	9
