= 2019 AFL Rising Star =

2019 NAB AFL Rising Star
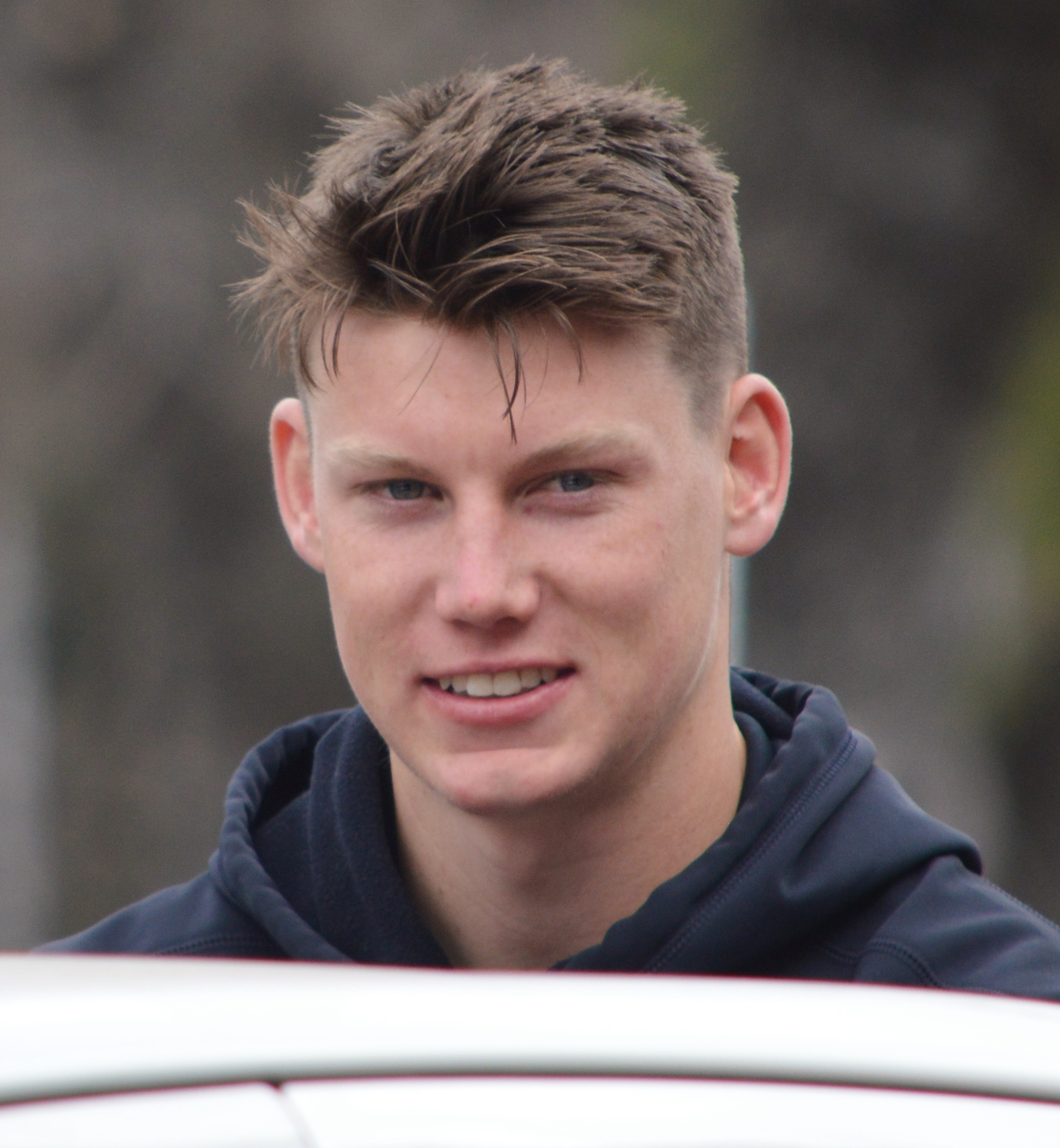
- Sam Walsh, winner
- Sponsored by: National Australia Bank
- Country: Australia
- Ron Evans medallist: Sam Walsh (Carlton)

The NAB AFL Rising Star award is given annually to a standout young player in the Australian Football League (AFL). The award was won by Carlton's Sam Walsh, marking the fourth time that a player taken first in the draft had won the award.

== Eligibility ==
Every round, a nomination is given to a standout young player who performed well during that particular round. To be eligible for nomination, a player must be under 21 on 1 January of that year and have played ten or fewer senior games before the start of the season; a player who is suspended may be nominated, but is not eligible to win the award.

== Nominations ==
2019 AFL Rising Star nominees
Round	Player	Club	Ref.
1	Bailey Scott	North Melbourne	
2	Charlie Constable	Geelong	
3	Connor Rozee	Port Adelaide	
4	Sam Walsh	Carlton	
5	Jack Petruccelle	West Coast	
6	Xavier Duursma	Port Adelaide	
7	Cameron Zurhaar	North Melbourne	
8	Gryan Miers	Geelong	
9	Bailey Smith	Western Bulldogs	
10	Liam Baker	Richmond	
11	Sydney Stack	Richmond	
12	Tarryn Thomas	North Melbourne	
13	Dylan Clarke	Essendon	
14	Nick Blakey	Sydney	
15	Jordan Clark	Geelong	
16	Nick Larkey	North Melbourne	
17	Shai Bolton	Richmond	
18	Mitchell Lewis	Hawthorn	
19	Ben King	Gold Coast	
20	Noah Answerth	Brisbane Lions	
21	Oscar Allen	West Coast	
22	Josh Battle	St Kilda	
23	Brent Daniels	Greater Western Sydney	

== Final voting ==
	Player	Club	Votes
1	Sam Walsh	Carlton	54
2	Connor Rozee	Port Adelaide	42
3	Sydney Stack	Richmond	28
4	Bailey Smith	Western Bulldogs	20
5	Jordan Clark	Geelong	5
5	Gryan Miers	Geelong	5
7	Cameron Zurhaar	North Melbourne	4
8	Nick Blakey	Sydney	3
9	Liam Baker	Richmond	3
10	Oscar Allen	West Coast	1
10	Xavier Duursma	Port Adelaide	1
