= Sydney Stack =

Australian rules footballer (born 2000)

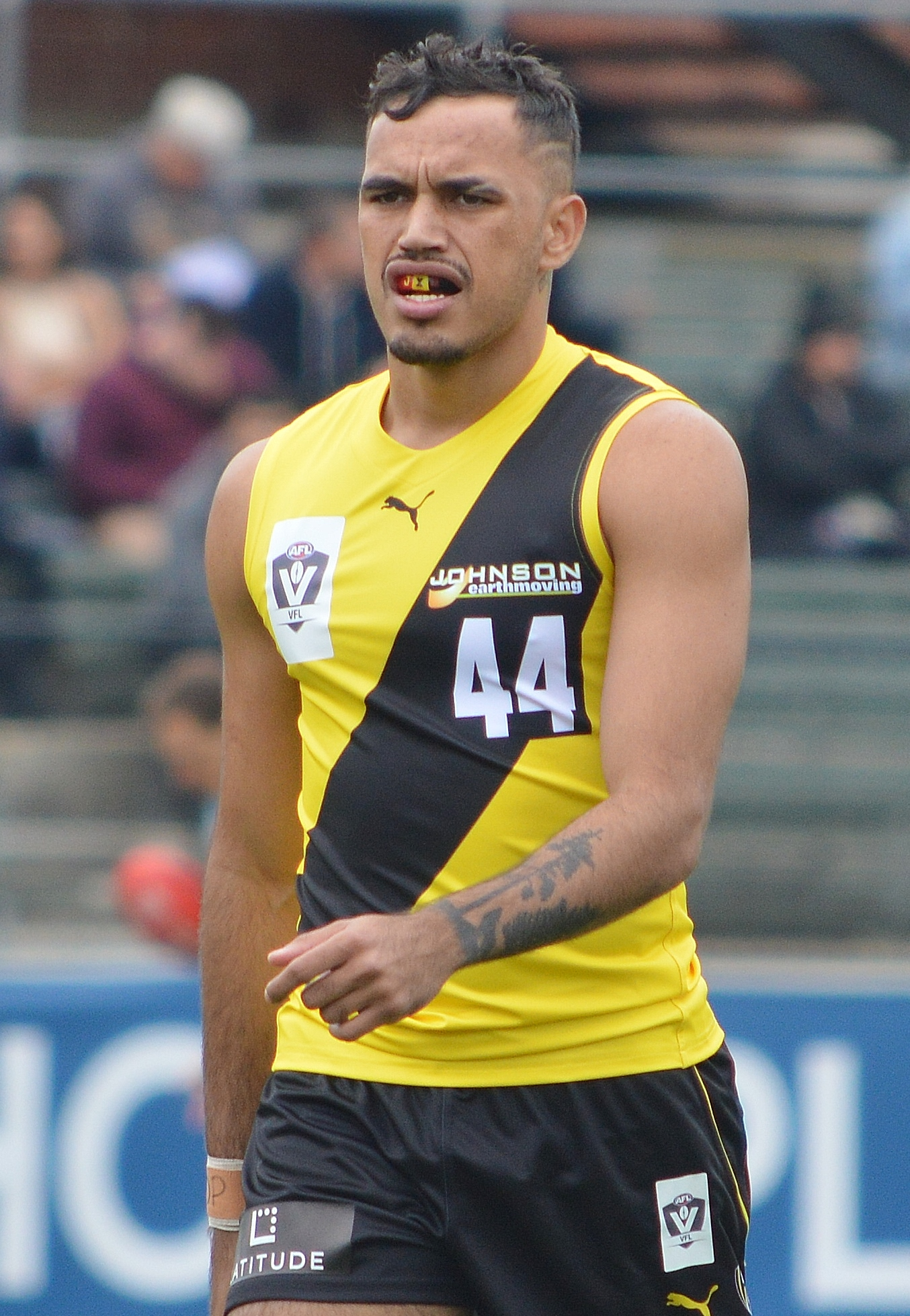
- Stack with Richmond's VFL team in April 2021

Personal information
- Born: 28 April 2000 (age 26); Northam, Western Australia
- Original team: Perth (WAFL)
- Draft: Pre-season supplemental signing, 2019
- Debut: Round 3, 2019, Richmond vs. Greater Western Sydney, at Giants Stadium
- Height: 179 cm (5 ft 10 in)
- Weight: 72 kg (159 lb)
- Position: Forward / Defender

Playing career^{1}
Years	Club	Games (Goals)
2019–2022	Richmond	35 (14)
- ^{1} Playing statistics correct to the end of 2022 season.

Career highlights
- AFL: AFL Rising Star nominee: 2019; Cosgrove–Jenkins Award (RFC Best First-Year Player): 2019; VFL: VFL premiership player: 2019; Junior: Under 18 All-Australian: 2018; WAFL Colts team of the year: 2018; Perth Colts best & fairest: 2018

Sydney Stack (born 28 April 2000) is a professional Australian rules footballer who played for the Richmond Football Club in the Australian Football League (AFL). He played junior representative football with Perth in the WAFL and represented Western Australia at national championships at under 18 level where he was named All-Australian in 2018. After being undrafted in 2018, Stack was signed by Richmond as a supplemental selection in 2019 and made his AFL debut in round 3, 2019.

== Early life and junior football ==
Stack was born in Northam, Western Australia, a country town 97 kilometres east-northeast of Perth. One of seven children, Stack endured a difficult childhood including living under the care of many different relatives as a result of substance abuse, mental illness and criminal convictions in his direct family. His father was jailed for criminal offences in 2004 and after moving with his mother between homes in Northam, Perth, Bunbury and Koongamia, he returned to Northam at age six where he was raised under the care of his aunt. There he played junior football at the local Barons and Federals Football Clubs in Northam. He relocated to Koongamia to live under the care of his brother at age 11, before shifting again to live with his sister at age 12 and then return to Northam under his Aunt's care at age 13. He remained there for three years, returning to local football before moving yet again at age 16 into the care of other relatives while sporadically attending high school at Northam Senior High School through the end of year 11 classes. He continued to experience housing uncertainty during his late teenage years, including living with extended family members, with his sister in Bunbury, with friends in Darwin and in a home for country footballers in Perth. At that time, Stack played Colts football for Perth in the junior ranks of the WAFL including in 2017 where he held averages of 18 disposals per game. Later that year he represented Western Australia at the 2017 2017 AFL Under 18 Championships. Despite being younger than most of those selected, Stack earned a spot in each of the side's four matches at the tournament, kicking two goals. He also travelled to New Zealand as part of a junior Australian team that played the New Zealand national senior team in an exhibition match in April 2017. At the end of the 2017 season Stack played in an under 17s exhibition match at Simonds Stadium in Geelong.

After earning selection to the Western Australian squad competing at the 2018 AFL Under 18 Championships, Stack was left out of the state's round 1 side for missing a compulsory training session the day after getting into a physical altercation over family disputes at a birthday celebration. He spent just one match on the sidelines however, earning a place in the tournaments second round where he was one of the state's best players with 23 disposals and four clearances. In a later match against Vic Country, Stack recorded 22 disposals, thanks largely to a prolific second half performance. At the end of the tournament Stack was named All-Australian after he held an average of 21.3 disposals per match playing as a midfielder.

In 2018 he also played three senior-level WAFL matches for Perth, and while playing at Colts level he received the club best and fairest award and was named in the WAFL Colts Team of the Year.

Despite strong on-field performances that year, Stack had recurring off-field issues that saw him forced out of the AFL Academy and Western Australian state academy for disciplinary reasons.

=== AFL recruitment ===
Prior to the 2018 AFL draft Stack was lauded for his ability to apply on-ball pressure, for his composure in traffic and his clean ball use and well as his physical traits of speed and acceleration.

In a late-October mock draft, ESPN predicted Stack to be taken with the 28th pick in the upcoming AFL draft, while in their draft-week predictions, Draft Central and Fox Footy forecast Stack to be selected with the 36th and 53rd overall picks respectively.

Despite those predictions, Stack was ultimately passed on by all 18 AFL clubs at the national and rookie drafts in 2018 due to concerns over his fitness and dedication to training standards.

=== Junior statistics ===
Legend
G	Goals	K	Kicks	D	Disposals	T	Tackles
B	Behinds	H	Handballs	M	Marks

Under 18 National Championships

Season	Team	No.	Games	Totals							Averages (per game)						
Season	Team	No.	Games	G	B	K	H	D	M	T	G	B	K	H	D	M	T
2017	Western Australia	8	4	2	—	17	24	41	12	11	0.5	—	4.3	6.0	10.3	3.0	2.8
2018	Western Australia	14	3	1	—	24	41	65	5	8	0.3	—	8.0	13.7	21.7	1.7	2.7
Career			7	3	—	41	65	106	17	19	0.4	—	5.9	9.3	15.1	2.4	2.7

== AFL career ==
=== 2019 season ===
In the days following the 2018 draft, Stack was offered a chance to train with Richmond under a trial period basis. He moved to Melbourne in December 2018 and temporarily moved in with the family of coach Damien Hardwick. Stack impressed during his trial and in February 2019, was signed by the club under the AFL's newly introduced pre-season supplemental selection rules.

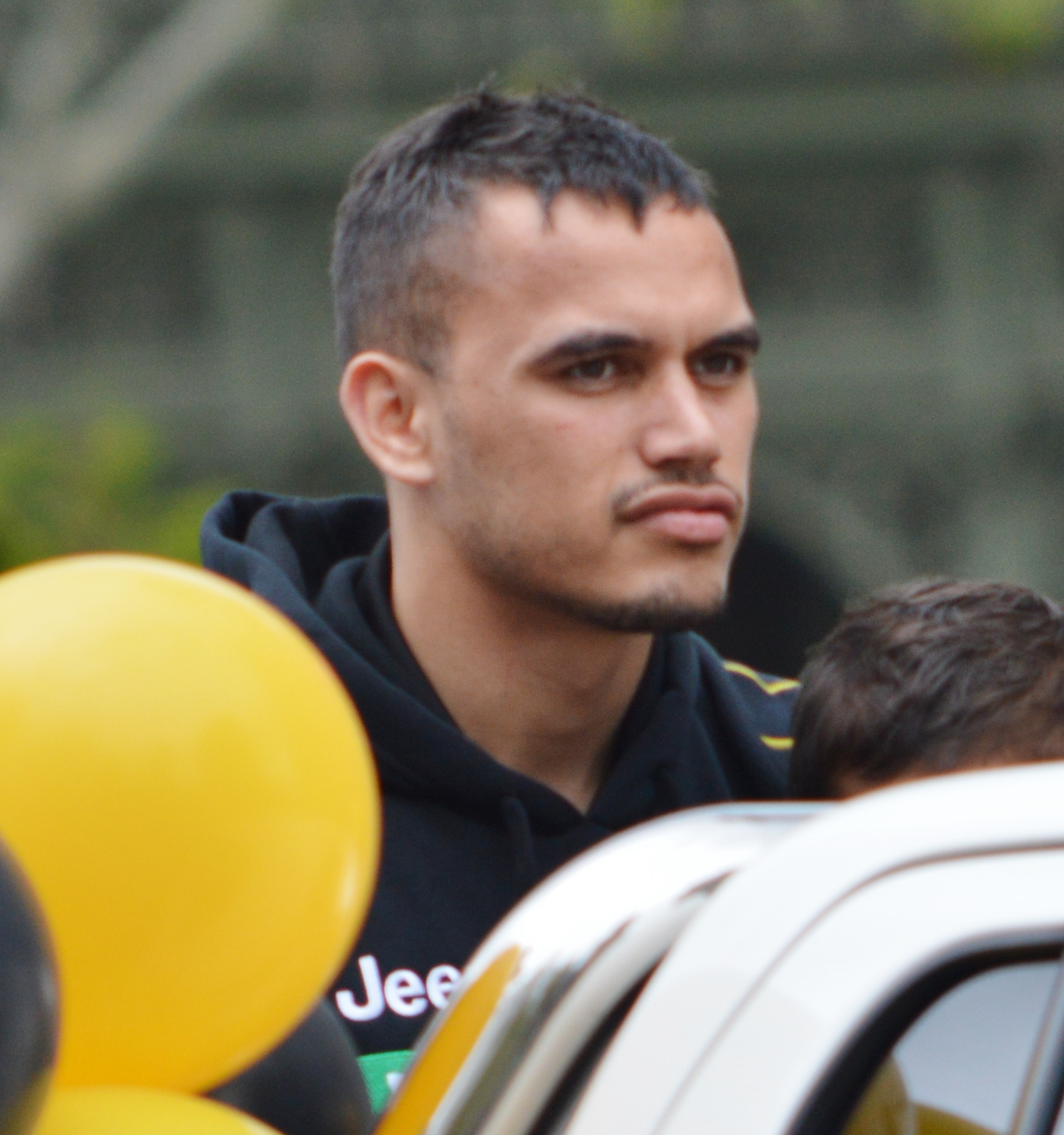
Stack travelling as an emergency in the 2019 AFL grand final parade

During his first AFL pre-season, Stack trained mostly with Richmond's backline unit after coaches recognised his poor aerobic fitness base that caused him to regularly vomit during running sessions would mean he could not play his natural position as an inside midfielder at AFL level. Over the pre-season he found a focus in improving his aerobic fitness, which club officials highlighted as a key deficiency. He played his first football for the club as a half-back in VFL practice matches in March before being named for a round 3 AFL debut against Greater Western Sydney at Giants Stadium in Sydney. Stack was among Richmond's best players in his debut match, kicking a goal, recording 17 disposals and taking eight marks. He held his spot at AFL level the following week before recording 22 disposals against Sydney in round 5 where he was named among Richmond's best players by The Age. Stack gained significant fan and media attention in round 6's ANZAC Day eve win over Melbourne where he took a spectacular mark that was nominated for the AFL's Mark of the Week and laid a brutal-but-legal bump on Melbourne captain Jack Viney that resulted in a two-week shoulder injury to the receiving Viney. After nine rounds of the season and seven matches AFL matches, Stack ranked fourth in total marks and total intercepts, fifth in effective disposals per game and eight in total rebound 50s among Rising Star eligible players. In round 10's Dreamtime at the 'G Indigenous culture celebration match, Stack participated in the club's pre-game war cry usually performed by non-playing club representatives. The following week he posted a then career-best 24 disposals, five marks and four tackles in a loss to North Melbourne, earning a nomination for the league's Rising Star award. To that point, he ranked number one among Rising Star eligible players for total intercepts, second in total marks and seventh in both total disposals and tackles that season. Stack was named in the AFL Media Team of the Week for round 13 following as loss to Adelaide in which he recorded 22 disposals. 1116 SEN commentator Kane Cornes labelled Stack one of the biggest 'steals' in draft history following that match and ranked him as the second most promising player from his draft class. At the same time, Stack was ranked number one that season among Rising Star eligible players under Champion Data's AFL player ratings system. Following the club's mid-season bye and after the injury return of many of Richmond's senior leaders, Stack was shifted from the backline into a forward role for the club's round 15 match up against St Kilda. He was exceptional in his first time playing that role, kicking four goals in a performance that saw him named among Richmond's best players by the Herald Sun, The Age and AFL Media. In addition, he was named best on ground by the coaches with nine votes in the AFLCA player of the year award and was also named to AFL Media's team of the week. Stack remained as a forward through the month of July, kicking three goals over his next four matches but suffering calf soreness in the lead-up to round 20's match against Melbourne that forced him to sit out that win. He returned for one match at AFL level but was omitted from the senior side in round 22 following a 12 disposal performance. Stack excelled with 15 disposals in the first half of his first match at VFL level since March, before suffering a serious ankle injury just before half time. He underwent surgery to repair what was revealed to be a syndesmosis injury and with a recovery time frame of four weeks, was at risk of missing the entirety of the club's AFL and VFL finals series. Stack resumed weight-assisted running one week after his surgery and was running unassisted and taking part in light drills by the middle of September. He returned to football in the club's VFL grand final, five weeks after his initial injury. Stack played on reduced minutes and suffered a fresh minor rolled ankle in the match, notching a total of six disposals as his side won the club's first reserves premiership since 1997. He was considered sufficiently fit to be named an emergency for the following week's AFL grand final, though he would go unselected in the final premiership-winning side. At season's end, Stack placed third in the league's Rising Star award and was named in the AFL players' association's 22under22 team, which recognises the best young players in the league. He also placed equal 13th in the club's best and fairest count and won the Cosgrove–Jenkins Award as Richmond's best first year player.

=== 2020 season ===
Prior to the start of the 2020 season, AFL statistics partner Champion Data rated Stack in the top tier "elite" category among general defenders in the league. He began pre-season training in November 2019 and spent the summer training as a half-back and a small forward. He returned to the club's AFL lineup with appearances in each of the club's two pre-season matches, including a 20-disposal, eight-tackle outing in the final match of the series which also featured a spectacular mark over Greater Western Sydney forward Toby Greene. Stack's performances earned him selection for the season-opening win over Carlton a fortnight later, played under extraordinary conditions imposed on the league as a result of the rapid progression of the coronavirus pandemic into Australia. In what the league planned would be the first of a reduced 17-round season, the match was played without crowds in attendance due to public health prohibitions on large gatherings and with quarter lengths reduced by one fifth in order to reduce the physical load on players who would be expected to play multiple matches with short breaks in the second half of the year. Just three days later, the AFL Commission suspended the season for an indefinite period after multiple states enforced quarantine conditions on their borders that effectively ruled out the possibility of continuing the season as planned. After an 11-week hiatus, Stack contributed a career-low four disposals from half-back in a round 2 draw with Collingwood in early-June. He continued as a half-back for a further two matches, but was dropped from the club's round 5 side following multiple goal-costing errors among outputs that included six and four clangers in rounds 3 and 4, respectively. Stack played midfield minutes in two unofficial scratch matches held in place of the cancelled VFL season over the coming month, including one played alongside players from Melbourne and Geelong due to the limited availability of players after a virus outbreak in Melbourne saw all Victorian-based clubs relocated to the Gold Coast with partial playing groups. He was eventually recalled to AFL level in round 9, splitting time between the forward line and midfield for the first time in his career, while laying a then career-best seven tackles. Stack continued to play midfield and forward minutes in AFL matches through the club's round 13 Dreamtime in Darwin Indigenous celebration game, before a minor hip injury saw him miss the club's round 14 match against West Coast. He returned to reserves level for one week, before committing a breach of the league's COVID-19 safety protocols in early September that saw Stack handed a league-imposed 10-match suspension. With Stack ineligible to compete in the remaining two regular season games or the finals series, he left the club's Gold Coast accommodation the following day, ending his season after nine matches at AFL level in 2020.

=== 2021 season ===
After briefly returning to pre-season training in December 2020, Stack was remanded in custody in his home state of Western Australia later that month, after returning for a family matter and subsequently breaching the state's strict COVID-19 quarantine requirements.

Stack was ineligible to play until round 5, given the remaining four matches on his 2020 suspension.

=== 2022 season ===
Stack was delisted at the end of the 2022 season, having only played 9 games over the past two seasons.

== Player profile ==
Stack is capable of playing many positions, including as a half-back or small forward, where he split his time in his first AFL and VFL seasons. Richmond's coaching staff said in 2019 that with improved fitness, Stack would be expected to move into a midfield role later in his AFL career.

== AFL statistics ==
Updated to the end of round 23, 2022.

Legend
G	Goals	K	Kicks	D	Disposals	T	Tackles
B	Behinds	H	Handballs	M	Marks

Season	Team	No.	Games	Totals							Averages (per game)						
Season	Team	No.	Games	G	B	K	H	D	M	T	G	B	K	H	D	M	T
2019	Richmond	44	17	10	9	132	160	292	83	51	0.6	0.5	7.8	9.4	17.2	4.9	3.0
2020 (Note: The 2020 season was played with 17 home-and-away matches per team (down from 22) and 16-minute quarters with time on (down from 20-minute quarters with time on) due to the impact of the COVID-19 pandemic.)	Richmond	44	9	2	2	30	62	92	15	26	0.2	0.2	3.3	6.9	10.2	1.7	2.9
2021	Richmond	44	7	2	1	60	57	117	36	17	0.3	0.1	8.6	8.1	16.1	5.1	2.4
2022	Richmond	44	2	0	1	3	2	5	3	2	0.0	0.5	1.5	1.0	2.5	1.5	1.0
Career			35	14	13	225	281	506	137	96	0.4	0.4	6.4	8.0	14.5	3.9	2.7

== Honours and achievements ==
AFL

- AFL Rising Star nominee: 2019
- Cosgrove–Jenkins Award (RFC Best First-Year Player): 2019

VFL

- VFL premiership player: 2019

Junior

- Under 18 All-Australian: 2018
- WAFL Colts team of the year: 2018
- Perth Colts best & fairest: 2018

== Personal life ==
Stack is cousin to Collingwood forward Bobby Hill and shares a relation to former Western Bulldogs player Brennan Stack.

In November 2019, Stack began a relationship with Richmond AFL Women's midfielder Monique Conti. The pair split in July 2020.

Stack began dating Fremantle AFLW draftee Mikayla Morrison in December 2020.

He is an Aboriginal Australian man of the Noongar people.

== Controversies ==
=== COVID-19 restrictions breach ===
In the early hours of the morning of 4 September 2020, Stack, alongside teammate Callum Coleman-Jones, was fined for Public Nuisance by Queensland Police following an altercation with a member of the public outside a Gold Coast kebab shop. An AFL investigation was launched later that day to establish any breaches of the league's COVID-19 safety protocol that was designed to reduce the risk of COVID-19 transmission to players by severely limiting interactions between players and the general public. The investigation ultimately found Stack and Coleman-Jones had committed three breaches, including engaging in the altercation, travelling in an Uber and visiting a "non-approved venue", which was named in media reports as a Gold Coast strip club. Each player was issued with a season-ending ten-match suspension for their infractions, and both left the Richmond's Gold Coast accommodation the following day. As a second breach that season, Richmond was also fined $75,000 and ordered to pay a previously suspended $25,000 charge from the earlier breach.

=== Western Australia COVID-19 breach and remand ===
On 10 December 2020, Stack travelled to his home state of West Australia to attend a family funeral. After transiting through Adelaide airport, which was then a COVID-19 hotspot, Stack was subject a 14-day home isolation requirement per Western Australian public health laws, which he nominated to complete at a family home in Northam.

In the early hours of the morning of Saturday 19 December, Stack was stopped by police following alleged participation in a fight outside a nightclub in the Perth suburb of Northbridge. He was arrested by police at the scene for allegedly breaching his isolation requirements, both by being out in public and by relocating to a Belmont residence in the days prior. He was charged with failing to comply with a direction and was refused bail at a preliminary hearing the following day.

Stack was held on remand in Perth's Hakea Prison, where he completed a fresh 14-day health isolation period. He was granted bail after a bail application hearing on 8 January 2021 and following a total of 19 days in the prison. Stack eventually pleaded guilty on one count of failing to comply with a direction at a Magistrates Court hearing on 20 January, and remained on bail until a sentencing hearing on 25 March.
