= Gryan Miers =

Australian rules football player

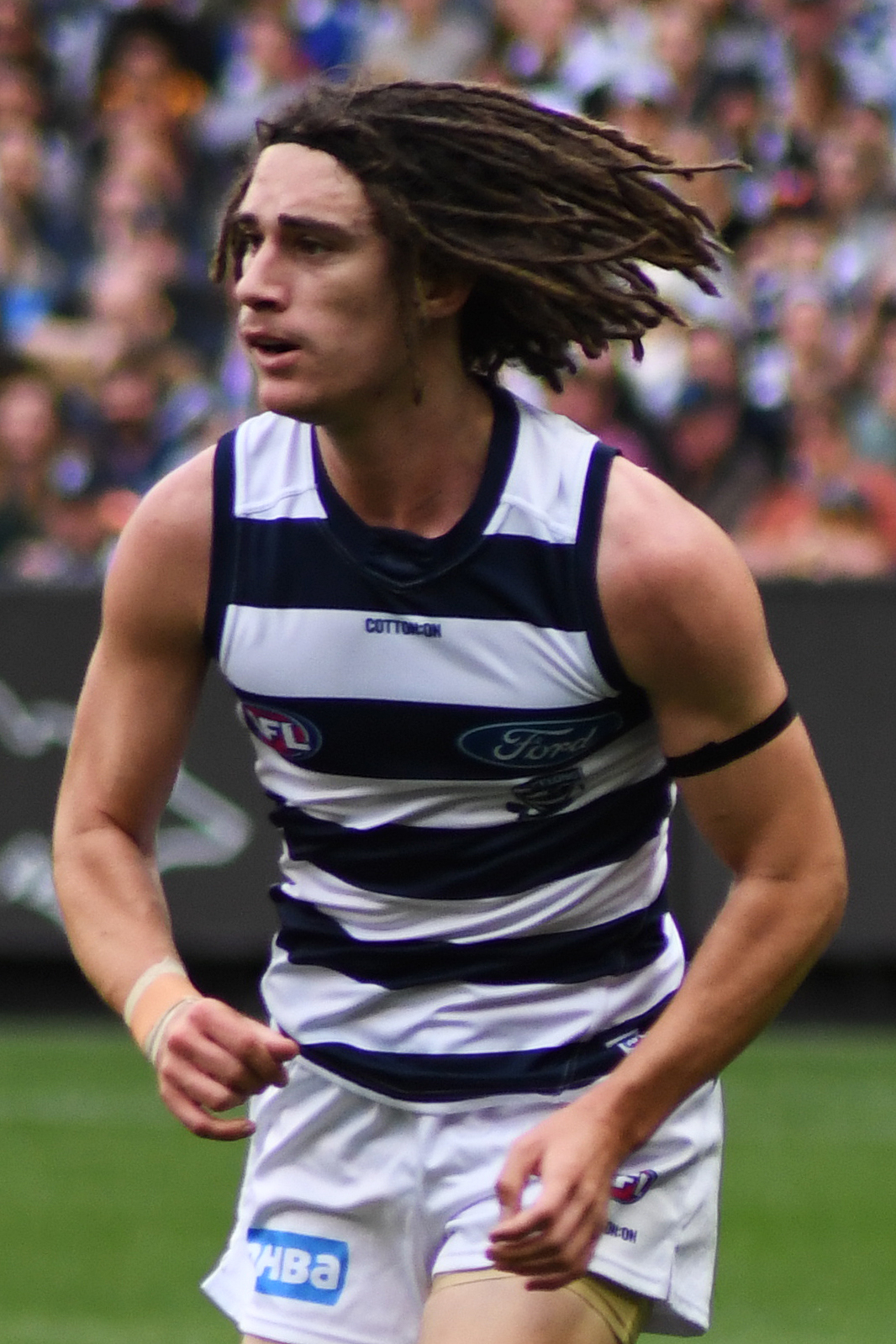
- Miers playing for Geelong in April 2019

Personal information
- Full name: Gryan Revyl Miers
- Born: 30 March 1999 (age 27)
- Original teams: Geelong Falcons (TAC Cup); Grovedale (GFL)
- Draft: No. 57, 2017 national draft
- Debut: Round 1, 2019, Geelong vs. Collingwood, at the MCG
- Height: 178 cm (5 ft 10 in)
- Weight: 78 kg (172 lb)
- Position: Forward / midfielder

Club information
- Current club: Geelong
- Number: 32

Playing career^{1}
Years	Club	Games (Goals)
2019–	Geelong	172 (120)
- ^{1} Playing statistics correct to the end of 2026.

Career highlights
- AFL Premiership Player: 2022; AFL Rising Star nominee: 2019; 22 Under 22 team 2020; Geelong best young player: 2019

Gryan Revyl Miers (born 30 March 1999) is an Australian rules footballer playing for Geelong in the Australian Football League (AFL). A small forward, he played in the TAC Cup before he was recruited by Geelong with pick 57 in the 2017 national draft. Miers debuted in the opening round of the 2019 season and was nominated for the AFL Rising Star award in round 8.

== Junior career ==
Miers played junior football for St Mary's and Grovedale before representing the Geelong Falcons in the TAC Cup. In their victorious 2017 season, he kicked a league-high 50 goals, including a haul of seven in the grand final against the Sandringham Dragons, when he was named best on ground. Miers was also named in the competition's team of the year, averaging 17 disposals and four tackles from his 17 matches. He represented Vic Country in four matches at the 2017 AFL Under 18 Championships as a midfielder, averaging 18 disposals and five marks.

Miers' agility, pressure and crumbing ability were strengths in his junior career, but his kicking was identified as a deficiency. He was named as "one of AFL's next big cult heroes" by Fox Sports for his dreadlocks, unusual name, football ability and confidence in important matches. Miers was predicted to be drafted in the second or third rounds of the 2017 AFL national draft by ESPN, and in "second-round — possible first-round — calculations" by Fox Sports.

== AFL career ==
Miers was selected by Geelong with pick 57 in the 2017 national draft. He spent his first season in the Victorian Football League (VFL), playing all 20 matches and averaging one goal per game. In 2019, Miers debuted in the opening round of the season against Collingwood. He was nominated for the AFL Rising Star award in round 8, after amassing 22 possessions and kicking one goal against North Melbourne; up to that point he had played every match. An analysis by AFL.com.au reporter Callum Twomey identified him as a "key factor in the Cats' place atop the ladder", along with fellow recruit Luke Dahlhaus. In June, Miers signed a contract extension with Geelong to the end of 2021.

== Statistics ==
Updated to the end of round 22, 2026.

Legend
G	Goals	K	Kicks	D	Disposals	T	Tackles
B	Behinds	H	Handballs	M	Marks
#	Played in that season's premiership team

Season	Team	No.	Games	Totals							Averages (per game)							Votes
Season	Team	No.	Games	G	B	K	H	D	M	T	G	B	K	H	D	M	T	Votes
2019	Geelong	32	25	28	19	229	156	385	98	48	1.1	0.8	9.2	6.2	15.4	3.9	1.9	0
2020 (Note: The 2020 season was played with 17 home-and-away matches per team (down from 22) and 16-minute quarters with time on (down from 20-minute quarters with time on) due to the impact of the COVID-19 pandemic.)	Geelong	32	21	19	6	188	97	285	93	33	0.9	0.3	9.0	4.6	13.6	4.4	1.6	3
2021	Geelong	32	15	12	7	130	102	232	58	23	0.8	0.5	8.7	6.8	15.5	3.9	1.5	0
2022^{#}	Geelong	32	22	13	13	174	153	327	80	47	0.6	0.6	7.9	7.0	14.9	3.6	2.1	0
2023	Geelong	32	23	7	13	259	179	438	108	67	0.3	0.6	11.3	7.8	19.0	4.7	2.9	2
2024	Geelong	32	25	21	12	315	190	505	101	106	0.8	0.5	12.6	7.6	20.2	4.0	4.2	2
2025	Geelong	32	24	14	13	353	181	534	136	76	0.6	0.5	14.7	7.5	22.3	5.7	3.2	8
2026	Geelong	32	13	4	5	153	113	266	67	28	0.3	0.4	11.8	8.7	20.5	5.2	2.2	2
Career			168	118	88	1801	1171	2972	741	428	0.7	0.5	10.7	7.0	17.7	4.4	2.5	17

== Honours and achievements ==
Team

- AFL premiership player (Geelong): 2022
- 2× McClelland Trophy (Geelong): 2019, 2022

Individual

- 22under22 team: 2020
- Geelong F.C. Best Young Player Award: 2019
- AFL Rising Star nominee: 2019 (round 8)

== Personal life ==
During his childhood, Miers supported the Brisbane Lions. His father, David Miers, is a biomechanist who was listed with Collingwood in the 1980s and founded XBlades, a footwear company.

In 2026, Miers completed a Bachelor of Business (Sports Management) at Deakin University.
