= Shai Bolton =

Australian rules footballer (born 1998)

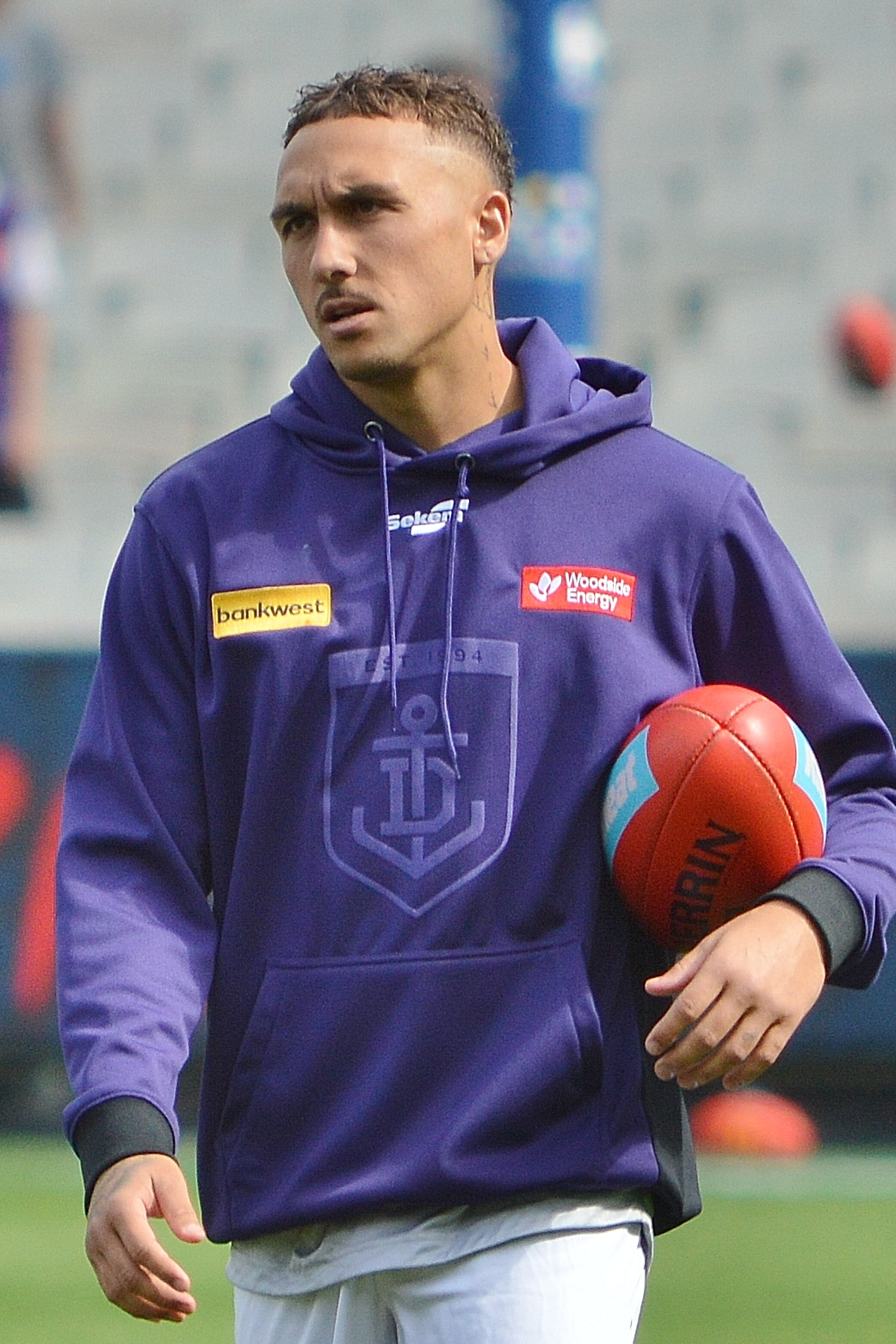
- Bolton in April 2025

Personal information
- Born: 8 December 1998 (age 27); Katanning, Western Australia, Australia
- Original team: South Fremantle (WAFL)
- Draft: No. 29, 2016 national draft
- Debut: Round 9, 2017, Richmond vs. Greater Western Sydney, at Spotless Stadium
- Height: 176 cm (5 ft 9 in)
- Weight: 77 kg (170 lb)
- Position: Midfielder / forward

Club information
- Current club: Fremantle
- Number: 10

Playing career^{1}
Years	Club	Games (Goals)
2017–2024	Richmond	135 (165)
2025–	Fremantle	48 (53)
Total		183 (218)

Representative team honours
Years	Team	Games (Goals)
2025	Indigenous All-Stars	1 (0)
2026	Western Australia	1 (1)
- ^{1} Playing statistics correct to the end of the preliminary finals, 2026.

Career highlights
- 2× AFL premiership player: 2019, 2020; Norm Smith Medal: 2026; 2× All-Australian: 2022, 2026; AFL Mark of the Year: 2021; Yiooken Award: 2020; AFL Rising Star nominee: 2019; Richmond leading goalkicker: 2024; Richmond Life Member: 2019; Arthur Leggett Medal: 2026

Shai Bolton (/ˈʃeɪ/ SHAY; born 8 December 1998) is an Australian rules footballer who plays for the Fremantle Football Club in the Australian Football League (AFL). Originally drafted by the Richmond Football Club with pick 29 in the 2016 national draft, Bolton played 135 games for Richmond and was a member of the club's 2019 and 2020 premiership teams before being traded to Fremantle at the end of the 2024 season.

Bolton is known for his ability to play as a forward and midfielder and developed into one of Richmond's most influential players during the early 2020s. In 2021, he won the Mark of the Year and in 2022 earned his first All-Australian team selection.

Before entering the AFL, Bolton played his junior football for South Fremantle and represented Western Australia at under-18 level. Following eight seasons at Richmond, he returned to his home state of Western Australia to play for Fremantle.

== Junior football and early life ==
Bolton was born in Katanning, Western Australia, and grew up in the southern Perth suburb of Forrestdale before spending his teenage years in Mandurah. He comes from strong footballing stock: his father, Darren, is a former Fremantle player (2 games) and Peel Thunder best & fairest winner.

In 2013, Bolton entered the elite talent pathway when he joined the Flying Boomerangs Indigenous Academy. He began playing underage football with WAFL club South Fremantle the following year. Bolton was sidelined for much of his 2015 season however after suffering stress fractures in his back. In his final season (2016) at the club, he averaged 17 disposals and two goals per game, including a seven-goal performance against East Perth.

He represented Western Australia at the 2016 AFL Under 18 Championships, kicking five goals in the tournament.

Bolton attended high school at Wesley College in Perth, leaving after completing his year 11 studies to focus on football. During his time at Wesley, he formed close friendships with future AFL players Sam Powell-Pepper and Quinton Narkle.

Prior to the 2016 national draft, Bolton was praised for his "blazing speed" and "natural instinct for the game". He impressed recruiters in October's pre-draft All Stars game at Punt Road Oval, recording 16 disposals, seven inside 50s and a goal. He placed second in the running vertical jump test at the national draft combine that year.

== AFL career ==
=== Richmond ===
==== 2017 season ====
Bolton was drafted by Richmond with the club's first pick and the 29th selection overall in the 2016 national draft.

Before the season had even officially began, Bolton was charged with striking Tom Williamson in a VFL practice match against the Northern Blues. He subsequently accepted a one-match ban. Bolton made his AFL debut in round 9, 2017 in a match against Greater Western Sydney at Spotless Stadium and taking the place of the injured Dan Butler in the Richmond forward-line. At 18 years and 163 days, he was the youngest player to debut for Richmond since captain Trent Cotchin in the 2008 season. He was thought to have kicked a match-winning goal in the final two minutes of the match, before an automatic review overturned the umpire's on-field decision and ruled the kick touched off the boot. Bolton played in each of the next two matches before Richmond's bye week in round 12. To that point he ranked fourth in the AFL for forward half pressure. In round 13 Bolton turned in an impressive first half against Sydney, racking up 12 disposals and two goals to half time. Though he did not finish strongly, it was nevertheless an "impressive" performance. His 8 'crumbs' in that match also tied the record for the four-year old stat set by Sydney's Josh Kennedy in 2016. He was rested from the club's AFL side in round 15 however, after backing up that match with a four disposal game against Carlton. Bolton returned to senior football in round 19 when he replaced the injured Jack Riewoldt, creating a forward-line without a recognised tall forward. He was dropped after just one match however, returning to the VFL to play out his season with the reserves. His performances at this level were labelled "above the level" by coach Craig McRae with media pundits suggesting he was close to a call-up to senior level during the AFL finals series. Despite this talk he would remain in the reserves, playing in each of the team's three victories as well as in their losing grand final against Port Melbourne. Champion Data figures released at the end of September showed Bolton as the second quickest player at Richmond and one of the 15 quickest in the AFL, after he set a top speed of 34.8 kilometres per hour in an in-match sprint during the season. Bolton finished the 2017 season having played six matches and kicked three goals at senior level. He also played 14 matches in the reserves and kicked 23 goals, good for the fourth most at the club.

==== 2018 season ====
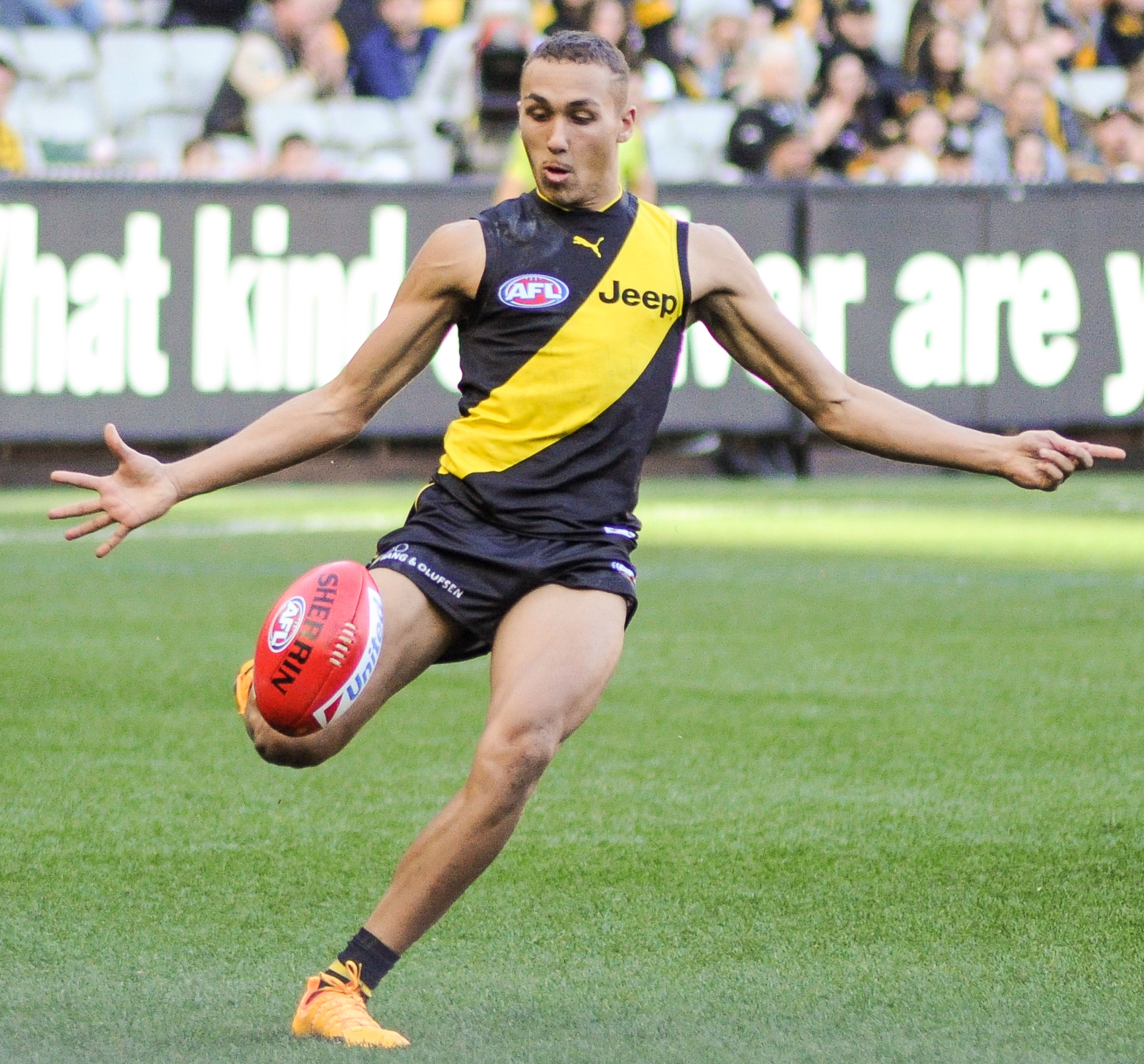
Bolton kicks during play in round 13, 2017

With premiership small forward Daniel Rioli still recovering from a serious foot injury, Bolton came out of a fitness-building off-season and straight into Richmond's senior forward line. He played in both of the club's official pre-season matches, including a three-goal tally in that series' first match against Essendon. On the back of those performances he was selected to play in the round 1 season-opener against Carlton. Bolton was relatively ineffectual over the season's first two matches however, recording only three tackles and one goal in total and was subsequently dropped from Richmond's round 3 side. Despite his inability to impact at senior level, Bolton was immediately impressive in his first reserves match of the season, kicking three goals in Richmond's VFL win over Port Melbourne. He remained at the lower level for a further six weeks until suffering a match-ending corked quad in the third quarter of a VFL win over Sandringham in late May. The club was cautious with Bolton's injury, resting him from match play for one week. Upon his return to VFL football he recorded 17 disposals while being trialed in limited midfield minutes. The following week Bolton kicked two goals against Williamstown but was most notable for a spectacular mark that saw him earn the VFL's Mark of the Year award at season's end. He would also earn the competition's Goal of the Year when he scored from the forward pocket after repeatedly shrugging tackles during a match against the Essendon reserves in early July. The goal, along with 22 disposals and eight tackles recorded in that win saw Bolton earn a second chance at AFL football in 2018. It would last just one match however, with Bolton immediately dropped back to VFL level following a goalless nine disposal performance in the round 17 loss to Greater Western Sydney. In his first two matches back at VFL level he was tried successfully in a half-back role, collecting 24 disposals while also rotating through the midfield in the second match of that short stretch. The experiment would not last long however, with Bolton sustaining a minor knee injury while training with the club in late July. Continued soreness in the joint saw Bolton undergo an arthroscope procedure, including a clean-up of the tissue around his meniscus. Bolton did not return to football in 2018, despite club officials earlier stating that he was likely to return in time for the VFL finals series. He finished the year having played three matches at AFL level and a further 13 with the club's reserves side in the VFL.

==== 2019 season ====
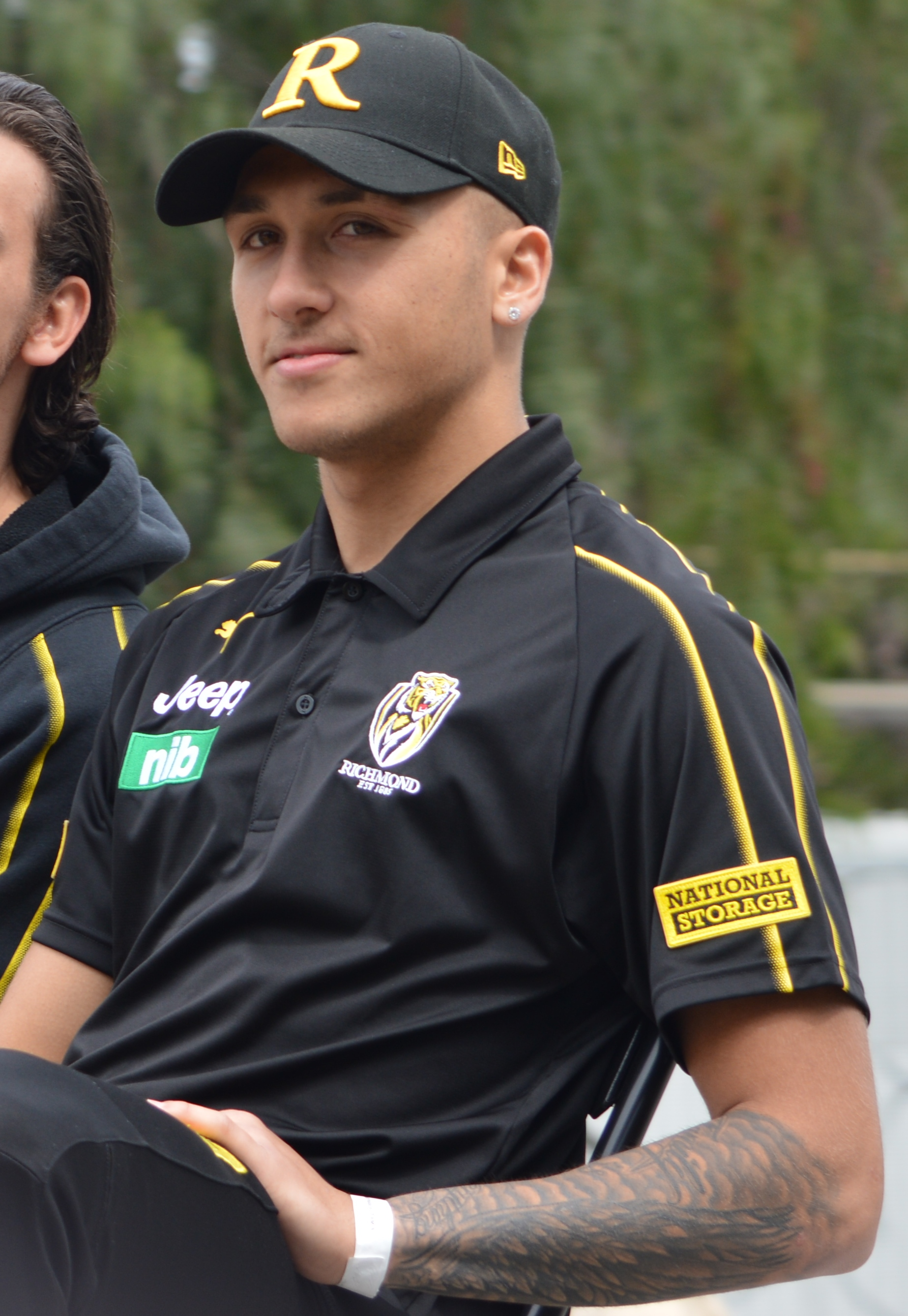
Bolton in the 2019 AFL Grand Final Parade

Bolton signed a new one-year contract with Richmond in the month following the end of the 2018 season, re-committing despite having previously put contract negotiations on hold during the season itself. He spent the off-season completing extensive personal fitness training, leading AFL Media and the Herald Sun to label Bolton likely to be one of Richmond's breakout players that season in a new role that would include playing time in the midfield and on the wing. He began the year playing that role in VFL practice matches in March, including a key role with two goals in the club's final pre-season match against Collingwood. Bolton's clearance work was fantastic as an inside midfielder in the VFL in early April, earning him a call up to his first AFL match of the year in round 4's match against Port Adelaide. He played as a forward in that and one further match at AFL level, before being dropped back to the VFL. It was to be a short stint however, with Bolton turning in a best on ground performance with 25 disposals, 11 tackles and a goal that saw him returned to AFL level in round 7. While he recorded a then career-best 17 disposals in that match, Bolton saved his breakout performance for the following week, where he kicked four goals and was among Richmond's best players in a five-goal win over Fremantle. For that performance he was also named in AFL Media's Team of the Week. Bolton kicked just one goal and averaged less than 11 disposals in the three weeks that followed, resulting in him being dropped to VFL level in the first week of June. He was immediately prolific at that level, playing as an inside midfielder and turning in two consecutive best afield performances in which he held averages of eight tackles, 30 disposals, nine clearances and a goal. Bolton was recalled to AFL level following those two matches and the club's mid-season bye, kicking one goal in a round 15 win over St Kilda. In round 16, he seized an opportunity to play as an inside midfielder for the first time at AFL level, recording 26 disposal, nine marks and two goals as one of his side's best players in a 92-point demolition of Gold Coast. At the point he ranked number one among the league's Rising Star eligible players for score involvements per game. Bolton kicked a goal and set a new career-best with 29 disposals while repeating his role as an inside midfielder in round 17's win over Greater Western Sydney. That effort earned him five Coaches award votes (equal 3rd best on ground), selection to AFL Media's Team of the Week and a nomination for the league's Rising Star award. He played one more game with significant midfield minutes, before being named by AFL Media as one of the club's best players in round 19's win over Collingwood while playing his early-season role as a forward.

Bolton played largely as a forward with limited midfield time for the final month of the season before making the 40-man squad but ultimately being passed over for final selection in the league's 22Under22 team which recognises the best young players in the league.

In the opening match of the club's finals campaign Bolton kicked one goal, had three goal assists and took a spectacular mark on top of Lions midfielder Lachie Neale in what would prove a 47-point qualifying final victory over the Brisbane Lions at The Gabba.

In the week that followed, Bolton signed a new two-year contract extension with Richmond, reportedly rejecting outside interest from home town side West Coast. Bolton followed his first finals effort with a considerably smaller output in the club's preliminary final victory over Geelong, kicking just a single behind and failing to lay a tackle in that match. In the grand final, Bolton helped his side to an AFL premiership by recording 11 disposals, kicking one goal and applying immense forward-half pressure in what AFL Media labelled a "solid" game.

Bolton led the club for total goal assists (five) during the finals series while placing second at the club and equal 12th among all players in the competition by the same measure across the entirety of 2019. He finished what The Age and the Australian Associated Press labelled a "breakout" season by winning an AFL premiership, receiving five Brownlow Medal votes (fifth most among Richmond players) and placing 18th in the club's best and fairest count.

==== 2020 season ====
Bolton received Richmond life membership in 2019/20 off-season for his contribution to the club's 2019 premiership win, but also underwent minor shoulder surgery that saw him on a non-contact pre-season training program through mid-February 2020. He resumed his place in the club's best 22 in two pre-season matches against Collingwood and Greater Western Sydney in March before kicking an equal team-high three goals in a round 1 win over Carlton. He also recorded 13 disposals in that match, which was played without a crowd in attendance due to public health prohibitions on large gatherings imposed as a result of the rapid progression of the coronavirus pandemic into Australia.

It was the first match of a reduced 17-round season, which was also played with quarter lengths reduced by one fifth in order to reduce the physical load on players who would be expected to play multiple matches with short breaks in the second half of the year. Just three days later, the AFL Commission suspended the season for an indefinite period after multiple states enforced quarantine conditions on their borders that effectively ruled out the possibility of continuing the season as planned. Bolton contributed one goal when the season resumed in June after an 11-week hiatus, before adding a further three goals across rounds 3 and 4 to lead all Richmond players with seven goals so far that season.

With the news that the club would soon be relocated to the Gold Coast in response to a virus outbreak in Melbourne, and with the knowledge that senior midfielder Shane Edwards would not travel with his teammates, the club opted to send Bolton to the reserves level during the weekend of round 5 to play as an inside midfielder in preparation to play the role at senior level. Bolton was prolific in that unofficial scratch match against Melbourne's reserves, earning a recall as an AFL midfielder in the following week's match against Sydney on Richmond's new home of the Gold Coast. The Herald Sun labelled Bolton one of his side's best with 14 disposals and a goal in that game, and one week later he received six Coaches Association Award votes for an equal-second-best on ground performance that included 19 disposals and five clearances.

Bolton continued to be among his side's best players over the next month, adding hauls of four, two and eight coaches votes for midfield contributions in rounds 8, 9 and 10 respectively. After round 11, Bolton ranked first among all players in the league that season for total inside-50s (48) and first at Richmond for centre clearances (18) and score involvements (58).

In round 13, Bolton was best on ground in Richmond's Dreamtime in Darwin win over Essendon while the team wore an Indigenous artwork guernsey he had designed with the help of his family. He received the Yiooken Award for a performance, which included a then-equal career-high 29 disposals, along with five clearances and a goal. After earning another three coaches votes as equal-third best on ground with 18 disposals in a round 17 win over Geelong, Bolton missed the season-ending round 18 match against Adelaide with a corked calf. Across the final 12 rounds of the season, he had ranked fifth and sixth respectively for inside-50s and total score involvements among all players in the league. At the end of the regular season, Bolton placed second among Richmond players with nine Brownlow Medal votes, was one of Richmond's three nominees for the AFL Players' Association's league MVP award and was nominated as a midfielder in the 22under22 squad that recognises the best young players in the league, though ultimately went unselected in the final team of the fan-voted award.

Bolton returned in the first week of the finals but with fewer midfield minutes owing to the return of Shane Edwards and Dion Prestia in their own midfield roles. He notched 17 disposals in the first up qualifying final loss to the Brisbane Lions, before kicking a match-high three goals in a semi-final win over St Kilda which led to AFL Media labelling him as "on the verge of stardom". In a preliminary final win over Port Adelaide the following week, Bolton made a strong contribution of 15 disposals and six score involvements. Bolton became a dual premiership player one week later, recording four goal assists, 16 disposals and an equal match-high seven tackles. The Age noted Bolton's performance saying Richmond's 31-point victory "came on the back of (his) brilliant second half". He recorded coaches votes for the third consecutive match, earning tenth place overall in the Gary Ayres award for the player of the finals.

In addition to premiership silverware, Bolton earned the Fred Swift medal for fourth place in the club's best and fairest award. At the end of the year, Bolton ranked fifth among midfielder/forwards and 35th overall in the Herald Sun's list of the best players from the 2020 season.

==== 2021 season ====
Bolton played well in both of Richmond’s two wins to open the 2021 season, with 25 touches and a goal and 20 disposals against Carlton and Hawthorn respectively. He was quiet in the shock loss to Sydney in round 3 but was one of the Tiges’ best in the subsequent 2-point defeat against Port. Those losses set the tone for an inconsistent Richmond season, as they would go on to win just 7 more games amongst 10 more losses and a final-round draw, to finish 12th and miss the finals for the first time since 2016.

Bolton’s form was good though, as he saw increasing midfield time. He recorded 20+ disposals in the next four games, with 29 disposals and 8 clearances against St. Kilda in Round 5 earning Bolton 2 Brownlow Medal votes; he got another 2 votes with 22 disposals, 10 inside-50s and 3 goals in a low-scoring win over the Bulldogs in Round 7. Bolton’s performance was one of the few Richmond positives as Geelong thrashed them by 63 points in Round 8. Shai leapt on Mark Blicavs to take a towering grab, which became the 2021 AFL Mark of the Year. Bolton had 22 touches, 5 clearances and kicked 3 goals in the game to be Richmond’s best on an otherwise dismal night for the Tigers.

Shai Bolton takes the 2021 AFL Mark of the Year, 7 May.

In the following week, Bolton sustained a fractured wrist in a nightclub altercation when he stepped in to defend team-mate Daniel Rioli. Bolton apologised for ‘resorting to violence’, made a 20K donation to charity and missed the next two games with the injury. He returned in round 11 and the good form continued, with 20+ disposals and 5 goals in total across the next three games as the Tigers clung on to 8th place on the ladder. Bolton’s form dipped in Round 15 as the Tigers could only manage 2 goals in total in a shock hammering at the hands of St. Kilda. The Tigers would go on to lose the next two games in a four-loss run which saw them slump to 12th. Bolton’s form picked up though, he was Richmond’s best player in a Round 17 loss to Collingwood, with 26 disposals, 8 clearances and a goal . He played well again in Round 18 (22 disposals, a goal) as the Tigers broke the losing run with a 20-point win over Brisbane in Jack Riewoldt’s 300th game. Bolton’s form dipped a little over the final 5 games, he didn’t break the 20-disposal mark in any of them but did manage 2 goals in each of the final two games of the season.

At the end of the season, Bolton signed a 2-year contract extension with Richmond worth an estimated AUD600K p.a., resisting reported overtures from both WA clubs and Essendon. “I am happy to be at Tigerland. I have been so excited to be staying (because) I love all the boys here,” Bolton said. Overall, Bolton finished 2021 averaging 19.6 disposals per game – the best of his career to date – was the team’s 3rd-highest goal-scorer with 23 and, for the second consecutive year, finished fourth in Richmond’s best-and-fairest to win the Fred Swift Medal.

==== 2022 season ====
Bolton's 2022 established him as one of the emerging stars of the game. Bolton became recognized for his silky skills, impact on matches, and ability to stand up in big moments in the frequent absence of Richmond star Dustin Martin. Bolton kicked 10 goals across the first four games of the year and averaged 17 disposals as the Tigers began 2-2. Following a rare quiet game against reigning premiers Melbourne in Round 6, Bolton responded with 30 disposals, 3 goals and 15 ‘score involvements’ in Richmond’s 109-point thumping of the Eagles, later earning Bolton 2 Brownlow votes. It was a key effort with team leaders Cotchin and Martin absent through injury. The win commenced a good run for the Tigers who won five of the next six games. Bolton bagged 2 goals in each of the three wins following the Eagles game, with an average of 19 disposals. Bolton contributed to some Tigers ill-discipline in a narrow loss to the Swans in Round 11, conceding a 50m penalty and goal in a relatively modest personal effort, but his form was strong thereon. Highlights included 29 disposals and 3 goals in a 2-point loss to the Suns and 24 touches, 2 goals and 7 inside-50s in a Round 20 comeback win over Brisbane which earned Bolton 3 Brownlow votes, the first ‘3-voter’ of his career. Bolton courted controversy in Round 24 for taunting Carlton's Sam Docherty. Bolton apologized to Docherty after the game but still earned criticism from many, including his own coach Damien Hardwick. The Tigers ended up finishing 7th but lost a close elimination final against Brisbane at the Gabba, a game in which Bolton was tagged for one of the first times, limited to 10 disposals but managing 2 goals.

Overall Bolton produced some career-best figures in 2022, playing every game he averaged 17.6 disposals (slightly down on 2021) but kicked 43 goals, second-highest for Richmond behind Tom Lynch and 17th in the league overall. Bolton was ranked third in the AFL for score involvements (169) and 11th for centre-clearances (54). His season was recognized with selection in the 2022 All-Australian team on a half-forward flank, the only Richmond player selected that year. Bolton also finished third in the AFL Player’s Association Most Valuable Player Award and collected a career-high 12 Brownlow votes, third-best for Richmond. At club level, Bolton tied for fourth in Richmond’s Best-and-Fairest and collected his third Fred Swift Medal. Late in the year Bolton signed a contract extension with Richmond to the end of the 2028 season. “I have loved the club since I got drafted. I love the culture here, all the boys, the coaching staff and playing at the MCG,” Bolton said. “It was pretty easy to decide in the end … I am super excited to stay here.” Tigers captain Dylan Grimes said “We saw glimpses really early on of what (Bolton) could do, but to see him back that up with some consistency, then obviously grow his game to new heights was special to watch.”

=== Fremantle ===
==== 2025 season ====
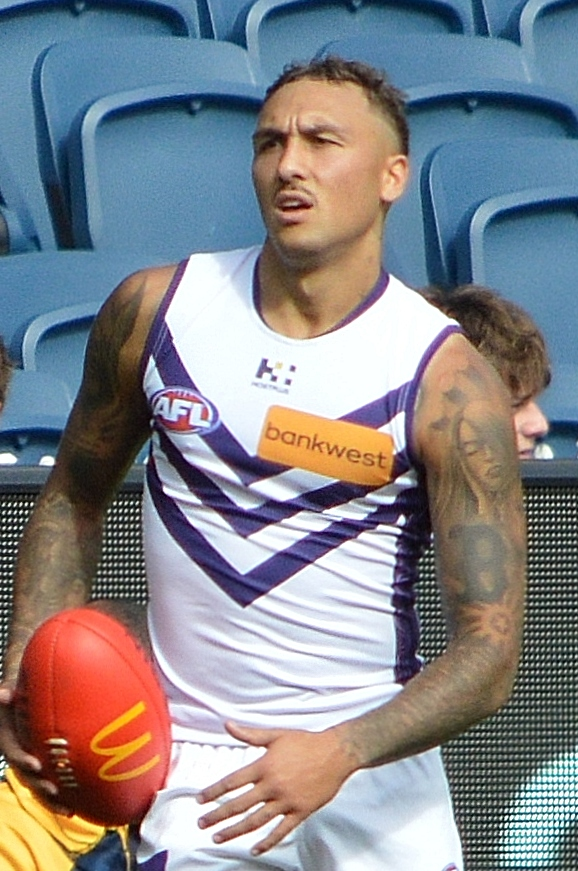
Bolton with Fremantle in April 2025

Following the 2024 AFL season, Bolton requested a trade home to Western Australia. He was traded to Fremantle on the final day of the trade period, signing a five-year deal with the Dockers.Bolton played his first game for Fremantle in Round 2 of the 2025 AFL season against Sydney at Optus Stadium. He was arguably the best player on ground in Round 10 against Greater Western Sydney at Engie Stadium, collecting 24 disposals and kicking three goals. He was awarded a perfect 10 coaches' votes after the match. Bolton finished his first season in the West playing 23 out of 24 possible games and kicking 28 goals. This meant he finished 5th in the leading goal kicker and didn't make the top ten of the Doig Medal.

==== 2026 season ====
After the retirement of club legend Michael Walters, Bolton changed from jumper number 15 to 10. In Round 2, Bolton made the move to a more midfield-based role and in consecutive weeks gathered more than 30 disposals. In Round 7, Bolton was awarded the Arthur Leggett Medal for best-afield in Fremantle's annual Len Hall Tribute Game on ANZAC Day, recording 33 disposals, 9 inside 50s, and kicking 2 goals.

On top of his second All-Australian Blazer, Bolton was awarded the Norm Smith Medal in the 2026 Grand Final as Best on Ground in a losing effort for Fremantle, becoming the first since Chris Judd of the West Coast Eagles in 2005 to be awarded from the losing team and the first Fremantle Docker to win the medal.

== Player profile ==
Bolton plays as an inside midfielder and rests as a small forward, after playing most of his first three seasons at AFL level exclusively as a small forward. He is notable for his explosive athletic attributes and creativity in contested ball situations.

== Statistics ==
Updated to the end of the preliminary final, 2026.

Legend
G	Goals	K	Kicks	D	Disposals	T	Tackles
B	Behinds	H	Handballs	M	Marks

Season	Team	No.	Games	Totals							Averages (per game)							Votes
Season	Team	No.	Games	G	B	K	H	D	M	T	G	B	K	H	D	M	T	Votes
2017	Richmond	29	6	3	4	26	25	51	12	15	0.5	0.7	4.3	4.2	8.5	2.0	2.5	0
2018	Richmond	29	3	1	1	11	14	25	6	4	0.3	0.3	3.7	4.7	8.3	2.0	1.3	0
2019^{#}	Richmond	29	19	15	12	143	123	266	58	65	0.8	0.6	7.5	6.5	14.0	3.1	3.4	5
2020^{#}	Richmond	29	19	15	11	181	120	301	58	54	0.8	0.6	9.5	6.3	15.8	3.1	2.8	9
2021	Richmond	29	20	23	20	208	185	393	82	55	1.2	1.0	10.4	9.3	19.7	4.1	2.8	5
2022	Richmond	29	23	43	41	256	147	403	73	48	1.9	1.8	11.1	6.4	17.5	3.2	2.1	12
2023	Richmond	29	23	31	29	315	185	500	79	70	1.3	1.3	13.7	8.0	21.7	3.4	3.0	14
2024	Richmond	29	22	34	26	218	151	369	83	57	1.5	1.2	9.9	6.9	16.8	3.8	2.6	5
2025	Fremantle	15	23	28	29	226	186	412	65	60	1.2	1.3	9.8	8.1	17.9	2.8	2.6	0
2026	Fremantle	10	25	25	13	303	264	567	69	92	1.0	0.5	12.1	10.6	22.7	2.8	3.7	15
Career			183	218	186	1887	1400	3287	585	520	1.2	1.0	10.3	7.7	18.0	3.2	2.8	65

== Honours and achievements ==
Team

- 2× AFL premiership player (Richmond): 2019, 2020
- 2× AFL minor premiership: (Richmond): 2018, (Fremantle): 2026
- McClelland Trophy (Richmond): 2018

Individual

- Norm Smith Medal: 2026
- 2× All-Australian team: 2022, 2026
- AFL Rising Star nominee: 2019
- Mark of the Year: 2021
- Yiooken Award: 2020
- Arthur Leggett Medal: 2026
- Michael Roach Medal (Richmond leading goalkicker): 2024

VFL

- Goal of the Year: 2018
- Mark of the Year: 2018

== Personal life ==
Bolton is an Indigenous Australian of the Noongar people. He is the son of former Fremantle player Darren Bolton and is related to the famous Pickett (mother's family) and Krakouer (maternal grandmother) footballing families.
