= Brent Daniels =

Australian rules footballer (born 1999)

Personal information
- Born: 9 March 1999 (age 27)
- Original team: Bendigo Pioneers (TAC Cup)/Geelong Grammar
- Draft: Pick 27, 2017 national draft
- Debut: 8 July 2018, Greater Western Sydney vs. West Coast, at Perth Stadium
- Height: 172 cm (5 ft 8 in)
- Weight: 72 kg (159 lb)
- Position: Small forward

Club information
- Current club: Greater Western Sydney
- Number: 16

Playing career^{1}
Years	Club	Games (Goals)
2018–	Greater Western Sydney	122 (83)
- ^{1} Playing statistics correct to the end of round 22, 2026.

Career highlights
- AFL Rising Star nominee: 2019

Brent Daniels (born 9 March 1999) is a professional Australian rules footballer playing for the Greater Western Sydney Giants in the Australian Football League (AFL). He made his debut in round 16 of the 2018 season against the West Coast Eagles at Perth Stadium.

== Early life ==
Daniels grew up in Swan Hill and played junior football for Nyah-Nyah West United. He boarded at Geelong Grammar School with fellow footballers and friends Paddy Dow, Lochie O'Brien and Jarrod Brander. Daniels played cricket and football for the school teams. He also played football for the Bendigo Pioneers in the TAC Cup and for Vic Country in the AFL Under 18 Championships. Daniels missed the second half of the 2016 season with a knee injury. He tested at the 2017 AFL Draft Combine and recorded the third-best time of 8.11 seconds in the agility test. Sports journalist Callum Twomey in 2017 commented that Daniels's "mix of agility, endurance and pace ... stand out."

== AFL career ==
Daniels was drafted by the GWS Giants with pick 27 in the 2017 national draft, but suffered a meniscus tear in December which was expected to sideline him for ten to twelve weeks. He spent a month in the North East Australian Football League before his round 16 debut. Coach Leon Cameron said "He’s got great tackle pressure, chase pressure and we like that ... he can hit the scoreboard, he’s a very good front and square player". For the 2019 season Daniels was the 2nd shortest player in the AFL. Daniels received a 2019 AFL Rising Star nomination in round 23 against Gold Coast, collecting 20 disposals and kicking 2 goals. In the 2019 AFL Semi Final against the Brisbane Lions, Daniels kicked the match winning goal in the dying minutes of the game to give Greater Western Sydney a spot in the Preliminary Final against Collingwood. Daniels played in the team which lost the 2019 Grand Final to Richmond. He missed the entirety of the 2022 season due to hamstring injuries, keeping him from playing an AFL game for 590 days.

Daniels played his 100th AFL game in what was a career-best 2024, and was selected in the 2024 All-Australian squad of 44, with many experts predicting a first-ever All-Australian blazer for the small forward. Only a few days later, Daniels signed a contract extension until the end of 2031, turning his back on 2025 free agency.

== Statistics ==
Updated to the end of round 22, 2026.

Legend
G	Goals	K	Kicks	D	Disposals	T	Tackles
B	Behinds	H	Handballs	M	Marks

Season	Team	No.	Games	Totals							Averages (per game)							Votes
Season	Team	No.	Games	G	B	K	H	D	M	T	G	B	K	H	D	M	T	Votes
2018	Greater Western Sydney	16	7	4	3	26	38	64	11	21	0.6	0.4	3.7	5.4	9.1	1.6	3.0	0
2019	Greater Western Sydney	16	26	11	20	200	180	380	80	81	0.4	0.8	7.7	6.9	14.6	3.1	3.1	0
2020 (Note: The 2020 season was played with 17 home-and-away matches per team (down from 22) and 16-minute quarters with time on (down from 20-minute quarters with time on) due to the impact of the COVID-19 pandemic.)	Greater Western Sydney	16	16	5	8	100	94	194	31	42	0.3	0.5	6.3	5.9	12.1	1.9	2.6	2
2021	Greater Western Sydney	16	13	2	4	91	86	177	22	35	0.2	0.3	7.0	6.6	13.6	1.7	2.7	0
2022	Greater Western Sydney	16	0	—	—	—	—	—	—	—	—	—	—	—	—	—	—	0
2023	Greater Western Sydney	16	20	26	14	196	140	336	54	66	1.3	0.7	9.8	7.0	16.8	2.7	3.3	0
2024	Greater Western Sydney	16	24	23	18	258	170	428	77	112	1.0	0.8	10.8	7.1	17.8	3.2	4.7	0
2025	Greater Western Sydney	16	6	1	2	33	42	75	11	16	0.2	0.3	5.5	7.0	12.5	1.8	2.7	0
2026	Greater Western Sydney	16	10	11	1	94	84	178	25	39	1.1	0.1	9.4	8.4	17.8	2.5	3.9	0
Career			122	83	70	998	834	1832	311	412	0.7	0.6	8.2	6.8	15.0	2.5	3.4	2
