= 2026 AFL Origin =

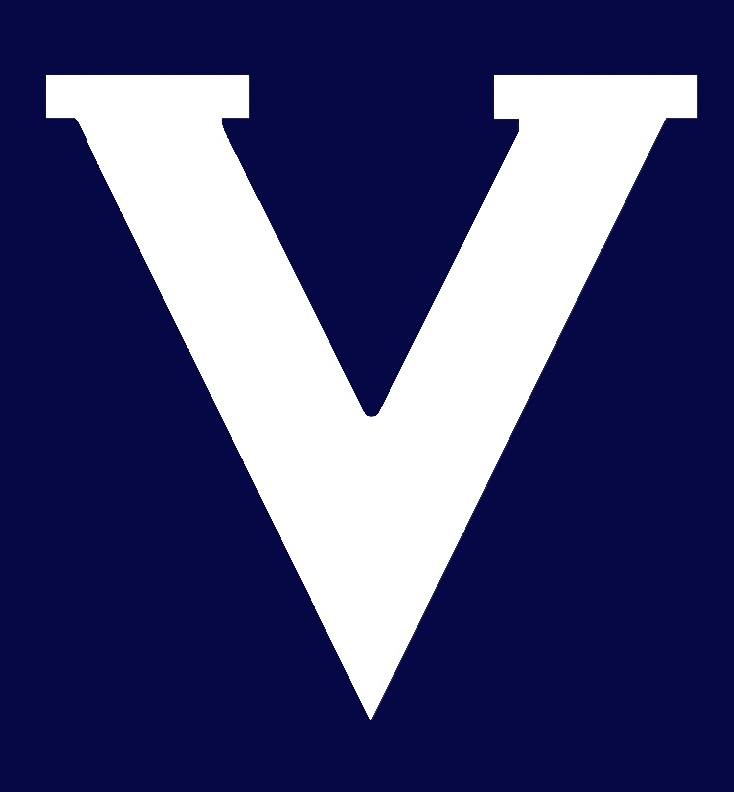
Western Australia	Victoria
15.11 (101)	18.17 (125)
	1	2	3	4
WA	3.1 (19)	8.4 (52)	11.6 (72)	15.11 (101)
VIC	6.3 (39)	11.8 (74)	15.11 (101)	18.17 (125)
- Date: 14 February 2026
- Stadium: Optus Stadium
- Attendance: 58,141
- Favourite: Victoria

The 2026 AFL Origin match was an Australian rules football match held in accordance with State of Origin selection criteria between two representative sides organised by the Australian Football League (AFL).

It was played on 14 February 2026 at Optus Stadium in Perth, between Western Australia and Victoria. The match, which was organised in partnership with the West Australian government, was Western Australia's first appearance in a state of origin match since 1998, Victoria's first since 2020, and the first match between the two states since 1992.

Attended by a sold-out crowd of 58,141 spectators, the contest was won by Victoria by 24 points. The success of the match, in terms of player participation and spectator interest, led to calls to make representative football an annual occasion at the start of each AFL season.

== Teams ==
The AFL staggered the names of players selected for the two teams over the off-season. On 14 November 2025, the AFL announced the first group of eight players to compete for the Western Australian and Victorian teams, which included club captains Patrick Cripps (Western Australia) and Marcus Bontempelli (Victoria).

Players were, in most cases, eligible to play for the state they were drafted from, along with the state they played the majority of their junior football. Brisbane Lions star midfielder Will Ashcroft, despite captaining Victoria at junior level and being drafted from the state, was ruled ineligible for selection due to being part of the league's Gold Coast Suns Academy program. Melbourne forward Kysaiah Pickett, who was drafted from the Woodville-West Torrens Football Club in South Australia and did not play his junior football in Western Australia, was selected for Western Australia on the basis that he was predominantly raised in Quairading, and identified as a Noongar man.

Both teams had late withdrawals due to injuries, with Brandon Starcevich withdrawn for Western Australia and Jeremy Cameron for Victoria. Guernsey numbers were announced on 9 February 2026, with most players allocated the numbers that they wore at their respective clubs; however, as there were several cases of multiple players wearing the same number, a rule was instigated where if multiple players requested the same number, the deciding factor was the number of games played in that number.

Western Australia

Coach: Dean Cox ( Sydney)

No.	Player	Club
1.	Jaeger O'Meara	Fremantle
2.	Luke Jackson	Fremantle
3.	Stephen Coniglio	Greater Western Sydney
4.	Callum Ah Chee	Adelaide
5.	Chad Warner	Sydney
6.	Jordan Clark	Fremantle
7.	Rory Lobb	Western Bulldogs
8.	Shai Bolton	Fremantle
9.	Patrick Cripps (c)	Carlton
10.	Bradley Hill	St Kilda
14.	Darcy Cameron	Collingwood
15.	Sam Taylor	Greater Western Sydney
17.	Lawson Humphries	Geelong
19.	Mitch Georgiades	Port Adelaide
21.	Jesse Hogan	Greater Western Sydney
23.	Charlie Cameron	Brisbane Lions
24.	Trent Rivers	Melbourne
27.	Wil Powell	Gold Coast
33.	Aaron Naughton	Western Bulldogs
35.	Nathan Broad	Richmond
36.	Kysaiah Pickett	Melbourne
37.	Tom Barrass	Hawthorn
44.	Tim English	Western Bulldogs
45.	Jake Waterman	West Coast
48.	Liam Baker	West Coast
—	~~Brandon Starcevich~~	~~West Coast~~

Victoria

Coach: Chris Scott ( Geelong)

No.	Player	Club
1.	Toby Greene	Greater Western Sydney
2.	Jack Sinclair	St Kilda
3.	Caleb Serong	Fremantle
4.	Marcus Bontempelli (c)	Western Bulldogs
6.	Hugh McCluggage	Brisbane Lions
7.	Zach Merrett	Essendon
8.	Nick Daicos	Collingwood
9.	Zak Butters	Port Adelaide
10.	Sam Darcy	Western Bulldogs
11.	Max Gawn	Melbourne
12.	Lachie Ash	Greater Western Sydney
13.	Blake Hardwick	Hawthorn
14.	Max Holmes	Geelong
15.	Noah Anderson	Gold Coast
18.	Matt Rowell	Gold Coast
19.	Jack Gunston	Hawthorn
20.	Ed Richards	Western Bulldogs
23.	Jacob Weitering	Carlton
24.	Josh Battle	Hawthorn
25.	Sam Collins	Gold Coast
33.	Bailey Smith	Geelong
34.	Ben King	Gold Coast
35.	Patrick Dangerfield	Geelong
38.	Tristan Xerri	North Melbourne
44.	Tom Stewart	Geelong
—	~~Jeremy Cameron~~	~~Geelong~~

== Match summary ==
The match was played in very warm conditions, with the temperature reaching 35 degrees Celsius approximately one hour before the match began, and cooling mildly throughout the evening.

=== First quarter ===
Western Australia opened the contest strongly, with Chad Warner kicking the opening goal before Jesse Hogan claimed a contested mark in the goal-square to get the home side off to a perfect start. Victoria responded with Ben King among the early goalkickers, while Marcus Bontempelli contributed both as a ball-winner and a forward target. The Big V gradually gained control of the contest and finished the quarter with six goals to Western Australia's three, establishing a 20-point lead. Zach Merrett soccered a goal and Hugh McCluggage added a major with a well-executed snap approaching the first break. The quarter was marred by a serious collision involving Victorian defender Jacob Weitering and Western Australian forward Mitch Georgiades, after which Weitering was stretchered from the field following a lengthy delay.

=== Second quarter ===
Victoria extended its lead early in the second quarter through a long-range goal from midfielder Nick Daicos, taking the margin to 27 points. Western Australia responded with a sustained period of pressure, driven by Warner's increasing influence in the midfield and Kysaiah Pickett's defensive pressure around the forward line. The home side kicked three goals in succession to reduce the deficit to nine points, briefly threatening to take control of the match. Victoria steadied, however, and restored its advantage before half-time. Tristan Xerri kicked a goal from a free kick following an infringement of the stand rule, while McCluggage added another major late in the quarter. Victoria went into the main break 22 points ahead.

=== Third quarter ===
The match was an open and free-flowing affair after half-time, with both teams producing attacking passages and periods of momentum. Victoria maintained its advantage through its midfield depth and forward efficiency, while Western Australia relied on the running ability of Warner and Bradley Hill to generate scoring opportunities. Hogan continued to provide a strong target inside 50, and Shai Bolton and Luke Jackson helped lift the home crowd with consecutive goals. Victoria nevertheless outscored Western Australia during the quarter, kicking four goals to three to extend its lead to 29 points at the final change. Western Australian defenders Sam Taylor and Callum Ah Chee were among the players affected by hamstring concerns, while Victorian midfielder Matt Rowell also finished his match early with a finger injury.

=== Fourth quarter ===
Western Australia launched a determined comeback in the final quarter, with Hogan taking a series of strong marks inside 50 and kicking three quick goals as part of a four-goal burst. Charlie Cameron also contributed to the revival, kicking a running snap goal to reduce the margin to just six points with 17 minutes remaining. The momentum at Optus Stadium shifted towards the home side, raising the prospect of a remarkable comeback. Victoria responded through Patrick Dangerfield, who kicked a long-range goal from approximately 50 metres to halt Western Australia's run. Caleb Serong then snapped a crucial goal, before Merrett added another to seal the win for the visitors. Victoria kicked the final three goals of the match to finish with a 24-point victory, despite Western Australia's strong late challenge getting the home side within a goal.

=== Best on ground ===
Hogan was Western Australia's leading goalkicker with five goals and was awarded the Graham Moss Medal as the state's best player. Cameron kicked three goals, while Jake Waterman and Jackson contributed two apiece. Warner was among Western Australia's most influential midfielders, supported by Hill and defender Tom Barrass. For Victoria, King kicked four goals, while Merrett, McCluggage, Toby Greene and Dangerfield each kicked two. Daicos led all players with 38 disposals and seven clearances, while Bontempelli recorded 30 disposals and 10 marks. Amidst some controversy owing to Daicos' dominance in terms of possessions, rebounding defender Lachie Ash received the E. J. Whitten Medal as Victoria's best player, collecting 25 disposals and providing significant drive from defence.

== Scorecard ==
2026 AFL Origin
Saturday, 14 February; 4:40 pm (AWST)	Western Australia	def. by	Victoria	Optus Stadium (crowd: 58,141)
3.1 (19); 8.4 (52); 11.6 (72); 15.11 (101)	Q1; Q2; Q3; Final	6.3 (39); 11.8 (74); 15.11 (101); 18.17 (125)	Umpires: Meredith, Meyer, Mollison, Stephens; Graham Moss Medal (Western Australia) & E.J. Whitten Medal (Victoria): Jesse Hogan (Western Australia) & Lachie Ash (Victoria)
Hogan 5 Cameron 3 Waterman, Jackson 2 Warner, Hill, Bolton 1	Goals	King 4 Merrett, McCluggage, Greene, Dangerfield 2 Xerri, Smith, Serong, Daicos, Butters, Bontempelli 1
Hogan, Warner, Barrass, Hill, Baker, Bolton	Best	Daicos, Bontempelli, Serong, King, Butters, Ash, Stewart
Georgiades (hamstring), Taylor (hamstring), Ah Chee (hamstring)	Injuries	Weitering (shoulder/ribs), Rowell (finger)
As the winning team, Victoria was awarded the Graham 'Polly' Farmer Cup, a trophy introduced by the AFL to recognise the achievements of the late Polly Farmer, who played 356 games in the WAFL and the VFL between 1953 and 1971, and is a legend in the Australian Football Hall of Fame.

== See also ==
- 2026 AFL season
- Interstate matches in Australian rules football
- List of VFL/AFL and AFL Women's players from Western Australia
