= Lachie Ash =

Australian rules footballer (born 2001)

- Ash in 2025

Personal information
- Full name: Lachlan Ash
- Born: 21 June 2001 (age 25); Katandra, Victoria
- Original teams: Katandra, Shepparton, Murray Bushrangers
- Draft: No. 4, 2019 national draft
- Debut: 19 June 2020, Greater Western Sydney vs. Western Bulldogs, at Marvel Stadium
- Height: 188 cm (6 ft 2 in)
- Weight: 80 kg (176 lb)
- Position: Defender

Club information
- Current club: Greater Western Sydney
- Number: 7

Playing career^{1}
Years	Club	Games (Goals)
2020–	Greater Western Sydney	146 (9)

Representative team honours^{2}
Years	Team	Games (Goals)
2026	Victoria	1 (0)
- ^{1} Playing statistics correct to the end of round 22, 2026.^{2} Representative statistics correct as of 2026.

Career highlights
- All-Australian team: 2026; Kevin Sheedy Medal: 2026; E.J. Whitten Medal: 2026; Greater Western Sydney Rising Star: 2020

Lachlan Ash (born 21 June 2001) is an Australian rules footballer who plays for the Greater Western Sydney Giants in the Australian Football League (AFL). He was recruited by the Greater Western Sydney Giants with the 4th draft pick in the 2019 AFL draft.

== Early football ==
Ash was born in Katandra, Victoria where he participated in the Auskick program. He played junior football in Katandra Football Club and senior football at the Shepparton Football Club, where we won a senior premiership at the age of 17. Ash represented Vic Country at the AFL Under 18 Championships for the 2018 and 2019 seasons. He also played for the Murray Bushrangers for two seasons in the NAB League.

== AFL career ==
Ash debuted in the Giants' 24-point loss against the Western Bulldogs in the third round of the 2020 AFL season. Ash collected seven disposals and three marks. Ash took home the club's Rising Star award at the conclusion of the season, and had a career-best game in his team's 39-point loss to rivals Western Bulldogs in the 6th round of the 2021 AFL season, where he collected 35 disposals and 15 marks to be one of the Greater Western Sydney's best on ground that game.

In 2023, Ash adopted a new role under coach Adam Kingsley as a lethal running defender which resulted in a two-year contract extension. He played a career-best 26 games that season as the Giants made a deep run into the finals series. Running out of the defensive 50 alongside Lachie Whitfield, Ash began to epitomise Kingsley's "Orange Tsunami" game style.

In 2025, Ash averaged 28 disposals and became the Giants' premier half-back. He was rewarded with a selection in the 2025 All-Australian squad, but did not make the final team.

In February 2026, Ash played in the 2026 AFL Origin, representing Victoria in their win against Western Australia. Ash was voted as the best on ground for Victoria in the match, winning the E.J. Whitten Medal.

2026 saw Ash enjoy his most successful year at the Giants to date, winning the Kevin Sheedy Medal, the Giants' Best and fairest award, and earning selection at half-back in the 2026 All-Australian team.

== Statistics ==
Updated to the end of round 22, 2026.

Legend
G	Goals	K	Kicks	D	Disposals	T	Tackles
B	Behinds	H	Handballs	M	Marks

Season	Team	No.	Games	Totals							Averages (per game)							Votes
Season	Team	No.	Games	G	B	K	H	D	M	T	G	B	K	H	D	M	T	Votes
2020 (Note: The 2020 season was played with 17 home-and-away matches per team (down from 22) and 16-minute quarters with time on (down from 20-minute quarters with time on) due to the impact of the COVID-19 pandemic.)	Greater Western Sydney	7	12	1	0	79	57	136	31	22	0.1	0.0	6.6	4.8	11.3	2.6	1.8	0
2021	Greater Western Sydney	7	23	1	1	265	127	392	111	63	0.0	0.0	11.5	5.5	17.0	4.8	2.7	0
2022	Greater Western Sydney	7	21	2	7	206	132	338	97	54	0.1	0.3	9.8	6.3	16.1	4.6	2.6	0
2023	Greater Western Sydney	7	26	2	1	403	220	623	140	40	0.1	0.0	15.5	8.5	24.0	5.4	1.5	0
2024	Greater Western Sydney	7	19	1	1	243	143	386	101	33	0.1	0.1	12.8	7.5	20.3	5.3	1.7	0
2025	Greater Western Sydney	7	24	1	1	443	226	669	149	49	0.0	0.0	18.5	9.4	27.9	6.2	2.0	7
2026	Greater Western Sydney	7	21	1	2	391	207	598	150	31	0.0	0.1	18.6	9.9	28.5	7.1	1.5	0
Career			146	9	13	2030	1112	3142	779	292	0.1	0.1	13.9	7.6	21.5	5.3	2.0	7
