= Aaron Naughton =

Australian rules footballer (born 1999)

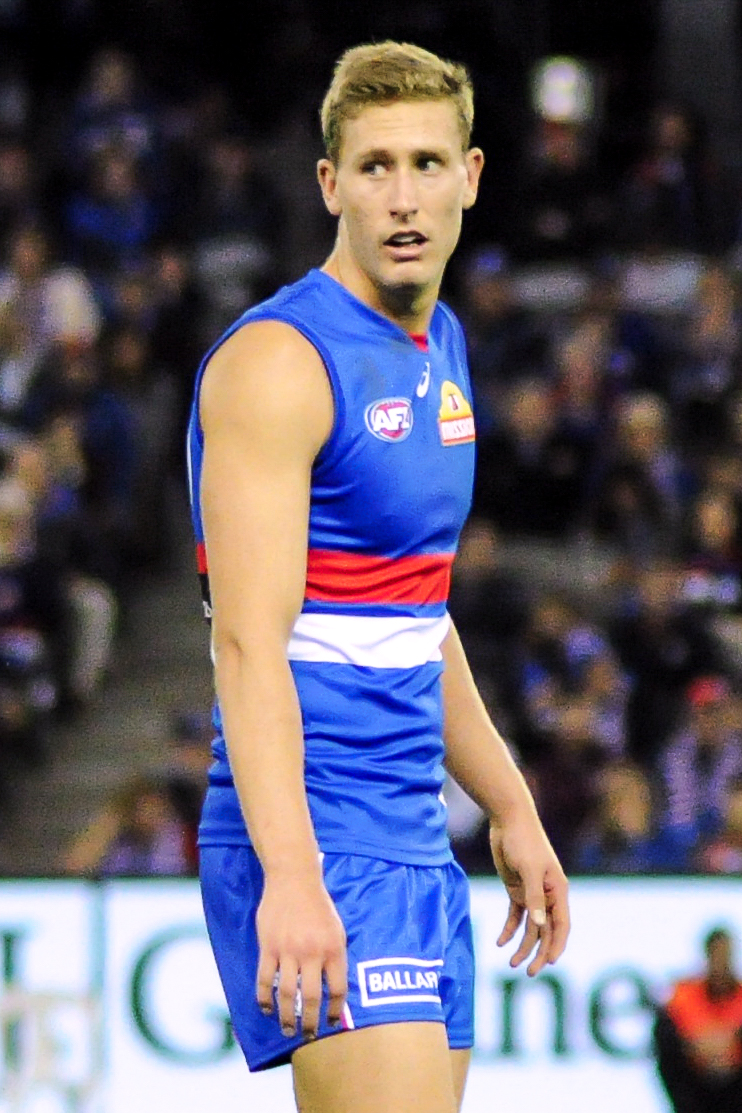
- Naughton playing for the Western Bulldogs in April 2018

Personal information
- Nicknames: Astronaught; Naughty
- Born: 30 November 1999 (age 26); Frankston, Victoria
- Original team: Peel Thunder (WAFL)
- Draft: No. 9, 2017 national draft
- Debut: Round 1, 2018, Western Bulldogs vs. Greater Western Sydney, at Manuka Oval
- Height: 195 cm (6 ft 5 in)
- Weight: 93 kg (205 lb)
- Position: Key forward

Club information
- Current club: Western Bulldogs
- Number: 33

Playing career^{1}
Years	Club	Games (Goals)
2018–	Western Bulldogs	189 (336)

Representative team honours
Years	Team	Games (Goals)
2026	Western Australia	1 (0)
- ^{1} Playing statistics correct to the end of finals week 1, 2026.

Career highlights
- 4x Western Bulldogs leading goalkicker: 2022, 2023, 2025, 2026; AFL Rising Star nominee: 2018; 22under22 team: 2019, 2020, 2021, 2022; Chris Grant Best First Year Player Award: 2018; State of Origin (WA): 2026

Aaron Naughton (born 30 November 1999) is a professional Australian rules footballer playing for the Western Bulldogs in the Australian Football League (AFL). Standing at 195cm, Naughton is a key position player who is renowned for his strong marking skills and can play both in defence and attack.

He is known by Bulldogs fans as the "AstroNaught" due to his surname and for his large leaps to grasp outstanding high-flying marks.

== Early years ==
Naughton was born in Frankston, Victoria to parents Gabby and Wayne Naughton, later moving with family to Langwarrin. He has an older brother, Travis, who played high-level junior football but ultimately went undrafted. At a young age, Naughton and his family moved to Rockingham, Western Australia. He was educated at Kolbe Catholic College, and played his junior football for the Rockingham Rams Football Club. Following his time with the Rams, he played under-16s state football and then under-18s state football for Western Australia, catching the eye of draft scouts. He played two under-18s matches in 2016, averaging 7.5 disposals and two marks, improving upon this in 2017, to average 14.8 disposals and 5.3 marks across four matches. He also played for Peel Thunder throughout the 2016 and 2017 seasons, in both the Colts and Senior divisions. He played 13 games for the Colts division in 2016, averaging 4 marks and 14 disposals a game. He then split his time between the Colts and Seniors in 2017, playing 7 matches in both divisions. He had his best game in the senior team in round 19 of the 2017 WAFL season, where he had 23 disposals and 11 marks. Naughton narrowly missed playing in the Thunder's premiership victory over Subiaco, with ex-Fremantle footballer Zac Dawson selected ahead of him.

== AFL career ==
Naughton was drafted by the Western Bulldogs with their first selection and the ninth overall pick at the 2017 national draft.

He made his debut in Round 1 of the 2018 season against Greater Western Sydney at UNSW Canberra Oval, an 82-point loss. Naughton subsequently played 18 games in his debut season, finishing fourth in the club best-and-fairest count and winning the Chris Grant Best First Year Player Award. He also earned a Rising Star nomination for his performance against Richmond in Round 23. Naughton was moved into the forward line at the beginning of the 2019 season. The move was an immediate success, with Naughton kicking 32 goals in his second year. He led the AFL for contested marks at the conclusion of the 2019 season, reaching a total of 53. His contested marking was best on display in round 7 against Richmond, claiming nine contested marks; one shy of the AFL record. Naughton kicked a career-high six goals in the 12th round of the 2020 season against Adelaide.

Naughton had a career-best start to the 2021 season, kicking multiple goals in each game up to Round 9. He was named as one of the Bulldogs' best players in their narrow win over West Coast, kicking 3 goals, including the one which put them back in front in the final quarter. He then had his best game for the season in Round 9, kicking 4 goals to help his team secure the win over Port Adelaide.

== Personal life ==
Naughton resides in Melbourne, with his girlfriend, fashion influencer Ella Morris; with whom he has been in a relationship with since 2023, and influencers and podcasters Steph and Holly Davey, the younger sisters of Collingwood AFLW footballer Bri Davey.

== Honours and achievements ==
=== Individual ===
- 4 x Western Bulldogs leading goalkicker: 2022, 2023, 2025, 2026
- AFL Rising Star nominee: 2018
- 22under22 team: 2019, 2020, 2021, 2022
- Chris Grant Best First Year Player Award: 2018
- State of Origin (WA): 2026

== Statistics ==
Updated to the end of round 22, 2026.

Legend
G	Goals	K	Kicks	D	Disposals	T	Tackles
B	Behinds	H	Handballs	M	Marks

Season	Team	No.	Games	Totals							Averages (per game)							Votes
Season	Team	No.	Games	G	B	K	H	D	M	T	G	B	K	H	D	M	T	Votes
2018	Western Bulldogs	33	18	2	1	130	78	208	77	38	0.1	0.1	7.2	4.3	11.6	4.3	2.1	0
2019	Western Bulldogs	33	23	32	27	170	80	250	132	42	1.4	1.2	7.4	3.5	10.9	5.7	1.8	7
2020 (Note: The 2020 season was played with 17 home-and-away matches per team (down from 22) and 16-minute quarters with time on (down from 20-minute quarters with time on) due to the impact of the COVID-19 pandemic.)	Western Bulldogs	33	12	15	6	46	38	84	42	9	1.3	0.5	3.8	3.2	7.0	3.5	0.8	3
2021	Western Bulldogs	33	25	47	40	186	94	280	153	39	1.9	1.6	7.4	3.8	11.2	6.1	1.6	0
2022	Western Bulldogs	33	22	51	34	179	77	256	103	47	2.3	1.5	8.1	3.5	11.6	4.7	2.1	6
2023	Western Bulldogs	33	23	44	33	180	87	267	100	59	1.9	1.4	7.8	3.8	11.6	4.3	2.6	2
2024	Western Bulldogs	33	20	35	14	148	81	229	101	21	1.8	0.7	7.4	4.1	11.5	5.1	1.1	4
2025	Western Bulldogs	33	23	60	27	189	82	271	124	45	2.6	1.2	8.2	3.6	11.8	5.4	2.0	6
2026	Western Bulldogs	33	20	44	27	138	77	215	90	29	2.2	1.4	6.9	3.9	10.8	4.5	1.5	0
Career			186	330	209	1366	694	2060	922	329	1.8	1.1	7.3	3.7	11.1	5.0	1.8	28
