= Daniel Kerr =

Australian rules footballer (born 1983)

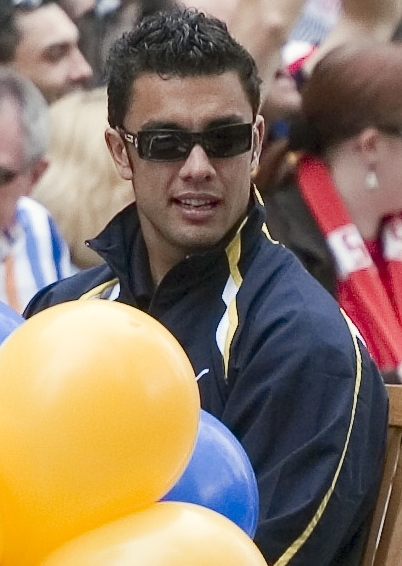
- Kerr with West Coast in 2005

Personal information
- Full name: Daniel Alan Kerr
- Born: 16 May 1983 (age 43); Perth, Western Australia
- Original team: East Fremantle (WAFL)
- Draft: 18th pick, 2000 AFL draft
- Height: 178 cm (5 ft 10 in)
- Weight: 80 kg (176 lb)
- Position: Midfielder

Playing career^{1}
Years	Club	Games (Goals)
2001–2013	West Coast	220 (122)

Representative team honours
Years	Team	Games (Goals)
2008	Dream Team	1 (0)

International team honours
2007	Australia	2 (0)
- ^{1} Playing statistics correct to the end of 2013.

Career highlights
- West Coast premiership side: 2006; All-Australian team: 2007; Geoff Christian Medal: 2007, 2012; Goal of the Year: 2003; West Coast Life Member: 2008; AFL Rising Star nominee: 2001

Daniel Alan Kerr (born 16 May 1983) is a former Australian rules footballer who played for the West Coast Eagles in the Australian Football League (AFL). He played 220 games for the club between 2001 and 2013, as a hard-running inside midfielder.

Kerr was born and raised in Perth, Western Australia. His father Roger also played professional football, while his sister Samantha plays professional soccer. Kerr was recruited to West Coast with the 18th pick in the 2000 National Draft. He finished runner-up in the 2001 AFL Rising Star, and in 2003, aged 20, won the Goal of the Year award. Kerr placed in the top three of the Brownlow Medal in three consecutive seasons from 2005 to 2007, notably finishing runner-up to teammate Ben Cousins in 2005 by a single vote. He played in a premiership in 2006 after a grand final loss the previous year, and was also named in the 2007 All-Australian team.

Kerr suffered from injuries later in his career, eventually retiring from AFL football at the end of the 2013 season. He has been convicted of a number of criminal offences both during and after his football career, culminating in his imprisonment for arson in 2021.

== Early life and family ==
Kerr was born in Perth, Western Australia, to Roxanne (née Regan) and Roger Kerr. His mother was born in Australia, while his father was born to an Anglo-Indian family in Calcutta. Roger played professional football in the 1980s, appearing for East Fremantle in the WAFL and briefly also for Port Adelaide in the SANFL. Kerr's younger sister Samantha also grew up playing football, but switched to soccer at the age of twelve. Sam grew into one of the world's top players, captaining Australia internationally for The Matildas and domestically in both the W-League and the American National Women's Soccer League (NWSL), winning multiple league MVP and Golden Boot titles in both. Kerr and his sister are also more distantly related to two other famous West Australian footballers, Con Regan and Shaun McManus.

Kerr attended Aquinas College, Perth, where he met future teammate Quinten Lynch and several other future AFL players. He was in the East Fremantle Football Club's zone as a teenager, although he did not play at senior WAFL level before being drafted. He later played two games for East Fremantle in 2011 and three more in 2013.

== Football career ==
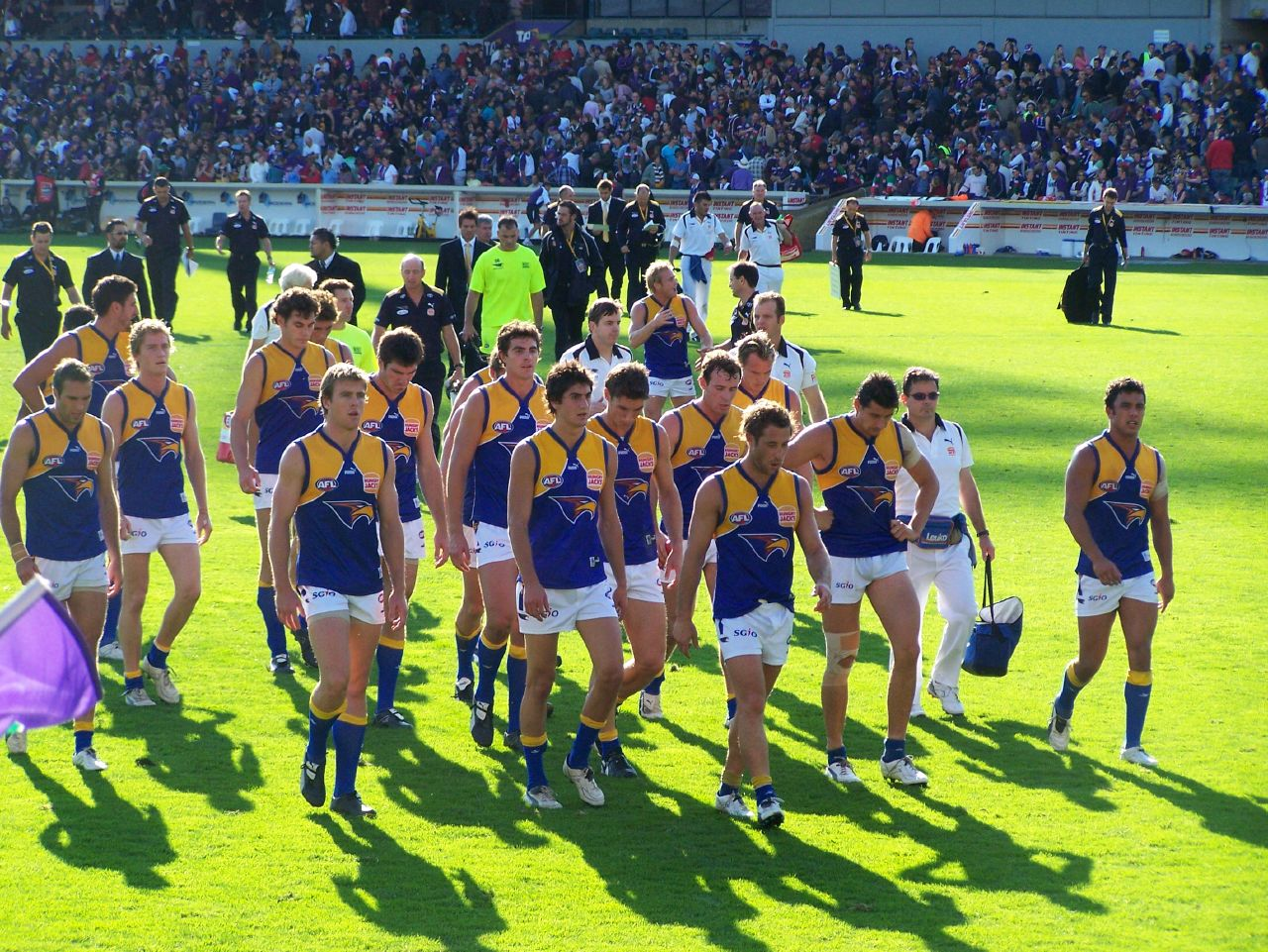
Kerr (far right) with other West Coast players in 2006

Kerr was selected with the number 18 pick in the 2000 AFL draft. He has retrospectively been cited by multiple sources as among the top five players to emerge from the draft. He went on to make his senior debut for West Coast against Geelong in round 1 of the 2001 AFL season and played 19 games in total in his debut season. He was the recipient of the AFL Players Association award for best first-year player. Kerr won Goal of the Year in 2003, aged 20, for a five-bounce running goal in the Western Derby against Fremantle. He received a handpass at left half-back before weaving his way through several opponents and converting from 45 metres.

Kerr was considered one of the leading members of the West Coast Eagles midfield that led the team to back-to-back grand finals in 2005 and 2006, together with Ben Cousins and Chris Judd. The shortest member of the trio at 178 centimetres (5 ft 10 in), he was known for his physical strength and tackling ability.

In 2005, Kerr led the Brownlow Medal count towards the later rounds and ultimately finished runner-up to Cousins. In 2006, he came third in the Brownlow Medal count with 22 votes; however, he was ineligible due to a striking charge against Hawthorn's Sam Mitchell in Round 14. He was also a part of the Eagles' 2006 premiership side and still managed to receive 20 disposals during the game, despite playing with detached ligaments in his foot. He received three votes in the Norm Smith Medal for the best player in the ground.

During the 2007 season, Kerr again polled in the top two of the Brownlow Medal, although he was again ineligible to win due to a suspension. He did win the 2007 Geoff Christian Medal as the best player in Western Australia and was also named in the 2007 All-Australian team.

Following the departure of Cousins and Judd at the end of 2007, and the twilight of other veterans like Michael Braun and Chad Fletcher, Kerr was widely acknowledged as the leader of West Coast's midfield. Signing a contract extension in 2008, he stayed with the club during a period which saw the club miss the finals for three consecutive years for the first time and receive its first wooden spoon. In 2010, Kerr suffered a season-ending hamstring injury in round four against Essendon. After his retirement he stated: "I was able to play football to a reasonable level which allowed me to play in the team, but ever since I did my hamstring I was never the same player I was before that"

Kerr was cited as a major influence in West Coast's resurgence in 2011, recording career-high averages for contested possessions, clearances and inside-50s despite limited game-time due to injuries. He was among the best on ground in the team's narrow three-point win in the semi-final against Carlton, the club's first finals win since the 2006 grand final. During the year he fractured several vertebrae in his spine after a heavy hit from Nathan Lovett-Murray.

Kerr signed a further two-year contract with West Coast mid-way through the 2012 AFL season, shortly before playing his 200th AFL game. However, he announced his retirement from AFL football in October 2013.

=== Statistics ===
Legend
G	Goals	K	Kicks	D	Disposals	T	Tackles
B	Behinds	H	Handballs	M	Marks

Season	Team	No.	Games	Totals							Averages (per game)						
Season	Team	No.	Games	G	B	K	H	D	M	T	G	B	K	H	D	M	T
2001	West Coast	34	19	7	6	147	149	296	38	67	0.4	0.3	7.7	7.8	15.6	2.0	3.5
2002	West Coast	4	23	20	10	208	203	411	43	75	0.9	0.4	9.0	8.8	17.9	1.9	3.3
2003	West Coast	4	21	17	8	203	202	405	54	74	0.8	0.4	9.7	9.6	19.3	2.6	3.5
2004	West Coast	4	21	13	8	243	173	416	74	68	0.6	0.4	11.6	8.2	19.8	3.5	3.2
2005	West Coast	4	22	8	12	264	196	460	81	59	0.4	0.5	12.0	8.9	20.9	3.7	2.7
2006	West Coast	4	21	11	16	233	249	482	61	67	0.5	0.8	11.1	11.9	23.0	2.9	3.2
2007	West Coast	4	17	8	11	223	238	461	46	61	0.5	0.6	13.1	14.0	27.1	2.7	3.6
2008	West Coast	4	11	6	2	131	130	261	24	26	0.5	0.2	11.9	11.8	23.7	2.2	2.4
2009	West Coast	4	11	7	3	76	138	214	7	30	0.6	0.3	6.9	12.5	19.5	0.6	2.7
2010	West Coast	4	4	1	1	24	54	78	3	12	0.3	0.3	6.0	13.5	19.5	0.8	3.0
2011	West Coast	4	16	7	8	174	220	394	35	38	0.4	0.5	10.9	13.8	24.6	2.2	2.4
2012	West Coast	4	24	13	8	291	261	552	56	53	0.5	0.3	12.1	10.9	23.0	2.3	2.2
2013	West Coast	4	10	4	0	95	112	207	17	27	0.4	0.0	9.5	11.2	20.7	1.7	2.7
Career			220	122	93	2312	2325	4637	539	657	0.6	0.4	10.5	10.6	21.1	2.5	3.0

== Personal life ==
In May 2009, Kerr became engaged to his girlfriend of nearly two years, Natasha Pozo. They were married at Aquinas College, Perth in January 2010. In 2011, they had their first child, a daughter. They had their second child, another daughter, in 2012. In January 2014, it was announced that Kerr and Pozo had separated. They are now divorced.

In 2017 Kerr and partner Michelle McAtackney had their first child together. This is the first child for McAtackney and third for Kerr.

== Off-field controversies and convictions ==
=== Assaults ===
In September 2002, Kerr was involved in a brawl with teammate Ben Cousins at a Perth nightclub during the club's end of season celebrations. Later the same night, after Cousins had previously punched Kerr in the face, Kerr then pushed Cousins down a flight of stairs, breaking his arm.

In January 2007, Kerr and his father were charged with assault following a party in Perth. Kerr is understood to have been at a farewell party for his sister's friend in Attadale before trouble erupted shortly after midnight. An 18-year-old man suffered a broken nose and broken tooth. Kerr was charged with two counts of assault occasioning bodily harm. He pleaded guilty to assault occasioning bodily harm and was fined $2000 over the attack. His father was also fined after being found guilty of assault.

In February 2007, Kerr was arrested and charged with disorderly conduct after an altercation with a taxi driver. He was later arrested again while at a training session, and further charged with assault occasioning bodily harm and willful damage. Police prosecutor Gary Flynn told the court Kerr saw the taxi and jumped screaming and shouting onto the boot. The taxi driver got out of his car and was attacked by Kerr, Sgt Flynn said. Kerr's lawyer John Prior said his client had gone out to dinner, "consumed too much alcohol" and "made a crucial bad judgement call". Kerr pleaded guilty to the charges and was fined.

In April 2010, Kerr was ordered by the Criminal Injuries Compensation Tribunal to pay $13,125 to teenager Troy Luies, after Luies filed a claim for the injuries he suffered at the Kerr's hands on 14 January 2007. Assessor William Millar awarded Luies compensation for the assault by Kerr, as payment for his hospital bills, lost pay and for trauma suffered.

=== Drugs ===
In 2004, Kerr was charged with forging a prescription. He was given the blank prescription by a person at a party and went to a 24-hour chemist to buy 50 valium tablets. The court fined him a total of $400 and made a spent conviction order. He was also fined $5,000 by the club and was required to complete community service throughout the football season.

In mid-2005, Kerr and teammate Michael Gardiner were observed behaving erratically in a nightclub by members of an opposition team following a match. They believed the two had taken illicit drugs while in the toilets.

In March 2007, information was released that implicated Kerr and former Eagle Aaron Edwards in drug dealing over the phone. His conversations with convicted drug dealer Shane Waters relating to a "big bag of horse chaff" were recorded by police phone taps in 2003.

In September 2007, Kerr was alleged to have abused staff at a Melbourne hotel on the day of the AFLPA awards. His club were informed of the incident, and when they came to check on Kerr at 2pm, he was still in bed. They observed he was hungover and blamed the incident on alcohol rather than drugs. The West Coast Eagles forced Kerr to start seeing a clinical psychologist at the beginning of 2008, in an attempt to combat his anger management issues and alcoholism.

=== Arson ===
In November 2014, Kerr was arrested and charged with endangering the lives of two people after he allegedly started a small fire at a house in Glendalough. He spent five nights at Hakea Prison before being released on bail when his parents paid the $5000 surety.

On 17 February 2021 Kerr was charged with criminal damage by fire after a fire damaged the rear of his parents' Kardinya house. He denied responsibility for the fire, but as he was already on bail for domestic violence charges, his bail was revoked. In May 2023, Kerr was sentenced to two years’ jail for the fire, backdated to his arrest in 2021.

=== Domestic violence ===
Kerr was charged with aggravated stalking and breaching a violence restraining order on 19 August 2020. On 16 September 2020 he was charged with historical domestic violence charges.

In June 2024, Kerr pleaded guilty to one count of "engaging in persistent family violence", in exchange for the withdrawal of a series of other domestic violence charges. The charges related to his former partner, with prosecutors alleging that he had "wielded physical, emotional and verbal abuse over the woman", including choking and punching her, as well as "destroyed her property and gained control of her finances and social media accounts". The presiding judge handed down a suspended jail sentence of four years and six months, with strict supervision requirements, on the basis that he continue to receive treatment for his mental health issues. He was also declared to be a "serial family violence offender" but was not subjected to electronic monitoring.
