= E. J. Whitten Medal =

Award for best Victorian player in State of Origin football match

The E. J. Whitten Medal is awarded to the best Victorian player in an Australian rules football State of Origin football match. The award is named after Ted Whitten, also known as "Mr. Football", who played for and coached Footscray and was an advocate of interstate football. He played 29 games for Victoria, and he coached the state side nearing his death of cancer in 1995.

Year	Player	Opponent
1985	Paul Roos	WA
1986	Dale Weightman	WA
1986	Kevin Walsh	SA
1987	Greg Williams	WA
1987	Chris Langford	SA
1988	Paul Roos	Carnival
1988	Gerard Healy	WA
1989	Gavin Brown	SA
1989	Jason Dunstall	WA
1990	Simon Madden	WA
1990	Dale Weightman	NSW
1991	Barry Mitchell	WA
1991	Alan Ezard	SA
1992	Stewart Loewe	WA
1992	Robert Harvey	SA
1993	Chris Langford	NSW/ACT
1993	Robert Harvey	SA
1994	David Calthorpe	SA
1995	Tony Lockett	SA
1996	Robert Harvey	Allies
1997	Gavin Brown	SA
1998	Rohan Smith	Allies
1999	Brent Harvey	SA
2026	Lachie Ash	WA

- Note: in 2008, for the AFL Hall of Fame Tribute Match, Brendan Fevola was awarded the Allen Aylett Medal as the best player for Victoria.
