= 2007 All-Australian team =

The 2007 All-Australian team represents the best performing Australian Football League (AFL) players during the 2007 season. The selection panel provided the 40 leading players of the year in their playing positions at the conclusion of the home and away season before announcing the final 22 at a later date during the All-Australian Presentation Dinner. Of the 40 leading players for that year, the leading 16 midfielders/ruckmen were all respectively nominated, as were the leading twelve defenders and forwards. Six of each were then to be chosen in the final team, with the four interchange positions occupied by players remaining from the group of 40. The team is honorary and does not play any games.

Nine Geelong players made it into the 2007 squad and all were picked for the team.

== Selection panel ==
The selection panel for the 2007 All-Australian team consisted of non-voting chairman Wayne Jackson, Rod Austin, Kevin Bartlett, Andrew Demetriou, Gerard Healy, Neil Kerley, Chris Mainwaring and Robert Walls.

== Team ==
=== Initial squad ===
2007 All-Australian squad
Defenders
Jed Adcock (Brisbane)	Craig Bolton (Sydney)	Campbell Brown (Hawthorn)	Matthew Egan (Geelong)
Samuel Fisher (St Kilda)	Dustin Fletcher (Essendon)	Darren Glass (West Coast)	Roger Hayden (Fremantle)
Andrew McLeod (Adelaide)	Nick Malceski (Sydney)	Darren Milburn (Geelong)	Matthew Scarlett (Geelong)
Midfielders/Ruckmen
Gary Ablett Jr. (Geelong)	Jimmy Bartel (Geelong)	Joel Corey (Geelong)	Chad Cornes (Port Adelaide)
Kane Cornes (Port Adelaide)	Dean Cox (West Coast)	Nick Dal Santo (St Kilda)	Luke Hodge (Hawthorn)
Nathan Foley (Richmond)	Daniel Kerr (West Coast)	Brett Kirk (Sydney)	Brendon Lade (Port Adelaide)
Nigel Lappin (Brisbane)	Cameron Ling (Geelong)	Hamish McIntosh (Kangaroos)	Sam Mitchell (Hawthorn)
Forwards
Jonathan Brown (Brisbane)	Brett Ebert (Port Adelaide)	Lance Franklin (Hawthorn)	Brent Harvey (Kangaroos)
Brad Johnson (Bulldogs)	Steve Johnson (Geelong)	Corey Jones (Kangaroos)	Scott Lucas (Essendon)
Cameron Mooney (Geelong)	Matthew Pavlich (Fremantle)	Matthew Richardson (Richmond)	Nick Riewoldt (St Kilda)

=== Final team ===
2007 All-Australian team
B:	Matthew Scarlett (Geelong)	Darren Glass (West Coast)	Darren Milburn (Geelong)
HB:	Andrew McLeod (Adelaide) (captain)	Matthew Egan (Geelong)	Campbell Brown (Hawthorn)
C:	Kane Cornes (Port Adelaide)	Jimmy Bartel (Geelong)	Chad Cornes (Port Adelaide)
HF:	Steve Johnson (Geelong)	Jonathan Brown (Brisbane) (vice-captain)	Brent Harvey (Kangaroos)
F:	Brad Johnson (Bulldogs)	Matthew Pavlich (Fremantle)	Cameron Mooney (Geelong)
Foll:	Dean Cox (West Coast)	Daniel Kerr (West Coast)	Gary Ablett Jr. (Geelong)
Int:	Joel Corey (Geelong)	Dustin Fletcher (Essendon)	Brendon Lade (Port Adelaide)
Int:	Cameron Ling (Geelong)		
Coach:	Mark Thompson (Geelong)		

Note: the position of coach in the All-Australian team is traditionally awarded to the coach of the premiership team.
