= State of Origin =

Sporting event between players representing their state or territory

A State of Origin (Origin) competition is a type of sporting event between players representing the state or territory from which they originate, rather than the one in which they reside. State of Origin began in Australian rules football on 8 October 1977 between Western Australia (WA) and Victoria, at Subiaco Oval in Perth, the initial brainchild of Leon Larkin. The selection criteria for Australian football have varied, but they are generally applied to players who have played most of their juniors games in a particular state or territory, hence the name "State of Origin". In rugby league the criteria are different, where players are selected for where they either first played senior rugby league or where they played in the majority of senior competitions. The annual Rugby League State of Origin series is one of Australia's most popular sporting events. The name is also used in Australia for small sporting events which generally involve domestic representative teams.

It was devised to address the drift of most talented Australian rules players to the Victorian Football League (VFL) and the effect that this had on interstate matches. A similar situation existed in regard to the New South Wales Rugby League which attracted the best players from the Queensland Rugby League because of its far stronger and financially attractive competition. The latter was due to the increased funds of the New South Wales clubs, due to poker machines, which Queensland laws prohibited.

== History ==
While the "State of Origin" name was unique to Australia, the underlying selection philosophy was not; international rugby union (Home Nations Championship) and Association football (soccer) had utilised a birth-based qualification system akin to the Origin concept since the 1880s.The first recorded call in Australia for 'state of origin' selection type rules for interstate football was made in 1900, when a journalist known as "The Cynic" writing for a rugby football periodical called The Referee, suggested that Sydney's Wallaroo FC player Stephen Spragg, who had moved to Queensland, should be able to play for his state of birth, New South Wales. The change did not eventuate, with residential selection rules prevailing both before and after the split into rugby league and rugby union until the concept was later resurrected for league for a one-off State of Origin match in 1980. However, while it was 1890s rugby union in Australia that gave birth to the State of Origin blue (NSW) and maroon (Queensland) colours, the concept has never been used in that code.

=== Rugby league (Australia) ===
Traditionally, the basis for selecting players in representative international sides (i.e. their country of origin) did not extend to interstate sides in Australian rugby league. Instead players represented the state in which they played their club football as per the 'residency rule', in which they played for the club which represented the district they lived in. This gave a significant advantage to New South Wales, as the movement of players south was far greater than the movement north, especially beginning in the 1960s when the NSW state government allowed football clubs to install poker machine parlours at their social clubhouses. Flush with cash from their gambling interests, top Sydney clubs could easily pay lavish sums for Queensland talent that Brisbane clubs could not afford to match.

Former Queensland captain and Australian vice-captain Jack Reardon, who had later become a journalist, was the first to suggest that Sydney-based Queenslanders should be available for selection to represent their state. This would not eventuate until decades later, however, when New South Wales and Queensland played their first "state of origin" match on 8 July 1980. The Australian rules experience was echoed, with Queenslanders showing enormous interest in the game at Lang Park, Brisbane, although NSW-based players and journalists described it as "the non-event of the century". Queensland defeated New South Wales in that match, and State of Origin has grown into Australia's greatest sporting rivalry.

The popularity of State of Origin matches since then has not waned, and they remain one of Australia's (and indeed the region's) biggest sporting events. A record crowd of 91,513 attended a game at the Melbourne Cricket Ground in 2015. The record for the annual three-game series was set in 2015, when a total of 224,135 people attended. The 2005 series saw an attendance record for a series with two matches in Queensland, with 187,374. The record television audience was set during game 1 of the 2009 series and stands at 3.48 million. Queensland has won 18 series from 1982–2013, and NSW has won 13, with 2 drawn. Queensland has won the most series in a row. (8 Series from 2006–2013).

Australian international teams are often selected based on performance in the State of Origin series.

New South Wales play in sky blue jerseys and are known as "the Blues", a term dating from 1974 when a journalist used the name in an article. The Blues won that series, leading coach Jack Gibson to comment: "I thought they went pretty well for a bunch of cockroaches". The Queensland team plays in a maroon jersey, and are called "the Maroons". Both teams also have unbecoming nicknames – New South Wales: "the Cockroaches"; Queensland: "the Cane Toads".

=== Australian football ===
The first 'state of origin' game was an Australian Football game between Western Australia (WA) and Victoria, at Subiaco Oval in Perth on 8 October 1977. Leon Larkin, marketing manager of the Subiaco Football Club in the West Australian Football League (WAFL), negotiated with the VFL for two years, before arrangements for the game were finalised. In the words of football historian John Devaney:

A Western Australian team comprised entirely of home-based players had, on 25 June, taken on a Victorian team containing many of the same players who would return to Perth ... for the state of origin clash. The respective scores of the two matches offered a persuasive argument, if such were needed, of the extent to which the VFL had denuded the WAFL of its elite talent:

- On 25 June 1977 Victoria 23.16 (154) defeated Western Australia 13.13 (91) – a margin of 63 points
- On 8 October 1977 Western Australia 23.13 (151) defeated Victoria 8.9 (57) – a margin of 94 points, representing an overall turn around of 157 points

Western Australia's previous biggest winning margin against a Victorian state team had been a mere 38 points in 1948. Almost overnight, an inferiority complex was dismantled: Victoria, it seemed, was not intrinsically superior, only wealthier.

— Devaney,

Games involving each of the other states soon followed. In 1989, a crowd of 91,960 people – a record for interstate games in Australian rules – attended a game between Victoria and South Australia at the MCG.

However, attendance and interest declined during the 1990s, due to a variety of factors, such as the VFL's ongoing conversion into a national club competition, the Australian Football League (AFL). The last official State of Origin game involving AFL players was held in 1999. However, a veterans' game was held annually from 1996 until 2019.

A one-off AFL Hall of Fame Tribute Match between Victorian and Dream Team, a team representing the rest of Australia, was staged on 10 May 2008 to celebrate 150 years of Australian Football; another one-off game, a State of Origin for Bushfire Relief Match, between Victoria and All-Stars, a team representing the rest of Australia, was staged to raise money for the victims of the 2019–20 Australian bushfire season.

A 2026 AFL Origin match between Western Australia and Victoria State of Origin teams has been scheduled for February 2026 at Optus Stadium, the first match-up between the two sides since 1992. The match is branded "AFL Origin" and was organised in partnership with Tourism Western Australia.

=== Rugby league (England) ===
The success of the State of Origin series in Australian rugby league resulted in the revival of England's inter-county games in 2001, under the name Origin Series. However, the revival was scrapped in 2003 amid increasing fixture congestion and general apathy from league supporters.

The International Origin Match, held from 2011 to 2013, was more of an all-star game, as it pitted the England national team against Australian and New Zealand stars in the largely English-based Super League.
