= Roger Kerr (footballer) =

Australian rules footballer (born 1960)

Personal information
- Full name: Roger Alan Kerr
- Born: 18 December 1960 (age 65); Calcutta, West Bengal, India
- Original team: East Fremantle JFC
- Position: Midfielder

Playing career
Years	Club	Games (Goals)
1981–87, 1989	East Fremantle	85 (114)
1988	Port Adelaide	24 (23)
1990–91	Perth	16 (19)

Coaching career
Years	Club	Games (W–L–D)
2008–09	Claremont	25 (6–19–0)

Career highlights
- East Fremantle premiership side 1985; Port Adelaide premiership side 1988

Roger Alan Kerr (born 18 December 1960) is a former Australian rules football player and coach. He played senior football for East Fremantle and Perth in the West Australian Football League (WAFL), including the 1985 premiership with East Fremantle, and 24 games with Port Adelaide in the South Australian National Football League (SANFL), including the 1988 premiership. He later coached WAFL side Claremont.

== Early life ==
Roger Alan Kerr was born in Calcutta in 1960 to Coral Beryl and Denzil Mowbray Kerr. His Anglo-Indian parents were also born in Calcutta. His father was a metallurgist and represented Bengal as a featherweight boxer, while his mother played women's basketball. The family emigrated to Australia in 1969, settling in Fremantle, Western Australia.

== Playing career ==
Kerr made his senior debut for East Fremantle during the 1981 WAFL season. He was a "quick, lively rover with good skills and keen goal sense", although he suffered from injuries and was occasionally inconsistent. Kerr had a breakout season in 1984, kicking 31 goals from 23 games and playing in the grand final loss to Swan Districts. He played only five games the following year, but this included the grand final victory against Subiaco, a game he started on the interchange bench.

In 1987, Kerr kicked 36 goals from 23 games and placed fourth in the Sandover Medal, only two votes behind the winner Mark Watson. He recorded the fifth-highest disposal count during the season. In 1988, Kerr moved to the SANFL to play for Port Adelaide, kicking 23 goals from 24 games and playing in the grand final victory over Glenelg, his second premiership. He again began the game on the interchange bench.

Kerr returned to the WAFL in 1989, playing four further games with East Fremantle to bring his total to 85 senior WAFL games with the club. He also played one game against Richmond in the 1985 AFC Night Series. He finished his career with Perth, kicking 19 goals from 16 games across 1990 and 1991.

== Coaching career ==
Kerr coached the South Fremantle colts (under-19) team for three years from 2002 to 2004, which included two premierships, before being appointed senior coach of Claremont for the 2008 WAFL season. He was sacked after round six of the 2009 season after Claremont lost their first five games.

== Personal life ==
His daughter, Sam Kerr, is the Matildas (the Australian women's football team) captain, was named MVP of the National Women's Soccer League in the US in 2017 and was the Young Australian of the Year in 2018. She currently plays for Chelsea Football Club. His son, Daniel Kerr, played for the West Coast Eagles in the Australian Football League (AFL).

In January 2007, Kerr and his son Daniel were charged with assault following a party in Perth. Reports suggested that Kerr's daughter complained about being touched inappropriately by another partygoer and a fight erupted soon after on the street. He was found guilty of assault and fined, but was acquitted of two more serious charges of assault occasioning bodily harm. Daniel pleaded guilty to assault occasioning bodily harm and was fined $2000 over the attack.
