= Australian Football Hall of Fame Tribute Match =

2008 Australian Football Hall of Fame Tribute Match

Victoria	Dream Team
21.11 (137)	18.12 (120)
	1	2	3	4
VIC	3.6 (24)	9.8 (62)	14.9 (93)	21.11 (137)
DT	5.4 (34)	8.6 (54)	15.8 (98)	18.12 (120)
- Date: 10 May 2008
- Stadium: Melbourne Cricket Ground
- Attendance: 69,294
- Umpires: Vozzo, Kennedy, Rosebury, McInerney
- Coin toss won by: Victoria
- Kicked toward: Punt Road End

Broadcast in Australia
- Network: Network Ten
- Commentators: Stephen Quartermain and Anthony Hudson

The Australian Football Hall of Fame Tribute Match was a one-off all-star game between two representative sides organised by the Australian Football League to celebrate the 150th anniversary of Australian rules football. The match was intended to celebrate the contribution of State of Origin and interstate matches to the history of the code.

The match was played on 10 May 2008 at the Melbourne Cricket Ground in Melbourne, Australia, between Victoria (the "Big V") and the "Dream Team", with a crowd of 69,294 in attendance.
Victoria won the match by 17 points: 21.11 (137) to 18.12 (120).

== Background ==
In 2007, the AFL announced that it would support a return of the State of Origin concept as a once-off carnival as part of the 150th anniversary of Australian rules football scheduled for 2008. The format of the carnival was not announced at this early stage.

The media featured several opinions on how the series could work without unduly interrupting the AFL season. There were suggestions that each state be individually represented, with a two division format to ensure that there would be no one-sided matches between the stronger states and the weaker states, and there were also suggestions for Victoria to be divided into separate Metro and Country, both of which are features of the annual AFL Under-18 Championships.

Many of the options that the AFL considered featured composite teams of weaker states, similar to the Allies team which represented Tasmania, Queensland, New South Wales and the Northern Territory collectively during State of Origin series in the 1990s.

By December, the vision for a full carnival had been reduced to a single all-star match, to be played between Victoria and the Dream Team, a composite team of all other states, territories and countries, on a State of Origin selection basis. The match would be held as a stand-alone match on the weekend between Rounds 7 and 8, on Saturday 10 May.

South Australia's Graham Cornes was critical of the format, saying that it deprived non-Victorian players of the honour of wearing a state guernsey. He felt that each state should have been given the opportunity to field their own team.

Amid concerns over player participation, the AFL considered introducing penalties for selected players who refused to participate. Instead, players were paid A$5,000 each to compete in the match, and the players agreed to donate the money to the AFL Players Association to be to distributed to three charities, a special past players fund, the Ladder program to combat homelessness and RecLink, which funds football leagues in remote communities in the Northern Territory.

In early 2008 the AFL announced the full details of the match and branded it as the "Australian Football Hall of Fame Tribute Match", deliberately distancing it from the former State of Origin series. It promoted the event by announcing two captains would be Jonathon Brown (Victoria) and Andrew McLeod (Dream Team).

Victoria wore its traditional navy blue guernsey with a white V. The Dream Team wore a predominantly white guernsey, with beige cuffs and collars, and blue numbers and side panels; the names of 1246 community and grass-roots football clubs competing within the Australian states and territories eligible for the Dream Team were also included in small beige text across the front.

== Squads ==
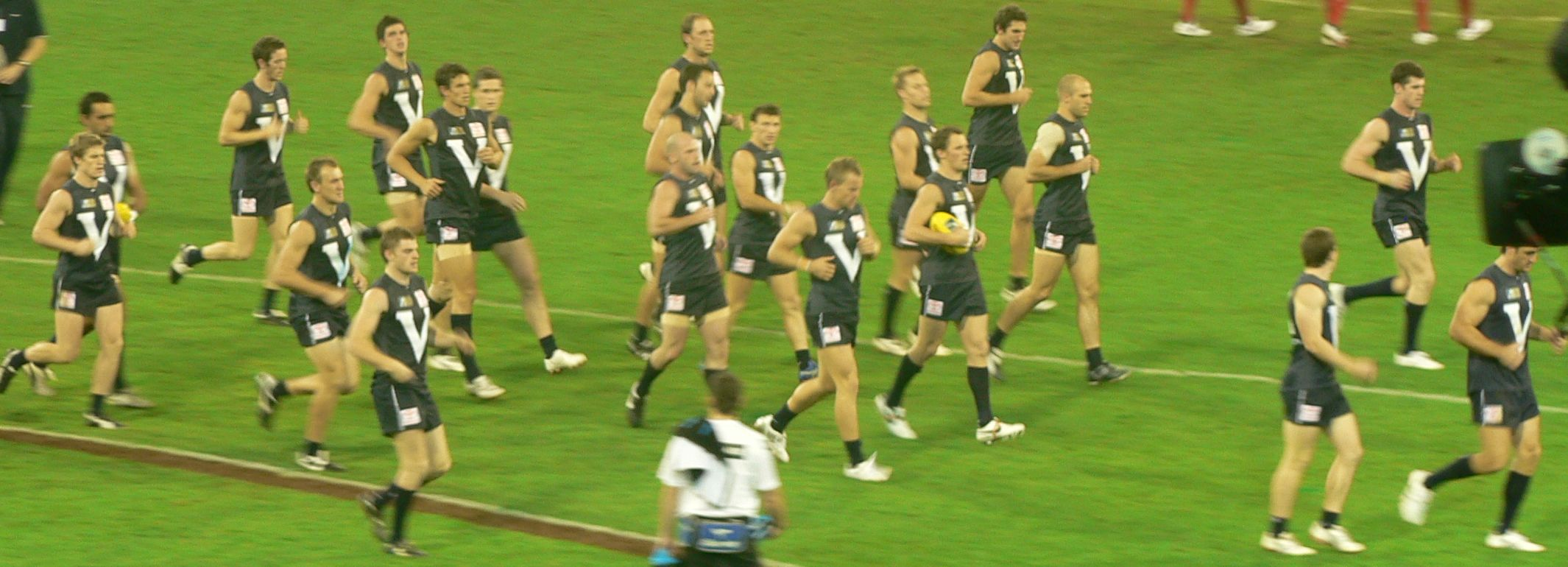
The Big V running out for the Hall of Fame Tribute Match in 2008. (From left to right: Luke Power, Adam Goodes, Robert Murphy, Darren Milburn, Scott Pendlebury, Heath Shaw, Troy Simmonds, Trent Croad, Paul Chapman, Josh Fraser, Jimmy Bartel, Brent Harvey, Ryan O'Keefe, Sam Mitchell, James Kelly, Jarrad Waite, Chris Judd, Jonathan Brown, Daniel Bradshaw.)

In April 2008 the AFL announced 40-man squads for both teams, which would later be trimmed to 25 per side. All AFL teams except Essendon and Melbourne had at least one player selected in one of the sides. The match was played with an extended interchange bench of seven players instead of four.

Several high-profile players pulled out of the match in the final weeks before the game. Gary Ablett Jr, Nick Dal Santo and Brad Johnson pulled out for Victoria, while Luke McPharlin and Irishman Tadhg Kennelly dropped out for the Dream Team.

=== Final teams ===
2008 Victorian Tribute Match side
B:	Campbell Brown (Hawthorn Hawks)	Matthew Scarlett (Geelong Cats)	Darren Milburn (Geelong Cats)
HB:	Heath Shaw (Collingwood Magpies)	Trent Croad (Hawthorn Hawks)	Jarrad Waite (Carlton Blues)
C:	Brent Harvey (North Melbourne Kangaroos)	Sam Mitchell (Hawthorn Hawks)	Adam Goodes (Sydney Swans)
HF:	Ryan O'Keefe (Sydney Swans)	Jonathan Brown (Brisbane Lions)	Robert Murphy (Western Bulldogs)
F:	Steve Johnson (Geelong Cats)	Brendan Fevola (Carlton Blues)	Daniel Bradshaw (Brisbane Lions)
Foll:	Troy Simmonds (Richmond Tigers)	Jimmy Bartel (Geelong Cats)	Chris Judd (Carlton Blues)
Int:	Josh Fraser (Collingwood Magpies)	Luke Power (Brisbane Lions)	Paul Chapman (Geelong Cats)
Int:	James Kelly (Geelong Cats)	Nathan Foley (Richmond Tigers)	Scott Pendlebury (Collingwood Magpies); Joel Selwood (Geelong Cats)
Coach:	Mark Thompson (Geelong Cats)		

2008 Dream Team Tribute Match side
B:	Graham Johncock (Adelaide Crows)	Ben Rutten (Adelaide Crows)	Craig Bolton (Sydney Swans)
HB:	Andrew McLeod (Adelaide) Crows	Matthew Pavlich (Fremantle Dockers)	Adam Cooney (Western Bulldogs)
C:	Matthew Richardson (Richmond Tigers)	Daniel Kerr (West Coast Eagles)	Shaun Burgoyne (Port Adelaide)
HF:	Simon Goodwin (Adelaide Crows)	Cameron Mooney (Geelong Cats)	Daniel Motlop (Port Adelaide)
F:	Brett Burton (Adelaide Crows)	Lance Franklin (Hawthorn Hawks)	Leon Davis (Collingwood Magpies)
Foll:	Dean Cox (West Coast Eagles)	Peter Burgoyne (Port Adelaide Power)	Kane Cornes (Port Adelaide Power)
Int:	Nathan Bock (Adelaide Crows)	Jamie Charman (Brisbane Lions)	Joel Corey (Geelong Cats)
Int:	Mathew Stokes (Geelong Cats)	Brett Kirk (Sydney Swans)	Corey Enright (Geelong Cats); Ryan Griffen (Western Bulldogs)
Coach:	Mark Williams (Port Adelaide Power)		

=== List ===
Victoria	137–120	Dream Team
(21.11)		(18.12)

Position	Player	Pos'ns	Goals
Forward	Steve Johnson	14	3.0
Forward	Brendan Fevola	10	6.2
Forward	Daniel Bradshaw	8	1.2
Half-Forward	Ryan O'Keefe	8	1.0
Half-Forward	Jonathan Brown	11	3.2
Half-Forward	Robert Murphy	14	1.1
Centre	Brent Harvey	23	3.0
Centre	Sam Mitchell	21	0.0
Centre	Adam Goodes	21	0.0
Half-Back	Heath Shaw	21	0.0
Half-Back	Trent Croad	8	0.0
Half-Back	Jarrad Waite	11	0.1
Back	Campbell Brown	12	1.0
Back	Matthew Scarlett	15	0.0
Back	Darren Milburn	16	0.0
Follower	Troy Simmonds	10	0.0
Follower	Jimmy Bartel	19	0.0
Follower	Chris Judd	20	0.0
Interchange:
Interchange	Josh Fraser	12	0.0
Interchange	Luke Power	20	0.0
Interchange	Paul Chapman	15	1.2
Interchange	James Kelly	15	0.0
Interchange	Nathan Foley	21	1.0
Interchange	Scott Pendlebury	19	0.0
Interchange	Joel Selwood	14	0.0
Coach:
Mark Thompson (Geelong)

Position	Player	Pos'ns	Goals
Forward	Brett Burton	14	2.1
Forward	Lance Franklin	14	4.5
Forward	Leon Davis	16	3.1
Half-Forward	Simon Goodwin	14	2.0
Half-Forward	Cameron Mooney	3	1.0
Half-Forward	Daniel Motlop	9	2.0
Centre	Matthew Richardson	13	1.1
Centre	Daniel Kerr	6	0.0
Centre	Shaun Burgoyne	21	1.0
Half-Back	Andrew McLeod	29	0.0
Half-Back	Matthew Pavlich	11	0.2
Half-Back	Adam Cooney	11	0.0
Back	Graham Johncock	25	0.0
Back	Ben Rutten	10	0.0
Back	Craig Bolton	6	0.0
Follower	Dean Cox	13	0.0
Follower	Peter Burgoyne	36	0.0
Follower	Kane Cornes	26	0.0
Interchange:
Interchange	Nathan Bock	11	0.0
Interchange	Jamie Charman	8	0.0
Interchange	Joel Corey	23	0.0
Interchange	Mathew Stokes	21	1.1
Interchange	Brett Kirk	12	1.0
Interchange	Corey Enright	12	0.0
Interchange	Ryan Griffen	12	0.0
Coach:
Mark Williams (Port Adelaide)

== Allen Aylett Medal ==
The Allen Aylett Medal for best on ground was awarded to Brendan Fevola, who kicked six goals for Victoria.

== Scorecard ==
Australian Football Hall of Fame Tribute Match
Saturday, 10 May 2008 7:40 pm	Victoria	def.	Dream Team	MCG (crowd: 69,294)
3.6 (24); 9.8 (62); 14.9 (93); 21.11 (137)	Q1; Q2; Q3; Final	5.4 (34); 8.6 (54); 15.8 (98); 18.12 (120)	Umpires: Vozzo, Kennedy, Rosebury, McInerney; Allen Aylett Medal: Brendan Fevola (Victoria)
Fevola 6 J Brown, Johnson, Harvey 3 O'Keefe, Murphy, C Brown, Chapman, Bradshaw, Foley 1	Goals	Franklin 4 Davis 3 Motlop, Burton, Goodwin 2 Richardson, Kirk, S Burgoyne, Mooney, Stokes 1
Fevola, Foley, Pendlebury, Goodes, Harvey	Best	P Burgoyne, McLeod, S Burgoyne, Johncock
Fraser (knee)	Injuries	Kerr (lower leg)

== See also ==
- 2008 AFL season
- State of Origin for Bushfire Relief Match – contested in 2020 to raise funds for the recovery efforts following the 2019–20 Australian bushfire season
- 2026 AFL Origin
