= Darren Milburn =

Australian rules footballer

Personal information
- Full name: Darren Milburn
- Nickname: Dasher
- Born: 15 April 1977 (age 49); Victoria, Australia
- Original team: Kilmore / Calder Cannons
- Draft: 48th overall, 1995
- Height: 190 cm (6 ft 3 in)
- Weight: 92 kg (203 lb)
- Position: Defender

Playing career^{1}
Years	Club	Games (Goals)
1996–2011	Geelong	292 (94)

Representative team honours^{2}
Years	Team	Games (Goals)
2008	Victoria	1 (0)

International team honours^{2}
2005	Australia	2 (0)
- ^{1} Playing statistics correct to the end of 2011.^{2} Representative statistics correct as of 2008.

Career highlights
- 2× AFL premiership player: 2007, 2009; All-Australian team: 2007; AFL Rising Star nominee: 1998

Darren Milburn (born 15 April 1977) is a former Australian rules footballer who played for the Geelong Football Club in the Australian Football League (AFL). A defender, 1.89 metres (6 ft 2 in) tall and weighing 92 kilograms (203 lb), Milburn was renowned for his competitiveness, decision-making and for both his physical and mental strength.

Milburn was selected in the 2007 All-Australian Team, and was part of Geelong's AFL premiership-winning team in the same year, a feat which has seen him become the first premiership player to play 250 matches for Geelong. He had also represented the Victorian state team in the AFL Hall of Fame Tribute Match, as well as being selected to represent Australia in International rules football.

Milburn was an assistant coach with the Adelaide Football Club from 2012 to 2015.

== Early life ==
Darren Milburn grew up in the country town of Kilmore, Victoria, where he attended school and played for the Kilmore Football Club. Milburn met his future wife, Tania, in his teenage years whilst still at school, and also was school friends with another future AFL footballer, Barry Hall, whom he met at a high school he attended in Broadford, Victoria.

== Career ==
Early in Milburn's career, he was involved in a controversial clash with Carlton's Stephen Silvagni in which he knocked him out with a high bump and was subsequently given a three week suspension. Milburn also sarcastically clapped to the vocal Carlton crowd as he came off the field after the incident, fanning further anger. He has previously stated that he does not regret the incident.

In 2007, he received his first All-Australian guernsey in the back pocket. Milburn played a pivotal role in Geelong's defence throughout the groundbreaking year, which ended with a premiership medallion for the veteran.

In 2008, Milburn once again was a regular fixture in the young Geelong side. In Geelong's round 16 game against the Western Bulldogs at Skilled Stadium, he racked up 19 disposals in the first quarter, breaking the record for the highest number of disposals in any quarter of football.

In an opening-round clash in 2011 against St Kilda, Milburn kicked a goal in the dying seconds to put Geelong in front and win by one point; he was nearly 34 at the time, the oldest player in that game, and had come on after a substitution. At the end of 2011, Milburn retired after playing 292 games and two premierships in 2007 and 2009 since his debut in 1997; Milburn was named as an emergency for the 2011 premiership. Milburn then went into coaching straight away and joined the Adelaide Crows for the 2012 AFL season, joining then-new senior coach, Brenton Sanderson (a former teammate and assistant coach at Geelong). Darren Milburn quit the Adelaide Football Club at the end of 2015 to return home to Victoria.

== Statistics ==
Legend
G	Goals	K	Kicks	D	Disposals	T	Tackles
B	Behinds	H	Handballs	M	Marks

Season	Team	No.	Games	Totals							Averages (per game)						
Season	Team	No.	Games	G	B	K	H	D	M	T	G	B	K	H	D	M	T
1997	Geelong	39	10	5	3	79	51	130	44	20	0.5	0.3	7.9	5.1	13.0	4.4	2.0
1998	Geelong	39	15	5	5	118	78	196	55	35	0.3	0.3	7.9	5.2	13.1	3.7	2.3
1999	Geelong	39	21	15	8	240	150	390	91	50	0.7	0.4	11.4	7.1	18.6	4.3	2.4
2000	Geelong	39	17	13	6	179	144	323	82	44	0.8	0.4	10.5	8.5	19.0	4.8	2.6
2001	Geelong	39	22	5	4	227	171	398	131	24	0.2	0.2	10.3	7.8	18.1	6.0	2.4
2002	Geelong	39	15	1	0	106	108	214	63	31	0.1	0.0	7.1	7.2	14.3	4.2	2.1
2003	Geelong	39	20	5	4	144	153	297	73	40	0.3	0.2	7.2	7.7	14.9	3.7	2.0
2004	Geelong	39	23	3	5	233	196	429	134	66	0.1	0.2	10.1	8.5	18.7	5.8	2.9
2005	Geelong	39	23	15	8	284	171	455	146	76	0.7	0.3	12.3	7.4	19.8	6.3	3.3
2006	Geelong	39	22	8	4	242	209	451	167	49	0.4	0.2	11.0	9.5	20.5	7.6	2.2
2007	Geelong	39	25	5	8	274	288	562	179	57	0.2	0.3	11.0	11.5	22.5	7.2	2.3
2008	Geelong	39	22	7	1	242	200	442	155	47	0.3	0.0	11.0	9.1	20.1	7.0	2.1
2009	Geelong	39	21	3	2	273	197	470	132	33	0.1	0.1	13.0	9.4	22.4	6.3	1.6
2010	Geelong	39	22	1	2	271	240	511	159	49	0.0	0.1	12.3	10.9	23.2	7.2	2.2
2011	Geelong	39	14	3	0	135	120	255	76	24	0.2	0.0	9.6	8.6	18.2	5.4	1.7
Career			292	94	60	3047	2476	5523	1687	674	0.3	0.2	10.4	8.5	18.9	5.8	2.3

== Honours and achievements ==
Brownlow Medal votes
Season	Votes
1997	—
1998	—
1999	5
2000	—
2001	2
2002	6
2003	2
2004	3
2005	4
2006	1
2007	—
2008	—
Total	23
Key:
Red / Italics = Ineligible

Team:

- AFL Premiership (Geelong): 2007, 2009
- AFL McClelland Trophy (Geelong): 2007, 2008
- AFL NAB Cup (Geelong): 2006, 2009

Individual:

- AFL:
  - All-Australian: 2007
  - Australian representative honours in international rules football: 2005
  - All-Australian nomination: 2008
  - AFL Rising Star nomination: 1998
- Geelong Football Club:
  - Member of the Geelong F.C. Hall of Fame
  - Geelong F.C. "Best team and most constructive player" award: 2005
- TAC Cup:
  - Team of the Year: 1995

Milestones:

- AFL debut: Round 1, 1997 (vs. Richmond) at the MCG (Geelong lost by 9 points)
- Finals debut: Qualifying final, 1997 (vs. North Melbourne) at the MCG (Geelong lost by 18 points)
- 50th game: Round 4, 2000 (vs. North Melbourne) at the Telstra Dome (Geelong lost by 5 points)
- 100th game: Round 18, 2002 (vs. North Melbourne) at Skilled Stadium (Geelong lost by 64 points)
- 150th game: Round 8, 2005 (vs. Carlton) at Telstra Dome (Geelong won by 70 points)
- 200th game: Round 12, 2007 (vs. Brisbane Lions) at Skilled Stadium (Geelong won by 50 points)
- 250th game: Round 18, 2009 (vs. Adelaide) at Skilled Stadium (Geelong won by 2 points)

== Tribunal history ==
Season	Round	Charge category (level)	Victim	Result	Verdict	Ref(s)
2001	22	Charging	Stephen Silvagni (Carlton)	Guilty (lost at tribunal)	3-match suspension
2007	20	Interference with opponent	Shannon Grant (North Melbourne)	Guilty (early plea)	$600 fine
2008	18	Rough conduct (4)	Shane Edwards (Richmond)	Guilty (won at tribunal)	1-match suspension

Although he mostly kept out of trouble throughout his career, Milburn had two notable tribunal cases.

- In 2001, he was suspended for three weeks for charging, after he knocked out Carlton's Stephen Silvagni with a hip to the head late in Geelong's last match for the year; there was also discussion of charging Milburn for 'bringing the game into disrepute', when he provocatively clapped to the Carlton crowd as it booed him from the ground, but he did not have to formally face this charge. He was never forgiven by Carlton fans, who booed him for the rest of his career.
- In 2008, Milburn was suspended for one week for rough conduct against Richmond's Shane Edwards. In the incident, Milburn pinned Edwards' arms in a tackle and slung him into the ground, causing Edwards' unprotected head hit the ground. Milburn was able to successfully—but controversially—argue the contact should be viewed as body contact rather than head-high contact because Milburn never contacted Edwards' head himself; this reduced his suspension from three matches to one. This case was the most prominent of four cases which led directly to the establishment of "dangerous tackle" as a tribunal charge distinct from "rough conduct" from the 2009 season onwards.

== Personal life ==
Milburn is married to his teenage sweetheart, Tania, with whom he has had two children.
