= Victoria Australian rules football team =

Australian rules football representative team

Victoria
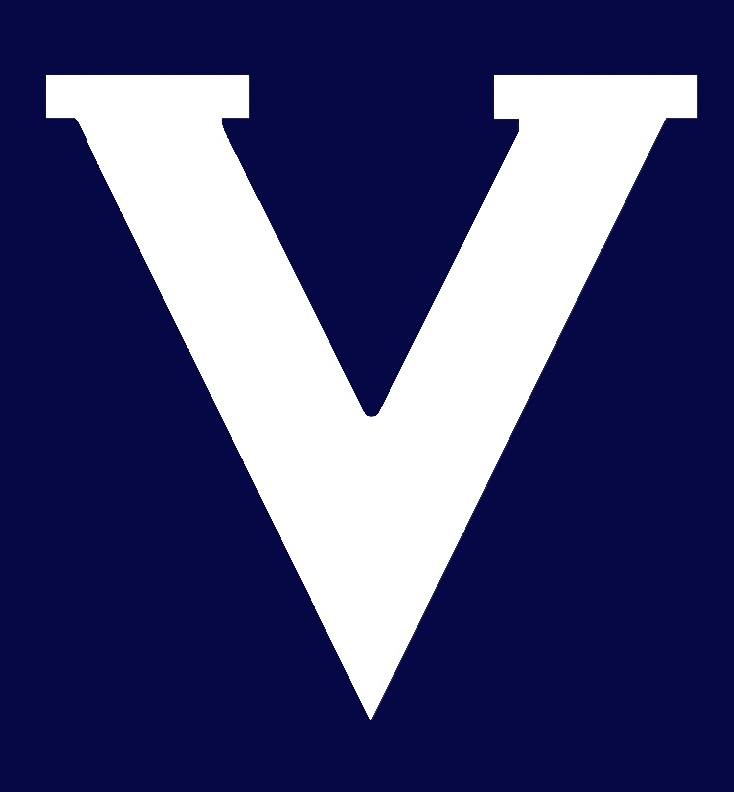

Team information
- Nicknames: The Big V The Vics
- Governing body: Australian Football League; Victorian Football League
- Home stadium: Melbourne Cricket Ground
- First game
- (Victoria (state)) Victoria 7–0 South Australia; 1879

The Victoria Australian rules football team, known colloquially as the Big V, is the state representative side of Victoria, Australia, in the sport of Australian rules football.

The Big V has a long history, having debuted in 1879. It was a dominant team during the first 100 years of intercolonial-interstate competition. After the change to State of Origin rules in 1977, the results with the other main Australian football states became more even.

Victoria has a long and intense rivalry with South Australia and Western Australia. The Victorian and South Australian rivalry was characterised by the catchcry in South Australia called "Kick a Vic", and fans would bring signs of the cry to the games. Some of the games between Victoria, South Australia, and Western Australia in the 1980s and 1990s have been regarded as some of the greatest games in the history of Australian football. Victoria's last appearance against another state at open level was in 1999 when it defeated South Australia.

Since the AFL Commission ended representative football in 1999, the Big V has seldom appeared at senior level. In 1989, the AFL split Victoria into two representative teams for junior matches: Vic Metro and Vic Country (Vic Metro being the strongest of the two). The team has been reassembled for special occasions, including the AFL Hall of Fame Tribute Match in 2008 and special charity events such as the State of Origin for Bushfire Relief Match in 2020, winning both matches.

While the Big V no longer regularly appears, Victoria continues to be regularly represented at junior (underage national championships), state league, amateur and masters level (notably the E. J. Whitten Legends Game). The Big V women's team also competed against the Allies as part of the 2017 AFL Women's season.

== History ==
=== Intercolonial football ===
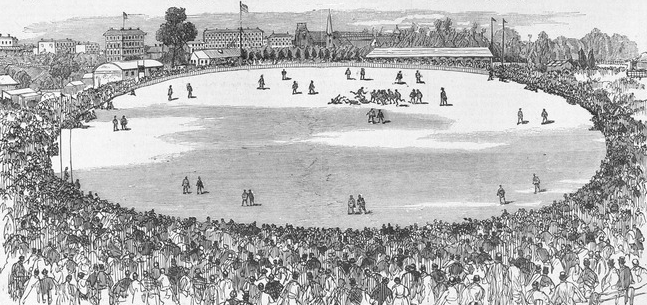
Victoria vs South Australia at the East Melbourne Cricket Ground in 1879

Victorian representative teams have participated in games against other Australian states since the 1870s. The first full intercolonial representative match was Victoria v South Australia (1879). Originally these games were played between teams representing the major leagues of each state.

The first intercolonial representative game of football was played between Victoria and South Australia in 1879 with teams made up of Victorian Football Association and South Australia Football Association players. Even after the introduction of the VFL in 1897, the VFA would continue to be the premier Victorian team. Though the VFL became active in interstate football following the Federation of Australia and eventually became the premier Victorian side, the VFA was the only league interested in regular competition with other representative sides prior to Federation. The Victorian Association played numerous matches against South Australia during this era which were evenly contested. During this era, the VFA side wore a sash whereas the VFL side wore predominantly navy.

=== Interstate football ===
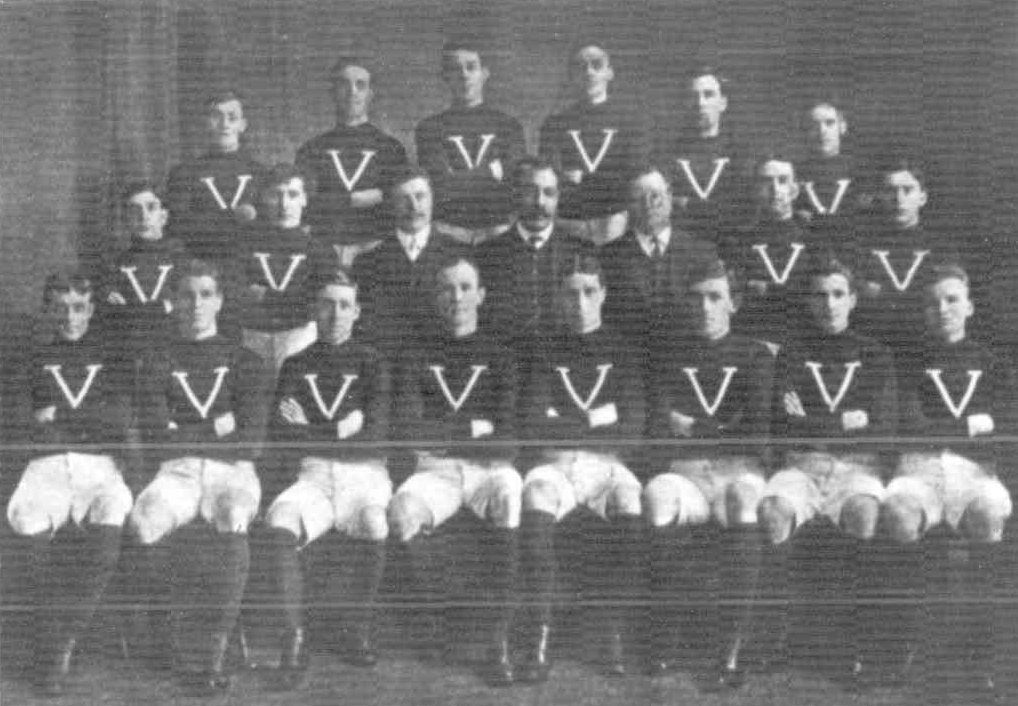
Victoria's 1908 team

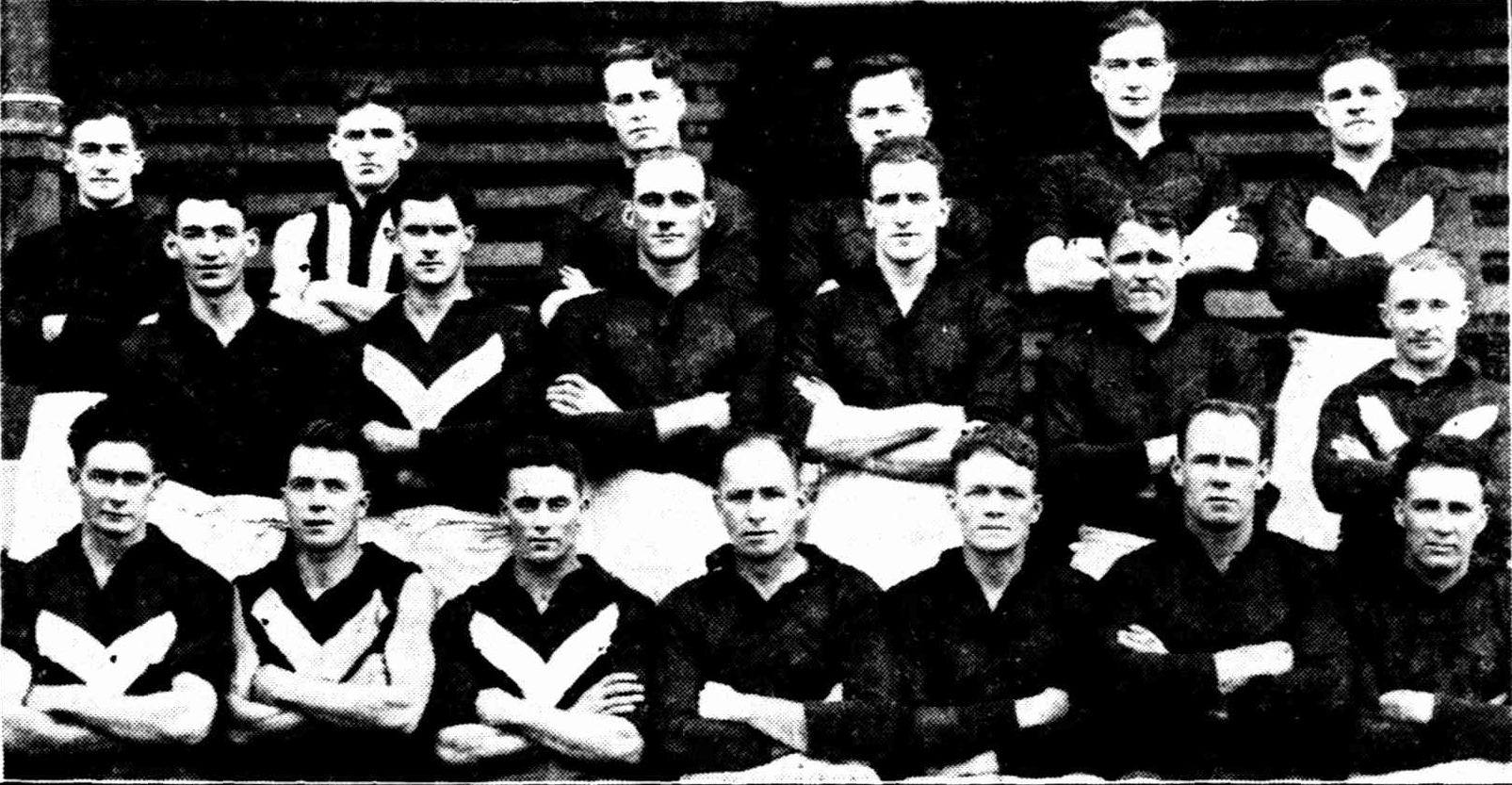
The Big V team of 1928. Back Row: Jack Moriarty (Fitzroy), Albert Collier (Collingwood), Hugh Dunbar (Melbourne), Gordon Coventry (Collingwood), Bob Johnson (Melbourne), Jack Baggott (Richmond); Second Row: Jack Vosti (Essendon), Charlie Stanbridge (South Melbourne), Arthur Stevens (Footscray), Alex Duncan (Carlton), Dick Taylor (Melbourne), Ted Baker (Geelong); Front Row: Basil McCormack (Richmond), Arthur Rayson (Geelong), Allan Geddes (Richmond) vice-captain, Syd Coventry (Collingwood) captain, Barney Carr (St Kilda), Arthur Coghlan (Geelong), Herbert White (Melbourne).

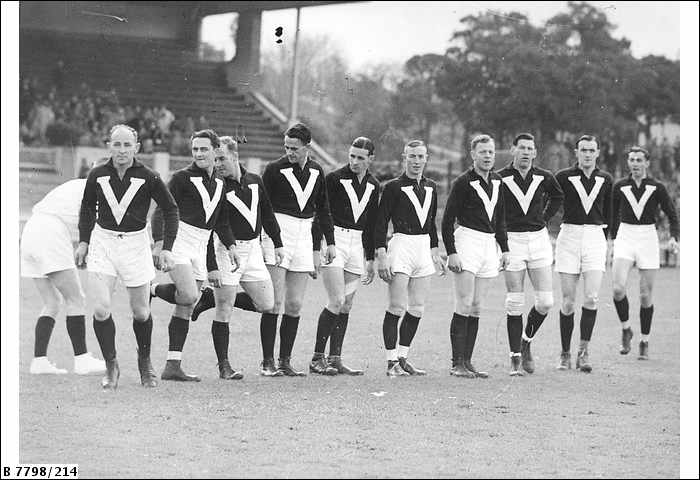
The Big V team in 1938. Players pictured include Des Fothergill (Collingwood), Dick Reynolds (Essendon), Jock Cordner (North Melbourne), Jim Park (Carlton), Jack Dyer (Richmond), Phonse Kyne (Collingwood), and Norman Ware (Footscray).

In 1908, the first composite VFL/VFA side competed in interstate matches, dominated by VFL players it wore the Big V insignia for the first time.

Interstate matches came to be viewed as the highest tier of Australian football, with each state's ultimate goal being that of beating Victoria. The most important of these games were the Australian National Football Carnival games which were played intermittently between 1908 and 1993. Victoria has a dominant record in the carnivals, winning 17 and coming runner-up in another 6.

=== Two Team Era: 1950–1966 ===
Between 1950 and 1966, the Victorian Football League (VFL) and the Victorian Football Association (VFA) each fielded a team at carnivals, with the VFL team the stronger of the two.

=== State of Origin Era 1977–1999 ===
Between 1977 and 1999 senior state football was played under State of Origin rules.

Victoria's final senior level State of Origin game against another state, participated in by AFL, players was played in 1999 with Victoria beating South Australia by 54 points.

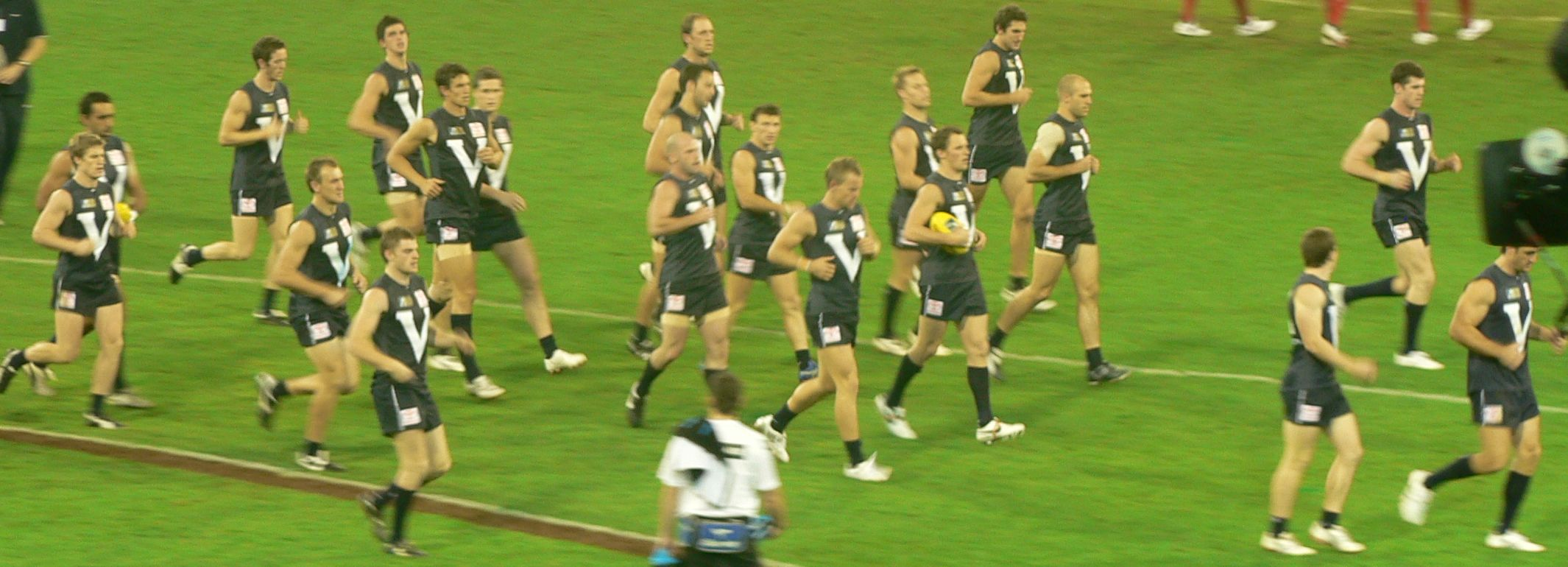
The Big V running out for the AFL Hall of Fame Tribute Match in 2008. (From left to right – Luke Power, Adam Goodes, Robert Murphy, Darren Milburn, Scott Pendlebury, Heath Shaw, Troy Simmonds, Trent Croad, Paul Chapman, Josh Fraser, Jimmy Bartel, Brent Harvey, Ryan O'Keefe, Sam Mitchell, James Kelly, Jarrad Waite, Chris Judd, Jonathan Brown (captain), Daniel Bradshaw.)

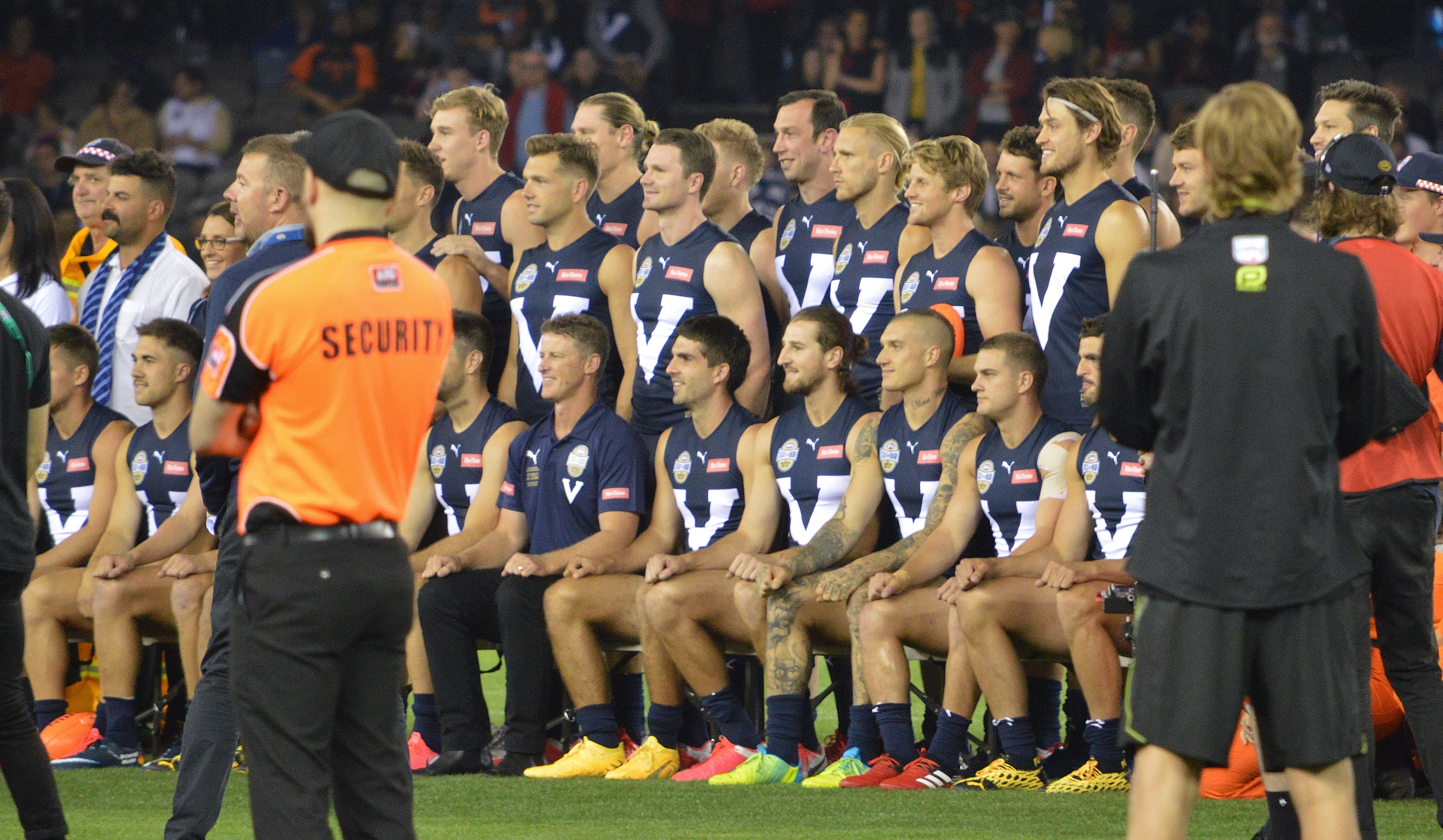
2020 Bushfire Relief match team

Since the discontinuation of regular interstate competition, the senior Big V has only appeared on two occasions. A Victorian senior team was assembled in 2008 for the AFL Hall of Fame Tribute Match to celebrate 150 years of the sport. The game was a high-scoring one with 39 goals scored, Victoria winning 21.11 (137) to the Dream Team 18.12 (120). In 2020, the side again appeared in a special match, the State of Origin for Bushfire Relief Match. Both matches were well attended.

== Identity ==
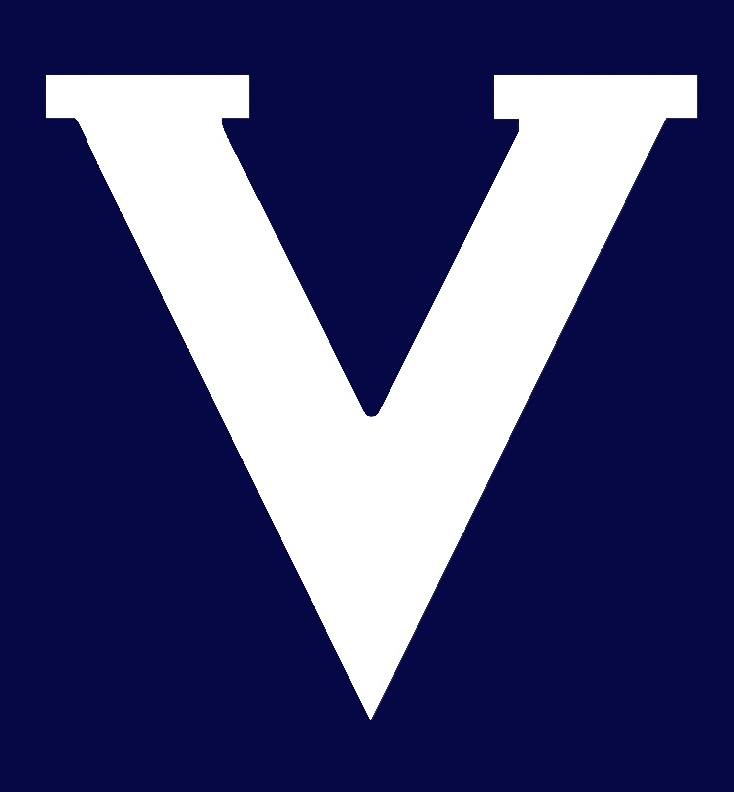
The Big V white insignia and navy blue

The Victorian state football team wears a navy blue guernsey (State colours are Navy Blue, White and Silver) along with a stylistic white "Big V" insignia on the front representing the initial of Victoria. The current nickname "Big V" had its origins during State of Origin era.

=== History of the guernsey and Big V nickname ===
The team has not always worn or been known as the Big V. Prior to the advent of the iconic Big V guernsey, the team wore various designs. Early in the 20th century, the kit was a white guernsey with a sash. Later, it wore a plain navy guernsey with white-and-silver pin stripes along the sleeves.

The symbol now synonymous with the team first appeared during the 1908 Melbourne carnival (other states also had their first initial on their guernsey). Early mainstream media mentions of the words "Big V" associated with the football team were in reference to the jumper rather than the team for example during 1911 Adelaide Carnival. A rare mention in 1929 of players "gracing the big V, the hallmark in the football world in Australia" appeared in the Argus. For a period in the 1920s, the guernsey design featured a white chevron across the chest in place of the letter V; however, this only lasted a few years. Even in the 1953 Adelaide Carnival the term 'Big Vee' complex was used in reference to South Australia's fear of the guernsey rather than the Victorian team itself. The first mention of the Big V nickname for the team arose in the middle of the State of Origin era primarily from South Australians. It was popularised in Victoria from 1987, after which the local media began to regularly headline it.

== Uniforms ==
1890	1893	1894	1899	1900	1903 (June)
1903 (August)	1904	1905	1905 (VFL On Front)	1908-1919 (Various V Fonts)	1920
1921	1924	1927	1928-1929 (Various V Fonts)	1930	1931 (June)
1931 (August)	1932 (June 6)	1932 (June 11)	1932 (August)	1933 (Carnival)	1936
1937	1945	1946	1948	1950	1962
1967	1976	1977 (vs Tas.)	1979-1984	1985	1986
1987 (vs SA/WA)	1988	1989 (vs SA/WA)	1989 (vs Tas.)	1990 (vs Tas.)	1991 (vs SA/WA)
1992 (vs SA/WA)	1993-1999	2008	2020	2026 (vs WA)

== Honour of playing for Victoria ==
There is great pride in wearing the Victorian jumper. Ted Whitten, a former Victorian selector and coach, said that "the players would walk on broken glass to wear the Victorian jumper".

Many players have spoken about the honour of playing for Victoria. Matthew Lloyd once said that it was "immense pride – you feel like you walk a bit taller when you pull on the Big V". Paul Roos has stated "there seemed to be an aura about that navy blue jumper with the big white V". Gary Ablett Sr has said, "I've always found it a tremendous honour to represent your state, in a State of Origin game." Garry Lyon has stated about playing for Victoria that he "loved it", and has been quoted about captaining Victoria, saying: "it was a great honour". Tony Lockett is known as a big supporter of Victoria, and he said after he won the E. J. Whitten Medal that "this will probably go down as one of the happiest days of my life, and I'll treasure it forever". Brent Harvey, Gerard Healy, Greg Williams and Simon Madden are also big supporters of Victoria.

== Rivalries ==
=== South Australia ===
The Victoria and South Australia rivalry was the strongest in interstate football. Although there is a bitter rivalry on both sides, the make-up of the rivalry is slightly different. Victoria being the most successful state in interstate football, meant protecting that reputation was of prominent importance. For South Australia, the rivalry stemmed from dislike, and the feeling that Victoria don't give them the credit they deserve.

In 1991, John Cahill, the coach of South Australia, commented on Victoria after they had some injuries, saying: "they make excuses and they're quick to rubbish people"; he also claimed that the Victorians were "loud mouths and very dishonest". Before the game, a newspaper in Adelaide had printed a headline "SA will smash these pansies". After Victoria won Ted Whitten, a Victorian selector showed the paper to the camera.

Garry Lyon has commented on games in South Australia against Victoria, saying that fans in Adelaide absolutely loved those games. He added that the fans in attendance were "hostile and maniacal", noting that "by the time the games came around they were whipped into a frenzy".

Paul Roos has described the first state game he played in South Australia, remarking: "when walking up the entrance and onto Football Park was an experience in itself. I quickly realised how much hatered [sic] existed towards Victorians and their football."

The 1989 Victoria versus South Australia game at the MCG was the highest-attended interstate match, with 91,960 attending and 10,000 people turned away at the gate. After South Australia had won the last three encounters, including the final of the Interstate Carnival the year before, the game had the build-up of a grand final with high anticipation. After the game, famous former Victorian player Bob Skilton said: "Victoria can be proud it put football in this state back where it belongs".

Neil Kerley has stated that beating Victoria was the ultimate in football in South Australia. After stating that, the interviewer said, "you've got premierships as a player and coach", but Kerley followed up with "they were great", but he continued to emphasise that it, according to him, was the ultimate achievement. Neil Kerley has also stated before an Interstate Carnival grand final with Victoria that "I don't like the Victorians and I think the South Australians are every bit as good".

Ben Hart has talked about South Australia playing Victoria, saying: "the games against Victoria have always been such huge occasions for South Australians".

Brett Chalmers was quoted saying before South Australia played Victoria in 1992, "I'd love to beat the Victorians, every South Australian doesn't like the Victorians, it'll be great to beat them".

Ted Whitten has stated about playing against South Australia that "we hate to be beaten". He also stated, after a game in 1992 that Victoria narrowly lost, that "geez it's hard to cop it over here when you get beaten".

=== Western Australia ===
Western Australia's rivalry stems from dislike coming from a number of reasons, like a feeling in Western Australia that Victoria never gave them the credit they deserve, despite some of the best players of all time coming from the state. It has been described that Western Australia has disdain for Victoria. Some games widely regarded as some of the best in the history of Australian football were played between Victoria and Western Australia in the 1980s.

Leigh Matthews in a game against Western Australia knocked out Barry Cable with a high hit, at Subiaco Oval. The incident caused an enormous amount of angst in Western Australia.

Shane Parker, a former Western Australia player, has stated about his memories of State of Origin growing up: "When I was a kid the State of Origin games were the greatest ever. It was a really big thing to see the WA side play, particularly against Victoria".

The entire Western Australian team that won the 1961 Interstate Carnival was inducted into the Western Australian Hall of Champions, because they won a breakthrough carnival, which had been dominated by Victoria.

== Notable State of Origin games ==
Victoria has been involved in some of the most notable interstate games in the history of Australian football. These include:

1984: Victoria 16.12 (108) d. South Australia 16.8 (104). A packed house at Football Park set the stage for a thriller. Stephen Kernahan (S.A.) kicked 10 goals, Paul Salmon (Vic.) scored 5, and Peter Daicos (Vic.) scored.

1986 (Game 1): South Australia 18.17 (125) d. Victoria 17.13 (115): A high-scoring game, where Stephen Kernahan, Grenville Dietrich, and Victoria's Paul Salmon all kick 4 goals. The game also features John Platten, Tony McGuiness, Greg Williams, Dale Weightman, Chris McDermott and Dermott Brereton.

1986 (Game 2): Western Australia 21.11 (137) d. Victoria 20.14 (134). This game has been described as "the greatest State of Origin game of all time". A high-scoring and close game which saw Western Australia win in the dying stages. Gary Buckenara kicked five goals, Brian Peake kicked seven, Dale Weightman kicked five, and Brian Taylor kicked four. The game featured Greg Williams, Paul Salmon, and Maurice Rioli.

1989 (Game 2): Victoria 22.7 (149) d. South Australia 9.9 (63). Although Victoria had won Game 1 handily earlier that year by 54 points against Western Australia, South Australia were seen as a legitimate threat, as Victoria had not won a single game against South Australia since the 1984 Australian Football Championships, played five years prior, despite playing off each year (albeit one loss was a result of a technical forfeit). Despite this, various ins bolstered the Victorian line-up. Even without Ablett, Victoria's inclusion of Dermott Brereton and Tony Lockett to an already stacked line-up helped Victoria crush South Australia's chances. Nine of Victoria's 22 for this game (41%) would be future inductees into the Australian Football Hall of Fame. The game was played in front of a record-breaking game for a State of Origin (91,960), a record that stands to this day.

1993: South Australia 16.13 (109) d. Victoria 14.13 (97). A close game at the MCG saw South Australia just get home. Darren Jarman (SA) kicked six goals, while Gary Ablett Sr (Vic.) kicked five.

1992: South Australia 19.19 (133) d. Victoria 18.12 (120). Wayne Carey (SA) described this game as the reason he believed he could succeed in the AFL. In a high-scoring game, Stephen Kernahan (SA) kicked six goals, Paul Salmon (Vic) kicked five, and Paul Roos (Vic) kicked three. Wayne Carey dominated at centre half-forward and kicked two goals. South Australia won the game in the final moments.

1994: South Australia 11.9 (75) d. Victoria 10.13 (73). Another game regarded as one of the greatest games in the history of Australian football. In a close game, Darren Jarman kicked six goals, and Gary Ablett Sr scored four.

== Coaches ==
Victoria has had a total of 11 different coaches in State of Origin competition since the concept was introduced in 1977 and Bill Goggin holds the record for most wins as coach of Victoria (9). Geelong coach Chris Scott is the current coach of the Victorian State of Origin team.

Coach	Year/s	Games	Wins	Losses	Win %
Ron Barassi	1977–78	2	1	1	50%
Tom Hafey	1978, 1980	4	4	0	100%
David Parkin	1979, 1982–83	8	5	3	62.5%
Tony Jewell	1981	1	0	1	0%
Allan Jeans	1984	2	1	1	50%
Kevin Sheedy	1985–86	4	1	3	25%
Bill Goggin	1987–93	15	9	6	60%
Rod Austin	1994–96	3	2	1	66.6%
Leigh Matthews	1997–98	2	2	0	100%
Robert Walls	1999	1	1	0	100%
Chris Scott	2026	–	–	–	–

== Big V in popular culture ==
There was a song created about Victoria by Greg Champion, called "Don't Let The Big V Down", which describes a young man about to play his first state game. While he is sitting in the change rooms, a man approaches him and tells him not to let the Big V down.

The Victorian side was the first to use the "Big V" motif, which was later used by other codes; for example, the shirt of the Melbourne Victory soccer team and the Big V basketball league.

== Carnival record ==
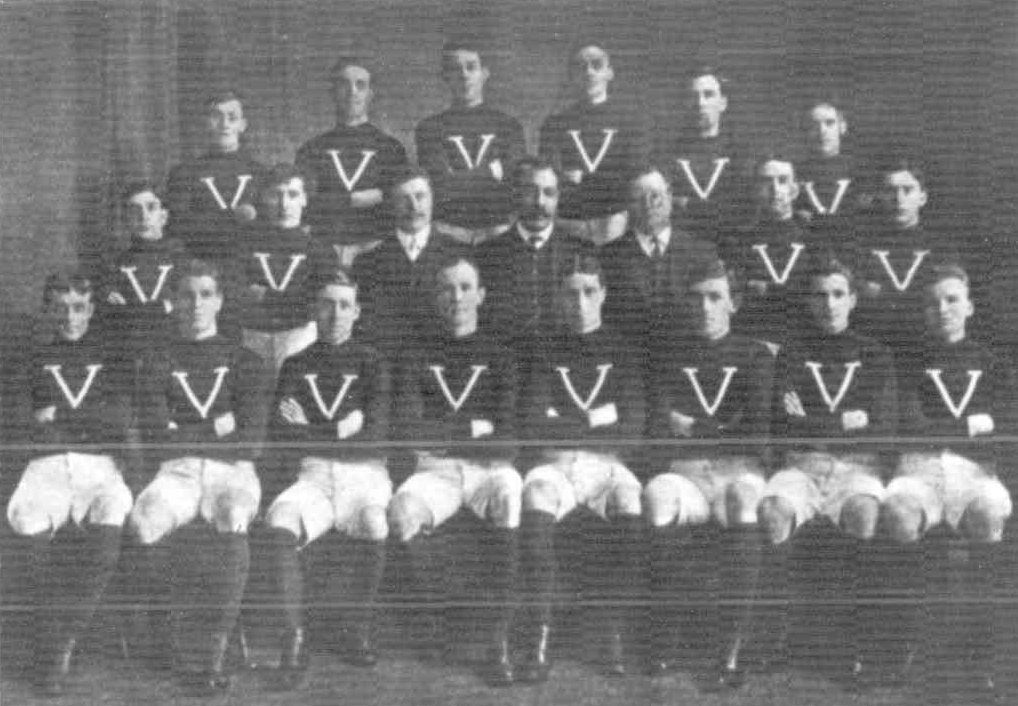
Victoria's 1908 team

=== Victorian State Team ===
- 1908: 1st
- 1911: 2nd
- 1914: 1st
- 1921: 2nd
- 1924: 1st
- 1927: 1st
- 1930: 1st
- 1933: 1st
- 1937: 1st
- 1947: 1st
- 1950: 1st
- 1953: 1st
- 1956: 1st
- 1958: 1st
- 1961: 2nd
- 1966: 1st
- 1969: 1st
- 1972: 1st
- 1975: 1st
- 1979: 2nd
- 1980: 1st
- 1988: 2nd, Division 1
- 1993: 2nd, Division 1

=== Victorian Football Association ===
- 1950: 5th
- 1953: 4th
- 1956: 5th
- 1958: 5th
- 1966: 5th
- 1988: 2nd, Division 2

=== National Under 18 Championships ===
- Victoria (1976–1988) 9: 1976, 1977, 1981, 1982, 1983, 1984, 1986, 1987, 1988
- Vic Country (1989–) 6: 1989, 1992 (Div 2), 1994 (Div 2), 2000, 2003, 2010
- Vic Metro (1989–) 14: 1990, 1992, 1993, 1994, 1996, 1997, 1998, 2000, 2001, 2002, 2004, 2005, 2006, 2008, 2011

== Ted Whitten ==
Ted Whitten, nicknamed "Mr Football", was one of the most famous Victorian players of all time. He represented the state 29 times and was the most influential figure for the Big V. He was known for his passionate support for interstate football and is honoured with the E. J. Whitten Medal and the E. J. Whitten Legends Game. Many other notable players represented Victoria on numerous occasions, including Gary Ablett Sr. Dale Weightman, Paul Roos and Robert Harvey.

== E. J. Whitten Medal ==
The E. J. Whitten Medal is awarded to the best player in a Victorian team. The medal was first awarded in 1985.

== AFL Women's ==
Following the 2017 AFL Women's season, the AFL announced the formation of a Victorian state of origin team for the best female players in the AFL Women's league. The team has played a match against Allies.

== Other state teams ==
The Victorian Football League has a representative state team that plays annually against the other state league teams. The Victorian Amateur Football Association also has a representative team that plays annually against the other state amateur leagues and local Victorian leagues. There was also a women's Victorian representative team that played annually in the defunct AFL Women's National Championships and which was the most successful team. A Victorian team also competes in an annual veterans game, called the E. J. Whitten Legends Game. Many past AFL greats participate in the game.

In under-16 to -19 pathway football, Victoria is split into Vic Metro (representing players from the Melbourne metropolitan area) and Vic Country (representing players from regional Victoria). These teams compete in competitions such as the AFL Under-18 Championships for boys and the AFL Women's Under-18 Championships for girls.
