= Luke Jackson =

Luke Jackson may refer to:

== Arts and entertainment ==
- Luke Jackson (singer), British singer
- Luke Jackson, the title character of Cool Hand Luke, portrayed by Paul Newman
- Luke Jackson, author of Freaks, Geeks, and Asperger Syndrome

== Sports ==
- Luke Jackson (baseball), (born 1991), American baseball player
- Luke Jackson (basketball, born 1981), American basketball player in the 2000s
- Lucious Jackson (1941–2022), also known as Luke Jackson, American basketball player in the 1960s and 1970s
- Luke Jackson (boxer) (born 1985), Australian amateur boxer
- Luke Jackson (footballer) (born 2001), Australian rules footballer
