= Representative side =

Sports terminology

In sports a national representative side or team is one that plays under the national name. The phrase is often used to indicate that the team is not the official main national team. Such unofficial or subsidiary teams are usually legitimate but rarely exist for longer than a single game or competition.

== Representative sides that were not the main team ==
=== Association Football ===
- England 2002—A secondary team competed in the UEFA Regions' Cup in Estonia.

=== Cricket ===
- England 1880—Lord Harris assembled a team to meet the Australians at The Oval in the fourth test match after Marylebone Cricket Club had rebuffed the visitors in response to the Sydney Riot of 1879.
