= Geelong Football Club draft and trade history =

The Geelong Football Club has participated in the Australian Football League (AFL) Draft since it was first established in 1986, when it was known as the Victorian Football League (VFL).

== VFL/AFL ==
=== Draft selections ===
A mid-season draft was held each year from 1990 to 1993, allowing clubs to add players during the season. Since 2016, clubs have had the option of nominating category B rookies to directly join their club's rookie list, rather than via the Rookie Draft as previously required.

Table key
| ^ | Father–son selection | RE | Rookie elevation | B | Category B rookie |
| ^{‡} | Re-drafted player after delisting | ^{+} | Free agency compensation pick | ← | Selection was traded from another club (Note: e.g. ←Essendon ←North Melbourne (selection originally held by Essendon, who traded it to North Melbourne, who on-traded it to Geelong)) |

Table of selections, with players' original clubs and leagues
| Draft | Pick | Player | Recruited from | Note(s) | Ref. |
|---|---|---|---|---|---|
| 1986 national draft | 5 | Michael Taylor | Port Fairy | | |
| 1986 national draft | 18 | Mark O'Keefe | Warrnambool | | |
| 1986 national draft | 31 | Glen Keast | North Gambier | | |
| 1986 national draft | 44 | Tim Britt | Dunnstown | | |
| 1986 national draft | 57 | Michael Billman | Boort | | |
| 1987 national draft | 8 | Darren Jones | Moe | | |
| 1987 national draft | 21 | Shane Korth | Natimuk | | |
| 1987 national draft | 34 | Stephen Hewitt | Warracknabeal | | |
| 1987 national draft | 47 | Stephen McQueen | North Hobart | | |
| 1987 national draft | 60 | Pat Gribble | Traralgon | | |
| 1988 national draft | 6 | Ray Sterrett | East Fremantle | | |
| 1988 national draft | 20 | Adrian Fletcher | Glenorchy | | |
| 1988 national draft | 34 | Daryn Cresswell | Glenorchy | | |
| 1988 national draft | 62 | David Welsby | Sturt | | |
| 1988 national draft | 76 | David Preston | Bairnsdale | | |
| 1988 national draft | 90 | Kym Nicholls | Norwood | | |
| 1988 national draft | 104 | Andrew Gribble | St Peters | | |
| 1989 national draft | 59 | Daniel Frawley | Wangaratta | | |
| 1989 national draft | 73 | Tim Birthisel | Inglewood | | |
| 1989 national draft | 87 | Ashley Coutts | Kaniva | | |
| 1989 national draft | 101 | Richard Harrison | South Adelaide | | |
| 1989 national draft | 113 | Shane Crothers | Grovedale | | |
| 1989 national draft | 115 | Colum McManamon | | International player (Gaelic football) | |
| 1990 mid-season draft | 7 | Darren Bartsch | West Adelaide | | |
| 1990 mid-season draft | 21 | Luke Hampshire | Tyrendarra | | |
| 1990 mid-season draft | 31 | Damian Hancock | Leitchville | | |
| 1990 national draft | 1 | Stephen Hooper | East Perth | | |
| 1990 national draft | 5 | Stewart Devlin | Horsham | | |
| 1990 national draft | 17 | Brendan Hehir | Darley | | |
| 1990 national draft | 29 | Byron Donnellan | Donald | | |
| 1990 national draft | 43 | Glen Thomlinson | Rochester | | |
| 1990 national draft | 57 | Chris Barzen | Mooroopna | | |
| 1990 national draft | 71 | Dennis Ryan | Kyabram | | |
| 1990 national draft | 85 | Brad Dowling | Mooroopna | | |
| 1991 pre-season draft | 5 | Sean Simpson | St Kilda (AFL) | | |
| 1991 pre-season draft | 11 | Jamie Lamb | St Kilda (AFL) | | |
| 1991 pre-season draft | 21 | Adrian Menara | North Melbourne (AFL) | | |
| 1991 pre-season draft | 28 | Russell Merriman | St Joseph's | | |
| 1991 pre-season draft | 42 | Stephen Jankowicz | East Gambier | | |
| 1991 mid-season draft | 11 | Trevor Spencer | Melbourne (AFL) | | |
| 1991 mid-season draft | 24 | Steven Handley | Swan Districts | | |
| 1991 mid-season draft | 34 | Dean Smith | St Joseph's | | |
| 1991 mid-season draft | 40 | Darren Enever | Werribee | | |
| 1991 mid-season draft | 42 | Tony Lithgow | Casterton | | |
| 1991 mid-season draft | 43 | Brad Nicholls | Bell Park | | |
| 1991 mid-season draft | 44 | Robert Gilbert | South Barwon | | |
| 1991 national draft | 9 | Stephen O'Reilly | Swan Districts | | |
| 1991 national draft | 11 | Leigh Willison | East Perth | | |
| 1991 national draft | 35 | Darryl Donald | Wangaratta | | |
| 1991 national draft | 62 | Peter Maclean | Seymour | | |
| 1991 national draft | 73 | Cameron Burke | Warragul | | |
| 1991 national draft | 83 | Peter Jacks | Ballarat YCW | | |
| 1992 pre-season draft | 12 | Tim McGrath | North Melbourne (AFL) | | |
| 1992 pre-season draft | 26 | Garry Phillips | Geelong (AFL) | | |
| 1992 pre-season draft | 40 | Ben Graham | Geelong (AFL) | | |
| 1992 mid-season draft | 14 | Andrew Macnish | Subiaco | | |
| 1992 mid-season draft | 27 | Mark Ballan | Western Jets | | |
| 1992 mid-season draft | 37 | Darren King | Southern Stringrays | | |
| 1992 national draft | 18 | Leigh Colbert | South Bendigo | | |
| 1992 national draft | 33 | Corey Robertson | Burnie Hawks | | |
| 1992 national draft | 48 | Andrew Osborn | South Adelaide | | |
| 1992 national draft | 63 | Mathew McMurray | Perth | | |
| 1992 national draft | 65 | Gerard Power | Northern Knights | | |
| 1992 national draft | 78 | Damien Crowe | De La Salle College | | |
| 1992 national draft | 93 | Adam Shanahan | South Bendigo | | |
| 1992 national draft | 108 | Bryan Beinke | Port Adelaide | | |
| 1993 pre-season draft | 18 | Mathew McMartin | Colac | | |
| 1993 pre-season draft | 34 | Shane Crothers | Grovedale | | |
| 1993 pre-season draft | 48 | Mark Ballan | Geelong (AFL) | | |
| 1993 pre-season draft | 61 | Daniel Fletcher | Geelong Falcons | | |
| 1993 pre-season draft | 70 | Shayne Breuer | Woodville-West Torrens | | |
| 1993 pre-season draft | 77 | Damon Lukins | Claremont | | |
| 1993 mid-season draft | 9 | John Cunningham | Port Melbourne | | |
| 1993 mid-season draft | 21 | Cristian O'Brien | Norwood | | |
| 1993 mid-season draft | 27 | Stephan Cochrane | Richmond (AFL) | | |
| 1994 national draft | —N/a | James McLure | Geelong (reserves) | Pre-draft supplementary selection | |
| 1994 national draft | 17 | Carl Steinfort | Central Dragons | | |
| 1994 national draft | 18 | Robert Di Rosa | Western Jets | | |
| 1994 national draft | 36 | Matthew Robbins | Central Dragons | | |
| 1994 national draft | 69 | Dean Helmers | Western Jets | | |
| 1994 national draft | 70 | Adam Benjamin | Assumption College | | |
| 1994 national draft | 81 | Tim Allen | Hawthorn (reserves) | | |
| 1995 pre-season draft | 16 | Derek Hall | West Perth | | |
| 1995 pre-season draft | 30 | Dean Talbot | East Perth | | |
| 1995 pre-season draft | —N/a | Adam Houlihan | Murray Bushrangers | Compensation selection | |
| 1995 pre-season draft | —N/a | Steven King | Murray Bushrangers | Compensation selection | |
| 1995 national draft | 34 | Jason Snell | Eastern Ranges | | |
| 1995 national draft | 39 | Glenn Kilpatrick | West Adelaide | | |
| 1995 national draft | 48 | Darren Milburn | Calder Cannons | | |
| 1995 national draft | 49 | Ronnie Burns | St Mary's | | |
| 1995 national draft | 61 | Daniel Lowther | Northern Knights | | |
| 1995 national draft | 68 | Brady Anderson | East Perth | | |
| 1995 national draft | 73 | Stuart Lamond | Woodville-West Torrens | | |
| 1995 national draft | 75 | Clint Bizzell | Kedron Grange | | |
| 1995 national draft | —N/a | Simon Fletcher^ | Geelong Falcons | Son of Gary Fletcher (non-player) | |
| 1996 pre-season draft | No selections held | | | | |
| 1996 national draft | 8 | Leigh Brockman | Tassie Mariners | | |
| 1996 national draft | 18 | Gerrard Bennett | Tassie Mariners | | |
| 1996 national draft | 43 | Paul Corrigan | Melbourne (reserves) | | |
| 1997 pre-season draft | No selections held | | | | |
| 1997 rookie draft | 9 | Michael Brown | Fitzroy (reserves) | | |
| 1997 rookie draft | 24 | Shawn Lewfatt | Essendon (AFL) | | |
| 1997 rookie draft | 39 | Pass | | | |
| 1997 rookie draft | 54 | Pass | | | |
| 1997 rookie draft | 69 | Pass | | | |
| 1997 rookie draft | 84 | Pass | | | |
| 1997 national draft | 15 | Joel McKay | Murray Bushrangers | | |
| 1997 national draft | 29 | Marc Woolnough^ | Southport | Son of Michael Woolnough | |
| 1997 national draft | 38 | James Rahilly | Geelong Falcons | | |
| 1997 national draft | 45 | Matthew Scarlett^ | Geelong Falcons | Son of John Scarlett | |
| 1997 national draft | 54 | Justin Wood | Tassie Mariners | | |
| 1997 national draft | 61 | Tim Finocchiaro | Eastern Ranges | | |
| 1998 pre-season draft | No selections held | | | | |
| 1998 rookie draft | 7 | George Bakoulas | Calder Cannons | | |
| 1998 rookie draft | 12 | Paul Lindsay | East Fremantle | | |
| 1998 rookie draft | 29 | Chris Hemley | St Kilda (AFL) | | |
| 1998 rookie draft | 44 | Shaun Baxter | Western Bulldogs (AFL) | | |
| 1998 rookie draft | 60 | Pass | | | |
| 1998 rookie draft | 76 | Pass | | | |
| 1998 rookie draft | 92 | Pass | | | |
| 1998 national draft | 17 | Peter Street | Tassie Mariners | | |
| 1998 national draft | 21 | David A. Clarke^ | Geelong Falcons | Son of David Clarke | |
| 1998 national draft | 24 | David Wojcinski | Gippsland Power | | |
| 1999 pre-season draft | No selections held | | | | |
| 1999 rookie draft | 5 | Derek Wirth | Brisbane Lions (AFL) | | |
| 1999 rookie draft | 11 | Gerard Bennett | Sydney (AFL) | | |
| 1999 rookie draft | 20 | Danny O'Brien | Gippsland Power | | |
| 1999 national draft | 8 | Joel Corey | East Perth | | |
| 1999 national draft | 15 | David Spriggs | Prahran Dragons | | |
| 1999 national draft | 17 | Ezra Bray | Calder Cannons | | |
| 1999 national draft | 23 | Daniel Foster | Port Adelaide (SANFL) | | |
| 1999 national draft | 31 | Paul Chapman | Calder Cannons | | |
| 1999 national draft | 38 | Cameron Ling | Geelong Falcons | | |
| 1999 national draft | 47 | Corey Enright | Port Adelaide (SANFL) | | |
| 1999 national draft | RE | Paul Lindsay | Geelong (AFL) | | |
| 2000 pre-season draft | No selections held | | | | |
| 2000 rookie draft | 6 | Marcus Baldwin | Hawthorn (reserves) | | |
| 2000 rookie draft | 22 | Shane Ryan | Oakleigh Chargers | | |
| 2000 rookie draft | 38 | Brent Cowell | St Kilda (reserves) | | |
| 2000 national draft | 44 | Josh Hunt | Bendigo Pioneers | | |
| 2000 national draft | 71 | Daniel Lowther | Geelong (AFL) | Re-drafted after being delisted | |
| 2000 national draft | 79 | Hamish Simpson | Geelong (AFL) | Re-drafted after being delisted | |
| 2000 national draft | RE | Danny O'Brien | Geelong (AFL) | | |
| 2001 pre-season draft | No selections held | | | | |
| 2001 rookie draft | 10 | Paul Chambers | Western U18 | | |
| 2001 rookie draft | 26 | Sam Chapman | Geelong U18 | | |
| 2001 rookie draft | 41 | Max Rooke | Casterton | | |
| 2001 rookie draft | 54 | Tim Clark | Geelong (VFL) | | |
| 2001 national draft | 8 | Jimmy Bartel | Geelong Falcons | | |
| 2001 national draft | 17 | James Kelly | Calder Cannons | | |
| 2001 national draft | 23 | Charlie Gardiner | Sandringham Dragons | | |
| 2001 national draft | 24 | Steve Johnson | Murray Bushrangers | | |
| 2001 national draft | 40 | Gary Ablett Jr.^ | Geelong Falcons | Son of Gary Ablett Sr. | |
| 2001 national draft | 41 | Henry Playfair | NSW/ACT Rams | | |
| 2001 national draft | 69 | Matthew McCarthy | Old Xaverians | | |
| 2001 national draft | 81 | David Johnson | Essendon (VFL) | | |
| 2001 national draft | RE | Marcus Baldwin | Geelong (AFL) | | |
| 2002 pre-season draft | 2 | Aaron Lord | Hawthorn (AFL) | | |
| 2002 rookie draft | 5 | Andrew Carrazzo | Oakleigh U18 | | |
| 2002 rookie draft | 21 | Will Slade | Oakleigh U18 | | |
| 2002 rookie draft | 36 | Adam Chatfield | Carlton (AFL) | | |
| 2002 national draft | 7 | Andrew Mackie | Glenelg | | |
| 2002 national draft | 23 | Tom Lonergan | Calder Cannons | | |
| 2002 national draft | 36 | Tim Callan^ | Geelong Falcons | Son of Terry Callan | |
| 2002 national draft | 52 | Pass | | | |
| 2002 national draft | RE | Paul Chambers | Geelong (AFL) | | |
| 2002 national draft | RE | Max Rooke | Geelong (AFL) | | |
| 2003 pre-season draft | 4 | Brent Moloney | Geelong Falcons | | |
| 2003 rookie draft | 8 | Jeffrey Smith | East Perth | | |
| 2003 rookie draft | 24 | Travis Jorgensen | Calder U18 | | |
| 2003 rookie draft | 40 | Shannon Byrnes | Murray U18 | | |
| 2003 national draft | 7 | Kane Tenace | Murray Bushrangers | | |
| 2003 national draft | 22 | Cameron Thurley | Tasmanian Devils | | |
| 2003 national draft | 38 | Mark Blake^ | Geelong Falcons | Son of Rod Blake | |
| 2003 national draft | 42 | Matthew Spencer | Swan Districts | | |
| 2003 national draft | 54 | Pass | | | |
| 2003 national draft | RE | Will Slade | Geelong (AFL) | | |
| 2004 pre-season draft | 5 | Paul Koulouriotis | Port Adelaide | | |
| 2004 rookie draft | 5 | Luke Buckland | Geelong Falcons | | |
| 2004 rookie draft | 21 | James Allan | Geelong Falcons | | |
| 2004 national draft | 32 | Brent Prismall | Western Jets | | |
| 2004 national draft | 48 | Nathan Ablett^ | Modewarre | Son of Gary Ablett Sr. | |
| 2004 national draft | 62 | Matthew Egan | Geelong (VFL) | | |
| 2004 national draft | RE | Shannon Byrnes | Geelong (AFL) | | |
| 2005 pre-season draft | No selections held | | | | |
| 2005 rookie draft | 13 | Jarrod Garth | Tasmania U18 | | |
| 2005 rookie draft | 29 | Nick Batchelor | Norwood | | |
| 2005 rookie draft | 43 | Tim Sheringham | Geelong Falcons | | |
| 2005 national draft | 15 | Travis Varcoe | Central District | | |
| 2005 national draft | 31 | Trent West | Gippsland Power | | |
| 2005 national draft | 35 | Stephen Owen | North Ballarat Rebels | | |
| 2005 national draft | 47 | Ryan Gamble | Glenelg | | |
| 2005 national draft | 61 | Mathew Stokes | Woodville-West Torrens | | |
| 2006 pre-season draft | No selections held | | | | |
| 2006 rookie draft | 12 | Todd Grima | Tassie Mariners | | |
| 2006 rookie draft | 28 | Will Slade | Geelong (AFL) | Re-drafted after being delisted | |
| 2006 rookie draft | 41 | Sam Hunt | Essendon (AFL) | | |
| 2006 national draft | 7 | Joel Selwood | Bendigo Pioneers | | |
| 2006 national draft | 25 | Nathan Djerrkura | Wanderers | | |
| 2006 national draft | 41 | Tom Hawkins^ | Sandringham Dragons | Son of Jack Hawkins | |
| 2006 national draft | 57 | Simon Hogan | Geelong Falcons | | |
| 2006 national draft | RE | Sam Hunt | Geelong (AFL) | | |
| 2007 pre-season draft | No selections held | | | | |
| 2007 rookie draft | 7 | Joel Reynolds | Essendon (AFL) | | |
| 2007 rookie draft | 23 | Liam Bedford | Claremont | | |
| 2007 rookie draft | 38 | Jason Davenport | Geelong (VFL) | | |
| 2007 rookie draft | 50 | Tom Lonergan | Geelong (AFL) | Re-drafted after being delisted | |
| 2007 national draft | 17 | Harry Taylor | East Fremantle | | |
| 2007 national draft | 34 | Dawson Simpson | Murray Bushrangers | | |
| 2007 national draft | 44 | Scott Simpson | Dandenong Stingrays | | |
| 2007 national draft | 50 | Dan McKenna | Gippsland Power | | |
| 2007 national draft | 60 | Adam Donohue^ | Geelong Falcons | Son of Larry Donohue | |
| 2007 national draft | RE | Jason Davenport | Geelong (AFL) | | |
| 2007 national draft | RE | Tom Lonergan | Geelong (AFL) | | |
| 2008 pre-season draft | No selections held | | | | |
| 2008 rookie draft | 16 | Brodie Moles | Tasmanian Devils | | |
| 2008 rookie draft | 32 | Jeremy Laidler | Calder Cannons | | |
| 2008 rookie draft | 46 | Chris Kangars | Geelong Falcons | | |
| 2008 rookie draft | 57 | Shane Mumford | Geelong (VFL) | | |
| 2008 national draft | 15 | Mitch Brown | Sandringham Dragons | | |
| 2008 national draft | 33 | Tom Gillies | Dandenong Stringrays | | |
| 2008 national draft | 39 | Steven Motlop | Wanderers | | |
| 2008 national draft | 49 | Taylor Hunt | Sandringham Dragons | | |
| 2009 pre-season draft | No selections held | | | | |
| 2009 rookie draft | 15 | Adam Varcoe | Central District | | |
| 2009 rookie draft | 31 | Bryn Weadon | North Ballarat Rebels | | |
| 2009 rookie draft | 46 | Tom Allwright | North Hobart | | |
| 2009 rookie draft | 60 | Ranga Ediriwickrama | NSW/ACT Rams | NSW AFL scholarship | |
| 2009 national draft | 17 | Daniel Menzel | Central District | | |
| 2009 national draft | 28 | Mitch Duncan | East Perth | | |
| 2009 national draft | 40 | Allen Christensen | Geelong Falcons | | |
| 2009 national draft | 42 | Nathan Vardy | Gippsland Power | | |
| 2009 national draft | 56 | Josh Cowan | North Ballarat Rebels | | |
| 2009 national draft | 65 (RE) | Jeremy Laidler | Geelong (AFL) | | |
| 2010 pre-season draft | No selections held | | | | |
| 2010 rookie draft | 21 | Jack Weston | Gippsland Power | | |
| 2010 rookie draft | 37 | Ben Johnson | Geelong (VFL) | | |
| 2010 rookie draft | 50 | James Podsiadly | Geelong (VFL) | Mature-age rookie | |
| 2010 rookie draft | 61 | Jesse Stringer | Port Adelaide (VFL) | | |
| 2010 national draft | 15 | Billie Smedts | Geelong Falcons | | |
| 2010 national draft | 23 | Cameron Guthrie | Calder Cannons | | |
| 2010 national draft | 37 | George Horlin-Smith | Sturt | | |
| 2010 national draft | 54 | Jordan Schroder | Calder Cannons | | |
| 2010 national draft | 58 (RE) | James Podsiadly | Geelong (AFL) | | |
| 2011 pre-season draft | No selections held | | | | |
| 2011 rookie draft | 23 | Josh Walker | Geelong Falcons | | |
| 2011 rookie draft | 40 | George Burbury | Hobart | | |
| 2011 rookie draft | 56 | Jonathan Simpkin | Geelong | | |
| 2011 rookie draft | 71 | Ryan Bathie | | Unregistered player (Basketball) | |
| 2011 national draft | 32 | Joel Hamling | Claremont | | |
| 2011 national draft | 34 | Shane Kersten | South Fremantle | | |
| 2011 national draft | 48 | Jordan Murdoch | Glenelg | | |
| 2011 national draft | 66 | Lincoln McCarthy | Glenelg | | |
| 2011 national draft | 78 | Orren Stephenson | North Ballarat | | |
| 2011 national draft | 86 | Jed Bews^ | Geelong Falcons | Son of Andrew Bews | |
| 2012 pre-season draft | No selections held | | | | |
| 2012 rookie draft | 18 | Cam Eardley | East Fremantle | | |
| 2012 rookie draft | 36 | Jackson Sheringham | Geelong | | |
| 2012 rookie draft | 54 | Mark Blicavs | | Unregistered player (Athletics) | |
| 2012 national draft | 16 | Jackson Thurlow | Launceston | | |
| 2012 national draft | 77 | Brad Hartman | Sturt | | |
| 2012 national draft | 92 (RE) | Jesse Stringer | Geelong (AFL) | | |
| 2013 pre-season draft | No selections held | | | | |
| 2013 rookie draft | No selections held | | | | |
| 2013 national draft | 16 | Darcy Lang | Geelong Falcons | | |
| 2013 national draft | 36 | Jarrad Jansen | East Fremantle | | |
| 2013 national draft | 41 | Jake Kolodjashnij | Launceston | | |
| 2013 national draft | 54 (RE) | Josh Walker | Geelong (AFL) | | |
| 2013 national draft | 63 (RE) | George Burbury | Geelong (AFL) | | |
| 2014 pre-season draft | No selections held | | | | |
| 2014 rookie draft | 15 | James Toohey | Oakleigh Chargers | | |
| 2014 rookie draft | 31 | Nick Bourke | Geelong Falcons | | |
| 2014 rookie draft | 46 | Zac Bates | West Adelaide | | |
| 2014 rookie draft | 56 | Michael Luxford | | 3-year non-registered player | |
| 2014 national draft | 10 | Nakia Cockatoo | NT Thunder | | |
| 2014 national draft | 47 | Cory Gregson | Glenelg | | |
| 2014 national draft | 55 | Dean Gore | Sturt | | |
| 2014 national draft | 59 | Jordan Cunico | Gippsland Power | | |
| 2014 national draft | RE | Mark Blicavs | Geelong (AFL) | | |
| 2015 pre-season draft | No selections held | | | | |
| 2015 rookie draft | 14 | Tom Read | Sturt | | |
| 2015 rookie draft | 32 | Cameron Delaney | North Melbourne | | |
| 2015 rookie draft | 49 | Padraig Lucey | Kerry (GAA) | International player (Gaelic football) | |
| 2015 national draft | 59 | Ryan Gardner | Burnie | | |
| 2015 national draft | 66 | Sam Menegola | Subiaco | | |
| 2015 national draft | 69 | Wylie Buzza | Mount Gravatt | | |
| 2015 national draft | 70 | Matthew Hayball | West Adelaide | | |
| 2015 national draft | RE | Michael Luxford | Geelong (AFL) | | |
| 2016 pre-season draft | Not held (all clubs declined to participate) | | | | |
| 2016 rookie draft | 9 | Jock Cornell | Mangoplah-CUE | | |
| 2016 rookie draft | 27 | James Parsons | Eastern Ranges | | |
| 2016 rookie draft | 44 | Tom Ruggles | Geelong | | |
| 2016 national draft | 26 | Brandan Parfitt | NT Thunder | | |
| 2016 national draft | 40 | Tom Stewart | Geelong (VFL) | | |
| 2016 national draft | 43 | Esava Ratugolea | Murray Bushrangers | | |
| 2016 national draft | 60 | Quinton Narkle | Perth | | |
| 2016 national draft | 68 | Timm House | Geelong (VFL) | | |
| 2016 national draft | 69 | Ryan Abbott | Grovedale | | |
| 2016 national draft | RE | Tom Ruggles | Geelong (AFL) | | |
| 2017 pre-season draft | Not held (all clubs declined to participate) | | | | |
| 2017 rookie draft | 16 | Jack Henry | Geelong Falcons | | |
| 2017 rookie draft | 33 | Zach Guthrie | Calder Cannons | | |
| 2017 rookie draft | 48 | Jamaine Jones | North Ballarat Rebels | | |
| 2017 rookie draft | 53 | Sam Simpson^ | Geelong Falcons | Son of Sean Simpson | |
| 2017 rookie draft | B | Mark O'Connor | Kerry (GAA) | International player (Gaelic football) | |
| 2017 national draft | 22 | Lachie Fogarty | Western Jets | | |
| 2017 national draft | 24 | Tim Kelly | South Fremantle | | |
| 2017 national draft | 36 | Charlie Constable | Sandringham Dragons | | |
| 2017 national draft | 57 | Gryan Miers | Geelong Falcons | | |
| 2017 national draft | RE | James Parsons | Geelong (AFL) | | |
| 2018 pre-season draft | No selections held | | | | |
| 2018 rookie draft | 16 | Stewart Crameri | Western Bulldogs (AFL) | | |
| 2018 rookie draft | 30 | Matthew Hayball^{‡} | Geelong (AFL) | | |
| 2018 national draft | 15 | Jordan Clark | Claremont | | |
| 2018 national draft | 48 | Ben Jarvis | Norwood | | |
| 2018 national draft | 50 | Jacob Kennerley | Norwood | ←Collingwood ←Sydney | |
| 2018 national draft | 65 | Darcy Fort | Central District | ←Sydney | |
| 2018 national draft | 68 | Jake Tarca | South Adelaide | ←Richmond | |
| 2018 national draft | 74 | Oscar Brownless^ | Geelong Falcons | Son of Billy Brownless | |
| 2018 national draft | RE | Jack Henry | Geelong (AFL) | | |
| 2018 national draft | RE | Mark O'Connor | Geelong (AFL) | | |
| 2019 pre-season draft | Not held (all clubs declined to participate) | | | | |
| 2019 rookie draft | 11 | Tom Atkins | Geelong (VFL) | | |
| 2019 rookie draft | B | Stefan Okunbor | Kerry (GAA) | International player (Gaelic football) | |
| 2019 rookie draft | B | Blake Schlensog | Geelong Falcons | Next Generation Academy player | |
| 2019 mid-season rookie draft | No selections held | | | | |
| 2019 national draft | 16 | Cooper Stephens | Geelong Falcons | ←West Coast | |
| 2019 national draft | 19 | Sam De Koning | Dandenong Stingrays | | |
| 2019 national draft | 41 | Francis Evans | Calder Cannons | | |
| 2019 national draft | 50 | Cameron Taheny | Norwood | ←Essendon ←North Melbourne | |
| 2019 national draft | RE | Zach Guthrie | Geelong (AFL) | | |
| 2019 national draft | RE | Sam Simpson | Geelong (AFL) | | |
| 2020 pre-season draft | No selections held | | | | |
| 2020 rookie draft | 14 | Bradley Close | Glenelg | | |
| 2020 rookie draft | 27 | Oscar Brownless^{‡} | Geelong (AFL) | | |
| 2020 rookie draft | 35 | Lachie Henderson^{‡} | Geelong (AFL) | | |
| 2020 national draft | 20 | Max Holmes | Sandringham Dragons | ←Richmond ←St Kilda | |
| 2020 national draft | 33 | Shannon Neale | South Fremantle | ←Gold Coast | |
| 2020 national draft | 47 | Nick Stevens | GWV Rebels | ←Carlton | |
| 2021 pre-season draft | No selections held | | | | |
| 2021 rookie draft | B | Paul Tsapatolis | Keilor Thunder (Big V) | 3-year non-registered player (basketball) | |
| 2021 mid-season rookie draft | No selections held | | | | |
| 2021 national draft | 24 | Toby Conway | Geelong Falcons | ←Fremantle ←Collingwood ←Gold Coast | |
| 2021 national draft | 25 | Mitchell Knevitt | Geelong Falcons | ←Western Bulldogs (draft) ←Adelaide | |
| 2021 national draft | 32 | James Willis | North Adelaide | ←Greater Western Sydney (2020) ←Essendon (2020) | |
| 2021 national draft | 48 | Flynn Kroeger | Eastern Ranges | ←Brisbane Lions ←West Coast (2020) | |
| 2021 national draft | 64 | Cooper Whyte | Geelong Falcons | | |
| 2022 pre-season draft | No selections held | | | | |
| 2022 rookie draft | 15 | Oliver Dempsey | Old Carey Grammarians (VAFA) | | |
| 2022 mid-season rookie draft | 12 | Zane Williams | Woodville-West Torrens | | |
| 2022 national draft | 8 | Jhye Clark | Geelong Falcons | ←Gold Coast | |
| 2022 national draft | 52 | Phoenix Foster | Norwood | | |
| 2022 rookie draft | B | Oisín Mullin | Mayo (GAA) | International player (Gaelic football) | |
| 2022 rookie draft | B | Ted Clohesy | Geelong Falcons | Next Generation Academy selection (born in South Africa) | |
| 2022 rookie draft | 18 | Oscar Murdoch | Geelong Falcons | | |
| 2022 rookie draft | 32 | Osca Riccardi^ | Geelong Falcons | Son of Peter Riccardi | |
| 2023 mid-season rookie draft | 6 | Mitch Hardie | Woodville-West Torrens | | |
| 2023 national draft | 11 | Connor O'Sullivan | Murray Bushrangers | versatile key defnder | |
| 2023 national draft | 32 | Mitch Edwards | South Mandurah(WA) / Peel Thunder (WAFL) | ruck | |
| 2023 national draft | 26 | Shaun Mannagh | Werribee (VFL) | small forward / mid | |
| 2023 national draft | 58 | George Stevens | Greater Western Victoria Rebels | midfielder | |
| 2023 national draft | 61 | Oliver Wiltshire | Barwon Heads FC | small forward | |
| 2023 national draft | 63 | Lawson Humphries | Swan Districts (WAFL) | small defender / running half back (started as pick 94 - the "steak knives" in the Esava Ratugolea trade | |
| 2023 rookie draft | 7 | Emerson Jeka | Box Hill Hawks (VFL) | tall swing man | |
| 2024 national draft | 44 | Jay Polkinghorne | Norwood | medium forward | |
| 2024 national draft | 52 | Jacob Molier | Sturt | fwd/ruck | |
| 2024 national draft | 66 | Lennox Hofmann | Sandringham Dragons | medium defender | |
| 2024 national draft | 69 | Keighton Matofai-Forbes | Western Jets | medium forward | |
| 2024 rookie draft | 12 | Xavier Ivisic | Geelong Falcons | Midfielder-forward (delisted 2025) | |
| 2024 rookie draft | 23 | Patrick Retschko | Oakleigh Chargers | wing (traded to Richmond 2025 for pick 99) | |
| 2024 rookie draft | 31 | Joe Pike | Geelong VFL | over-age ruck | |

=== Trades ===
Geelong's incoming/outgoing trades (Note: Selections received and traded are based on the indicative draft order at the time of the trade; adjustments to the draft order may eventuate due to factors such as compensation picks.)
| Period | Received | Traded with | Traded | Note(s) | Ref. |
|---|---|---|---|---|---|
| 1988 | Ken Hinkley | Geelong | pick 48 | | |
| 1989 | Gary Keane | Fitzroy | pick 27 | | |
| 1989 | Trevor Poole | Richmond | pick 13 pick 41 | | |
| 1989 | pick 113 | Melbourne | Michael Scott | | |
| 1990 | pick 1 | Brisbane Bears | David Cameron; Shane Hamilton | | |
| 1991 | John Barnes | Essendon | pick 37 | | |
| 1991 | Draft pick not utilised | North Melbourne | Tim Bourke | | |
| 1991 | Draft pick not utilised | Essendon | Sean Denham | | |
| 1991 | pick 35 | St Kilda | Darren Flanigan | | |
| 1991 | pick 9 | St Kilda | Adrian Fletcher | | |
| 1991 | Colin Gasden; John McNamara | North Melbourne | pick 50 | | |
| 1991 | Geoff Miles | West Coast | pick 24 | | |
| 1992 | pick 65 | Sydney | Tony Malakellis | | |
| 1992 | Liam Pickering; Darren Steele; Leigh Tudor | North Melbourne | pick 123 | | |
| 1993 | Aaron Lord | Brisbane Bears | pick 45 | | |
| 1993 | pick 38 | Richmond | Mark Neeld | | |
| 1994 | Brenton Sanderson | Collingwood | pick 47 | | |
| 1994 | Brad Sholl pick 17 pick 69 | North Melbourne | Robert Scott | | |
| 1995 | pick 49 | Carlton | Adrian Hickmott | | |
| 1995 | Martin McKinnon | Adelaide | pick 18 | | |
| 1996 | Tim Hargreaves | Hawthorn | Aaron Lord | | |
| 1996 | Cameron Roberts; Hamish Simpson | Port Adelaide | pick 37 | | |
| 1996 | pick 8 (priority) pick 43 | Port Adelaide | Shayne Breuer | | |
| 1997 | Brett Spinks | West Coast | pick 13 | | |
| 1997 | pick 15 pick 38 | Western Bulldogs | Matthew Robbins | | |
| 1998 | pick 8 | Richmond | Craig Biddiscombe | | |
| 1998 | Jason Mooney | Sydney | pick 8 | | |
| 1998 | Scott Bamford; Tristan Lynch pick 17 pick 24 | Brisbane Lions | Martin McKinnon pick 5 | | |
| 1998 | Simon Arnott | Sydney | pick 52 | | |
| 1998 | Tom Harley | Port Adelaide | pick 37 | | |
| 1999 | pick 31 | Carlton | Michael Mansfield | | |
| 1999 | Cameron Mooney | Kangaroos | Leigh Colbert pick 53 | | |
| 2000 | pick 44 | Collingwood | Carl Steinfort | | |
| 2000 | Kent Kingsley | Kangaroos | pick 42 | | |
| 2000 | Justin Murphy | Carlton | pick 11 | | |
| 2000 | Mitchell White | West Coast | pick 27 pick 45 pick 57 | | |
| 2001 | pick 23 | Carlton | Justin Murphy | | |
| 2001 | Brent Grgic | Melbourne | pick 55 | | |
| 2001 | pick 17 pick 41 | Melbourne | Clint Bizzell | | |
| 2002 | Ben Finnin | Adelaide | Ronnie Burns | | |
| 2003 | pick 20 | Western Bulldogs | Peter Street | | |
| 2003 | David Haynes pick #42 | West Coast | pick 20 | | |
| 2003 | —N/a | Carlton | David Clarke | Multi-club trade | |
| 2003 | David Loats | Hawthorn | —N/a | Multi-club trade | |
| 2004 | pick 12 | Melbourne | Brent Moloney | | |
| 2004 | Brad Ottens | Richmond | pick 12 pick 16 | | |
| 2005 | No transactions | | | | |
| 2006 | No transactions | | | | |
| 2007 | pick 44 | Sydney | Henry Playfair | | |
| 2007 | pick 90 | St Kilda | Charlie Gardiner; Steven King | | |
| 2007 | pick 62 | Western Bulldogs | Tim Callan pick 66 | | |
| 2008 | pick 39 | Essendon | Brent Prismall | | |
| 2009 | pick 28 | Sydney | Shane Mumford | | |
| 2009 | pick 40 pick 56 | Port Adelaide | pick 97 | Multi-club trade | |
| 2009 | pick 42 | Essendon | pick 33 | Multi-club trade | |
| 2009 | Marcus Drum | Fremantle | pick 49 | | |
| 2010 | pick 57 | Western Bulldogs | Nathan Djerrkura | | |
| 2010 | pick 36 pick 53 | Carlton | Jeremy Laidler pick 41 | | |
| 2010 | pick 15 | Gold Coast | mid-first round compensation pick | | |
| 2011 | pick 32 pick 34 | Gold Coast | pick 26 | | |
| 2012 | Hamish McIntosh | North Melbourne | pick 38 | | |
| 2012 | Josh Caddy | Gold Coast | first-round compensation pick pick 57 | | |
| 2013 | pick 64 | Adelaide | James Podsiadly | | |
| 2013 | pick 75 | Greater Western Sydney | Josh Hunt | | |
| 2013 | pick 84 | Essendon | Paul Chapman | | |
| 2013 | pick 41 | Brisbane Lions | Trent West | | |
| 2014 | pick 21 | Brisbane Lions | Allen Christensen | | |
| 2014 | Mitch Clark | Melbourne | —N/a | Multi-club trade | |
| 2014 | —N/a | Collingwood | Travis Varcoe | Multi-club trade | |
| 2014 | Rhys Stanley pick 60 | St Kilda | pick 21 | | |
| 2014 | pick 10 pick 47 | Adelaide | pick 14 pick 35 | | |
| 2015 | Patrick Dangerfield pick 50 | Adelaide | Dean Gore pick 9 pick 28 | | |
| 2015 | Lachie Henderson | Carlton | 2016 first round pick (Geelong) | | |
| 2015 | 2016 third round pick (Brisbane Lions) | Brisbane Lions | Jarrad Jansen; Josh Walker | | |
| 2015 | Zac Smith | Gold Coast | pick 49 pick 53 | | |
| 2015 | 2016 fifth round pick (Greater Western Sydney) | Greater Western Sydney | Steve Johnson | | |
| 2016 | pick 63 | Fremantle | Shane Kersten | | |
| 2016 | Zach Tuohy; 2017 second round pick (Carlton) | Carlton | Billie Smedts pick 63; 2017 first round pick (Geelong) | | |
| 2016 | pick 24 pick 64 | Richmond | Josh Caddy pick 56 | | |
| 2016 | pick 72 | West Coast | Nathan Vardy | | |
| 2016 | Aaron Black | North Melbourne | pick 92 | | |
| 2017 | 2018 third round pick (Richmond) | Richmond | pick 53 | | |
| 2017 | pick 58; 2018 fourth round pick (Carlton) | Carlton | Darcy Lang; 2018 fourth round pick (Geelong) | | |
| 2017 | Gary Ablett pick 24; 2018 fourth round pick (Gold Coast) | Gold Coast | pick 19; 2018 second round pick (Geelong) | | |
| 2018 | pick 43 pick 62 | Brisbane Lions | Lincoln McCarthy pick 55 pick 59 | | |
| 2018 | Nathan Kreuger | Carlton | pick 43 | Pre-draft selection | |
| 2018 | Gary Rohan | Sydney | pick 62 | | |
| 2018 | pick 59 | Gold Coast | George Horlin-Smith | | |
| 2018 | pick 70 | Sydney | Jackson Thurlow | | |
| 2018 | pick 51 | Collingwood | pick 59 pick 60 | | |
| 2018 | pick 68 | Richmond | 2019 fourth round pick (Geelong) | Live trade during draft | |
| 2019 | pick 14 pick 24; 2020 first round pick (West Coast) | West Coast | Tim Kelly; 2020 third round pick (Geelong) | Multi-club trade | |
| 2019 | pick 37 | Essendon | pick 57 | Multi-club trade | |
| 2019 | pick 58 | Gold Coast | Zac Smith | | |
| 2019 | Jack Steven | St Kilda | pick 58 | | |
| 2019 | Josh Jenkins; 2020 third round pick (Gold Coast) | Adelaide | pick 37 | | |
| 2019 | pick 64; 2020 first round priority pick (Gold Coast) | Gold Coast | pick 27 | Live trade during draft | |
| 2019 | pick 50 | Essendon | pick 63; 2020 third round pick (Gold Coast); 2020 fourth round pick (Geelong) | Live trade during draft | |
| 2020 | pick 30 pick 38 | Carlton | Lachie Fogarty | | |
| 2020 | 2021 third round pick (Melbourne) | Brisbane Lions | Nakia Cockatoo | | |
| 2020 | Jeremy Cameron; 2021 second round pick (Greater Western Sydney); 2021 second round pick (Essendon) | Greater Western Sydney | pick 13 pick 15 pick 20; 2021 fourth round pick (Geelong) | | |
| 2020 | pick 27 | Gold Coast | 2021 third round pick (Melbourne) | | |
| 2020 | pick 20 | Richmond | 2021 first round pick (Geelong) | Live trade during draft | |
| 2021 | pick 41 | Collingwood | Nathan Kreuger pick 55 | | |
| 2021 | pick 50; 2022 third round pick (Brisbane Lions) | Brisbane Lions | Darcy Fort pick 41 | | |
| 2021 | Jonathon Ceglar; 2022 fourth round pick (Hawthorn) | Hawthorn | pick 50; 2022 third round pick (Brisbane Lions) | | |
| 2021 | pick 22; 2022 third round pick (Carlton) | Fremantle | Jordan Clark; 2022 fourth round pick (Geelong) | | |
| 2021 | pick 23 | Western Bulldogs | pick 32 pick 34 | Live trade during draft | |
| 2021 | pick 47; 2022 third round pick (Brisbane Lions) | Collingwood | pick 45 | Live trade during draft | |
| 2022 | Tanner Bruhn | Greater Western Sydney | pick 18 | | |
| 2022 | pick 25 | Brisbane Lions | pick 38 pick 48 pick 55; 2023 second round pick (Geelong); 2023 fourth round pick (Geelong) | | |
| 2022 | Jack Bowes pick 7 | Gold Coast | 2023 third round pick (Geelong) | | |
| 2022 | Oliver Henry | Collingwood | pick 25 | Multi-club trade | |
| 2022 | —N/a | Hawthorn | Cooper Stephens | Multi-club trade | |
| 2023 | Picks 25, 76 & 94 | Port Adelaide | Esava Ratugolea | Famously, pick 94 was used for Lawson Humphries. | |
| 2024 | Bailey Smith, pick 45 | Western Bulldogs | Picks 17, 38 | Multi club trade StKilda (Jack Macrae) and Carlton (Matt Kennedy) | |

=== Free agency ===
Since free agency was introduced at the conclusion of the 2012 season, Geelong has seen players both arrive and depart the club via free agency.

Geelong's incoming/outgoing free agency transactions
| Period | Player | Status | Free agent type | Notes | Ref |
|---|---|---|---|---|---|
| 2012 | Shannon Byrnes | Outgoing | Unrestricted | Signed with Melbourne; no compensation. | |
| 2012 | Jared Rivers | Incoming | Unrestricted | Previously with Melbourne | |
| 2012 | Jonathan Simpkin | Outgoing | Delisted | Signed with Hawthorn; no compensation. | |
| 2012 | Tom Gillies | Outgoing | Delisted | Signed with Melbourne; no compensation. | |
| 2013 | No transactions | | | | |
| 2014 | Taylor Hunt | Outgoing | Delisted | Signed with Richmond; no compensation. | |
| 2014 | Joel Hamling | Outgoing | Delisted | Signed with Western Bulldogs; no compensation. | |
| 2014 | Sam Blease | Incoming | Delisted | Previously with Melbourne | |
| 2015 | Scott Selwood | Incoming | Restricted | Previously with West Coast | |
| 2015 | Dawson Simpson | Outgoing | Unrestricted | Signed with Greater Western Sydney; no compensation. | |
| 2016 | No transactions | | | | |
| 2017 | Steven Motlop | Outgoing | Restricted | Signed with Port Adelaide; received end of first round draft selection as compensation. | |
| 2018 | Luke Dahlhaus | Incoming | Unrestricted | Previously with Western Bulldogs | |
| 2018 | Daniel Menzel | Outgoing | Delisted | Signed with Sydney; no compensation. | |
| 2018 | Jordan Murdoch | Outgoing | Delisted | Signed with Gold Coast; no compensation. | |
| 2019 | Ryan Abbott | Outgoing | Delisted | Signed with St Kilda; no compensation. | |
| 2019 | Wylie Buzza | Outgoing | Delisted | Signed with Port Adelaide; no compensation. | |
| 2020 | Isaac Smith | Incoming | Unrestricted | Previously with Hawthorn | |
| 2021 | Tyson Stengle | Incoming | Delisted | Previously with Woodville-West Torrens (SANFL)^{[a]} | |
| 2022 | Francis Evans | Outgoing | Delisted | Signed with Port Adelaide; no compensation. | |

- ^{a} Tyson Stengle was delisted by Adelaide during the 2021 pre-season

== AFL Women's ==
=== Draft selections ===
Table key
| ^ | Father–daughter selection | RS | Rookie signing | ^{‡} | Re-drafted player after delisting |
| ^{+} | Compensation pick | ← | Selection was traded from another club (Note: e.g. ←Essendon ←North Melbourne (selection originally held by Essendon, who traded it to North Melbourne, who on-traded it to Geelong)) |

Table of selections, with players' original clubs
| Draft | Pick | Player | Recruited from | Note(s) | Ref. |
|---|---|---|---|---|---|
| 2018 draft | 1^{+} | Nina Morrison | Geelong Falcons | Recruiting compensation pick | |
| 2018 draft | 2^{+} | Sophie Van De Heuvel | GWV Rebels | Recruiting compensation pick | |
| 2018 draft | 7 | Rebecca Webster | Murray Bushrangers | ←Greater Western Sydney | |
| 2018 draft | 14^{+} | Olivia Purcell | Geelong Falcons | Recruiting compensation pick | |
| 2018 draft | 20 | Denby Taylor | Geelong Falcons | ←Greater Western Sydney | |
| 2018 draft | 24 | Georgia Clarke | GWV Rebels | | |
| 2018 draft | 35 | Rene Caris | GWV Rebels | | |
| 2018 draft | 47 | Maighan Fogas | Geelong (VFLW) | | |
| 2018 draft | 57 | Elise Coventry | Geelong (VFLW) | | |
| 2018 draft | 62 | Madeline Keryk | Geelong (VFLW) | | |
| 2019 draft | 11 | Millie Brown^ | Murray Bushrangers | Daughter of Paul Brown | |
| 2019 draft | 34 | Gemma Wright | Carlton (VFLW) | | |
| 2019 draft | 50 | Nicole Garner | Casey Demons (VFLW) | | |
| 2019 draft | 65 | Mia Skinner | Geelong Falcons | | |
| 2019 draft | 80 | Amy McDonald | Geelong (VFLW) | | |
| 2019 draft | 98 | Madisen Maguire | Geelong Falcons | | |
| 2020 draft | 10 | Darcy Moloney | Geelong Falcons | ←Melbourne←Collingwood | |
| 2020 draft | 20 | Laura Gardiner | Geelong Falcons | ←Adelaide | |
| 2020 draft | 21 | Olivia Barber | Murray Bushrangers | | |
| 2020 draft | 27 | Stephanie Williams | Geelong Falcons | ←Melbourne | |
| 2020 draft | 39 | Carly Remmos | Geelong Falcons | | |
| 2021 draft | 2 | Georgie Prespakis | Calder Cannons | | |
| 2021 draft | 7 | Zali Friswell | Calder Cannons | | |
| 2021 draft | 9 | Gabbi Featherston | Geelong Falcons | | |
| 2021 draft | 15 | Annabel Johnson | Geelong VFLW | ←Melbourne | |
| 2022 draft | 33 | Mia Skinner | Geelong VFLW | ←Collingwood←Richmond←Hawthorn | |
| 2022 draft | 42 | Brooke Plummer | Northern Knights | ←Carlton←Melbourne | |
| 2022 draft | 55 | Abbey McDonald | Calder Cannons | ←Western Bulldogs | |
| 2023 supplementary draft | 1 | Erin Hoare | Geelong VFLW | ←Sydney | |
| 2023 rookie signings | RS | Anna-Rose Kennedy | Tipperary GAA | | |
| 2023 rookie signings | RS | Aishling Moloney | Tipperary GAA | | |

=== Trades ===
Geelong's incoming and outgoing trades (Note: Selections received and traded are based on the indicative draft order at the time of the trade; adjustments to the draft order may eventuate due to factors such as compensation picks.)
| Period | Received | Traded with | Traded | Note(s) | Ref. |
|---|---|---|---|---|---|
| 2018 | pick 7 pick 20 | Greater Western Sydney | pick 11 | Multi-club trade | |
| 2018 | —N/a | Collingwood | pick 15 | Multi-club trade | |
| 2019 | No transactions | | | | |
| 2020 | pick 10 pick 20 pick 27 pick 39 | Melbourne | pick 5 pick 35 pick 49 | | |
| 2021 | Chantel Emonson pick 15 | Melbourne | Olivia Purcell pick 37 | | |
| 2021 | Chloe Scheer | Adelaide | pick 20 | | |
| 2022 | Ingrid Houtsma | Richmond | Stephanie Williams | | |
| 2022 | Jacqueline Parry; Shelley Scott | Melbourne | Jordan Ivey pick 51 | | |
| 2022 | pick 21 pick 42 | Carlton | Phoebe McWilliams pick 17 | | |
| 2022 | pick 33 | Collingwood | Olivia Barber | | |
| 2022 | pick 24 pick 56 | Western Bulldogs | Millie Brown pick 21 | | |
| 2022 | Mikayla Bowen | West Coast | pick 24 | | |
| 2023 | Kate Surman | Port Adelaide | Maddy Keryk pick 12 | | |
| 2023 | pick 1 | Sydney | Laura Gardiner | | |

=== Free agency and expansion signings ===
Geelong's incoming and outgoing free agency transactions
| Period | Player | Status | Free agent type | Notes | Ref |
|---|---|---|---|---|---|
| 2018 expansion club signing period | Richelle Cranston | Incoming | Expansion signing | Previously with Melbourne | |
| 2018 expansion club signing period | Melissa Hickey | Incoming | Expansion signing | Previously with Melbourne | |
| 2018 expansion club signing period | Erin Hoare | Incoming | Expansion signing | Previously with Melbourne | |
| 2018 expansion club signing period | Anna Teague | Incoming | Expansion signing | Previously with Melbourne | |
| 2018 expansion club signing period | Cassie Blakeway | Incoming | Expansion signing | Signed from Geelong's VFLW team | |
| 2018 expansion club signing period | Kate Darby | Incoming | Expansion signing | Signed from Geelong's VFLW team | |
| 2018 expansion club signing period | Renee Garing | Incoming | Expansion signing | Signed from Geelong's VFLW team | |
| 2018 expansion club signing period | Rebecca Goring | Incoming | Expansion signing | Signed from Geelong's VFLW team | |
| 2018 expansion club signing period | Jordan Ivey | Incoming | Expansion signing | Signed from Geelong's VFLW team | |
| 2018 expansion club signing period | Danielle Orr | Incoming | Expansion signing | Signed from Geelong's VFLW team | |
| 2018 expansion club signing period | Aasta O'Connor | Incoming | Expansion signing | Previously with Western Bulldogs | |
| 2018 expansion club signing period | Maddie Boyd | Incoming | Expansion signing | Previously with Greater Western Sydney | |
| 2018 expansion club signing period | Phoebe McWilliams | Incoming | Expansion signing | Previously with Greater Western Sydney | |
| 2018 free agency | No transactions | | | | |
| 2019 free agency | Hannah Burchell | Outgoing | Delisted | Signed with Richmond; no compensation. | |
| 2019 free agency | Mia-Rae Clifford | Outgoing | Delisted | Signed with Fremantle; no compensation. | |
| 2020 free agency | No transactions | | | | |
| 2021 special assistance | Olivia Fuller | Incoming | Mature age signing | Signed from Geelong's VFLW team | |
| 2021 special assistance | Claudia Gunjaca | Incoming | Mature age signing | Signed from Geelong's VFLW team | |
| 2021 free agency | Richelle Cranston | Outgoing | Delisted | Signed with Western Bulldogs; no compensation. | |
| 2021 free agency | Rachel Kearns | Incoming | Rookie list signing | Signed from Gaelic football | |
| 2022 free agency | Samantha Gooden | Incoming | Rookie list signing | Signed from netball | |

== See also ==
- List of Geelong Football Club players
