= 2008 Geelong Football Club season =

Geelong Football Club
2008 season
- President: Frank Costa
- Coach: Mark Thompson (9th season)
- Captains: Tom Harley (2nd season)
- Home ground: Skilled Stadium
- Pre-season competition: Quarter final
- AFL season: 1st
- Finals series: Runner-up
- Best and Fairest: Joel Corey
- Leading goalkicker: Steve Johnson (50)

The 2008 Geelong Football Club season was the club's 109th season in the Australian Football League (AFL). Geelong finished the regular season in first position on the ladder, earning the club a second-consecutive McClelland Trophy, and its ninth overall. Geelong's regular season record was impressive (21 wins, 1 loss), the best performance of a team in the home-and-away season since Essendon Football Club in 2000. Geelong then went on to win its Qualifying and Preliminary finals in succession, earning a place in the 2008 AFL Grand Final against Hawthorn, and the chance for a second-consecutive premiership. However, Geelong failed to capitalise on its outstanding performance during the season, losing the premiership in a Grand Final thriller.

Geelong signed up a club record 36,850 club members for the season, and had an average home crowd attendance of 43,176, also a club record.

== Season overview ==
Geelong did well in the home and away season and finished four games and percentage clear on top of the ladder. It was an outstanding season with the team winning 21 out of the 22 games & finished with a percentage of 161.84, the only loss was to Collingwood in round 9 by a massive 86 points. With the team widely considered to be premiership favorites the Cats were almost unbackable favourites to win the 2008 AFL premiership. They beat St Kilda in the first qualifying final 17.17(119) to 8.13(61). A 29-point win over the Western Bulldogs in the preliminary final secured the Cats a grand final a berth against Hawthorn.

Geelong were defeated in the 2008 AFL Grand Final by Hawthorn in front of an attendance of 100,012 people. Despite having numerous chances in the first half of the game, and dominating through the midfield, the Cats failed to convert and were defeated by the Hawks.

== Captains ==
- Captain: Tom Harley
- Vice-captain: Cameron Ling
- Deputy vice-captain: Cameron Mooney

== Club List ==
=== Player List ===
Name	No.	Height (cm)	Weight (kg)	Birthdate	Debut	Games			Goals
Name	No.	Height (cm)	Weight (kg)	Birthdate	Debut	2008	Total	Club	2008	Total
Ablett, Gary	29	182	88	14 May 1984	2002	19	144	144	24	189
Ablett, Nathan	23	196	98	13 December 1985	2005	0	32	32	0	46
Bartel, Jimmy	3	187	88	4 December 1983	2002	23	131	131	21	83
Blake, Mark	24	200	101	9 September 1985	2005	23	56	56	6	8
Byrnes, Shannon	17	175	77	7 April 1984	2004	9	54	54	8	27
Chapman, Paul	35	179	88	5 November 1981	2000	18	154	154	32	203
Corey, Joel	11	191	88	17 February 1982	2000	23	174	174	6	54
Davenport, Jason	1	185	82	4 September 1985	****	0	0	0	0	0
Djerrkura, Nathan	18	176	80	19 September 1988	****	0	0	0	0	0
Djerrkura, Nathan	18	176	80	19 September 1988	****	0	0	0	0	0
Donohue, Adam	25	182	83	22 February 1990	****	0	0	0	0	0
Egan, Matthew	19	196	101	10 July 1983	2005	0	59	59	0	1
Enright, Corey	44	187	91	14 September 1981	2001	23	148	148	6	45
Gamble, Ryan	15	184	80	23 September 1987	2006	13	14	14	21	21
Harley, Tom	2	193	95	18 July 1978	1998	23	182	181	0	10
Hawkins, Tom	26	197	103	27 July 1988	2007	10	19	19	13	25
Hogan, Simon	34	182	75	16 August 1988	****	0	0	0	0	0
Hunt, Josh	8	185	100	14 March 1982	2001	21	120	120	3	16
Johnson, David	28	181	84	28 October 1981	2002	1	71	71	0	16
Johnson, Steve	20	189	88	4 July 1983	2002	23	110	110	50	207
Kelly, James	9	183	85	29 December 1983	2002	19	127	127	8	61
Ling, Cameron	45	189	94	27 February 1981	2000	21	180	180	15	106
Lonergan, Tom	13	197	99	17 May 1984	2005	14	21	21	33	39
Mackie, Andrew	4	192	85	7 August 1984	2004	19	80	80	11	52
McKenna, Dan	31	195	85	29 June 1989	****	0	0	0	0	0
Milburn, Darren	39	189	92	15 April 1977	1997	20	233	233	6	86
Mooney, Cameron	21	195	99	26 September 1979	1999	22	166	155	49	203
Ottens, Brad	6	202	108	25 January 1980	1998	14	202	73	13	235
Prismall, Brent	32	186	88	14 July 1986	2006	12	25	25	8	15
Rooke, Max	33	189	93	19 December 1981	2002	18	110	110	9	30
Scarlett, Matthew	30	192	95	5 June 1979	1998	20	204	204	0	16
Selwood, Joel	14	182	83	26 May 1988	2007	22	43	43	6	13
Simpson, Dawson	16	206	105	17 February 1989	****	0	0	0	0	0
Simpson, Scott	22	196	92	19 October 1989	****	0	0	0	0	0
Stokes, Mathew	27	177	80	22 November 1984	2006	20	50	50	37	78
Taylor, Harry	7	193	91	12 June 1986	2008	19	19	19	3	3
Tenace, Kane	10	182	86	4 July 1985	2004	1	54	54	0	11
Varcoe, Travis	5	180	78	10 April 1988	2007	14	32	32	13	28
West, Trent	12	198	103	17 October 1987	2008	6	6	6	1	1
Wojcinski, David	40	180	80	18 September 1980	1999	13	131	131	7	44
Statistics are to end of Qualifying Final, 2008 Season (7 September 2008)

=== Rookie List ===
Name	No.	Height	Weight	Birthdate	Debut	Games			Goals
Name	No.	Height	Weight	Birthdate	Debut	2008	Total	Club	2008	Total
Bedford, Liam	42	180	73	12 July 1988	****	0	0	0	0	0
Kangars, Chris	38	193	95	1 August 1989	****	0	0	0	0	0
Laidler, Jeremy	37	189	80	5 August 1989	****	0	0	0	0	0
Moles, Brodie	36	183	84	7 November 1985	****	0	0	0	0	0
Mumford, Shane*	41	200	102	5 July 1986	2008	3	3	3	0	0
* Nominated Rookie – Elevated to senior list during season, eligible for senior selection Statistics are to end of 2008 Season (27 September 2008)

=== Changes from 2007 List ===
==== Additions ====
- Exchange period – received:
  - None
- Rookie elevation:
1. Tom Lonergan
2. Jason Davenport
- Father/son selection:
1. Adam Donohue
- NAB AFL Draft (24 November 2007):
1. Harry Taylor (Round 1; Overall pick 17; from East Fremantle)
2. Dawson Simpson (Round 2; Overall pick 34; from Murray Bushrangers)
3. Scott Simpson (Round 3; Overall pick 44; from Dandenong Stingrays)
4. Dan McKenna (Round 3; Overall pick 50; from Gippsland Power)
5. Adam Donohue (Round 4; Overall pick 60; from Geelong Falcons)
- NAB AFL Pre-Season Draft (11 December 2007):
  - None
- NAB AFL Rookie Draft (11 December 2007):
1. Brodie Moles (Round 1; Overall pick 16; from Tasmania)
2. Jeremy Laidler (Round 2; Overall pick 32; from Calder U18)
3. Chris Kangars (Round 3; Overall pick 46; from Geelong U18)
4. Shane Mumford (Round 4; Overall pick 57; from Geelong VFL)

==== Deletions ====
- Exchange period – traded:
1. Tim Callan and Round 4 draft selection (No.66) – to Western Bulldogs (received Western Bulldogs' Round 4 draft selection – No.62)
2. Henry Playfair – to Sydney (received Sydney's Round 3 draft selection – No.44)
3. Steven King and Charlie Gardiner – St Kilda (received St Kilda's Round 6 draft selection – No.90)
- Delisted:
1. Joel Reynolds
2. Matthew Spencer
3. Sam Hunt
4. Stephen Owen
5. Todd Grima
- Retirements:
  - None

== Games ==
=== NAB Cup ===
Date and Local Time	Opponent	Home or Away	Venue	Scores
Date and Local Time	Opponent	Home or Away	Venue	Result	Home	Away
First Round
Saturday, 16 February – 3:40 pm	Melbourne	Home	Skilled Stadium	Won by 71	2.22.10 (160)	2.11.5 (89)
Quarter Finals (Eliminated)
Saturday, 23 February – 3:40 pm	St Kilda	Away	Manuka Oval	Lost by 5	3.9.10 (91)	3.8.11 (86)

=== Premiership season ===
Round	Date and Local Time	Opponent	Home or Away	Venue	Scores			Ladder Pos'n
Round	Date and Local Time	Opponent	Home or Away	Venue	Result	Home	Away	Ladder Pos'n
1	Thursday, 20 March – 8:15 pm	Port Adelaide	Away	AAMI Stadium	Won by 9	14.12 (96)	15.15 (105)	6
2	Sunday, 30 March – 2:10 pm	Essendon	Home	Telstra Dome	Won by 99	22.18 (150)	6.15 (51)	2
3	Sunday, 6 April – 1:10 pm	Melbourne	Home	Skilled Stadium	Won by 30	16.16 (112)	12.10 (82)	1
4	Saturday, 12 April – 2:10 pm	St Kilda	Away	Telstra Dome	Won by 42	13.16 (94)	21.10 (136)	1
5	Saturday, 19 April – 2:10 pm	Sydney	Home	Skilled Stadium	Won by 42	16.18 (114)	10.12 (72)	1
6	Friday, 25 April – 6:40 pm	Fremantle	Away	Subiaco	Won by 1	13.10 (88)	13.11 (89)	1
7	Saturday, 3 May – 2:10 pm	Brisbane Lions	Home	Skilled Stadium	Won by 27	15.15 (105)	11.12 (78)	1
8	Saturday, 17 May – 2:10 pm	Richmond	Away	MCG	Won by 30	10.9 (69)	14.15 (99)	1
9	Friday, 23 May – 7:40 pm	Collingwood	Away	MCG	Lost by 86	20.14 (134)	7.6 (48)	2
10	Saturday, 31 May – 7:10 pm	Carlton	Home	Telstra Dome	Won by 55	19.19 (133)	12.5 (77)	2
11	Friday, 6 June – 7:40 pm	Kangaroos	Away	Telstra Dome	Won by 13	17.12 (114)	19.13 (127)	2
12	Sunday, 15 June – 1:10 pm	Port Adelaide	Home	Skilled Stadium	Won by 59	15.18 (108)	7.7 (49)	1
13	Saturday, 21 June – 5:40 pm	West Coast	Away	Subiaco	Won by 135	5.17 (47)	28.14 (182)	1
14	Friday, 4 July – 7:40 pm	Adelaide	Away	AAMI Stadium	Won by 68	8.8 (56)	18.16 (124)	1
15	Saturday, 12 July – 2:10 pm	Fremantle	Home	Skilled Stadium	Won by 74	18.10 (118)	6.8 (44)	1
16	Saturday, 19 July – 2:10 pm	Western Bulldogs	Home	Skilled Stadium	Won by 61	19.17 (131)	10.10 (70)	1
17	Friday, 25 July – 7:40 pm	Hawthorn	Away	MCG	Won by 11	11.11 (77)	12.16 (88)	1
18	Saturday, 2 August – 7:10 pm	Richmond	Home	Telstra Dome	Won by 63	20.14 (134)	10.11 (71)	1
19	Friday, 8 August – 7:10 pm	Melbourne	Away	MCG	Won by 116	5.11 (41)	24.13 (157)	1
20	Saturday, 16 August – 7:10 pm	Sydney	Away	ANZ Stadium	Won by 39	14.10 (94)	20.13 (133)	1
21	Sunday, 24 August – 1:10 pm	Kangaroos	Home	Skilled Stadium	Won by 33	17.13 (115)	13.4 (82)	1
22	Saturday, 30 August – 2:10 pm	West Coast	Home	Skilled Stadium	Won by 99	24.20 (164)	10.5 (65)	1

=== Finals ===
Date and Local Time	Opponent	Home or Away	Venue	Scores
Date and Local Time	Opponent	Home or Away	Venue	Result	Home	Away
Qualifying and Elimination Finals
Sunday, 7 September – 2:40 pm	St Kilda	Home	MCG	Won by 58	17.17 (119)	8.13 (61)
Preliminary Final
Friday, 19 September – 7:40 pm	Western Bulldogs	Home	MCG	Won by 29	12.11 (83)	7.12 (54)
Grand Final
Saturday, 27 September – 2:30 pm	Hawthorn	Home	MCG	Lost by 26	11.23 (89)	18.7 (115)

== See also ==
- 2008 AFL season
- Geelong Football Club
