= 2010 Geelong Football Club season =

Geelong Football Club
2010 season
- President: Frank Costa
- Coach: Mark Thompson (11th season)
- Captains: Cameron Ling (1st season)
- Home ground: Skilled Stadium
- Pre-season competition: First round
- AFL season: 2nd
- Finals series: Preliminary finals
- Best and Fairest: Joel Selwood
- Leading goalkicker: Steve Johnson (63)
- Highest home attendance: 84,401 vs. Collingwood (7 August 2010)
- Lowest home attendance: 24,099 vs. West Coast (28 August 2010)
- Average home attendance: 41,475
- Club membership: 40,655 (▲3,495 / +9.41%)

The 2010 Geelong Football Club season was the club's 111th season in the Australian Football League (AFL). Geelong finished the regular season in second position on the ladder, with 17 wins and five losses. Geelong then went on to lose its Preliminary final against Collingwood. As a result, Geelong failed to advance to the Grand Final for the first time in four seasons, as well as failing to defend its 2009 premiership.

Geelong signed up a club record of 40,655 members for the season, and had an average home crowd attendance of 41,475.

== Club list ==
=== Changes from 2009 list ===
==== Additions ====
- Exchange period (received):
  - Marcus Drum – from Fremantle (exchanged third-round draft selection: overall pick 49)
- Promoted rookie:
1. Jeremy Laidler
- Father/son selection:
  - None
- 2009 AFL draft (26 November 2009):
1. Daniel Menzel (Round 1; Overall pick 17; from Central District)
2. Mitch Duncan (Round 2; Overall pick 28; from East Perth)
3. Allen Christensen (Round 3; Overall pick 40; from Geelong Falcons)
4. Nathan Vardy (Round 3; Overall pick 42; from Gippsland Power)
5. Josh Cowan (Round 4; Overall pick 56; from North Ballarat Rebels)
- 2010 Pre-season Draft (15 December 2009):
  - None
- 2010 Rookie Draft (15 December 2009):
1. Jack Weston (Round 1; Overall pick 21; from Gippsland Power)
2. Ben Johnson (Round 2; Overall pick 37; from Geelong (VFL))
3. James Podsiadly (Round 3; Overall pick 50; from Geelong (VFL))
4. Jesse Stringer (Round 4; Overall pick 61; from Port Adelaide Magpies)

==== Deletions ====
- Exchange period (traded):
  - Shane Mumford – to Sydney (received Sydney's second-round draft selection: overall pick 28)
- Delisted:
  - Adam Donohue
  - Dan McKenna
  - Brodie Moles (from Rookie list)
  - Scott Simpson
  - Kane Tenace
  - Bryn Weadon (from Rookie list)
- Retirements:
  - Matthew Egan
  - Tom Harley
  - David Johnson

=== Senior list ===
Players are listed in alphabetical order by surname, and 2010 statistics are for AFL regular season and finals series matches during the 2010 AFL season only. Career statistics include a player's complete AFL career, which, as a result, means that a player's debut and part or whole of their career statistics may be for another club. Statistics are correct to the end of the 2010 season.

Name	No.	AFL debut	Games (2010)	Games (AFL career)	Goals (2010)	Goals (AFL career)
Gary Ablett, Jr.	29	2002	24	192	44	262
Jimmy Bartel	3	2002	24	181	14	110
Mark Blake	24	2005	20	99	1	12
Mitch Brown	1		0	0	0	0
Shannon Byrnes	17	2004	23	99	35	94
Paul Chapman	35	2000	24	199	23	264
Allen Christensen	28		0	0	0	0
Joel Corey	11	2000	14	213	2	63
Josh Cowan	41		0	0	0	0
Nathan Djerrkura	18	2009	1	4	0	0
Marcus Drum	23	2006	0	22	0	6
Mitch Duncan	22	2010	8	8	8	8
Corey Enright	44	2001	24	199	1	50
Ryan Gamble	15	2006	2	24	0	31
Tom Gillies	25	2009	0	6	0	6
Tom Hawkins	26	2007	18	61	21	80
Simon Hogan	34	2009	11	21	3	10
Josh Hunt	8	2001	24	146	1	17
Taylor Hunt	38	2010	7	7	1	1
Steve Johnson	20	2002	22	152	63	313
James Kelly	9	2002	23	170	7	70
Jeremy Laidler	37	2009	1	2	0	0
Cameron Ling	45	2000	21	225	9	122
Tom Lonergan	13	2005	22	54	0	44
Andrew Mackie	4	2004	22	128	4	64
Daniel Menzel	10	2010	3	3	4	4
Darren Milburn	39	1997	22	278	1	91
Cameron Mooney	21	1999	21	213	36	288
Steven Motlop	32	2010	1	1	0	0
Brad Ottens	6	1998	15	225	8	246
Max Rooke	33	2002	1	135	0	58
Matthew Scarlett	30	1998	18	246	0	16
Joel Selwood	14	2007	24	94	9	33
Dawson Simpson	16	2010	2	2	0	0
Mathew Stokes	27	2006	18	89	28	136
Harry Taylor	7	2008	23	66	2	8
Travis Varcoe	5	2007	20	76	31	82
Nathan Vardy	36		0	0	0	0
Trent West	12	2008	4	11	2	3
David Wojcinski	40	1999	24	177	6	54

=== Rookie list ===
Players are listed in alphabetical order by surname, and 2010 statistics are for AFL regular season and finals series matches during the 2010 AFL season only. Career statistics include a player's complete AFL career, which, as a result, means that a player's debut and part or whole of their career statistics may be for another club. Statistics are correct to the end of the 2010 season.

Name	No.	Debut	Games (2010)	Games (AFL career)	Goals (2010)	Goals (AFL career)
Tom Allwright	48	—	—	—	—	—
Ranga Ediriwickrama	42	—	—	—	—	—
Ben Johnson	47	—	—	—	—	—
James Podsiadly*	31	2010	19	19	49	49
Jesse Stringer	49	—	—	—	—	—
Adam Varcoe	46	—	—	—	—	—
Jack Weston	43	—	—	—	—	—

- * Nominated rookie (Elevated to senior list during season, eligible for senior selection)

== Season summary ==
=== Pre-season matches ===
==== NAB Cup ====
**Round**	**Date and local time**	**Opponent**	**Scores** (Geelong's scores indicated in **bold**)			**Venue**	**Attendance**
**Round**	**Date and local time**	**Opponent**	Home	Away	Result	**Venue**	**Attendance**
1	Sunday, 21 February (4:40 pm)	North Melbourne	**2.10.3 (81)**	2.11.11 (95)	Lost by 14 points	Telstra Dome **[H]**	12,989
Eliminated from NAB Cup

==== NAB Challenge ====
**Round**	**Date and local time**	**Opponent**	**Scores** (Geelong's scores indicated in **bold**)			**Venue**	**Attendance**
**Round**	**Date and local time**	**Opponent**	Home	Away	Result	**Venue**	**Attendance**
1	Saturday, 27 February (4:00 pm)	Richmond	**7.9 (51)**	15.12 (102)	Lost by 51 points	Yea Recreation Reserve **[H]**	6,000 (approx.)
2	Saturday, 6 March (3:00 pm)	Brisbane Lions	Match cancelled			Visy Park **[A]**	—N/a
3	Saturday, 13 March (4:30 pm)	Fremantle	10.5 (65)	**14.12 (96)**	Won by 31 points	Fremantle Oval **[A]**	10,000 (approx.)

=== Regular season ===
**Round**	**Date and local time**	**Opponent**	**Scores** (Geelong's scores indicated in **bold**)			**Venue**	**Attendance**	**Ladder** **position**
**Round**	**Date and local time**	**Opponent**	Home	Away	Result	**Venue**	**Attendance**	**Ladder** **position**
1	Friday, 26 March (7:40 pm)	Essendon	**19.11 (125)**	13.16 (94)	Won by 31 points	MCG **[H]**	57,772	6
2	Monday, 5 April (2:10 pm)	Hawthorn	13.13 (91)	**14.16 (100)**	Won 9 points	MCG **[A]**	68,628	4
3	Sunday, 11 April (2:40 pm)	Fremantle	18.17 (125)	**17.16 (118)**	Lost by 7 points	Subiaco Oval **[A]**	38,762	6
4	Sunday, 18 April (2:10 pm)	Port Adelaide	**23.21 (159)**	10.4 (64)	Won by 95 points	Skilled Stadium **[H]**	25,579	4
5	Monday, 26 April (2:10 pm)	Carlton	15.14 (104)	**9.14 (68)**	Lost by 36 points	MCG **[A]**	71,399	7
6	Sunday, 2 May (1:10 pm)	Richmond	**24.17 (161)**	7.11 (53)	Won by 108 points	Skilled Stadium **[H]**	24,106	5
7	Sunday, 9 May (1:10 pm)	Sydney	**19.12 (126)**	9.5 (59)	Won by 67 points	Skilled Stadium **[H]**	25,970	3
8	Saturday, 15 May (7:10 pm)	Brisbane Lions	10.14 (74)	**24.11 (155)**	Won by 81 points	The Gabba **[A]**	33,629	2
9	Friday, 21 May (7:40 pm)	Collingwood	6.14 (50)	**12.14 (86)**	Won by 36 points	MCG **[A]**	88,115	1
10	Saturday, 29 May (2:10 pm)	Melbourne	**18.13 (121)**	10.7 (67)	Won by 54 points	Skilled Stadium **[H]**	24,525	1
11	Saturday, 5 June (5:40 pm)	West Coast	14.14 (98)	**18.14 (122)**	Won by 24 points	Subiaco Oval **[A]**	33,784	1
12	Saturday, 12 June (7:10 pm)	Essendon	12.11 (83)	**23.16 (154)**	Won by 71 points	Etihad Stadium **[A]**	46,358	1
13	Friday, 25 June (7:40 pm)	St Kilda	10.10 (70)	**6.10 (46)**	Lost by 24 points	MCG **[A]**	58,208	1
14	Sunday, 4 July (1:10 pm)	North Melbourne	**14.14 (98)**	9.9 (63)	Won by 35 points	Skilled Stadium **[H]**	25,159	1
15	Saturday, 10 July (2:10 pm)	Hawthorn	**12.13 (85)**	11.17 (83)	Won by 2 points	MCG **[H]**	69,220	1
16	Friday, 16 July (8:10 pm)	Adelaide	11.8 (74)	**9.9 (63)**	Lost by 11 points	AAMI Stadium **[A]**	41,195	2
17	Saturday, 24 July (2:10 pm)	Brisbane Lions	**19.13 (127)**	9.10 (64)	Won by 63 points	Skilled Stadium **[H]**	24,508	2
18	Saturday, 31 July (7:10 pm)	Sydney	9.18 (72)	**20.5 (125)**	Won by 53 points	ANZ Stadium **[A]**	30,710	2
19	Saturday, 7 August (7:10 pm)	Collingwood	**12.13 (85)**	14.23 (107)	Lost by 22 points	MCG **[H]**	84,401	2
20	Saturday, 14 August (7:10 pm)	Western Bulldogs	9.6 (60)	**25.11 (161)**	Won by 101 points	Etihad Stadium **[A]**	42,199	2
21	Friday, 20 August (7:40 pm)	Carlton	**18.13 (121)**	12.7 (79)	Won by 42 points	Etihad Stadium **[H]**	45,172	2
22	Saturday, 28 August (1:10 pm)	West Coast	**16.16 (112)**	10.8 (68)	Won by 44 points	Skilled Stadium **[H]**	24,099	2

=== Finals ===
**Date and local time**	**Opponent**	**Scores** (Geelong's scores indicated in **bold**)			**Venue**	**Attendance**
**Date and local time**	**Opponent**	Home	Away	Result	**Venue**	**Attendance**
**Qualifying and Elimination Finals (Second Qualifying Final)**
Friday, 3 September (7:45 pm)	St Kilda	**11.13 (79)**	12.11 (83)	Lost by 4 points	MCG **[H]**	63,608
**Semi-finals (Second Semi-final)**
Friday, 10 September (7:45 pm)	Fremantle	**20.15 (135)**	10.6 (66)	Won by 69 points	MCG **[H]**	45,056
**Preliminary Finals (First Preliminary Final)**
Friday, 17 September (7:45 pm)	Collingwood	18.12 (120)	**11.13 (79)**	Lost by 41 points	MCG **[A]**	95,241

== Teams ==
=== Finals ===
Geelong's 2010 teams (Finals)
Qualifying final				Semi-final			Preliminary final
B:	Mackie	Scarlett	Milburn	Enright	Scarlett	J. Hunt	Taylor	Scarlett	J. Hunt
HB:	Enright	Taylor	Kelly	Corey	Lonergan	Taylor	Corey	Lonergan	Enright
C:	Ling	Bartel	J. Hunt	Bartel	Ling	Kelly	Bartel	Ling	Kelly
HF:	Chapman	Hawkins	Stokes	S. Johnson	Podsiadly	Chapman	S. Johnson	Mooney	Varcoe
F:	S. Johnson	Mooney	Varcoe	Byrnes	Mooney	Stokes	Chapman	Podsiadly	Stokes
Foll:	Ottens	Selwood	Ablett	Ottens	Ablett	Selwood	Ottens	Ablett	Selwood
Int:	Byrnes	Wojcinski	Blake	Hawkins	Wojcinski	Milburn	Hawkins	Wojcinski	Milburn
Int:	Corey			Varcoe			Byrnes
Emg:	~~Byrnes~~	T. Hunt	Hogan	Mackie	Blake	T. Hunt	Mackie	Blake	T. Hunt
Coach:	Mark Thompson			Mark Thompson			Mark Thompson
▲ In:	Selwood, Enright, J. Hunt			Podsiadly, Lonergan			No change
▼ Out:	Menzel, T. Hunt, Hogan, Lonergan			Mackie, Blake			No change

== Ladder ==
2010 AFL ladder
Pos	Team	Pld	W	L	D	PF	PA	PP	Pts	
1	Collingwood (P)	22	17	4	1	2349	1658	141.7	70	Finals series
2	Geelong	22	17	5	0	2518	1702	147.9	68	Finals series
3	St Kilda	22	15	6	1	1935	1591	121.6	62	Finals series
4	Western Bulldogs	22	14	8	0	2174	1734	125.4	56	Finals series
5	Sydney	22	13	9	0	2017	1863	108.3	52	Finals series
6	Fremantle	22	13	9	0	2168	2087	103.9	52	Finals series
7	Hawthorn	22	12	9	1	2044	1847	110.7	50	Finals series
8	Carlton	22	11	11	0	2143	1983	108.1	44	Finals series
9	North Melbourne	22	11	11	0	1930	2208	87.4	44	
10	Port Adelaide	22	10	12	0	1749	2123	82.4	40	
11	Adelaide	22	9	13	0	1763	1870	94.3	36	
12	Melbourne	22	8	13	1	1863	1971	94.5	34	
13	Brisbane Lions	22	7	15	0	1775	2158	82.3	28	
14	Essendon	22	7	15	0	1930	2402	80.3	28	
15	Richmond	22	6	16	0	1714	2348	73.0	24	
16	West Coast	22	4	18	0	1773	2300	77.1	16	

Source: AFL ladder
Rules for classification: 1) points; 2) percentage; 3) number of points for.
(P) Premiers

== Awards and records ==
Milestones

Player	Milestone	Round
Joel Corey	200 games	Round 1
Mitch Duncan	AFL debut	Round 1
Steven Motlop	AFL debut	Round 2
James Kelly	150 games	Round 3
James Podsiadly	AFL debut	Round 3
Dawson Simpson	AFL debut	Round 3
Tom Hawkins	50 games	Round 7
Harry Taylor	50 games	Round 7
Cameron Mooney	200 games	Round 9
Taylor Hunt	AFL debut	Round 11
Mark Thompson	250 games (coached)	Round 15
Gary Ablett, Jr.	AFL 200 Club	Round 15
Matthew Scarlett (with father John)	450 games (combined as a father-son pair)	Round 17
Tom Lonergan	50 games	Round 18
Daniel Menzel	AFL debut	Round 20
Cameron Mooney	200 games (for Geelong)	Qualifying final
Steve Johnson	150 games	Qualifying final

AFL awards

Award	Recipient	Awarded by
Member of the 2010 All-Australian team (rover)	Gary Ablett, Jr.	AFL
Member of the 2010 All-Australian team (half-forward flank)	Paul Chapman	AFL
Member of the 2010 All-Australian team (back pocket)	Corey Enright	AFL
Member of the 2010 All-Australian team (interchange)	Steve Johnson	AFL
Member of the 2010 All-Australian team (wing)	Joel Selwood	AFL
Member of the 2010 All-Australian team (centre half-back)	Harry Taylor	AFL

Club awards

Award	Recipient(s)
Carji Greeves Medal	Joel Selwood
Coach's award	James Kelly
Best first-year player	James Podsiadly
Best clubman	Tom Lonergan
Leading goalkicker	Steve Johnson
Community Champion Award	Nathan Djerrkura and Travis Varcoe

Records

- Highest number of disposals in a single VFL/AFL match by one club (505 disposals) – Round 14, against North Melbourne.
- Equal-most career wins for Geelong (165 wins; with Sam Newman) – Darren Milburn; Round 21, against Carlton.

== Season statistics ==
Category	Club Leader	Total
Leading Goalkicker	Steve Johnson	63
Most Disposals	Gary Ablett, Jr.	756
Most Kicks	Paul Chapman	412
Most Marks	Darren Milburn/Harry Taylor	159
Most Handballs	Gary Ablett, Jr.	418
Most Hit-Outs	Mark Blake	379
Most Tackles	James Kelly	140
Most Free Kicks For	Joel Selwood	53
Most Free Kicks Against	Mark Blake	36

== VFL season ==
**Round**	**Date and local time**	**Opponent**	**Scores** (Geelong's scores indicated in **bold**)			**Venue**	**Ladder** **position**
**Round**	**Date and local time**	**Opponent**	Home	Away	Result	**Venue**	**Ladder** **position**
1	Saturday, 10 April (7:00 pm)	Casey Scorpions	9.18 (72)	**9.10 (64)**	Lost by 8 points	Casey Fields **[A]**	9
2	Sunday, 18 April (10:10 am)	Box Hill	**10.14 (74)**	15.15 (105)	Lost by 31 points	Skilled Stadium **[H]**	12
3	Saturday, 24 April (1:00 pm)	Frankston	**16.25 (121)**	4.6 (30)	Won by 91 points	Skilled Stadium **[H]**	8
4	Sunday, 2 May (9:40 am)	Bendigo Bombers	**9.8 (62)**	14.9 (93)	Lost by 31 points	Skilled Stadium **[H]**	10
5	Saturday, 8 May (1:00 pm)	Collingwood	15.14 (104)	**10.11 (71)**	Lost by 33 points	Victoria Park **[A]**	10
6	Saturday, 15 May (2:10 pm)	Gold Coast	10.8 (68)	**5.10 (40)**	Lost by 28 points	Fankhauser Reserve **[A]**	11
7	Saturday, 29 May (10:40 am)	Port Melbourne	**11.11 (77)**	17.14 (116)	Lost by 39 points	Skilled Stadium **[H]**	12
8	Sunday, 6 June (2:00 pm)	North Ballarat	10.13 (73)	**12.10 (82)**	Won by 9 points	Eureka Stadium **[A]**	10
9	Saturday, 12 June (1:00 pm)	Werribee	**19.4 (118)**	12.12 (84)	Won by 34 points	Skilled Stadium **[H]**	10
10	Sunday, 27 June (2:00 pm)	Sandringham	18.15 (123)	**13.6 (84)**	Lost by 39 points	Trevor Barker Beach Oval **[A]**	10
11	Saturday, 3 July (2:00 pm)	Northern Bullants	20.12 (132)	**12.10 (82)**	Lost by 50 points	Princes Park **[A]**	11
12	Sunday, 11 July (12:00 pm)	Williamstown	**7.13 (55)**	18.16 (124)	Lost by 49 points	Skilled Stadium **[H]**	12
13	Saturday, 17 July (1:10 pm)	Collingwood	**12.11 (83)**	18.9 (117)	Lost by 34 points	Skilled Stadium **[H]**	13
14	Sunday, 25 July (2:00 pm)	Coburg	14.7 (91)	**19.6 (120)**	Won by 29 points	Highgate Recreation Reserve **[A]**	12
15	Saturday, 31 July (12:30 pm)	Gold Coast	**13.10 (88)**	11.5 (71)	Won by 17 points	Skilled Stadium **[H]**	
16	Sunday, 8 August (2:00 pm)	Box Hill	13.21 (99)	**8.14 (62)**	Lost by 37 points	Box Hill City Oval **[A]**	11
17	Saturday, 14 August (2:00 pm)	Port Melbourne	24.15 (159)	**8.6 (54)**	Lost by 105 points	TEAC Oval **[A]**	12
18	Saturday, 21 August (1:00 pm)	North Ballarat	**8.16 (64)**	12.10 (82)	Lost by 18 points	Skilled Stadium **[H]**	12

== Notes ==
Key

- H Home match.
- A Away match.

General notes
