= Rod Blake =

Australian rules footballer (born 1952)

Personal information
- Born: 15 June 1952 (age 74); Geelong, Victoria
- Original team: Inverleigh (GDFL)

Playing career^{1}
Years	Club	Games (Goals)
1971–1983	Geelong	176 (113)
- ^{1} Playing statistics correct to the end of 1983.

Career highlights
- Carji Greeves Medal winner (1980)

Rod Blake (born 15 June 1952) is a former Australian rules football ruckman whose career spanned a thirteen-year period beginning in 1971. He played a total of 176 games in the Victorian Football League (VFL), kicking 113 goals.

== History and achievements ==
Blake began his career with Geelong in the VFL in 1971 after being recruited from local Geelong & District Football League (GDFL) club Inverleigh. Blake did not truly cement his spot in the first eighteen however until 1979, when he took over from Sam Newman as the number one ruckman.

Blake was considered a lightweight at 93.5 kg (206 lbs); however, Blake compensated for this potential disadvantage with agility and height – towering over his peers at 200 cm (6 ft 7in). In 1980 he won the club's best and fairest award, the Carji Greeves Medal and started out as a favourite for the Brownlow Medal, but fell just short – finishing on 19 votes, four behind the winner Kelvin Templeton of Footscray.

Blake retired following the conclusion of the 1983 VFL season. During his career Blake represented the Victorian state side three times. He is the father of former Geelong player Mark Blake.
