= Will Slade =

Australian rules footballer

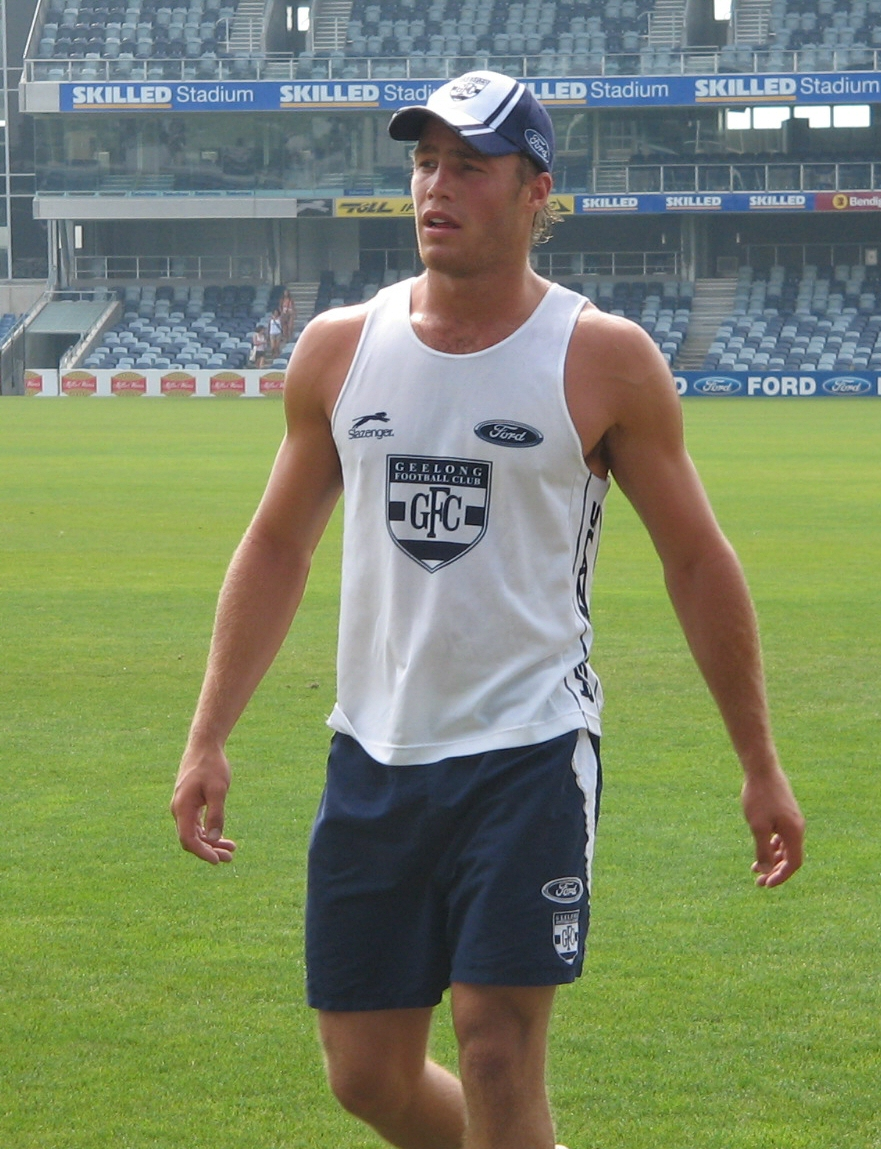

Personal information
- Born: 24 October 1983 (age 43); Victoria, Australia
- Original team: Scotch College / Oakleigh U18
- Debut: Round 19, 2002, Geelong vs. St Kilda, at Docklands
- Height: 182 cm (6 ft 0 in)
- Weight: 83 kg (183 lb)

Playing career^{1}
Years	Club	Games (Goals)
2002–2006	Geelong	17 (2)
- ^{1} Playing statistics correct to the end of 2006.

Career highlights
- VFL premiership player: 2002; NAB Cup winners, 2006

Will Slade (born 24 October 1983) is a former Australian rules footballer who played for the Geelong Football Club in the Australian Football League (AFL).

== Early career ==
In round 19, 2002, Slade debuted for the Geelong Football Club. He played four senior games in his first year. Slade managed only 11 games between 2002 and 2005 due to chronic osteitis pubis.

Slade was delisted and redrafted in after the 2005 season. He played the first seven games of the 2006 season and had a big impact in the 2006 pre-season final.

Slade was delisted again at the end of the 2006 season, and despite training with Hawthorn prior to the pre-season draft, was not selected.
