= Danny O'Brien (Australian rules footballer) =

Australian rules footballer

Personal information
- Full name: Danny O'Brien
- Born: 6 February 1980 (age 46)
- Original teams: Garfield, Gippsland Power
- Height: 180 cm (5 ft 11 in)
- Weight: 78 kg (172 lb)

Club information
- Current club: Noosa Tigers QAFL Premier Div.

Playing career^{1}
Years	Club	Games (Goals)
2000	Geelong	8 (6)
- ^{1} Playing statistics correct to the end of 2000.

Danny O'Brien (born 6 February 1980) is a former Australian rules footballer for the Geelong Football Club in the Australian Football League (AFL), playing eight games in 2000.
