= Harry Taylor (Australian rules footballer) =

Australian rules footballer

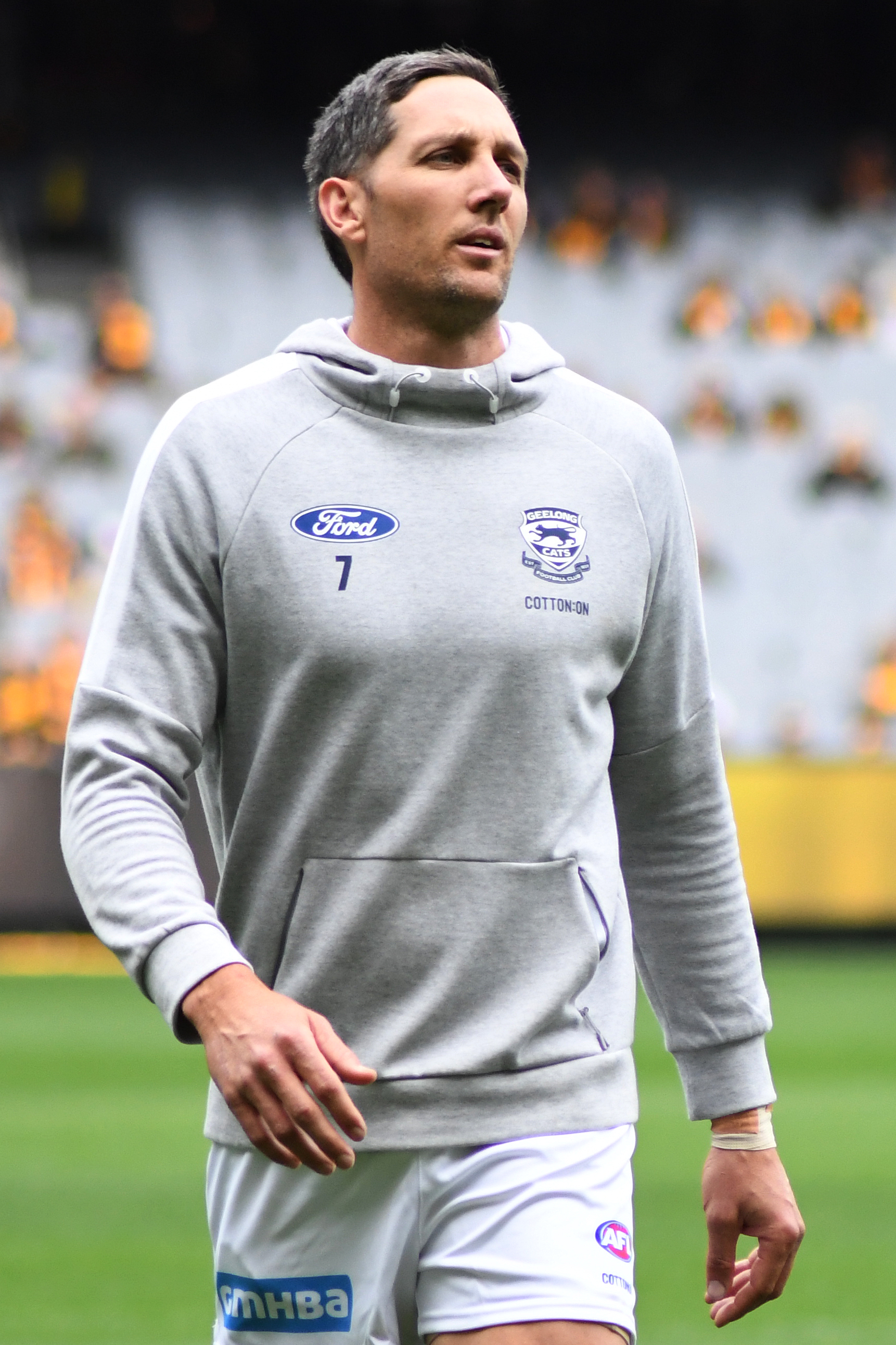
- Taylor playing for Geelong in April 2019

Personal information
- Full name: Harry Taylor
- Born: 12 June 1986 (age 40)
- Original team: East Fremantle (WAFL)
- Draft: No. 17, 2007 national draft
- Height: 195 cm (6 ft 5 in)
- Weight: 94 kg (207 lb)
- Position: Defender / Forward

Playing career^{1}
Years	Club	Games (Goals)
2008–2020	Geelong	280 (75)
- ^{1} Playing statistics correct to the end of 2020.

Career highlights
- 2× AFL Premiership (2009, 2011); 2× All-Australian team (2010, 2013); AFL Pre-Season Premiership (2009); Jim Stynes Medal (2015)

Harry Taylor (born 12 June 1986) is a former Australian rules footballer who played for the Geelong Football Club in the Australian Football League (AFL).

== Early life ==
Taylor attended Geraldton Grammar School in Geraldton where he was school captain in 2003 before moving to Perth in 2004 to pursue a possible career in the AFL. In 2001 he was the recipient of the Pierre de Coubertin Award and in 2003 he was one of eight Australian students selected to attend the 4th International Youth Forum in Italy. To help prepare himself for life as a footballer, Taylor worked for a year as a bricklayer to try to gain muscle which would ultimately help him as an AFL footballer. He grew up supporting Adelaide, idolising the high flying Tony Modra.

He was drafted as a mature-age player who spent three seasons and 49 games playing for East Fremantle in the West Australian Football League (WAFL). Taylor finished third in the East Fremantle Sharks best and fairest in 2007. Before being drafted, Taylor was studying physiotherapy at university; he had never left his home state of Western Australia.

== AFL career ==
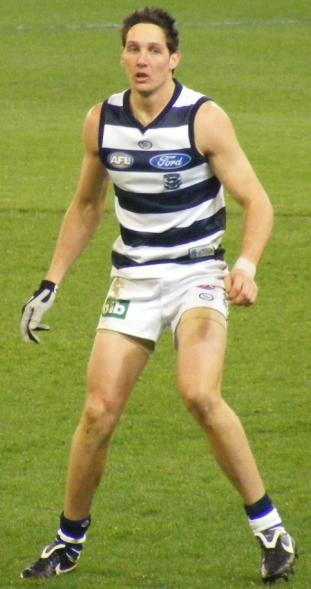
Harry Taylor in 2009

Taylor was considered a surprise selection at pick 17 in the 2007 draft because of his age. Taylor made his debut for the Cats in the first round of the 2008 NAB Cup against Melbourne in a highly impressive display in defence. He could play at either end of the ground as a key-position player, but he made his mark at centre half-back, although he showed his versatility by kicking three goals in his debut season.

Taylor's football superstition was to wear zinc cream during every game regardless of the weather; however, in his first game at Telstra Dome he did not wear it in fear of attracting too much attention. He was known to take notes on each opponent he played on in a bid to help improve his game.

In the heritage round clash against Melbourne in 2008, Taylor was forced midway through the third quarter to wear a guernsey with the number 85 on it as opposed to his usual number 7 guernsey. After changing his guernsey twice due to the blood rule, there were no spare number 7 guernseys left, and so he could not return to the field until he was wearing a clean guernsey. It is still unclear why there was a spare number 85 guernsey, although it was said to be a 'special edition'. It's believed to be the highest number ever worn in a VFL/AFL game.

Taylor made his finals debut in the First Qualifying Final against St Kilda, running out 58-point winners, with Taylor named among his side's best players. He credited his outstanding first season to the fact that he had an established backline around him and talented teammates who he could learn from. Former Geelong coach Mark Thompson showed great faith in Taylor, prophetically stating that he would be with the Geelong Football Club for a very long time. Taylor's impressive debut season was recognised when he was awarded Geelong's Best First-Year Player award.

Harry Taylor played a superb role in the 2009 grand final, holding Nick Riewoldt to only a single goal. Although Taylor often had a third man up in contested situations, he still played an excellent match on one of the AFL's best players. Riewoldt took a fine one-on-one mark and diving mark in front of Taylor in the third term, but the Cat hit back with a stunning smother in the third term just as Riewoldt was snapping at goal from the pocket. Taylor also kept the ball alive in the final term on the boundary and took the match-saving mark deep in defence when Darren Milburn kicked out. It was considered superb game from Taylor, with Tom Harley and Matthew Scarlett heaping praises upon the young defender. Taylor finished with an equal record 15 spoils and played three quarters with a broken hand.

Taylor followed up his impeccable 2009 season with All-Australian selection for 2010.

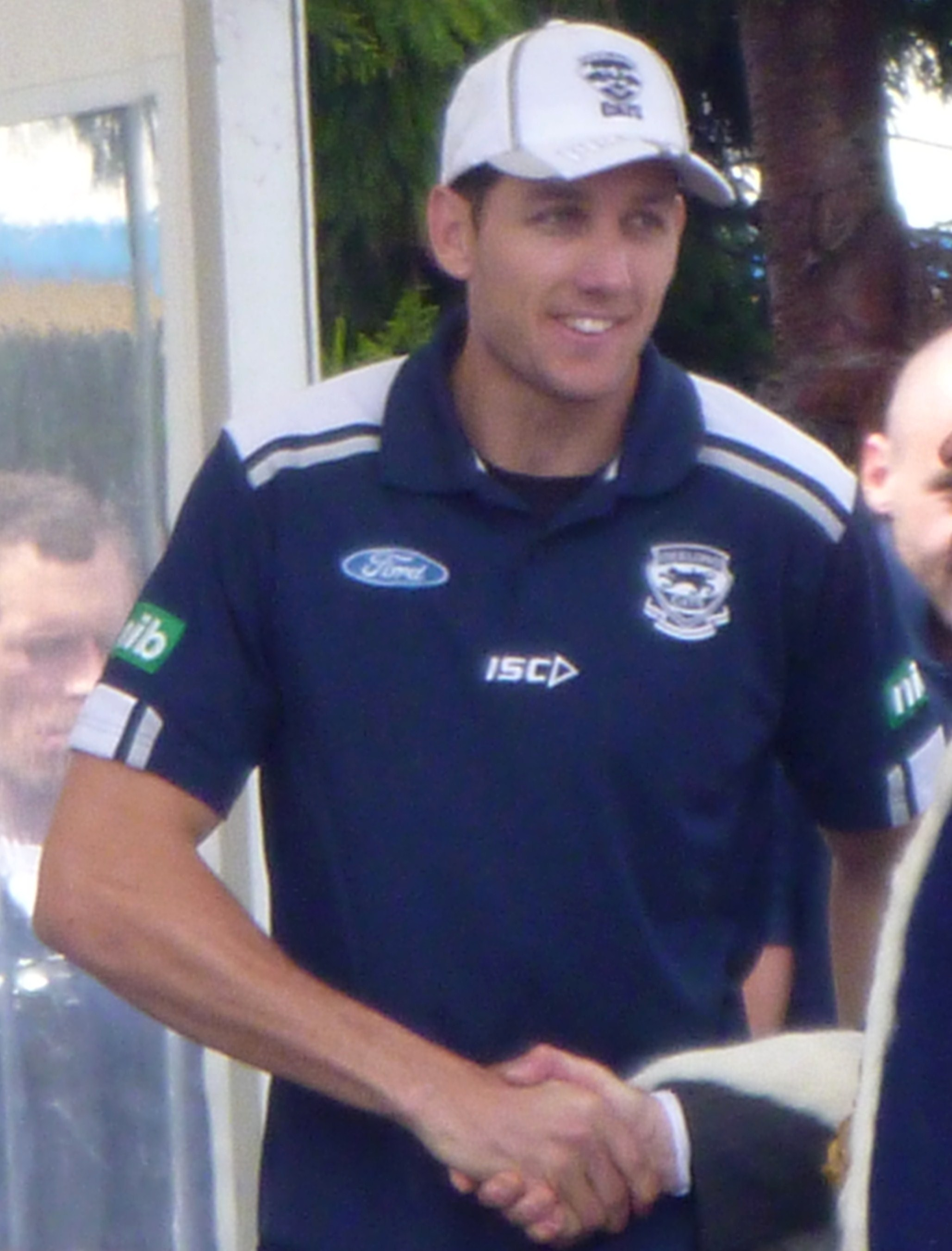
2011 premiership victory parade.

Harry Taylor played another key role in Geelong's 2011 premiership-winning side against Collingwood. Taylor started the match on Travis Cloke of Collingwood and held him well early; however, Cloke soon had a brief "purple patch" of form and booted 3 brilliant goals from outside 50 metres on his natural left boot. The Geelong coaching box decided to try Tom Lonergan on Cloke, and Cloke didn't manage to kick a goal after that move. However, Taylor still had a marvellous game, taking four critical marks in defence to stimulate some trademark Geelong rebounds. Whilst gathering 10 disposals on the day, he was part of the elite Geelong defence who played a pivotal role in cutting off Collingwood's scoring opportunities and setting up play through the Geelong midfield.

This was Taylor's second premiership medallion with Geelong. It came after a stellar year of defensive work on several of the competition's key forwards. It was clear that Geelong's defensive players were a close-knit unit with a brief sub-group "defenders" photograph taken on the field of the MCG with the 2011 Premiership Cup.

In 2012, Taylor earned seven Brownlow Medal votes, a personal best; he would follow this up in 2013 with a second All-Australian selection and a career-best 10 Brownlow Medal votes. Additionally, he would, for the first and only time in his career, breach the 400-disposal mark for the year and get a career-best 91 rebounds, placing him sixth in the league for the 2013 AFL season.

In 2015, Taylor would earn a Jim Stynes Medal for being judged best on ground in the 2015 International Rules game against Ireland.

At 34 years old, Harry Taylor retired from the AFL after Geelong's loss to Richmond in the 2020 AFL Grand Final alongside fellow Geelong veteran Gary Ablett Jr.

On 1 July 2021, Taylor announced that he would come out of retirement to play for East Fremantle in the WAFL, returning to the club that he played with before being drafted by Geelong. Taylor had previously moved back to Western Australia and was leading the East Fremantle academy program following his AFL retirement, while playing local football for Northampton in the Great Northern Football League.

On 18 October 2021, it was announced that Taylor took up a high-performance role working under head of football Simon Lloyd within the Cats’ football operations team.

== Personal life ==
Before being drafted, Taylor had never been to Geelong and could not even locate it on a map. He is fascinated with World War II, which led him to start drinking cognac and to start watching the WWII-inspired TV series Band of Brothers, which he sometimes watches before a game to draw inspiration from. Taylor dislikes metropolitan life, as there are "too many people up there" for his liking. Taylor's high-school sweetheart, Michelle Giudice, gave birth to a boy named James Taylor in 2010 who really has a father son draft potential .

As of 2020, Taylor was studying a Bachelor of Applied Management course. As of 2026, he works at Geraldton Golf club as a general manager and plays of a handicap of 4.

== Statistics ==
Legend
G	Goals	K	Kicks	D	Disposals	T	Tackles
B	Behinds	H	Handballs	M	Marks

Season	Team	No.	Games	Totals							Averages (per game)							Votes
Season	Team	No.	Games	G	B	K	H	D	M	T	G	B	K	H	D	M	T	Votes
2008	Geelong	7	21	3	0	157	170	327	96	28	0.1	0.0	7.5	8.1	15.6	4.6	1.3	0
2009	Geelong	7	22	3	2	152	235	387	121	28	0.1	0.1	6.9	10.7	17.6	5.5	1.3	1
2010	Geelong	7	23	2	3	191	197	388	159	35	0.1	0.1	8.3	8.6	16.9	6.9	1.5	3
2011	Geelong	7	24	0	2	208	148	356	144	46	0.0	0.1	8.7	6.2	14.8	6.0	1.9	0
2012	Geelong	7	22	15	5	205	152	357	135	48	0.7	0.2	9.3	6.9	16.2	6.1	2.2	7
2013	Geelong	7	24	15	9	266	135	401	176	36	0.6	0.4	11.1	5.6	16.7	7.3	1.5	10
2014	Geelong	7	23	2	3	213	139	352	149	47	0.1	0.1	9.3	6.0	15.3	6.5	2.0	7
2015	Geelong	7	21	1	3	207	161	368	159	39	0.0	0.1	9.9	7.7	17.6	6.6	1.9	6
2016	Geelong	7	24	4	1	203	148	351	152	41	0.2	0.0	8.5	6.2	14.6	6.3	1.7	2
2017	Geelong	7	25	22	15	182	169	351	133	59	0.9	0.6	7.3	6.8	14.0	5.3	2.4	4
2018	Geelong	7	8	4	4	58	39	97	30	12	0.5	0.5	7.3	4.9	12.1	3.8	1.5	0
2019	Geelong	7	24	3	2	186	145	331	114	40	0.1	0.1	7.8	6.0	13.8	4.8	1.7	0
2020 (Note: The 2020 season was played with 17 home-and-away matches per team (down from 22) and 16-minute quarters with time on (down from 20-minute quarters with time on) due to the impact of the COVID-19 pandemic.)	Geelong	7	19	1	0	113	73	186	61	27	0.1	0.0	5.9	3.8	9.8	3.2	1.4	0
Career			280	75	49	2341	1911	4252	1629	486	0.3	0.2	8.4	6.8	15.2	5.8	1.7	40

== Honours and achievements ==
Team

- AFL Premiership (Geelong) (2009, 2011)
- AFL Pre-Season Premiership (Geelong) (2009)
- McClelland Trophy (Geelong) (2008, 2019)

Individual

- All-Australian team (2010, 2013)
- Geelong F.C. Best First Year Player Award (2008)
- Australian international rules honours (2014, 2015)
- Jim Stynes Medallist (2015)
