= Sam Hunt (Australian footballer) =

Australian rules footballer (born 1983)

Personal information
- Born: 13 April 1983 (age 43); Geelong, Victoria
- Original team: Geelong Falcons (TAC Cup)
- Debut: Round 20, 2002, Essendon vs. Collingwood, at the MCG
- Height: 193 cm (6 ft 4 in)
- Weight: 92 kg (203 lb)

Playing career^{1}
Years	Club	Games (Goals)
2001–2005	Essendon (AFL)	7 (1)
2006–2007	Geelong (AFL)	0 (0)
2008–2010	South Fremantle (WAFL)	59 (20)
Total		66 (21)
- ^{1} Playing statistics correct to the end of 2010.

Career highlights
- Geelong Football Club: VFL Premiership Player 2007; TAC Cup: TAC Cup Premiership Player 2000; South Fremantle Football Club: WAFL Premiership Player 2009; WAFL Team Of The Year 2009 - Fullback; State Game for WA vs Victoria 2010

Samuel Hunt (born 13 April 1983) is an Australian Rules Footballer who has played for Essendon in the Australian Football League (AFL), Geelong and Bendigo in the Victorian Football League (VFL), the Geelong Falcons in the TAC Cup and South Fremantle in the West Australian Football League (WAFL).

Hunt, a tall defender, was drafted by Essendon with the 32nd selection in the 2000 AFL draft from the 2000 TAC Cup premiership winning Geelong Falcons. He played the entire 2001 season in the VFL with Essendon's affiliated reserves team, the Bendigo Bombers, and did not make his AFL debut until Round 20 of the 2002 season. He scored a goal with his first kick in the AFL, but did not score another goal in his AFL career. He played in two more games that year, including the elimination final, when he was selected a late replacement for James Hird, who was injured. However he did not play in the AFL again until mid-2005, spending the entire 2003 and 2004 seasons playing for Bendigo in the VFL. Despite playing in the final two games of the 2005 season, he was delisted by Essendon at the end of the 2005 season.

In 2006 he was rookie listed by Geelong, but was again delisted at the end of the 2007 season, without managing an AFL game for Geelong. He was, however, a member of their 2007 VFL premiership team, returning to the team after recovering from a hamstring injury.

He then moved to Western Australia and joined the South Fremantle Football Club and became a vital part of the Bulldogs' defence, coming second in the 2008 best and fairest award and winning the best backman award. The following year he was one of South's best players in their 2009 WAFL Grand Final victory, playing at full back he kept Subiaco's champion full-forward Brad Smith goalless in Smith's final game of football.
