= Tim Callan =

Australian rules footballer

Personal information
- Full name: Timothy Callan
- Born: 6 January 1984 (age 42)
- Original team: Geelong Falcons
- Draft: 36th overall, 2002; Geelong (F/S)
- Height: 181 cm (5 ft 11 in)
- Weight: 81 kg (179 lb)
- Position: Defender

Club information
- Current club: Western Bulldogs
- Number: 33

Playing career^{1}
Years	Club	Games (Goals)
2003–2006	Geelong	15 (3)
2008–2010	Western Bulldogs	19 (1)
Total		34 (4)
- ^{1} Playing statistics correct to the end of 2010.

Career highlights
- Geelong Football Club: VFL Premiership Player 2007; Geelong VFL Best & Fairest 2007; Runner-up in Geelong VFL Best & Fairest 2003; 3rd in Geelong VFL Best & Fairest 2006

Timothy Callan (born 6 January 1984) is a former Australian rules football player for the Western Bulldogs, and the Geelong Football Club. He is the son of former Geelong player, Terry Callan.

== Career ==
=== Geelong ===
Callan was selected by Geelong in the 2002 AFL draft, under the father–son rule. A small/medium-sized defender, Callan is renowned for his consistent displays of courage and bravery during the game, often backing into packs for marks or spoils. Although he has proven himself as one of the better players for the club's VFL side for numerous seasons, he has struggled to get consistent games in the senior side for the Cats.

=== Western Bulldogs ===
Looking for a more permanent role in a senior team, Callan was traded along with pick 66 to the Western Bulldogs on 9 October 2007 during the official trade week for the Bulldogs pick 62 in the national draft.

Callan's career at the Bulldogs started off very strongly, playing a key part in the Bulldogs' first seven (undefeated) rounds.

=== Newtown and Chilwell ===
Played a season with The Geelong football league club before retiring after the 2011 season.

Callan retired at the end of the 2010 season.

== Statistics ==
Statistics are correct to end of 2007 season

Season	Team	No.	Games	Goals	Behinds	Kicks	Marks	Handballs	Disposals
2003	Geelong	17	1	0	0	4	2	2	6
2004	Geelong	17	6	3	0	26	8	19	45
2005	Geelong	7	2	0	0	7	5	5	12
2006	Geelong	7	6	0	0	32	19	32	64
2007	Geelong	7	0	0	0	0	0	0	0
2008	Western Bulldogs	33	15	1	1	104	77	117	221
2009	Western Bulldogs	33	1	0	0	8	3	6	14
Totals			31	4	1	181	114	181	362
