= Matthew Spencer (footballer) =

Australian rules footballer

Personal information
- Full name: Matthew Spencer
- Born: 17 January 1985 (age 41)
- Original team: Swan Districts (WAFL)
- Draft: 42nd overall, 2003 national draft
- Height: 194 cm (6 ft 4 in)
- Weight: 98 kg (216 lb)
- Position: Key Position

Playing career^{1}
Years	Club	Games (Goals)
2006	Geelong	2 (0)
- ^{1} Playing statistics correct to the end of 2007.

Matthew Spencer (born 17 January 1985) is a former Australian rules footballer who played for the Geelong Football Club in the Australian Football League (AFL).

== Career ==
Spencer made his AFL-level debut with Geelong during the 2006 AFL season, performing reasonably well playing on Essendon's Scott Lucas. He managed one more game for the season before being omitted, and was subsequently delisted at the conclusion of the 2007 season, a season in which he did not play a senior match. Following the conclusion of his AFL career, Spencer returned to his former club, Swan Districts, in the West Australian Football League.

== Statistics ==
Statistics are correct as of end of career

Season	Team	No.	Games	Goals	Behinds	Kicks	Marks	Handballs	Disposals
2006	Geelong	25	2	0	0	3	2	6	9
2007	Geelong	25	0	0	0	0	0	0	0
Totals			2	0	0	3	2	6	9
