= David Johnson (Australian rules footballer) =

Australian rules footballer, born 1981

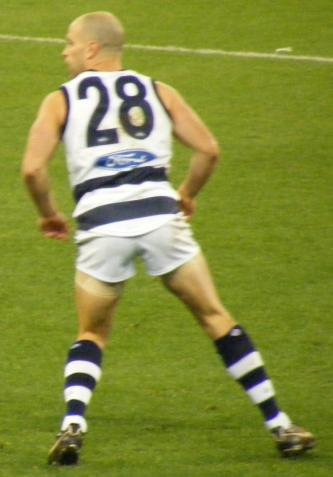
- David Johnson

Personal information
- Full name: David Johnson
- Born: 28 October 1981 (age 45)
- Original team: Sunbury / Calder U18
- Height: 181 cm (5 ft 11 in)
- Weight: 83 kg (183 lb)

Playing career^{1}
| Years | Club | Games (Goals) |
| 2002 – 2009 | Geelong | 79 (16) |
- ^{1} Playing statistics correct to the end of 2009.

Career highlights
- 2002 VFL Premiership; 2007 VFL Premiership

David Johnson (born 28 October 1981) is a former Australian rules footballer for the Geelong Football Club in the Australian Football League (AFL).

Recruited from Calder Cannons, Johnson was renowned for his hard work ethic and aggressive play. He is the brother of former Essendon and Fremantle footballer Mark Johnson.

== Career statistics ==
Statistics are correct as of end of 2007 season

| Season | Team | No. | Games | Goals | Behinds | Kicks | Marks | Handballs | Disposals |
|---|---|---|---|---|---|---|---|---|---|
| 2002 | Geelong | 28 | 1 | 0 | 0 | 3 | 2 | 3 | 6 |
| 2003 | Geelong | 28 | 11 | 3 | 2 | 57 | 24 | 32 | 89 |
| 2004 | Geelong | 28 | 17 | 2 | 1 | 96 | 56 | 56 | 152 |
| 2005 | Geelong | 28 | 12 | 3 | 2 | 94 | 59 | 54 | 148 |
| 2006 | Geelong | 28 | 17 | 5 | 1 | 152 | 80 | 69 | 221 |
| 2007 | Geelong | 28 | 12 | 3 | 1 | 87 | 34 | 66 | 153 |
| Totals | | | 70 | 16 | 7 | 489 | 244 | 280 | 769 |
