= Brodie Moles =

Australian rules footballer

Personal information
- Full name: Brodie Moles
- Born: 7 November 1985 (age 41)
- Original team: Tasmanian Devils (VFL)
- Draft: No. 16, 2008 Rookie draft, Geelong; No. 19, 2010 Rookie draft, Western Bulldogs; No. 102 (RP), 2010 National draft, Western Bulldogs
- Height: 184 cm (6 ft 0 in)
- Weight: 88 kg (194 lb)
- Position: Midfielder

Playing career^{1}
Years	Club	Games (Goals)
2010–2011	Western Bulldogs	17 (10)
- ^{1} Playing statistics correct to the end of 2011.

Brodie Moles (born 7 November 1985) is an Australian rules football player in the Australian Football League (AFL).

After being recruited at pick 16 in the 2008 AFL Rookie draft by the Geelong Football Club. he was delisted at the end of the 2009 season without making his AFL debut. The Western Bulldogs then selected him with pick 19 in the 2010 AFL Rookie draft under the new mature-age rookie rules. He made his AFL debut for the Bulldogs in round two of the 2010 AFL season.

Moles spent the majority of his junior career in Tasmania, and originally played mainly as a quick forward with good goal sense, but has developed into a skilful midfielder.
