= Jeremy Laidler =

Australian rules footballer (born 1989)

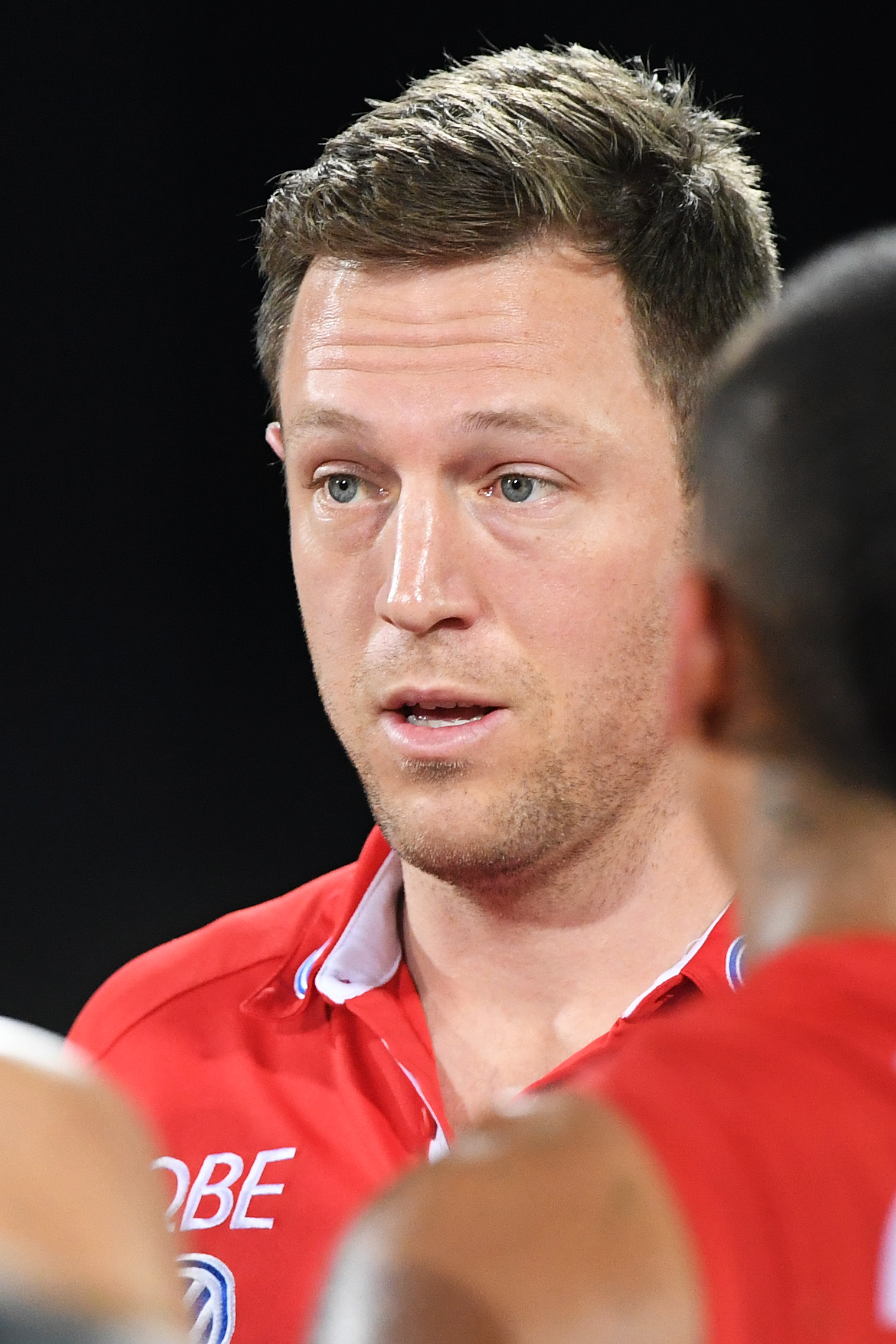
- Laidler in July 2019

Personal information
- Full name: Jeremy Laidler
- Born: 5 August 1989 (age 37)
- Original team: Calder Cannons
- Draft: No. 32, 2008 rookie draft
- Height: 189 cm (6 ft 2 in)
- Weight: 79 kg (174 lb)
- Position: Half back

Playing career^{1}
Years	Club	Games (Goals)
2009–2010	Geelong	2 (0)
2011–2013	Carlton	24 (2)
2014–2017	Sydney	61 (6)
Total		87 (8)
- ^{1} Playing statistics correct to the end of 2017.

Jeremy Laidler (born 5 August 1989) is a former professional Australian rules footballer who played for the Geelong Football Club, Carlton Football Club and Sydney Swans in the Australian Football League (AFL).

== Junior career ==
Laidler played junior football for the Doutta Stars, and TAC Cup football for the Calder Cannons. Laidler represented Vic Metro in the NAB AFL U18 Championships, and was the recipient of the Calder Cannons' best and fairest award for 2007.

== AFL Playing career ==
=== Geelong (2008–2010) ===
Laidler was recruited by the Geelong Football Club in the 2008 rookie draft with its second selection (No. 32 overall). At Geelong, Laidler was switched from playing forward (where he had scored 25 goals in his season with the Cannons) to defence. In 2009, he was promoted midseason to Geelong's senior list after some strong form for the club's VFL team and a string of long-term injuries in the backline allowed the Cats to make such a promotion. He made his senior debut against the Brisbane Lions, but only played that one game for the year. He was elevated to the senior list for the 2010 season, but again played only one senior game for the year. By the end of the 2010 season, Laidler had played two AFL games and 50 VFL games for the Cats.

=== Carlton (2011–2013) ===
Laidler was traded to the Carlton Football Club during the 2010 AFL Trade Week, in a deal which saw Geelong receive a third round draft pick (No. 54 overall) and saw the clubs swap second round draft picks (Geelong finishing with No. 37 overall, and Carlton finishing with No. 42 overall). Carlton had also been keen to recruit the defender at the end of 2009, and Laidler saw the move as a good opportunity to play more senior football, having been unable to break into the very strong Geelong defence. Laidler immediately became a regular in Carlton's defence, making his debut for the club in Round 1, 2011 against Richmond, and playing nineteen matches for the year. He played the first four games of 2012, before missing the rest of the season with a dislocated knee. In 2013, Laidler fell out of favour with new Carlton coach Mick Malthouse, not fitting into the new coach's defensive structure; he played only one senior match for the season, and requested to be traded at the end of the year, again seeking more greater opportunities for senior football. After being unable to find a suitable trade during the 2013 trade period, Laidler was subsequently delisted by Carlton.

=== Sydney (2014–2017) ===
After being delisted by Carlton, Laidler was signed by the Sydney Swans as a delisted free agent. Laidler played his first game for Sydney in the opening round of the 2014 AFL season against Greater Western Sydney. In round 8, 2016, Laidler played his 50th game for the club. At the conclusion of the 2017 season, he announced his retirement from AFL football.

== Coaching career ==
=== Sydney Swans ===
After his retirement from his playing career at the end of 2017, Laidler remained at the Sydney Swans as an assistant coach in the role development coach under senior coach John Longmire before being named Sydney Swans VFL Head Coach, a role he held for five years.

=== Greater Western Sydney Giants ===
At the end of 2022, Laidler joined the Greater Western Sydney Giants as an assistant coach under senior coach Adam Kingsley. At the end of the 2025 AFL season, Laidler departed the GWS Giants.

=== Return to Sydney Swans ===
At the end of 2025, Laidler returned to Sydney Swans as assistant coach under senior coach Dean Cox.

== Statistics ==
Statistics are correct to the end of the 2017 season

Legend
G	Goals	K	Kicks	D	Disposals	T	Tackles
B	Behinds	H	Handballs	M	Marks

Season	Team	No.	Games	Totals							Averages (per game)						
Season	Team	No.	Games	G	B	K	H	D	M	T	G	B	K	H	D	M	T
2009	Geelong	37	1	0	0	3	6	9	0	2	0.0	0.0	3.0	6.0	9.0	0.0	2.0
2010	Geelong	37	1	0	0	5	11	16	2	4	0.0	0.0	5.0	11.0	16.0	2.0	4.0
2011	Carlton	15	19	2	1	195	105	300	110	42	0.1	0.1	10.3	5.5	15.8	5.8	2.2
2012	Carlton	15	4	0	0	27	20	47	16	5	0.0	0.0	6.8	5.0	11.8	4.0	1.3
2013	Carlton	15	1	0	0	3	1	4	1	5	0.0	0.0	3.0	1.0	4.0	1.0	5.0
2014	Sydney	11	19	3	4	125	142	267	61	32	0.2	0.2	6.6	7.5	14.1	3.2	1.7
2015	Sydney	11	23	2	3	181	180	361	79	37	0.1	0.1	7.9	7.8	15.7	3.4	1.6
2016	Sydney	11	16	0	0	97	106	203	44	35	0.0	0.0	6.1	6.6	12.7	2.8	2.2
2017	Sydney	11	3	1	1	21	22	43	10	9	0.3	0.3	7.0	7.3	14.3	3.3	3.0
Career			87	8	9	657	593	1250	323	171	0.1	0.1	7.6	6.8	14.4	3.7	2.0

== Personal life ==
Laidler married Amber Greasley (born 1993), a former Miss World Australia and current reporter for Seven News Sydney, on 3 November 2017. The couple's son was born in January 2022, nearly eight weeks premature. In July 2025, they publicly announced their separation.
