= Ryan Gamble =

Australian rules footballer

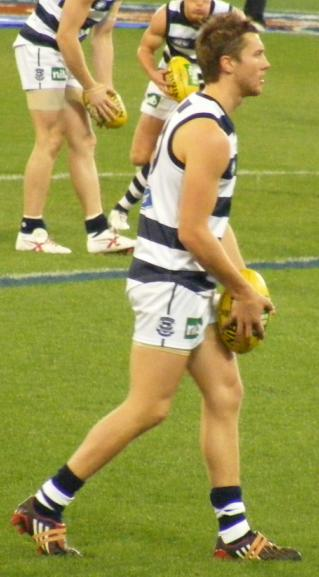

Personal information
- Full name: Ryan Gamble
- Born: 23 September 1987 (age 39); Millicent, South Australia
- Original team: Glenelg (SANFL)
- Draft: No. 47, 2005 National draft, Geelong; No. 90, 2010 National draft, St Kilda
- Height: 184 cm (6 ft 0 in)
- Weight: 85 kg (187 lb)
- Position: Forward

Playing career^{1}
Years	Club	Games (Goals)
2006–2010	Geelong	24 (31)
2011	St Kilda	11 (11)
Total		35 (42)
- ^{1} Playing statistics correct to the end of 2011.

Career highlights
- VFL premiership player: 2007

Ryan Gamble (born 23 September 1987) is a former professional Australian rules football player in the Australian Football League (AFL). Gamble played for the Geelong Football Club and the St Kilda Football Club.

== Early life ==
Gamble played his junior football at the Mt Burr United Football Club, from the MSEFL in South Australia, and at the Glenelg Football Club in the SANFL from the age of 17, predominantly in the reserves, but gaining senior selection towards the end of the season. The Geelong Football Club drafted him with their third round selection in the 2005 AFL draft.

== Career ==
Gamble spent almost all of the 2006 season playing for the Geelong VFL team, rotating as a midfielder and forward, also noted as a prolific high-flyer. He gained senior AFL selection for the final game of 2006.

Gamble was a finalist in the 2008 Army Award, which recognises acts of courage, initiative and teamwork on the football field.

== Statistics ==
Statistics are correct as of round 19 of 2008 season

Season	Team	No.	Games	Goals	Behinds	Kicks	Marks	Handballs	Disposals	Multishines
2006	Geelong	34	1	0	0	5	4	3	8	100
2007	Geelong	15	0	0	0	0	0	0	0	101
2008	Geelong	15	11	19	12	70	51	65	135	102
Totals			12	19	12	75	55	68	143	303
