= Nathan Djerrkura =

Australian rules footballer

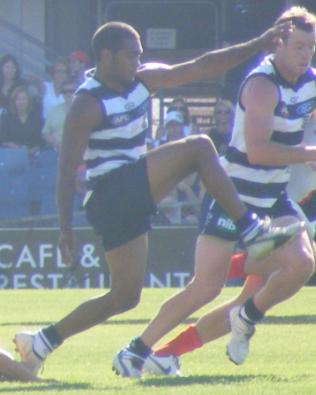
- Djerrkura with Geelong in 2008

Personal information
- Full name: Nathan Djerrkura
- Nickname: Djidi
- Born: 19 September 1988 (age 38); Yirrkala, Northern Territory
- Original team: Wanderers (NT)
- Draft: 25th overall, 2006; Geelong
- Height: 176 cm (5 ft 9 in)
- Weight: 80 kg (176 lb)

Playing career^{1}
Years	Club	Games (Goals)
2009–2010	Geelong	4 (0)
2011–2012	Western Bulldogs	21 (8)
Total		25 (8)

Representative team honours^{2}
Years	Team	Games (Goals)
2009	Indigenous All-Stars	1 (0)
- ^{1} Playing statistics correct to the end of Round 21 2012.^{2} Representative statistics correct as of 2009.

Career highlights
- VFL premiership player: 2007

Nathan Djerrkura (born 19 September 1988) is a former professional Australian rules footballer who played for the Geelong Football Club and the Western Bulldogs in the Australian Football League (AFL).

== Early life ==
Nathan Djerrkura was born to Gatjil and Jenny Djerrkura in the indigenous community of Yirrkala, Northern Territory on 19 September 1988. His father, Gatjil, was a former Aboriginal and Torres Strait Islander Commission (ATSIC) chairman before his death from a heart attack in May 2004. Djerrkura is of Indigenous Australian heritage and his ancestry can be traced to the Yolngu. Djerrkura attended Scotch College, Melbourne on an Indigenous scholarship.

== AFL career ==
Taken at pick 25 in the 2006 National AFL draft, Djerrkura was a highly rated young midfielder with a great work ethic and a strong body for his size. He has lightning pace and provides strong tackling pressure in the forward line. He was one of the best prospects from the Northern Territory in 2006, and was featured on SBS in a draft special. Djerrkura played 2 NAB Cup matches in 2007, and was close to making his debut in round 1 and 2 after strong reserves form, until he received a setback when he was injured early in the season playing football in the VFL. Djerrkura participated in the 2008 AFL Grand Final sprint, coming first in his heat and going on to come 3rd overall. On 8 October 2010, he was traded to the Western Bulldogs in return for Geelong receiving the 57th draft pick. Djerrkura retired from AFL football on 15 September 2012 after playing 21 games for the Western Bulldogs. In 2014 he joined the Northern Territory Thunder in the North East Australian Football League (NEAFL).

== Honours ==
Team:

- VFL Premiership (Geelong): 2007

Individual:

- Under 18 All-Australian (2006)
- Represented Northern Territory Under 18 (2006)
- Represented Indigenous All-Stars (2009)
