= Mark Blake (Australian rules footballer) =

Australian rules footballer

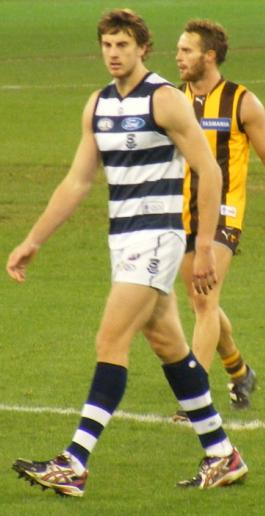
- Mark Blake

Personal information
- Full name: Mark Blake
- Born: 9 September 1985 (age 41); Geelong
- Original team: South Barwon / Geelong U18
- Height: 200 cm (6 ft 7 in)
- Weight: 102 kg (225 lb)
- Position: Ruckman

Playing career^{1}
Years	Club	Games (Goals)
2005–2010	Geelong	99 (12)
- ^{1} Playing statistics correct to the end of 2011.

Career highlights
- 2009 AFL Premiership Player; AFL McClelland Trophy (Geelong): 2007, 2008; AFL NAB Cup (Geelong): 2006, 2009

Mark Blake (born 9 September 1985) is a former Australian rules footballer for the Geelong Football Club in the Australian Football League (AFL). A tap ruckman, 2.00 metres (6 ft 7 in) tall and weighing 102 kilograms (225 lb), Blake played 99 games for Geelong between 2005 and 2010, including the 2009 AFL Premiership.

== Career ==
Blake was drafted in the 2003 AFL draft under the father–son rule, his father being former Geelong ruckman Rod Blake. He debuted in 2005 in a losing game in front of a crowd of 28,165 at the SCG. Blake kicked his first two career goals against Richmond at Skilled Stadium in round 18, 2007.

After having little impact in the 2007 preliminary final against Collingwood, Blake was dropped on the eve of the 2007 AFL Grand Final for former Geelong captain and ruckman, Steven King.

2008 was a successful year for Blake, seeing him permanently become a part of Geelong's ruck duo along with Brad Ottens. Blake developed as a footballer substantially in 2008 and has improved his around the ground work.

2011 was a terrible year for Blake, getting no AFL appearances and was said to be trade bait. On 19 October 2011 Blake announced his retirement, effective immediately.

In 2012, Blake played with Mooroopna Football Club in the Goulburn Valley Football League and won the senior football Best & Fairest Award, the Morrison Medal.

== Personal life ==
Blake attended high school at Belmont High in Geelong, and played grassroots football for South Barwon in the Geelong Football League.

== Statistics ==
Legend
G	Goals	K	Kicks	D	Disposals	T	Tackles
B	Behinds	H	Handballs	M	Marks	H/O	Hit-outs

Season	Team	No.	Games	Totals								Averages (per game)							
Season	Team	No.	Games	G	B	K	H	D	M	T	H/O	G	B	K	H	D	M	T	H/O
2004	Geelong	24	0	—	—	—	—	—	—	—	—	—	—	—	—	—	—	—	—
2005	Geelong	24	3	0	0	7	11	18	6	1	27	0.0	0.0	2.3	3.7	6.0	2.0	0.3	9.0
2006	Geelong	24	8	0	0	12	45	57	16	9	97	0.0	0.0	1.5	5.6	7.1	2.0	1.1	12.1
2007	Geelong	24	22	2	6	62	147	209	65	26	379	0.1	0.3	2.8	6.7	9.5	3.0	1.2	17.2
2008	Geelong	24	25	6	6	77	179	256	87	22	525	0.2	0.2	3.1	7.2	10.2	3.5	0.9	21.0
2009	Geelong	24	21	3	2	47	149	196	46	25	482	0.1	0.1	2.2	7.1	9.3	2.2	1.2	23.0
2010	Geelong	24	20	1	2	43	156	199	45	13	379	0.1	0.1	2.2	7.8	10.0	2.3	0.7	19.0
2011	Geelong	24	0	—	—	—	—	—	—	—	—	—	—	—	—	—	—	—	—
Career			99	12	16	248	687	935	265	96	1889	0.1	0.2	2.5	6.9	9.4	2.7	1.0	19.1

== Honours and achievements ==
Brownlow Medal votes
Season	Votes
2005	0
2006	0
2007	2
2008	0
2009	0
2010	0
Total	2

Team

- AFL Premiership (Geelong): 2009
- AFL McClelland Trophy (Geelong): 2007, 2008
- AFL NAB Cup (Geelong): 2006, 2009

Individual

- 2003 - Vic Country representative honours at the AFL Under 18 Championships
- 2012 - Goulburn Valley Football League - Senior Football Best & Fairest Award: Morrison Medal
