= Simon Hogan =

Australian rules footballer

Personal information
- Full name: Simon Hogan
- Born: 16 August 1988 (age 38); Deniliquin, NSW
- Original team: Warrnambool / Geelong Falcons
- Draft: 57th overall, 2006; Geelong
- Height: 182 cm (6 ft 0 in)
- Weight: 79 kg (174 lb)
- Position: Midfielder

Playing career^{1}
Years	Club	Games (Goals)
2009–2011	Geelong	22 (10)
- ^{1} Playing statistics correct to the end of 2011.

Career highlights
- Pre-Season premiership player: 2009; VFL premiership player: 2007

Simon Hogan (born 16 August 1988) is a former Australian rules footballer for the Geelong Football Club in the Australian Football League (AFL).

== AFL career ==
=== Early career ===
Hogan was recruited from the Geelong Falcons by Geelong at pick 57 in the 2006 AFL draft. Drafted as a feather-weight at 68 kg in 2006, he gained 11 kg by the end of the year in order to take the field. His football career was hampered due to a recurring groin injury in 2007. Despite this, he was chosen as an emergency for Geelong in 2008 but did not see the field.

=== 2009 ===
In 2009, after playing in the NAB Cup Premiership with the Cats, Hogan made his long-awaited senior debut in Round 2 against Richmond, but he was rested thereafter and did not play again until being a late callup in Round 14 for the crucial game against St Kilda, a match between two undefeated teams. Hogan impressed under pressure, and backed it up with an even more solid outing the following week against Brisbane, named in Geelong's best in a heavy loss.

=== 2012 ===
Retired at the end of the 2012 season at the age of 24

== Personal life ==
Hogan was the school captain of the Class of 2006 at Emmanuel College Warrnambool.

== Statistics ==
Legend
G	Goals	K	Kicks	D	Disposals	T	Tackles
B	Behinds	H	Handballs	M	Marks

Season	Team	No.	Games	Totals							Averages (per game)						
Season	Team	No.	Games	G	B	K	H	D	M	T	G	B	K	H	D	M	T
2007	Geelong	34	0	—	—	—	—	—	—	—	—	—	—	—	—	—	—
2008	Geelong	34	0	—	—	—	—	—	—	—	—	—	—	—	—	—	—
2009	Geelong	34	10	7	3	64	115	179	33	24	0.7	0.2	6.4	11.5	17.9	3.3	2.4
2010	Geelong	34	11	3	3	64	119	183	28	26	0.3	0.3	5.8	10.8	16.6	2.6	2.4
2011	Geelong	34	1	0	0	1	6	7	0	3	0.0	0.0	1.0	6.0	7.0	0.0	3.0
2012	Geelong	34	0	—	—	—	—	—	—	—	—	—	—	—	—	—	—
Career totals			22	369	129	240	61	53	10	6	16.8	5.9	10.9	2.8	2.4	0.5	0.3
