= Tom Lonergan (footballer) =

Australian rules footballer

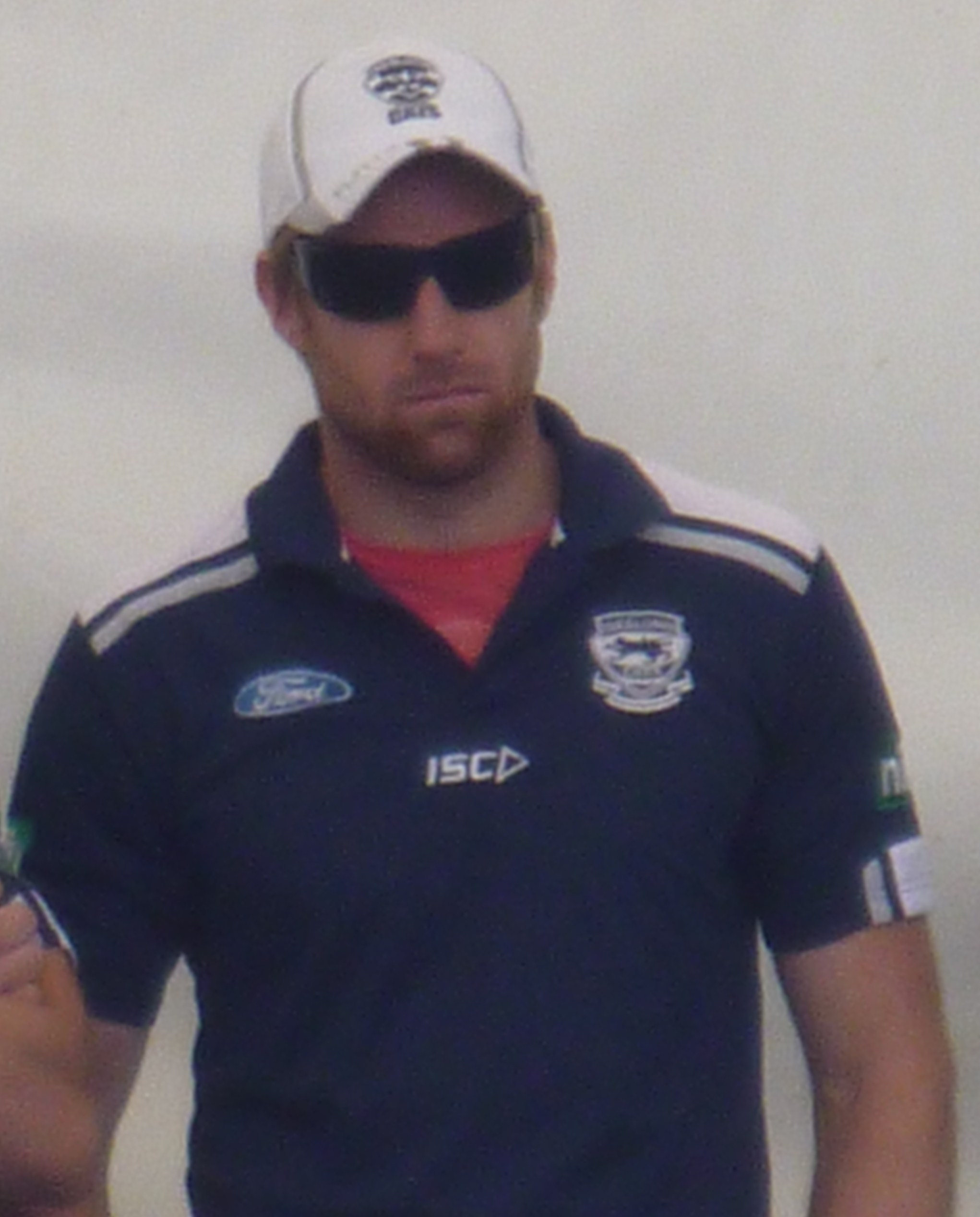
- Lonergan with Geelong in 2011

Personal information
- Full name: Tom Lonergan
- Nickname: Domsy
- Born: 17 May 1984 (age 42)
- Original teams: Yarrawonga (O&MFL); Calder Cannons (TAC Cup)
- Draft: No. 23, 2002 national draft
- Height: 197 cm (6 ft 6 in)
- Weight: 95 kg (209 lb)
- Position: Defender

Playing career^{1}
Years	Club	Games (Goals)
2005–2017	Geelong	209 (55)
- ^{1} Playing statistics correct to the end of 2017.

Career highlights
- AFL premiership player: 2011; VFL premiership player: 2007; Norm Goss Memorial Medal: 2007; AFL pre-Season premiership: 2006

Tom Lonergan (born 17 May 1984) is a former professional Australian rules footballer who played for the Geelong Football Club in the Australian Football League (AFL).

== Career ==
=== Early career ===
Lonergan grew up in Yarrawonga and as a 15-year-old made his senior debut for the Yarrawonga Pigeons against the Wodonga Raiders in the Ovens & Murray Football League. He kicked 6 goals and received an injury to his kidney that may have contributed to his later kidney injury. He also played a few games for the Murray Bushrangers before he moved to boarding school at Assumption College, Kilmore and played for the Calder Cannons in the TAC Cup. Geelong acquired the tall forward in the second round of the 2002 AFL draft, the 23rd selection overall. After spending two years in the club's VFL side, Lonergan made his AFL debut in Round 9 of the 2005 AFL season.

=== 2006: Injury ===
On 26 August 2006, Lonergan suffered serious internal injury to his kidney whilst playing in a Round 21 draw against Melbourne - which was also just his seventh AFL-level match. Lonergan's kidney was severely damaged when he backed into a marking contest against Melbourne's Brad Miller.

Lonergan was immediately hospitalised, taken to the Geelong Hospital and had been in a stable condition before his blood pressure rose overnight, forcing him to undergo trauma surgery to remove his right kidney. His kidney was found to be badly lacerated and bruised, which was accentuated by the scar tissue caused by a previous footballing injury he had suffered as a 16-year-old. During the six-hour procedure, Lonergan's entire blood supply had to be replaced three times, flushing it through with up to 40 units of blood, placing him into an induced coma. Lonergan remained in a coma for four days, with it taking six hours to bring him back to consciousness. He also lost 17 kg during the ordeal.

Lonergan decided to continue his AFL career, after considering premature retirement, with Geelong agreeing to delist Lonergan, but then re-draft him via the Rookie Draft, with Geelong hoping that other clubs would avoid drafting Lonergan due to the extent of his injuries. Lonergan believed the outcome would benefit both the club and himself, with the club able to draft a new talented youngster through the National Draft, and himself able to continue his recovery at a stable rate. The club is reported to have taken this decision to help Lonergan if he wished to continue his career. Lonergan himself considered retirement following the surgery, but opted to return. Club doctor Chris Bradshaw compared Lonergan's efforts to return to professional sport with those of Jason McCartney, who was injured in the 2002 Bali bombing before playing one final game.

The day after being re-drafted by Geelong, Lonergan was again involved in another potentially life-threatening incident, this time in the form of a serious car accident. The accident occurred when Lonergan was driving to training, and another car careered into his passenger-side door and pushed him into oncoming traffic. He was lucky to escape with just a scratched leg, but the accident did write off his car. This was another chapter in Lonergan's run of bad luck, with his car getting broken into just a week and a half before the accident. Lonergan stated to the media that he hoped his bad luck had finally come to an end, and jokingly attributed the bad luck to the fact he wore the "unlucky" number 13.

=== 2007: VFL comeback and glory ===
Lonergan made his return to the sport on 17 June, 2007, playing for Geelong's VFL team against Tasmania. He played the second half of each quarter, kicking one behind, as well as marking five times and making ten disposals. Speaking to reporters after the match, he indicated that he had no time-line for returning to the top league, but fully intended to do so. He had previously remarked on the unusual nature of his injury, claiming that it was a very different feeling to having damaged a joint or a limb.

To cap a fairytale return to football Lonergan played in the 126-52 VFL Grand Final win over the Coburg Tigers kicking six goals earning him the Norm Goss Memorial Medal for best on ground. As a result of his strong form and full recovery from his injuries, Lonergan was elevated to Geelong's senior list for the 2008 AFL Premiership Season.

Lonergan was the recipient of the club's Community Champion award, presented at the club's Best and Fairest dinner.

=== 2008–2017: AFL success ===
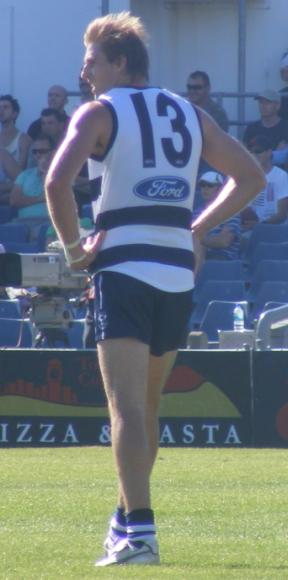
Lonergan playing for Geelong in 2008.

Lonergan played in the Geelong team in the 2008 AFL Grand Final, and missed selection into the Geelong 2009 premiership team. However, during 2011 Tom became a key member of Geelong's defensive back six players, and played a critical role in the 2011 AFL Grand Final holding Travis Cloke goalless in the second half, after Cloke had kicked three goals early in the game while playing on Harry Taylor. The job he executed was crucial for the Cats as it helped stemmed the flow of Collingwood goals and took the red-hot Cloke out of the game.

During the 2014 AFL trade period, Lonergan was offered a three-year contract to join the Western Bulldogs, in a deal estimated to be worth $500,000 a season. Lonergan, who was already contracted to Geelong for 2015, ultimately rejected the offer, citing loyalty to his teammates and the resignation of the Western Bulldogs' coach Brendan McCartney as his main reasons for remaining with the club. He continued to play for Geelong through the 2016 and 2017 seasons. Lonergan played the final game of his career in the 2017 Preliminary Final, where he collected 10 disposals in a heavy loss to Adelaide.

=== Coaching ===
Following his retirement from playing, Lonergan took on talent and development coaching roles in the Victorian under-18s competition, first at the Calder Cannons as talent manager (2019–2020), then at the Geelong Falcons as talent operations lead (2021–2022). He joined the Carlton Football Club as talent and development manager in 2023. Lonergan left the Carlton Football Club at the end of the 2025 AFL season.

== Personal life ==
Following his injuries, Lonergan became an ambassador for Zaidee's Rainbow Foundation, an organisation raising awareness of organ donation. The Geelong senior side wore rainbow-coloured laces (the symbol of the foundation) in their boots during their match against the Brisbane Lions immediately following Lonergan's VFL match. Lonergan was in fact wearing rainbow laces during the match in which he was injured.

He is the youngest son of Trish and Bernie (Stump) Lonergan, who still live in Yarrawonga. He has two brothers and a sister.

== Statistics ==
Statistics are correct to the end of the 2017 season

Legend
G	Goals	K	Kicks	D	Disposals	T	Tackles
B	Behinds	H	Handballs	M	Marks

Season	Team	No.	Games	Totals							Averages (per game)						
Season	Team	No.	Games	G	B	K	H	D	M	T	G	B	K	H	D	M	T
2005	Geelong	13	4	5	3	13	12	25	12	2	1.3	0.8	3.3	3.0	6.3	3.0	0.5
2006	Geelong	13	3	1	2	17	7	24	12	5	0.3	0.7	5.7	2.3	8.0	4.0	1.7
2008	Geelong	13	16	36	21	121	70	191	87	25	2.3	1.3	7.6	4.4	11.9	5.4	1.6
2009	Geelong	13	9	2	1	40	67	107	36	20	0.2	0.1	4.4	7.4	11.9	4.0	2.2
2010	Geelong	13	22	0	1	99	196	295	109	46	0.0	0.0	4.5	8.9	13.4	5.0	2.1
2011	Geelong	13	21	0	0	99	108	207	80	44	0.0	0.0	4.7	5.1	9.9	3.8	2.1
2012	Geelong	13	22	3	2	144	107	251	98	40	0.1	0.1	6.5	4.9	11.4	4.5	1.8
2013	Geelong	13	25	4	3	104	106	210	85	47	0.2	0.1	4.2	4.2	8.4	3.4	1.9
2014	Geelong	13	23	1	3	136	116	252	97	42	0.0	0.1	5.9	5.0	11.0	4.2	1.8
2015	Geelong	13	19	2	1	162	113	275	119	25	0.1	0.1	8.5	6.0	14.5	6.3	1.3
2016	Geelong	13	22	1	0	162	94	256	98	36	0.1	0.0	7.4	4.3	11.6	4.5	1.6
2017	Geelong	13	23	0	1	153	170	323	99	45	0.0	0.0	6.7	7.4	14.0	4.3	2.0
Career			209	55	38	1250	1166	2416	932	377	0.3	0.2	6.0	5.6	11.6	4.5	1.8
