= List of Hawthorn Football Club coaches =

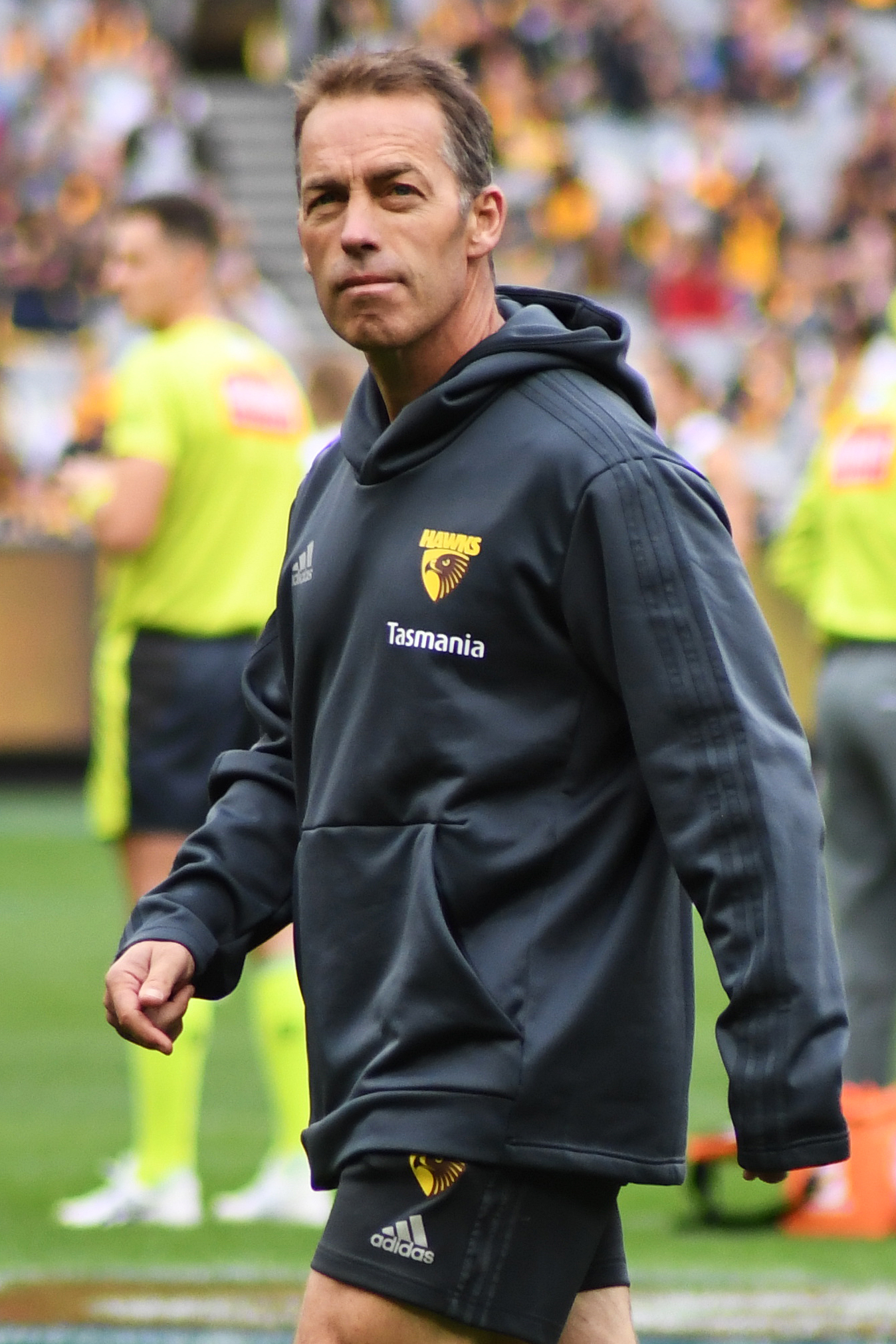
Alastair Clarkson is the most decorated coach in Hawthorn history

The Hawthorn Football Club are a professional Australian rules football team based in Mulgrave, Victoria, playing in the Australian Football League. The team began as the Mayblooms before changing their nickname to the Hawks in 1942.

Since joining the VFA in 1914, Hawthorn have had 33 coaches. The current coach of the club is Sam Mitchell, who took over from Alastair Clarkson ahead of the 2022 season. Clarkson is the most successful coach in the club's history having led the team for more games coached, home and away games coached, games won, home and away wins, finals games, finals wins, and VFL/AFL premierships.

#	Number of coaches
G	Games coached
W	Wins
L	Losses
D	Draws
Win%	Winning percentage

== VFA ==
#	Name	Season(s)	Total					Achievements
#	Name	Season(s)	G	W	L	D	Win%	Achievements
1	Alf Gough	1914–1915	31	4	26	1	12.90	
2	Jack McKenzie	1919	18	8	10	0	44.44	
3	Ted Alley	1920	4	1	3	0	25.00	
4	Arthur Rademacher	1920–1921	31	12	19	0	38.71	
5	Bill Walton	1922–1924	54	31	22	1	57.41	

== VFL/AFL ==
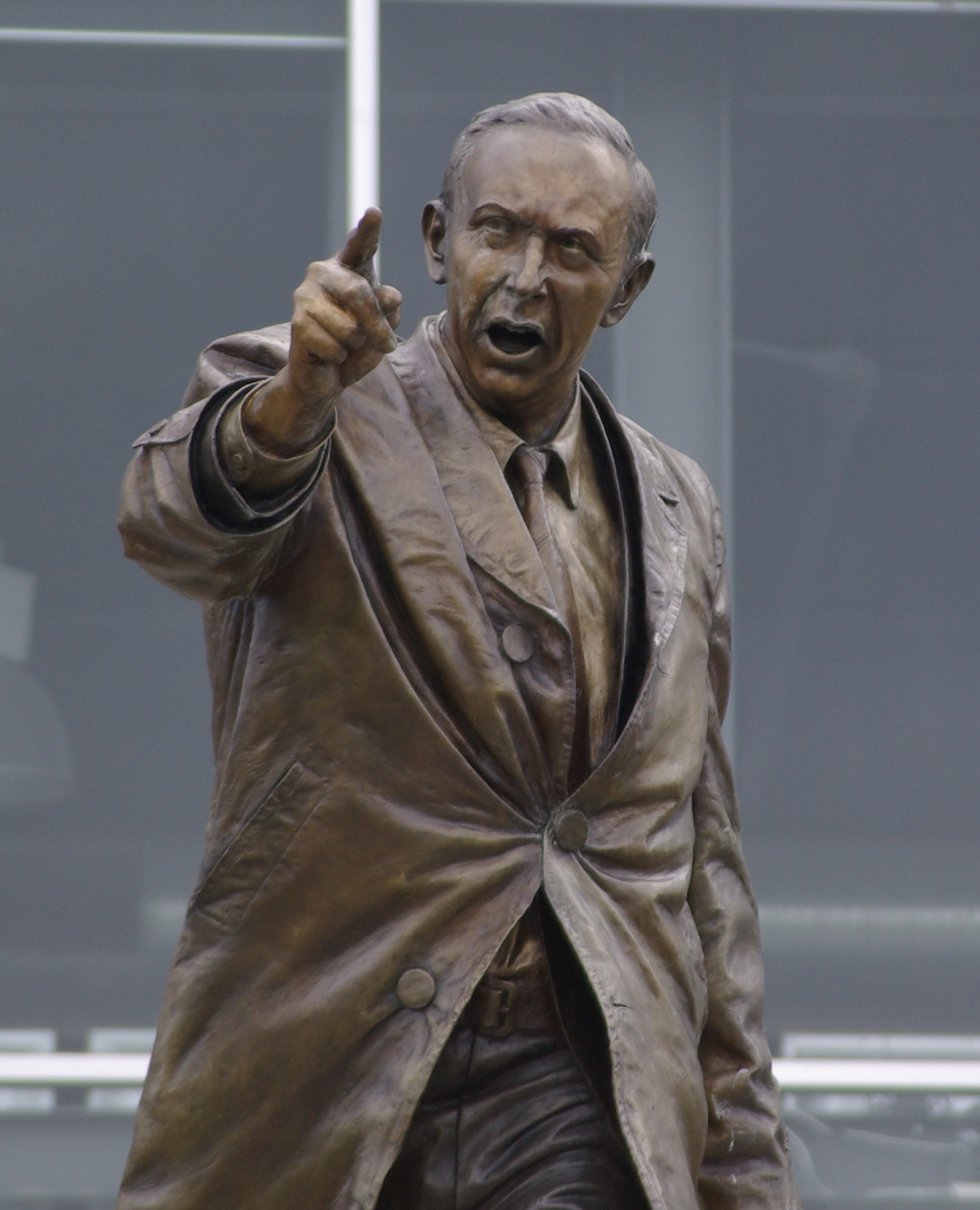
Bronze statue of Kennedy in front of Waverley Park

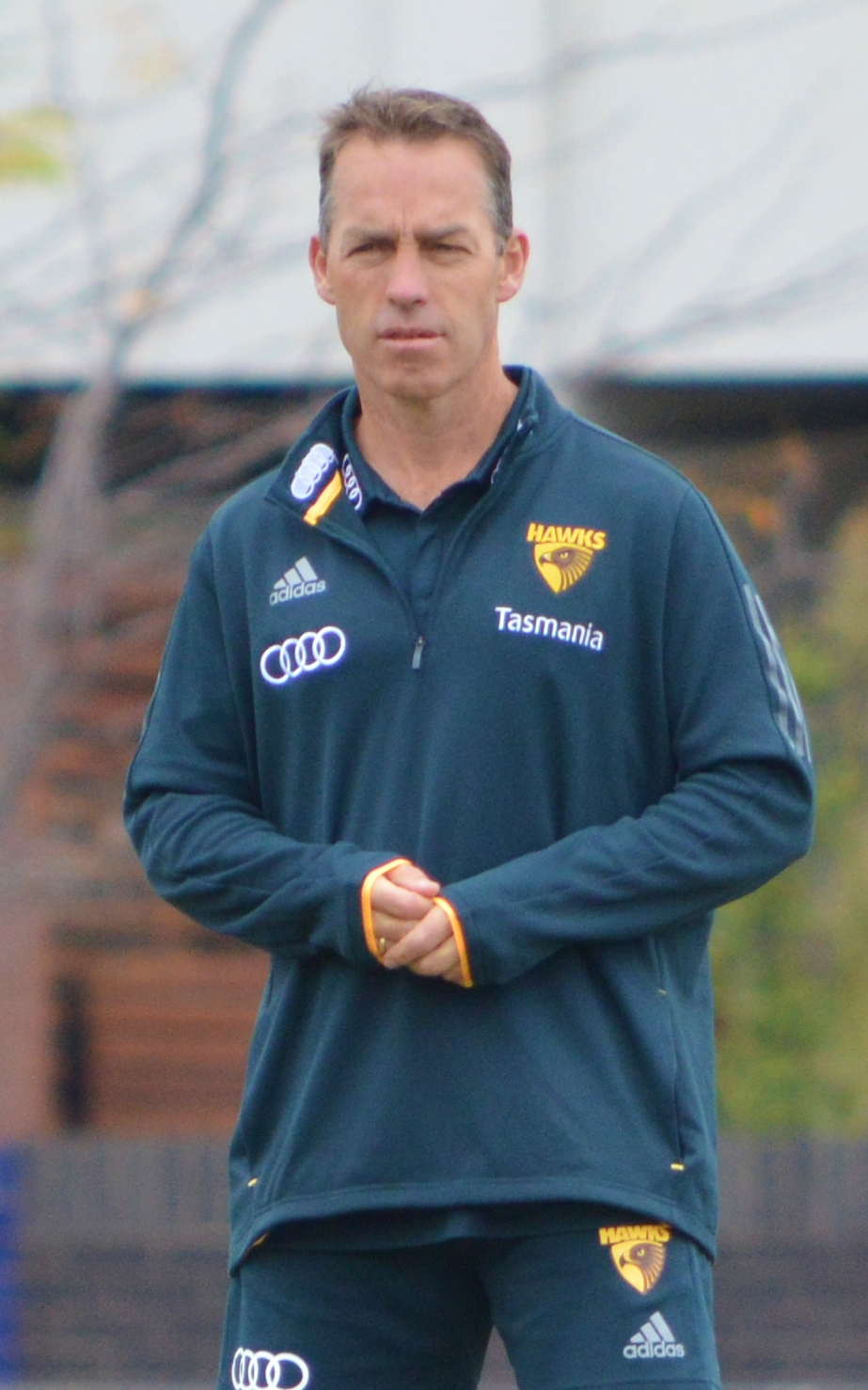
Four time premiership coach Alastair Clarkson in 2017

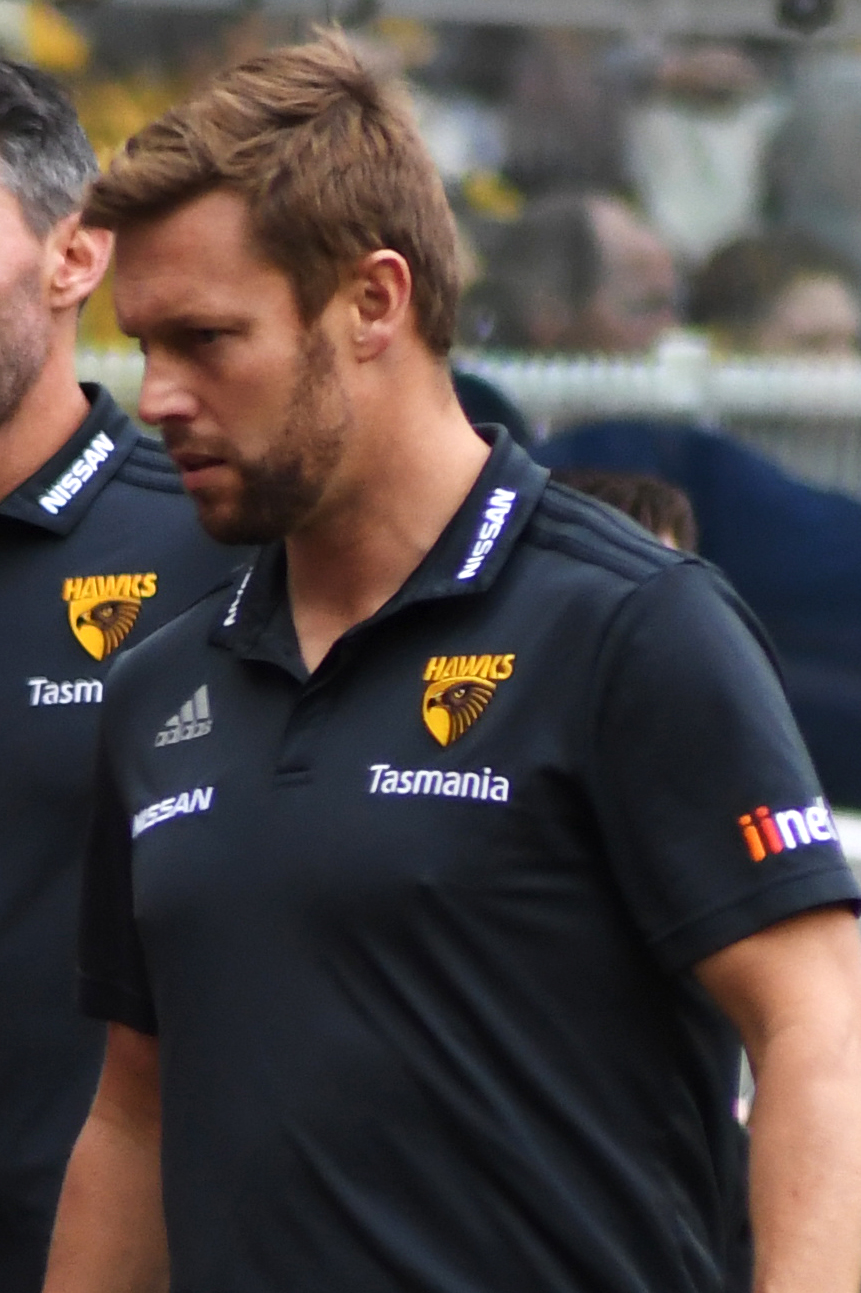
Sam Mitchell current Hawthorn coach

As of the end of 2026

#	Name	Season(s)	Total					Achievements
#	Name	Season(s)	G	W	L	D	Win%	Achievements
6	Alec Hall	1925	17	3	14	0	17.65	
7	Dan Minogue	1926–1927	36	4	31	1	11.11	
8	Bert Sutton	1928	18	0	18	0	0.00	
9	Albert Chadwick	1929	18	4	14	0	22.22	
10	John Harris	1930–1931	36	9	27	0	25.00	
11	Jim Jackson	1932	18	3	15	0	16.67	
12	Fred Phillips	1933	0	0	0	0	—	
–	Arthur Rademacher (interim)	1933	4	1	3	0	25.00	
13	Bill Twomey Sr.	1933–1934	32	5	27	0	15.63	
14	Ivan McAlpine	1935–1938	72	22	50	0	30.56	
15	Len Thomas	1939	18	5	12	1	27.78	
16	Bert Mills	1940–1941	36	10	26	0	27.78	
17	Roy Cazaly	1942–1943	30	10	20	0	33.33	
18	Tommy Lahiff	1944	18	2	15	1	11.11	
19	Keith Shea	1945–1946	39	9	30	0	23.08	
20	Alec Albiston	1947–1949	57	12	45	0	21.05	
21	Bob McCaskill	1950–1951	36	4	32	0	11.11	
22	Jack Hale	1952–1959	146	61	84	1	41.78	
—	John Kennedy Sr. (caretaker)	1957	1	0	1	0	0.00	
23	John Kennedy Sr.	1960–1963	77	46	30	1	59.74	VFL premiership (1961); Jock McHale Medal (1961); 2× Minor premiership (1961, 1963); McClelland Trophy (1961)
24	Graham Arthur	1964–1965	36	17	19	0	47.22	
25	Peter O'Donohue	1966	18	5	13	0	27.78	
—	John Kennedy Sr.	1967–1976	222	135	86	1	60.81	2× VFL premiership (1971, 1976); 2× Jock McHale Medal (1971, 1976); 2× Minor premiership (1971, 1975); McClelland Trophy (1971); 2× Pre-season premiership (1968, 1969)
26	David Parkin	1977–1980	94	57	37	0	60.64	VFL premiership (1978); Jock McHale Medal (1978); Pre-season premiership (1977); NFL Championship (1976)
27	Allan Jeans	1981–1987	174	124	49	1	71.26	2× VFL premiership (1983, 1986); 2× Jock McHale Medal (1983, 1986); Minor premiership (1986); 3× McClelland Trophy (1984, 1985, 1986); 2× Pre-season premiership (1985, 1986); 2× VFL Team of the Year (1983, 1986)
—	Alan Joyce (caretaker)	1988	24	21	3	0	87.50	VFL premiership (1988); Jock McHale Medal (1988); Minor premiership (1988); McClelland Trophy (1988); Pre-season premiership (1988)
—	Allan Jeans	1989–1990	47	35	12	0	74.47	VFL premiership (1989); Jock McHale Medal (1989); Minor premiership (1989)
28	Alan Joyce	1991–1993	69	46	23	0	66.67	AFL premiership (1991); Jock McHale Medal (1991); 2× Pre-season premiership (1991, 1992)
29	Peter Knights	1994–1995	45	20	25	0	44.44	
30	Ken Judge	1996–1999	88	37	50	1	42.05	Pre-season premiership (1999)
31	Peter Schwab	2000–2004	109	52	57	0	47.71	
—	Chris Connolly (caretaker)	2001	1	1	0	0	100.00	
—	Donald McDonald (interim)	2004	5	3	2	0	60.00	
32	Alastair Clarkson	2005–2021	390	228	158	4	58.46	4× AFL premiership (2008, 2013, 2014, 2015); 4× Jock McHale Medal (2008, 2013, 2014, 2015); 2× Minor premiership (2012, 2013); 2× McClelland Trophy (2012, 2013); 4× All-Australian team (2008, 2013, 2014, 2015)
—	Brendon Bolton (caretaker)	2014	5	5	0	0	100.00	
33	Sam Mitchell	2022–	121	63	56	2	52.07	McClelland Trophy (2024)

== AFL Women's ==
On 12 August 2021, Hawthorn was granted a license to join the AFL Women's league for the 2022/23 season. Bec Goddard who was in charge of the club's VFL women's side was immediately appointed as the club's first ever AFLW coach.

As of the end of the 2025 season

#	Name	Season(s)	Total					Awards
#	Name	Season(s)	G	W	L	D	Win%	Awards
1	Bec Goddard	2022 (S7)–2023	20	6	14	0	30.00	
2	Daniel Webster	2024–	27	19	8	0	70.37	McClelland Trophy (2024)
