= John Platten =

Australian rules footballer (born 1963)

Personal information
- Full name: John Patrick Platten
- Born: 17 March 1963 (age 63); Elizabeth, South Australia
- Original team: Central District (SANFL)
- Draft: No. 19, 1981 interstate draft
- Height: 170 cm (5 ft 7 in)
- Weight: 70 kg (154 lb)

Playing career^{1}
Years	Club	Games (Goals)
1981–1985, 1998	Central District	107 (254)
1986–1998	Hawthorn	258 (228)
Total		365 (482)

Representative team honours
Years	Team	Games (Goals)
	South Australia	17 (11)
- ^{1} Playing statistics correct to the end of 1998.

Career highlights
- 4 x VFL/AFL premiership player (1986, 1988, 1989, 1991); 4 × VFL/ AFL night series premiership: 1986, 1988, 1991, 1992; Brownlow Medalist (1987); Magarey Medalist (1984); 2 x Central District best and fairest (1984, 1985); 2 x Hawthorn best and fairest (1987, 1994); 5 x All-Australian team (1985-1988, 1992); 4 x VFL Team of the Year (1986-1989); Australian Football Hall of Fame; South Australian Football Hall of Fame; Hawthorn Team of the Century - (forward pocket); Hawthorn Hall of Fame

John Patrick Platten (born 17 March 1963) is a retired Australian rules footballer.

Platten's career began in the SANFL, where he won a Magarey Medal with Central District, and also with Hawthorn, where he played in four premierships and won the 1987 Brownlow Medal. Platten remains a popular and respected figure at both clubs and is also an inductee in both the AFL and SANFL Halls of Fame.

== Career ==
Platten was born in Elizabeth, South Australia, a northern suburb of Adelaide. He began his career with Central Districts in the SANFL, commencing in the junior ranks in 1979 and making his league debut in 1981.

Platten immediately made an impact with Centrals, becoming a full State Representative in 1982, and continued to be a regular in the state team throughout his career. Platten's greatest achievement at Centrals was his 1984 Magarey Medal win.

Platten was recruited to Carlton but after a protracted legal case eventually joined Hawthorn for the 1986 season. Keeping the number 44 on the back of his guernsey, he went on to play for the Hawks from 1986 to 1997, playing 258 games and kicking 228 goals. Nicknamed "The Rat" because of his diminutive frame and unruly tangle of curly hair, he was a distinctive if unlikely-looking footballer. Despite this, he enjoyed a career that saw him firmly established as one of the best players of the 1980s and early '90s. He was a gutsy rover who won a Brownlow Medal in 1987, tying with Tony Lockett. He played in four VFL/AFL premierships with Hawthorn, in 1986, 1988, 1989, and 1991, and a State of Origin Carnival Championship for South Australia in 1988.

In 1998, Platten retired from Hawthorn and made a dramatic return to Central District along with Gilbert McAdam, another of the Bulldogs' all-time greats. Platten kicked the match-winning goal of his comeback match against Glenelg at Elizabeth Oval, however, injury plagued his long-awaited comeback and he retired from football all together after sustaining a knee injury mid-season. His return to Elizabeth Oval was not the success it was hoped for but was a joyous event for long-time Centrals fans regardless. Platten was a notable attendee at Centrals early 2000s premiership successes, an achievement he was never to enjoy with his boyhood club.

Platten played 107 games for Central District in the SANFL, for a career total of 365 games in elite football, and was also the club's best and fairest in 1984 and 1985, as well as its leading goalkicker in 1981 and 1985. He also won All-Australian selection five times: from 1985 to 1988, when the team was selected based on interstate carnival performances, and in 1992 when the team was selected based on AFL premiership performances.

=== Other matches ===
Platten also played 31 pre-season/night series games - six with Centrals and 25 with Hawthorn (these are considered senior by the SANFL but not the VFL/AFL) - as well as 17 State Of Origin matches for South Australia and six International Rules matches for Australia. If these are considered, Platten played a total of 419 career senior games.

The VFL/AFL lists Platten's total as 394, excluding his pre-season/night series games with Hawthorn.

== Post-playing career ==
Platten also competed in the Gladiator Team Sports Challenge in 1995.

Platten later coached country football in South Australia.

As of 2014, Platten was running his own business called The Safety Hub, specialising in the supply of safety equipment.

== Playing statistics ==
Legend
G	Goals	K	Kicks	D	Disposals	T	Tackles
B	Behinds	H	Handballs	M	Marks

Led the league for the Season only*
Led the league after finals only*
Led the league after Season and Finals*

*10 games required to be eligible.

Season	Team	No.	Games	Totals							Averages (per game)						
Season	Team	No.	Games	G	B	K	H	D	M	T	G	B	K	H	D	M	T
1986	Hawthorn	44	25	31	36	332	175	507	61	—N/a	1.2	1.4	13.3	7.0	20.3	2.4	—N/a
1987	Hawthorn	44	26	33	30	411	222	633	64	49	1.3	1.2	15.8	8.5	24.3	2.5	1.9
1988	Hawthorn	44	22	21	18	383	141	524	56	39	1.0	0.8	17.4	6.4	23.8	2.5	1.8
1989	Hawthorn	44	22	16	22	406	134	540	80	42	0.7	1.0	18.5	6.1	24.5	3.6	1.9
1990	Hawthorn	44	19	19	13	249	76	325	48	20	1.0	0.7	13.1	4.0	17.1	2.5	1.1
1991	Hawthorn	44	23	25	24	390	161	551	56	65	1.1	1.0	17.0	7.0	24.0	2.4	2.8
1992	Hawthorn	44	22	20	16	371	137	508	51	38	0.9	0.7	16.9	6.2	23.1	2.3	1.7
1993	Hawthorn	44	18	15	15	267	95	362	45	43	0.8	0.8	14.8	5.3	20.1	2.5	2.4
1994	Hawthorn	44	23	16	8	333	151	484	67	58	0.7	0.3	14.5	6.6	21.0	2.9	2.5
1995	Hawthorn	44	19	9	9	246	99	345	41	44	0.5	0.5	12.9	5.2	18.2	2.2	2.3
1996	Hawthorn	44	21	9	12	254	117	371	56	54	0.4	0.6	12.1	5.6	17.7	2.7	2.6
1997	Hawthorn	44	18	14	10	208	111	319	56	34	0.8	0.6	11.6	6.2	17.7	3.1	1.9
Career			258	228	213	3850	1619	5469	681	486	0.9	0.8	14.9	6.3	21.2	2.6	2.1

== Honours and achievements ==
**Brownlow Medal votes**
Season	Votes
1986	14
**1987**	**20**
1988	12
1989	20
1990	11
1991	13
1992	11
1993	3
1994	14
1995	5
1996	15
1997	5
**Total**	**143**
Key:
Green / **Bold** = Won

Team

- AFL Premiership (Hawthorn): 1986, 1988, 1989, 1991
- McClelland Trophy (Hawthorn): 1986, 1988, 1989
- Night Premiership (Hawthorn): 1986
- Pre-season Cup (Hawthorn): 1988, 1991, 1992

Individual

- Brownlow Medal: 1987
- All-Australian: 1985, 1986, 1987, 1988, 1992
- Peter Crimmins Medal: 1987, 1994

Other Achievements

- John Platten was one of 113 inaugural inductees into the South Australian Football Hall of Fame in 2002 and in 2003 he was inducted into the Australian Football Hall of Fame.
