= 2001 Ansett Australia Cup =

- Season: 2001
- Teams: 16
- Winners: Port Adelaide (1st title)
- Matches played: 27
- Michael Tuck Medallist: Adam Kingsley (Port Adelaide)

The 2001 Ansett Australia Cup was contested by all sixteen clubs of the Australian Football League prior to the beginning of the 2001 AFL season. It ran for five weeks in February and March 2001. The competition took a round-robin format to provide all teams with at least 3 practice games to prepare for the 2001 regular season, with all clubs divided into four groups of four, and the group winners qualifying for the knockout semi finals. Group A comprised the defending premiers Essendon, Port Adelaide, Geelong and Sydney. Group B featured Kangaroos, Collingwood, West Coast and St Kilda. Group C featured Brisbane Lions, Carlton, Western Bulldogs and Adelaide while finally Group D comprised Hawthorn, Richmond, Fremantle and Melbourne.

In the group stages, the Brisbane Lions, Port Adelaide, Hawthorn and Kangaroos finished top of their respective groups and qualified for the semi-finals. Port Adelaide won Group A with 3 wins out of 3, qualifying ahead of Sydney and Geelong. The win over Geelong that secured Port Adelaide a place in the semi-finals was marred however by a serious broken leg suffered by key ruckman Brendon Lade. In Group B, Kangaroos won their place in the semi-finals after a 28-point win in the final group game against Collingwood. Group C was won by Brisbane Lions after they defeated Carlton by 13 points in the deciding game of the group. Group D was secured by Hawthorn after a 100-point thumping of Melbourne meant they qualified ahead of Richmond on percentage.

In the knockout semi-finals, Brisbane Lions and Port Adelaide beat Hawthorn and Kangaroos respectively to qualify for the Grand Final. Port Adelaide trailed Kangaroos at three-quarter time but kicked the first 5 goals of the final term to secure a 16-point victory in front of their own fans at Football Park. In the other semi-final at Colonial Stadium, the Brisbane Lions kicked the final 4 goals of the game against Hawthorn to win by 15 points. The win by Brisbane Lions was significant. as it broke a finals hoodoo in Melbourne, and it set up the first grand final between two non-Victorian teams in VFL/AFL history.

== Group stage ==
=== Group A ===
	Group A
Friday, 16 February	Geelong 4.10 (34)	def. by	Sydney 6.11 (47)	Marrara Oval (crowd: 8,500)
Saturday, 17 February	Port Adelaide 16.25 (121)	def.	Essendon 5.12 (42)	Football Park (crowd: 19,498)
Friday, 23 February	Port Adelaide 17.10 (112)	def.	Sydney 15.17 (107)	Football Park (crowd: 15,709)
Friday, 23 February	Essendon 12.18 (90)	def. by	Geelong 17.10 (112)	Colonial Stadium (crowd: 22,829)
Saturday, 3 March	Geelong 12.15 (87)	def. by	Port Adelaide 16.9 (105)	Colonial Stadium (crowd: 4,474)
Saturday, 3 March	Sydney 11.17 (83)	def.	Essendon 8.11 (59)	Manuka Oval (crowd: 12,358)

==== Group A Ladder ====
#	Team	P	W	L	D	PF	PA	%	Pts
1	Port Adelaide	3	3	0	0	338	236	143.64	12
2	Sydney	3	2	1	0	237	205	115.61	8
3	Geelong	3	1	2	0	233	242	96.27	4
4	Essendon	3	0	3	0	191	316	60.38	0

=== Group B ===
	Group B
Friday, 16 February	Collingwood 12.14 (86)	def.	St Kilda 10.8 (68)	Colonial Stadium (crowd: 30,072)
Friday, 16 February	West Coast 6.11 (47)	def. by	Kangaroos 14.12 (96)	Subiaco Oval (crowd: 16,905)
Saturday, 24 February	Kangaroos 14.12 (96)	def.	St Kilda 12.9 (81)	Manuka Oval (crowd: 8,157)
Saturday, 24 February	West Coast 12.6 (78)	def. by	Collingwood 12.8 (80)	Subiaco Oval (crowd: 16,090)
Friday, 2 March	St Kilda 19.9 (123)	def.	West Coast 15.7 (97)	Colonial Stadium (crowd: 8,642)
Saturday, 3 March	Kangaroos 18.12 (120)	def.	Collingwood 14.8 (92)	Colonial Stadium (crowd: 28,983)

==== Group B Ladder ====
#	Team	P	W	L	D	PF	PA	%	Pts
1	Kangaroos	3	3	0	0	312	220	141.82	12
2	Collingwood	3	2	1	0	258	241	107.05	8
3	St Kilda	3	1	2	0	272	287	94.75	4
4	West Coast	3	0	3	0	222	316	70.25	0

=== Group C ===
	Group C
Saturday, 17 February	Adelaide 10.13 (73)	def. by	Brisbane Lions 16.18 (114)	Westpac Stadium (crowd: 8,000)
Saturday, 17 February	Western Bulldogs 14.8 (92)	def. by	Carlton 16.10 (106)	Colonial Stadium (crowd: 15,815)
Saturday, 24 February	Carlton 10.12 (72)	def.	Adelaide 9.12 (66)	Optus Oval (crowd: 7,291)
Saturday, 24 February	Brisbane Lions 5.15 (45)	def. by	Western Bulldogs 9.7 (61)	Bundaberg Rum Stadium (crowd: 5,800)
Friday, 2 March	Adelaide 11.11 (77)	def.	Western Bulldogs 9.5 (59)	Football Park (crowd: 20,169)
Saturday, 3 March	Brisbane Lions 10.14 (74)	def.	Carlton 9.7 (61)	Gabba (crowd: 22,957)

==== Group C Ladder ====
#	Team	P	W	L	D	PF	PA	%	Pts
1	Brisbane Lions	3	2	1	0	233	195	119.49	8
2	Carlton	3	2	1	0	252	219	115.05	8
3	Western Bulldogs	3	1	2	0	212	228	93.06	4
4	Adelaide	3	1	2	0	216	245	88.24	4

=== Group D ===
	Group D
Saturday, 17 February	Fremantle 8.9 (57)	def. by	Melbourne 14.14 (98)	Subiaco Oval (crowd: 11,392)
Sunday, 18 February	Hawthorn 13.11 (89)	def.	Richmond 6.9 (45)	York Park (crowd: 13,958)
Sunday, 25 February	Richmond 14.13 (97)	def.	Melbourne 9.11 (65)	Optus Oval (crowd: 7,875)
Sunday, 25 February	Fremantle 10.12 (72)	def.	Hawthorn 5.16 (46)	Subiaco Oval (crowd: 9,193)
Sunday, 4 March	Richmond 22.13 (145)	def.	Fremantle 7.9 (51)	Optus Oval (crowd: 4,391)
Sunday, 4 March	Hawthorn 21.17 (143)	def.	Melbourne 6.7 (43)	Colonial Stadium (crowd: 9,813)

==== Group D Ladder ====
#	Team	P	W	L	D	PF	PA	%	Pts
1	Hawthorn	3	2	1	0	278	181	153.59	8
2	Richmond	3	2	1	0	288	234	123.08	8
3	Melbourne	3	1	2	0	211	274	77.01	4
4	Fremantle	3	1	2	0	180	288	62.50	4

== Knockout Phase ==
=== Semi-finals ===
	Semi-finals
Friday, 9 March (7:40 pm)	Port Adelaide 15.12 (102)	def.	Kangaroos 13.8 (86)	Football Park (crowd: 18,516)
Saturday, 10 March (7:40 pm)	Brisbane Lions 14.10 (94)	def.	Hawthorn 12.7 (79)	Colonial Stadium (crowd: 15,866)

=== Grand final ===
Grand Final
Saturday, 17 March (7:30 pm)	Port Adelaide	def.	Brisbane Lions	Football Park (crowd: 35,304)	Report
1.3 (9); 9.5 (59); 15.6 (96); 17.9 (111)	Q1; Q2; Q3; Final	1.3 (9); 1.3 (9); 3.6 (24); 3.8 (26)	Umpires: Sheehan, Dore, Goldspink; Michael Tuck Medal: Adam Kingsley (Port Adelaide); Television broadcast: Seven Network
Dew 4 C. Cornes 3 K. Cornes, Francis 2 Ackland, P. Burgoyne, J Francou, Guerra, Montgomery, Stevens 1	Goals	2 Bradshaw; 1 Power
Kingsley, Dew, P. Burgoyne, J Francou, Stevens, Primus	Best	Bradshaw, White, Pike
French (leg)	Injuries	Nil
Nil	Reports	C. Scott reported by field umpire Goldspink for striking C. Cornes during the final quarter
The Brisbane Lions (the eventual regular season premiers) were playing in its first grand final of any kind (since the merger with Fitzroy), while Port Adelaide were playing in their second pre-season grand final after going down to Hawthorn back in 1999. The Brisbane Lions were unhappy with the arrangements for the final, as they had to travel interstate for the 4th time in 5 games, while Port Adelaide played their 4th game at home. In the final, Port Adelaide took out their first pre season title with a convincing 85-point thumping of the Brisbane Lions. After an even first 1/4, Port took control in the second term with an 8 goal to 0 blitz, during which Stuart Dew kicked 3 goals in 3 minutes, and comfortably held on to secure the first silverware the club had won since their 1997 entry into the AFL.

== Knockout Chart ==
Semi-finals
Port Adelaide	15	12	102
Kangaroos	13	8	86
Brisbane Lions	14	10	94
Hawthorn	12	7	79

Grand Final
Port Adelaide	17	9	111
Brisbane Lions	3	8	26

== Practice Matches ==
	Weekend 10-11th March
Saturday, 10 March (2:00pm)	Essendon 13.12 (90)	def. by	Melbourne 19.8 (122)	Optus Oval
Saturday, 10 March (2:30pm)	Western Bulldogs 16.16 (112)	def.	Richmond 4.12 (36)	Whitten Oval
Saturday, 10 March (4:00pm)	Sydney 14.9 (93)	def.	Collingwood 11.10 (76)	Newcastle Number 1 Sports Ground (crowd: 5,250)
Saturday, 10 March (5:30pm)	Adelaide 14.12 (96)	def.	West Coast 6.10 (46)	Football Park (crowd: 5,236)
Saturday, 10 March (4:00pm)	Fremantle 9.7 (61)	def. by	Geelong 17.15 (117)	Fremantle Oval (crowd: 4,200 est.)
Sunday, 11 March (2:00pm)	Carlton 12.13 (85)	def. by	St Kilda 13.15 (93)	Queen Elizabeth Oval, Bendigo (crowd: 10,000 est.)

	Weekend of 17th March
Saturday, 17 March (11:00am)	Essendon 9.6 (60)	def.	Richmond 7.8 (50)	Trevor Barker Beach Oval (crowd: 500 est.)
Saturday, 17 March (2:00pm)	Kangaroos 17.10 (112)	def.	Fremantle 7.6 (48)	Optus Oval (crowd: 1,000 est.)
Saturday, 17 March (2:00pm)	Sydney 16.17 (113)	def.	Carlton 13.19 (97)	SCG (crowd: 3,000 est.)
Saturday, 17 March (2:00pm)	Geelong 7.18 (60)	def. by	Hawthorn 9.12 (66)	Hamilton, Victoria (crowd: 4,500 est.)
Saturday, 17 March (2:30pm)	Collingwood 13.9 (87)	def. by	Melbourne 16.9 (105)	North Hobart Oval (crowd: 8,000)
Saturday, 17 March (4:30pm)	Adelaide 4.10 (34)	def. by	St Kilda 11.13 (79)	Port Augusta
Saturday, 17 March (7:00pm)	West Coast 17.11 (113)	def.	Western Bulldogs 7.18 (60)	Subiaco Oval (crowd: 2,500 est.)
The Essendon vs. Richmond match was originally scheduled to be played Friday 16 March (7:00pm) at Lavington Oval, Albury. The match was abandoned due to a torrential thunderstorm, despite approximately 8,000 people still attending the ground. The match was hastily rescheduled for the next morning at Trevor Barker Beach Oval in Sandringham.

== See also ==
- List of VFL/AFL pre-season and night series premiers
- 2001 AFL season
