= 2000 Ansett Australia Cup =

- Season: 2000
- Teams: 16
- Winners: Essendon (4th title)
- Matches played: 27
- Attendance: 325,736 (average 12,064 per match)
- Michael Tuck Medallist: Mark Mercuri (Essendon)

The 2000 AFL Ansett Australia Cup was the Australian Football League pre-season Cup competition played in its entirety before the Australian Football League's 2000 Premiership Season began.

Unlike most pre-season cup competitions that start in February, the 2000 Cup started on 31 December 1999 with a one-off Match of the Millennium between Carlton and Collingwood, most notable for the competition record 12 goals by Brendan Fevola. The competition culminated with the Grand Final in February 2000 between Essendon, the eventual 2000 AFL Premiers, and the Kangaroos, the reigning 1999 AFL Premiers. Essendon's undefeated run through the pre-season was a precursor to their dominance in the premiership season, in which they only lost one match. The final was held in February, rather than March as per most other pre-seasons, due to the season being played earlier in the year so that the finals would not clash with the 2000 Summer Olympics to be held in Sydney in late September.

== Group stage ==
=== Group A ===
	Group A
Friday, 28 January	Brisbane Lions 13.6 (84)	def. by	Sydney 17.10 (112)	Bundaberg Rum Stadium (crowd: 8,818)
Friday, 28 January	Kangaroos 10.16 (76)	def.	Richmond 9.11 (65)	Waverley Park (crowd: 16,512)
Saturday, 5 February	Richmond 11.16 (82)	def. by	Brisbane Lions 15.9 (99)	North Hobart Oval (crowd: 4,908)
Saturday, 5 February	Sydney 13.11 (89)	def. by	Kangaroos 17.10 (112)	Manuka Oval (crowd: 9,854)
Friday, 11 February	Kangaroos 11.8 (74)	def.	Brisbane Lions 10.8 (64)	Waverley Park (crowd: 6,518)
Saturday, 12 February	Sydney 12.14 (86)	def.	Richmond 12.11 (83)	Manuka Oval (crowd: 8,714)

==== Group A Ladder ====
#	Team	P	W	L	D	PF	PA	%	Pts
1	Kangaroos	3	3	0	0	262	218	120.18	12
2	Sydney	3	2	1	0	287	277	103.61	8
3	Brisbane Lions	3	1	2	0	247	250	98.80	4
4	Richmond	3	0	3	0	230	281	81.85	0

=== Group B ===
	Group B
Friday, 31 December 1999	Carlton 20.17 (137)	def.	Collingwood 7.7 (49)	M.C.G. (crowd: 16,678)	Report
Saturday, 29 January	Port Adelaide 13.12 (90)	def.	Collingwood 12.9 (81)	Football Park (crowd: 10,454)
Saturday, 29 January	Carlton 22.14 (146)	def.	Fremantle 9.8 (62)	Waverley Park (crowd: 5,692)
Saturday, 5 February	Fremantle 10.18 (78)	def.	Port Adelaide 10.9 (69)	Subiaco Oval (crowd: 6,119)
Saturday, 12 February	Port Adelaide 12.8 (80)	def.	Carlton 11.10 (76)	Football Park (crowd: 11,132)
Saturday, 12 February	Collingwood 13.14 (92)	def.	Fremantle 3.11 (29)	Waverley Park (crowd: 7,752)

==== Group B Ladder ====
#	Team	P	W	L	D	PF	PA	%	Pts
1	Carlton	3	2	1	0	359	207	173.43	8
2	Port Adelaide	3	2	1	0	239	229	104.37	8
3	Collingwood	3	1	2	0	222	293	75.77	4
4	Fremantle	3	1	2	0	169	260	65.00	4

=== Group C ===
	Group C
Sunday, 30 January	Adelaide 17.5 (107)	def. by	Melbourne 19.11 (125)	Football Park (crowd: 12,239)
Sunday, 30 January	Geelong 10.14 (74)	def. by	St Kilda 11.12 (78)	Waverley Park (crowd: 7,394)
Saturday, 5 February	St Kilda 9.12 (66)	def. by	Melbourne 13.14 (92)	Waverley Park (crowd: 10,533)
Sunday, 6 February	Adelaide 19.10 (124)	def.	Geelong 15.12 (102)	Football Park (crowd: 11,326)
Sunday, 13 February	Adelaide 14.11 (95)	def. by	St Kilda 15.12 (102)	Football Park (crowd: 13,086)
Monday, 14 February	Geelong 17.12 (114)	def.	Melbourne 11.16 (82)	Waverley Park (crowd: 4,952)
The Geelong vs. Melbourne match was originally scheduled to be played on Sunday 13th February at Shell Stadium, but due to a burst water main, the Melbourne Football Club deemed the surface unplayable and refused to play. The AFL rescheduled the match for the following night at Waverley Park.

==== Group C Ladder ====
#	Team	P	W	L	D	PF	PA	%	Pts
1	Melbourne	3	2	1	0	299	303	98.68	8
2	Adelaide	3	2	1	0	326	334	97.60	8
3	St Kilda	3	2	1	0	246	253	97.23	8
4	Geelong	3	1	2	0	300	280	107.14	4

=== Group D ===
	Group D
Friday, 28 January	West Coast 8.10 (58)	def. by	Essendon 11.12 (78)	Marrara Oval (crowd: 13,600)
Saturday, 29 January	Hawthorn 4.14 (38)	def. by	Western Bulldogs 13.7 (85)	Westpac Stadium, Wellington, New Zealand (crowd: 11,666)
Friday, 4 February	Essendon 17.12 (114)	def.	Western Bulldogs 10.21 (81)	Waverley Park (crowd: 11,391)
Sunday, 6 February	Hawthorn 17.14 (116)	def.	West Coast 5.10 (40)	Waverley Park (crowd: 6,872)
Saturday, 12 February	West Coast 19.15 (129)	def.	Western Bulldogs 12.10 (82)	Subiaco Oval (crowd: 9,285)
Sunday, 13 February	Hawthorn 10.16 (76)	def. by	Essendon 19.11 (125)	Waverley Park (crowd: 15,081)

==== Group D Ladder ====
#	Team	P	W	L	D	PF	PA	%	Pts
1	Essendon	3	3	0	0	317	215	147.44	12
2	Western Bulldogs	3	2	1	0	248	292	84.93	8
3	West Coast	3	1	2	0	216	323	66.88	4
4	Hawthorn	3	0	3	0	230	281	81.85	0

== Semi finals ==
	Semi finals
Friday, 18 February	Kangaroos 13.19 (97)	def.	Carlton 11.10 (76)	Waverley Park (crowd: 12,641)
Saturday, 19 February	Melbourne 16.9 (105)	def. by	Essendon 19.17 (131)	Waverley Park (crowd: 16,384)

=== Grand Final ===
2000 Ansett Australia Cup Grand Final
Saturday, 26 February (7:10 pm)	Kangaroos	def. by	Essendon	Melbourne Cricket Ground (crowd: 56,720)
3.1 (19); 4.2 (28); 6.6 (42); 11.10 (76)	Q1; Q2; Q3; Final	3.5 (23); 7.12 (56); 10.17 (77); 16.21 (117)	Umpires: Coates, Allen, McLaren; Michael Tuck Medal: Mark Mercuri (Essendon); Television broadcast: Seven Network
Bell 3; Calchorpe 2, Simpson 2, Scott, Sholl, McKernan, King	Goals	Mercuri 3; Lloyd 2, Alessio 2, Caracella 2, Rioli 2; Solomon, Bewick, J Johnson, Jacobs, McAlister
Bell, Archer, Harvey, Pickett	Best	Fletcher, Mercuri, Barnes, Misiti, Wellman, J Johnson, Solomon
Blakey (concussion), Stevens (ankle)	Injuries	Long (hamstring), withdrawn from selected squad.
Carey (Roos) for allegedly striking Fletcher (Ess) in the first quarter. Martyn (Roos) for allegedly striking Lloyd (Ess) in the second quarter.	Reports

== Practice Matches ==
	Week 19-20th February
Saturday, 19 February	Collingwood 12.6 (78)	def.	West Coast 6.14 (50)	Victoria Park
Saturday, 19 February	Western Bulldogs 14.11 (95)	def.	Fremantle 8.7 (55)	Whitten Oval (crowd: 7,500 est.)
Saturday, 19 February	Richmond 13.11 (89)	def.	Hawthorn 12.12 (84)	Devonport Oval (crowd: 7,114)
Saturday, 19 February	Brisbane Lions 14.17 (101)	def.	St Kilda 10.7 (67)	Giffin Park, Coorparoo
Sunday, 20 February	Sydney 11.11 (77)	def. by	Adelaide 12.10 (82)	Exies Oval, Griffith
Sunday, 20 February	Geelong 14.17 (101)	def.	Port Adelaide 10.7 (67)	Northern Oval, North Ballarat (crowd: 7,000 est.)

	Week 26-27th February
Saturday, 26 February	Sydney 8.12 (60)	def. by	Collingwood 15.14 (104)	Manuka Oval (crowd: 3,500 est.)
Saturday, 26 February	Hawthorn 8.11 (59)	def. by	Carlton 14.9 (93)	Deakin Reserve, Shepparton (crowd: 5,000 est.)
Saturday, 26 February	West Coast 16.21 (117)	def.	Fremantle 15.22 (112)	Subiaco Oval (crowd: 5,000 est.)
Saturday, 26 February	Brisbane Lions 13.11 (89)	def.	Melbourne 10.8 (68)	Fankhauser Reserve, Southport (crowd: 5,000 est.)
Saturday, 26 February	St Kilda 14.11 (95)	def.	Richmond 5.6 (36)	Waverley Park
Sunday, 27 February	Richmond 10.8 (68)	def. by	Geelong 17.14 (116)	North Hobart Oval (crowd: 3,709)
Sunday, 27 February	Adelaide 19.9 (123)	def.	Port Adelaide 16.11 (107)	Encounter Bay Oval, Victor Harbour (crowd: 3,709)

== See also ==
- List of VFL/AFL pre-season and night series premiers
- 2000 AFL season
