= 2005 Wizard Home Loans Cup =

- Season: 2005
- Teams: 16
- Winners: Carlton (3rd title)
- Matches played: 15
- Attendance: 317,761 (average 21,184 per match)
- Michael Tuck Medallist: Brendan Fevola

The 2005 Wizard Home Loans Cup was the name of the AFL pre-season competition for 2005. The attendance for all matches was 317,761, with an average attendance of 21,184 per game. The Michael Tuck medal (awarded to the best & fairest in the pre-season final) was awarded to Brendan Fevola of the Carlton Football Club. Carlton defeated the West Coast Eagles in the final 1.14.18 (111) to 1.11.9 (84). Carlton went on to receive the wooden spoon in the regular home-and-away season.

== Games ==
=== Round 1 ===
	Week 1
Friday, 18 February (7:40pm)	Collingwood 3.12.16 (115)	def.	Richmond 5.9.9 (108)	Telstra Dome (crowd: 33,639)
Friday, 18 February (7:40pm)	Fremantle 0.11.7 (73)	def. by	West Coast 0.12.8 (80)	Subiaco Oval (crowd: 38,124)
Saturday, 19 February (2:40pm)	Western Bulldogs 1.11.15 (90)	def.	Sydney 0.11.4 (70)	Telstra Dome (crowd: 10,580)
Saturday, 19 February (6:10pm)	Hawthorn 1.8.9 (66)	def. by	St Kilda 1.8.18 (75)	Telstra Dome (crowd: 27,513)
Saturday, 19 February (7:10pm)	Brisbane Lions 0.7.11 (53)	def. by	Melbourne 3.10.11 (98)	Cazaly's Stadium (crowd: 9,486)
Sunday, 20 February ((2:40pm)	Kangaroos 0.7.12 (54)	def.	Geelong 0.4.5 (29)	Manuka Oval (crowd: 3,540)
Sunday, 20 February (5:10pm)	Carlton 2.13.11 (107)	def.	Essendon 2.7.10 (70)	Telstra Dome (crowd: 23,220)
Sunday, 20 February (7:10pm)	Adelaide 1.7.9 (60)	def. by	Port Adelaide 0.11.9 (75)	AAMI Stadium (crowd: 26,161)

=== Quarter-finals ===
	Quarter-finals
Friday, 25 February (7:40pm)	St Kilda 1.9.11 (74)	def. by	Western Bulldogs 2.10.7 (85)	Aurora Stadium (crowd: 12,948)
Saturday, 26 February (7:40pm)	Kangaroos 1.15.21 (120)	def.	Port Adelaide 2.9.4 (76)	Telstra Dome (crowd: 10,032)
Saturday, 26 February (8:10pm)	West Coast 1.14.13 (106)	def.	Collingwood 1.7.4 (55)	Marrara Oval (crowd: 10,780)
Sunday, 27 February (5:10pm)	Melbourne 1.12.16 (97)	def. by	Carlton 1.15.8 (107)	Telstra Dome (crowd: 17,249)

=== Semi-finals ===
	Semi-finals
Friday, 4 March (6:40pm)	West Coast 2.15.12 (120)	def.	Kangaroos 0.5.10 (40)	Subiaco Oval (crowd: 25,059)
Saturday, 5 March (7:40pm)	Western Bulldogs 1.11.7 (82)	def. by	Carlton 0.21.7 (133)	Telstra Dome (crowd: 26,039)

=== Grand Final ===
2005 Wizard Home Loans Cup Grand Final
Saturday, 18 March (7:30 pm)	Carlton	def.	West Coast	Telstra Dome (crowd: 43,280)
0.4.2 (26); 0.8.12 (60); 0.10.15 (75); 1.14.18 (111)	Q1; Q2; Q3; Final	1.3.3 (30); 1.4.5 (38); 1.7.6 (57); 1.11.9 (84)	Michael Tuck Medal: Brendan Fevola (Carlton); Television broadcast: Nine Network
Prendergast	Super Goals	Judd
Fevola 8, Whitnall 2, Morrell, McGrath, Camporeale, Scotland	Goals	Lynch 3, Hansen, Gardiner, Banfield 2, Waters, Judd
Fevola, Camporeale, Lappin, Stevens, Whitnall, Livingston, French	Best	Judd, Fletcher, Banfield, Cousins, Gardiner, Wirrpunda
Thornton (knee: 4-6 weeks)	Injuries
Nil	Reports
Carlton was awarded hosting rights for the Grand Final, which was determined by how many goals each winning semi finalists kicked during the competition (49-41).

=== Exhibition Matches ===
	Indigenous All-Stars match
Saturday, 5 February (8:00pm)	Indigenous All-Stars 12.9 (91)	def.	Western Bulldogs 10.3 (63)	Marrara Oval (crowd: 8,281)
Daniel Wells was awarded the Graham 'Polly' Farmer medal for being the Indigenous All-Stars best on ground.

	Practice match
Friday, 11 February (7:00pm)	Sydney 14.12 (94)	def.	Essendon 9.10 (64)	North Sydney Oval (crowd: 9,654)
The match was played with 15 players per side.

=== Wizard Regional Challenge ===
	Week 1
Saturday, 26 February (2:00pm)	Essendon 10.6 (66)	def. by	Richmond 20.18 (138)	Morwell Recreation Reserve (crowd: 12,000 est.)
Saturday, 26 February (2:00pm)	Sydney 4.9 (33)	def. by	Brisbane Lions 12.17 (89)	Telstra Stadium (crowd: 2,200 est.)
Saturday, 26 February (1:45pm)	Adelaide 12.16 (88)	def.	Geelong 13.8 (86)	Centenary Oval (crowd: 7,662)
Saturday, 26 February (3:45pm)	Fremantle 14.12 (96)	def.	Hawthorn 4.8 (32)	Arena Joondalup (crowd: 10,127)

	Week 2
Friday, 4 March (4:00pm)	Hawthorn 15.7 (97)	def. by	Geelong 15.13 (103)	Optus Oval (crowd: 2,763)
Friday, 4 March (7:00pm)	Melbourne 14.9 (93)	def.	St Kilda 12.11 (83)	Lavington Sports Ground (crowd: 12,157)
Friday, 4 March (7:30pm)	Adelaide 9.8 (62)	def.	Sydney 8.13 (61)	AAMI Stadium (crowd: 5,829)
Friday, 4 March (7:30pm)	Fremantle 7.7 (49)	def. by	Richmond 7.9 (51)	Traeger Park (crowd: 7,506)
Saturday, 5 March (2:00pm)	Collingwood 12.9 (81)	def.	Port Adelaide 10.12 (72)	Optus Oval (crowd: 1,500 est.)
Saturday, 5 March (7:00pm)	Brisbane Lions 11.11 (77)	def.	Essendon 9.9 (63)	Carrara Stadium (crowd: 16,591)
The match at Carrara was the first AFL game at the venue since 1992.

	Week 3
Friday, 11 March (4:00pm)	St Kilda 8.13 (61)	def.	Kangaroos 6.10 (46)	Moorabbin Oval (crowd: 4,600 est.)
Friday, 11 March (4:00pm)	Melbourne 16.15 (111)	def.	Adelaide 12.14 (86)	Optus Oval (crowd: 1,002)
Friday, 11 March (3:45pm)	Fremantle 11.11 (77)	def.	Western Bulldogs 11.4 (70)	Subiaco Oval (crowd: 2,124)
Friday, 11 March (7:00pm)	Essendon 12.7 (79)	def. by	Geelong 14.6 (90)	Queen Elizabeth Oval, Bendigo (crowd: 14,000)
Friday, 11 March (7:30pm)	Port Adelaide 15.16 (106)	def.	Hawthorn 10.10 (70)	AAMI Stadium (crowd: 7,787)
Saturday, 12 March (1:30pm)	Sydney 16.7 (103)	def. by	Collingwood 16.9 (105)	Newcastle Number 1 Sports Ground (crowd: 5,002)
Saturday, 12 March (2:00pm)	Richmond 12.13 (85)	def.	Brisbane Lions 6.5 (41)	Optus Oval (crowd: 4,000 est.)

== See also ==
- Australian Football League pre-season competition
- 2005 AFL season
