= 2009 NAB Cup =

- Season: 2009
- Teams: 16
- Winners: Geelong (2nd title)
- Matches played: 15
- Attendance: 282,930 (average 18,862 per match)
- Michael Tuck Medallist: Joel Selwood (Geelong)

The 2009 NAB Cup was the Australian Football League pre-season competition that was played before the Australian Football League's 2009 Premiership season begins. It culminated with the final on 13 March 2009 played between Geelong and Collingwood, which was won by Geelong. The final was originally scheduled for 14 March 2009 but was moved by the AFL so that the match did not clash with the Sound Relief benefit concert for the Victorian bushfires.

== Games ==
=== Round 1 ===
	Round 1
Saturday, 7 February (6:45 pm)	West Coast 3.3.9 (54)	def. by	Collingwood 1.15.17 (116)	Subiaco Oval (crowd: 22,819)	Report
Friday, 13 February (8:40 pm)	Western Bulldogs 1.8.12 (69)	def. by	Essendon 1.8.13 (70)	Telstra Dome (crowd: 35,123)	Report
Saturday, 14 February (7:40 pm)	Brisbane Lions 1.8.8 (65)	def.	St Kilda 0.8.8 (56)	Gold Coast Stadium (crowd: 6,013)	Report
Sunday, 15 February (6:40 pm)	Fremantle 5.5.11 (86)	def. by	Richmond 1.12.8 (89)	Subiaco Oval (crowd: 14,517)	Report
Friday, 20 February (7:40 pm)	Carlton 1.17.12 (123)	def.	North Melbourne 0.11.4 (70)	Telstra Dome (crowd: 24,711)	Report
Saturday, 21 February (4:10 pm)	Hawthorn 0.11.3 (69)	def.	Melbourne 1.8.9 (66)	Aurora Stadium (crowd: 8,122)	Report
Saturday, 21 February (7:10 pm)	Geelong 1.17.8 (119)	def.	Adelaide 2.9.12 (84)	Telstra Dome (crowd: 10,320)	Report
Sunday, 22 February (3:40 pm)	Sydney 1.10.9 (78)	def. by	Port Adelaide 4.16.11 (143)	Manuka Oval (crowd: 5,391)	Report
The game between the Western Bulldogs and Essendon was originally scheduled to be played at TIO Stadium, but was relocated so the match could be used as a fundraiser for the victims of the Black Saturday bushfires.

=== Round 2 ===
	Round 2
Thursday, 26 February (7:10 pm)	Collingwood 1.13.10 (97)	def.	Richmond 2.3.15 (51)	Telstra Dome (crowd: 37,121)	Report
Friday, 27 February (7:40 pm)	Essendon 0.9.13 (67)	def.	Brisbane Lions 1.7.14 (65)	Telstra Dome (crowd: 12,260)	Report
Saturday, 28 February (3:10 pm)	Port Adelaide 1.6.9 (54)	def. by	Geelong 0.11.6 (72)	AAMI Stadium (crowd: 8,341)	Report
Sunday, 1 March (4:40 pm)	Carlton 2.13.16 (112)	def.	Hawthorn 2.10.10 (88)	Etihad Stadium (crowd: 19,111)	Report
The quarter final between Collingwood and Richmond which was originally scheduled for 28 February, was moved due to a ground clash with the 2009 A-League Grand Final.

=== Round 3 ===
	Round 3
Friday, 6 March (7:40 pm)	Collingwood 1.17.5 (116)	def.	Essendon 3.6.10 (73)	Etihad Stadium (crowd: 26,154)	Report
Saturday, 7 March (7:10 pm)	Geelong 2.9.12 (84)	def.	Carlton 0.9.13 (67)	Etihad Stadium (crowd: 15,305)	Report

=== Grand Final ===
2009 NAB Cup Grand Final
Friday, 13 March (7:40 pm)	Collingwood	def. by	Geelong	Etihad Stadium (crowd: 37,277)	Report
1.2.2 (23); 1.2.3 (24); 1.4.5 (38); 1.6.6 (51)	Q1; Q2; Q3; Final	0.3.5 (23); 0.9.10 (64); 0.13.17 (95); 0.18.19 (127)	Umpires: McLaren, Jeffery, Donlon, M. Nicholls; Michael Tuck Medal: Joel Selwood (Geelong); Television broadcast: Seven Network
Bryan	Super Goals
Thomas 2, Clarke, O'Bree, Beams, Cloke	Goals	Ablett 5, S. Johnson 4, Selwood 3, Chapman 3, Lonergan 3, Stokes 3, Gamble, Varcoe
Cox, Thomas, Lockyer, Pendlebury	Best	Selwood, Ablett, Chapman, Taylor, S. Johnson, Bartel
Injuries	Josh Hunt (knee)
Nil	Reports	Nil

== Results ==
Round 1
West Coast	54
Collingwood	116
Western Bulldogs	69
Essendon	70
Brisbane Lions	65
St Kilda	56
Fremantle	86
Richmond	89
Carlton	123
North Melbourne	70
Hawthorn	69
Melbourne	66
Geelong	119
Adelaide	84
Sydney	78
Port Adelaide	143

Round 2
Collingwood	97
Richmond	51
Essendon	67
Brisbane Lions	65
Port Adelaide	54
Geelong	72
Carlton	112
Hawthorn	88

Round 3
Collingwood	116
Essendon	73
Geelong	84
Carlton	67

Grand Final
Collingwood	51
Geelong	127

== NAB Challenge ==
	Week 1
Friday, 27 February	St Kilda 8.13 (61)	def.	Western Bulldogs 5.5 (35)	Visy Park (crowd: 1,200)
Friday, 27 February	West Coast 15.5 (95)	def.	Adelaide 12.13 (85)	Traeger Park
Saturday, 28 February	North Melbourne 23.11 (149)	def.	Fremantle 8.4 (52)	Manuka Oval (crowd: 1,661)
Saturday, 28 February	Melbourne 8.7 (55)	def. by	Sydney 9.9 (63)	Visy Park (crowd: 2,000)

	Week 2
Friday, 6 March	Brisbane Lions 4.12 (36)	def. by	Melbourne 11.7 (73)	Cazaly's Stadium (crowd: 4,000)
Friday, 6 March	St Kilda 16.13 (109)	def.	Richmond 9.3 (57)	Deakin Reserve, Shepparton (crowd: 7,000)
Saturday, 7 March	Sydney 16.12 (108)	def.	Western Bulldogs 12.9 (81)	Bruce Purser Reserve, Rouse Hill (crowd: 3,600)
Saturday, 7 March	Adelaide 15.10 (100)	def.	Hawthorn 5.3 (33)	Berri Oval, Berri, South Australia
Saturday, 7 March	Fremantle 17.9 (111)	def.	West Coast 16.10 (106)	Subiaco Oval (crowd: 20,002)
Saturday, 7 March	North Melbourne 11.13 (79)	def. by	Port Adelaide 17.14 (116)	Visy Park

	Week 3
Friday, 13 March	Hawthorn 13.21 (99)	def.	West Coast 8.13 (61)	Visy Park
Friday, 13 March	Port Adelaide 17.11 (113)	def.	St Kilda 9.5 (59)	AAMI Stadium (crowd: 4,000)
Friday, 13 March	Adelaide 15.10 (100)	def.	Sydney 11.9 (75)	AAMI Stadium (crowd: 7,626)
Friday, 13 March	North Melbourne 17.14 (116)	def.	Essendon 15.10 (100)	Queen Elizabeth Oval, Bendigo (crowd: 2,500)
Friday, 13 March	Brisbane Lions 11.4 (70)	def. by	Richmond 12.13 (85)	Carrara Stadium (crowd: 4,369)
Saturday, 14 March	Melbourne 10.3 (63)	def. by	Western Bulldogs 14.17 (101)	Casey Fields (crowd: 2,500)
Saturday, 14 March	Fremantle 20.6 (126)	def.	Carlton 12.11 (83)	Hands Oval, Bunbury (crowd: 5,000)

== See also ==
- 2009 AFL season
