= 2011 NAB Cup =

- Season: 2011
- Teams: 18
- Winners: Collingwood (1st title)
- Matches played: 25
- Attendance: 518,572 (average 20,743 per match)
- Michael Tuck Medallist: Heath Shaw (Collingwood)

The 2011 NAB Cup was the Australian Football League (AFL) pre-season competition played before the 2011 season. The games were played between 11 February and 11 March. The first match was between Adelaide and Melbourne in Adelaide at AAMI Stadium.

This was the first time since 2003 that the competition format had changed. With the introduction of the Gold Coast Football Club and Greater Western Sydney Giants (the latter required to make the competition feature a manageable 18 teams), the format for the 2011 NAB Cup was as follows:

- Weeks 1 and 2: The eighteen teams are split into six pools of three teams each. The three teams in each pool play each other in games of two 20-minute halves, with all three games being played over a three-hour period at the one venue.
- Week 3: The first ranked teams from each pool progress to the quarter-finals, with the two next best ranked teams joining them, allowing an eight team quarter-finals weekend.
- Week 4: The winners from the quarter-finals progress to the semi-finals.
- Week 5: The two winners of the semi-finals progress to the NAB Cup Grand Final.

== Games ==
The first round fixtures were announced by the AFL on 26 October 2010.

=== Round 1 ===
	Pool 1
Friday, 11 February (7:15 pm)	Adelaide 0.3.6 (24)	def. by	Melbourne 0.5.4 (34)	AAMI Stadium (crowd: 18,202)	Report
Friday, 11 February (8:20 pm)	Melbourne 0.5.6 (36)	def.	Port Adelaide 1.2.6 (27)	AAMI Stadium (crowd: 18,202)	Report
Friday, 11 February (9:25 pm)	Adelaide 0.6.4 (40)	def.	Port Adelaide 0.1.2 (8)	AAMI Stadium (crowd: 18,202)	Report

	Pool 2
Saturday, 12 February (7:15 pm)	Carlton 0.6.5 (41)	def.	Richmond 0.3.5 (23)	Etihad Stadium (crowd: 40,300)	Report
Saturday, 12 February (8:20 pm)	Richmond 0.1.1 (7)	def. by	Collingwood 0.7.8 (50)	Etihad Stadium (crowd: 40,300)	Report
Saturday, 12 February (9:25 pm)	Carlton 0.3.8 (26)	def. by	Collingwood 0.5.3 (33)	Etihad Stadium (crowd: 40,300)	Report

	Pool 3
Sunday, 13 February (4:45 pm)	West Coast 0.5.1 (31)	def.	Hawthorn 0.4.5 (29)	Patersons Stadium (crowd: 25,776)	Report
Sunday, 13 February (5:50 pm)	Hawthorn 1.4.4 (37)	def.	Fremantle 0.3.5 (23)	Patersons Stadium (crowd: 25,776)	Report
Sunday, 13 February (6:55 pm)	West Coast 0.5.7 (37)	def.	Fremantle 0.4.1 (25)	Patersons Stadium (crowd: 25,776)	Report

	Pool 4
Friday, 18 February (7:15 pm)	Essendon 1.11.1 (76)	def.	Brisbane Lions 0.2.2 (14)	Etihad Stadium (crowd: 24,158)	Report
Friday, 18 February (8:20 pm)	Brisbane Lions 0.2.3 (15)	def. by	St Kilda 1.5.5 (44)	Etihad Stadium (crowd: 24,158)	Report
Friday, 18 February (9:25 pm)	Essendon 0.5.8 (38)	drew with	St Kilda 0.6.2 (38)	Etihad Stadium (crowd: 24,158)	Report

	Pool 5
Saturday, 19 February (7:15 pm)	Greater Western Sydney 0.0.4 (4)	def. by	Sydney 0.13.5 (83)	Blacktown ISP Oval (crowd: 9,447)	Report
Saturday, 19 February (8:20 pm)	Sydney 0.3.4 (22)	def. by	Gold Coast 0.4.1 (25)	Blacktown ISP Oval (crowd: 9,447)	Report
Saturday, 19 February (9:25 pm)	Greater Western Sydney 0.4.3 (27)	def. by	Gold Coast 0.8.4 (52)	Blacktown ISP Oval (crowd: 9,447)	Report

	Pool 6
Sunday, 20 February (3:45 pm)	Geelong 0.4.8 (32)	def.	North Melbourne 0.2.2 (14)	Skilled Stadium (crowd: 13,232)	Report
Sunday, 20 February (4:50 pm)	North Melbourne 1.2.2 (23)	def. by	Western Bulldogs 0.8.6 (54)	Skilled Stadium (crowd: 13,232)	Report
Sunday, 20 February (5:55 pm)	Geelong 0.7.4 (46)	def.	Western Bulldogs 0.4.1 (25)	Skilled Stadium (crowd: 13,232)	Report

=== Round 2 ===
	Round 2
Thursday, 24 February (7:10 pm)	Melbourne 1.11.7 (82)	def. by	Essendon 1.17.10 (121)	Etihad Stadium (crowd: 13,863)	Report
Friday, 25 February (7:40 pm)	Collingwood 1.12.12 (93)	def.	Sydney 1.10.10 (79)	Etihad Stadium (crowd: 10,773)	Report
Saturday, 26 February (7:10 pm)	Geelong 1.6.6 (51)	def. by	St Kilda 1.15.7 (106)	Etihad Stadium (crowd: 9,670)	Report
Sunday, 27 February (4:40 pm)	West Coast 0.12.15 (87)	def.	Gold Coast 1.5.11 (50)	Patersons Stadium (crowd: 12,625)	Report

=== Round 3 ===
	Round 3
Friday, 4 March (7:40 pm)	Essendon 0.12.12 (84)	def.	St Kilda 0.6.9 (45)	Etihad Stadium (crowd: 17,632)	Report
Saturday, 5 March (5:40 pm)	West Coast 0.8.8 (56)	def. by	Collingwood 1.9.17 (80)	Patersons Stadium (crowd: 15,360)	Report

=== Grand Final ===
2011 NAB Cup Grand Final
Friday, 11 March (7:45 pm)	Essendon	def. by	Collingwood	Etihad Stadium (crowd: 45,304)	Report
0.2.2 (14); 0.3.4 (22); 0.9.5 (59); 0.13.8 (86)	Q1; Q2; Q3; Final	0.3.4 (22); 0.7.6 (48); 1.11.7 (82); 1.15.9 (108)	Umpires: Rosebury, Stevic, Nicholls, Jennings; Michael Tuck Medal: Heath Shaw; Television broadcast: Seven Network
Super Goals	Buckley 1
Hurley, Monfries 3 Ryder, Watson, Zaharakis 2 Hocking 1	Goals	Krakouer, Dawes 3 Cloke 2 Ball, Beams, McCarthy, Pendlebury, Swan, Thomas, Wellingham 1
Hardingham (groin)	Injuries	Nil
By winning this NAB Cup Collingwood became the first team since their opponent Essendon, in 1993/1994, to win a pre-season premiership after winning the previous years' grand final. This was also just Collingwood's second pre-season premiership, the previous one coming in 1979.; This is Collingwood's first pre-season premiership in 32 years, which coincidentally was the same number of years difference between VFL/AFL premiership wins when they defeated Essendon in 1990.

== NAB Challenge ==
On 16 December 2010, the AFL announced the towns that will play host to the NAB Challenge competition. In week 1, the Adelaide suburb of Thebarton hosted an AFL pre-season game for the first time at Thebarton Oval where SANFL team Woodville-West Torrens plays. Traeger Park in Alice Springs, Manuka Oval, Visy Park and Skilled Stadium also hosted matches. Week 2 saw matches played at Lavington for the first time since 2006 as well as games at Southport, Bunbury, Shepparton, Visy Park and AAMI Stadium. In the final week of the competition, matches were played at Coffs Harbour, North Ballarat, Southport, Willaston near Gawler (SA), Fremantle, Aurora Stadium and Visy Park.

	Week 1
Friday, 25 February (7:00 pm)	Port Adelaide 13.11 (89)	def. by	Richmond 14.8 (92)	Traeger Park	Report
Saturday, 26 February (1:00 pm)	Hawthorn 15.9 (99)	def.	North Melbourne 10.10 (70)	Skilled Stadium	Report
Saturday, 26 February (1:00 pm)	Western Bulldogs 20.8 (128)	def.	Brisbane Lions 8.10 (58)	Visy Park	Report
Saturday, 26 February (3:30 pm)	Adelaide 22.9 (141)	def.	Fremantle 10.6 (66)	Thebarton Oval (crowd: 4,721)	Report
Saturday, 26 February (4:00 pm)	Greater Western Sydney 4.2 (26)	def. by	Carlton 29.9 (183)	Manuka Oval (crowd: 5,991)	Report

	Week 2
Friday, 4 March (4:00 pm)	Carlton 15.10 (100)	def.	Adelaide 11.10 (76)	Visy Park (crowd: 3,000 est.)	Report
Friday, 4 March (7:00 pm)	Hawthorn 12.17 (89)	def.	Richmond 7.6 (48)	Deakin Reserve, Shepparton (crowd: 6,108)	Report
Friday, 4 March (7:00 pm)	Port Adelaide 19.21 (135)	def.	Geelong 7.9 (51)	AAMI Stadium (crowd: 4,110)	Report
Saturday, 5 March (12:00 pm)	Melbourne 12.6 (78)	def. by	Brisbane Lions 16.11 (107)	Visy Park (crowd: 3,000 est.)	Report
Saturday, 5 March (3:00 pm)	Gold Coast 3.5 (23)	def. by	Sydney 14.11 (95)	Fankhauser Reserve (crowd: 2,859)	Report
Saturday, 5 March (3:30 pm)	Fremantle 9.14 (68)	def. by	Western Bulldogs 14.14 (98)	Hands Oval (crowd: 4,000 est.)	Report
Saturday, 5 March (7:00 pm)	Greater Western Sydney 8.2 (50)	def. by	North Melbourne 18.15 (123)	Lavington Oval (crowd: 6,122)	Report

	Week 3
Friday, 11 March (4:00 pm)	Richmond 8.6 (54)	def. by	Adelaide 18.14 (122)	Visy Park (crowd: 2,000 est.)	Report
Friday, 11 March (7:00 pm)	Hawthorn 15.14 (104)	def.	Melbourne 12.3 (75)	Aurora Stadium (crowd: 4,010)	Report
Saturday, 12 March (11:00 am)	Fremantle 13.12 (90)	def.	West Coast 11.15 (81)	Fremantle Oval (crowd: 6,583)	Report
Saturday, 12 March (1:00 pm)	North Melbourne 18.10 (118)	def.	Western Bulldogs 16.9 (105)	Eureka Stadium (crowd: 7,000)	Report
Saturday, 12 March (1:00 pm)	Carlton 11.15 (81)	def. by	Geelong 14.8 (92)	Visy Park (crowd: 8,000)	Report
Saturday, 12 March (4:00 pm)	Port Adelaide 21.13 (139)	def.	Greater Western Sydney 6.8 (44)	Willaston Oval, Willaston, South Australia (crowd: 4,164)	Report
Saturday, 12 March (7:00 pm)	Sydney 12.12 (84)	def.	St Kilda 8.5 (53)	BCU International Stadium, Coffs Harbour (crowd: 4,827)	Report
Sunday, 13 March (3:00 pm)	Gold Coast 7.12 (54)	def. by	Brisbane Lions 17.20 (122)	Fankhauser Reserve (crowd: 4,053)	Report

== See also ==
- 2011 AFL season
