= 1993 Foster's Cup =

- AFL pre-season competition
- Season: 1993
- Teams: 15
- Winners: Essendon (2nd title)
- Matches played: 14
- Attendance: 215,351 (average 15,382 per match)
- Michael Tuck Medallist: Gavin Wanganeen (Essendon)

The 1993 AFL Foster's Cup was the Australian Football League pre-season cup competition played in its entirety before the 1993 season began.

== Games ==
=== 1st Round ===
Home team	Home team score	Away team	Away team score	Ground	Crowd	Date
Richmond	22.15 (147)	Sydney	10.7 (67)	Lavington Oval	7,062	Saturday, 13 February
Carlton	9.18 (72)	Footscray	10.14 (74)	Waverley Park	20,019	Saturday, 13 February
Fitzroy	15.9 (99)	Geelong	13.9 (87)	Waverley Park	6,423	Sunday, 14 February
Collingwood	8.13 (61)	Melbourne	9.11 (65)	Princes Park	11,665	Wednesday, 17 February
St Kilda	10.11 (71)	West Coast	16.15 (111)	Subiaco Oval	—	Saturday, 20 February
North Melbourne	5.6 (36)	Adelaide	27.21 (183)	Football Park	24,234	Wednesday, 24 February
Essendon	16.17 (113)	Brisbane	11.10 (76)	Kardinia Park	3,929	Saturday, 27 February

=== Quarter-finals ===
Home team	Home team score	Away team	Away team score	Ground	Crowd	Date
Footscray	13.12 (90)	Fitzroy	13.17 (95)	Kardinia Park	4,179	Sunday, 28 February
Hawthorn	11.7 (73)	Richmond	17.11 (113)	Waverley Park	16,288	Wednesday, 3 March
Melbourne	5.9 (39)	West Coast	11.9 (75)	Waverley Park	7,276	Saturday, 6 March
Adelaide	13.10 (88)	Essendon	16.11 (107)	Waverley Park	6,867	Sunday, 7 March

=== Semi-finals ===
Home team	Home team score	Away team	Away team score	Ground	Crowd	Date
Fitzroy	14.8 (92)	Richmond	15.8 (98)	Waverley Park	18,683	Wednesday, 10 March
West Coast	9.7 (61)	Essendon	12.9 (81)	Waverley Park	13,193	Saturday, 13 March

=== Final ===
Home team	Home team score	Away team	Away team score	Ground	Crowd	Date
Richmond	11.13 (79)	Essendon	14.18 (102)	Waverley Park	75,533	Saturday, 20 March

== See also ==
- List of Australian Football League night premiers
- 1993 AFL season
