= 1987 Brownlow Medal =

- Date: Monday, 21 September 1987
- Location: Ballroom, Hyatt on Collins
- Hosted by: Peter Landy
- Winners: Tony Lockett (St Kilda); John Platten (Hawthorn) (20 votes)

Television/radio coverage
- Network: Seven Network

The 1987 Brownlow Medal was the 60th year the award was presented to the player adjudged the fairest and best player during the Victorian Football League (VFL) home-and-away season. Tony Lockett of the St Kilda Football Club and John Platten of the Hawthorn Football Club both won the medal by polling twenty votes during the 1987 VFL season.

The Count was notable for being the first use of the theme from The Untouchables as the winner's theme, which has subsequently been used every year since.

It remains the first and only time a full-forward (Lockett) won the award in the history of the medal.

== Leading vote-getters ==
	Player	Votes
=1st	Tony Lockett (St Kilda)	20
=1st	John Platten (Hawthorn)	20
=3rd	Paul Meldrum (Carlton)	15
=3rd	Brian Royal (Footscray)	15
=5th	Craig Bradley (Carlton)	14
=5th	Michael Tuck (Hawthorn)	14
=5th	Stephen Kernahan (Carlton)	14
	Greg Williams (Sydney)*	13
=9th	Brian Wilson (Melbourne)	12
=9th	Mark Naley (Carlton)	12

* The player was ineligible to win the medal due to suspension by the VFL Tribunal during the year.
