= 2002 Wizard Home Loans Cup =

- Wizard Cup Logo
- Season: 2002
- Teams: 16
- Winners: Port Adelaide (2nd title)
- Matches played: 27
- Attendance: 337,983 (average 12,518 per match)
- Michael Tuck Medallist: Nick Stevens (Port Adelaide)

The 2002 Wizard Home Loans Cup was the Australian Football League competition played in its entirety before the Australian Football League's 2002 Premiership Season began. The AFL National Cup is also sometimes referred to as the pre-season cup because it is played in its entirety before the Premiership Season begins. Teams were split into 4 groups, each comprising 4 teams. Each team would play the other three teams in its group once, with the winners of the four groups advancing to the semi-finals. Port Adelaide won their second pre-season cup defeating Richmond in the final.

== Groups ==
Group 1	Hawthorn	Collingwood	Kangaroos	Sydney
Group 2	Fremantle	Western Bulldogs	Port Adelaide	Essendon
Group 3	Geelong	Richmond	West Coast	Carlton
Group 4	St. Kilda	Melbourne	Brisbane	Adelaide

== Games ==
=== Round 1 ===
	Round 1
Friday, 15 February	St Kilda 16.13 (109)	def.	Melbourne 5.11 (41)	Colonial Stadium (crowd: 13,814)
Friday, 15 February	Fremantle 13.9 (87)	def.	Western Bulldogs 10.8 (68)	Subiaco Oval (crowd: 13,304)
Saturday, 16 February	Geelong 12.7 (79)	def.	Richmond 7.13 (55)	Baytec Stadium (crowd: 11,531)
Saturday, 16 February	Carlton 12.9 (81)	def. by	West Coast 17.14 (116)	Optus Oval (crowd: 5,217)
Saturday, 16 February	Brisbane Lions 14.7 (91)	def. by	Adelaide 14.9 (93)	Gabba (crowd: 17,236)
Sunday, 17 February	Hawthorn 13.10 (88)	def.	Kangaroos 9.13 (67)	York Park (crowd: 12,861)
Sunday, 17 February	Sydney 18.11 (119)	def.	Collingwood 5.9 (39)	Manuka Oval (crowd: 7,826)
Sunday, 17 February	Port Adelaide 13.8 (86)	def.	Essendon 8.10 (58)	Football Park (crowd: 15,576)

=== Round 2 ===
	Round 2
Friday, 22 February	Brisbane Lions 12.8 (80)	def.	Melbourne 10.11 (71)	Bundaberg Rum Stadium (crowd: 13,814)
Friday, 22 February	West Coast 7.11 (53)	def. by	Richmond 11.12 (78)	Subiaco Oval (crowd: 17,646)
Saturday, 23 February	Carlton 13.10 (88)	def.	Geelong 11.10 (76)	Optus Oval (crowd: 5,069)
Saturday, 23 February	Essendon 12.16 (88)	def. by	Western Bulldogs 18.8 (116)	Colonial Stadium (crowd: 12,445)
Saturday, 23 February	Port Adelaide 17.14 (116)	def.	Fremantle 7.8 (50)	Football Park (crowd: 10,234)
Sunday, 24 February	Kangaroos 16.8 (104)	def.	Sydney 11.17 (83)	Manuka Oval (crowd: 7,826)
Sunday, 24 February	Adelaide 17.11 (113)	def.	St Kilda 11.11 (77)	Football Park (crowd: 14,351)
Sunday, 24 February	Hawthorn 12.13 (85)	def.	Collingwood 10.8 (68)	Colonial Stadium (crowd: 13,795)

=== Round 3 ===
	Round 3
Friday, 1 March	Richmond 14.13 (97)	def.	Carlton 10.11 (71)	Colonial Stadium (crowd: 16,375)
Friday, 1 March	West Coast 14.14 (98)	def.	Geelong 12.12 (84)	Subiaco Oval (crowd: 13,049)
Saturday, 2 March	Western Bulldogs 10.12 (72)	def. by	Port Adelaide 16.17 (113)	Colonial Stadium (crowd: 5,391)
Saturday, 2 March	Brisbane Lions 17.6 (108)	def.	St Kilda 7.11 (53)	Gabba (crowd: 13,025)
Saturday, 2 March	Fremantle 13.10 (88)	def.	Essendon 8.7 (55)	Subiaco Oval (crowd: 11,228)
Sunday, 3 March	Hawthorn 8.9 (57)	def. by	Sydney 15.9 (99)	Optus Oval (crowd: 4,208)
Sunday, 3 March	Adelaide 22.10 (142)	def.	Melbourne 4.11 (35)	Football Park (crowd: 16,122)
Sunday, 3 March	Collingwood 9.13 (67)	def. by	Kangaroos 19.13 (127)	Colonial Stadium (crowd: 11,455)

== Ladders ==
=== Group 1 ===
	Team	Won	Lost	Draw	For	Against	%	Points
1	Sydney	2	1	0	301	200	150.5	8
2	Kangaroos	2	1	0	307	238	128.9	8
3	Hawthorn	2	1	0	230	243	95.7	8
4	Collingwood	0	3	0	174	331	52.6	0

=== Group 2 ===
	Team	Won	Lost	Draw	For	Against	%	Points
1	Port Adelaide	3	0	0	315	180	175.0	12
2	Fremantle	2	1	0	225	237	94.9	8
3	Western Bulldogs	1	2	0	256	288	88.9	4
4	Essendon	0	3	0	199	290	68.6	0

=== Group 3 ===
	Team	Won	Lost	Draw	For	Against	%	Points
1	Richmond	2	1	0	230	203	113.3	8
2	Carlton	2	1	0	240	289	83.0	8
3	West Coast	1	2	0	267	243	109.9	4
4	Geelong	1	2	0	239	241	99.2	4

=== Group 4 ===
	Team	Won	Lost	Draw	For	Against	%	Points
1	Adelaide	3	0	0	348	203	171.4	12
2	Brisbane Lions	2	1	0	279	217	128.6	8
3	St Kilda	1	2	0	239	262	91.22	4
4	Melbourne	0	3	0	147	331	44.4	0

== Semi finals ==
	Semi Finals
Friday, 8 March	Richmond 16.11 (107)	def.	Adelaide 9.14 (68)	Colonial Stadium (crowd: 11,265)
Saturday, 9 March	Port Adelaide 13.6 (84)	def.	Sydney 10.10 (70)	Football Park (crowd: 14,162)

== Final ==
Grand Final
Saturday, 16 March	Richmond	def. by	Port Adelaide	Colonial Stadium (crowd: 36,481)
0.1 (1); 2.5 (17); 5.6 (36); 9.8 (62)	Q1; Q2; Q3; Final	2.3 (15); 6.6 (42); 7.7 (49); 10.11 (71)	Michael Tuck Medal: Nick Stevens (Port Adelaide); Television broadcast: Ten
Rodgers 2, Ottens 2, J Bowden, M Richardson, Fiora, Krakouer, A Kellaway	Goals	P Burgoyne 2, Tredrea 2, Schofield, Francou, Cockatoo-Collins, Dew, D Murray, N Stevens
A Kellaway, J Bowden, Ottens, B Holland, Hilton	Best	Port Adelaide: Wanganeen, Francou, N Stevens, Hardwick, D Wakelin, Tredre
Nil	Injuries	Nil
Reports	Hardwick (Port) reported by field umpire Ellis and emergency umpire Schmitt in third quarter for allegedly tripping Hilton (Richmond

== Practice Matches ==
	8-9th March
Friday, 8 March	Brisbane Lions 18.13 (121)	def.	Carlton 19.8 (122)	Gabba
Saturday, 9 March	St Kilda 4.10 (34)	def. by	Kangaroos 25.11 (161)	Moorabbin Oval (crowd: 6,000 est.)
Saturday, 9 March	Essendon 10.10 (70)	def. by	West Coast 16.9 (105)	Optus Oval (crowd: 1,000 est.)
Saturday, 9 March	Geelong 25.13 (163)	def.	Western Bulldogs 9.8 (62)	Baytec Stadium
Saturday, 9 March	Melbourne 19.7 (121)	def.	Hawthorn 8.12 (60)	Deakin Reserve, Shepparton (crowd: 4,500 est.)
Saturday, 9 March	Fremantle 17.19 (121)	def. by	Collingwood 10.4 (64)	Fremantle Oval (crowd: 14,000 est.)

	15-16th March
Friday, 15 March	Essendon 21.12 (138)	def.	Western Bulldogs 16.6 (102)	Lavington Oval, Albury (crowd: 8,940)
Saturday, 16 March	Carlton 11.11 (77)	def. by	Hawthorn 23.18 (156)	Optus Oval (crowd: 1,100 est.)
Saturday, 16 March	Collingwood 15.9 (99)	def.	St Kilda 9.11 (65)	Northern Oval, North Ballarat (crowd: 7,000 est.)
Saturday, 16 March	West Coast 20.13 (133)	def.	Kangaroos 10.9 (69)	Subiaco Oval (crowd: 4,00 est.)
Saturday, 16 March	Melbourne 7.10 (52)	def. by	Sydney 12.12 (84)	Whitten Oval (crowd: 1,000 est.)
Saturday, 16 March	Adelaide 10.14 (74)	def.	Geelong 7.6 (48)	Johnstone Park, Murray Bridge (crowd: 4,000 est.)
Saturday, 16 March	Brisbane Lions 9.8 (62)	def. by	Fremantle 8.15 (63)	Victoria Park (crowd: 700 est.)

== See also ==
- List of Australian Football League night premiers
- 2002 AFL season
