= VFL/AFL pre-season competition =

Annual preseason Australian rules football tournament

- Sport: Australian rules football
- Founded: 1988
- Folded: 2013
- No. of teams: 18
- Country: Australia
- Most titles: Essendon and Hawthorn (4 premierships each)

In the Australian Football League (AFL), previously the Victorian Football League (VFL), the pre-season competition, known during its history by a variety of sponsored names and most recently as the NAB Cup, was an annual Australian rules football tournament held amongst clubs prior to the premiership season between 1988 and 2013. The pre-season competition culminated annually in a grand final and pre-season premier.

== History ==
The pre-season competition was established from the Australian Football Championships Night Series in 1988. The Night Series had been a competition featuring VFL, SANFL, WAFL and minor states representative teams which had been staged partly in the pre-season and partly during the premiership season, generally finishing in July; but, it had reduced in size and importance until 1987, when only VFL teams were involved and the competition was finished by the end of April. In 1988, the competition was moved entirely into the pre-season, and became the VFL Pre-season Cup. The pre-season competition is generally considered to be of equivalent importance as both the AFC Night Series and the VFL Night Series (1956–1971), and records relating to the three competitions are often combined under the general name "night premierships".

Between 1988 and 1999, the competition was run as a simple knock-out tournament in which the winning teams moved through to the next round and losing teams were eliminated. Before there were sixteen teams in the AFL, the previous season's top-ranked teams (either the premier or both grand finalists) were advanced directly to the second round; after Fremantle entered the league as the 16th team in 1995, all teams began in the first round. In 1992, the competition introduced the Michael Tuck Medal for the best player in the grand final.

After criticism that the knock-out format limited the preparation of the losing teams, a round-robin format was introduced in 2000. The sixteen teams were split into groups of four, each playing three pool matches with the winner of each group advancing to the knockout semi-final stage. The public reaction to the change was mixed, as the atmosphere at some of the pool games was noticeably flat compared with previous years. The competition reverted to the straight knock-out format in 2003, and retained that format until 2010.

In 2011, the pre-season competition expanded to eighteen teams with the addition of the Gold Coast Suns (which joined the day premiership in 2011) and the Greater Western Sydney Giants (which joined the day premiership in 2012). As this precluded a straight four-round knock-out competition, the first round of the pre-season competition was staged with six pools of three teams, with each group playing a round-robin of half-length lightning matches on the same day at the same venue. The format from that point was:

- In 2011, the winner of each of the six groups, and the two teams with the next-best records, advanced to an eight-team knock-out tournament of full-length games.
- In 2012 and 2013, all teams then played two pre-scheduled full-length games, giving each team a total of four matches (two lightning matches and two full-length matches). The teams with the best two records over the four matches then faced off in the Grand Final.

After 2013, the competitive aspect of the preseason was abandoned altogether, and replaced with a series of standalone practice matches over several weeks prior to the home-and-away season, featuring no ranking or overall winner. By the 2021 pre-season, these matches were reduced to a single weekend, principally due to changing border restrictions in light of the COVID-19 pandemic. The series has still had its own sponsored name throughout much of this time, although matches are also simply termed "official practice matches."

== Winners ==
Year	Premier	Runner up	Scores	Venue	Crowd	Margin	Winner Season	Runner up Season
1988	Hawthorn	Geelong	10.10 (70) – 9.13 (67)	VFL Park	35,803	3	Premier	9th
1989	Melbourne	Geelong	10.16 (76) – 9.13 (67)	VFL Park	48,720	9	Semi Finalist	Grand Finalist
1990	Essendon	North Melbourne	17.10 (112) – 10.16 (76)	VFL Park	48,559	36	Grand Finalist	6th
1991	Hawthorn (2)	North Melbourne	14.19 (103) – 7.12 (54)	VFL Park	46,629	49	Premier	8th
1992	Hawthorn (3)	Fitzroy	19.14 (128) – 8.15 (63)	VFL Park	49,453	65	Elimination Finalist	10th
1993	Essendon (2)	Richmond	14.18 (102) – 11.13 (79)	VFL Park	75,533	23	Premier	14th
1994	Essendon (3)	Adelaide	15.12 (102) – 9.14 (68)	VFL Park	43,925	34	10th	11th
1995	North Melbourne	Adelaide	14.9 (93) – 8.15 (63)	VFL Park	39,393	30	Preliminary Finalist	11th
1996	St Kilda	Carlton	20.10 (130) – 10.12 (72)	VFL Park	66,888	58	10th	Semi Finalist
1997	Carlton	Geelong	14.13 (97) – 5.10 (40)	MCG	63,898	57	11th	Semi Finalist
1998	North Melbourne (2)	St Kilda	14.13 (97) – 12.11 (83)	VFL Park	63,760	14	Grand Finalist	Semi Finalist
1999	Hawthorn (4)	Port Adelaide	12.11 (83) – 5.6 (36)	VFL Park	49,874	47	9th	Elimination Finalist
2000	Essendon (3)	Kangaroos	16.21 (117) – 11.10 (76)	MCG	56,720	41	Premier	Preliminary Finalist
2001	Port Adelaide	Brisbane Lions	17.9 (111) – 3.8 (26)	Football Park	35,304	85	Semi Finalist	Premier
2002	Port Adelaide (2)	Richmond	10.11 (71) – 9.8 (62)	Colonial Stadium	36,481	9	Preliminary Finalist	14th
2003	Adelaide	Collingwood	2.13.8 (104) – 1.9.10 (73)	Telstra Dome	43,571	31	Semi Finalist	Grand Finalist
2004	St Kilda (2)	Geelong	1.14.5 (98) – 1.10.7 (76)	Telstra Dome	50,533	22	Preliminary Finalist	Preliminary Finalist
2005	Carlton (2)	West Coast	1.14.18 (111) – 1.11.9 (84)	Telstra Dome	43,391	27	16th (Wooden Spoon)	Grand Finalist
2006	Geelong	Adelaide	3.10.5 (92) – 1.10.15 (84)	AAMI Stadium	30,707	8	9th	Preliminary Finalist
2007	Carlton (3)	Brisbane Lions	2.12.7 (97) – 0.10.12 (72)	Telstra Dome	46,094	25	15th	10th
2008	St Kilda (3)	Adelaide	2.7.9 (69) – 0.9.10 (64)	AAMI Stadium	26,823	5	Preliminary Finalist	Elimination Finalist
2009	Geelong (2)	Collingwood	0.18.19 (127) – 1.6.6 (51)	Etihad Stadium	37,277	76	Premier	Preliminary Finalist
2010	Western Bulldogs	St Kilda	2.13.8 (104) – 0.9.10 (64)	Etihad Stadium	42,381	40	Preliminary Finalist	Grand Finalist
2011	Collingwood	Essendon	1.15.9 (108) – 0.13.8 (86)	Etihad Stadium	45,304	22	Grand Finalist	Elimination Finalist
2012	Adelaide (2)	West Coast	2.10.17 (95) – 2.5.13 (61)	AAMI Stadium	27,376	34	Preliminary Finalist	Semi Finalist
2013	Brisbane	Carlton	0.16.13 (109) – 2.7.9 (69)	Etihad Stadium	24,884	40	12th	Semi Finalist

=== Most pre-season cup premierships ===
Team	Wins	Most Recent Win
Essendon	4	2000
Hawthorn	4	1999
St Kilda	3	2008
Carlton	3	2007
Adelaide	2	2012
Geelong	2	2009
Port Adelaide	2	2002
North Melbourne	2	1998
Brisbane	1	2013
Collingwood	1	2011
Western Bulldogs	1	2010
Melbourne	1	1989

== Rules ==
Most games during the pre-season competition, including the final, were night matches. Normal games were typically played slightly short of full-length (quarters lasting 17½ or 18 minutes plus time-on instead of the normal 20), and with an extended interchange bench of six or eight players to offer less physically demanding conditions for the pre-season games. Lightning matches, when they were played from 2011 until 2013, were played over two-halves of 20 minutes plus time-on. Extra time was played to resolve drawn knock-out games.

From 2003 to 2017, pre-season matches featured the super goal as a scoring option. The super goal, which scores nine points, is awarded for a goal kicked from beyond the 50-metre arc.

Particularly in the 21st century, the pre-season competition was used to trial rule changes before they are introduced into the premiership season. Among the notable rule trials were:

2003

- Three points for a deliberate rushed behind.

2005

- After a behind is scored, no requirement to wait for the goal umpires to finish waving their flags before kicking out. (Has been introduced into the premiership season)
- A larger centre circle.
- Four field umpires. (Has been introduced into the premiership season)
- Umpires coming in 10m from the boundary line to throw in the ball.
- Play on if the ball hits the goal post and bounces back into the field of play.

2006

- Play on called for backward kicks, except when that kick takes place within the attacking team's forward 50m.

2007

- Video replay umpire for goals. Ability for goal umpire decisions to be overruled by video umpire.
- All nine umpires able to pay free kicks (includes boundary and goal umpires) (Trialled only in Melbourne vs Hawthorn Round 1 NAB Cup 2007)
- Play on called for backward kicks, only in the defensive half of the field.
- Kick must travel 20m to be paid a mark.

2008

- Eight players on the interchange bench, only 16 interchanges permitted each quarter.
- 2.5m x 6.5m "no-go" area around the centre bounce, where players are prohibited before and during the bounce until the umpire clears the area.
- Centre bounces only at the start of a quarter and after goals, ball is thrown up otherwise. (Has been introduced into the premiership season)

2009

- If the ball is hand-passed or kicked for a rushed behind the opposition receives a free kick (Introduced into the premiership season in 2009 AFL season)

2010

- Players can determine if there is an advantage in play (has been introduced into the premiership season)

== Notable events ==
1990

Essendon vs Fitzroy (Feb.28) was the first VFL/AFL match to be decided using extra-time – Essendon winning by a goal in overtime then winning their next two matches to claim the title.

1993

Problems with new turf at Waverley Park forced the relocation of three matches – Melbourne v Collingwood (Feb.17) was moved to Princes Park, whilst Essendon v Brisbane (Feb.27) and Footscray v Fitzroy (Feb.28) were moved to Kardinia Park.

A record night series/pre-season Grand Final crowd of 75,533 fans saw Essendon defeat Richmond.

1997

The grand final was held at the MCG to capitalise on Grand Prix weekend in Melbourne, the first time it had been played away from Waverley Park. A near-record crowd of 74,786 watched Carlton defeat Geelong.

1998

Pre-season football was played outside Australia for the first time, with Brisbane defeating Fremantle in Cape Town, South Africa (Feb.22) followed by Melbourne defeating Sydney in Wellington, New Zealand (Mar.1).

2000

Carlton and Collingwood played the earliest pre-season match in history, with a one-off match called the "Millennium Challenge" played on the evening of 31 December 1999 at the MCG and counting towards the preseason competition. The game attendance was 16,678.

2001

The final was played for the first time between two non-Victorian teams, and consequently the match was played outside Victoria, at Football Park in Adelaide.

2006

A new rule was introduced to determine the venue of the pre-season Grand Final. The team scoring the most goals in the first three rounds would host the title match. If two teams were tied after the semi-finals the number of super goals kicked would act as a tie-breaker.

=== Naming rights sponsors ===
==== Pre-season competition ====
- Panasonic Cup (1988–89)
- Foster's Cup (1990–94)
- Ansett Australia Cup (1995–2001)
- Wizard Home Loans Cup (2002–2005)
- NAB Cup (2006–2013)

==== Pre-season series ====
- NAB Challenge (2014–2016)
- JLT Community Series (2017–2019)
- Marsh Community Series (2020)
- AAMI Community Series (2021–2022; 2024–)

=== Trophy ===
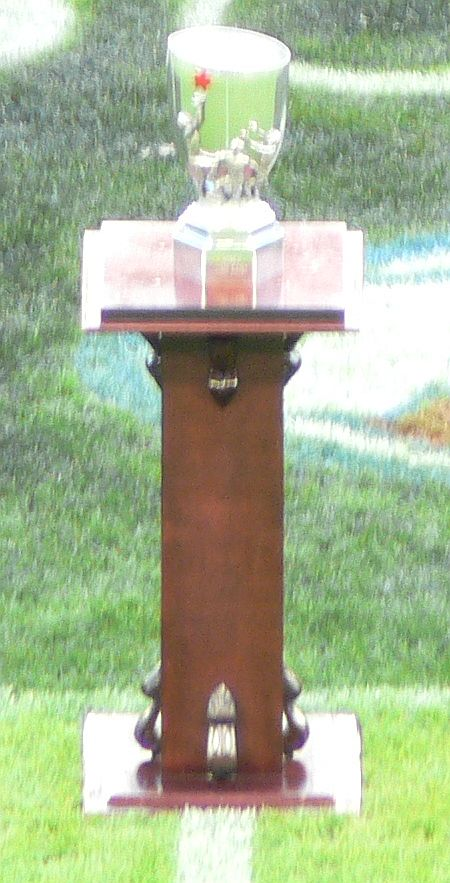
2007 NAB Cup trophy won by the Carlton Football Club

The trophy design for the pre-season cup varied greatly over the years.

During its time as the Wizard Home Loans Cup, the trophy was affectionately known by fans as the "Wizard Wok" due to its shape resembling a wok.

=== Monetary prize ===
The prize money awarded to the winning club was A$180,000 as of the 2012 NAB Cup, awarded by the National Australia Bank as major sponsor of the competition.

As an incentive for clubs to produce competitive performances in the pre-season competition, a bonus A$1 million in prize money was on offer to any club which could win both the pre-season cup and premiership during the 2007 AFL season. This prize would have been separate from the A$220,000 and A$1.4 million prizes for the NAB Cup and premiership victors, respectively, and was pledged by the league's two major sponsors, Toyota and National Australia Bank. The distribution of the prize would have resulted in half being awarded to the winning club and half being divided among the club's players. Ultimately, however, this offer did not eventuate, as two separate clubs, Carlton and Geelong, won the 2007 NAB Cup and 2007 premiership, respectively, and the incentive was discontinued in future seasons.

== Attendances ==
Although many clubs and coaches (especially the wealthier clubs) did not take the pre-season competition seriously and used the competition as a chance to test young and inexperienced players, the preseason competition proved reasonably popular with spectators. The competition's grand final could draw more than 60,000 spectators to the Melbourne Cricket Ground, and usually drew more than 40,000 to Docklands Stadium or Football Park (both of which have a capacity of around 55,000)

Season	Total Attendance	Matches	Average
2017	165,420	27	6,127
2016	191,355	27	7,087
2015	206,663	27	7,654
2014	171,224	27	6,342
2013	418,095	43	9,723
2012	493,982	44	11,227
2011	518,572	25	20,743
2010	227,481	15	15,165
2009	282,585	15	18,839
2008	244,103	15	16,274
2007	246,321	15	16,421
2006	235,980	15	15,732
2005	307,181	15	20,479

== Other pre-season competitions ==
=== Lightning premiership ===
A lightning premiership was held for the only time in the modern era in 1996 – the centenary season of the AFL. It was a knock-out competition played from Friday, 9 February until Sunday, 11 February, with four shortened games each evening at Waverley Park, each consisting of two 17.5-minute halves.

The game trialled a number of highly experimental rules, including three points awarded both for deliberate rushed behinds and balls which hit the goalposts, and timekeepers not blowing the siren if scores were tied. However, the rule which altered play most significantly was the ball not being thrown in from the boundary line after travelling out of bounds, a free kick being awarded instead against the last team to touch the ball. Essendon won the title, defeating Brisbane by 17 points in the grand final.

=== Regional challenge ===
From 2003 until the demise of the pre-season cup competition, the AFL ran a series of practice matches called the Regional Challenge or NAB Challenge for clubs that were eliminated from the main competition. It provided eliminated teams with match practice before the main premiership season and brought the game to fans in remote areas while gauging interest in new markets.

Venues were limited to those that were considered AFL standard. This required surfaces that prevent injury to players, spectator facilities including grandstand seating, and adequate lights for night matches. Many of the matches in this series were still played at current AFL and former AFL metropolitan venues, particularly since 2007 when the Victorian drought made many regional grounds in Victoria either unavailable or unsuitable for AFL matches. Although the games were exhibitional in nature and there was no prize, they attracted a large amount of interest in regional areas and grew in popularity.

== See also ==
- List of Australian Football League pre-season and night series premiers
- Michael Tuck Medal, awarded to the best player in a night series grand final
