= Nick Stevens =

Australian rules footballer, born 1980

Personal information
- Born: 3 January 1980 (age 46); Melbourne
- Original team: St Mary's / Preston U18 (TAC Cup)
- Debut: Round 6, 2 May 1998, Port Adelaide vs. Fremantle, at Football Park
- Height: 181 cm (5 ft 11 in)
- Position: Midfielder

Playing career^{1}
Years	Club	Games (Goals)
1998–2003	Port Adelaide	127 (78)
2004–2009	Carlton	104 (61)
Total		231 (139)
- ^{1} Playing statistics correct to the end of 2009.

Career highlights
- Carlton vice-captain: 2007–2009; Michael Tuck Medal 2002, 2007; Four pre-season premierships: 2001, 2002, 2005, 2007; AFL Players Association best first-year player: 1998; AFL Rising Star nominee: 1998

Nick Stevens (born 3 January 1980) is a former Australian rules footballer in the Australian Football League and former coach of South Australian National Football League club Glenelg. He played in four pre-season premierships, with Port Adelaide in 2001 and 2002, and with Carlton in 2005 and 2007. He is the only man to have won more than one Michael Tuck Medal, winning the awards in 2002 for Port Adelaide and in 2007 for Carlton. Stevens played a total of 104 games for Carlton and 127 for Port Adelaide.

== Port Adelaide ==
Originally from St Mary's in the VMFL, Stevens was recruited in the 1997 AFL draft to the Port Adelaide Football Club using pick 25. He was an under-16 All-Australian who was well suited to half-back and ruck-roving. As he matured, he became a very prominent outside midfielder. In 1998, he was runner-up to Byron Pickett for the NAB Rising Star Award. He also was awarded the inaugural AFL Players Association Best First-Year Player award. He managed to play every game in 1999, coming off half-forward and the wing; he finished fourth in the club's best and fairest. In 2000, he continued to develop into a match-winner and finished second in the club's best and fairest after he missed five games due to suspension. Stevens played a total of 127 games for Port Adelaide, including back-to-back pre-season premierships in 2001 and 2002.

== Carlton ==
At the end of the 2003 season, Stevens expressed a desire to return to his native Melbourne and wished to be traded to Collingwood. Port Adelaide was unable to obtain what it considered appropriate trade consideration, and, as a result, Stevens quit the club and entered the pre-season draft. He was subsequently drafted by Carlton with the second selection in that draft.

Stevens was named vice-captain of the club in 2007, a position he held until his retirement. After Round 3, on advice from specialists, Stevens had surgery to heal a prolapsed disc in his neck, ending his season; he had sustained a neck injury in a front-on collision with Melbourne's David Neitz in late 2006 but had continued to play and train. The injury was a major blow to Carlton, as Stevens had been in fantastic form through the pre-season and early rounds. On 23 August 2007, it was announced that Stevens had signed with the Blues until the end of 2010.

By his standards, Stevens had a poor season in 2009, struggling to make a strong impact in many games, and attracting criticism for deficiencies in his defensive game. During the midpoint of the 2007 season, Stevens was dropped to the VFL for a few games. At the conclusion of the season, it was revealed that Stevens had sustained another, more serious, recurrence of his neck injury from 2007, most likely caused by a collision with captain Chris Judd in Round 22. Facing the risk of permanent spinal damage if he played on, Stevens officially announced his retirement on 29 October 2009, with one year remaining on his contract.

Stevens played a total of 104 games for Carlton and 127 for Port Adelaide.

== Post-football career ==
Following his retirement from AFL, Stevens focused on expanding his business, NJS Signature Landscapes, in Melbourne. Additionally, he took on the senior coaching role of the NSW/ACT Rams for the AFL Under-18 Championships for 2010 and 2011; he had served as an assistant midfield coach for the team since 2006 while still playing for Carlton.

In August 2011, Stevens made a return to the field, playing games for Montmorency in the Northern Football League, where he was still playing in 2012. In November 2011, Stevens was appointed as senior coach at the Gippsland Power in the TAC Cup for the 2012 season.

At the end of the 2013 season, Stevens joined South Australian National Football League club Glenelg as coach. Prior to Stevens' appointment the Tigers won just once in their last 15 games, finishing bottom in 2013.

=== Criminal history ===
Stevens only served one season of his coaching contract and was sacked in January 2015, after he was found guilty of assault and threats to bash his ex-partner. In March 2015, Stevens was sentenced to eight months jail but appealed. He was again found guilty in July 2016, sentenced to six months jail (with three months suspended), and fined $3,000.

Stevens was charged in 2019 with Obtain Financial Advantage by Deception by the Victorian Police in the Magistrates Court, with the case being taken over by the Office of Public Prosecutions after referral to a higher court (the Country Court of Victoria). Stevens has been on bail since that time. Stevens has maintained his innocence throughout that time, pleading not guilty to the charges.

Stevens case is currently on trial for dishonestly, facing 18 fraud-related charges, including obtaining a financial advantage by deception, after allegedly accepting $170,000 from six families to install swimming pools that were either not started or left incomplete at properties in the Mildura region.

The first trial in June 2025, Victorian County Court Judge Fran Dalziel discharged the jury in the second week of Nick Stevens’ fraud trial, after revealing she had previously been involved in a separate prosecution against the former Carlton star as a Crown Prosecutor.

A new four-week trial was scheduled to go ahead in late February 2026, however the County Court experienced significant delays, including a juror discharge in May 2025 and an earlier trial being aborted due to a judge mix-up, according to a report by ABC News.

After nearly nine years, the case moved from indictment to a 15 day trial beginning in March 2026 in the Melbourne County Court

A jury found Stevens guilty on 12 counts of obtaining a financial advantage by deception and one charge of using a false document.

He was found not guilty on one charge of obtaining a financial advantage by deception, relating to the first victim, he has been remanded into custody pending sentencing.

Stevens, who had been on bail, was taken into custody after the verdict as County Court Judge Stokes said he was now “very likely” to be facing a reasonable prison term at sentencing.

He was scheduled return to court for a pre-sentence hearing on May 21, 2026.

Stevens was jailed for nine months over the Mildura pool fraud on 15 June 2026. He spent 78 days in pre-sentence detention and was ordered to serve a two-year community corrections order on his release.

== Brother ==
Nick's brother Danny Stevens played 15 games for North Melbourne between 1996 and 1999.
