= 1994 Foster's Cup =

- AFL pre-season competition
- Season: 1994
- Teams: 15
- Winners: Essendon (3rd title)
- Matches played: 14
- Attendance: 251,736 (average 17,981 per match)
- Michael Tuck Medallist: Gary O'Donnell (Essendon)

The 1994 AFL Foster's Cup was the Australian Football League pre-season cup competition played in its entirety before the 1994 season began.

== Games ==
=== First round ===
Home team	Home team score	Away team	Away team score	Ground	Crowd	Date
Collingwood	13.14 (92)	North Melbourne	13.13 (91)	Waverley Park	25,708	Saturday, 19 February
St Kilda	14.12 (96)	Richmond	17.14 (116) (Note: The match was decided after extra time; scores were level at 14.12 (96) apiece after the conclusion of regular time.)	Waverley Park	18,662	Monday, 21 February
Adelaide	16.17 (113)	West Coast	14.10 (94)	Football Park	28,776	Wednesday, 23 February
Fitzroy	12.13 (85)	Geelong	10.11 (71)	Waverley Park	9,080	Wednesday, 23 February
Sydney	16.9 (105)	Footscray	15.12 (102)	Robertson Oval	5,525	Saturday, 26 February
Carlton	11.18 (84)	Hawthorn	14.15 (99)	Waverley Park	26,117	Saturday, 26 February
Brisbane	18.18 (126)	Melbourne	14.10 (94)	Gabba	4,728	Sunday, 27 February

=== Quarter-finals ===
Home team	Home team score	Away team	Away team score	Ground	Crowd	Date
Collingwood	15.15 (105)	Richmond	7.14 (56)	Waverley Park	26,913	Monday, 28 February
Adelaide	15.18 (108)	Fitzroy	13.8 (86)	Waverley Park	5,494	Wednesday, 2 March
Sydney	14.10 (94)	Hawthorn	20.13 (133)	Waverley Park	11,785	Saturday, 5 March
Essendon	15.19 (109)	Brisbane	6.11 (47)	Waverley Park	11,383	Sunday, 6 March

=== Semi-finals ===
Home team	Home team score	Away team	Away team score	Ground	Crowd	Date
Collingwood	7.10 (52)	Adelaide	13.11 (89)	Waverley Park	12,222	Wednesday, 9 March
Hawthorn	13.9 (87)	Essendon	15.12 (102)	Waverley Park	21,418	Saturday, 12 March

=== Final ===
Home team	Home team score	Away team	Away team score	Ground	Crowd	Date
Adelaide	9.14 (68)	Essendon	15.12 (102)	Waverley Park	43,925	Saturday, 19 March

== See also ==
- List of Australian Football League night premiers
- 1994 AFL season
