= 1997 Ansett Australia Cup =

- AFL pre-season competition
- Season: 1997
- Teams: 16
- Winners: Carlton (2nd title)
- Matches played: 15
- Attendance: 296,589 (average 19,773 per match)
- Michael Tuck Medallist: Craig Bradley (Carlton)

The 1997 AFL Ansett Australia Cup was the Australian Football League Pre-season Cup competition played in its entirety before the Australian Football League's 1997 Premiership Season began. It culminated in the final in March 1997.

== Games ==
=== Round of 16 ===
Home team	Home team score	Away team	Away team score	Ground	Crowd	Date	Time
Adelaide	17.14 (116)	Collingwood	9.8 (62)	Football Park	20,617	Friday 21 February 1997	8:00 pm
Geelong	9.10 (64)	West Coast	5.4 (34)	Waverley Park	7,752	Saturday, 22 February 1997	8:00 pm
Hawthorn	9.11 (65)	Richmond	11.13 (79)	Waverley Park	18,129	Sunday, 23 February 1997	8:00 pm
North Melbourne	13.9 (87)	Western Bulldogs	11.8 (74)	Waverley Park	8,841	Monday, 24 February 1997	8:00 pm
Melbourne	9.10 (64)	Carlton	13.9 (87)	Waverley Park	14,043	Wednesday, 26 February 1997	8:00 pm
Port Adelaide	4.15 (39)	Fremantle	11.9 (75)	Football Park	21,770	Friday, 28 February 1997	8:00 pm
Sydney	10.7 (67)	St Kilda	9.14 (68)	Bruce Stadium	11,510	Saturday, 1 March 1997	2:00 pm
Brisbane	15. 13 (103)	Essendon	8.7 (55)	The Gabba	13,745	Monday, 3 March 1997	7:00 pm

=== Quarter-finals ===
Home team	Home team score	Away team	Away team score	Ground	Crowd	Date	Time
Adelaide	7.10 (52)	Geelong	11.14 (80)	Football Park	22,425	Sunday, 2 March 1997	8:00 pm
Richmond	9.9 (63)	North Melbourne	22.10 (142)	Waverley Park	20,747	Friday, 7 March 1997	8:00 pm
Carlton	15.13 (103)	Fremantle	9.11 (65)	Waverley Park	8,135	Saturday, 8 March 1997	8:00 pm
St Kilda	11.10 (76)	Brisbane	11.7 (73)	Waverley Park	13,745	Sunday, 9 March 1997	8:00 pm

=== Semi-finals ===
Home team	Home team score	Away team	Away team score	Ground	Crowd	Date	Time
Geelong	14.13 (97)	North Melbourne	14.12 (96)	Waverley Park	14,404	Friday, 14 March 1997	8:00 pm
Carlton	12.11 (83)	St Kilda	10.13 (73)	Waverley Park	25,940	Saturday, 15 March 1997	8:00 pm

=== Final ===
Home team	Home team score	Away team	Away team score	Ground	Crowd	Date	Time
Carlton	14.13 (97)	Geelong	5.10 (40)	Melbourne Cricket Ground	74,786	Friday 21 March	8:00 pm

== Final placings ==
1. Carlton
2. Geelong
3. North Melbourne
4. St Kilda
5. Brisbane
6. Adelaide
7. Fremantle
8. Richmond
9. Sydney
10. Western Bulldogs
11. Hawthorn
12. Melbourne
13. Collingwood
14. Essendon
15. West Coast
16. Port Adelaide

== See also ==
- List of Australian Football League night premiers
- 1997 AFL season
