= 1999 Ansett Australia Cup =

- Season: 1999
- Teams: 16
- Winners: Hawthorn (3rd title)
- Matches played: 15
- Attendance: 274,488 (average 18,299 per match)
- Michael Tuck Medallist: Paul Salmon (Hawthorn)

The 1999 AFL Ansett Australia Cup was the Australian Football League Pre-season Cup competition played in its entirety before the Australian Football League's 1999 Premiership Season began. It culminated the final in March 1999.

== Games ==
=== Round of 16 ===
	Round of 16
Thursday, 11 February (6:00 PM)	Fremantle 7.8 (50)	def. by	Hawthorn 14.12 (96)	Subiaco Oval (crowd: 12,088)
Friday, 12 February (7:00 PM)	Brisbane Lions 12.15 (87)	def.	Carlton 4.4 (28)	The Gabba (crowd: 16,318)
Saturday, 13 February (5:00 PM)	Sydney 12.13 (85)	def.	Collingwood 11.8 (74)	Manuka Oval (crowd: 13,313)
Saturday, 13 February (6:00 PM)	Essendon 14.8 (92)	def. by	Western Bulldogs 18.12 (120)	Marrara Oval (crowd: 14,211)
Thursday, 18 February (8:00 PM)	Richmond 8.15 (63)	def.	West Coast 6.10 (46)	Waverley Park (crowd: 11,325)
Friday, 19 February (8:00 PM)	Adelaide 8.9 (57)	def. by	Port Adelaide 13.15 (93)	Football Park (crowd: 40,577)
Saturday, 20 February (8:00 PM)	Geelong 9.7 (61)	def. by	Kangaroos 20.14 (134)	Waverley Park (crowd: 13,514)
Sunday, 21 February (8:00 PM)	Melbourne 9.6 (60)	def. by	St Kilda 12.9 (81)	Waverley Park (crowd: 16,321)

=== Quarter-finals ===
	Quarter-finals
Monday, 22 February (8:00 PM)	Hawthorn 14.8 (92)	def.	Brisbane Lions 10.9 (69)	Waverley Park (crowd: 12,993)
Thursday, 25 February (8:00 PM)	Sydney 4.11 (35)	def. by	Western Bulldogs 9.9 (63)	Waverley Park (crowd: 8,948)
Friday, 26 February (8:00 PM)	Richmond 10.7 (67)	def. by	Port Adelaide 16.16 (112)	Football Park (crowd: 16,935)
Saturday, 27 February (2:00 PM)	Kangaroos 13.8 (86)	def. by	St Kilda 13.17 (95)	North Hobart Oval (crowd: 7,815)

=== Semi-finals ===
	Semi-finals
Friday, 5 March (8:00 PM)	Hawthorn 10.11 (71)	def.	Western Bulldogs 8.13 (61)	Waverley Park (crowd: 24,175)
Saturday, 6 March (8:00 PM)	Port Adelaide 10.11 (71)	def.	St Kilda 7.7 (49)	Melbourne Cricket Ground (crowd: 16,081)

=== Final ===
	Final
Saturday, 13 March (8:05 PM)	Hawthorn 12.11 (83)	def.	Port Adelaide 5.6 (36)	Waverley Park (crowd: 49,874)

== Final Placings ==
1. Hawthorn
2. Port Adelaide
3. Western Bulldogs
4. St Kilda
5. Kangaroos
6. Brisbane
7. Richmond
8. Sydney
9. Collingwood
10. Essendon
11. Melbourne
12. West Coast
13. Adelaide
14. Fremantle
15. Geelong
16. Carlton

== Practice matches ==
Sunday, 31 January	Hawthorn 19.9 (123)	def.	Richmond 7.12 (54)	North Hobart Oval (crowd: 10,521)
Friday, 5 February	Essendon 10.15 (75)	def.	Port Adelaide 8.11 (59)	Victoria Park
Friday, 5 February	Collingwood 8.11 (59)	def.	Carlton 5.7 (37)	Optus Oval
Friday, 5 February	West Coast 13.10 (88)	def.	Fremantle 4.5 (29)	Fremantle Oval (crowd: 13,000 est.)
Saturday, 6 February	Western Bulldogs 11.14 (80)	def.	St Kilda 7.13 (55)	Trevor Barker Beach Oval
Saturday, 6 February	Brisbane Lions 8.9 (57)	def.	Geelong 7.9 (51)	Southport Oval
Saturday, 6 February	Kangaroos 22.12 (144)	def.	Sydney 9.7 (61)	Monarch Field, Macquarie Fields
Saturday, 6 February	Richmond 10.9 (69)	def.	Northern Territory 3.5 (23)	Darwin, Northern Territory (crowd: 10,000 est.)
Friday, 12 February	Melbourne 11.12 (78)	def.	Adelaide 11.7 (73)	Football Park (crowd: 6,933)
Saturday, 13 February	Kangaroos 19.4 (118)	def.	Port Adelaide 10.6 (66)	Alberton Oval (crowd: 8,000 est.)
Sunday, 14 February	Geelong 16.18 (114)	def.	St Kilda 7.8 (50)	North Hobart Oval (crowd: 8,575)
Friday, 26 February	West Coast 14.9 (103)	def.	Collingwood 6.7 (43)	Subiaco Oval
Saturday, 27 February	Essendon 14.13 (97)	def.	Fremantle 13.13 (91)	Waverley Park (crowd: 2,000)
Saturday, 27 February	Adelaide 11.12 (78)	def.	Geelong 9.13 (67)	Whyalla (crowd: 8,821)
Sunday, 28 February	Carlton 22.17 (147)	def.	Melbourne 17.10 (112)	Maryborough, Victoria (crowd: 8,400)
Saturday, 6 March	Geelong 16.10 (106)	def.	Richmond 12.10 (82)	Kardinia Park
Saturday, 6 March	West Coast 16.14 (110)	def.	Carlton 13.8 (86)	Waverley Park (crowd: 1,500)
Saturday, 6 March	Essendon 15.10 (100)	def.	Brisbane Lions 9.20 (74)	Waverley Park (crowd: 1,500)
Saturday, 6 March	Melbourne 9.8 (62)	def.	Sydney 5.8 (38)	Lavington Oval (crowd: 3,000)
Saturday, 6 March	Fremantle 13.17 (95)	def.	Adelaide 7.12 (54)	Subiaco Oval
Sunday, 7 March	Kangaroos 17.11 (113)	def.	Collingwood 11.15 (81)	Victoria Park (crowd: 5,000)
Saturday, 13 March	Carlton 15.8 (98)	def.	St Kilda 13.11 (89)	Optus Oval (crowd: 2,578)
Saturday, 13 March	Richmond 12.14 (86)	def.	Western Bulldogs 9.10 (64)	York Park (crowd: 7,425)
Saturday, 13 March	Sydney 12.10 (82)	def.	Brisbane Lions 10.7 (67)	Monarch Field, Macquarie Fields (crowd: 2,500)
Saturday, 13 March	Melbourne 11.12 (78)	def.	Fremantle 10.9 (69)	Victoria Park (crowd: 500)
Saturday, 13 March	Adelaide 8.13 (61)	def.	Kangaroos 6.3 (39)	Penola, South Australia (crowd: 7,000)
Saturday, 13 March	Essendon 17.10 (112)	def.	West Coast 12.9 (81)	Subiaco Oval (crowd: 6,168)
Sunday, 14 March	Collingwood 13.5 (83)	def.	Geelong 8.15 (63)	Queen Elizabeth Oval, Bendigo (crowd: 15,500)

== See also ==
- List of Australian Football League night premiers
- 1999 AFL season
