= Michael Tuck Medal =

AFL Pre-season Cup Final sportsmanship award (1992-2013)

The Michael Tuck Medal was awarded to the best-and-fairest player in the AFL Pre-season Cup Final. The award was presented annually between 1992 and 2013; since 2014, the award has not been presented due to the preseason being structured without a final. It is named after Michael Tuck, who played 426 senior matches for Hawthorn between 1972 and 1991 and was the VFL/AFL games record holder until being surpassed by Brent Harvey in Round 19, 2016.

== Recipients ==
Year	Player	Team
1992	Paul Hudson	Hawthorn
1993	Gavin Wanganeen	Essendon
1994	Gary O'Donnell	Essendon
1995	Mick Martyn	North Melbourne
1996	Nicky Winmar	St Kilda
1997	Craig Bradley	Carlton
1998	Wayne Carey	North Melbourne
1999	Paul Salmon	Hawthorn
2000	Mark Mercuri	Essendon
2001	Adam Kingsley	Port Adelaide
2002	Nick Stevens	Port Adelaide
2003	Andrew McLeod	Adelaide
2004	Robert Harvey	St Kilda
2005	Brendan Fevola	Carlton
2006	Simon Goodwin	Adelaide
2007	Nick Stevens	Carlton
2008	Jason Gram	St Kilda
2009	Joel Selwood	Geelong
2010	Barry Hall	Western Bulldogs
2011	Heath Shaw	Collingwood
2012	Bernie Vince	Adelaide
2013	Daniel Rich	Brisbane Lions

Italics - denotes winner from losing team of that Grand Final.

== Trivia ==
- Adelaide's Simon Goodwin is the only player to win the medal despite playing in the losing side when they were defeated by Geelong in 2006.
- Nick Stevens is the only player to win two Michael Tuck medals. He won the award in 2002 with Port Adelaide, and in 2007 with Carlton.
- Tuck committed an amusing faux pas in 2005, when he himself accidentally referred to the medal as the Norm Smith Medal while presenting it (the Norm Smith Medal is awarded to the best-and-fairest player in the premiership season grand final). He has alluded to this mistake prior to awarding the medal in future seasons by emphasising his name; in 2009 his words were "my name is Michael Tuck, and the winner of the Michael Tuck Medal is Joel Selwood."
