= 1992 Foster's Cup =

- AFL pre-season competition
- Season: 1992
- Teams: 15
- Winners: Hawthorn (3rd title)
- Matches played: 14
- Attendance: 238,919 (average 17,066 per match)
- Michael Tuck Medallist: Paul Hudson (Hawthorn)

The 1992 AFL Foster's Cup was the Australian Football League pre-season cup competition played in its entirety before the 1992 season began.

== Games ==
=== 1st Round ===
Home team	Home team score	Away team	Away team score	Ground	Crowd	Date
Richmond	12.11 (83)	Brisbane	11.13 (79)	Waverley Park	14,926	Saturday, 8 February
West Coast	14.13 (97)	Collingwood	8.15 (63)	Marrara Oval	11,000	Sunday, 9 February
Geelong	9.20 (74)	St Kilda	9.17 (71)	Waverley Park	20,916	Wednesday, 12 February
Footscray	15.13 (103)	Melbourne	7.19 (61)	Waverley Park	14,596	Saturday, 15 February
Carlton	7.8 (50)	Adelaide	14.6 (90)	Football Park	35,225	Wednesday, 19 February
Essendon	11.11 (77)	Sydney	20.18 (138)	Lavington Oval	13,500	Saturday, 22 February
Fitzroy	13.12 (90)	North Melbourne	12.16 (88)	North Hobart Oval	5,256	Sunday, 23 February

=== Quarter-finals ===
Home team	Home team score	Away team	Away team score	Ground	Crowd	Date
Hawthorn	20.12 (132)	Richmond	15.14 (104)	Waverley Park	21,893	Saturday, 22 February
Geelong	15.9 (99)	West Coast	11.12 (78)	Waverley Park	8,367	Wednesday, 26 February
Footscray	9.7 (61)	Adelaide	15.10 (100)	Waverley Park	10,765	Saturday, 29 February
Fitzroy	10.15 (75)	Sydney	2.5 (17)	Waverley Park	5,280	Sunday, 1 March

=== Semi-finals ===
Home team	Home team score	Away team	Away team score	Ground	Crowd	Date
Geelong	12.9 (81)	Hawthorn	20.14 (134)	Waverley Park	20,103	Wednesday, 4 March
Fitzroy	15.5 (95)	Adelaide	9.10 (64)	Waverley Park	7,639	Friday, 6 March

=== Final ===
Home team	Home team score	Away team	Away team score	Ground	Crowd	Date
Fitzroy	8.15 (63)	Hawthorn	19.14 (128)	Waverley Park	49,453	Saturday, 14 March

=== Practice Matches ===
Saturday, 1 February	West Coast 20.7 (127)	def.	Adelaide 8.7 (55)	Football Park (crowd: 29,736)
Sunday, 2 February	Richmond 19.10 (124)	def.	Geelong 13.13 (91)	Waverley Park (crowd: 7,500)
Sunday, 2 February	Footscray 20.15 (135)	def.	Collingwood 16.12 (108)	Skinner Reserve (crowd: 8,500)
Saturday, 8 February	Fitzroy 13.21 (99)	def.	Melbourne 10.14 (74)	Bulleen Park
Sunday, 9 February	Adelaide 18.12 (120)	def.	Essendon 8.13 (61)	Football Park (crowd: 21,208)
Sunday, 9 February	Hawthorn 18.18 (126)	def.	Footscray 13.12 (90)	Waverley Park (crowd: 1,500)
Saturday, 15 February	Fitzroy 20.12 (180)	def.	Richmond 10.5 (65)	Bulleen Park (crowd: 2,500)
Sunday, 16 February	Hawthorn 15.13 (103)	def.	Sydney 8.17 (65)	Waverley Park (crowd: 3,000)
Sunday, 16 February	North Melbourne 23.23 (161)	def.	Essendon 16.9 (105)	Boronia (crowd: 3,500)
Saturday, 29 February	Richmond 19.14 (128)	def.	Melbourne 18.12 (120)	Skinner Reserve (crowd: 2,000)
Saturday, 7 March	Collingwood 26.20 (176)	def.	Melbourne 8.10 (58)	Ballarat (crowd: 9,000)
Sunday, 8 March	North Melbourne 22.21 (153)	def.	Carlton 17.17 (119)	Traralgon (crowd: 4,500)
Sunday, 8 March	Brisbane Bears 18.19 (127)	def.	St Kilda 15.13 (103)	Sunshine (crowd: 2,500)
Saturday, 14 March	Geelong 23.15 (153)	def.	Footscray 11.7 (73)	Skinner Reserve
Saturday, 14 March	West Coast 31.17 (203)	def.	Sydney 10.6 (66)	Subiaco Oval
Saturday, 14 March	Melbourne 20.8 (128)	def.	Brisbane Bears 9.11 (65)	Carrara Oval
Sunday, 15 March	North Melbourne 25.30 (180)	def.	Richmond 11.12 (78)	Waverley Park
Sunday, 15 March	Collingwood 17.17 (119)	def.	Essendon 15.7 (97)	Skinner Reserve
Sunday, 15 March	Carlton 13.15 (93)	def.	St Kilda 12.11 (83)	West Park Oval, Burnie

== See also ==
- List of Australian Football League night premiers
- 1992 AFL season
