= 1988 National Panasonic Cup =

Football cup

- AFL pre-season competition
- Season: 1988
- Teams: 14
- Winners: Hawthorn (1st title)
- Matches played: 13
- Attendance: 155,035 (average 11,926 per match)

The 1988 VFL National Panasonic Cup was the Victorian Football League Pre-season Cup competition played in its entirety before the Victorian Football League's 1988 Premiership Season began. It culminated the final in March 1988. This was the first of the night premierships to be played entirely in the pre-season.

== Games ==
=== 1st Round ===
Home team	Home team score	Away team	Away team score	Ground	Crowd	Date
Fitzroy	14.10 (94)	Footscray	7.13 (55)	VFL Park	8,921	Wednesday 10 February
Carlton	5.8 (38)	Richmond	15.3 (93)	VFL Park	14,185	Saturday 13 February
Geelong	12.7 (79)	St Kilda	7.17 (59)	VFL Park	-	Sunday 14 February
Hawthorn	16.9 (105)	Brisbane	12.8 (80)	VFL Park	-	Sunday 14 February
Collingwood	16.13 (109)	North Melbourne	11.9 (75)	VFL Park	13,938	Wednesday 17 February
West Coast	19.14 (128)	Sydney	5.11 (41)	WACA Ground	12,587	Saturday 20 February

=== Quarter-finals ===
Home team	Home team score	Away team	Away team score	Ground	Crowd	Date
Fitzroy	18.10 (118)	Melbourne	13.8 (86)	VFL Park	10,273	Wednesday 24 February
Geelong	15.18 (108)	Richmond	9.7 (61)	VFL Park	11,813	Saturday 27 February
Collingwood	11.10 (76)	Hawthorn	14.9 (93)	VFL Park	17,433	Wednesday 9 March
Essendon	14.12 (96)	West Coast	8.12 (60)	VFL Park	5,992	Saturday 12 March

=== Semi-finals ===
Home team	Home team score	Away team	Away team score	Ground	Crowd	Date
Fitzroy	5.6 (36)	Geelong	8.16 (64)	VFL Park	8,596	Wednesday 16 March
Essendon	9.7 (61)	Hawthorn	15.14 (104)	VFL Park	15,494	Saturday 19 March

=== Final ===
Home team	Home team score	Away team	Away team score	Ground	Crowd	Date
Geelong	9.13 (67)	Hawthorn	10.10 (70)	VFL Park	35,803	Saturday 26 March

== See also ==
- List of Australian Football League night premiers
- 1988 VFL season
