= 1991 Foster's Cup =

- AFL pre-season competition
- Season: 1991
- Teams: 15
- Winners: Hawthorn (2nd title)
- Matches played: 14
- Attendance: 220,847 (average 15,775 per match)

The 1991 AFL Foster's Cup was the Australian Football League pre-season cup competition played in its entirety before the 1991 season began.

== Games ==
=== 1st Round ===
| Home team | Home team score | Away team | Away team score | Ground | Crowd | Date |
|---|---|---|---|---|---|---|
| Carlton | 27.9 (171) | Fitzroy | 13.8 (86) | North Hobart Oval | 10,100 | Sunday, 3 February |
| Footscray | 9.6 (60) | Hawthorn | 19.25 (139) | Waverley Park | 13,196 | Wednesday, 6 February |
| Collingwood | 11.17 (83) | Brisbane | 20.20 (140) | Gabba | 12,461 | Sunday, 10 February |
| Geelong | 11.13 (79) | Adelaide | 23.18 (156) | Football Park | 20,069 | Wednesday, 13 February |
| St Kilda | 12.10 (82) | West Coast | 9.11 (65) | Waverley Park | 13,625 | Saturday, 16 February |
| Melbourne | 15.13 (103) | Richmond | 12.10 (82) | Waverley Park | 14,993 | Wednesday, 20 February |
| North Melbourne | 19.20 (134) | Sydney | 13.17 (95) | Bruce Stadium | 5,120 | Sunday, 24 February |

=== Quarter-finals ===
| Home team | Home team score | Away team | Away team score | Ground | Crowd | Date |
|---|---|---|---|---|---|---|
| Carlton | 14.15 (99) | Essendon | 17.7 (109) | Waverley Park | 20,435 | Saturday, 23 February |
| Hawthorn | 17.15 (117) | Brisbane | 10.8 (68) | Waverley Park | 8,070 | Wednesday, 27 February |
| St Kilda | 10.16 (76) | Adelaide | 12.14 (86) | Waverley Park | 16,729 | Saturday, 2 March |
| Melbourne | 11.14 (80) | North Melbourne | 13.12 (90) | Waverley Park | 9,030 | Sunday, 3 March |

=== Semi-finals ===
| Home team | Home team score | Away team | Away team score | Ground | Crowd | Date |
|---|---|---|---|---|---|---|
| Essendon | 6.11 (47) | Hawthorn | 22.17 (149) | Waverley Park | 20,508 | Wednesday, 6 March |
| North Melbourne | 15.13 (103) | Adelaide | 6.9 (45) | Waverley Park | 9,882 | Saturday, 9 March |

=== Final ===
| Home team | Home team score | Away team | Away team score | Ground | Crowd | Date |
|---|---|---|---|---|---|---|
| Hawthorn | 14.19 (103) | North Melbourne | 7.12 (54) | Waverley Park | 46,629 | Saturday, 16 March |

== See also ==
- List of Australian Football League night premiers
- 1991 AFL season
