= Marrara Oval =

Stadium in Darwin, Australia

Marrara Stadium

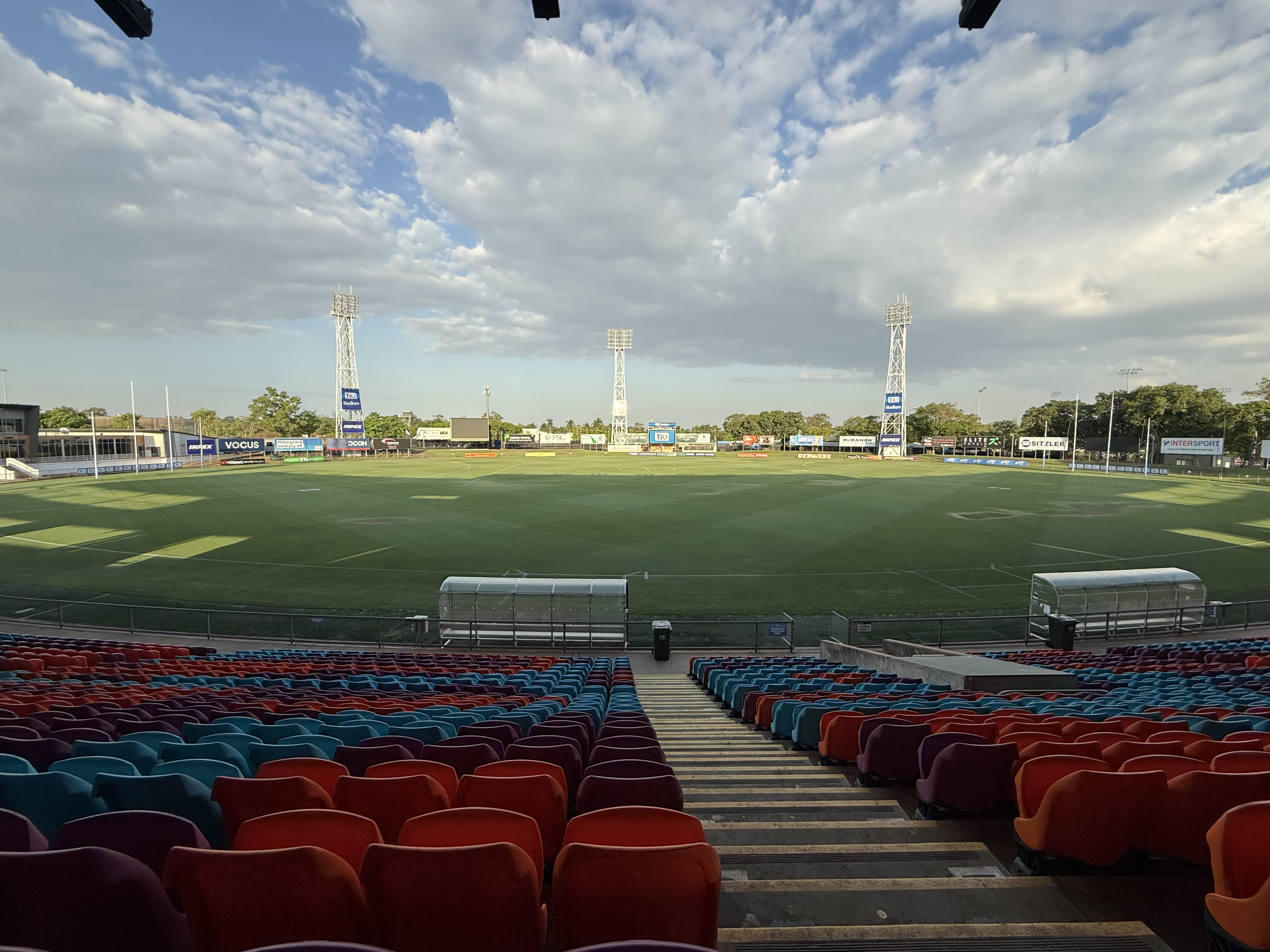
- Interactive map of Marrara Stadium
- Former names: Football Park
- Location: Marrara, Northern Territory
- Coordinates: 12°23′57″S 130°53′14″E
- Owner: Northern Territory Government
- Operator: AFL Northern Territory
- Capacity: 12,215
- Surface: Grass
- Field size: 175 m × 135 m (574 ft × 443 ft)

Construction
- Opened: 1991; 35 years ago

Tenants
- Sydney Roosters (NRL) (2012); Gold Coast Titans (NRL) (2013); Parramatta Eels (NRL) (2014–2025); Dolphins (NRL) (2026–present); 2017 Rugby League World Cup (2017); Wanderers (NTFL) (1991–present); St Marys (NTFL) (1991–present); Darwin Buffaloes (NTFL) (1991–2025); NT Thunder (QAFL/NEAFL/VFLW) (2009–2019); Western Bulldogs (AFL) (2004–2010, 2012–2013); Richmond Football Club (AFL) (2011); Melbourne Football Club (AFL) (2010–2019); Gold Coast Suns (AFL) (2020–present); Adelaide Football Club (AFLW) (2017–2019); NT Thunder Academy (Talent League) (2000–2016, 2019, 2021–present)

Ground information
- End names
- McMillans Road End; Airport End

International information
- First men's Test: 18–20 July 2003: Australia v Bangladesh
- Last men's Test: 13–16 August 2026: Australia v Bangladesh
- First men's ODI: 6 August 2003: Australia v Bangladesh
- Last men's ODI: 6 September 2008: Australia v Bangladesh
- First men's T20I: 10 August 2025: Australia v South Africa
- Last men's T20I: 12 August 2025: Australia v South Africa
- As of 28 May 2020; Source: Cricinfo

Marrara Stadium (known under naming rights as TIO Stadium) is a multi-purpose stadium in the Darwin suburb of Marrara. With a seating capacity of 12,215, it is the largest stadium in the Northern Territory and primarily hosts Australian rules football, cricket, soccer and rugby league.

The stadium was opened in 1991. It has a record attendance of 17,500, set in 2003 for an Australian rules football game featuring the Indigenous All-Stars. Marrara Oval has hosted at least one Australian Football League (AFL) game in every season since 2004 and at least one National Rugby League (NRL) game in every season since 2012. The ground has also hosted both Test, One Day International (ODI) and T20I cricket fixtures, most recently in 2026.

== History ==
=== Australian rules football ===
Marrara Stadium was officially opened to the public on 30 June 1991 as the new home of the Northern Territory Football League (NTFL), and was conservatively estimated as costing $8 million. The first game played under lights at Marrara was a match between Nightcliff and Southern Districts on 9 December 1994. Transport and Works Minister Daryl Manzie officially handed over the lights to the NTFL that day. Installing the lights cost $1.2 million. The light towers were constructed by Darwin firm Norbuilt.

In February 1992, Marrara Stadium hosted its first match sanctioned by the Australian Football League (AFL), a preseason Foster's Cup fixture between Collingwood and West Coast attended by 11,000 people. Further preseason fixtures were hosted at the ground over the next decade, including several Indigenous All-Stars games and a historic match between Essendon Bombers and West Coast Eagles in the AFL 2000 pre-season where Essendon went on to win the Ansett Cup. A 2003 match between the Indigenous All-Stars and Carlton attracted a crowd of 17,500 people, setting a new ground record. The first regular-season AFL match played at Marrara Stadium came in round 20 of the 2004 season, when the Western Bulldogs hosted Port Adelaide.

Between 2004 and 2008 a single Western Bulldogs "home" game was played at the ground each season. In 2010, Melbourne also began to play an annual "home" fixture in Darwin. The Western Bulldogs onsold their 2011 fixture to Richmond, but returned for the 2012 and 2013 seasons. Port Adelaide also had a three-year deal with the Northern Territory government and Marrara Stadium, in which they would be the "away" team for games at the stadium each year between 2009 and 2012. Since 2014, only one AFL game has been played at the stadium each year. From 2020, Gold Coast will play two home games a year at the stadium, replacing Melbourne.

Marrara Stadium has been a secondary home ground of the Adelaide Crows women's team since 2017. In April 2016, the Adelaide Crows launched a successful bid to enter a team in the inaugural AFL Women's season. The bid was constructed in partnership with AFLNT, with the club to share resources and facilities between its Adelaide base and AFLNT's Darwin location. It included a commitment to host some home games in Darwin.

In 2020, Marrara Stadium hosted the annual Dreamtime at the 'G match between Essendon and Richmond as it was not possible for the match to be played at the Melbourne Cricket Ground due to the city of Melbourne, and ultimately the state of Victoria, being locked down during the ongoing COVID-19 pandemic.

==== AFL records ====
- Highest team score:
  - 26.8 (164) – Gold Coast vs. Geelong, 16 May 2024
- Largest winning margin:
  - 93 points – Western Bulldogs vs. Port Adelaide, 13 June 2009
- Lowest team score:
  - 4.3 (27) – Gold Coast vs. Carlton, 21 August 2020
- Most goals kicked:
  - 22 – Ben King (Gold Coast)
- Most goals in a game:
  - 5 on nine occasions
    - Brendan Fevola, Carlton vs. Western Bulldogs, 18 June 2005
    - Brad Johnson, Western Bulldogs vs. Fremantle, 16 June 2007
    - Brad Miller, Melbourne vs. Port Adelaide, 22 May 2010
    - Paul Stewart, Port Adelaide vs. Melbourne, 21 July 2012
    - Jack Darling, West Coast vs. Melbourne, 4 July 2015
    - Jack Lukosius, Gold Coast vs. Western Bulldogs, 27 May 2023
    - Jack Lukosius, Gold Coast vs. Adelaide, 3 June 2023
    - Bailey Humphrey, Gold Coast vs. Geelong, 16 May 2024
    - Jack Lukosius, Gold Coast vs. Geelong, 16 May 2024
- Most disposals in a game:
  - 42 – Noah Anderson, Gold Coast vs. Geelong, 16 May 2024

=== Cricket ===
Marrara Stadium has hosted top-level international cricket on several occasions. In July 2003, the ground hosted the first Test of a series between Australia and Bangladesh. A One Day International (ODI) game between the same teams was played the following month. In July 2004, a second Test was played, the first of a series between Australia and Sri Lanka. After that, top-level international cricket did not return to Marrara Oval until mid-2008, when the ground hosted a three-ODI series between Australia and Bangladesh. In 2025, the stadium hosted its first ever T20Is, between Australia and South Africa. In 2026, the stadium will host the two-match test series between Australia and Bangladesh after 18 years.

==== International centuries ====
Four Test, one ODI and one T20I centuries have been scored at the venue.

===== Tests =====
No.	Score	Player	Team	Balls	Innings	Opposing team	Start Date	Result
1	110	Darren Lehmann	Australia	221	2	Bangladesh	18 July 2003	Australia won
2	100*	Steve Waugh	Australia	133	2	Bangladesh	18 July 2003	Australia won
3	101	Tanzid Hasan	Bangladesh	197	2	Australia	13 August 2026	Bangladesh won
4	104	Cameron Green	Australia	201	3	Bangladesh	13 August 2026	Australia Lost

===== ODIs =====
No.	Score	Player	Team	Balls	Innings	Opposing team	Date	Result
1	101	Ricky Ponting	Australia	118	1	Bangladesh	6 August 2003	Won

===== T20Is =====
No.	Score	Player	Team	Balls	Innings	Opposing team	Date	Result
1	121	Dewald Brevis	South Africa	56	1	Australia	12 August 2025	Won

==== International five-wicket hauls ====
Seven Test five-wicket hauls have been taken at the venue.

No.	Figures	Player	Team	Opposing team	Start Date	Result
1	5/65	Stuart MacGill	Australia	Bangladesh	18 July 2003	Australia won
2	5/31	Chaminda Vaas	Sri Lanka	Australia	1 July 2004	Sri Lanka lost
3	5/37	Glenn McGrath	Australia	Sri Lanka	1 July 2004	Australia won
4	7/39	Michael Kasprowicz	Australia	Sri Lanka	1 July 2004	Australia won
5	6/55	Hasan Mahmud	Bangladesh	Australia	13 August 2026	Bangladesh won
6	6/89	Josh Hazlewood	Australia	Bangladesh	13 August 2026	Australia Lost
7	5/66	Mehidy Hasan Miraz	Bangladesh	Australia	13 August 2026	Bangladesh won

=== Rugby league ===
In the National Rugby League (NRL), the Sydney Roosters played host against the North Queensland Cowboys in Round 7 of the 2012 NRL season in front of 10,008 fans. This was the first time Darwin hosted a professional Rugby League game since 1995. The second game at Marrara came in Round 17 of the 2013 NRL season when the Penrith Panthers (who had previously played games in Darwin during the 1990s) defeated the Gold Coast Titans 40–18 in front of 8,050 for what was a Titans home game.

In 2014, the Parramatta Eels, a Sydney-based National Rugby League (NRL) club, announced they would be playing four games at Marrara over the following four years. The first game came on 9 August (Round 22) during the 2014 NRL season when the Eels defeated the Canberra Raiders 18–10 in front of 9,527 fans.

In 2017 Marrara Stadium hosted a quarter-final of the 2017 Rugby League World Cup between Australia and Samoa, Australia winning 46–0. It drew a crowd of 13,473, which is the highest rugby league crowd the stadium has ever gotten and the fourth highest overall.

On 18 November 2024, it was announced that Parramatta's 12-year long partnership with the Northern Territory Government, which say the club play one home game a year in Darwin, would conclude in the 2025 NRL season, with Parramatta's last game a 12–50 defeat to the Canberra Raiders in round 6 in front of a crowd of 9556.

In May 2025, it was announced that the Dolphins would play one home game a year at the ground for the next 3 years.

== Other events ==
The stadium has hosted AC/DC for their "Ballbreaker" tour in November 1996, when 13,000 fans and 170 tonnes of equipment packed the ground. Sir Elton John performed for the first time in the Northern Territory, at TIO Stadium on 17 May 2008 as part of his Australian Tour.

== AFL records ==
=== Individual ===
Most career games by a player
Games	Player	Club	Years
10	Kane Cornes	Port Adelaide	2004–2013
10	Danyle Pearce	Port Adelaide	2006–2016
9	Nathan Jones	Melbourne	2009–2018
9	Tom Logan	Port Adelaide	2006–2013

Most career goals by a player
Goals	Player	Club	Games
22	Ben King	Gold Coast	9
17	Brad Johnson	Western Bulldogs	7
15	Jack Lukosius	Gold Coast/Port Adelaide	6
10	Mitch Hahn	Western Bulldogs	5
8	Daniel Giansiracusa	Western Bulldogs	6
8	Robbie Gray	Port Adelaide	5

^{Last updated: 16 June 2026}

== Attendance records ==
Top 10 sports attendance records
No.	Date	Teams	Sport	Competition	Crowd
1	7 February 2003	Indigenous All-Stars vs. Carlton	Australian rules football	n/a	17,500
2	12 February 1994	Indigenous All-Stars vs. Collingwood	Australian rules football	n/a	15,000
3	12 August 2006	Western Bulldogs vs. Port Adelaide	Australian rules football	AFL	14,100
4	17 November 2017	Australia vs. Samoa	Rugby league	2017 RLWC	13,473
5	14 August 2004	Western Bulldogs vs. Port Adelaide	Australian rules football	AFL	13,271
6	11 February 2007	Indigenous All-Stars vs. Essendon	Australian rules football	n/a	13,119
7	18 June 2005	Western Bulldogs vs. Carlton	Australian rules football	AFL	13,037
8	17 April 2026	Dolphins vs. Penrith Panthers	Rugby League	NRL	12,570
9	16 May 2024	Gold Coast vs. Geelong	Australian rules football	AFL	12,112
10	15 July 2017	Melbourne vs. Adelaide	Australian rules football	AFL	12,104

^{Last updated on 9 May 2026}

== See also ==
- List of Test cricket grounds
