= Robb =

Robb is a surname of Scottish origin, formed from a diminution (reduction) of the name Robert. Robert was a popular name, especially after its use by three Scots Kings in the fourteenth century. Rob is first recorded as a surname in the mid-15th century, with several individuals recorded in the decades either side of 1500. As the 16th century progressed there were early groupings in Aberdeenshire, Lanarkshire and later in Perthshire/Stirlingshire. It is likely that the name originated with the offspring of a Robert or Rob, when surnames began to flourish, but unlike some surnames there is no one source for the name.

The surname was originally spelled Rob, sometimes Robe, but by 1800 the vast majority of families had added an extra 'b' in common with some other three letter surnames e.g. Hog to Hogg. Despite a number of early English families named Robe, Robb, Robbe and Robbes the surname did not develop in the same way as it did in Scotland. Robe or Robbe is a popular surname in Germany, Holland, Belgium and France and also mainly derives from a diminution of Robert. Rob is also a surname in Slovenia, Croatia and the Czech Republic although the derivation is different. Rob also appears as a popular surname in Bangladesh and Kenya, but again the derivation is different.

Although the surname originates in Scotland, Protestant branches of the family settled in Ireland during the sixteenth century Plantations, with the earliest record of the name appearing in Protestant Muster Rolls in the early 1630s. The Robb of Timpany family is thought to have originated with one James Robb who in the late seventeenth century was said to have been a chief mason of the King's Works in Ireland and an assistant of Inigo Jones. A descendant Captain James Robb built Timpany House in 1780. Sir William Robe (1765-1820) of the Royal Artillery was granted Arms in Ireland in 1814, with a recorded descent from James Robe of Augrim, his great-grandfather. The Lord Lyon in Scotland granted Arms in 1809, to a Bristol merchant, the grandson of the Reverend James Robe of Kilsyth (1688–1753), son of Reverend Michael Rob of Cumbernauld (1645–1721). Their Coat of Arms descends from the Hamilton of Boggs family through marriage.

The Robb Arms are recorded as a 'Paly of eight arg and az, a canton gu' in the early C19th, but it does not appear to have been formally adopted. The Robb crest shows a bare arm holding a chapeau surrounded with a laurel wreath. The vast majority of Robb Crests and 'Coats of Arms' advertised on the internet are false.

It appears that many Robbs emigrated to the New World from Ireland, rather than Scotland. Amongst Scottish settlers, there were three Jacobite soldiers (from Angus and Midlothian) transported to America following the Jacobite rising of 1715, and the first Free Church of Scotland Minister to settle in Canada was the Rev. Ralph Robb (1800–1850) a native of Logie parish near Stirling. The William Robb House in Charleston was built in 1858 by the son of a Scots settler, also from Logie parish. The wealthy merchant and politician, James Hampden Robb, was the son of James Robb a New Orleans banker, himself the son of Samuel Robb (d.1819) from Pennsylvania. He is known to have used the arms recorded above.

The name is often recorded as a sept of the Clan MacFarlane who were based historically on the eastern side of Loch Lomond, but this only stems from an early inclusion of the surname MacRobb, (which is a Highland surname), as a MacFarlane sept. It is unlikely there was ever any link between the, largely, lowland surname and the highland clan.

It is the 192nd (equal) most popular surname in Scotland, judging by births, marriages and deaths in 2018.

People with the surname Robb include:

- Alfred Robb (1873–1935), Irish physicist
- Andrew Robb (born 1951), Australian politician
- AnnaSophia Robb (born 1993), American actress, model, and singer
- Archimedes Robb (1814–1875), American politician
- Bruce Robb (born 1954), American record producer
- Candace Robb (born 1959), American author
- Carole Robb (born 1943), Scottish painter
- Chuck Robb (born 1939), American politician
- Curtis Robb (born 1972), British middle-distance runner
- David Robb (born 1947), British actor
- Douglas Robb (disambiguation)
- Ed Robb (1942–2011), American politician
- George Robb (disambiguation)
- Graham Robb (born 1958), British author
- Ian Robb, English folk singer
- Isabel Hampton Robb (1860–1910), American nursing theorist
- J. D. Robb, Nora Roberts
- J. Hampden Robb (1846–1911), New York politician
- James Robb (disambiguation)
- John Robb (disambiguation)
- Lynda Bird Johnson Robb (born 1944), elder daughter of former American president Lyndon Baines Johnson
- Mary Lee Robb (1926–2006), American actress
- Michael P. Robb, American speech-language pathologist
- Monica Robb Blasdel, American politician
- Muriel Robb (1878–1907), British tennis player
- Natalie J. Robb (born 1974), Scottish actress
- Noël Robb (1913–2009), South African activist
- Paul Robb (born 1963), American musician
- Peter Robb (disambiguation)
- Rafael Robb (born 1950), American economist
- Ralph Robb (1800–1850), Scottish clergyman
- Richard Robb (1901–1977) Scottish statistician and athlete in the 1928 Olympics
- Robert Robb (1882–1941), British athlete at the 1908 Summer Olympics
- Steven Robb (born 1982), Scottish footballer
- Thomas Robb (disambiguation)

== See also ==
- Rob (disambiguation)
