= 2009 AFL Army Award =

For main article please see: AFL Army Award

The Australian Football League celebrates the best act of selflessness or one percenter of the season through the annual AFL Army Award competition. The 2009 winner was Tom Hawkins of Geelong for his "brilliant smother followed by chase and tackle" in round 22.

== Nominations and winners ==
2009 AFL Army Award nominations
Nominee	Club	% of votes	Opponent	Description
Round 1
Zac Dawson	St Kilda	29%	Sydney	Strong shepherd on Sydney Swan hard man Barry Hall.
James Kelly	Geelong	67%	Hawthorn	Multiple efforts before tapping ball into the path of a team mate.
Joel Macdonald	Brisbane Lions	4%	West Coast	Brilliant smother.

Round	Report	Nominees	Team	% of Votes	Match	Note
2	Nominations	Aaron Davey	Melbourne	24%	Collingwood v Melbourne	Brilliant chase down tackle on Marty Clarke
2	Nominations	Campbell Brown	Hawthorn	51%	Sydney vs Hawthorn	Courageous smother in front of goal
2	Nominations	Ben McKinley	West Coast	25%	West Coast vs Port Adelaide	Fantastic chase and tackle
3	Nominations	Eric MacKenzie	West Coast	9%	St Kilda vs West Coast	Brilliant slide on the goal line to save a goal
3	Nominations	Luke Ball	St Kilda	82%	St Kilda vs West Coast	Great diving smother on Quinten Lynch
3	Nominations	Nathan Eagleton	Western Bulldogs	9%	Western Bulldogs vs Richmond	Persistent spoil and tackle
4	Nominations	Luke Hodge	Hawthorn	21%	Hawthorn vs Port Adelaide	Persistent chase and tackle on Tom Logan
4	Nominations	Eric MacKenzie	West Coast	35%	West Coast vs Western Bulldogs	Great smother in front of goal
4	Nominations	Ricky Dyson	Essendon	44%	North Melbourne vs Essendon	Courageous chase and tackle on Drew Petrie
5	Nominations	Shane O'Bree	Collingwood	10%	Essendon vs Collingwood	Skillful tackle to gain possession and tap on to a teammate.
5	Nominations	Drew Petrie	North Melbourne	11%	North Melbourne vs Richmond	Courageous chase and tackle
5	Nominations	Lenny Hayes	St Kilda	79%	Port Adelaide vs St Kilda	Gutsy diving smother
6	Nominations	Joel Macdonald	Brisbane Lions	17%	Brisbane Lions vs Essendon	Showed courage when executing a spoil
6	Nominations	Martin Mattner	Sydney	58%	Sydney vs Richmond	Brilliant chase and tackle on Jack Riewoldt
6	Nominations	Luke Hodge	Hawthorn	25%	Hawthorn vs Carlton	Spoiled, tackled then handballed to team mate
7	Nominations	Daniel Cross	Western Bulldogs	12%	Adelaide vs Western Bulldogs	Clinical smother on Tyson Edwards
7	Nominations	Jared Rivers	Melbourne	38%	West Coast vs Melbourne	Extremely courageous attempt to mark
7	Nominations	Bryce Gibbs	Carlton	50%	Carlton vs Fremantle	Great chase and tackle on Luke McPharlin
8	Nominations	Barry Hall	Sydney	60%	Sydney vs West Coast	Courageous spoil, then tap to team mate
8	Nominations	Heath Scotland	Carlton	23%	Collingwood vs Carlton	Phenomenal courage when spoiling a mark
8	Nominations	Nathan Lovett-Murray	Essendon	17%	St Kilda vs Essendon	Three efforts then tackled causing a turnover
9	Nominations	Mark Austin	Carlton	24%	Adelaide vs Carlton	Multiple spoils followed by dual tackles
9	Nominations	Michael Osborne	Hawthorn	16%	Hawthorn vs Melbourne	Effective support and shepherding
9	Nominations	Matt White	Richmond	60%	Richmond vs Essendon	Fast paced chase and tackle
10	Nominations	Travis Varcoe	Geelong	67%	Essendon vs Geelong	Double tackle and smother
10	Nominations	Antoni Grover	Fremantle	20%	Fremantle vs Richmond	Defensive spoil in mid flight
10	Nominations	Daniel Rich	Brisbane Lions	13%	North Melbourne vs Brisbane Lions	Courageous spoil
11	Nominations	Adam Simpson	North Melbourne	27%	North Melbourne vs St Kilda	Brilliant smother on Jason Gram
11	Nominations	Scott McMahon	North Melbourne	54%	North Melbourne vs St Kilda	Courageous smother on Clinton Jones
11	Nominations	Ben McGlynn	Hawthorn	19%	Hawthorn vs Sydney	Gutsy chase and dive to spoil Michael O'Loughlin
12	Nominations	Darren Glass	West Coast	25%	Richmond vs West Coast	Diving smother to spoil Tom Hislop
12	Nominations	Brad Green	Melbourne	43%	Essendon vs Melbourne	Gutsy attempt to spoil the mark
12	Nominations	Dean Solomon	Fremantle	32%	Fremantle vs Geelong	Courageous dive on the ball
13	Nominations	Dustin Fletcher	Essendon	12%	Essendon vs Carlton	Spoiled a mark then smothered a kick
13	Nominations	Alwyn Davey	Essendon	12%	Essendon vs Carlton	Chase-down and tackle
13	Nominations	Patrick Dangerfield	Adelaide	76%	Adelaide vs Sydney	Smother resulting in a pivotal goal
14	Nominations	Josh Hill	Western Bulldogs	23%	Western Bulldogs vs Hawthorn	Strong spoil of an overhead, chase and tackle
14	Nominations	Ryan Griffen	Western Bulldogs	47%	Western Bulldogs vs Hawthorn	Brilliant goal saving smother
14	Nominations	Brett Ebert	Port Adelaide	30%	Port Adelaide vs Brisbane Lions	Courageous chase and tackle to turnover for a goal
15	Nominations	Nathan Eagleton	Western Bulldogs	47%	Western Bulldogs vs Collingwood	Courageous interception running back in full flight
15	Nominations	Michael Hurley	Essendon	30%	Sydney vs Essendon	Gutsy goal saving smother
15	Nominations	Tayte Pears	Essendon	23%	Sydney vs Essendon	Strong chase down and tackle
16	Nominations	Jake King	Richmond	22%	Richmond vs North Melbourne	Gutsy double tackle resulting in turnover
16	Nominations	James Frawley	Melbourne	11%	Geelong vs Melbourne	Strong chase down and tackle
16	Nominations	Jacob Surjan	Port Adelaide	67%	Port Adelaide vs West Coast	Courageous smother in front of goal
17	Nominations	Tim Ruffles	Fremantle	27%	Fremantle vs West Coast	Courageous attempt to mark running with the flight
17	Nominations	Nick Riewoldt	St Kilda	20%	St Kilda vs Western Bulldogs	Great second effort to smother
17	Nominations	Cameron Mooney	Geelong	53%	Geelong vs Hawthorn	Fearless marking attempt
18	Nominations	Aaron Davey	Melbourne	37%	Melbourne vs Richmond	Takes on two Richmond opponents and wins possession
18	Nominations	Darren Glass	West Coast	31%	West Coast vs Essendon	Strong defensive effort and smother to save a certain goal
18	Nominations	Ryan Griffen	Western Bulldogs	32%	Western Bulldogs vs Fremantle	Great 100m chase and tackle against Fremantle's Grover
19	Nominations	Jarrod Atkinson	Essendon	19%	Essendon vs Brisbane Lions	Athletic smother and rebound from Essendon's defence
19	Nominations	Dustin Fletcher	Essendon	24%	Essendon vs Brisbane Lions	Strong spoil, great second effort smother and clearance
19	Nominations	Brett Kirk	Sydney	57%	Richmond vs Sydney	Won a contested ball, then tapped to teammates advantage
20	Nominations	Lance Franklin	Hawthorn	10%	Hawthorn vs Adelaide	Fantastic chase and tackle halting an Adelaide attack
20	Nominations	Richard Tambling	Richmond	32%	Richmond vs Collingwood	Wonderful chase and smother to win possession
20	Nominations	Stephen Milne	St Kilda	58%	Essendon vs St Kilda	Great smother to create a turnover then goal
21	Nominations	Max Rooke	Geelong	72%	Western Bulldogs vs Geelong	Multiple strong tackles resulting in a turnover
21	Nominations	Drew Petrie	North Melbourne	15%	North Melbourne vs St Kilda	Launched himself in the air to spoil
21	Nominations	Jarred Moore	Sydney	13%	Collingwood vs Sydney	Courageous knock-on resulting in a goal
22	Nominations	Tom Hawkins	Geelong		Geelong vs Fremantle	Brilliant smother followed by chase and tackle

**	Current Round - voting still open
	Round Winner

== Finalists ==
- Luke Ball (St Kilda) – round 3
- Martin Mattner (Sydney) – round 6
- Brad Green (Melbourne) – round 12
- Nathan Eagleton (Western Bulldogs) – round 15
- Jacob Surjan (Port Adelaide) – round 16
- Winner: Tom Hawkins (Geelong) – round 22

== See also ==
- AFL Army Award
- 2009 AFL Goal of the Year
- 2009 AFL Mark of the Year
- 2009 AFL season
