= Robb (disambiguation) =

Robb is a surname. Robb or Robbs may also refer to:

== Places ==
- Robb, Alberta, Canada, a hamlet
- Robb Glacier, Ross Dependency, Antarctica
- Robb Township, Posey County, Indiana, United States

== People ==
- Robb (given name), a list of people
- Robb Banks, stage name of American hip hop artist Richard Burrel (born 1994)

== Other uses ==
- Robb Engineering, a Canadian former manufacturing company
- Robbs, a former department store in Hexham, England
- The Robbs, an American 1960s pop and rock band

== See also ==
- Rob (disambiguation)
