= 2007 AFL Army Award =

For main article please see: AFL Army Award

The Australian Football League celebrates the best act of selflessness or one percenter of the season through the annual AFL Army Award competition.

== Winners by round ==
Legend

- Winner of round in BLUE

| Round | Report | Nominees | Team | % of Votes | Match | Note |
|---|---|---|---|---|---|---|
| 1 | Nominations | Domenic Cassisi | Port Adelaide | 10% | Fremantle vs Port Adelaide | Smother to save the game |
| 1 | Nominations | Nathan Bassett | Adelaide | 21% | Adelaide vs Essendon | Tackle and smother |
| 1 | Nominations | Daniel Kerr | West Coast | 69% | Sydney Swans vs West Coast Eagles | Tackle on Jarrad McVeigh in last minute as he was about to kick for goal with the Eagles 1 point up. |
| 2 | Nominations | Brett Kirk | Sydney | 43% | Richmond vs Sydney | Desperate attack on the ball to win a free kick. |
| 2 | Nominations | Michael Firrito | Port Adelaide | 28% | Port Adelaide vs Kangaroos | 3rd-quarter goal-saving tackle. |
| 2 | Nominations | Jed Adcock | Brisbane | 29% | Brisbane vs St. Kilda | Good defensive spoil. |
| 3 | Nominations Winner | Chad Cornes | Port Adelaide | 21% | Port Adelaide vs Adelaide | Handballing off a ball he won in a smother. |
| 3 | Nominations Winner | Brendan Fevola | Carlton | 45% | Carlton vs Essendon | Chase by the full-forward to spoil the disposal of Andrew Lovett. |
| 3 | Nominations Winner | David Rodan | Port Adelaide | 34% | Port Adelaide vs Adelaide | Last-quarter diving smother. |
| 4 | Nominations | Lindsay Gilbee | Western Bulldogs | 12% | Ruchmond vs Western Bulldogs | 2nd-Quarter Diving Smother |
| 4 | Nominations | Chad Cornes | Port Adelaide | 40% | Collingwood vs Port Adelaide | Last-quarter lunging tackle. |
| 4 | Nominations | Alwyn Davey | Essendon | 48% | St. Kilda vs Essendon | Chase and tackle by the speedster resulting in a Matthew Lloyd goal. |
| 5 | Nominations Winner | Richard Tambling | Richmond | 28% | Richmond vs West Coast | Diving smother in his defensive 50. |
| 5 | Nominations Winner | Jordan Lewis | Hawthorn | 32% | Hawthorn vs Western Bulldogs | 1st-Quarter diving spoil & second effort |
| 5 | Nominations Winner | Robert Shirley | Adelaide | 40% | Fremantle vs Adelaide | Spoil of ball deep in defence late in an extremely close game. |
| 6 | Nominations Winner | Shane Crawford | Hawthorn | 18% | Essendon vs Hawthorn | Chase and tacle on Brent Stanton. |
| 6 | Nominations Winner | Glenn Archer | Kangaroos | 16% | Kangaroos vs Sydney Swans | 3rd-Quarter diving spoil. |
| 6 | Nominations Winner | Alwyn Davey | Essendon | 66% | Essendon vs Hawthorn | Diving smother followed by two other efforts. |
| 7 | Nominations | Chad Cornes | Port Adelaide | 37% | Port Adelaide vs Richmond | Defensive desperation preventing Matthew Richardson scoring a goal for Richmond. |
| 7 | Nominations | Joel Bowden | Richmond | 35% | Port Adelaide vs Richmond | Spoil whilst moving backward with the flight of the ball. |
| 7 | Nominations | Chris Tarrant | Fremantle | 28% | Fremantle vs Hawthorn | Good chase & tackle by the Fremantle forward. |
| 8 | Nominations Winner | Alwyn Davey | Essendon | 58% | Essendon vs Brisbane | Brilliant chase & tackle on Cheynee Stiller. |
| 8 | Nominations Winner | Daniel Pratt | Kangaroos | 27% | Kangaroos vs Carlton | Gutsy attempt to spoil & recovery of the ball to dispose of it to a teammate. |
| 8 | Nominations Winner | Brian Harris | Western Bulldogs | 15% | Western Bulldogs vs Collingwood | Great run, spoil and handball. |
| 9 | Winner | Chance Bateman | Hawthorn | 20% | Hawthorn vs West Coast Eagles | Good smother. |
| 9 | Winner | James Hird | Essendon | 55% | Richmond vs Essendon | Tackle on the 2nd effort produced a goal from point blank range in an extremely close finish. |
| 9 | Winner | Josh Gibson | Kangaroos | 25% | Melbourne vs Kangaroos | Goal saving tackle near the end of a game that resulted in a 1 point win. |
| 10 | Nominations | Daniel Chick | West Coast Eagles | 57% | West Coast Eagles vc Kangaroos | Two of 4 last-quarter strong tackles. |
| 10 | Nominations | Jed Adcock | Brisbane Lions | 23% | Richmond vs Brisbane Lions | Gutsy defensive spoil on Matthew Richardson in a drawn game. |
| 10 | Nominations | Rhan Hooper | Brisbane Lions | 20% | Richmond vs Brisbane Lions | Chased down and tackled Matthew White in a drawn game. |
| 11 | Nominations | Danny Stanley | Collingwood | 47% | Melbourne vs Collingwood | Rushing a behind in difficult situation in a tight game. |
| 11 | Nominations | Dustin Fletcher | Essendon | 36% | Essendon vs West Coast Eagles | Spoil of ball over boundary in last 10 seconds of game deep in defence whilst leading by 1 point. |
| 11 | Nominations | James Gwilt | St Kilda | 17% | St Kilda vs Kangaroos | Goal-saving tackle. |
| 12 | Nominations | Steven Dodd | Fremantle | 44% | Western Bulldogs vs Fremantle | Chased down Brad Johnson over a long distance. Unfortunately for him Johnson got a handball away and then Dodd accidentally kicked the ball out of bounds on the full. |
| 12 | Nominations | Travis Cloke | Collingwood | 25% | Sydney Swans vs Collingwood | Spoilt a kick in and then followed up with a good tackle. |
| 12 | Nominations | Alan Didak | Collingwood | 31% | Sydney Swans vs Collingwood | Two desperate tackles by Didak on Sydney's Ryan O'Keefe. |
| 13 | Nominations | | Essendon | | Melbourne vs Essendon | Chase and tackle as part of a second effort. |
| 13 | Nominations | Glenn Archer | Kangaroos | 44% | Kangaroos vs Western Bulldogs | Made a contest in a tough situation and made a 2nd effort in his 300th game. |
| 13 | Nominations | Paul Medhurst | Collingwood | | Collingwood vs Hawthorn | Diving tackle after long chase. |
| 14* | Nominations | Matthew Egan | Geelong | 44% | Essendon vs Geelong | Goal-saving diving smother against Essendon |
| 14* | Nominations | Steven Baker | St Kilda | 22% | Collingwood vs St Kilda | Great smother and second effort |
| 14* | Nominations | Nick Maxwell | Collingwood | 34% | Collingwood vs St Kilda | Gutsy spoil moving back with the flight of the ball |

- *Denotes current Round

== See also ==
- AFL Army Award
- 2007 AFL Goal of the Year
- 2007 AFL Mark of the Year
- 2007 AFL Season
