= John Robb =

John Robb may refer to:

- John Robb (1862–1913), Scottish civil engineer
- John Robb (author) (born 1962), American author, military analyst and entrepreneur
- John Robb (civil engineer) (1834–1896), Ireland-born contractor and businessman in Australia
- John Robb (musician) (born 1961), British journalist and vocalist for punk band Goldblade
- John D. Robb, Chairman of the International Prayer Council
- John Donald Robb (1892–1989), American composer and ethnomusicologist
- Jimmy Robb or John "Jimmy" Robb (born 1935), Scottish footballer
- John Robb (surgeon) (1932–2018), Northern Irish surgeon and politician who served in Seanad Éireann, 1982–1989
- John Hanna Robb (1873–1956), Northern Irish politician
- John Morrow Robb (1876–1942), physician and politician in Ontario, Canada
