= List of programmes broadcast by Sky Kids (TV channel) =

Below is a list of television shows broadcast on Sky Kids in the United Kingdom and Ireland. The list also includes shows broadcast on Sky Mix before it was rebranded to Sky Kids in 2026.

== Current programming ==
=== Acquired programming ===
- Bea's Block (2023–present)
- Ready Eddie Go! (2023–present)
- Trolls: TrollsTopia (2023-present)
- Clifford (2023-present)
- 64 Zoo Lane (2023-present)
- Little Princess (2023-2024; 2026-present)
- Norman Picklestripes (2023–2024; 2026–present)
- Let's Go, Bananas! (2024–present)
- Pip and Posy (2023–present)
- Moominvalley (2023–present)
- Simon (2024–present)
- Miffy and Friends (2025–present)
- Tickety Toc (2023-present)
- Do, Re & Mi (2023; 2026-present)
- Isadora Moon (2023–present)
- In the Night Garden... ZinkyZonk Specials (2023–2024; 2026–present)
- The Wiggles (2023–present)
- Wild Kratts (2023–2024; 2026–present)
- Emerald (2025–present)
- The Cat in the Hat Knows a Lot About That! (2026–present)

== Upcoming programming ==
- The Blobs
- Sylvanian Families
- Popples
- Maple Town
- Mr. Men and Little Miss

== Former programming ==
- 123 Number Squad! (2023–2024)
- Abominable and the Invisible City (2023–2024)
- Awesome Animals and Mini Me (2023)
- BabyRiki (2023)
- Big Block Singsong (2023)
- Blippi (2024–2025)
- Care Bears: Unlock the Music (2023–2024)
- CoComelon (2025)
- Cosmic Kids Yoga Adventures (2023-2024)
- Critters TV (2023–2024)
- Earth to Luna! (2023–2024)
- The Epic Adventures of Morph (2023)
- Gecko's Garage (2023)
- Kid-E-Cats (2024)
- Kipper (2025–2026)
- LEGO City Adventures (2025)
- Lil' Stompers (2023-2024)
- Littlest Pet Shop (2023–2024)
- Little Angel (2025)
- Little Baby Bum (2023-2024)
- Madagascar: A Little Wild (2023)
- Mia's Magic Playground (2023–2023)
- Miffy's Adventures Big and Small (2023–2025)
- Mittens & Pants (2023)
- Morph (2023)
- My Little Pony: Friendship Is Magic (2024–2025)
- Oddbods (2024–2025)
- Playdate (2024)
- Power Rangers Dino Thunder (2023)
- Ready Jet Go! (2023–2024)
- Rob the Robot (2024–2025)
- Sam & Julia (2024)
- Silly Pets (2023)
- Snow Snaps (2023)
- The Brilliant World of Tom Gates (2023–2026)
- The Little Prince and Friends (2023)
- The Singalings (2023–2025)
- The Very Small Creatures (2023)
- Transformers: Rescue Bots Academy (2023–2023)
- Where's Wally? (2023–2024)
- Wonder Raps (2023)
- Woozle & Pip (2023)
- Zoonicorn (2023–2024)
