= Tweedside mill =

Corn and woollen mill in Peebles, Scotland

Coordinates: 55.6508°N 3.1939°W

Tweedside Mill in Peebles was originally a corn mill, rebuilt as Peebles' first modern woollen manufacturing mill in 1856 by Thomas Dickson. It was situated on the River Tweed to the west of the Tweed Bridge and below the parish church on Castle Hill.

== History ==
In 1858, the mill was bought by Laing & Irvine. In 1860, they installed mechanical looms, powered by a 15 ft diameter water wheel, at a cost of four thousand pounds. Laing & Irvine failed to run the mill economically and in 1875 it was bought by Walter Thorburn & Bros, a partnership set up in 1869 by Michael and Walter Thorburn, sons of Walter Thorburn, a former Provost of the town. The Thorburn's established Damdale Mill in 1869 with 12 looms and a Yorkshire-born manager Tom Pennington, and they proceeded to build a large warehouse by the station.

The first foreman or manager of Tweedside was Alexander Michie, followed by Mr Liddle. In the late 1870s, Andrew Robb (1825-1900), the Manager of Gaberston Mill in Alloa, was brought in to manage the mill for the Thorburns. In 1881, he was sharing a house with Frederick Morris from Walkerburn, another Thorburn Mill manager - at Damside. The next manager at Tweedside was William Baillie. The Thorburns retained the mill until it was demolished after a serious fire on 12 February 1965. At the time of closing, it employed around 70 people. The site remained empty until the 1980s. In 1982–83, it was replaced by a swimming pool and leisure centre designed by architects Morris & Steadman.
