= Robert (robot name) =

Robots named Robert, Robbie/Robby, Rob, and the like, reflect an alliteration trope in science fiction in which robots are given names starting with the letter "r", and particularly with the phoneme "rob". Isaac Asimov noted this in-universe in the short story, "Christmas Without Rodney", in which a character says: "There's no law about it, but you've probably noticed for yourself that almost every robot has a name beginning with R. R for robot, I suppose. The usual name is Robert. There must be a million robot Roberts in the northeast corridor alone". This trope has appeared not only in the English language, but also in languages such as German and Russian. Robots named following this trope include:

== Actual robots ==
An early nonfictional "robot" named Robert was a briefly popular children's toy introduced at the 1954 New York Toy Fair, called "Robert the Robot".

A humanoid robot named Robert the Robot is launched in 2025, developed by the Swiss fintech company RB Labs.

== Fictional characters ==
- Robby the Robot (character), a science-fiction icon, fictional character, and, robot suit, featured in many U.S. sci-fi movies and television
- Rob the Robot (Rob the Robot), a fictional character from the eponymous TV show Rob the Robot (TV series)
- Robert the Robot (Fireball XL-5), a fictional character from the 1960s marionette TV show Fireball XL-5
- Robbie the Robot (Isaac Asimov), the titular character from the Isaac Asimov short story "Robbie" (short story)
- ROB 64, a robot character in the Star Fox video game series
- Robert, a fictional character in the 1967 Soviet science fiction film His Name Was Robert (Russian: Его звали Роберт, romanized: Ego zvali Robert)
- Roberta, a fictional character in the 1989 film Not Quite Human 2
- Robbie, a dancing robot invented by Brains in the 1971 children's show Here Come the Double Deckers! episode "Robbie the Robot" (1971)
- Robbi, a.k.a. ROB 344–66/IIIa, co-pilot of the Fliewatüüt and student of a third class at robot school, in the 1972 German children's show Robbi, Tobbi und das Fliewatüüt
- Robert the Robot, a main character in the BBC children's television comedy show Justin's House, beginning in 2011
- Robbie, a toy robot that Steve utilizes to spy on Stan in the American Dad! episode "Toy Whorey"
- Robbie, a recurring robot constructed by inventor Knox in German series Fix und Foxi, first drawn by Massimo Fecchi (1976)

== Other uses ==
- Rob the Robot (TV series), a CGI-animated preschooler TV show
- R.O.B., a mid-1980s accessory for the Nintendo Entertainment System that later was used as a cameo character in various video games

== See also ==
- Rosie the Robot, from The Jetsons
- BO. B. LF-28 (pronounced "Bob") a robot in The Black Hole (1979 film)
- Robert (doll), an allegedly haunted doll
- Robert (disambiguation)
- Robbie (disambiguation)
- Robby (disambiguation)
- Rob (disambiguation)
- Robot (disambiguation)
