= Robb (given name) =

Robb is a masculine given name and a short form (hypocorism) of Robert(o) or Robin/Robyn. It is more normally spelt Rob. The name may also refer to:

== People ==
- Robb Akey (born 1966), American college football head coach and National Football League coach
- Robb Butler (born 1981), American former National Football League player
- Robert Robb Cullen (born 1965), American film and television writer, actor and producer
- Robb Forman Dew (born 1946), female American author
- Robert Robb Flynn (born Lawrence Matthew Cardine in 1967), American lead vocalist and guitarist for the heavy metal band Machine Head
- Robb Gravett (born 1956), British retired racing driver and team owner
- Robb Hawkins (born 1957), former Australian rules footballer
- Robb Holland (born 1967), American race car driver
- Robb Johnson (born 1955), British musician and songwriter
- Robb Kahl (born 1972), American lawyer and politician, member of the Wisconsin State Assembly
- Robb Kendrick (born 1963), American photographer
- Robb Nen (born 1969), American former National League Baseball player
- Robb Montgomery (born 1964), Journalist
- Robb Paller (born 1993), American-Israeli baseball player
- Robb Reiner, Canadian drummer, member of Anvil (band)
- Robert Robb Royer (born 1942), American bassist, guitarist, keyboardist and songwriter with the band Bread from 1968 to 1971
- Robb Sapp (born 1978), American stage actor and singer
- Robb Smith (born 1975), American football coach and former player
- Robert Robb Stauber (born 1967), American former National Hockey League goaltender
- Robb Thomas (born 1966), American former National Football League player
- Robert Robb Thompson (born 1953), American founder and president of Family Harvest International, a worldwide network of Christian congregations, and founder of the Family Harvest Church
- Robb Walsh, American food writer, cookbook author and restaurant owner
- Robb Wells (born 1971), Canadian actor and screenwriter
- Robb White (American football) (born 1965), American former National Football League player
- Robb White (1909–1990), American writer of screenplays, television scripts and adventure novels
- Robb Wilton (1881–1957), English comedian and comic actor born Robert Wilton Smith

== Fictional characters ==
- Robb Stark, in the A Song of Ice and Fire fantasy novel series by George R. R. Martin, and its television adaptation, Game of Thrones

== See also ==
- Rob (disambiguation)
- Bobb
