= Robert Shirley (footballer) =

Australian rules footballer (born 1980)

Rob Shirley

Personal information
- Full name: Robert Shirley
- Born: 9 June 1980 (age 46); Adelaide, Australia
- Original team: Woodville-West Torrens (SANFL)
- Draft: 67th overall, 1999; Adelaide
- Height: 185 cm (6 ft 1 in)
- Weight: 85 kg (187 lb)
- Positions: Midfield, tagger

Playing career^{1}
Years	Club	Games (Goals)
2000–2009	Adelaide	151 (28)
- ^{1} Playing statistics correct to the end of 2009.

Robert Shirley (born 9 June 1980) is an Australian rules footballer who played for the Adelaide Football Club in the Australian Football League (AFL). He also played for the Woodville-West Torrens Football Club in the South Australian National Football League (SANFL). Shirley was known as one of the best taggers in the AFL.

== AFL career ==
Originally drafted from Woodville-West Torrens with pick 67 in the 1999 AFL draft, Shirley played 21 games in his first three seasons at the highest level before being delisted at the end of the 2002 AFL season. Despite rumoured interest from Carlton, Shirley was immediately redrafted by the Crows with pick 53 in the 2002 AFL draft and placed on the club's rookie list.

Shirley won a shock recall in round 12 of the next season after Simon Goodwin broke his wrist, and he did well enough to play every game for the remainder of the season. This included a noteworthy shutdown of future Brownlow Medallist Chris Judd in the Crows' Elimination Final victory over the West Coast Eagles. "It's funny how the game turns around pretty quickly," Shirley noted after the game. "A few months ago I wasn't really close to getting a game. In the second half of the season I've been lucky enough to stay in the side. It's week-by-week for me and I don't take it any further than that."

Shirley was reminded of the fickleness of form when he was dropped after the Crows' abysmal first-up loss to the Kangaroos in round 1, 2004. He was recalled in round 9, however, and played every game for the remainder of the season.

The 2005 AFL season proved a watershed year for Shirley as he became the club's primary tagger following the decision by Tyson Stenglein to return home to Perth at the end of 2004. Beginning with another personal victory over Judd in round 1 Shirley went from strength to strength, missing only one game in the team's unexpected rise to the Minor Premiership and subsequent exit at the Preliminary Final stage. His good form was acknowledged with the Coaches' Award at the club's Club Champion Award ceremony.

In 2006 Shirley began to develop his ballwinning skills, averaging 16 disposals per game and leading the club in Hard Ball Gets with 75 for the year. He also continued to be a reliable tagger for the club, finishing third in the club's tackle count with 85.

By 2007 Shirley had added another dimension to his game, registering eight 20-plus disposal games including a career high 30 touches against the Brisbane Lions in Round 21. He still remained one of the club's most prolific tacklers, achieving a personal best of 10 tackles in Adelaide's Elimination Final loss to Hawthorn Football Club. and placing third in the club's tackle count. At the conclusion of Round 5 Shirley won the AFL Army Award for the most courageous act of that week's matches, for his last-ditch spoil going back with the flight of the ball deep into the last quarter of the Crows' 1-point loss to Fremantle. At season's end Shirley's hard work was acknowledged with his second AFC Coach's Award.

From Shirley's recall to the side in 2004 to the last game of the 2008 AFL season, he missed only five games, four of which were through injury. However, in 2009, a new-look Adelaide outfit had no place for Shirley. Dropped for the first few games of the season, Shirley did return in round 11 but could not hold his place on a consistent basis and was in and out of the side, as quicker and more attacking players such as Michael Doughty and Nathan van Berlo were favoured in negating roles. Shirley was the highest profile player of five delisted by the club at the end of the season.

The Gold Coast Suns were considering selecting Shirley, but the 29-year-old midfielder decided to accept a lucrative contract from the Ainslie Football Club, rather than play with the Gold Coast.

Shirley returned to the Woodville-West Torrens Football Club for the 2012 SANFL season.
