= Rhan Hooper =

Australian rules footballer, born 1988

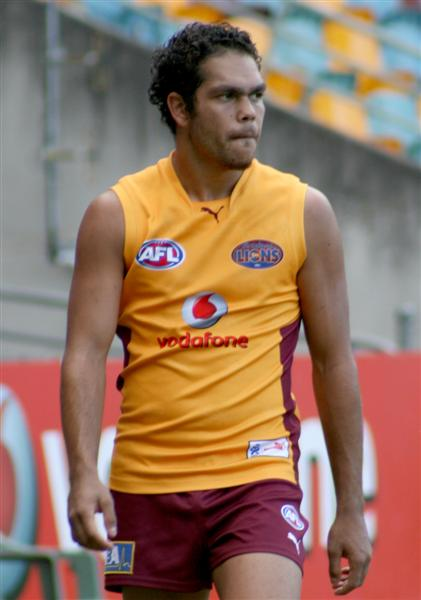
- Hooper at a training session in 2008

Personal information
- Full name: Rhan Hooper
- Born: 9 January 1988 (age 38); Charleville, Queensland
- Original team: Ipswich Eagles
- Draft: No. 41, 2005 national draft
- Debut: Round 2, 2006, Brisbane Lions vs. Essendon, at The Gabba
- Height: 177 cm (5 ft 10 in)
- Weight: 78 kg (172 lb)
- Position: Utility

Playing career^{1}
| Years | Club | Games (Goals) |
| 2006–2009 | Brisbane Lions | 48 (49) |
| 2010 | Hawthorn | 6 (7) |
| Total | | 54 (56) |
- ^{1} Playing statistics correct to the end of 2010.

Rhan Hooper (born 9 January 1988) is a former professional Australian rules football player who played with the Brisbane Lions and Hawthorn Football Club of the Australian Football League. An indigenous Australian with origins are from the Murri people his fast running and hard tackling were notable in the AFL.

Picked at number 41 in the 2005 National Draft by Brisbane, Hooper was recruited from Ipswich in Queensland and wore the number 33 Guernsey formerly worn by his idol, indigenous player Darryl White. Classified as a utility player, he had the ability to play many positions around the ground. Averaging over a goal a game he was most notable in the role of defensive forward and "goal sneak", sometimes also playing in the forward pocket or half forward. His pace, defensive and ballwinning abilities also saw him sometimes used on the ball or as a rebound defender.

== Early life ==
Hooper was born in Charleville to indigenous Australian (Murri) parents whose ancestry is from the Kooma tribe, before later moving to Cunnamulla.

Hooper played rugby league at junior level and lived in Ipswich as a teenager and attended the Bundamba State Secondary College.

He spent some time in Melbourne where he was first exposed to Aussie Rules in the under 9s by one of his sports coaches. He proved a talent and played some matches with the Dandenong Stingrays. Upon returning to Queensland and the Ipswich Eagles he first caught the eye of Brisbane Lions talent scouts while representing Queensland in the Under 18 championships in 2005. His dashes of blistering pace and ability to pick the ball up at full speed drew comparisons to the similar size and style of play of Melbourne Demons forward Aaron Davey, who had surprised the league a year earlier with the trailblazing defensive forward style. Hooper had also attracted the interest of the NRL, however chose to commit to the AFL.

== AFL career ==
Picked at number 41 in the 2005 National Draft from QAFL club Mount Gravatt Football Club, Hooper took very little time to break into senior AFL level, with an exciting performance in the 2006 NAB Cup.

He debuted in the Premiership season against Essendon showing plenty of pace, kicking a goal in his first game and racking up an impressive 7 tackles. His following performances were solid enough to guarantee his selection for several matches.

In late January 2007, it was revealed by the Lions that Hooper had lost his enthusiasm for the work involved in being a professional football player. His former Coach Leigh Matthews stated that the club had been working with Hooper to resolve any issues but had stopped paying him wages in the interim. Hooper returned to the senior side with a renewed commitment in June 2007, returning in round 10.

Among his highlights, season 2007 brought a 2007 AFL Army Award nomination in Round 10 for a match saving chase-down and tackle on Richmond's Matthew White, five crucial tackles against Melbourne in Round 15 and four goals against the Carlton Blues in Round 16.

However a lowlight was Hooper's suspension by the league for striking Hawthorn player Rick Ladson in Round 19 which was increased to three matches after Hooper contested a two match ban.

In December 2008, Hooper was suspended by the Lions for 58 days for several breaches to his playing contract including continually failing to attend pre-season training sessions.

In early 2009, he was fined $40,000 for multiple breaches of his playing contract including a second failure to attend training following his first suspension. The AFL Players Association backed the club's penalty. His last Brisbane Coach, Michael Voss delisted him at the end of the season despite being under contract.

In the 2009 National Draft, Hawthorn used pick 58 to snare Hooper. He would play six games for the Hawks and kick seven goals, showing sheer signs of brilliance, in particular in Round 22 against the Collingwood Magpies where he single-handedly kept Magpies game-breaker Dale Thomas to five disposals for the game. Hooper also kicked a very valuable goal in the final quarter as the Hawks won the game by three points.

Despite the resurgence of his career, on 6 October 2010, Hawthorn announced Hooper had quit the club and returned home to Queensland to start a family.

== Statistics ==
Legend
| G | Goals | K | Kicks | D | Disposals | T | Tackles |
| B | Behinds | H | Handballs | M | Marks |

| Season | Team | No. | Games | Totals | | | | | | | Averages (per game) | | | | | | | Votes |
| Season | Team | No. | Games | G | B | K | H | D | M | T | G | B | K | H | D | M | T | Votes |
|---|---|---|---|---|---|---|---|---|---|---|---|---|---|---|---|---|---|---|
| 2006 | Brisbane Lions | 33 | 11 | 9 | 10 | 49 | 30 | 79 | 12 | 38 | 0.8 | 0.9 | 4.5 | 2.7 | 7.2 | 1.1 | 3.5 | 0 |
| 2007 | Brisbane Lions | 33 | 8 | 8 | 10 | 70 | 38 | 108 | 30 | 27 | 1.0 | 1.3 | 8.8 | 4.8 | 13.5 | 3.8 | 3.4 | 2 |
| 2008 | Brisbane Lions | 33 | 20 | 19 | 15 | 120 | 80 | 200 | 55 | 89 | 1.0 | 0.8 | 6.0 | 4.0 | 10.0 | 2.8 | 4.5 | 1 |
| 2009 | Brisbane Lions | 33 | 9 | 13 | 6 | 50 | 25 | 75 | 21 | 26 | 1.4 | 0.7 | 5.6 | 2.8 | 8.3 | 2.3 | 2.9 | 0 |
| 2010 | Hawthorn | 20 | 6 | 7 | 5 | 33 | 17 | 50 | 15 | 25 | 1.2 | 0.8 | 5.5 | 2.8 | 8.3 | 2.5 | 4.2 | 0 |
| Career | | | 54 | 56 | 46 | 322 | 190 | 512 | 133 | 205 | 1.0 | 0.9 | 6.0 | 3.5 | 9.5 | 2.5 | 3.8 | 3 |

== Post AFL ==
=== Switch to Rugby League ===
In 2012, Hooper signed with rugby league club Ipswich Jets in the Queensland Rugby League competition.

=== Return to Australian Rules ===
After a brief stint in rugby league, Hooper switched back to Australian rules and the Springwood Australian Football Club south of Brisbane before returning to his old club Ipswich Eagles in a player coach capacity where he was selected to represent South Queensland in 2018. 2025 Premiership player for Coolaroo in the Darling Downs competition.
