= Black Sash =

South African white women's human rights organisation

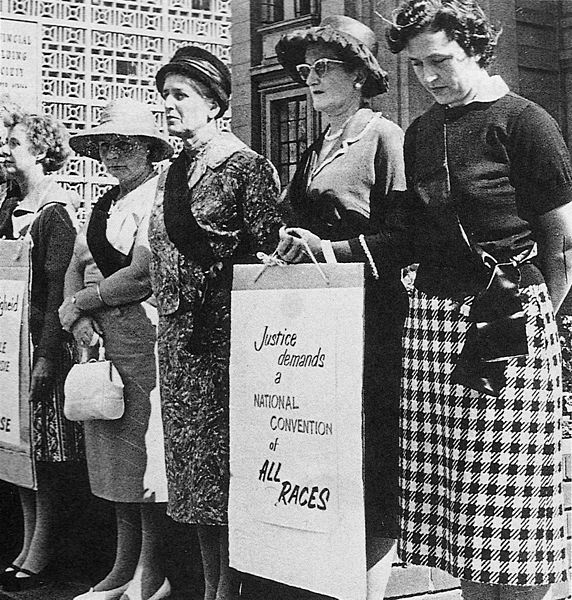
Black Sash demonstration between 1955 and 1960

The Black Sash is a South African civil and Indigenous rights organisation. It was founded in Johannesburg in 1955 as a nonviolent resistance organisation against apartheid for liberal white women.

== Origins ==
The Black Sash was founded on 19 May 1955 by six middle-class white women, Jean Sinclair, Ruth Foley, Elizabeth McLaren, Tertia Pybus, Jean Bosazza and Helen Newton-Thompson. The organisation was founded as the Women's Defence of the Constitution League but was eventually shortened by the press as the Black Sash due to the women's habit of wearing black sashes at their protest meetings. These black sashes symbolised the mourning for the South Africa Constitution. The founding members gathered for tea in Johannesburg before they decided to organise a movement against the Senate Act. They succeeded in holding a vigil of 2 000 women who marched from Joubert Park to the Johannesburg City Hall.

== Anti-apartheid activity ==
The Black Sash initially campaigned against the removal of Coloured or mixed race voters from the voters' roll in the Cape Province by the National Party government. As the apartheid system began to reach into every aspect of South African life, Black Sash members demonstrated against the Pass Laws and the introduction of other apartheid legislation. It would later open advice offices to provide information concerning their legal rights to non-white South Africans affected by that legislation. These advice offices were a critical role of the organisation's brave and principled role as a vital component of civil society.

Between 1955 and 1994, the Black Sash provided widespread and visible proof of white resistance towards the apartheid system. In fact, during the 1960s and most of the 1970s the Black Sash and National Union of South African Students represented the only consistent white opposition to the government outside Parliament. Its members worked as volunteer advocates to families affected by apartheid laws; held regular street demonstrations; spoke at political meetings; brought cases of injustice to the attention of their Members of Parliament, and kept vigils outside Parliament and government offices. Many members were vilified within their local white communities, and it was not unusual for women wearing the black sash to be physically attacked by supporters of apartheid.

Sheena Duncan joined the Black Sash in 1963, and led it for many years, becoming life president. In her time many booklets were written, and translated into indigenous languages, to inform people of their legal rights under apartheid.

In the 1980s the Black Sash formed a sub-committee called The Transvaal Rural Action Committee (TRAC) which was later part of the National Land Committee assisting the non-white communities that were subject to forced land removals. It would also create and fund the Rural Women's Movement (RWM), supporting rural non-white women rights in regards to inheritance and land ownership, in 1986. TRAC employed Lydia Kompe to coordinate the RWM in 1986, and Nomhlangano Beauty Mkhize, from Driefontein, became its first chairperson.

In 1983, the Black Sash called for the abolition of military conscription. The organisation was instrumental in establishing the End Conscription Campaign to campaign against compulsory military service by young white men.

== End of apartheid ==
The Black Sash's resistance movement came to an end in the early 1990s with the end of apartheid, the unbanning of the ANC and the release of Nelson Mandela from imprisonment. Its role was recognised by Nelson Mandela on his release and by subsequent political leaders. Prior to the 1994 multi-racial elections, Black Sash conducted voter education and produced a booklet called You and the Vote. The organisation was reformed in 1995 as a non-racial humanitarian organisation, working to 'make human rights real for all living in South Africa'.

In May 2015, the organisation celebrated its 60th anniversary as it shifted its focus towards education, training, advocacy and community monitoring. The celebration of the Black Sash history was also marked by the launching of two books, namely Standing on Street Corners: a History of the Natal Midlands Region of the Black Sash and a biography by Annemarie Hendrikz.

== National Presidents ==
- Ruth Foley 1955 - 1957
- Molley Petersen 1958 - 1959
- Eulalie Doreen Stott 1960 - 1961
- Jean Sinclair 1961 – 1975
- Sheena Duncan 1976 – 1978
- Joyce Harris 1979 - 1982
- Sheena Duncan 1983 – 1986
- Maria Macdiarmid "Mary" Burton 1987 – 1990
- Jennifer de Tolly 1991 – 1994

== See also ==
- Feminism in South Africa
- Sandra Botha
- Sheena Duncan
- Ruth Hayman
- Caesarina Kona Makhoere
- Mary Renault
- Noël Robb
- Helen Zille
