= Jack Hawkins (footballer) =

Australian rules footballer

Personal information
- Full name: Jack Hawkins
- Born: 21 May 1954 (age 72)
- Original team: Finley(NSW)/Melbourne Grammar(APS)
- Height: 188 cm (6 ft 2 in)
- Weight: 83 kg (183 lb)
- Position: Defender

Playing career^{1}
Years	Club	Games (Goals)
1973 – 1981	Geelong	182 (20)
- ^{1} Playing statistics correct to the end of 1981.

Jack Hawkins (born 21 May 1954) is a former Australian rules footballer who played 182 games for Geelong from 1973 to 1981. He is the father of former Geelong forward Tom Hawkins.

Hawkins made his Victorian Football League (VFL) debut against Collingwood in Round 3 1973 and immediately became a leading player for Geelong.

Hawkins had his most successful season in 1976, playing 24 games and polling 22 Brownlow Medal votes, finishing twelfth behind winner Graham Moss.

Hawkins was known as 'Jumping Jack' for his incredible vertical leap when jumping for a mark. He also won the State High Jump competition.

Hawkins' brothers Michael and Robb Hawkins also both played for Geelong, but each for just a single season. Jack's wife, Jennie, is the daughter of another former Geelong player, Fred Le Deux.
