= Matthew Egan =

Australian rules footballer, born 1983

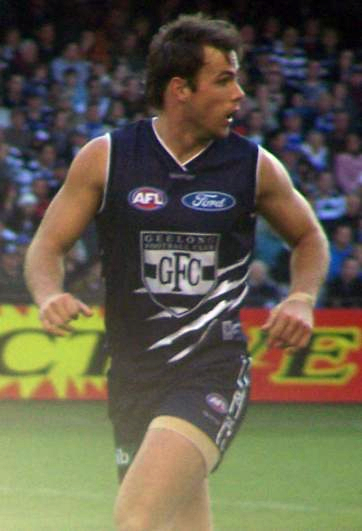
- Matt Egan playing for Geelong.

Personal information
- Full name: Matthew Egan
- Born: 10 July 1983 (age 43)
- Original team: Geelong (VFL)
- Draft: No. 62, 2004 National Draft
- Height: 198 cm (6 ft 6 in)
- Weight: 101 kg (223 lb)
- Position: Centre half-back

Playing career^{1}
Years	Club	Games (Goals)
2005–2007	Geelong	59 (1)

Coaching career^{3}
Years	Club	Games (W–L–D)
2015	Essendon	3 (1–2–0)
- ^{1} Playing statistics correct to the end of 2007.^{3} Coaching statistics correct as of 2015.

Career highlights
- All-Australian team 2007

Matthew Egan (born 10 July 1983) is a former Australian rules footballer who played for the Geelong Football Club in the Australian Football League (AFL). He served as interim senior coach at the Essendon Football Club after the resignation of James Hird for the final three rounds of the 2015 season. He served as head of development at the Melbourne Football Club from September 2016 until 2020.

== AFL playing career ==
Geelong

Egan took up football in his late teens after having been a promising junior tennis player, having once been ranked fifth for juniors in Victoria. As a sentiment to this he is known for his trademark "Forehand punch" as he swings it like a tennis Forehand. Geelong drafted him with their final pick in the 2004 National Draft, after he had played in the VFL with the reserves and was named Geelong's best first-year player for 2005.

He was a tall centre half-back, who often shut down some of the opposition's top forwards, including Nick Riewoldt, Barry Hall, Matthew Lloyd, Fraser Gehrig, Jonathan Brown, Matthew Pavlich and Quinten Lynch amongst others.

Egan had a spectacular third season in the AFL, playing 22 matches, with 257 disposals, achieving several honours such as All-Australian selection, and celebrated his 50th AFL game with a win over the Sydney Swans, even though he did only manage nine disposals.

Round 14 saw a 50-point win over Essendon, with 12 disposals, and receiving an Army Award nomination for a courageous goal-saving, diving smother. He was declared the round's winner with 44% of the public vote, but ultimately lost out in the selection of the final shortlist of the year's weekly winners.

Against the Brisbane Lions in Round 22, Egan fractured the navicular bone in his right foot during a marking contest with Jonathan Brown, requiring emergency surgery to insert screws into his foot. This injury saw Egan forced out of the finals, missing both the AFL and VFL's victorious premiership sides.

Egan capped off an excellent season with selection in the 2007 All-Australian Team as the centre half-back in a squad that contained nine Geelong players. He was also named Geelong's Best Clubman for 2007.

In November 2008, Geelong admitted it was unlikely that Egan would play AFL again, as a result of the foot injury he sustained in 2007.

On 26 August 2009, Geelong announced that they would delist Egan, but that they remained hopeful he would play again in the AFL and they also retired the number 19 for season 2010 in honour of Egan.

Egan played for Geelong from 2005 until 2007 for total of 59 games and one goal.

== AFL Coaching Career ==
Geelong

In 2009, Egan worked that year as an assistant coach at the Cats VFL team and continued to work for the club as an assistant in 2010.

Essendon

In October 2011, Egan joined Essendon as an assistant coach under senior coach James Hird. In the 2015 AFL season, Egan was appointed as caretaker senior coach of Essendon, following the resignation of senior coach James Hird and coached the club for the final three games of the 2015 season. Egan was able to coach the team to a series of better performances including a win against Collingwood. Egan said “I enjoyed the three games that I got. It probably showed me that I’ve still got a lot to work on!” Egan was not retained as senior coach of Essendon at the end of the 2015 AFL season. Egan was then replaced by John Worsfold as senior coach of Essendon. Egan however remained with Essendon as an assistant coach.

Egan departed the Essendon Football Club at the end of the 2016 AFL season.

Melbourne

Egan then served as an assistant coach in the role of head of development at the Melbourne Football Club under senior coach Simon Goodwin from September 2016 until 2020.

Geelong

Egan then returned to Geelong in October 2021 as assistant coach in the role of Head of Development under senior coach Chris Scott. Egan then departed Geelong at the end of the 2023 AFL season.

== Sports Administration career ==
Western Bulldogs

In January 2024, Egan joined Western Bulldogs as general manager of football operations.

== Statistics ==
Legend
G	Goals	K	Kicks	D	Disposals	T	Tackles
B	Behinds	H	Handballs	M	Marks

Season	Team	No.	Games	Totals							Averages (per game)						
Season	Team	No.	Games	G	B	K	H	D	M	T	G	B	K	H	D	M	T
2005	Geelong	19	15	0	1	67	65	132	49	8	0.0	0.1	4.5	4.3	8.8	3.3	0.5
2006	Geelong	19	22	1	0	102	130	232	82	31	0.0	0.0	4.6	5.9	10.5	3.7	1.4
2007	Geelong	19	22	0	0	115	142	257	80	29	0.0	0.0	5.2	6.5	11.7	3.6	1.3
2008	Geelong	19	0	—	—	—	—	—	—	—	—	—	—	—	—	—	—
2009	Geelong	19	0	—	—	—	—	—	—	—	—	—	—	—	—	—	—
Career			59	1	1	284	337	621	211	68	0.0	0.0	4.8	5.7	10.5	3.6	1.2
