= Rob (surname) =

Rob is a surname. Notable people with the surname include:

- Chris Rob, American musician
- Luboš Rob (born 1970), Czech ice hockey player
- Luboš Rob (born 1995), Czech ice hockey player, son of Luboš

== See also ==
- Robb
