= Fred Le Deux =

Australian rules footballer

Personal information
- Full name: Frederick David Le Deux
- Born: 4 December 1934 (age 91); Nagambie, Victoria
- Original team: Nagambie
- Height: 188 cm (6 ft 2 in)
- Weight: 89 kg (196 lb)
- Position: Follower / defender

Playing career^{1}
Years	Club	Games (Goals)
1956–1958	Geelong	18 (0)
- ^{1} Playing statistics correct to the end of 1958.

Frederick David Le Deux (born 4 December 1934) is a former Australian rules footballer who played with Geelong in the Victorian Football League (VFL). He is the grandfather of Tom Hawkins.

== Early life ==
Le Deux grew up in Nagambie and attended Assumption College, after which he went to Bendigo to study teaching.

== Football ==
While a student at Bendigo Teachers' Training College, Le Deux played for the Sandhurst Football Club. He then moved to Ocean Grove to take up a teaching position and in 1956 joined Geelong.

A follower and defender, Le Deux made 18 appearances for Geelong over three seasons, from 1956 to 1958 He was troubled by a back injury in 1958, which kept him out of the entire 1959 VFL season.

In 1960 he joined Victorian Football Association club Mordialloc, as he had transferred to a local technical school.

== Family ==
Le Deux's daughter Jennifer was married to former Geelong player Jack Hawkins. Jennifer died in 2015. Their son, Tom Hawkins, played for Geelong.
