= Michael Hawkins (footballer) =

Australian rules footballer

Personal information
- Full name: Michael Hawkins
- Born: 18 September 1951 (age 75)
- Original team: Finley/Melbourne Grammar
- Height: 196 cm (6 ft 5 in)
- Weight: 83.5 kg (184 lb)

Playing career^{1}
Years	Club	Games (Goals)
1973	Geelong	2 (0)
- ^{1} Playing statistics correct to the end of 1973.

Michael Hawkins (born 18 September 1951) is a former Australian rules footballer who played for the Geelong Football Club in the Victorian Football League (VFL).

Hawkins is the brother of Jack and Robb Hawkins and the uncle of current Geelong player Tom Hawkins. Originally from Finley, New South Wales, he played two games for Geelong in 1973.

Hawkins won the 1977 O'Dwyer Medal in the Murray Football League.
