= AFL Army Award =

Australian Football League award

From 2007 until 2009, the Australian Football League produced the AFL Army Award in partnership with the Australian Army, to recognise players who produced significant acts of bravery or selflessness to promote the cause of their team during a game.

Three nominees were selected by a panel and put up for a public vote after each of the 22 regular season rounds. Each of the weekly winners were then considered by the panel (AFL All-Australian Selection Committee) to produce a selection shortlist for the general public to vote on. The winner of the vote needed the endorsement of the selection panel.

== Winners ==
Year	Winner	Team	Description
2007	Alwyn Davey	Essendon	Made a diving smother, then recovered for two further defensive efforts.
2008	Brett Deledio	Richmond	Extremely gutsy attempt to mark with the flight.
2009	Tom Hawkins	Geelong	Brilliant smother and subsequent chase and tackle.
