= John Robb (1862–1913) =

Scottish civil engineer

John Robb was born in Alloa on 25 April 1862, the first son of Andrew Robb (1825–1900), the foreman and later Manager of Gaberston Mill, and his wife Mary Bennie Swanson, daughter of John Swanson, a Distillery Manager. He had three brothers and a sister, Janet, the mother of classical composer Edward Norman Hay (1889–1943).

== Training ==
John trained as an architect in Alloa, likely with John Melvin & Son, before moving to Newcastle upon Tyne in 1882 where he was assistant to Joseph J. Lish, an architect who specialized in ecclesiastical work and concrete construction. He was involved in the design and construction of the Clayton Road Wesleyan Church in Jesmond. He later returned to Scotland and worked as an architect for a spell, including designing industrial buildings in Glasgow.

== Work ==
He worked for a spell with the Assessor of Railways and Canals in Edinburgh. before joining Midlothian County Council as assistant county surveyor in around 1891. On the tragic accidental death of the county surveyor, Thomas Forbes, in 1896 Robb took over his role as Suburban road surveyor and the following year was appointed county surveyor from a field of 50 applicants, on a salary of £450 a year.

The Roads Office grew in importance with the rapid rise of the motor car and Robb led an office with four road surveyors for the county areas (Suburban, Calder, Gala Water and Lasswade). His younger brother David Haig Robb worked as a surveyor in his department and from 1905 another brother Andrew (1869-1926) joined his department as chief clerk or assistant county surveyor. Yet another brother, James, served as a road surveyor for Edinburgh Council.

Robb brought many new innovations in road management to Midlothian Council, which was seen as the foremost roads authority in Scotland, not least because it was the first to employ a county surveyor with all roads in the county controlled from a single office, ensuring equitable allocation of resources. In 1902 he was responsible for a road map of the county published by W&AK Johnston. Robb widened, reconstructed and maintained roads in the county and also repaired and rebuilt bridges. He also designed new bridges at Polton, Roslin, Whelpside, Braidwood and two at Heriot. Much of his work involved obtaining road metal from council-owned or leased quarries such as Kaimes, Blackford, Cortleferry and Barnton. In 1907 he treated the members of the County Road Surveyors Association of Scotland to a 'monster blast' that dislodged 8,000 tonnes of rock at Kaimes.

He was particularly influential in providing housing for roadmen in the county. In 1900 he had argued that providing decent homes for roadmen would cut down on travel-to-work times and would keep good men in the council's employ. The council agreed and from 1901 began building housing throughout the county area. These simple single and semi-detached dwellings were designed by Robb whose architectural background came in useful. They were normally built at road intersections or near council quarries. Several remain including a semi-detached dwelling in Silverburn that retains its "County Roadman" sign, with single examples at Old Craighall, Gourlaw and Kirknewton and a special two-storey design in the Arts & Crafts style at Spylaw Road in Colinton. All utilised harled brick walls with red engineering brick quoin detailing. This provision was followed thereafter by other Councils.

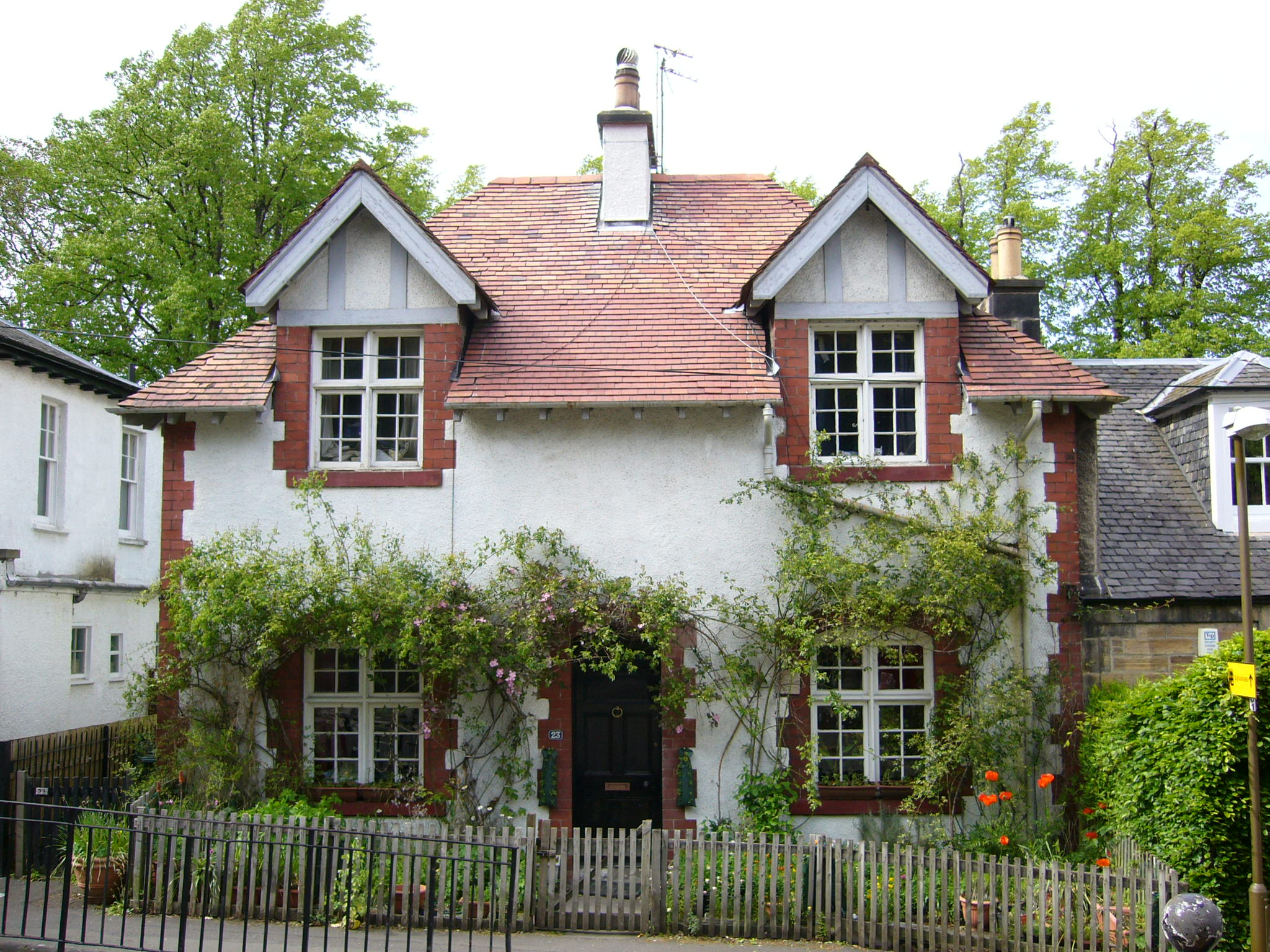
Former Midlothian roadmans cottage

His last years were dominated by a council proposal to erect a ferro-concrete bridge over the Water of Leith and Caledonian Railway at Colinton. Robb's design, had it been built, would have been the largest concrete road bridge in Scotland, and one of the largest in the UK. However, in this endeavour he was strenuously opposed by a group of influential Colinton residents led by Sir Robert Rowand Anderson, Scotland's premier architect, and eventually the bridge was only widened.

In his professional life he was a leading member of the East of Scotland Engineering Association, serving as an early Honorary Secretary and Vice President. He was also President of the County Road Surveyors Association of Scotland and served as a delegate in their 1904 trip to France. He returned five years later as a delegate to the first International Road Congress held in Paris in 1909. In 1900 he was elected a Member of the Royal Scottish Arboricultural Society.

In January 1912 he was appointed an Affiliate of the Institution of Civil Engineers and served on their Scottish Roads Committee. That year he had been personally complimented by the Road Board on his expenditure of their grants of £11,000.

In his spare time he served in the Volunteers becoming Sergeant-Instructor of Musketry for the Lothian and Berwickshire Imperial Yeomanry, after passing an exam at the School of Musketry in Hythe. He received the Imperial Yeomanry long service medal in February 1905, and was a fine rifle shot, making numerous appearances at shooting competitions and at the NRA competitions at Bisley.

== Death ==
He died on 15 January 1913 at Craiglockhart Hydropathic and is buried in Peebles. He left around £1000, his gold watch, seal and drawing equipment to his brother Andrew. Andrew's second son, Graeme Lambert Robb (1906–58) would also serve, early in his career, as a Road Surveyor for Midlothian whilst his brother George Clark Robb (1903–80) became an architect.
