= Robb Hawkins =

Australian rules footballer

Personal information
- Full name: Robb Hawkins
- Born: 10 October 1957 (age 69)
- Original team: South Adelaide
- Height: 197 cm (6 ft 6 in)
- Weight: 89 kg (196 lb)

Playing career^{1}
Years	Club	Games (Goals)
1984	Geelong	3 (0)
- ^{1} Playing statistics correct to the end of 1984.

Robb Hawkins (born 10 October 1957) is a former Australian rules footballer, playing with Geelong Football Club in the Victorian Football League (VFL) and South Adelaide Football Club in the South Australian National Football League.

Hawkins is the brother of Jack and Michael Hawkins and the uncle of current Geelong player Tom Hawkins. Robb Hawkins joined South Adelaide in 1979 from Geelong reserves and gave the Panthers fine service. A high-leaping ruckman hailing from a farm in Finley, New South Wales, Hawkins had to wait a couple of seasons to become a League regular. He broke through in 1981, winning State selection and the Knuckey Cup as best and fairest. In total he played 115 games at South Adelaide, including two club best and fairest awards but his time at Geelong was curtailed due to injury, only playing 3 games in 1984.
