= James Robb =

James Robb may refer to:

- James Robb (politician) (1859–1929), Canadian politician
- James Robb (RAF officer) (1895–1968), RAF commander
- James Robb (philosopher) (1918–1993), professor of philosophy at Marquette University
- Jim Robb (born 1933), Canadian watercolour painter
- J. Hampden Robb (1846–1911), New York politician
- James Robb (golfer) (1878–1949), Scottish amateur golfer
- James Robb (pathologist), American pathologist
