= 2007 AFL Mark of the Year =

The Australian Football League celebrates the best mark of the season through the annual Mark of the Year competition. In 2007, this is officially known as the Toyota AFL Mark of the Year. Sports Tonight (late edition) shows both the Goal of the Year and Mark of the Year Nominations for the previous round on Wednesday nights.

== Winners by Round ==
Legend

| = Round's Winning Mark |

| Round | Report | Nominees | Team | % of votes | Match | Ground | Note |
|---|---|---|---|---|---|---|---|
| 1 | Nominations | Nathan Eagleton | Western Bulldogs | 32% | Western Bulldogs vs Geelong | Telstra Dome | Flies early and high over pack on the wing |
| 1 | Nominations | Brett Ebert | Port Adelaide | 29% | Fremantle vs Port Adelaide | Subiaco Oval | Strong grab over a number of players deep in the forward line |
| 1 | Nominations | Ted Richards | Sydney | 39% | Sydney vs West Coast | Telstra Stadium | Courageous mark running back with the flight |
| 2 | Winner | Darren Milburn | Geelong | 26% | Geelong vs Carlton | Telstra Dome | Flew high over pack in defensive half |
| 2 | Winner | Beau Waters | West Coast | 43% | West Coast vs Collingwood | Subiaco Oval | Acrobatic leap before crashing to ground |
| 2 | Winner | Tim Boyle | Hawthorn | 31% | Hawthorn vs Melbourne | MCG | Jumped early to take grab in attack |
| 3 | Nominations Winner | Mark McVeigh | Essendon | 75% | Carlton vs Essendon | MCG | Leapt high above Bret Thornton for a spectacular mark. |
| 3 | Nominations Winner | Campbell Brown | Hawthorn | 10% | Kangaroos vs Hawthorn | Telstra Dome | Standing jump in the goal-square |
| 3 | Nominations Winner | Josh Fraser | Collingwood | 15% | Collingwood vs Richmond | MCG | Leapt over pack for a strong mark |
| 4 | Nominations Winner | Jason Blake | St Kilda | 8% | St Kilda vs Essendon | Telstra Dome | Strong contested mark over Essendon player |
| 4 | Nominations Winner | Patrick Ryder | Essendon | 75% | St Kilda vs Essendon | Telstra Dome | Big leap over opponents at half back |
| 4 | Nominations Winner | Ian Perrie | Adelaide | 17% | Adelaide vs Sydney | AAMI Stadium | Good leap and mark inside forward 50 |
| 5 | Nominations Winner | Jay Schulz | Richmond | 11% | Richmond vs West Coast | MCG | Courageous mark running back with the flight |
| 5 | Nominations Winner | Luke McGuane | Richmond | 59% | Richmond vs West Coast | MCG | Huge leap over Adam Hunter and Andrew Embley. |
| 5 | Nominations Winner | Aaron Edwards | Kangaroos | 30% | Geelong vs Kangaroos | Skilled Stadium | Big jump over Darren Milburn |
| 6 | Nominations Winner | Darren Jolly | Sydney | 10% | Kangaroos vs Sydney | Telstra Dome | Strong grab over Josh Gibson in the forward pocket |
| 6 | Nominations Winner | Leo Barry | Sydney | 36% | Kangaroos vs Sydney | Telstra Dome | Huge mark over a pack in the swans defence. |
| 6 | Nominations Winner | Beau McDonald | Brisbane | 54% | Brisbane vs Fremantle | The Gabba | Great leap and hang over Roger Hayden |
| 7 | Nominations Winner | Scott Lucas | Essendon | 33% | Kangaroos vs Essendon | Telstra Dome | Courageous leap and subsequent mark running across the goal. |
| 7 | Nominations Winner | Aaron Edwards | Kangaroos | 28% | Kangaroos vs Essendon | Telstra Dome | Strong pack mark. |
| 7 | Nominations Winner | Nick Riewoldt | St. Kilda | 39% | St. Kilda vs Sydney | Telstra Dome | Courageous mark running back with the flight of the ball. |
| 8 | Nominations Winner | Brent Stanton | Essendon | 47% | Essendon vs Brisbane | Telstra Dome | Big leap over Brisbane's Luke Power. |
| 8 | Nominations Winner | Angus Monfries | Essendon | 28% | Essendon vs Brisbane | Telstra Dome | Jumped over Michael Rischitelli in the forward pocket. |
| 8 | Nominations Winner | Aaron Edwards | Kangaroos | 25% | Kangaroos vs Carlton | Carrara Stadium | Spectacular leap over Bret Thornton. |
| 9 | Nominations Winner | Aaron Fiora | St. Kilda | 31% | Fremantle v St. Kilda | Subiaco Oval | Big leap over Fremantle's Peter Bell, before almost landing dangerously on his head. |
| 9 | Nominations Winner | Jonathan Brown | Brisbane | 35% | Brisbane v Collingwood | The Gabba | Courageous mark running back with the flight of the ball whilst running into oncoming traffic. |
| 9 | Nominations Winner | Mark McVeigh | Essendon | 34% | Richmond v Essendon | MCG | Spectacular leap over a pack. |
| 10 | Nominations | Leon Davis | Collingwood | 56% | Collingwood v Fremantle | MCG | One handed mark after a leap and hang over Fremantle's Michael Johnson. |
| 10 | Nominations | Aaron Fiora | St. Kilda | 34% | St. Kilda v Geelong | Telstra Dome | Leap over a pack that included each team's ruckman. |
| 10 | Nominations | Brad Green | Melbourne | 10% | Melbourne v Adelaide | MCG | One of those courage filled marks running with the flight of the ball into the unknown. |
| 11 | Nominations | Josh Fraser | Collingwood | 51% | Melbourne v Collingwood | MCG | One handed mark from a kick by Dane Swan in the goal square in a one-on-one contest. |
| 11 | Nominations | Brad Green | Melbourne | 18% | Melbourne v Collingwood | MCG | Pack mark deep in defence. |
| 11 | Nominations | Jason Laycock | Essendon | 31% | Essendon v West Coast Eagles | Telstra Dome | Contested mark after pushing off the back off his teammate Scott Lucas. |
| 12 | Nominations | Anthony Rocca | Collingwood | 49% | Sydney Swans v Collingwood | Telstra Stadium | Spectacular leap over Leo Barry. |
| 12 | Nominations | Chris Tarrant | Fremantle | 18% | Western Bulldogs v Fremantle | TIO Stadium | Leap in the goal square over Brian Harris. |
| 12 | Nominations | Colin Sylvia | Melbourne | 33% | Richmond v Melbourne | MCG | Big mark over Jake King. |
| 13 | Nominations | Russell Robertson | Melbourne | 31% | Essendon v Melbourne | Telstra Stadium | A big leap over Adam McPhee. |
| 13 | Nominations | Drew Petrie | Kangaroos | 32% | Kangaroos v Western Bulldogs | MCG | Screamer deep in his own forward line. |
| 13 | Nominations | Shane Edwards | Richmond | 37% | Richmond v Melbourne | MCG | Pack mark over his teammate Matthew Richardson. |
| 14 | | Xavier Ellis | Hawthorn | | Adelaide v Hawthorn | AAMI Stadium | Chest mark running with the flight of the ball. |
| 14 | | Ben McGlynn | Hawthorn | | Adelaide v Hawthorn | AAMI Stadium | One handed mark hanger. |
| 14 | | Mark Seaby | West Coast Eagles | | West Coast Eagles v Brisbane Lions | Subiaco Oval | Hit the pack hard and took mark deep in the forward 50. |

- *Denotes current Round

== See also ==
- Mark of the Year
- Goal of the Year
- 2007 AFL Goal of the Year
- 2007 AFL Season
