= Robbie (disambiguation) =

Robbie is a given name and surname.

Robbie or Robby may also refer to:

- "Robbie" (short story), a 1940 short story by Isaac Asimov
- Robbie (TV series), an American comedy television series
- Robbie (film), a series of railway safety films for UK schools
- Robby (film), a 1968 retelling of Robinson Crusoe
- Robbie, a 1975–1980 BBC Television series presented by Fyfe Robertson
- Robbie International Soccer Tournament, an annual sporting event in Birchmount Stadium, Toronto, Canada
