= Ralph Robb =

Scottish clergyman (1800–1850)

Ralph Robb (22 April 1800 – 5 July 1850) was a Scottish clergyman, the first Free Church of Scotland minister in the New World.

He was born in Manor Peebles, a farm within Logie Parish, Perthshire, the ninth of ten children of former maltman and farmer William Rob (1749–1818), son of farmer John Rob (1698–1764) and his second wife Agnes Wright (1709–1778), and Lilias Jaffray (1756–1820), daughter of Robert Jaffray and Lilias Hill of St. Ninian's parish. William and Lilias had been married in the Stirling Secession or Burgher Church and St. Ninian's on 15 February 1784. Ralph's grandfather John, a man of 'great piety and unblemished integrity', had left the Church of Scotland after a forced settlement at Logie, joining the Secession in Stirling under the pastoral ministrations of Revd. Ebenezer Erskine (1680–1754).

Ralph was named after Revd. Ralph Erskine (1685–1752) the brother of Ebenezer. From the age of 14 Robb was educated at Glasgow University, and thereafter pursued theological studies under Mr Taylor of Perth, Professor of Theology to the Original Burgher Synod. In 1823 he was licensed to preach the Gospel in the Presbytery of Perth, and in the following four years preached in various parts of Scotland and Ireland. He was ordained as pastor to the Original Secession Church in Strathkiness (St Andrews) on 24 July 1827 becoming the most popular minister in the county. On 8 September 1830 he married Margaret Carmichael (1808–1868), eldest daughter of Charles Carmichael of Dundee, and they had seven children, six of whom later settled in Canada.

Robb was instrumental in uniting the Associate Burgher Synod, of which he was Moderator in 1835, with the Church of Scotland. He joined the Church of Scotland in 1839 along with the remainder of the Burgher Synod, retaining his old congregation in Strathkiness. However, only four years later he made a stand for 'Christ's Gown and Covenant' signing the Protest and joining the Free Church of Scotland when it withdrew from the established church following the Disruption of 1843. That same year he left Glasgow for America, arriving in Nova Scotia in July 1844. He first served as Pastor to the St. John's Presbyterian Church in Halifax. In so doing he became the first Free Church Minister to cross over to the New World, where several of his brothers had already settled. In January 1844 he wrote to Rev. Dr Welsh, first Chair of the General Assembly of the Free Church of Scotland, informing him of the flourishing Sabbath school, efficient Kirk Session and collections received to erect a church school. He later wrote requesting Gaelic speaking ministers to attend to the many Highland congregations in Nova Scotia. In 1845 Robb undertook a tour of southern Nova Scotia meeting Scottish settlers. From May 1847 he served the Free Colonial Church/Knox Presbyterian Church, in Hamilton, Ontario, after their Minister Revd A Gale had left for Toronto Academy. Hamilton was a welcome location for him as his elder brother Andrew Robb (1798–1870) had settled there and was a merchant in King Street. Andrew had emigrated from Alloa and lived at Mountain Park, Ancaster. Another brother, James, became a successful Rice Miller in Charleston, SC, and his son built the William Robb House which still survives. Another brother, Alexander (d.1858), became a very successful merchant in New Orleans. Only the eldest brother John had remained in Scotland farming in Logie and Stirlingshire. Whilst at Hamilton Robb introduced several bible classes and lectures, including some specifically for women. In 1850 he caught a severe cold and failed to attend to it properly, leading to Erysipelas. He died on 5 July 1850, his funeral service being preached by Mr Burns of Toronto.

His obituary in the Free Church Magazine of 1851 includes the following;

His labours, first at Halifax and latterly at Hamilton, are identified with the history of the Colonial Free Church, and many will bless the memory of this good man, called away in the midst of his days and usefulness.

Of his children, his third son James Robb KC (1837–1917) became Judge for Norfolk County, his fourth son George Carmichael Robb (1839–1918) was an engineer in Dundee and Toronto. George and his wife Jane McNab had several children, including a son who became a Presbyterian minister, and two daughters who married Presbyterian ministers. His youngest daughter Agnes married Alexander Bruce KC, partner in Bruce, Bruce & Counsel, a legal firm in Hamilton, and their son Ralph Robb Bruce (1863–1938) later became a partner.
