= Jimmy Robb =

Scottish footballer (born 1935)

Personal information
- Full name: James Fraser Robb
- Date of birth: 30 March 1935 (age 91)
- Place of birth: Camlachie, Scotland
- Positions: Left half; inside right

Senior career*
Years	Team	Apps	(Gls)
–1954	Strathclyde		
1954–1958	Queen's Park	97	(13)
1958–1963	Third Lanark	67	(1)
1963–1964	Charlton Athletic	0	(0)
1964–1966	Stirling Albion	47	(3)
1966	Stenhousemuir	13	(1)
- * Club domestic league appearances and goals

James Fraser Robb (born 30 March 1935) is a Scottish retired footballer who played as a wing half and inside forward in the Scottish League for Queen's Park, Third Lanark, Stirling Albion and Stenhousemuir.

== Honours ==
Queen's Park

- Scottish League Second Division: 1955–56

Stirling Albion

- Scottish League Second Division: 1964–65
