= Robert the Robot =

AI-powered financial advisory robot

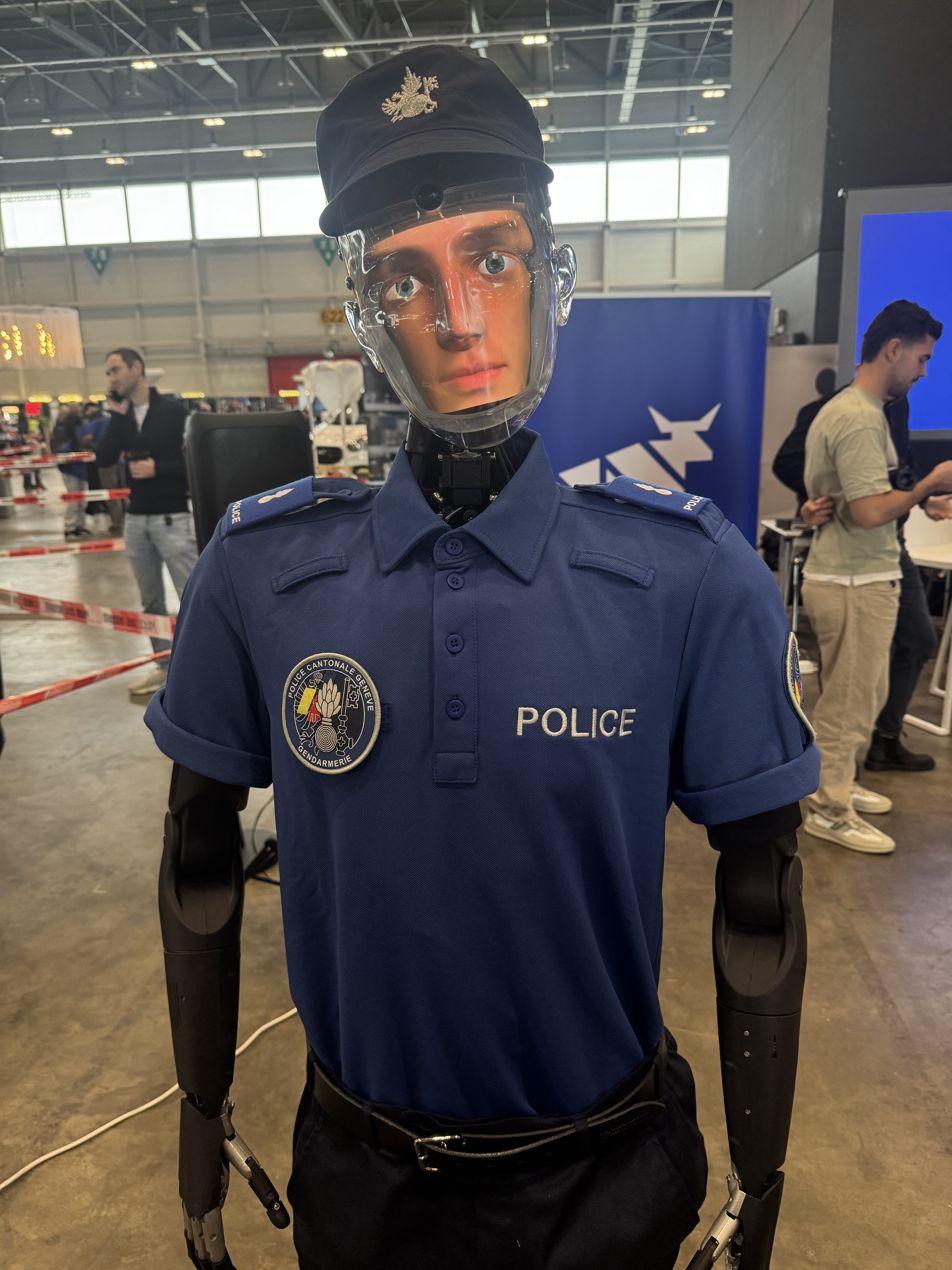
Robert the Robot at Police Day 2025 at Palexpo, Switzerland

Robert the Robot is a humanoid, AI‑powered financial advisory robot developed by Swiss fintech company RB Labs. Launched in 2025, Robert is designed to provide investment advice, financial education and wealth‑management guidance via advanced machine‑learning algorithms, blockchain‑based analysis and a human‑like conversational interface.

== Development ==
Robert was developed by RB Labs, a Geneva-based AI–fintech company co‑founded by Metodi Dimitrov, Robin Krambroeckers and Lin Dayen‑Hsu. The company claims Robert is the first AI‑powered financial advisory system certified for Swiss banking operations, reflecting its ambition to merge institutional-grade finance with advanced robotics and AI.

Robert is described as a "finance robot", combining algorithmic financial expertise with a humanoid interface intended for naturalistic human interaction. According to RB Labs, Robert leverages time‑series financial data, transformer and LSTM-based AI frameworks and blockchain‑enabled analysis to generate market insights. The robot is capable of delivering financial advice, investment commentary and educational guidance.

== Public appearances ==
Robert was publicly presented at the 2025 AI for Good Global Summit, where it featured among international technology demonstrations related to artificial intelligence and robotics. In the same year, Robert appeared at public events in the United States and the Middle East, where it interacted with attendees and demonstrated conversational capabilities in finance-themed presentations.

In Dubai, Robert was used in real-estate promotional and customer-engagement activities, where it interacted with visitors, answered questions and presented property-related information. In Switzerland, Robert was presented at Geneva's Police Day as an interactive, police-themed public-engagement robot designed to communicate public-safety information to visitors rather than to perform operational law-enforcement functions.

== Reception and impact ==
Robert has received media attention as an example of the use of humanoid robots in financial-technology demonstrations, public engagement and promotional contexts. Coverage has focused on its appearance, conversational interface and visibility at public events. Several media outlets have noted that videos of Robert's public interactions circulated widely on social-media platforms, with reported view counts reaching tens of millions.
