= Noël Robb =

South African activist

Ruth Noël Robb (born Barrow on 25 December 1913 - January 2009) was a South African activist and member of the Black Sash.

== Biography ==
Robb was born in Plymouth on 25 December 1913. Robb most often went by her middle name, Noël. She graduated from Bedford College in 1935 or 1936 and after college, got a job working in Cape Town at St. Cyprians School. She worked at St. Cyprians School for four years. She married Francis Charles Robb in December 1939 and he wanted her to stay at home and raise children, which she did. The couple had five children and Robb continued to do philanthropic work.

Robb graduated from the University of Cape Town (UCT) in 1973 with a Bachelor of Arts. She later earned an honorary masters degree in social science from UCT in 1994.

Robb died in Cape Town in January 2009.

== Activism ==
Robb was one of the original founding members of Black Sash, starting in 1955 when it was still called The Women's Defence of the Constitution League. She didn't want black South Africans to lose the right to vote, so she was motivated to stay involved. She remained a member for more than 40 years.

In 1956, Robb led a mass march to Cape Town, protesting changes to the Constitution. Robb ran the Black Sash Advice Office in Cape Town which was founded in 1958. This office helped black women deal with legal issues created by apartheid, as well as other types of problems they may have faced. After the 1960 Sharpeville massacre, Robb and other women brought supplies to people in the area and also helped people visit loved ones in prison. After the creation of Khayelitsha, Robb would visit residents of the segregated area and was known as "Mama Robb, Black Sash."

In March 1989, she was elected as lifetime Vice President of Black Sash. In 2006, she published a memoir, The Sash and I: A Personal Memoir and a Tribute to the Black Sash.
