= Douglas Robb =

Douglas Robb may refer to:

- Douglas J. Robb, physician in the U.S. Air Force
- Sir Douglas Robb (surgeon) (1899–1974), New Zealand heart surgeon
- Douglas Robb (schoolmaster) (born 1970), headmaster of Gresham's School, England
- Doug Robb, lead vocalist and founding member of Hoobastank, an American rock band active since 1994
