= George Robb =

George Robb may refer to:

- George Robb (footballer) (1926–2011), English footballer
- George Robb (rugby union) (1858–1927), Scottish rugby union player
- George S. Robb (1887–1972), United States Army officer and Medal of Honor recipient
- George Douglas Robb (surgeon) (1899–1974), New Zealand surgeon
