= Rob =

Rob or ROB may refer to:

== Places ==
- Rob, Velike Lašče, a settlement in Slovenia
- Republic of Belarus

== People ==
- Rob (given name), including a list of people and fictional characters with the name
- Rob (surname)
- Rob., taxonomic author abbreviation for William Robinson (gardener) (1838–1935), Irish practical gardener and journalist

== Arts and entertainment ==
- Rob (TV series), an American comedy show
- Rob Riley (comic strip), a British comic strip named after its titular character
- Rob the Robot (TV series), a TV series named after its titular character
- Rob, a character from the Cartoon Network series The Amazing World of Gumball
- ROB 64, a character in the Star Fox video game series
- Castlevania: Rondo of Blood, a 1993 video game nicknamed Castlevania: ROB
- Rob (robot name)
- R.O.B., an accessory for the Nintendo Entertainment System

== Science and technology ==
- Re-order buffer (ROB), used for out-of-order execution in microprocessors
- Robertsonian translocation (ROB), a form of chromosomal rearrangement

== Other uses ==
- Rob (dog) (1939–1952), a dog awarded the Dickin Medal
- Rob, the verb for robbery
- ISM Report On Business (informally, "The R.O.B."), an economic report issued by the Institute for Supply Management
- Report on Business, or "ROB", a section of the Globe and Mail newspaper
- Roberts International Airport (IATA code ROB), in Monrovia, Liberia
- Taeʼ language (ISO 639-3 code rob)

== See also ==
- Rob Roy (disambiguation)
- Robb (disambiguation)
- Robotics (disambiguation)
