= Thomas Robb =

Thomas Robb is the name of:

- Thomas Robb (Ku Klux Klan) (born 1946), white supremacist and Ku Klux Klan leader
- Tommy Robb (footballer) (born 1899), Scottish footballer
- Tommy Robb (motorcyclist) (1934–2024), British motorcyclist
- Tom Robb (1948–2006), American musician

== See also ==
- Robb Thomas (born 1966), American football player
