= Tom Hawkins (footballer) =

Australian rules footballer (born 1989)

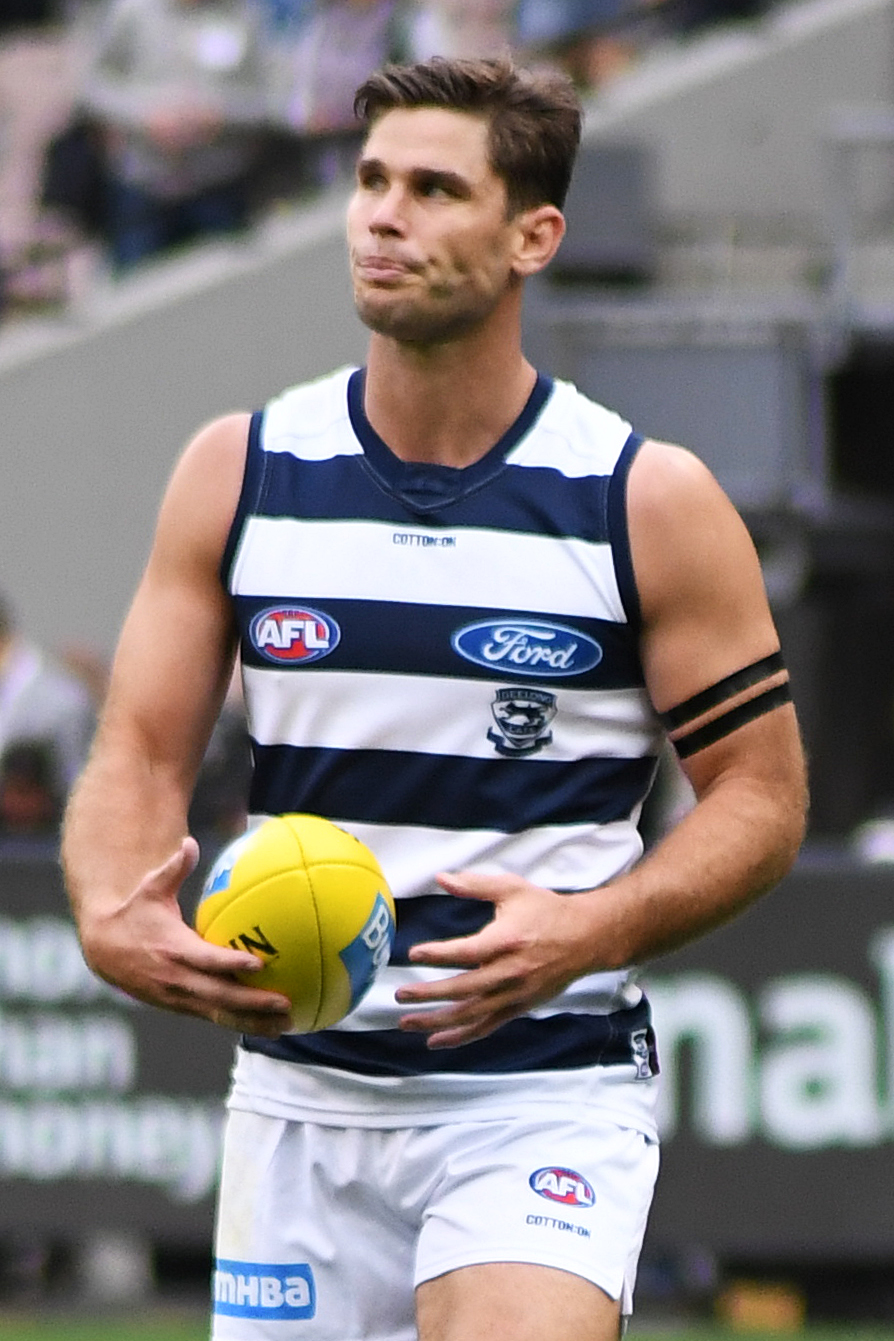
- Hawkins playing for Geelong in April 2019

Personal information
- Full name: Thomas Jack Hawkins
- Nicknames: Tomahawk, Hawk
- Born: 21 July 1988 (age 38); Finley, New South Wales
- Original team: Sandringham Dragons (TAC Cup)/ Melbourne Grammar (APS)/Finley Football Club
- Draft: No. 41 (F/S), 2006 national draft
- Height: 197 cm (6 ft 6 in)
- Weight: 105 kg (231 lb)
- Position: Key Forward

Club information
- Current club: Geelong
- Number: 26

Playing career
Years	Club	Games (Goals)
2007–2024	Geelong	359 (796)

Representative team honours
Years	Team	Games (Goals)
2020	All Stars	1 (0)

Career highlights
- 3× AFL premiership player: 2009, 2011, 2022; Coleman Medal: 2020; Carji Greeves Medal: 2012; 5× All-Australian team: 2012, 2019, 2020, 2021, 2022 (c); 11x Geelong leading goalkicker: 2012–2022; 1 x Carey-Bunton Medalist: 2020; Tom Wills Medal: 2023; 2009 NAB Cup Premiership Player; VFL premiership player: 2007; Larke Medal 2006; AFL Army Award: 2009; 2007 AFL Rising Star: nominee

Thomas Jack Hawkins (born 21 July 1988) is a former Australian rules footballer who played for the Geelong Football Club in the Australian Football League (AFL). At 198 cm (6 ft 6 in) tall and weighing 110 kg (240 lb), Hawkins played primarily as a key forward and is one of the most prolific scorers in the history of the game, ranked 13th-highest in all-time league goalkicking.

Hawkins was born and raised in country New South Wales before moving to Victoria to attend Melbourne Grammar School, where his football abilities earned him a spot in the first XVIII in year ten. He played top-level football with the Sandringham Dragons in the TAC Cup and Vic Metro in the AFL Under-18 Championships. His accolades as a junior include national and state representation, the Larke Medal as the AFL Under-18 Championships most valuable player, and All-Australian selection. As the eldest son of former Geelong champion Jack Hawkins, Hawkins was drafted by Geelong under the father–son draft rule with the forty-first selection in the 2006 national draft.

He made his AFL debut in 2007, which saw former Carlton coach Denis Pagan compare him to the highest goal scorer in the history of the league and former full-forward, Tony Lockett, after his debut game. His debut season saw him earn an AFL Rising Star nomination and he was part of Geelong's Victorian Football League (VFL) premiership side. He has since become a three-time AFL premiership player, a Coleman Medalist, an All-Australian full-forward, a Carji Greeves Medallist as the club best and fairest player, an eleven-time leading goalkicker for Geelong, and a recipient of the former AFL Army Award—awarded to a player who produces significant acts of bravery or selflessness during a season.

== Early life ==
Hawkins was born in Finley, New South Wales to Jack, and Jennie Hawkins. He grew up in the New South Wales region of Finley as the second child among four children. He attended St Joseph’s Primary School in Finley and eventually attending Finley High School while he lived in Finley he played for the Finley Football Club before making the move south of the border to begin boarding at Melbourne Grammar School, a long time tradition in his family. Hawkins' footballing ability was recognised early on when he was selected to play first XVIII football for the school while still in year ten, when many of his teammates were completing their final year of schooling at year twelve. Hawkins kicked four goals on debut for the school and his performances up forward soon received attention from AFL recruiting teams. By the time he had reached his final school year he was rewarded with joint captaincy of the football team alongside Hawthorn draftee Xavier Ellis. He was also selected in the Associated Public Schools (APS) team to play the Associated Grammar School selected football team in the traditional annual clash of schools, where he won best on ground honours for his performance.

Having gained permission to join local under-18 club in 2006, the Sandringham Dragons for numerous games during the season, Hawkins impressed in his limited appearances within the elite TAC Cup competition, highlighted by a twenty-two disposal, nine mark, and five goal effort in just his third game. In the same year, he was awarded an AIS/AFL academy scholarship as part of the ninth intake.

In the mid-year of 2006, Hawkins was selected to play in the 2006 AFL Under-18 Championships, lining up at full forward for Vic Metro. A best on ground performance which yielded twelve marks and six goals in the opening match against South Australia began a wave of unprecedented hype and attention, with Hawkins drawing comparisons to former Brisbane Lions forward, Jonathan Brown and leading Vic Metro coach David Dickson to declare the young forward as "the best footballer I've seen...since Chris Judd". Hawkins was awarded the Larke Medal as the most valuable player within division one and named as the tournament's All-Australian full-forward, just falling short of the all-time contested marking record held by Justin Koschitzke.

== AFL career ==
=== 2007–2011: early career ===
Hawkins was officially selected by Geelong in the 2006 national draft under the father–son rule. While many pundits lauded him as the best key position prospect within the draft, and felt Hawkins' junior performances warranted possible selection with the top overall pick, the father–son rules at the time only required Geelong to use a middle-tier third round pick to draft him. The subsequent controversy over what was widely acknowledged as a bargain gain for the Cats led to the AFL amending the father–son ruling for future use. With a reputation as one of the finest young tall forwards in the land, Hawkins was immediately billed as the successor to the legendary Gary Ablett, whose retirement eleven years earlier had left a gaping hole in Geelong's forward line. A stress reaction injury to his right leg, however, halted Hawkins' pre-season, forcing his much-awaited debut in Geelong colours to take place in the Victorian Football League (VFL) side.

Hawkins made his highly anticipated debut for the Geelong seniors in round two of the 2007 season against Carlton. Opposed to Carlton captain Lance Whitnall, Hawkins impressed with three goals and several strong marks in Geelong's 78-point victory, prompting then-Carlton coach Denis Pagan to label him the next Tony Lockett. Other revered media figures, such as Gerard Healy and David Parkin, were moved enough to describe the debut as the best first-up performance in recent memory. Uncommonly for AFL debutants, he followed up with an even more impressive performance in his second game, kicking four first-half goals to help set up a victory against Melbourne at the Melbourne Cricket Ground (MCG), earning the AFL Rising Star nomination for round three in the process. Question marks, however, were raised over his fitness and ability to run out entire games, and after nine games in his debut season, which saw him kick twelve goals, Hawkins saw out the rest of the year with the clubs' VFL side. There, Hawkins helped Geelong reach the VFL Grand Final for the second successive year, booting three goals as the Cats defeated the Coburg Tigers to claim their first VFL premiership since 2002.

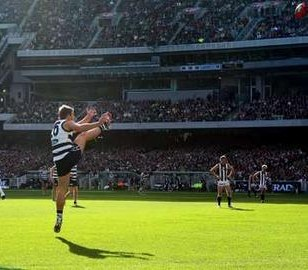
Hawkins kicks for goal

Despite inconsistencies in Hawkins’ form, he played twenty-four matches for the 2009 season, including the grand final, where he played alongside other father–son selections, Gary Ablett, Matthew Scarlett and Mark Blake. He scored two goals in the game to help Geelong defeat St Kilda by twelve points, winning the 2009 AFL premiership. One of his goals was notably controversial, as it was later ruled it had hit the goal post, which should have been registered as a behind; this was one of the reasons behind the introduction of the goal review system implemented by the AFL during the 2012 season.

A mid-year footy injury saw Hawkins miss seven weeks of football in 2010, and he finished the season with eighteen matches and twenty-one goals. He did, however, play in Geelong's final series; a narrow loss to St Kilda in the qualifying final hampered Geelong's chances of retaining the premiership and a 41-point loss to eventual premiers, Collingwood, in the preliminary final ended Geelong and Hawkins' season.

Hawkins faced scrutiny during the 2011 season for his inconsistent form, which saw him dropped from the senior side in the middle of the season. He was highly praised during Geelong's finals series in which Herald Sun journalist Scott Gullan labelled the qualifying win against Hawthorn the best match of Hawkins' career at the time. He bettered that performance two weeks later in the 2011 AFL Grand Final, where he finished the day with nineteen disposals, nine marks and three goals to win his second premiership medallion. An injury to fellow forward James Podsiadly in the second quarter meant Hawkins was the main target in the forward line where he kicked three goals in the third quarter and he was labelled as the unlikely hero by Fox Sports Australia journalist Mike Hedge. His performance saw him awarded five votes for the Norm Smith Medal, coming third behind Jimmy Bartel with thirteen votes and Joel Selwood with nine votes. It was later revealed in a book—Greatness, Inside Geelong's Path to Premiership History—that he was nearly dropped for the final series for retiring forward Cameron Mooney.

=== 2012–2024: Geelong leading goalkicker ===
In 2012, Hawkins had a breakout year, kicking sixty-two goals to finish equal second in the Coleman Medal. In the Round 19 match against Hawthorn, he kicked six goals, including a goal after the siren, to deliver Geelong a two-point victory. The win was Geelong's ninth consecutive victory over the Hawks since losing to them in the 2008 AFL Grand Final. After every season he participated in finished in at least making the preliminary final, Geelong exited the final series in the first week after the 16-point loss to Fremantle at the MCG. His emergence was rewarded with selection in the 2012 All-Australian team, the Carji Greeves Medal as the club best and fairest player, and he was Geelong's leading goalkicker.

After Hawkins' emergence in 2012, a bulging disc in his back impacted his abilities during the 2013 season; struggling with form throughout the season, he received bronx cheers from Geelong supporters in the round 20 match against Port Adelaide at Simonds Stadium after he managed only six disposals and a goal. The persistent back injury forced him to miss the start of the finals series by missing the qualifying final match against Fremantle at Simonds Stadium. He played in the next two finals matches, including the 5-point loss against Hawthorn in the preliminary final which ended Geelong's season. Despite the back injury, he managed to play 22 matches for the season kicking 49 goals, and he was Geelong's leading goalkicker for the second consecutive year.

Described as returning to being a "genuine match winner" during the 2014 season by teammate Tom Lonergan, Hawkins overcame his back injury to replicate his form from the 2012 season. He kicked 68 goals for the season including a then-career-high seven goals against the Brisbane Lions in round 23. He had strong performances against Hawthorn, kicking five goals and North Melbourne, kicking four goals in rounds five and ten respectively; his performance against Hawthorn earned him the maximum three Brownlow votes making him the best player on the ground adjudged by the field umpires. During the qualifying final match against Hawthorn, he was scrutinised for a jumper punch against Ben Stratton, which was pondered whether Hawkins would face a suspension; he was ultimately cleared of the incident, which allowed him to play in the semi-final loss against North Melbourne. His season was rewarded with selection in the initial forty man All-Australian squad, although he missed out on the final team. In addition, he finished second in the best and fairest count behind Joel Selwood, he finished second in the Coleman Medal, and he was Geelong's leading goalkicker for the third consecutive season.

Personal tragedy hit Hawkins early in the 2015 season when his mother, Jennie, died in April. He subsequently missed the Round 3 match against Gold Coast before returning the next week against North Melbourne in which he paid tribute to his mother after his only goal in the match; in addition, the game saw him reach his 150-game milestone. He missed only one match for the remainder of the season, the Round 7 match against Sydney. Since joining Geelong, it was the first season the club missed the finals series, and he ultimately played nineteen games for the season and kicked forty-six goals, making him Geelong's leading goalkicker for the fourth consecutive season. Entering the season, he remained unsigned, meaning he would become a free agent if he remained out of contract at the end of the season. He ultimately ignored the lure of free agency, and he signed a five-year contract in July, tying him to the club until the end of the 2020 season.

The first half of the 2016 season saw Hawkins play inconsistently due to his form wavering, with Geelong coach Chris Scott noting Hawkins' "impact isn't what he'd like it to be and hasn't been for some time"; despite his inconsistency, Scott reassured fans that he believed Hawkins' best was still ahead of him. It was revealed at the end of the season, that he had played with a small tear in his meniscus, which resulted in post-season surgery. He missed one match for the season after he was suspended for striking Greater Western Sydney captain, Phil Davis, in Round 11. The decision by the match review panel was criticised by the Herald Sun chief of football writer, Mark Robinson, where he labelled the decision "a joke", and the backlash forced match review panel member Nathan Burke to publicly defend the decision. Geelong returned to the final series in 2016, making it to the preliminary final and losing to Sydney by thirty-seven points at the MCG. He finished with twenty-three matches for the season, kicking fifty-five goals, and he was Geelong's leading goalkicker for the fifth consecutive season.

The 2017 season marked Hawkins' evolution from a typical tall forward into a more mobile, roaming spearhead, being the club's leading goalkicker for a sixth straight season. He again suffered from discipline issues, notably jumper punching, as he received two separate suspensions for striking on Adelaide's Matt Crouch and Sydney's Dane Rampe. His strike on Crouch was questioned as "insignificant" by coach Chris Scott, although his hit on Rampe was viewed as far more deliberate. Through this, Hawkins still managed to gain a spot on the All-Australian team that season.

Hawkins continued his strong form into the 2018 season, totalling 60 goals on the season and finishing third in the Coleman Medal race, leading Geelong's goalkicking for a seventh straight season. While he was again suspended, this time for making contact with umpire Dean Margetts, Hawkins was recognised as one of the most impactful forwards in the league, totalling seven goals in a game twice, including his famous performance against Melbourne in Round 18.

The 2019 season was a continuation of Hawkins' solid form, kicking 56 goals and leading the club in goals kicked for the eighth consecutive season. He was named as the All-Australian full forward in recognition of his performance, however his prior disciplinary problems returned somewhat, as he was suspended for one game for striking West Coast defender Will Schofield to the head in an off-ball incident during the team's semi-final victory, causing him to miss the loss to eventual premiers Richmond in the preliminary final.

While the 2020 season was heavily impacted by the COVID-19 pandemic, Hawkins won the Coleman Medal with a total of forty-two goals during the home and away season. Despite not being his largest tally in a season, his dominance as a forward throughout the seventeen-game season was established with a "near-unassailable lead" of eleven goals from his closest competitors in Charlie Dixon and Josh Kennedy. Geelong qualified for the finals series and surpassed past finals disappointments by reaching for the grand final. A half-time lead was unable to hold off a fast-finishing Richmond side, with Geelong falling short by thirty-one points.

Hawkins' strong form continued into the 2021 season, once again being Geelong's leading goalkicker with 62 goals. Geelong reached the preliminary final, this time falling at the hands of eventual premier Melbourne, who dominated with an 83-point win.

Geelong's remarkably strong form in the 2022 season included a sixteen game winning streak and an outstanding performance on grand final day, with an 81-point victory over Sydney. Marking his third premiership, Hawkins led Geelong's goalkicking an eleventh consecutive year, finishing the season with a total of sixty-seven goals, including the first two goals of the grand final. Both goals were won in forward 50 ruck contests against Sydney ruckman Tom Hickey, sparking Geelong's dominance throughout the match.

The 2023 season was a disappointment for Geelong, with the club failing to qualify for the finals series for the first time since 2015. Although Hawkins kicked a career-high eight goals against Essendon in Round 7—and a total of 49 goals for the year—his reign as Geelong leading goalkicker concluded when teammate Jeremy Cameron finished the year with 53 goals.

Hawkins entered the 2024 season requiring only nineteen goals to bring his career tally to eight hundred goals. Despite kicking nine goals in his first three matches, his form during the season was marred by poor form, including a stretch of four games where Hawkins was unable to register a goal. His season was further disrupted when he injured his foot during Geelong's 63-point loss to Carlton in Round 15, making this his last-ever AFL game.

On 6 August 2024, Hawkins announced that he would retire at the conclusion of the 2024 AFL season.

Hawkins made a final appearance for Geelong's VFL team in their semi-final against Southport in September. He kicked a goal during the first quarter in his first match in the VFL competition since 2011.

== Statistics ==
Legend
G	Goals	K	Kicks	D	Disposals	T	Tackles
B	Behinds	H	Handballs	M	Marks

Season	Team	No.	Games	Totals							Averages (per game)							Votes
Season	Team	No.	Games	G	B	K	H	D	M	T	G	B	K	H	D	M	T	Votes
2007	Geelong	26	9	12	10	52	25	77	33	9	1.3	1.1	5.8	2.8	8.6	3.7	1.0	0
2008	Geelong	26	10	13	5	71	48	119	51	15	1.3	0.5	7.1	4.8	11.9	5.1	1.5	2
2009^{#}	Geelong	26	24	34	17	148	130	278	131	56	1.4	0.7	6.2	5.4	11.6	5.5	2.3	0
2010	Geelong	26	18	21	13	95	131	226	102	47	1.2	0.7	5.3	7.3	12.6	5.7	2.6	0
2011^{#}	Geelong	26	18	27	17	125	98	223	88	38	1.5	0.9	6.9	5.4	12.4	4.9	2.1	0
2012	Geelong	26	22	62	38	198	80	278	144	25	2.8	1.7	9.0	3.6	12.6	6.5	1.1	10
2013	Geelong	26	22	49	20	141	74	215	93	22	2.2	0.9	6.4	3.4	9.8	4.2	1.0	0
2014	Geelong	26	24	68	40	222	75	297	161	32	2.8	1.7	9.3	3.1	12.4	6.7	1.3	7
2015	Geelong	26	19	46	20	145	51	196	93	43	2.4	1.1	7.6	2.7	10.3	4.9	2.3	3
2016	Geelong	26	23	55	31	198	90	288	126	61	2.4	1.3	8.6	3.9	12.5	5.5	2.7	2
2017	Geelong	26	22	51	26	199	100	299	116	61	2.3	1.2	9.0	4.5	13.6	5.3	2.8	3
2018	Geelong	26	21	60	29	212	113	325	153	40	2.9	1.4	10.1	5.4	15.5	7.3	1.9	9
2019	Geelong	26	24	56	32	203	106	309	126	37	2.3	1.3	8.5	4.4	12.9	5.3	1.5	5
2020 (Note: The 2020 season was played with 17 home-and-away matches per team (down from 22) and 16-minute quarters with time on (down from 20-minute quarters with time on) due to the impact of the COVID-19 pandemic.)	Geelong	26	21	49	36	172	87	259	113	40	2.3	1.7	8.2	4.1	12.3	5.4	1.9	11
2021	Geelong	26	25	62	37	215	127	342	129	50	2.5	1.5	8.6	5.1	13.7	5.2	2.0	6
2022^{#}	Geelong	26	25	67	43	221	107	328	142	39	2.7	1.7	8.8	4.3	13.1	5.7	1.6	8
2023	Geelong	26	20	49	26	146	68	214	91	18	2.5	1.3	7.3	3.4	10.7	4.6	0.9	7
2024	Geelong	26	12	15	8	67	42	109	35	19	1.3	0.7	5.6	3.5	9.1	2.9	1.6	0
Career			359	796	448	2830	1552	4382	1927	652	2.2	1.2	7.9	4.3	12.2	5.4	1.8	73

== Honours and achievements ==
Team

- 3× AFL premiership player (Geelong): 2009, 2011, 2022
- 4× McClelland Trophy (Geelong): 2007, 2008, 2019, 2022

Individual

- 5× All-Australian team: 2012, 2019, 2020, 2021, 2022(C)
- Coleman Medal: 2020
- 11× Geelong leading goalkicker: 2012, 2013, 2014, 2015, 2016, 2017, 2018, 2019, 2020, 2021, 2022
- Geelong F.C. Community Champion Award: 2019
- Geelong F.C. Tom Harley Award for Best Clubman: 2021
- AFL Rising Star nominee: 2007

== Personal life ==
As well as his father, Hawkins' uncles Michael Hawkins and Robb Hawkins—and his maternal grandfather, Fred Le Deux—all played football for Geelong.

Tom married his long-time love, Emma Clapham during a ceremony at Marcus Hill, Geelong in 2016. The couple have three children together, daughters, Arabella and Primrose and a son, Henry.

Hawkins' nickname "Tomahawk" is a play on his first name and surname, with references to a tomahawk axe or tomahawk missile, and has proven a popular calling card within the league.
