= Peter Robb =

Peter Robb may refer to:

- Peter Robb (author) (born 1946), Australian author
- Peter Robb (rugby union) (born 1994), rugby union player from Ireland
- Peter B. Robb (born 1948), American lawyer; former General Counsel of the National Labor Relations Board
