= Carole Robb =

British painter

Carole Robb (1943) is a British artist and member of the National Academy of Design in New York City. She lives between New York City, Rome, Venice, and London.

== Early life and education ==
Robb was born in Port Glasgow, Scotland in 1943 and studied painting at the Glasgow School of Art (1961–65). She has said that the “Glasgow School of Art shaped my studio discipline; no effort without error, but it was the harsh Scottish weather that shaped the internal life of my imagination.” She also studied at the University of Reading under Terry Frost, where she earned her Master of Fine Arts in 1979. That year she was awarded a British Arts Council award in painting from Greater London Arts Association and won the British Rome Prize in painting from the Royal Commission, London and spent 1979 to 1980 in Rome. Following this she went to New York City on a Fulbright artist fellowship from 1980 to 1981.

== Art practice ==
Robb is a figurative painter, building on the hours of life drawing required at the Glasgow School of Art. Her work engages with mythology, which she first encountered in school, where she studied Greek and Latin. Film is also influential. The compositions in her series Showers with Heroes (2018) extend from her memories of films like Federico Fellini’s La Dolce Vita (1960) and Clint Eastwood's performance in The Good, the Bad and the Ugly (1966).

Robb has exhibited with the Forum Gallery, New York (1982–1996); the Robert Steele Gallery, New York (2006–2008); the Denise Bibro Gallery, New York (2016–2018), and with Tibaldi Arte Contemporanea, Rome (2020). Recently (May 2025) Robb had a solo exhibition of works dealing with climate change in Venice, "Stato da Mar," with Tom Rowland Gallery at GPS London. And in June 2025 she showed related paintings and works on paper at the University Women's Club, London.

Her institutional exhibitions include Arnolfini Gallery, Bristol, UK (1979); National Theatre Gallery London; and the South London Gallery (1983).

Robb was elected a member of the National Academy of Design, New York in 2010.

== Awards and honors ==
Robb received a British Arts Council award in painting (GLAA) in 1979 and a Fulbright Fellowship from the UK to the USA (1980–81). She was awarded numerous artist residencies in the US from 1980 to 1987, including at the MacDowell Colony in New Hampshire (1981).

== Collections ==
Robb's paintings are included in a number of private and public collections, including the Metropolitan Museum of Art, New York; the National Academy Museum of Art, New York, NY; the Victoria & Albert Museum, London; the Imperial War Museum, London; and the Royal Commission for the Exhibition of 1851, London.

== Teaching ==
Robb was visiting artist at various institutions and most recently at the New York Studio School from 1988 to 2004. She was Head of Atelier (Painting) there from 2005 to 2013.

Robb is currently (2022) the artistic director of the Rome Art Program in Italy, which she established in 2009.

== Selected bibliography ==
- Russell, John. "Carole Robb," The New York Times (April 30, 1982). Review of first New York solo exhibition.
- Staff Writer. "Carole Robb At Forum: Scotland Salutes New York?" Art Line New York (1983). Article about Robb representing Scotland in New York exhibition.
- Lichtenstein, Olivia. "Profile: Apollo, Daphne and Carole Robb in the USA," Fulbright Magazine (1986). Discussion of Robb's Fulbright year in the US, with time spent in Appalachia, West Virginia.
- de Francia, Peter. "Carole Robb Pitture recenti," Archimedi (August, 1996). Discussion of first exhibition in Rome.
- Eszenyi, Edina. "Carole Robb: Re-Imagining the Antique," The Florentine (October 22, 2015). Discussion of first exhibition in Florence.
- Pulsford, Mark. "Carole Robb: Stato da Mar," Art-Scot (May, 2025). Introduction to 2025 London, UK exhibition.
