= Michael P. Robb =

American speech-language pathologist and researcher

Michael Paul Robb
- Citizenship: New Zealand, USA
- Education: Western Michigan University; Syracuse University
- Known for: Research on stuttering, infant vocal development, bilingualism, and speech acoustics
- Awards: Fellow of the American Speech-Language-Hearing Association (ASHA); Lifetime Achievement Award, International Association of Communication Sciences and Disorders (IALP); Honors of the Council, Council of Academic Programs in Communication Sciences and Disorders (CAPCSD)
- Scientific career
- Fields: Speech-language pathology, communication sciences, phonetics
- Workplaces: University of Hawaii; University of Connecticut; Pennsylvania State University; University of Canterbury

Michael P. Robb is an American speech-language pathologist, researcher, and academic known for his contributions to the study of stuttering, infant vocal development, bilingualism, and speech acoustics. He completed a PhD titled Acoustic and phonetic characteristics of prelinguistic utterances through the emergence of syntax at Syracuse University Over the course of his career, Robb has held faculty and leadership positions at several universities in the United States and New Zealand, and has published extensively in the field of communication sciences and disorders

== Education ==
Robb earned his Bachelor of Science degree from Western Michigan University, followed by Master of Science and Doctor of Philosophy (Ph.D.) degrees from Syracuse University in communication sciences and disorders.

== Academic career ==
Robb began his academic career in the United States, which included faculty positions at the University of Hawaii, the University of Connecticut, and Pennsylvania State University. He later joined the University of Canterbury in Christchurch, New Zealand, where he served as a professor and researcher in the Department of Communication Disorders. He retired as an Emeritus Professor in the Faculty of Health Sciences.

== Research and publications ==
Robb's research has focused on the acoustic analysis of speech, developmental aspects of vocal behavior in infants, bilingual speech production, and fluency disorders such as stuttering. He has authored or co-authored more than 100 peer-reviewed journal articles and book chapters across the fields of speech science, linguistics, and communication disorders.

He is also the author of INTRO: A Guide for Communication Sciences and Disorders, an introductory textbook for students in the field.

== Editorial and professional service ==
Robb was the founding Editor-in-Chief of Speech, Language and Hearing which is affiliated with the New Zealand Speech Therapists' Association, Hong Kong Association of Speech Therapists, and the Asia Pacific Society of Speech, Language and Hearing. He currently serves as Editor-in-Chief of Folia Phoniatrica et Logopaedica, an international journal that publishes research on voice, speech, and language sciences. He has been active in international professional organizations related to communication sciences and disorders.

== Honors and recognition ==
Robb has received multiple professional honors, including:

- Fellowship of the American Speech-Language-Hearing Association (ASHA)
- Honors of the Council from the Council of Academic Programs in Communication Sciences and Disorders (CAPCSD)
- Lifetime Achievement Award from the International Association of Communication Sciences and Disorders (IALP)

== Selected publications ==
- Robb, M. P. (2024). INTRO: A Guide for Communication Sciences and Disorders.(4th Ed). Plural Pub.
- Robb, M. P., & Colleagues. (1985-present). Articles on stuttering, infant vocal development, and acoustic phonetics in the Journal of Speech, Language and Hearing Research, Clinical Linguistics & Phonetics, Folia Phoniatrica et Logopaedica, and other journals.

== See also ==
- Speech-language pathology
- Phonetics
- Communication disorders
