= Gaberston Mill =

Mill building in Clackmannanshire, Scotland

Coordinates: 56°07′10″N 3°46′53″W

Gaberston Mill was a weaving and spinning mill located in Whins Road Alloa, Scotland founded by David Fraser Lambert (1805–56) in 1837.

== David Lambert ==
Lambert was born in Kirkcaldy and came to Alloa in 1831, after working in the USA. The Lamberts were linked by marriage to the great Clackmannan mill owning families, the Archibalds and Patons (later Thomson-Patons and Forrester-Patons).

David Fraser Lambert married Mary Ann Archibald (1808-1876) in 1835. Mary was a daughter of John Archibald (d.1832), a mill owner in nearby Menstrie. Her brothers Andrew, William, Peter and John owned mills in Alva and Keilarsbrae, Alloa. David and Mary Ann had a son, James (1836-1874), and three daughters, Margaret Fraser (1837-1914), Mary Ann Archibald (1839-1911) and Graeme Haig (1836-1905) who married John Thomson Paton of Norwood (1831-1910) in 1863. John Thomson Paton, a wealthy director of Paton's Mill was the grandson of John Paton (1768-1848) founder of Kilncraigs Mill. Paton was a major benefactor to Alloa providing, amongst other buildings, the Swimming Baths and Leisure Centre, (now the Spiers Centre), Town Hall and Library.

David Lambert died suddenly aged 51 in 1856 and the Mills ownership passed to his son James.

== James Lambert ==
In 1859 Lambert was fined £59 when the HM Inspector of Factories had found 59 workers working after 6pm in contravention of the Act. Robert Ramage, who worked at Gaberston from 1848 to 1858 was an early foreman and manager, with other foreman including John Forfar, foreman weaver William Thomson, foreman tuner Ebenezer Marshall and foreman powerloom weaver Archibald Robertson. Alexander Nicol appears to have been the Manager from 1858 until 1870 when he moved with foreman weaver William Thomson to Devonmills. At this point Andrew Robb (1825-1900), a foreman since at least 1859, became Manager. Other staff included watchman James Stein.

When David Bremner collated his survey of the Industries of Scotland in 1869, it had five sets of carding engines and employed around 300 people.

In late 1873 James Lambert passed the mill business to his mother Mary Ann Lambert, due to poor health. Despite a visit to the Levant to recover he died the following year aged only 33. He was a good friend of the Mill Manager Andrew Robb, both having served in the Clackmannan Rifle Volunteers.

== Weavers strike ==
The year 1874 saw a destructive dispute between management and workers, leading to a strike, which caused much hardship. The Glasgow Herald of May 9, 1874 records the following;

'Alloa – The weavers strike. Strike of powerloom and handloom weavers still continues in Gaberston Mills, Alloa but without extraneous aid it cannot much longer as the funds at the disposal of the ‘strikers’ have become exhausted. For a number of weeks the men on strike were in receipt of 10s per week each and the females 10s but this week there was no money forthcoming. The lock out at the Hillfoots still continues and there is no hope of a settlement'.

And from 29 May 1874, also reported in the Falkirk Herald; 'Alloa –The weavers strike. Although they have no means of support the Alloa Gaberston Mill hands still remain on strike. In the works situated along the foot of the Ochills the disastrous lock out still continues; master and men being seemingly determined to ‘fight it out to the bitter end’. Meanwhile, many of the men are seeking work as labourers and subscription sheets are doing the round of the public works for funds to sustain those on strike’

In August 1876 Gaberston Mill's accountant, David Smith, drowned at Fairlie in a boating accident alongside James Mitchell Robb, Andrew's nephew, a millworker at nearby Keilarsbrae, where his father John Robb (1819-95) was the manager. Both were popular members of the Clackmannan Rifle Volunteers with Corporal Smith interred in Glasgow and Sergeant Robb receiving a military funeral in Alloa with 300 volunteers lining the route.

== Closure ==
The mill closed in November 1877. It was for sale that year when it still had 50 power looms and 30 hand looms. Andrew Robb moved to Peebles to become the manager of Tweedside Mills in Peebles.

In 'Alloa sixty years ago', Archibald describes the mill and its fate in more detail.

'In 1827 he (David Lambert) started a woollen mill at Gaberston, known for long years as Gaberston Mill, and was a busy hive of industry for many years. The shawl trade was at this period in great demand, and Mr Lambert, by close attention to business, and studying the design and quality of his manufactures, got into a large trade, giving employment to several hundred workers'. and 'The other factory was Gaberston Mill, then and for long after chiefly engaged in the shawl and tartan cloth trade. It had a long period of great prosperity, employing several hundred workers; but, alas, owing to the inexorable decrees of fashion, the wearing of shawls has almost entirely gone out. The works might have been adapted to the tweed trades, as others have done, but owing to the death of the founder, the late Mr David Lambert, and, while still in the prime of life, by the death of his son, the late Mr James Lambert, which unfortunate event was ultimately followed by the work being closed altogether.

== Aftermath ==
After closure the mill buildings were utilised for several other uses over the next few decades but in 1910 demolition work began. In 1916 Miss Margaret Fraser Lambert, the last of the Lambert family, left between £4500 and £5500 for the erection of a United Free Church of Scotland, to be named the Lambert Memorial Church in memory of her father, David. The bequest was subject to a legal dispute and by 1924 the Free Church Presbytery decided to refuse it as the site was unsuitable for building, and by then the sum wouldn't have paid for the proposed 500 seat church. The bequest then went to various charities. The site passed to the Alloa Coal Company and in 1928 was leased as children's playing fields. It was later purchased by the Council who built council housing, with Lambert Avenue passing through the centre of the former mill complex site. The mill lade still survives, as does the western stone wall of the original mill complex which forms a boundary between No.72 and No.74 Whins Road. No images are known to survive of the building.
