= Alwyn Davey =

Australian rules footballer

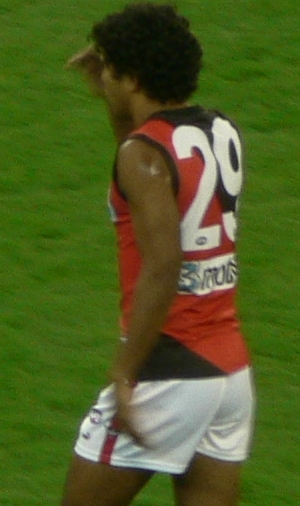

Personal information
- Full name: Alwyn Davey
- Born: 15 May 1984 (age 42); Darwin, Northern Territory
- Original team: South Adelaide (SANFL)
- Draft: No. 36, 2006 national draft
- Height: 174 cm (5 ft 9 in)
- Weight: 76 kg (168 lb)
- Position: Forward

Playing career^{1}
Years	Club	Games (Goals)
2007–2013	Essendon	100 (120)
- ^{1} Playing statistics correct to the end of 2013.

Career highlights
- AFL Army Award 2007; International Rules 2013

Alwyn Davey (born 15 May 1984) is a former Australian rules footballer who played for the Essendon Football Club of the Australian Football League (AFL) between 2007 and 2013.

== Early life ==
Davey is of Indigenous Australian descent with tribal ancestry that can be traced to the Kokatha people in South Australia Alwyn was born to mother Lizzie, named after father Alwyn Davey and raised in Darwin, Northern Territory.

Davey played his junior football in Darwin. His father died when he was eight years old.

Davey moved to Adelaide to play football semi-professionally with South Adelaide in the South Australian National Football League (SANFL).

Davey first attracted the attention of AFL talent scouts after the impressive first and second seasons of his brother Aaron for the Melbourne Football Club.

In the 2006 pre-season, Alwyn was invited to train with his brother at Melbourne, and many believed that the club would take a chance on him. The Demons already had a crumbing forward in Aaron and many clubs were averse to drafting short players. Furthermore, by the time of the draft, Alwyn had turned 22. Most draftees are taken at just 18, making him considered old for the national draft. Most therefore had picked Alwyn Davey to be taken by Melbourne as with a rookie selection.

Essendon coach Kevin Sheedy had become particularly interested in the progress of Aaron Davey and since the success of Andrew Lovett, fast indigenous players in general. Davey was drafted by the Bombers in the 3rd round of the 2006 AFL draft.

== Career ==
=== 2007 ===
Davey made his AFL debut in the opening round of the 2007 season, making an immediate impression and played in every game until Round 14.

He has featured several times amongst the Bombers' best including an outstanding ANZAC Day match. In his first five AFL matches he earned five “goal of the year” nominations including two on ANZAC Day.

Davey became known for his explosive speed. He has been known to take 2.75 secs to run from 0–20 metres. This is thought to be the fastest in the league, even more than speedster Chris Judd. From debut, Davey became one of the shortest players in the AFL.

He quickly earned a cult following at Essendon, gaining the nickname is "Froggy", due to his appearance.

During the round 14 game against Geelong, he suffered a broken arm when crashed into while on the ground by Kane Tenace. The injury forced Davey to miss the rest of the season, and Essendon's form slumped during the period that he was on the sidelines, eventually missing the finals.

At the end of the 2007 AFL season, Alwyn won the AFL Army Award, recognising players who produce act(s) of bravery or selflessness to promote the cause of his team, during a game for his smother and 2nd and 3rd efforts against Hawthorn in round 6. He had 3 of the final 6 nominations in the award.

=== 2008 ===
While running at training after round Four in 2008, Davey twisted and injured his right knee when changing direction, requiring immediate surgery and making him unavailable for the rest of the season because this would require him to miss between 6 and 12 months. Despite the injury, Davey continued to train but coach Matthew Knights did not risk him.

=== 2009 ===
In 2009, his defensive pressure in the forward line has been a welcome return to the Essendon squad, currently leading the tackle count.

=== 2013 ===
In 2013, Essendon Football Club announced that Alwyn Davey would not be offered a contract for the 2014 AFL season.

== Personal life ==
Alwyn and Aaron Davey are cousins of Brownlow medallist Gavin Wanganeen. Alwyn was named after his father.

Davey's twin sons, Alwyn Jr and Jayden were drafted to Essendon in the 2022 AFL draft, under the father–son rule.

== Statistics ==
Legend
G	Goals	K	Kicks	D	Disposals	T	Tackles
B	Behinds	H	Handballs	M	Marks

Season	Team	No.	Games	Totals							Averages (per game)							Votes
Season	Team	No.	Games	G	B	K	H	D	M	T	G	B	K	H	D	M	T	Votes
2007	Essendon	29	14	15	10	94	67	161	46	54	1.1	0.7	6.7	4.8	11.5	3.3	3.9	2
2008	Essendon	29	5	5	1	33	38	71	10	23	1.0	0.2	6.6	7.6	14.2	2.0	4.6	0
2009	Essendon	29	20	14	13	141	131	272	48	87	0.7	0.6	7.0	6.6	13.6	2.4	4.4	1
2010	Essendon	29	16	22	14	104	103	207	34	86	1.4	0.9	6.5	6.4	12.9	2.1	5.4	0
2011	Essendon	29	14	16	8	74	68	142	29	63	1.1	0.6	5.3	4.9	10.1	2.1	4.5	0
2012	Essendon	29	17	29	21	121	79	200	33	66	1.7	1.2	7.1	4.6	11.8	1.9	3.9	0
2013	Essendon	29	14	19	12	78	55	133	25	46	1.4	0.9	5.6	3.9	9.5	1.8	3.3	0
Career			100	120	79	645	541	1186	225	425	1.2	0.8	6.5	5.4	11.9	2.3	4.3	3
