= 2006 Geelong Football Club season =

Geelong Football Club
2006 season
- President: Frank Costa
- Coach: Mark Thompson (7th season)
- Captains: Steven King (4th season)
- Home ground: Skilled Stadium
- Pre-season competition: Premiers
- AFL season: 10th
- Finals series: Did not qualify
- Best and Fairest: Paul Chapman
- Leading goalkicker: Gary Ablett, Jr. (35)

The 2006 Geelong Football Club season was the club's 107th season in the Australian Football League (AFL). Geelong finished the regular season in tenth position on the ladder, resulting in the club not qualifying for the finals.

== Captains ==
- Captain: Steven King
- Vice-Captains: Cameron Ling, Tom Harley, Matthew Scarlett

== Club list ==
=== Player list ===
Players are listed in alphabetical order by surname, and statistics are for AFL regular season and finals series matches during the 2006 AFL season only.

Player	#	AFL debut	Games	Goals	Behinds	Kicks	Handballs	Disposals	Marks	Tackles
Gary Ablett, Jr.	29	2002	21	35	28	212	142	354	74	65
Nathan Ablett	23	2005	7	4	3	33	23	56	27	5
Jimmy Bartel	3	2002	21	15	12	297	187	484	139	79
Mark Blake	24	2005	8	0	0	12	45	57	16	9
Shannon Byrnes	17	2004	10	3	11	100	47	147	58	26
Tim Callan	7	2003	6	0	0	32	32	64	19	12
Paul Chapman	35	2000	22	31	19	331	153	484	134	89
Joel Corey	11	2000	22	8	4	298	231	529	107	64
Matthew Egan	19	2005	22	1	0	102	130	232	82	31
Corey Enright	44	2001	22	11	2	327	164	491	139	64
Ryan Gamble	34	2006	1	0	0	5	3	8	4	1
Charlie Gardiner	16	2002	5	4	2	45	30	75	25	13
Tom Harley	2	1998	13	0	0	88	71	159	60	18
Josh Hunt	8	2001	22	4	4	239	152	391	96	49
David Johnson	28	2002	17	5	1	152	69	221	80	34
Steve Johnson	20	2002	15	30	13	139	60	199	70	22
James Kelly	9	2002	15	7	2	134	119	253	48	40
Steven King	1	1996	16	1	1	116	97	213	67	23
Kent Kingsley	18	1999	9	10	8	46	20	66	36	8
Paul Koulouriotis	14	2000	1	0	0	5	9	14	2	3
Cameron Ling	45	2000	22	10	3	248	255	503	131	61
Tom Lonergan	13	2005	3	1	2	17	7	24	12	5
Andrew Mackie	4	2004	14	10	10	150	70	220	75	26
Matthew McCarthy	26	2003	4	6	1	22	7	29	17	5
Darren Milburn	39	1997	22	4	8	242	209	451	167	49
Cameron Mooney	21	1999	17	22	8	177	82	259	124	20
Brad Ottens	6	1998	22	26	20	139	104	243	104	45
Stephen Owen	31	—	—	—	—	—	—	—	—	—
Henry Playfair	22	2003	8	5	5	32	33	65	41	11
Brent Prismall	32	2006	8	4	2	72	34	106	30	11
Peter Riccardi	15	1992	6	3	2	50	21	71	20	10
Max Rooke	33	2002	17	8	1	114	121	235	62	55
Matthew Scarlett	30	1998	20	4	2	237	87	324	109	22
Matthew Spencer	25	2006	2	0	0	3	6	9	2	3
Mathew Stokes	27	2006	9	9	5	72	45	117	51	23
Kane Tenace	10	2004	14	3	1	150	51	201	47	23
Travis Varcoe	5	—^{[a]}	—	—	—	—	—	—	—	—
Trent West	12	—^{[b]}	—	—	—	—	—	—	—	—
David Wojcinski	40	1999	15	1	6	116	80	196	45	30

=== Rookie list ===
Players are listed in alphabetical order by surname, and statistics are for AFL regular season and finals series matches during the 2006 AFL season only.

Player	#	AFL debut	Games	Goals	Behinds	Kicks	Handballs	Disposals	Marks	Tackles
Nick Batchelor*	42	—	—	—	—	—	—	—	—	—
Todd Grima	36	—	—	—	—	—	—	—	—	—
Sam Hunt	38	2002	—	—	—	—	—	—	—	—
Tim Sheringham	41	—	—	—	—	—	—	—	—	—
Will Slade*	37	2002	6	1	1	32	31	63	21	7

- * Nominated rookie (Elevated to senior list during season, eligible for senior selection)

== Games ==
=== NAB Cup ===
**Round**	**Date and local time**	**Opponent**	**Scores** (Geelong's scores indicated in **bold**)			**Venue**	**Attendance**
**Round**	**Date and local time**	**Opponent**	Home	Away	Result	**Venue**	**Attendance**
1	Saturday, 25 February (7:40 pm)	Carlton	1.8.13 (70)	**0.15.8 (98)**	Won by 28 points	Telstra Dome ^{[A]}	13,518
QF	Saturday, 3 March (7:40 pm)	Kangaroos	1.8.3 (60)	**1.10.17 (86)**	Won by 26 points	Cazaly's Stadium ^{[A]}	7,824
SF	Saturday, 11 March (7:40 pm)	Fremantle	**3.10.14 (101)**	1.10.12 (81)	Won by 20 points	Telstra Dome ^{[H]}	12,042
GF	Saturday, 18 March (7:20 pm)	Adelaide	1.10.15 (84)	**3.10.5 (92)**	Won by 8 points	AAMI Stadium ^{[A]}	30,707
Geelong were the 2006 NAB Cup premiers.

=== Regular season ===
**Round**	**Date and local time**	**Opponent**	**Scores** (Geelong's scores indicated in **bold**)			**Venue**	**Attendance**	**Ladder** **position**
**Round**	**Date and local time**	**Opponent**	Home	Away	Result	**Venue**	**Attendance**	**Ladder** **position**
1	Saturday, 1 April (2:10 pm)	Brisbane Lions	**17.13 (115)**	5.8 (38)	Won by 77 points	Skilled Stadium ^{[H]}	23,029	2nd
2	Saturday, 8 April (2:10 pm)	Kangaroos	**22.6 (138)**	10.9 (69)	Won by 69 points	Skilled Stadium ^{[H]}	22,839	1st
3	Saturday, 15 April (2:10 pm)	Hawthorn	**6.13 (49)**	15.11 (101)	Lost by 52 points	Skilled Stadium ^{[H]}	24,026	3rd
4	Saturday, 22 April (2:15 pm)	Western Bulldogs	14.14 (98)	**14.13 (97)**	Lost by 1 point	Telstra Dome ^{[A]}	45,922	6th
5	Saturday, 29 April (7:10 pm)	Sydney	15.17 (107)	**13.7 (85)**	Lost by 22 points	Telstra Stadium ^{[A]}	37,032	7th
6	Friday, 5 May (7:40 pm)	Melbourne	13.9 (87)	**11.15 (81)**	Lost by 6 points	MCG ^{[A]}	36,041	11th
7	Friday, 12 May (7:40 pm)	St Kilda	9.10 (64)	**12.10 (82)**	Won by 18 points	Telstra Dome ^{[A]}	48,313	9th
8	Saturday, 20 May (7:10 pm)	Collingwood	22.14 (146)	**6.8 (44)**	Lost by 102 points	MCG ^{[A]}	69,819	11th
9	Saturday, 27 May (2:10 pm)	Richmond	**12.8 (90)**	17.8 (110)	Lost by 20 points	Skilled Stadium ^{[H]}	23,386	12th
10	Saturday, 3 June (2:10 pm)	West Coast	**15.8 (98)**	16.5 (101)	Lost by 3 points	Skilled Stadium ^{[H]}	20,428	13th
11	Friday, 9 June (7:40 pm)	Essendon	**20.10 (130)**	13.10 (88)	Won by 42 points	MCG ^{[H]}	43,600	11th
12	Saturday, 17 June (2:10 pm)	Fremantle	6.16 (52)	**18.10 (118)**	Won by 66 points	Subiaco Oval ^{[A]}	34,236	11th
13	Sunday, 2 July (12:40 pm)	Adelaide	21.21 (147)	**8.7 (55)**	Lost by 92 points	AAMI Stadium ^{[A]}	41,752	11th
14	Saturday, 8 July (2:10 pm)	Carlton	11.11 (77)	**23.4 (142)**	Won by 65 points	Telstra Dome ^{[A]}	32,096	10th
15	Sunday, 16 July (1:10 pm)	Port Adelaide	**9.14 (68)**	8.10 (58)	Won by 10 points	Skilled Stadium ^{[H]}	19,149	10th
16	Sunday, 23 July (2:10 pm)	Western Bulldogs	**13.12 (90)**	13.11 (89)	Won by 1 point	Telstra Dome ^{[H]}	39,417	9th
17	Sunday, 30 July (1:10 pm)	Kangaroos	13.12 (90)	**8.12 (60)**	Lost by 30 points	Manuka Oval ^{[A]}	9,561	9th
18	Sunday, 6 August (1:10 pm)	Brisbane Lions	13.9 (87)	**14.20 (104)**	Won by 17 points	The Gabba ^{[A]}	28,055	9th
19	Sunday, 13 August (2:10 pm)	St Kilda	**11.14 (80)**	15.13 (103)	Lost by 23 points	Telstra Dome ^{[H]}	40,986	9th
20	Saturday, 19 August (2:10 pm)	Sydney	**14.6 (90)**	9.9 (63)	Won by 27 points	Skilled Stadium ^{[H]}	21,775	9th
21	Saturday, 26 August (2:10 pm)	Melbourne	**14.10 (94)**	14.10 (94)	Draw	Skilled Stadium ^{[H]}	23,068	10th
22	Sunday, 3 September (2:10 pm)	Hawthorn	21.7 (133)	**10.12 (72)**	Lost by 61 points	Telstra Dome ^{[A]}	28,188	10th

=== Exhibition match ===
Following the end of the 2006 AFL season, Geelong travelled to London for an exhibition match against Port Adelaide. In a chaotic match at The Oval, an inexperienced Geelong squad defeated Port Adelaide 13.10 (88) to 10.7 (67) in front of 12,129 fans to win the AFL Challenge Trophy. The match was the club's first international exhibition match since they travelled to Auckland in 1991.

== Ladder ==
2006 AFL ladder
Pos	Team	Pld	W	L	D	PF	PA	PP	Pts	
1	West Coast (P)	22	17	5	0	2257	1874	120.4	68	Finals series
2	Adelaide	22	16	6	0	2331	1640	142.1	64	Finals series
3	Fremantle	22	15	7	0	2079	1893	109.8	60	Finals series
4	Sydney	22	14	8	0	2098	1630	128.7	56	Finals series
5	Collingwood	22	14	8	0	2345	1965	119.3	56	Finals series
6	St Kilda	22	14	8	0	2074	1752	118.4	56	Finals series
7	Melbourne	22	13	8	1	2146	1957	109.7	54	Finals series
8	Western Bulldogs	22	13	9	0	2311	2173	106.4	52	Finals series
9	Richmond	22	11	11	0	1934	2245	86.1	44	
10	Geelong	22	10	11	1	1982	2002	99.0	42	
11	Hawthorn	22	9	13	0	1834	2140	85.7	36	
12	Port Adelaide	22	8	14	0	1911	2151	88.8	32	
13	Brisbane Lions	22	7	15	0	1844	2239	82.4	28	
14	Kangaroos	22	7	15	0	1754	2167	80.9	28	
15	Essendon	22	3	18	1	2021	2469	81.9	14	
16	Carlton	22	3	18	1	1791	2415	74.2	14	

Source: AFL ladder
Rules for classification: 1) points; 2) percentage; 3) number of points for.
(P) Premiers

== Notes ==
Key

- ^[H] Home match.
- ^[A] Away match.

General notes

- ^{a} Travis Varcoe made his AFL debut for Geelong in 2007.
- ^{b} Trent West made his AFL debut for Geelong in 2008.

== See also ==
- 2006 AFL Season
- Geelong Football Club
