= 2007 Geelong Football Club season =

Geelong Football Club
2007 season
- President: Frank Costa
- Coach: Mark Thompson (8th season)
- Captains: Tom Harley (1st season)
- Home ground: Skilled Stadium
- Pre-season competition: Semi-final
- AFL season: 1st
- Finals series: Premiers
- Best and Fairest: Gary Ablett, Jr.
- Leading goalkicker: Cameron Mooney (67)

The 2007 Geelong Football Club season was the club's 108th season in the Australian Football League (AFL). Geelong finished the regular season in first position on the ladder, earning the club its eighth McClelland Trophy.

== Captains ==
- Captain: Tom Harley
- Vice-Captain: Cameron Ling
- Deputy Vice-Captain: Cameron Mooney

== Club List ==
=== Player List ===
Name	No.	Height	Weight	Birthdate	Debut	Previous clubs	Games				Goals
Name	No.	Height	Weight	Birthdate	Debut	Previous clubs	2006	2007	Total	Club	2007	Total
Ablett, Gary	29	182	86	14 May 1984	2002	Modewarre / Geelong U18	21	22	122	122	26	161
Ablett, Nathan	23	198	98	13 December 1985	2005	Modewarre	7	18	29	29	28	40
Bartel, Jimmy	3	186	86	4 December 1983	2002	Bell Park / Geelong U18	21	20	105	105	15	59
Blake, Mark	24	200	100	9 September 1985	2005	South Barwon / Geelong U18	8	20	31	31	2	2
Byrnes, Shannon	17	175	77	7 April 1984	2004	Shepparton / Murray U18	10	9	42	42	6	18
Callan, Tim	7	181	81	6 January 1984	2003	St. Josephs (VCFL) / Geelong U18	6	0	15	15	0	3
Chapman, Paul	35	179	88	5 November 1981	2000	North Coburg Saints / Calder U18	22	16	133	133	20	161
Corey, Joel	11	191	87	17 February 1982	2000	East Perth (WAFL)	22	22	148	148	6	48
Djerrkura, Nathan	18	176	80	19 September 1988	****	Wanderers (NT)	0	0	0	0	0	0
Egan, Matthew	19	196	101	10 July 1983	2005	Oak Park / Geelong VFL	22	22	59	59	0	1
Enright, Corey	44	187	91	14 September 1981	2001	Port Adelaide (SANFL)	22	21	122	122	7	37
Gamble, Ryan	15	184	78	23 September 1987	2006	Glenelg (SANFL)	1	0	1	1	0	0
Gardiner, Charlie	16	190	91	1 March 1983	2002	Geelong Grammar / Sandringham U18	5	2	51	51	1	25
Harley, Tom	2	193	95	18 July 1978	1998	Norwood (SANFL) / Port Adelaide	13	14	156	155	1	10
Hawkins, Tom	26	197	105	27 July 1988	2007	Melbourne Grammar / Sandringham U18	0	9	9	9	12	12
Hogan, Simon	34	182	72	16 August 1988	****	Warrnambool / Geelong U18	0	0	0	0	0	0
Hunt, Josh	8	185	100	14 March 1982	2001	Mildura Imperials / Bendigo U18	22	13	96	96	3	13
Hunt, Sam	38	193	92	13 April 1983	2002	St Josephs (VCFL) / Geelong U18 / Essendon	0	0	7	0	0	1
Johnson, David	28	181	84	28 October 1981	2002	Sunbury / Calder U18 / Essendon Rookie List	17	12	70	70	3	16
Johnson, Steve	20	189	89	4 July 1983	2002	Wangaratta / Murray U18	15	17	84	84	41	149
Kelly, James	9	183	85	29 December 1983	2002	Rupertswood / Calder U18	15	20	105	105	10	52
King, Steven	1	201	105	22 November 1978	1996	Shepparton / Murray U18	16	5	192	192	0	75
Ling, Cameron	45	189	94	27 February 1981	2000	St Josephs (VCFL) / Geelong U18	22	21	156	156	27	90
Mackie, Andrew	4	192	84	7 August 1984	2004	Glenelg (SANFL)	14	21	58	58	11	39
Milburn, Darren	39	190	92	15 April 1977	1997	Kilmore / Calder U18	22	22	210	210	5	80
Mooney, Cameron	21	198	99	26 September 1979	1999	Turvey Park / NSW-ACT U18 / Kangaroos	17	22	141	130	55	142
Ottens, Brad	6	204	108	25 January 1980	1998	Glenelg (SANFL) / Richmond	22	19	185	56	17	218
Owen, Stephen	31	189	86	19 July 1987	****	North Ballarat / North Ballarat U18	0	0	0	0	0	0
Playfair, Henry	22	198	100	22 January 1983	2003	North Shore (NSW) / NSW-ACT U18	8	1	52	52	0	29
Prismall, Brent	32	184	87	14 July 1986	2006	Werribee / Western U18	8	5	13	13	3	7
Rooke, Max	33	189	92	19 December 1981	2002	Casterton	17	5	89	89	4	19
Scarlett, Matthew	30	192	95	5 June 1979	1998	St Josephs (VCFL) / Geelong U18	20	21	181	181	1	16
Selwood, Joel	14	182	82	26 May 1988	2007	Sandhurst / Bendigo U18	0	18	18	18	7	7
Spencer, Matthew	25	194	98	17 January 1985	2006	Swan Districts (WAFL)	2	0	2	2	0	0
Stokes, Mathew	27	177	80	22 November 1984	2006	Woodville-West Torrens (SANFL)	9	18	27	27	28	37
Tenace, Kane	10	182	86	4 July 1985	2004	Shepparton / Murray U18	14	9	53	53	1	11
Varcoe, Travis	5	180	78	10 April 1988	2007	Central District (SANFL)	0	18	18	18	15	15
West, Trent	12	198	102	17 October 1987	****	Wonthaggi / Gippsland U18	0	0	0	0	0	0
Wojcinski, David	40	180	80	18 September 1980	1999	Heyfield / Gippsland U18	15	22	115	115	14	37
Statistics are to end of Round 22, 2007 Season (1 September 2007)

=== Rookie List ===
Name	No.	Height	Weight	Birthdate	Debut	Previous clubs	Games				Goals
Name	No.	Height	Weight	Birthdate	Debut	Previous clubs	2006	2007	Total	Club	2007	Total
Bedford, Liam	42	180	70	12 July 1988	****	Claremont (WAFL)	0	0	0	0	0	0
Davenport, Jason	41	185	82	4 September 1985	****	Geelong VFL	0	0	0	0	0	0
Grima, Todd	36	192	88	5 February 1987	****	North Launceston / Tasmania U18	0	0	0	0	0	0
Lonergan, Tom	13	197	97	17 May 1984	2005	Yarrawonga / Calder U18	3	0	7	7	0	6
Reynolds, Joel	37	188	84	5 June 1984	2002	St Josephs (VCFL) / Geelong U18 / Essendon	11	0	38	0	0	13
Statistics are to end of Round 22, 2007 Season (1 September 2007)

=== Changes from 2006 List ===
==== Additions ====
- Exchange period – received:
  - None
- Rookie elevation:
- Father/son selection:
1. Tom Hawkins
- NAB AFL Draft (25 November 2006):
1. Joel Selwood (Round 1; Overall pick 7; from Bendigo Pioneers)
2. Nathan Djerrkura (Round 2; Overall pick 25; from Wanderers Football Club)
3. Tom Hawkins (Round 3; Overall pick 41; from Sandringham Dragons)
4. Simon Hogan (Round 4; Overall pick 57; from Geelong Falcons)
- NAB AFL Pre-Season Draft:
  - None
- NAB AFL Rookie Draft (13 December 2006):
1. Joel Reynolds (Round 1; Overall pick 7; from Essendon)
2. Liam Bedford (Round 2; Overall pick 23: from Claremont Football Club)
3. Jason Davenport (Round 3; Overall pick 38; Geelong VFL)
4. Tom Lonergan (Round 4; Overall pick 50; Redrafted as Rookie)

==== Deletions ====
- Delisted:
1. Kent Kingsley – to Richmond (2007 Pre-season Draft)
- Retirements:
1. Peter Riccardi

== Games ==
=== NAB Cup ===
Date and Local Time	Opponent	Home or Away	Venue	Scores
Date and Local Time	Opponent	Home or Away	Venue	Result	Home	Away
First round
Sunday, 25 February – 3:40 pm	Richmond	Home	Skilled Stadium	Won by 43	3.17.10 (139)	1.14.3 (96)
Quarter-finals
Saturday, 3 March – 7:10 pm	Port Adelaide	Home	TIO Stadium	Won by 3 (aet)	0.9.6 (60)	0.7.15 (57)
Semi-finals (Eliminated)
Friday, 9 March – 7:40 pm	Brisbane Lions	Away	Telstra Dome	Lost by 12	3.8.10 (85)	0.10.13 (73)

=== Premiership season ===
Round	Date and Local Time	Opponent	Home or Away	Venue	Scores			Ladder Pos'n
Round	Date and Local Time	Opponent	Home or Away	Venue	Result	Home	Away	Ladder Pos'n
1	Sunday, 1 April – 2:10 pm	Western Bulldogs	Away	Telstra Dome	Lost by 20	17.11 (113)	13.15 (93)	13
2	Saturday, 7 April – 7:15 pm	Carlton Blues	Home	Telstra Dome	Won by 78	24.18 (162)	12.12 (84)	5
3	Sunday, 15 April – 2:10 pm	Melbourne Demons	Away	MCG	Won by 52	8.9 (57)	15.19 (109)	2
4	Sunday, 22 April – 1:10 pm	Hawthorn Hawks	Away	Aurora Stadium	Lost by 4	10.16 (76)	9.18 (72)	6
5	Sunday, 29 April – 2:15 pm	Kangaroos	Home	Skilled Stadium	Lost by 16	15.12 (102)	18.10 (118)	10
6	Sunday, 6 May – 5:10 pm	Richmond	Away	Telstra Dome	Won by 157	9.11 (65)	35.12 (222)	6
7	Sunday, 13 May – 1:10 pm	West Coast	Home	Skilled Stadium	Won by 39	16.13 (109)	10.10 (70)	4
8	Saturday, 19 May – 2:10 pm	Fremantle	Home	Skilled Stadium	Won by 25	14.10 (94)	10.9 (69)	3
9	Saturday, 27 May – 2:10 pm	Port Adelaide	Away	AAMI Stadium	Won by 56	8.12 (60)	16.20 (116)	2
10	Sunday, 3 June – 5:10 pm	St Kilda	Away	Telstra Dome	Won by 60	9.11 (65)	19.11 (125)	2
11	Sunday, 10 June – 12:40 pm	Adelaide	Away	AAMI Stadium	Won by 7	9.8 (62)	9.15 (69)	1
12	Sunday, 17 June – 1:10 pm	Brisbane Lions	Home	Skilled Stadium	Won by 50	12.13 (85)	5.5 (35)	1
13	Saturday, 30 June – 2:10 pm	Sydney	Home	Skilled Stadium	Won by 18	13.9 (87)	10.9 (69)	1
14	Friday, 6 July – 7:40 pm	Essendon	Away	Telstra Dome	Won by 50	12.11 (83)	19.19 (133)	1
15	Saturday, 14 July – 2:10 pm	Collingwood	Home	MCG	Won by 16	11.14 (80)	9.10 (64)	1
16	Friday, 20 July – 7:40 pm	Western Bulldogs	Home	Telstra Dome	Won by 75	20.18 (138)	9.9 (63)	1
17	Saturday, 28 July – 2:10 pm	Fremantle	Away	Subiaco	Won by 68	10.12 (72)	20.20 (140)	1
18	Saturday, 4 August – 2:10 pm	Richmond	Home	Skilled Stadium	Won by 70	21.13 (139)	11.6 (69)	1
19	Sunday, 12 August – 2:10 pm	Adelaide	Home	Skilled Stadium	Won by 33	15.13 (103)	10.10 (70)	1
20	Sunday, 19 August – 2:10 pm	Kangaroos	Away	Telstra Dome	Won by 27	13.13 (97)	17.16 (118)	1
21	Sunday, 26 August – 2:10 pm	Port Adelaide	Home	Skilled Stadium	Lost by 5	15.11 (101)	16.10 (106)	1
22	Saturday, 1 September – 7:10 pm	Brisbane Lions	Away	The Gabba	Won by 42	15.13 (103)	22.13 (145)	1

=== Finals ===
Date and Local Time	Opponent	Home or Away	Venue	Scores
Date and Local Time	Opponent	Home or Away	Venue	Result	Home	Away
Qualifying and Elimination Finals
Sunday, 9 – 2 September:45 pm	Kangaroos	Home	MCG	Won by 106	23.18 (156)	8.2 (50)
Preliminary Finals
Friday, 21 – 7 September.50 pm	Collingwood	Home	MCG	Won by 5	13.14 (92)	13.9 (87)
Grand Final
Saturday, 29 – 2 September.30 pm	Port Adelaide	Home	MCG	Won by 119	24.19 (163)	6.8 (44)

== See also ==
- 2007 AFL Season
- Geelong Football Club
