= 2005 Geelong Football Club season =

Geelong Football Club
2005 season
- President: Frank Costa
- Coach: Mark Thompson (6th season)
- Captains: Steven King (3rd season)
- Home ground: Skilled Stadium
- Pre-season competition: Quarter-final
- AFL season: 6th
- Finals series: Semi-finalist
- Best and Fairest: Joel Corey
- Leading goalkicker: Kent Kingsley (57)

The 2005 Geelong Football Club season was the club's 106th season in the Australian Football League (AFL). Geelong finished the regular season in sixth position on the ladder. After defeating Melbourne in the Elimination Final they were defeated by Sydney in the Semi-final at the SCG.

== Captains ==
Captain: Steven King

Vice-Captain: Cameron Ling

== Games ==
=== Premiership season ===
Round	Date and Local Time	Opponent	Home or Away	Venue	Scores			Posn on Ladder
Round	Date and Local Time	Opponent	Home or Away	Venue	Result	Home	Away	Posn on Ladder
1	Sunday, 27 March – 2:15 pm	Richmond	Away	MCG	Won by 62	15.8 (98)	25.10 (160)	4
2	Saturday, 2 April – 5:40 pm	West Coast	Away	Subiaco Oval	Lost by 22	12.12 (84)	8.14 (62)	6
3	Friday, 8 April – 7:40 pm	Melbourne	Away	MCG	Lost by 48	18.6 (114)	8.18 (66)	10
4	Saturday, 16 April – 7:10 pm	Essendon	Home	Telstra Dome	Won by 56	19.17 (131)	11.9 (75)	6
5	Friday, 22 April – 8:10 pm	Port Adelaide	Away	Football Park	Won by 4	15.5 (95)	15.9 (99)	6
6	Sunday, 1 May – 1:10 pm	Western Bulldogs	Home	Skilled Stadium	Won by 35	16.12 (108)	11.7 (73)	5
7	Saturday, 7 May – 2:10 pm	St Kilda	Home	Telstra Dome	Won by 18	18.11 (119)	15.11 (101)	3
8	Friday, 13 May – 7:40 pm	Carlton	Away	Telstra Dome	Won by 70	10.13 (73)	22.11 (143)	2
9	Sunday, 22 May – 2:10 pm	Kangaroos	Home	Skilled Stadium	Won by 85	22.14 (146)	8.13 (61)	2
10	Saturday, 28 May – 2:10 pm	Fremantle	Home	Skilled Stadium	Lost by 9	11.16 (82)	14.7 (91)	2
11	Friday, 3 June – 7:40 pm	Collingwood	Away	Telstra Dome	Lost by 25	18.13 (121)	14.12 (96)	4
12	Sunday, 12 June – 2:10 pm	Adelaide	Home	Skilled Stadium	Won by 4	9.7 (61)	8.9 (57)	3
13	Sunday, 19 June – 1:10 pm	Brisbane Lions	Away	The Gabba	Lost by 69	17.14 (116)	6.11 (47)	4
14	Sunday, 3 July – 2:10 pm	Hawthorn	Home	Telstra Dome	Won by 55	16.17 (113)	8.10 (58)	3
15	Saturday, 9 July – 7:10 pm	Sydney	Away	SCG	Lost by 54	16.9 (105)	7.9 (51)	3
16	Saturday, 16 July – 2:10 pm	Port Adelaide	Home	Skilled Stadium	Won by 79	18.18 (126)	7.5 (47)	3
17	Saturday, 23 July – 2:10 pm	Western Bulldogs	Away	Telstra Dome	Lost by 35	20.13 (133)	14.14 (98)	5
18	Friday, 29 July – 7:40 pm	Essendon	Away	Telstra Dome	Lost by 13	16.11 (107)	13.16 (94)	6
19	Friday, 5 August – 7:40 pm	St Kilda	Away	Telstra Dome	Lost by 41	13.18 (96)	8.7 (55)	7
20	Saturday, 13 August – 2:10 pm	Melbourne	Home	Skilled Stadium	Lost by 1	15.9 (99)	14.16 (100)	6
21	Saturday, 20 August – 2:10 pm	West Coast	Home	Skilled Stadium	Won by 76	16.13 (109)	5.3 (33)	6
22	Sunday, 28 August – 2:10 pm	Richmond	Home	Skilled Stadium	Won by 1	10.9 (69)	10.8 (68)	6

=== Finals ===
Date and Local Time	Opponent	Home or Away	Venue	Scores
Date and Local Time	Opponent	Home or Away	Venue	Result	Home	Away
Qualifying and Elimination Finals
Saturday, 3 September – 2:30 pm	Melbourne	Home	MCG	Won by 55	18.8 (116)	9.7 (61)
Semi-finals
Friday, 9 September, 8:00 pm	Sydney	Away	SCG	Lost by 3	7.14 (56)	7.11 (53)

== See also ==
- 2005 AFL season
- Geelong Football Club
