= 2005 AFL finals series =

2005 AFL premiership season
- Date: 2–24 September 2005
- Teams: 8
- Premiers: Sydney; 4th premiership
- Runners-up: West Coast (4th grand final)
- Minor premiers: Adelaide; 1st minor premiership

Attendance
- Matches played: 9
- Total attendance: 480,064 (53,340 per match)
- Highest: 91,828 Grand Final, West Coast vs. Sydney)

The Australian Football League's 2005 finals series began on the weekend of 2 September 2005 and ended with the 109th AFL Grand Final at the Melbourne Cricket Ground on 24 September 2005. The Sydney Swans defeated West Coast, breaking their record 72-year drought between premierships. The top eight teams on the home and away rounds (regular season) ladder qualify for the Finals Series.

== Ladder ==
2005 AFL ladder
Pos	Team	Pld	W	L	D	PF	PA	PP	Pts	
1	Adelaide	22	17	5	0	2070	1517	136.5	68	Finals series
2	West Coast	22	17	5	0	2261	1824	124.0	68	Finals series
3	Sydney (P)	22	15	7	0	1974	1696	116.4	60	Finals series
4	St Kilda	22	14	8	0	2407	1806	133.3	56	Finals series
5	Kangaroos	22	13	9	0	2053	2069	99.2	52	Finals series
6	Geelong	22	12	10	0	2134	1906	112.0	48	Finals series
7	Melbourne	22	12	10	0	2171	2266	95.8	48	Finals series
8	Port Adelaide	22	11	10	1	2028	2066	98.2	46	Finals series
9	Western Bulldogs	22	11	11	0	2385	2351	101.4	44	
10	Fremantle	22	11	11	0	2041	2038	100.1	44	
11	Brisbane Lions	22	10	12	0	2139	2164	98.8	40	
12	Richmond	22	10	12	0	2022	2190	92.3	40	
13	Essendon	22	8	14	0	2118	2302	92.0	32	
14	Hawthorn	22	5	17	0	1904	2317	82.2	20	
15	Collingwood	22	5	17	0	1884	2425	77.7	20	
16	Carlton	22	4	17	1	2016	2670	75.5	18	

Source: AFL ladder
Rules for classification: 1) points; 2) percentage; 3) number of points for.
(P) Premiers

Separated only by percentage Adelaide (minor premier) and West Coast topped the ladder (W-L: 17–5), trailed by third placed Sydney (15–7). The matchups for the first round of finals were only set after all matches of the final home-and-away game had been completed.

== Results ==
Qualifying and elimination finals
3 Sep, AAMI Stadium
1	Adelaide	8.9 (57)
4	St Kilda	10.5 (65)
4 Sep, Telstra Dome
5	Kangaroos	11.11 (77)
8	Port Adelaide	26.8 (164)
3 Sep, MCG
6	Geelong	18.8 (116)
7	Melbourne	9.7 (61)
2 Sep, Subiaco Oval
2	West Coast	10.9 (69)
3	Sydney	10.5 (65)

Semi-finals
10 Sep, AAMI Stadium
Adelaide	18.15 (123)
Port Adelaide	5.10 (40)
9 Sep, SCG
Sydney	7.14 (56)
Geelong	7.11 (53)

Preliminary finals
16 Sep, MCG
St Kilda	9.11 (65)
Sydney	15.6 (96)
17 Sep, Subiaco Oval
West Coast	14.9 (93)
Adelaide	11.11 (77)

Grand final
24 Sep, MCG
Sydney	8.10 (58)
West Coast	7.12 (54)

== The finals system ==
The system is a final eight system. This system is different from the McIntyre final eight system, which was previously used by the AFL, and was used by the National Rugby League until 2012.

The top four teams in the eight receive what is popularly known as the "double chance" when they play in week-one qualifying finals; this means that if a top-four team loses in the first week, it still has a chance to redeem itself by getting a chance to play in a semi-final the next week against the winner of an elimination final. The bottom four of the eight are forced to play what are called elimination finals, in which only the winners survive and move on to week two to play the losers of the qualifying finals.

In the second week, the winners of the qualifying finals receive a bye to the third week, while the losers of those qualifying finals must play the winners of the elimination finals for a chance to play the qualifying finals winners. Home-ground advantage goes to the team with the higher seed.

In the third week, the winners of the semi-finals from week two play the winners of the qualifying finals in the first week, with the latter receiving home-ground advantage. The winners of those matches move on to the Grand Final at the Melbourne Cricket Ground in Melbourne, where the new premier will be crowned.

The favourites for the 2005 Grand Final were Adelaide, St Kilda, Sydney and West Coast.

== Week One ==
=== First Qualifying Final (1 vs 4) ===
==== Scorecard ====
Team	1	2	3	4	Total
(1) Adelaide	3.3	3.5	5.7	8.9	8.9 (57)
(4) St Kilda	1.0	6.3	9.3	10.5	10.5 (65)
St Kilda won by 8	G.B	G.B	G.B	G.B	Final

Team stats	Ade	StK
Kicks	186	214
Marks	73	102
Handballs	113	129
Tackles	61	61
Hitouts	47	22
Frees	14	17

Date	Saturday, 3 September 2005 7PM ACST
Goals (Ade)	4: K McGregor; 1: R Shirley, G Johncock, S Welsh, S Goodwin
Goals (StK)	3: R Harvey; 2: N Riewoldt, J Gwilt; 1: L Ball, J Blake, S Milne
Best	Ade: Rutten, Bassett, Goodwin, McGregor, Edwards, McLeod, Johncock; StK: Harvey, Dal Santo, Hayes, Jones; Fisher, Ball, Peckett
Injuries	None
Reports	None
Venue	AAMI Stadium, Adelaide, SA
Attendance	48,768
Umpires	Michael Vozzo, Stephen McBurney, Shaun Ryan

=== Second Qualifying Final (2 vs 3) ===
==== Scorecard ====
Team	1	2	3	4	Total
(2) West Coast	4.1	5.4	5.7	10.9	10.9 (69)
(3) Sydney	3.1	5.2	8.3	10.5	10.5 (65)
West Coast won by 4	G.B	G.B	G.B	G.B	Final

Team stats	WCE	Syd
Kicks	181	180
Marks	62	63
Handballs	110	101
Tackles	46	52
Hitouts	45	42
Free Kicks	21	14

Date	Friday, 2 September 2005 6:30PM AWST
Goals (WCE)	2: M Gardiner, A Hunter, A Sampi; 1: A Hansen, D Kerr, T Stenglein, M Seaby
Goals (Syd)	3: N Davis, M O'Loughlin; 2: B Hall; 1: R O'Keefe, A Schneider
Best	WCE: Kerr, Judd, Cousins, Hunter, Nicoski, Wirrpanda; Syd: Kirk, Davis, C Bolton, Buchanan, Goodes, O'Loughlin, Kennelly, Williams
Injuries	WCE: P Matera (hip); Syd: Williams (ankle)
Reports	None
Venue	Subiaco Oval, Perth, WA
Attendance	43,302
Umpires	Scott McLaren, Derek Woodcock, Shane McInerney

Sydney entered the game as the in form team of the competition. West Coast topped the ladder most of the season, and were only denied the minor premiership on percentage. The Eagles led the game most of the first half, but the Swans appeared to be marching onward to victory by taking control of the third quarter. In a foreshadowing of things to come, West Coast responded by taking control of the fourth quarter. Two controversial fourth quarter umpiring decisions against Sydney hurt their cause. Even more damaging were two late marks in defence by Eagle Dean Cox snubbing Swan attempts to kick a game winner.

=== First Elimination Final (5 vs 8) ===
==== Scorecard ====
Team	1	2	3	4	Total
(5) Kangaroos	6.6	7.7	10.9	11.11	11.11 (77)
(8) Port Adelaide	6.1	12.3	20.6	26.8	26.8 (164)
Port Adelaide won by 87	G.B	G.B	G.B	G.B	Final

Team stats	Kan	PA
Kicks	166	223
Marks	69	126
Handballs	87	128
Tackles	46	31
Hitouts	28	40
Frees	16	15

Date	Sunday, 4 September 2005 2:30PM AEST
Goals (Kan)	3: C Jones; 2: N Thompson, S Rocca; 1: L Picoane, B Rawlings, D Wells, L Harding
Goals (PA)	4: B Lade, W Tredrea, J Mahoney; 3: M Pettigrew; 2: A Kingsley, D Brogan; 1: M Bishop, C Cornes, S Dew, B Montgomery, D Pearce, S Salopek, G Wanganeen
Best	Kan: Sinclair, Jones, Wells, Harris; PA: Tredrea, Kingsley, Lade, Pettigrew, Mahoney, Montgomery, C. Cornes
Injuries	None
Reports	None
Venue	Telstra Dome, Melbourne, VIC
Attendance	25,195
Umpires	Hayden Kennedy, Brett Allen, Scott Jeffery

=== Second Elimination Final (6 vs 7) ===
==== Scorecard ====
Team	1	2	3	4	Total
(6) Geelong	5.4	12.5	16.8	18.8	18.8 (116)
(7) Melbourne	2.3	6.4	6.6	9.7	9.7 (61)
Geelong won by 55	G.B	G.B	G.B	G.B	Final

Team stats	Geel	Melb
Kicks	242	162
Marks	136	79
Handballs	111	106
Tackles	41	54
Hitouts	31	27
Frees	19	21

Date	Saturday, 3 September 2005 2:30PM AEST
Goals (Geel)	3: G Ablett, J Kelly; 2: C Ling, A Mackie, C Mooney, H Playfair; 1: N Ablett, S Johnson, K Kingsley, K Tenace
Goals (Melb)	4: R Robertson; 2: P Wheatley; 1: A Davey, B Holland, A Yze
Best	Geel: Mooney, Milburn, Corey, Bartel, Ling, Rooke, G. Ablett; Melb: Carroll, Brown, Moloney, Robertson
Injuries	Geel: None; Melb: White (face), Rigoni (concussion), Johnstone (ankle), Wheatley (adductor), McDonald (calf)
Reports	Geel: Johnson for rough conduct against Holland
Venue	Melbourne Cricket Ground, Melbourne, VIC
Attendance	65,018
Umpires	Justin Schmitt, Stuart Wenn, Darren Goldspink

== Week Two ==
=== First Semi-final ===
==== Scorecard ====
Team	1	2	3	4	Total
(1) Adelaide	3.4	4.7	12.9	18.15	18.15 (123)
(8) Port Adelaide	2.1	3.6	4.6	5.10	5.10 (40)
Adelaide won by 83	G.B	G.B	G.B	G.B	Final

Team stats	Ade	PA
Kicks	188	161
Marks	105	80
Handballs	118	117
Tackles	48	43
Hitouts	32	30
Frees	17	20

Date	Saturday, 10 September 2005 7PM ACST
Goals (Ade)	4: S Welsh; 3: S Goodwin, I Perrie; 2: K McGregor; 1: T Edwards, T Hentschel, A McLoed, M Ricciuto, B Rutten, R Shirley
Goals (PA)	1: S Burgoyne, J Mahoney, D Pearce, M Pettigrew, G Wanganeen
Best	Ade: Edwards, Goodwin, Ricciuto, Clarke, Rutten, Bassett, Burton, McLeod; PA: C. Cornes, K. Cornes, Montgomery, Wakelin
Injuries	Ade: Johncock (calf), Biglands, Shirley (head knock); PA: Wilson (hamstring)
Reports	None
Venue	AAMI Stadium, Adelaide, SA
Attendance	50,521
Umpires	Michael Vozzo, Brett Allen, Scott McLaren

=== Second Semi-final ===
==== Scorecard ====
Team	1	2	3	4	Total
(3) Sydney	2.2	2.6	3.12	7.14	7.14 (56)
(6) Geelong	2.6	5.8	6.11	7.11	7.11 (53)
Sydney won by 3	G.B	G.B	G.B	G.B	Final

Team stats	Syd	Geel
Kicks	155	177
Marks	50	79
Handballs	111	93
Tackles	66	83
Hitouts	66	22
Frees	16	17

Date	Friday, 9 September 2005 8PM AEST
Goals (Syd)	4: N Davis; 2: M O'Loughlin; 1: R O'Keefe
Goals (Geel)	2: S Johnson; 1: C Gardiner, J Kelly, H Playfair, J Rooke, D Johnson
Best	Syd: Davis, Crouch, Kirk, Buchanan, Bolton; Geel: Kelly, Scarlett, Johnson, Ling, Corey, Sanderson
Injuries	Syd: Williams (thigh); Geel: King (hamstring)
Reports	None
Venue	Sydney Cricket Ground, Sydney, NSW
Attendance	39,079
Umpires	Stuart Wenn, Shaun Ryan, Darren Goldspink

A thrilling victory for Sydney, and a heartbreaking loss for Geelong. The game seemed decided, with Geelong ahead by 23 points early in the final quarter - Sydney needed four goals to win, and had kicked only three for the night. But the Swans did come back, with Nick Davis kicking all four of the final quarter goals, including the game-winner with less than ten seconds remaining.

== Week Three ==
=== First Preliminary Final ===
==== Scorecard ====
Team	1	2	3	4	Total
(4) St Kilda	3.1	5.5	9.7	9.11	9.11 (65)
(3) Sydney	5.1	6.3	8.6	15.6	15.6 (96)
Sydney won by 31	G.B	G.B	G.B	G.B	Final

Team stats	StK	Syd
Kicks	157	196
Marks	65	91
Handballs	98	76
Tackles	64	73
Hitouts	42	37
Frees	19	11

Date	Friday, 16 September 2005 8PM AEST
Goals (StK)	4: F Gehrig; 2: N Riewoldt; 1: L Montagna, N Dal Santo, L Hayes
Goals (Syd)	4: B Hall; 3: A Schneider; 2: M O'Loughlin, P Williams, R O'Keefe; 1: N Davis, A Buchanan
Best	StK: Dal Santo, Harvey, Hudghton, Jones; Gehrig, Baker, Montagna; Syd: O'Keefe, Hall, C. Bolton, J. Bolton, Schneider, Kennelly, Ablett, Crouch,
Injuries	None
Reports	Syd: Hall for striking Maguire
Venue	Melbourne Cricket Ground, Melbourne, VIC
Attendance	73,344
Metropolitan Free To Air TV audience	1.811 million
Umpires	Michael Vozzo, Scott McLaren, Darren Goldspink

Sydney opened the game strongly, but once St. Kilda righted their effort they took the lead and steadily built upon it. Leading by 15 points midway through the third quarter, the Saints were on the verge of putting the game out of reach but they were unable to match Sydney's endurance. In the final quarter the Swans blew the game out of reach by kicking seven un-answered goals.

The Swans' win reversed two heavy losses to the Saints within the past twelve months, the latter of which proved to be a major turning point in their 2005 season.

=== Second Preliminary Final ===
==== Scorecard ====
Team	1	2	3	4	Total
(2) West Coast	2.2	6.5	11.8	14.9	14.9 (93)
(1) Adelaide	2.2	5.4	6.6	11.11	11.11 (77)
West Coast won by 16	G.B	G.B	G.B	G.B	Final

Team stats	WCE	Ade
Kicks	204	184
Marks	91	82
Handballs	142	127
Tackles	52	50
Hitouts	36	31
Frees	15	8

Date	Saturday, 17 September 2005 1PM AWST
Goals (WCE)	3: A Hansen, D Chick; 2: A Embley; 1: M Gardiner, A Sampi, B Cousins, A Selwood, A Hunter, M Seaby
Goals (Ade)	3: K McGregor; 2: T Hentschel, S Welsh; 1: T Edwards, B Burton, I Perrie, S Goodwin
Best	WCE: Kerr, Hunter, Wirrpunda, Embley, Judd, Chick, Selwood, Stenglein; Ade: Edwards, Goodwin, Clarke, Burton, McGregor, Perrie
Injuries	WCE: Braun (leg); Ade: Johncock (calf)
Reports	None
Venue	Subiaco Oval, Perth, WA
Attendance	43,009
Metropolitan Free To Air TV audience	1.490 million
Umpires	Stephen McBurney, Brett Allen, Shaun Ryan

== Grand final ==
Team	1	2	3	4	Total
(3) Sydney	3.0	6.3	6.5	8.10	8.10 (58)
(2) West Coast	2.4	2.7	5.9	7.12	7.12 (54)
Sydney won by 4	G.B	G.B	G.B	G.B	Final

Date	Saturday, 24 September 2005, 2:35pm AEST
Coin Toss Winner	Sydney
Goals (Syd)	2: B Hall; 1: D Jolly, A Schneider, M O'Loughlin, T Kennelly, A Goodes, A Buchanan
Goals (WCE)	2: A Hunter; 1: M Nicoski, D Cox, A Embley, A Hansen, B Cousins
Best	Syd: Roberts-Thomson, Goodes, Buchanan, Kennelly, Fosdike, Kirk; WCE: Judd, Wirrpunda, Cousins, Cox, Fletcher
Norm Smith Medal	C Judd (WCE)
Injuries	Syd: Ball (cut head), C Bolton (nose), Crouch (ankle); WCE: Kerr (ankle), Gardiner (cut head)
Reports	None
Venue	Melbourne Cricket Ground, Melbourne, VIC
Attendance	91,898
Umpires	Scott McLaren, Brett Allen, Darren Goldspink
Metropolitan Free To Air TV audience	3.386 million
