= Mark Thompson (footballer) =

Australian rules footballer, born 1963

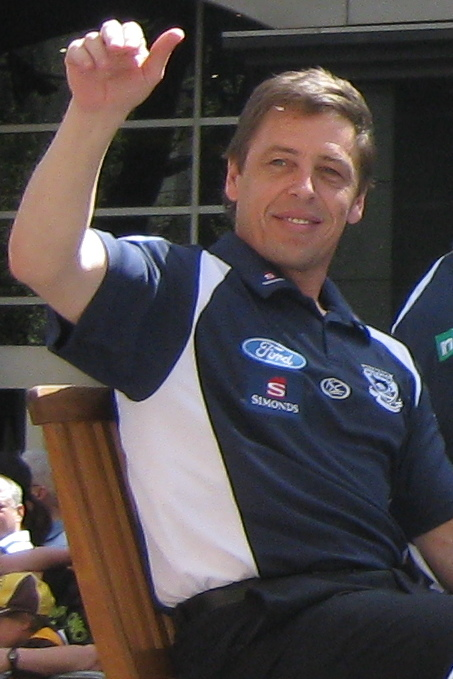
- Thompson at the 2008 AFL Grand Final parade

Personal information
- Full name: Mark Thompson
- Nickname: Bomber
- Born: 19 November 1963 (age 62); Melbourne, Victoria
- Original team: Airport West (EDFL)
- Height: 177 cm (5 ft 10 in)
- Weight: 87 kg (192 lb)
- Position: Defender

Playing career^{1}
Years	Club	Games (Goals)
1983–1996	Essendon	202 (50)

Representative team honours^{2}
Years	Team	Games (Goals)
1986	Victoria	1 (0)

Coaching career
Years	Club	Games (W–L–D)
2000–2010	Geelong	260 (161–96–3)
2014	Essendon	23 (12–10–1)
Total		283 (173–106–4)
- ^{1} Playing statistics correct to the end of 1996.^{2} Representative statistics correct as of 2014.

Career highlights
- Playing: Essendon premiership player: 1984, 1985, 1993 (c); Essendon premiership captain: 1993; Essendon Best & Fairest: 1987, 1990; Essendon captain: 1992–1995; Essendon Team of the Century (www interchange); Coaching: Geelong premiership coach 2007, 2009; AFLCA Coach of the Year: 2007, 2008; All-Australian coach 2007, 2009

Mark "Bomber" Thompson (born 19 November 1963) is a retired Australian rules footballer and former senior coach. He played 202 games for the Essendon Football Club from 1983 to 1996, captaining the side from 1992 until 1995.

After retiring, he was an assistant coach at Essendon and then at North Melbourne before becoming the senior coach of the Geelong Football Club from 2000 to 2010 and coaching them to two premierships. In November 2010, Thompson returned to Essendon as a senior assistant coach and was then appointed the senior coach for the 2014 season. He left the club at the end of 2014.

On 2 May 2018, he was charged with seven counts of drug trafficking and possession. He was released on $20,000 bail to appear in court at a later date. He was later cleared of trafficking but convicted of possession.

== Playing career ==
=== Essendon ===
Thompson played for Essendon Football Club from 1983 until 1996, playing a total number of 202 games and kicked a total of 50 goals. Thompson played most of his football in the backline, gaining a reputation as a fierce competitor. He won the club award for "Most Determined Player" in 1984 and 1986, "Most Improved Player" and "Best Clubman" in 1985, and best-and-fairest awards in 1987 and 1990. He also finished in the top five in the best-and-fairest on four other occasions. Thompson played in the 1984 and 1985 premiership sides and captained the 1993 premiership team. In 2002, Thompson's contribution to the club was recognised when he was voted the 20th best Essendon player of all time in the "Champions of Essendon" list.

== Coaching career ==
=== Essendon Football Club (1996–1998) ===
Thompson was restricted by age and injury to just eight appearances for Essendon during the 1996 AFL season, his last match was the night the lights went out at Waverley Park in round 10. He would take over as coach of the club's reserves team during the season, guiding the club to grand final defeat against North Melbourne.

After Thompson retired as a player, Thompson became an assistant coach at Essendon Football Club under senior coach Kevin Sheedy for the 1997 season and 1998 season.

=== North Melbourne Football Club (1999) ===
In 1999, Thompson joined the North Melbourne Football Club as an assistant coach under senior coach Denis Pagan in what became a premiership year for the Kangaroos in the 1999 season, when North Melbourne defeated Carlton in the 1999 Grand Final to win the premiership.

=== Geelong Football Club (2000–2010) ===
Thompson was appointed as Geelong Football Club senior coach at the end of the 1999 season, for the 2000 season when he replaced Gary Ayres, who quit as Geelong Football Club senior coach. Thompson as Geelong Football Club senior coach was given an extended time to rebuild the club's playing list. Geelong under Thompson finished 5th in the 2000 season in his first season as senior coach but was eliminated by 8th placed Hawthorn in the first week of the finals in the first finals match ever held at the Docklands Stadium. The club under Thompson performed poorly for the next three seasons from 2001 until 2003, missing the top 8 and not making the finals. Thompson's position looked in danger, but in the 2004 season, Geelong under Thompson was a big improver, finishing fourth and making the Preliminary Finals, losing to eventual runners-up Brisbane Lions. Due to his success in reinvigorating the club, Thompson's contract was extended until 2007. The following year in the 2005 season, the club under Thompson finished sixth and was beaten in the Semi-Finals by 3 points against the eventual premiers Sydney Swans after leading for the majority of the match.

In the 2006 season, however the club under Thompson eventually missed the finals after winning the NAB Cup and winning their first two matches in convincing style, leading them into flag favouritism. It was also a season where Thompson had used the 2005 semi-final loss to the Swans as motivation. Following a Round 22 61-point demolition at the hands of lower-placed Hawthorn, Thompson's job was under immense pressure.

After a very public review of the club, it was decided that Thompson should keep his job as senior coach. After a shaky start to the 2007 season that led many supporters to believe that nothing had changed from the 2006 season, Thompson led Geelong to a massive 15 match winning streak (the biggest in a single season in club history) and a 106-point win against the Kangaroos in the Qualifying Final which is the 5th biggest finals winning margin in AFL/VFL history.

The 2007 season then culminated in one of the biggest, if not the best highlight of Thompson's career, in both a coaching and footballer's role. Thompson coached Geelong to win the AFL premiership in the 2007 AFL Grand Final by more than 100 points, which was the highest winning margin in Grand Final history, against Port Adelaide Football Club at the MCG on 29 September. It was the club's first premiership since 1963, the year of Thompson's birth.

After the Essendon Football Club decided not to give Thompson's former mentor, Kevin Sheedy, a renewal of contract, there was speculation that Mark Thompson would take up the senior coaching role at Essendon for the 2008 season. However, with trade week quickly approaching, the club instead appointed Matthew Knights to the position.

After Geelong's record-breaking win in the grand final, Geelong under Thompson were red hot favourite to repeat their 2007 success in the 2008 season and their form during the year did nothing to change that. The Cats went 21–1 to claim the McClelland Trophy four games ahead of their nearest challenger, Hawthorn. After relatively easy wins against St Kilda and the Western Bulldogs in the finals, Geelong under Thompson were into their second straight grand final, this time against Hawthorn, and were again hot favourites. In an upset, though, Hawthorn beat Geelong under Thompson by 26 points in front of 100,012 fans in the 2008 AFL Grand Final.

During an end-of-season holiday to New York that year, Thompson ran into Melbourne Storm coach Craig Bellamy whilst inside a hotel. They were said to have drowned their sorrows following their respective Grand Final losses (Bellamy's Melbourne Storm lost the 2008 NRL Grand Final to Manly).

In the 2009 season, following a heartbreaking loss to Hawthorn in the 2008 Grand Final Premiership decider, Geelong under Thompson compiled an 18–4 record during the minor round and disposed of the Western Bulldogs and then Collingwood during the finals series. On 26 September 2009 in the 2009 AFL Grand Final, Geelong under Thompson faced a St Kilda side determined to break its 43-year Premiership drought. In front of 99,251 fans on a rain-soaked MCG deck, the Cats under Thompson clawed their way back after trailing at every break to win the AFL premiership by 12 points. This would be Geelong's second flag under Thompson in three years cementing their place as one of the great teams of the modern era. Thompson as always was magnanimous in victory and accepted the AFL Premiership trophy alongside Geelong legend Bob Davis.

After Geelong under Thompson were eliminated from the preliminary finals to Collingwood, at the conclusion of the 2010 season, on 4 October 2010, Thompson announced his retirement and resignation as Geelong Football Club senior coach effective immediately, his reason being that he was "tired of coaching" after a decade at the helm. Thompson was replaced by Chris Scott as Geelong Football club senior coach.

=== Return to Essendon Football Club (2010–2014) ===
On 10 November 2010, Thompson signed a lucrative contract to return to Essendon as the senior assistant coach under senior coach James Hird, putting an end to weeks of speculation following his resignation from Geelong. According to football writer and commentator Caroline Wilson's sources, his contract was said to be worth $650,000 per year. He was appointed the senior coach for the 2014 season while James Hird served his suspension, and left the club after Hird returned as senior coach at the end of that year.

== 2013 supplements controversy ==
Following months of rumours and investigations, on 13 August 2013, Thompson, along with the Essendon Football Club, senior coach James Hird, football manager Danny Corcoran and club doctor Bruce Reid, were charged by the AFL with bringing the game into disrepute in relation to the supplements program at the club in 2011 and 2012. The club was given 14 days to consider the charges and faced an AFL Commission hearing on 26 August 2013. On 27 August 2013, Thompson was fined $30,000 for his role in the supplements saga.

== Legal Issues ==
On 2 May 2018, he was charged with seven counts of drug trafficking and possession. He was released on $20,000 bail to appear in court at a later date. He was later cleared of trafficking but convicted of possession.

== Statistics ==
=== Playing statistics ===
Legend
G	Goals	K	Kicks	D	Disposals	T	Tackles
B	Behinds	H	Handballs	M	Marks

Season	Team	No.	Games	Totals							Averages (per game)						
Season	Team	No.	Games	G	B	K	H	D	M	T	G	B	K	H	D	M	T
1983	Essendon	26	2	1	0	22	10	32	3	—N/a	0.5	0.0	11.0	5.0	16.0	1.5	—N/a
1984†	Essendon	26	20	4	3	203	143	346	60	—N/a	0.2	0.2	10.2	7.2	17.3	3.0	—N/a
1985†	Essendon	26	23	5	5	261	188	449	71	—N/a	0.2	0.2	11.3	8.2	19.5	3.1	—N/a
1986	Essendon	26	22	2	3	247	192	439	93	—N/a	0.1	0.1	11.2	8.7	20.0	4.2	—N/a
1987	Essendon	26	18	16	9	217	131	348	75	32	0.9	0.5	12.1	7.3	19.3	4.2	1.8
1988	Essendon	26	0	—	—	—	—	—	—	—	—	—	—	—	—	—	—
1989	Essendon	26	10	0	1	134	76	210	40	10	0.0	0.1	13.4	7.6	21.0	4.0	1.0
1990	Essendon	26	24	7	8	321	198	519	114	28	0.3	0.3	13.4	8.3	21.6	4.8	1.2
1991	Essendon	26	9	6	3	106	58	164	35	9	0.7	0.3	11.8	6.4	18.2	3.9	1.0
1992	Essendon	26	21	5	2	300	169	469	81	22	0.2	0.1	14.3	8.0	22.3	3.9	1.0
1993†	Essendon	26	21	2	0	330	180	510	91	25	0.1	0.0	15.7	8.6	24.3	4.3	1.2
1994	Essendon	26	13	1	1	140	84	224	51	19	0.1	0.1	10.8	6.5	17.2	3.9	1.5
1995	Essendon	26	11	0	2	99	65	164	32	10	0.0	0.2	9.0	5.9	14.9	2.9	0.9
1996	Essendon	26	8	1	1	84	42	126	37	12	0.1	0.1	10.5	5.3	15.8	4.6	1.5
Career			202	50	38	2464	1536	4000	783	167	0.2	0.2	12.2	7.6	19.8	3.9	1.2

== Head coaching record ==
Team	Year	Home and Away Season					Finals			
Team	Year	Won	Lost	Drew	Win %	Finish	Won	Lost	Win %	Result
GEE	2000	12	9	1	.568	5th out of 17	0	1	.000	Lost to Hawthorn in Elimination Final
GEE	2001	9	13	0	.409	12th out of 16	-	-	-	-
GEE	2002	11	11	0	.500	9th out of 16	-	-	-	-
GEE	2003	7	14	1	.547	12th out of 16	-	-	-	-
GEE	2004	15	7	0	.682	4th out of 16	1	2	.334	Lost to Brisbane in Preliminary Final
GEE	2005	12	10	0	.545	6th out of 16	1	1	.500	Lost to Sydney in Semi Final
GEE	2006	10	11	1	.477	10th out of 16	-	-	-	-
GEE	2007	18	4	0	.818	1st out of 16	3	0	1.000	Defeated Port Adelaide in Grand Final
GEE	2008	21	1	0	.955	1st out of 16	2	1	.667	Lost to Hawthorn in Grand Final
GEE	2009	18	4	0	.818	2nd out of 16	3	0	1.000	Defeated St Kilda in Grand Final
GEE	2010	17	5	0	.773	2nd out of 16	1	2	.333	Lost to Collingwood in Preliminary Final
GEE Total		150	89	3	.626		11	7	.611	
ESS	2014	12	9	1	.568	7th out of 18	0	1	.000	Lost to North Melbourne in Elimination Final
ESS Total		12	9	1	.568		0	1	.000	
		162	98	4	.621		11	8	.579	

== Honours and achievements ==
Brownlow Medal votes
Season	Votes
1983	0
1984	0
1985	1
1986	6
1987	4
1988	0
1989	3
1990	3
1991	0
1992	1
1993	5
1994	0
1995	0
1996	0
Total	23

=== Playing honours ===
Team

- VFL/AFL Premiership (Essendon): 1984, 1985, 1993 (C)
- McClelland Trophy (Essendon): 1984, 1985, 1990, 1993 (C)
- AFL Pre-Season Cup (Essendon): 1993 (C)
- Night Series Winner (Essendon): 1984

Individual

- W. S. Crichton Medal (Essendon F.C. B&F): 1987, 1990
- Essendon F.C. Best Clubman Award: 1985
- Essendon F.C. Most Determined Player Award: 1984, 1986
- Essendon F.C. Most Improved Player Award: 1985
- State of Origin Representative Honours: 1986
- Essendon F.C. Captain: 1992–1995
- Essendon F.C. Team of the Century – Back Pocket
- Champions of Essendon – 20th

=== Coaching honours ===
Team

- VFL/AFL Premiership (Geelong): 2007, 2009
- McClelland Trophy (Geelong): 2007, 2008
- Pre-Season Cup (Geelong): 2006, 2009

Individual:

- Jock McHale Medal: 2007, 2009
- All-Australian: 2007, 2009
- AFLCA Coach of the Year Award: 2007, 2008
- Victorian Coach for AFL Hall of Fame Tribute Match: 2008
