= Craig Davis (Australian footballer) =

Australian rules footballer

Personal information
- Born: 2 October 1954 (age 72); Ross, Tasmania
- Original team: Launceston (NTFA)
- Height: 183 cm (72 in)
- Weight: 81 kg (179 lb)

Playing career^{1}
Years	Club	Games (Goals)
1973–1975	Carlton	42 (72)
1977–1978	North Melbourne	10 (20)
1979–1983	Collingwood	102 (251)
1988	Sydney Swans	9 (17)
Total		163 (360)
- ^{1} Playing statistics correct to the end of 1988.

Career highlights
- Leading Carlton goalkicker 1974; Leading Collingwood goalkicker 1979, 1980

Craig Davis (born 2 October 1954) is a former Australian rules footballer who played for the Carlton Football Club, North Melbourne Football Club, Collingwood Football Club and Sydney Swans in the Victorian Football League (VFL).

He played as a full forward and is the father of Nick Davis who is a premiership player with Sydney, and a cousin of Brent Crosswell.

Davis was recruited to the VFL from Launceston and made his debut for Carlton in 1973 at the age of 18. He had played as a wingman and half forward in the reserves team but in just his fifth game for Carlton played at full forward in the 1973 VFL Grand Final. After kicking 72 goals in three seasons he received a head injury during the 1976 pre season. Diagnosed with deformed blood platelets, he didn't play a senior game in the 1976 season.

Despite being warned by the Carlton doctors over the danger of another head injury he joined North Melbourne during the 1977 season. He remained with the club until the end of 1978 but after managing only a total of 10 games he moved, this time to Collingwood. He kicked 88 goals in his debut season at Collingwood, topping the club's goalkicking charts for the year and falling 3 goals short of the Coleman Medal which was won by Kelvin Templeton. For the next two seasons he finished with over 50 goals and by the time he left the club in 1983 he had kicked a total of 251 goals.

In 1988 at the age of 33 he made a surprise comeback to football, playing a season in Sydney with the Swans after being a development coach and team runner for the previous few years.

Following his playing career, Craig Davis has remained active in football as an administrator with the NSW AFL.
