= Ashley Hansen =

Australian rules footballer, born 1983

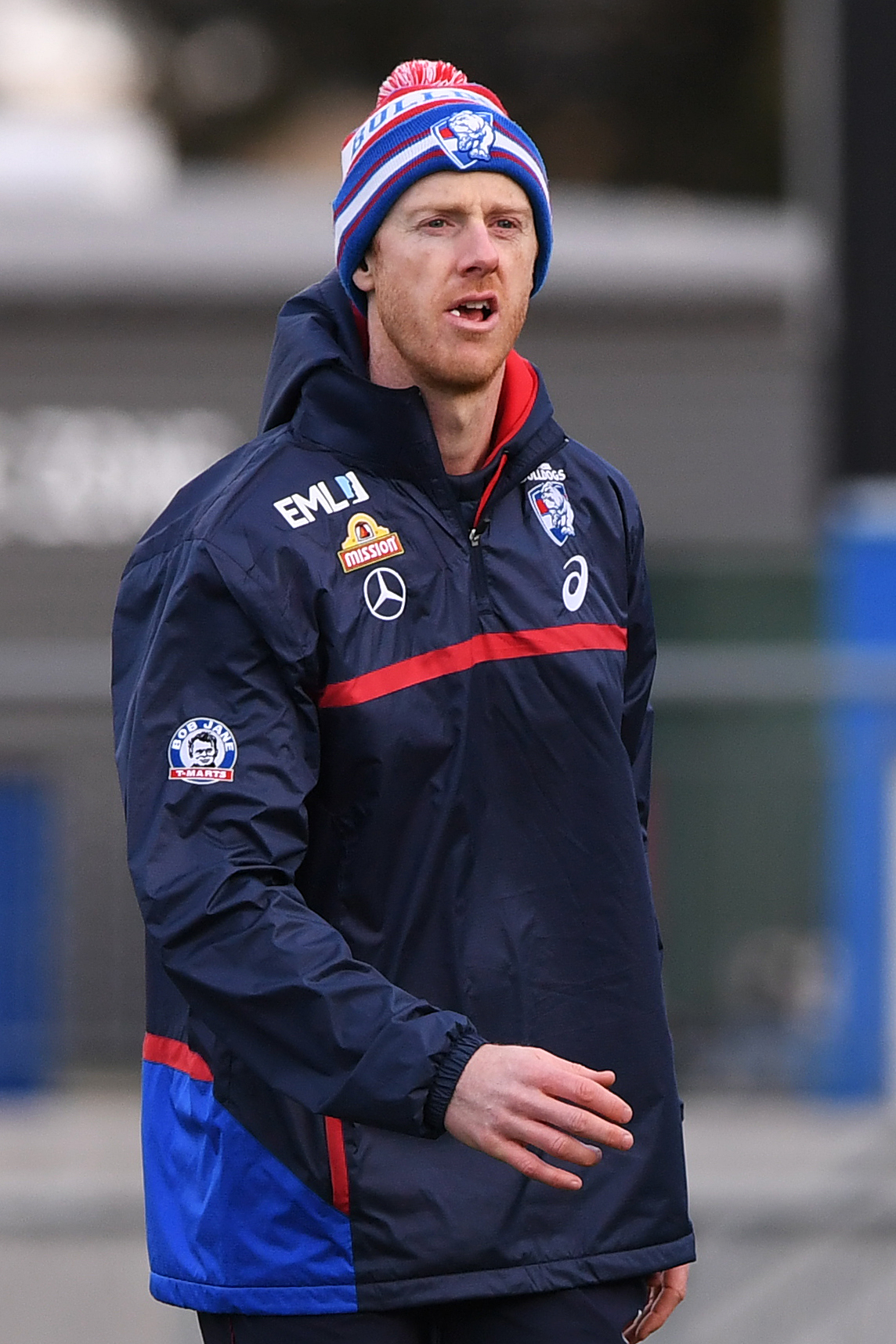
- Hansen in August 2018

Personal information
- Born: 3 March 1983 (age 43)
- Original team: Oakleigh Chargers
- Debut: 4 June 2004, West Coast Eagles vs. Collingwood, at Telstra Dome
- Height: 198 cm (6 ft 6 in)
- Weight: 95 kg (209 lb)

Playing career^{1}
Years	Club	Games (Goals)
2004–2010	West Coast Eagles	78 (95)

Coaching career^{3}
Years	Club	Games (W–L–D)
2015–2016	Footscray (VFL)	20 (12–8–0)
2022	Carlton	1 (1–0–0)
- ^{1} Playing statistics correct to the end of 2010.^{3} Coaching statistics correct as of 2015.

Career highlights
- AFL Premiership Player: 2006; VFL Premiership Coach: 2016; WAFL Premiership Player: 2010; Swan Districts Leading Goal Kicker: 2002, 2003, 2012

Ashley Hansen (born 3 March 1983) is a former Australian Rules footballer. He played for the West Coast Eagles in the Australian Football League (AFL)

== Playing career ==
=== West Coast Eagles ===
Hansen was born in Victoria, Australia and was educated at Mazenod College. His father, Clarke Hansen, was a respected sports commentator. Recruited from Northvale/Oakleigh Chargers, he made his debut for West Coast Eagles in round 11, 2004, against Collingwood, after being picked with selection 38 in the 2001 AFL draft. Hansen was named the Eagles' rookie of the year for 2005.

Of the 14 games Hansen played during the 2006 season, the Eagles emerged victorious on every occasion. Hansen kicked two goals in the opening quarter of the 2006 AFL Grand Final, which the West Coast Eagles won by a solitary point.

In round 7, 2007, Hansen appeared in a losing side for the first time since the 2005 AFL Grand Final.

Hansen struggled with injuries during the latter half of his career, playing 14 games or less in each of his final four seasons, with only nine in 2009. His name was often brought up during the trade period, however he remained with the Eagles, concluding his career as a one club player. Hansen was delisted at the end of the 2010 season, but continued playing at WAFL level with Swan Districts, where he had played reserves while a West Coast listed player. Hansen played with Swan Districts until 2012, and was part of its 2010 premiership team.

== Coaching career ==
=== Western Bulldogs ===
Hansen joined the Western Bulldogs in 2013. Over nine years with the club, he served a variety of assistant coaching roles, including as coach of its reserves team in the Victorian Football League for three seasons, during which time he led the team to the 2016 premiership.

=== Carlton Football Club ===
In October 2021, Hansen signed as forwards assistant coach at Carlton under senior coach Michael Voss for the 2022 season. In the 2022 season in Round 2, 2022, against the Western Bulldogs, Hansen filled in as caretaker interim senior coach in the absence of regular senior coach Michael Voss who tested positive for COVID-19. Carlton won the game by margin of twelve points under Hansen as stand-in senior coach for Voss.

== Statistics ==
Legend
G	Goals	K	Kicks	D	Disposals	T	Tackles
B	Behinds	H	Handballs	M	Marks

Season	Team	No.	Games	Totals							Averages (per game)						
Season	Team	No.	Games	G	B	K	H	D	M	T	G	B	K	H	D	M	T
2004	West Coast	29	6	7	5	38	8	46	18	6	1.2	0.8	6.3	1.3	7.7	3.0	1.0
2005	West Coast	29	20	24	16	163	76	239	114	27	1.2	0.8	8.2	3.8	12.0	5.7	1.4
2006	West Coast	29	14	17	17	124	37	161	101	14	1.2	1.2	8.9	2.6	11.5	7.2	1.0
2007	West Coast	29	14	22	17	107	70	177	97	19	1.6	1.2	7.6	5.0	12.6	6.9	1.4
2008	West Coast	29	13	11	12	109	48	157	82	20	0.8	0.9	8.4	3.7	12.1	6.3	1.5
2009	West Coast	29	9	12	9	71	28	99	43	13	1.3	1.0	7.9	3.1	11.0	4.8	1.4
2010	West Coast	29	2	2	3	22	2	24	13	3	1.0	1.5	11.0	1.0	12.0	6.5	1.5
Career			78	95	79	634	269	903	468	102	1.2	1.0	8.1	3.4	11.6	6.0	1.3
