= Clarke Hansen =

Australian radio broadcaster (1939–2026)

Clarke Hansen (1941 or 1942 – 30 April 2026) was an Australian radio broadcaster.

Hansen was a sports broadcaster of Australian rules football and many other sporting events, including Olympic Games and tennis for ABC radio between 1967 and 1997. He is a member of the Melbourne Cricket Ground Media Hall of Fame.

He was also the father of Australian rules footballer Ashley, who played for the West Coast Eagles. Clarke Hansen was one of the original News Readers on NRN Channel 10 (now changed to NRN 11) Coffs Harbour when it commenced broadcasting in January 1965. Four years later he moved to Victoria to take up a job with the A.B.C. Hansen died on 30 April 2026, at the age of 84.
