= Nick Davis (footballer) =

Australian rules footballer (born 1980)

Personal information
- Full name: Nick Davis
- Born: 30 March 1980 (age 46); Melbourne, Victoria
- Original teams: St George (SFL), NSW-ACT U18
- Draft: 19th overall, 1998; Collingwood (Father–son selection)
- Height: 184 cm (6 ft 0 in)
- Weight: 81 kg (179 lb)
- Position: Forward

Playing career^{1}
Years	Club	Games (Goals)
1999–2002	Collingwood	71 (85)
2003–2008	Sydney Swans	97 (150)
Total		168 (235)
- ^{1} Playing statistics correct to the end of 2008.

Career highlights
- AFL premiership player: 2005; AFL Rising Star nominee: 1999

Nick Davis (born 30 March 1980) is a former professional Australian rules footballer born to Father Craig Davis (Australian footballer), Former Collingwood Football Club's star player and Mother Judith Davis. Nick started his career with Collingwood Football Club same club as his father where he was first drafted in 1998 and later played for Sydney Swans in the Australian Football League (AFL).

== Early life ==
Born in Melbourne, Davis moved to Sydney at the age of four, where he played rugby league as a schoolboy before becoming involved in Australian rules football.

== AFL career ==
=== Collingwood ===
Davis was drafted by Collingwood, the club where his father Craig played 102 of his 163 VFL/AFL games, with a father–son pick in the 1998 AFL draft.

At the end of his initial two-year contract, Davis re-signed with Collingwood and kicked 36 goals in 21 games in 2001. In 2002, he played in Collingwood's Grand Final team.

=== Sydney ===
Following the 2002 season, Davis was traded to the Sydney Swans. In the 2003 season, he kicked 32 goals in 24 appearances. In 2004, he had an injury-riddled season.

==== 2005 season ====
Siren could go any second. Swans need a goal...Nick Davis! Nick Davis! I don't believe it! I see it, but I don't believe it! Class with a capital C – four goals from Nick Davis! He has singlehandedly sent them into a preliminary final!

— Anthony Hudson's TV call of Davis's fourth and match-winning goal on Network Ten

Final play of the season, ball at the top of the goal square – Nick Davis! Nick Davis! Davis has done it for Sydney! It's grand larceny! It's highway robbery! It's Ronnie Biggs! It's Ned Kelly! It's the greatest thieving effort you will ever see!

— Clinton Grybas's radio call of Davis's match-winning goal on 3AW

Despite a three-week stint on the sidelines with a hamstring strain mid-year, including missing the season-turning 43-point defeat to St Kilda after which he was recalled to the side, Davis's form continually improved throughout 2005.

Davis is best remembered for his performance in the final quarter of the 2005 second semi-final between Sydney and Geelong. In a low-scoring game at the Sydney Cricket Ground, Sydney trailed 3.12 (30) to 6.11 (47) at three-quarter time, which increased to a 23-point margin after Davis's direct opponent, David Johnson, kicked the opening goal of the final quarter. Davis then recovered to kick the last four goals of the game, delivering Sydney a three-point victory, 7.14 (56) d. 7.11 (53). His first three goals came from two difficult snaps and a set-shot, and the last came from a stoppage in the final five seconds of the game. The ball-up twenty metres from the Swans' goal was tapped to a running Davis by ruckman Jason Ball. Davis did not have time to take a clean possession, and on the wrong side of the goal for a right-footed player of his nature. Davis juggled the ball before snapping a shot with his left foot, kicking a goal to put Sydney ahead with just three seconds remaining. It is considered one of the greatest individual quarters of football ever played.

The Swans went on to win the preliminary final against St Kilda and then the following week won the 2005 Grand Final against West Coast to end a 72-year club premiership drought.

==== 2006 season ====
In round 14 of 2006, after the Swans had played Adelaide at the SCG, Davis was dropped from the seniors and sent to the reserves. This proved to be a major challenge. After an outcry to the media, coach Paul Roos was furious and kept him playing in the reserves for 6 weeks. However, he came back in round 21 and played all the remaining games of the season, including the 2006 Grand Final, where he was one of Sydney's best, kicking 3 goals.

==== 2008 season ====
Davis played only three games for the Swans in 2008, after being dropped for a period and then being brought back in to cover during Barry Hall's seven-match suspension for striking Brent Staker. He played in the controversial draw against North Melbourne, when Sydney had an extra man on the field for 90 seconds near the end of the game, before again being dropped. He did not play another game for the Swans for the year due to dislocating his kneecap and requiring surgery, and he was not offered another contract at the end of the season.

Davis flagged an interest in moving to Perth to play for the West Coast Eagles when he came out of contract at the end of the 2008 season. He was delisted at the end of the year and was not selected in the 2008 AFL draft.

== Post-AFL career ==
He attempted to convert sports to become a punter in the NFL, but was not signed by any team.

In 2012, Davis became a runner for the Sydney Swans and was also employed as a marking and kicking coach for the Cronulla Sharks. He then moved to the Sydney Roosters to be their kicking coach.

In 2020, the Sydney Roosters announced they had signed him for the NRL Nines. Davis's press conference announcing the signing was attended by both Roosters head coach Trent Robinson and Swans head coach John Longmire. Davis ended up playing one game for the tournament, converting one goal kick in the Roosters 14-8 pool stage win over the Warriors.

Davis served as the Sydney Roosters' specialist kicking, catching and skills coach from 2019 to 2025. He was appointed the club’s full-time Skills Coach in November 2025. Lebanon also employed him as a kicking coach for their 2026 Rugby League World Cup campaign.

== Statistics ==
Legend
G	Goals	K	Kicks	D	Disposals	T	Tackles
B	Behinds	H	Handballs	M	Marks

Season	Team	No.	Games	Totals							Averages (per game)						
Season	Team	No.	Games	G	B	K	H	D	M	T	G	B	K	H	D	M	T
1999	Collingwood	19	16	5	9	117	54	171	43	9	0.3	0.6	7.3	3.4	10.7	2.7	0.6
2000	Collingwood	19	14	13	8	142	69	211	76	10	0.9	0.6	10.1	4.9	15.1	5.4	0.7
2001	Collingwood	19	21	36	15	242	100	342	115	27	1.7	0.7	11.5	4.8	16.3	5.5	1.3
2002	Collingwood	19	20	31	22	156	39	195	84	15	1.6	1.1	7.8	2.0	9.8	4.2	0.8
2003	Sydney	2	24	32	19	211	105	316	91	35	1.3	0.8	8.8	4.4	13.2	3.8	1.5
2004	Sydney	2	12	21	7	67	37	104	34	9	1.8	0.6	5.6	3.1	8.7	2.8	0.8
2005	Sydney	2	23	38	21	210	89	299	95	29	1.7	0.9	9.1	3.9	13.0	4.1	1.3
2006	Sydney	2	17	23	18	160	74	234	92	34	1.4	1.1	9.4	4.4	13.8	5.4	2.0
2007	Sydney	2	18	33	12	139	73	212	69	23	1.8	0.7	7.7	4.1	11.8	3.8	1.3
2008	Sydney	2	3	3	4	21	12	33	15	4	1.0	1.3	7.0	4.0	11.0	5.0	1.3
Career			168	235	135	1465	652	2117	714	195	1.4	0.8	8.7	3.9	12.6	4.3	1.2
