= Ken McGregor (footballer) =

Australian rules footballer

Personal information
- Full name: Ken McGregor
- Born: 29 January 1981 (age 45)
- Original team: Woodville-West Torrens (SANFL)
- Draft: No. 75, 1998 National Draft, Adelaide
- Height: 195 cm (6 ft 5 in)
- Weight: 96 kg (212 lb)

Playing career^{1}
Years	Club	Games (Goals)
1999–2008	Adelaide	152 (114)

Coaching career
Years	Club	Games (W–L–D)
2013	Port Adelaide (SANFL)	20 (8–12–0)
2014–2015	North Adelaide (SANFL)	26 (10–16–0)
- ^{1} Playing statistics correct to the end of 2014.

Career highlights
- Pre-season premiership player 2003

Ken McGregor (born 29 January 1981) is a former Australian rules footballer who played for Adelaide in the Australian Football League (AFL). He was drafted at pick 75 in the 1998 AFL draft. After retiring from professional football he spent some time as a political journalist for the Adelaide Advertiser before moving to Canberra. He also played football for Ainslie in the North East Australian Football League (NEAFL). He was the coach of the Port Adelaide in the South Australian National Football League (SANFL) in 2013 and coached fellow SANFL club North Adelaide in 2014 and until his contract was terminated after round 9 of the 2015 season.

== Career ==
=== Early career (1999–2001) ===
Debuting as an 18-year-old for the Adelaide Crows, McGregor played a few solid games in his first season. He picked up 18 disposals in his first game, as well as 6 marks and a goal. He then went on after a few more solid performances to play the rest of the season. He averaged 8 disposals a game for the season, as well as an aggregate of 5 goals.

For the next couple of seasons, McGregor struggled to find his spot in the Adelaide team. He played 14 games in 2000, averaging 10 disposals. But, he was inaccurate, kicking 9 goals, 15 behinds. In the 2001 season, McGregor found his way into the Crows backline, played 12 games. He had lower stats then his last season, averaging just 9 disposals, and kicking 3 goals for the season.

=== 2002–2003 seasons ===
McGregor did not play the first 5 games of the season, but came back for the Crows sixth against Richmond. He still came into the match with an injury, and failed to pick up any touches. When he returned, he played mainly down back, but sometimes when a match-up wasn't there for him, he drifted forward as another big forward. He averaged 12 disposals for the season, kicking 5 goals, including 2 in a semi-final against Melbourne.

In 2003, McGregor found himself changing roles between back and forward again. He missed out on just two games for the season, including their first final. In all, he played 22 games for the year, having 12 disposals and 4 marks a game. He also kicked 6 goals for the year.

=== 2004–2005 seasons ===
When Neil Craig took over as coach of the Adelaide Football Club, McGregor has started to play some of his best footy. He only missed out on the last 3 games of the 2004 season due to injury. During 2004 he was described by Brisbane Lions star forward and enforcer Jonathan Brown as the toughest opponent he'd ever had to play on. He was pushed forward earlier in the year by Gary Ayers, proving his prowess by kicking 5 goals in a game against Richmond. He averaged 13 disposals a match, and kicked 12 goals.

He continued his good form into the next year, missing out on just one game of the year. He played his first seven games down back, before Neil Craig shifted him into the underscoring forward line. It proved to be a great move by the new coach, as McGregor went on to kick 31 goals for the season.

During the 2005 preliminary final against the West Coast Eagles. McGregor was the victim of an elbow from Travis Gaspar, just before the bouncedown. This resulted in a 50-metre penalty and Adelaide kicking the first goal. Gasper was charged with striking, but found not guilty due to it being deemed an act of self-defence.

=== 2006–2008 seasons ===
2006 was a solid year for McGregor. He played in 19 games for the year, kicking 21 goals.

McGregor only played nine games in 2007, leading him to request to be traded to another club at the end of the season. He was retained on the list, and continued to play in 2008. However, despite being contracted for 2009, he retired at the end of the 2008 season, having played only seven games.

== Career AFL stats ==
- Games – 152
- Disposals – 1687
- Av Disp per game – 11.1
- Goals/Behinds – 114/79
- Accuracy – 69.3%
