= 2006 NAB Cup =

- Season: 2006
- Teams: 16
- Winners: Geelong (1st title)
- Matches played: 15
- Attendance: 232,617 (average 15,508 per match)
- Michael Tuck Medallist: Simon Goodwin (Adelaide)

The 2006 NAB Cup was held across Australia between 24 February and 18 March. The NAB Cup was won by Geelong who defeated Adelaide by 8 points in the Grand Final of the knock-out pre-season competition.

== Prize money ==
- Winner: $220,000
- Runner-up: $110,000
- Round 3 losers: $55,000
- Round 2 losers: $27,000
- Round 1 losers: $16,500

$220,000 was awarded to the winning club (by comparison, the prize money for the winner of the 2005 AFL Grand Final was only slightly larger at $250,000). Smaller amounts were awarded to clubs based on participation and progression through the competition.

== Games ==
=== Round 1 ===
	Round 1
Friday, 24 February (7:40 pm)	Brisbane Lions 1.8.13 (70)	def.	Essendon 1.8.12 (69)	Carrara Stadium (crowd: 13,269)
Friday, 24 February (8:10 pm)	Western Bulldogs 1.7.12 (63)	def. by	Melbourne 0.9.15 (69)	Marrara Oval (crowd: 6,000)
Saturday, 25 February (2:10 pm)	Kangaroos 1.8.11 (68)	def.	Sydney 0.5.7 (37)	Manuka Oval (crowd: 5,336)
Saturday, 25 February (4:10 pm)	Hawthorn 1.11.10 (85)	def.	Richmond 0.11.9 (75)	Telstra Dome (crowd: 15,649)
Saturday, 25 February (7:40 pm)	Carlton 1.8.13 (70)	def. by	Geelong 0.15.8 (98)	Telstra Dome (crowd: 15,649)
Sunday, 26 February (1:40 pm)	Adelaide 2.16.13 (127)	def.	Port Adelaide 0.8.7 (55)	AAMI Stadium (crowd: 17,012)
Sunday, 26 February (4:40 pm)	Collingwood 2.8.8 (74)	def.	St Kilda 1.9.10 (73)	Telstra Dome (crowd: 24,567)
Sunday, 26 February (4:10 pm)	West Coast 1.7.14 (65)	def. by	Fremantle 1.18.10 (127)	Subiaco Oval (crowd: 36,686)

=== Round 2 ===
	Round 2
Friday, 3 March (7:40 pm)	Brisbane Lions 0.12.9 (81)	def. by	Melbourne 0.13.12 (90)	Telstra Dome (crowd: 11,612)
Saturday, 4 March (6:40 pm)	Hawthorn 1.7.7 (58)	def. by	Adelaide 2.7.11 (71)	Aurora Stadium (crowd: 8,060)
Saturday, 4 March (7:45 pm)	Kangaroos 1.8.3 (60)	def. by	Geelong 1.10.17 (86)	Cazalys Stadium (crowd: 7,824)
Sunday, 5 March (4:10 pm)	Fremantle 0.15.10 (100)	def.	Collingwood 2.10.6 (84)	Subiaco Oval (crowd: 15,610)

=== Round 3 ===
	Round 3
Friday, 10 March (7:10 pm)	Adelaide 1.16.21 (129)	def.	Melbourne 1.5.5 (44)	AAMI Stadium (crowd: 12,594)
Saturday, 11 March (7:40 pm)	Geelong 3.10.14 (101)	def.	Fremantle 1.10.12 (81)	Telstra Dome (crowd: 12,042)

=== Grand Final ===
2006 NAB Cup Grand Final
Saturday, 18 March (7:10 pm)	Adelaide	def. by	Geelong	AAMI Stadium (crowd: 30,707)
0.4.5 (29); 0.5.10 (40); 1.8.14 (71); 1.10.15 (84)	Q1; Q2; Q3; Final	0.1.1 (7); 0.5.3 (33); 2.6.4 (58); 3.10.5 (92)	Michael Tuck Medal: Simon Goodwin (Adelaide); Television broadcast: Network 10
Vince	Super Goals	Hunt, Ablett, Corey
Bode 3, Perrie 2, Hentschel, Burton, Knights, Vince, Goodwin	Goals	Mooney 3, Chapman 2, Ablett, Kelly, Rooke, Playfair, Byrnes
Goodwin, Thompson, Burton, Massie, Knights, McLeod	Best	Enright, Bartel, Chapman, Kelly, Mooney, Corey, Scarlett
Injuries	Josh Hunt (knee)
Nil	Reports	The MRP cited Slade (Gee) with a Level Two offence for striking Burton (Ade) during Q3. Slade accepted a reprimand offered by the MRP and 93.75 points to his future record.
Geelong ended a 43 year premiership drought in all AFL senior men's competitions by winning the NAB Cup.

== Results ==
Round 1
Brisbane Lions	70
Essendon	69
Western Bulldogs	63
Melbourne	69
Hawthorn	85
Richmond	75
Adelaide	127
Port Adelaide	55
Kangaroos	68
Sydney	37
Carlton	70
Geelong	98
Collingwood	74
St Kilda	73
West Coast	65
Fremantle	127

Round 2
Brisbane Lions	81
Melbourne	90
Hawthorn	58
Adelaide	71
Kangaroos	60
Geelong	86
Collingwood	84
Fremantle	100

Round 3
Melbourne	44
Adelaide	129
Geelong	101
Fremantle	81

Grand Final
Adelaide	84
Geelong	92

== NAB Challenge ==
	Practice match
Friday, 17 February (7:00pm)	Sydney 10.11 (71)	def. by	Essendon 13.11 (89)	North Sydney Oval (crowd: 8,461)

	Week 1
Friday, 3 March (4:00pm)	Essendon 12.13 (85)	def.	Sydney 8.5 (53)	Optus Oval (crowd: 2,000 est.)
Saturday, 4 March (1:30pm)	Carlton 5.9 (39)	def. by	Port Adelaide 20.18 (138)	Optus Oval (crowd: 4,000 est.)
Saturday, 4 March (2:00pm)	Richmond 26.18 (174)	def.	Western Bulldogs 15.6 (96)	Deakin Reserve, Shepparton (crowd: 4,500 est.)
Saturday, 4 March (3:45pm)	West Coast 12.12 (84)	def.	St Kilda 11.10 (76)	Rushton Park, Mandurah (crowd: 8,283)

	Week 2
Friday, 10 March (4:00pm)	St Kilda 12.10 (82)	def. by	Western Bulldogs 13.15 (93)	Optus Oval (crowd: 3,500 est.)
Friday, 10 March (7:00pm)	Essendon 16.13 (109)	def.	Hawthorn 11.6 (72)	Queen Elizabeth Oval, Bendigo (crowd: 11,000 est.)
Friday, 10 March (7:15pm)	Carlton 13.9 (87)	def.	West Coast 9.7 (61)	Traeger Park (crowd: 8,500 est.)
Saturday, 11 March (2:00pm)	Kangaroos 13.9 (87)	def. by	Collingwood 14.8 (92)	Optus Oval (crowd: 4,000 est.)
Saturday, 11 March (2:00pm)	Port Adelaide 17.12 (114)	def.	Brisbane Lions 10.9 (69)	AAMI Stadium (crowd: 3,149)
Saturday, 11 March (7:10pm)	Sydney 7.7 (49)	def. by	Richmond 13.11 (89)	Carrara Stadium (crowd: 6,277)

	Week 3
Friday, 17 March (4:00pm)	Kangaroos 15.9 (99)	def. by	Melbourne 19.7 (121)	Optus Oval (crowd: 1,500 est.)
Friday, 17 March (4:30pm)	Richmond 11.8 (72)	def. by	Essendon 18.15 (123)	Red Cliffs Oval, Mildura (crowd: 10,000 est.)
Friday, 17 March (7:00pm)	Carlton 11.13 (79)	def.	Western Bulldogs 10.16 (76)	Lavington Sports Ground, Albury (crowd: 5,151)
Friday, 17 March (6:00pm)	West Coast 8.7 (55)	def. by	Hawthorn 13.10 (88)	Leederville Oval (crowd: 4,127)
Friday, 17 March (7:00pm)	Fremantle 19.9 (123)	def.	Port Adelaide 9.11 (65)	Fremantle Oval (crowd: 5,000 est.)
Saturday, 18 March (1:45pm)	Sydney 12.19 (91)	def.	St Kilda 11.8 (74)	Newcastle Number 1 Sports Ground (crowd: 3,203)
Saturday, 18 March (7:10pm)	Brisbane Lions 14.15 (99)	def.	Collingwood 12.10 (82)	Carrara Stadium (crowd: 10,117)
The Richmond vs. Essendon match played in Red Cliffs near Mildura was in honour of the victims of the Cardross road crash that occurred a month prior.

== See also ==
- 2006 AFL season
