= Steven King (footballer) =

Australian rules footballer, born 1978

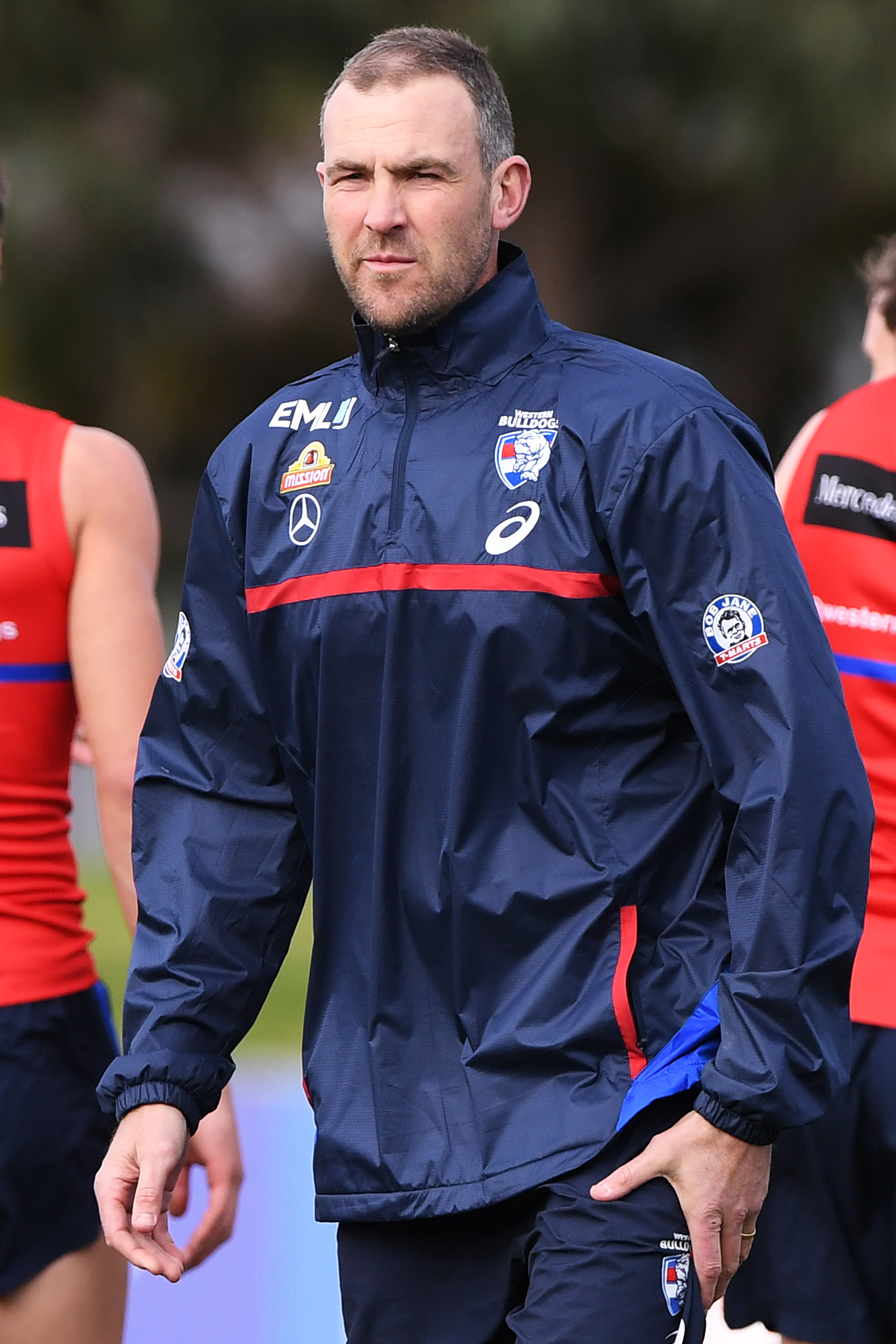
- King in August 2018

Personal information
- Full name: Steven King
- Born: 22 November 1978 (age 47); Shepparton, Victoria
- Original team: Murray Bushrangers (TAC Cup)
- Debut: Round 5, 27 April 1996, Geelong vs. Richmond, at Skilled Stadium
- Height: 201 cm (6 ft 7 in)
- Weight: 105 kg (231 lb)
- Position: Ruckman

Playing career
Years	Club	Games (Goals)
1996–2007	Geelong	193 (75)
2008–2010	St Kilda	47 (8)
Total		240 (83)

Coaching career^{3}
Years	Club	Games (W–L–D)
2023	Gold Coast	7 (2–5–0)
2026–	Melbourne	24 (15–9–0)
Total		31 (17–14–0)
- ^{3} Coaching statistics correct as of round 24, 2026.

Career highlights
- AFL: AFL premiership player: 2007; All-Australian team: 2000; AFL Rising Star nominee: 1996; NAB Cup winning side : 2008; Carji Greeves Medal: 2000, 2002; Geelong captain: 2003–2006; VFL: VFL premiership player: 2007

Steven King (born 22 November 1978) is a former Australian rules footballer who is the current senior coach of the Melbourne Football Club. King played for the Geelong Football Club and St Kilda Football Club in the Australian Football League (AFL), and also had a stint as caretaker coach of the Gold Coast Suns for the last seven matches of the 2023 AFL season.

== Playing career ==
=== Geelong Cats (1996–2007) ===
Debuting as a 17-year-old with Geelong in 1996, King was a gifted ruckman. He won All-Australian selection and won the Carji Greeves Medal in 2000 and again in 2002. He was captain of the club between 2003 and 2006. In 2005, King was hit by numerous injuries, which affected his form.

A moment of controversy occurred in King's career in the 2005 Elimination Final, when he accidentally kicked Melbourne's Jeff White in the head. Both men were contesting a boundary throw in, and it was knocked to the ground. King was the man in front, and when the ball bounced up to head height, he took a mighty swing at it with his right foot. He missed the ball completely, but connected with White's face, giving him injuries which have been described as "equivalent to those of a car accident victim," requiring White to have several plates and screws inserted.

Media commentators and fans were largely divided about whether King should have faced the tribunal for kicking, historically the most heavily penalised infringement whether accidental or intentional. Eventually, the Match Review Panel decided that he had no case to answer, and he was free to play in the semi-final against Sydney the following week. Somewhat ironically, a hamstring injury in the third quarter of that game coincided with a Geelong collapse, and eventually defeat.

King fell out of favour in 2007, playing only a handful of AFL games and was dropped to the Victorian Football League (VFL) in favour of Brad Ottens and Mark Blake. In round 18, playing in the AFL when Ottens was rested, he took a mark over goal umpire Michael Hammond – an awkward half-speckie/half-collision which sent the umpire crashing to the ground; for the second time in his career, despite the AFL's generally strict application of the rule prohibiting contact with field umpires, King avoided tribunal action, with the Match Review Panel deeming that the goal umpire had contributed to the clash, due to the fact that he moved towards the ball as it began to fall.

King continued to perform strongly in the VFL, and played in the Cats' 2007 VFL premiership against Coburg on 23 September. Following weak finals performances by Mark Blake, King received a recall to the senior team for the AFL Grand Final, despite Blake having played more games during the season. King then participated in the Cats' 2007 AFL premiership win against Port Adelaide on 29 September, giving him his second premiership medallion within seven days.

=== St Kilda Saints (2008–2010) ===
Following Mark Blake re-signing as the number-two ruckman, King was offered a one-year contract on reduced pay, which he declined. Lacking space in their salary cap, Geelong then asked King to retire, but eventually traded him, along with Charlie Gardiner, to St Kilda for a sixth-round selection in the 2007 national draft.

King played in St Kilda's 2008 NAB Cup winning side – St Kilda's third pre-season cup win. He played 22 games in 2008 and carried St Kilda's ruck division with 408 hitouts.

King played in 16 of 22 matches in the 2009 season home and away rounds in which St Kilda qualified in first position for the 2009 finals, winning the club's third minor premiership. St Kilda qualified for the 2009 AFL Grand Final after qualifying and preliminary finals wins. King played in the grand final in which St Kilda were defeated by 12 points by his former club Geelong.

On 16 September 2010, King announced his retirement. He played six games for the year, but was being kept out by emerging ruckman, Ben McEvoy.

== Coaching career ==
=== Assistant coaching ===
Upon retiring from playing, King shifted to coaching at St Kilda for the 2010 and 2011 Seasons.

In 2011, King moved to the Western Bulldogs where he was a part of the coaching panel for the 2016 AFL Premiership win and the 2021 Grand Final side.

At the conclusion of the 2021 season, King accepted a senior assistant coaching role with the Gold Coast Suns under senior coach Stuart Dew. He was appointed caretaker senior coach prior to Round 18, 2023 for the remainder of the 2023 season, after the club sacked Dew mid-season. King then coached the Suns for seven games, with two wins and five losses. The team finished in fifteenth place on the ladder and did not make the finals.

King was not retained as Gold Coast Suns senior coach at the end of the 2023 season and was replaced by Damien Hardwick. King left the Suns at the end of the 2023 season, after accepting an offer to join his former club, Geelong, as an assistant coach under senior coach Chris Scott in 2024.

=== Melbourne Demons ===
In September 2025, King was appointed as the senior coach of the Melbourne Football Club, starting from the 2026 AFL season. King replaced caretaker senior coach Troy Chaplin who replaced senior coach Simon Goodwin after Goodwin was sacked in the middle of the 2025 AFL season. He beat former Collingwood coach Nathan Buckley for the role as head coach. Other candidates included Brendon Lade, James Kelly and Daniel Giansiracusa.

== Playing Statistics ==
Legend
G	Goals	K	Kicks	D	Disposals	T	Tackles
B	Behinds	H	Handballs	M	Marks	H/O	Hit-outs

Season	Team	No.	Games	Totals								Averages (per game)							
Season	Team	No.	Games	G	B	K	H	D	M	T	H/O	G	B	K	H	D	M	T	H/O
1996	Geelong	1	13	3	2	81	55	136	38	13	113	0.2	0.2	6.2	4.2	10.5	2.9	1.0	8.7
1997	Geelong	1	22	8	5	202	91	293	94	24	200	0.4	0.2	9.2	4.1	13.3	4.3	1.1	9.1
1998	Geelong	1	11	1	2	89	47	136	60	9	130	0.1	0.2	8.1	4.3	12.4	5.5	0.8	11.8
1999	Geelong	1	17	14	12	134	60	194	63	29	193	0.8	0.7	7.9	3.5	11.4	3.7	1.7	11.4
2000	Geelong	1	23	12	10	252	120	372	82	43	493	0.5	0.4	11.0	5.2	16.2	3.6	1.9	21.4
2001	Geelong	1	16	11	3	161	81	242	76	40	328	0.7	0.2	10.1	5.1	15.1	4.8	2.5	20.5
2002	Geelong	1	22	14	9	237	135	372	100	52	531	0.6	0.4	10.8	6.1	16.9	4.5	2.4	24.1
2003	Geelong	1	13	2	4	95	80	175	49	29	341	0.2	0.3	7.3	6.2	13.5	3.8	2.2	26.2
2004	Geelong	1	16	6	4	126	67	193	55	40	369	0.4	0.3	7.9	4.2	12.1	3.4	2.5	23.1
2005	Geelong	1	18	3	0	140	85	225	69	30	271	0.2	0.0	7.8	4.7	12.5	3.8	1.7	15.1
2006	Geelong	1	16	1	1	116	97	213	67	23	214	0.1	0.1	7.3	6.1	13.3	4.2	1.4	13.4
2007	Geelong	1	6	0	1	18	40	58	18	22	81	0.0	0.2	3.0	6.7	9.7	3.0	3.7	13.5
2008	St Kilda	2	22	5	4	131	110	241	70	60	408	0.2	0.2	6.0	5.0	11.0	3.2	2.7	18.5
2009	St Kilda	2	19	3	1	81	85	166	43	43	286	0.2	0.1	4.3	4.5	8.7	2.3	2.3	15.1
2010	St Kilda	2	6	0	0	22	26	48	14	11	82	0.0	0.0	3.7	4.3	8.0	2.3	1.8	13.7
Career			240	83	58	1885	1179	3064	898	468	4040	0.3	0.2	7.9	4.9	12.8	3.7	2.0	16.8

== Head Coaching Record ==
Team	Year	Home and Away Season					Finals			
Team	Year	Won	Lost	Drew	Win %	Finished	Won	Lost	Win %	Result
MEL	2026	15	8	0	.652	7th out of 18	0	1	.000	Lost to Carlton in Wild Card
		15	8	0	.652		0	1	.000	

== Personal life ==
Steven King co-owned a Geelong-based restaurant with fellow Geelong footballers Matthew Scarlett and Kent Kingsley called the George and Dragon Hotel from 2004–2007 until it changed name and ownership due to financial difficulty.
