= Michael Pettigrew =

Australian rules footballer

Personal information
- Full name: Michael John Pettigrew
- Born: 16 March 1985 (age 41)
- Original team: Whitford JFC
- Draft: Pick 46, 2003 National Draft, Port Adelaide
- Height: 193 cm (6 ft 4 in)
- Weight: 92 kg (203 lb)
- Position: Defender

Playing career^{1}
Years	Club	Games (Goals)
2004–2011	Port Adelaide	103 (25)
- ^{1} Playing statistics correct to the end of 2011.

Michael John Pettigrew (born 16 March 1985) played Australian rules football for the Port Adelaide Football Club in the Australian Football League (AFL). Michael, who had played his junior football for the Whitford Wildcats in West Perth Football Club's District in Western Australia, was picked in the 2003 National Draft at number 46. Pettigrew played his first game for Port Adelaide just after his nineteenth birthday in 2004. He played his 100th AFL game in Round 13 of the 2011 season, against West Coast and finished his AFL career in that 2011 season, having played 103 games over eight years.

On returning to Western Australia, Pettigrew played in the 2012 and 2013 West Australian Football League seasons with West Perth Football Club.
