= Henry Playfair =

Australian rules footballer (born 1983)

Personal information
- Born: 22 January 1983 (age 43); Holbrook, New South Wales
- Original teams: Holbrook, North Shore (Sydney AFL)
- Debut: Round 15, 2003, Geelong vs. Richmond, at Telstra Dome
- Height: 198 cm (6 ft 6 in)
- Weight: 100 kg (220 lb)

Playing career^{1}
Years	Club	Games (Goals)
2003–2007	Geelong	52 (29)
2008–2010	Sydney Swans	16 (14)
Total		68 (43)
- ^{1} Playing statistics correct to the end of 2010.

Career highlights
- VFL 2007 Premiership; VFL 2002 Premiership; NAB Cup 2006 Premiership; TAC Cup NSW/ACT Rams captain 2001; NSW/ACT U18 2001

Henry Playfair (born 22 January 1983) is a former Australian rules footballer who played for the Geelong Football Club and Sydney Swans in the Australian Football League (AFL). Playfair grew up in and played his junior football with Holbrook in the Riverina region of New South Wales.

== Career ==
Drafted by the Geelong Cats in the 2001 AFL draft at pick number 41, he debuted in Round 15 of the 2003 season at Telstra Dome. He was one of Geelong's main players in the 2005 AFL season, however a series of injuries hampered his performance in 2006. He was a key forward who also played the positions of back and ruck.

Playfair was an integral part of the Cats 2007 VFL premiership team, along with players such as Charlie Gardiner, Brent Prismall and Tom Lonergan.

Due to a lack of opportunities, and moving into the prime of his career, Playfair asked to be traded to the Sydney Swans in 2008 and was traded in exchange for a third round draft pick. He moved back to his home state in an attempt to get more AFL playing opportunities.

Sydney delisted Playfair on 13 November 2009 and then redrafted him as a mature age rookie with their first pick (pick 10) in the Rookie Draft on 15 December 2009.

Playfair retired as a player at the end of the 2010 season due to injury concerns, but continued his involvement with football and with the Sydney club, being appointed as a development coach. He coached the reserves team to the NEAFL grand final in 2011. In 2012 he became an assistant coach at the club. He was responsible for the forward line in that year, in which the Swans won the AFL premiership, and has continued in that role.

== Retirement ==
After suffering a serious back injury in the Round 14 match against Richmond at the SCG, and after medical advice, Playfair decided to call an end to his career as an AFL player.

Playfair said "When I found out I’d done some damage to my back it was a bit of a shock. At first I didn’t know what it meant for my season, and then I spoke further to the doctor and the physio and it looked like my season was over, I then had to make a decision about next year, and coming off the troubles I’ve had previously with hamstring injuries over the past couple of seasons, the back was another indication that my body is not up to it at this stage.'’

== Coaching career ==
He started his coaching career in charge of the Swans' NEAFL side in 2011. Playfair was promoted to assistant coach of Sydney Swans in the AFL in 2012 and was in charge of the forwards in Sydney's premiership year. Playfair left the Sydney Swans Football Club at the end of the 2017 season. Playfair then spent two seasons with St Kilda Football Club as backline and team defence assistant coach. In September 2019, Playfair was appointed Head of Coaching Performance at Carlton Football Club with the aim of working directly with the senior coach. On 13 August 2020, Playfair left the Carlton Football Club because his role as head of coaching performance at Carlton was made redundant due to the financial effects of COVID-19.

== Personal life ==
Playfair previously had a fitness business, Fitness By Cats, with former teammates Corey Enright and Brent Prismall. All three are accredited personal trainers.
