= James Kelly (Australian footballer) =

Australian rules footballer, born 1983

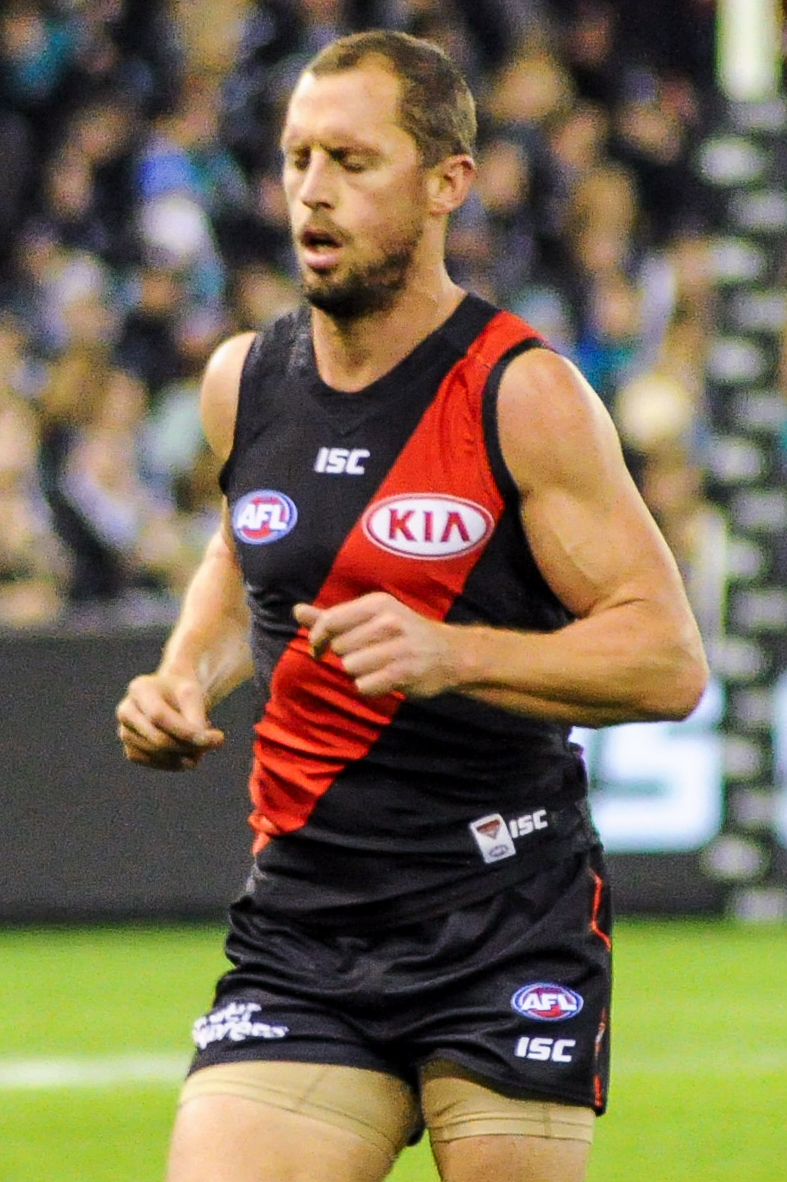
- Kelly playing in June 2017.

Personal information
- Full name: James Kelly
- Nicknames: Kell, Pops, The Custodian
- Born: 29 December 1983 (age 42); Melbourne, Victoria, Australia
- Original teams: Calder Cannons (TAC Cup); Rupertswood (RDFL)
- Draft: No. 17, 2001 national draft
- Height: 183 cm (6 ft 0 in)
- Weight: 85 kg (187 lb)
- Position: Half Back / Midfielder

Playing career^{1}
Years	Club	Games (Goals)
2002–2015	Geelong	273 (88)
2016–2017	Essendon	40 (2)
Total		313 (90)

Representative team honours^{2}
Years	Team	Games (Goals)
2008	Victoria	1 (0)

International team honours^{2}
2011	Australia	2 (0)
- ^{1} Playing statistics correct to the end of 2017.^{2} Representative statistics correct as of 2008.

Career highlights
- 3× AFL Premiership player: 2007, 2009, 2011; 2× AFL Pre-Season Premiership player: 2006, 2009; All-Australian team: 2011; AFL Rising Star nominee: 2002

James Kelly (born 29 December 1983) is a former professional Australian rules footballer who played for the Geelong Football Club and Essendon Football Club in the Australian Football League (AFL).

== Playing career ==
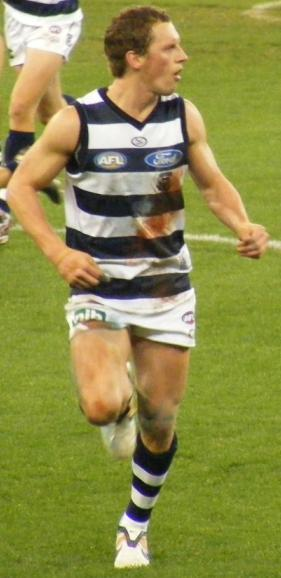
Kelly playing in 2008.

Kelly played for the Geelong Football Club from 2001 to 2015. Playing as a midfielder, he was noted for his possession count, running ability, and durable play style. He served as a team leader during Geelong's successful period, becoming one of twelve players to participate in three premiership wins between 2007-2011.

He was a member of Geelong's 2006 NAB Cup Premiership team, as well as the drought-breaking 2007 AFL Premiership Team. He was also a member of Geelong's losing side in the 2008 Grand Final and their victorious sides in the 2009 and 2011 Grand Finals. He was delisted at the end of the 2015 AFL season, despite averaging 20.5 disposals in 17 games, he subsequently retired from the AFL before signing with the Essendon Football Club in January 2016 as a top-up player in the wake of the club's supplements scandal. Under the player top-up rules, he was delisted at the conclusion of the 2016 season, however, in November he re-signed with Essendon during the delisted free agency period. On 16 August 2017, Kelly retired from playing AFL after 313 games with Geelong and Essendon.

== Coaching career ==
Kelly joined the Essendon coaching staff for the 2018 season and remained there for three years, retiring in February, 2021.

Kelly re-joined Geelong as an assistant coach for the 2022 season

== Statistics ==
Legend
G	Goals	K	Kicks	D	Disposals	T	Tackles
B	Behinds	H	Handballs	M	Marks

Season	Team	No.	Games	Totals							Averages (per game)						
Season	Team	No.	Games	G	B	K	H	D	M	T	G	B	K	H	D	M	T
2002	Geelong	9	15	7	5	137	85	222	41	49	0.5	0.3	9.1	5.7	14.8	2.7	3.3
2003	Geelong	9	18	6	8	129	109	238	43	55	0.3	0.4	7.2	6.1	13.2	2.4	3.1
2004	Geelong	9	13	9	4	151	84	235	48	41	0.7	0.3	11.6	6.5	18.1	3.7	3.2
2005	Geelong	9	24	13	7	254	178	432	95	83	0.5	0.3	10.6	7.4	18.0	4.0	3.5
2006	Geelong	9	15	7	2	134	119	253	48	40	0.5	0.1	8.9	7.9	16.9	3.2	2.7
2007	Geelong	9	23	11	10	201	246	447	85	84	0.5	0.4	8.7	10.7	19.4	3.7	3.7
2008	Geelong	9	21	8	7	196	232	428	95	112	0.4	0.3	9.3	11.0	20.4	4.5	5.3
2009	Geelong	9	18	2	2	195	212	407	88	55	0.1	0.1	10.8	11.8	22.6	4.9	3.1
2010	Geelong	9	23	7	1	257	301	558	87	140	0.3	0.0	11.2	13.1	24.3	3.8	6.1
2011	Geelong	9	24	5	12	319	258	577	62	186	0.2	0.5	13.3	10.8	24.0	2.6	7.8
2012	Geelong	9	19	2	5	257	213	470	59	128	0.1	0.3	13.5	11.2	24.7	3.1	6.7
2013	Geelong	9	20	10	12	234	202	436	50	153	0.5	0.6	11.7	10.1	21.8	2.5	7.7
2014	Geelong	9	23	0	4	312	176	488	113	89	0.0	0.2	13.6	7.6	21.2	4.9	3.9
2015	Geelong	9	17	1	7	185	163	348	80	71	0.1	0.4	10.9	9.6	20.5	4.7	4.2
2016	Essendon	47	20	2	3	268	238	506	129	86	0.1	0.2	13.4	11.9	25.3	6.5	4.3
2017	Essendon	47	20	0	0	209	196	405	115	74	0.0	0.0	10.5	9.8	20.3	5.8	3.7
Career			313	90	89	3438	3012	6450	1238	1446	0.3	0.3	11.0	9.6	20.6	4.0	4.6

== Personal life ==
In 2008, Kelly was an ambassador for an anti-alcohol-fuelled violence campaign run by the Geelong Advertiser titled "Just Think". In this role, Kelly appeared in advertising alongside fellow ambassadors, and Geelong teammates, Tom Harley and David Wojcinski.

== Honours ==
AFL

- 3× AFL Premiership: 2007, 2009, 2011
- 2× AFL Pre-Season Premiership: 2006, 2009
- All-Australian team: 2011
- Jim Stynes Medal: 2011
- AFL Rising Star nominee: 2001

Geelong

- Geelong FC Best First Year Player Award: 2002
- VFL Premiership Player: 2002

TAC Cup

- TAC Cup Premiership: 2001
- TAC Cup Team of the Year: 2001
