= Charlie Gardiner (Australian footballer) =

Australian rules footballer

Personal information
- Born: 1 March 1983 (age 43)
- Original teams: Geelong Grammar School / Sandringham U18
- Debut: Round 11, 2002, Geelong vs. Carlton, at Docklands Stadium
- Height: 190 cm (6 ft 3 in)
- Weight: 91 kg (201 lb)

Playing career^{1}
Years	Club	Games (Goals)
2002–2007	Geelong	51 (25)
2008	St Kilda	12 (9)
Total		63 (34)
- ^{1} Playing statistics correct to the end of 2008.

Career highlights
- Geelong AFL NAB Cup Winning side 2006; St Kilda AFL NAB Cup Winning side 2008

Charles Gardiner (born 1 March 1983) is a former Australian rules footballer for Geelong and St Kilda in the Australian Football League.

== Career ==
Gardiner was recruited from the Sandringham Zebras and was pick no. 23 by Geelong in the 2001 National Draft.

Gardiner was in the TAC Cup Team of the Year and Under-18 All-Australian Team in 2001. Gardiner was also runners up in Sandringham's best & fairest and Under-18 Victoria Metro representative in 2001. In 2002 Gardiner debuted for Geelong's senior side later the same year.

Gardiner was traded to St Kilda Football Club during the 2007 trade week, along with fellow Cats player Steven King for St Kilda's draft selection 90. He had an indifferent year, playing 12 games, including the qualifying final against old club Geelong, and kicking 9 goals but in the end it was not enough to retain his spot on the Saints' list and he was delisted at the end of the season. He has since returned to amateur football in the VAFA.

In 2019 Gardiner joined the Sydney Swans as Executive General Manager of Football.

In December 2024, Charlie Gardiner was named Collingwood’s Executive General Manager, ahead of the 2025 season.

== Statistics ==
Statistics are correct to end of 2008 season

Season	Team	No.	Games	Goals	Behinds	Kicks	Marks	Handballs	Disposals
2002	Geelong	16	3	1	1	7	2	7	14
2003	Geelong	16	8	4	3	28	20	15	43
2004	Geelong	16	19	10	11	122	78	62	184
2005	Geelong	16	14	5	6	91	74	66	157
2006	Geelong	16	5	4	2	45	25	30	75
2007	Geelong	16	2	1	1	16	15	15	31
2008	St.Kilda	28	12	9	3	87	62	53	140
Totals			63	34	27	395	276	248	643
